= Vallenato Legend Festival 1969 =

Colombian music festival (2nd edition)

- Genre: Vallenato music festival
- Dates: 26–28 April 1969
- Locations: Plaza Alfonso López, Valledupar, Colombia
- Previous event: Vallenato Legend Festival 1968
- Next event: Vallenato Legend Festival 1970
- Attendance: 8000
- Organiser: Cesar Departmental Institute of Culture

The Vallenato Legend Festival 1969 (Spanish: Festival de la Leyenda Vallenata 1969) was the second edition of the Vallenato Legend Festival, and was held from 26 to 28 April 1969 at the Plaza Alfonso López in Valledupar, Colombia. The main event of the festival was the professional accordionist competition, which was won by Colacho Mendoza, whose win sparked a small riot. The festival also held an amateur accordionist competition, won by Emiliano Zuleta Díaz, and an unpublished song competition, won by Gustavo Gutiérrez Cabello with "Rumores de Viejas Voces".

== Accordionist competitions ==
In 1969, unlike the previous year, two competitions were held for accordion conjuntos, one for professionals (Spanish: acordeoneros profesionales) and the other for amateurs (Spanish: acordeoneros aficionados). Sonia Osorio of El Tiempo reported that the professionals "should have a recognised musical career, have recorded albums, and regularly play their instrument", while the amateur competition was open to "young people who have not participated in previous music competitions and who, as a hobby, cultivate the music of the department [Cesar]."

=== Professional ===
The professional accordionist competition began with every competing conjunto performing to one of eight juries, each made up of three judges. They had to perform each of the four "airs" of vallenato: merengue and son on 26 April, and paseo and puya on 27 April. The finalists were announced on 28 April, and the final was held that day.

The final was judged by a jury comprising Jaime Gutiérrez de Piñeres, Carlos Caballero Cormane, Carlos Escobar Sierra, Hugues Martínez, and Alejo Durán. Colacho Mendoza won the competition, accompanied by Adán Montero on guacharaca and Rodolfo Castilla on caja. In the final they performed the paseo "La Guacamaya Verde" (written by Luís Castrillón), the merengue "La Pule" (Emiliano Zuleta), the puya "Elvirita Armenta" (Simón Salas), and the son "Cuando el Tigre Está en la Cueva" (Juan Muñoz). Following the announcement of the results, members of the crowd threw stones and bottles at the stage, one of which struck Gonzalo Arango, who was sat in the front row. Police restrained the crowd and escorted Mendoza away.

Finalists and results
Rank	Accordionist	Department	Prize winnings (COP$)
1st	Colacho Mendoza	Cesar	11,000
2nd	Andrés Landero	Bolívar	9,000
3rd	Julio de la Ossa	Sucre	7,000
	Lisandro Meza	Sucre	
	Alberto Pacheco	Atlántico	
	Abel Antonio Villa	Magdalena	

Other accordionists who competed but did not reach the final include Enrique Díaz, Náfer Durán, José María Peñaranda, and Emilio Oviedo. Allegedly Luis Enrique Martínez, who came third in 1968, had planned to compete, but was disqualified for being drunk.

=== Amateur ===
Emiliano Zuleta Díaz won the amateur accordionist competition. Other competitors included Florentino Montero, Julio García, Miguel López, Pedro Castro, Miguel Ahumada, and Héctor Bolaño.

== Other competitions and performances ==
The festival held an unpublished song competition (Spanish: canción inédita), which was won by Gustavo Gutiérrez Cabello with "Rumores de Viejas Voces". Venezuelan band Billo's Caracas Boys were booked to perform at the festival, but were denied entry by the Colombian government. Rita Fernández Padilla performed with her band Las Universitarias from Santa Marta.
