= Vallenato Legend Festival 1968 =

Colombian music festival (1st edition)

- Genre: Vallenato music festival
- Dates: 27–30 April 1968
- Locations: Plaza Alfonso López, Valledupar, Colombia
- Coordinates: 10°28′39″N 73°14′40″W
- Next event: Vallenato Legend Festival 1969
- Organiser: Cesar Departmental Institute of Culture

The Vallenato Legend Festival 1968 (Spanish: Festival de la Leyenda Vallenata 1968) was the first edition of the Vallenato Legend Festival, and was held from 27 to 30 April 1968 at the Plaza Alfonso López in Valledupar, Colombia. The main event of the festival was the accordionist competition, which was won by Alejo Durán.

A 2013 report by the Colombian Ministry of Culture wrote that "an important factor in the dissemination and consolidation of vallenato music as a cultural emblem of Colombia was the creation, in 1968, of the Vallenato Legend Festival" and that "the promotional success of the Vallenato Legend Festival led to the creation of more than fifty festivals celebrating vallenato culture nationwide."

== History ==
=== Background ===
The genre of vallenato first appeared in the communities of the Colombian Caribbean in the first half of the 20th century. The origins of the genre are disputed, but one common version alleges that early vallenato performers travelled from town to town, spreading news in the form of song, and often accompanied by the music of a diatonic button accordion, which had been brought to the region from Germany in the 1880s.

Several vallenato music competitions took place prior to the creation of the Vallenato Legend Festival. The first known was the Fiesta de los Vallenatos, held in Barranquilla in November 1948; another took place in Pivijay in 1960, and was won by Alejo Durán. The Casa Chams, a recording studio in Fundación, hosted several vallenato competitions in the 1950s, whose winners included Pacho Rada and Luis Enrique Martínez.

=== Creation of the Vallenato Legend Festival ===
In March 1966 a vallenato festival was organised by Gabriel García Márquez and Rafael Escalona in Aracataca; it was won by accordionist Colacho Mendoza, and other attendees included Julio de la Ossa, César Castro, and Andrés Landero. Márquez reportedly claimed that the festival would be held the following year in Valledupar.

In December 1967, the Colombian department of Cesar was created out of 12 municipalities taken from the existing department of Magdalena. Several new departments were being considered for creation in Colombia at the time, and politician Alfonso López Michelsen had promoted the cause of Cesar by travelling the country accompanied by accordionists including Colacho Mendoza and holding vallenato parties. López Michelsen became governor of the department on its creation, and Rafael Escalona was made public relations chief.

The Vallenato Legend Festival 1968 was organised by López Michelsen, Escalona, Consuelo Araújo Noguera, and Miriam Pupo as a way of consolidating the musical culture of Cesar, and of promoting the department as a tourist destination.

== Accordionist competition ==
The main event of the festival was the accordionist competition, with a prize of 5000 Colombian pesos.

=== Results ===
Thirty groups entered the competition, and on 27 April they performed to three panels of judges, comprising:

1. Rafael Escalona, Hugues Martínez, and Evaristo Gutiérrez,
2. Gustavo Gutiérrez Cabello, Jaime Gutiérrez de Piñeres, and Carlos Vidal,
3. Alfonso "Poncho" Cotes, Tobías Enrique Pumarejo, and Rodrigo Montero.

Six finalists were selected from the entrants. The final took place on 30 April, and was judged by Rafael Escalona, Gustavo Gutiérrez, and Tobías Enrique Pumarejo, whose compositions were not permitted to be performed. Alejo Durán won the competition and was awarded the title of vallenato king (Spanish: rey vallenato). He was accompanied by Juan Manuel Tapias on guacharaca and Pastor "El Niño" Arrieta on caja, and performed the songs "Alicia Adorada", "Corralito", "Envejeces Corazón", and "Pedazo de Acordeón", the only competition entry that was in the style of puya.

Finalists and results
Rank	Accordionist	Department	Conjunto
1st	Alejo Durán	Cesar	
2nd	Ovidio Granados	Cesar	Los Playoneros
3rd	Luis Enrique Martínez	La Guajira	
	Fabri Meriño	La Guajira	Fabry y sus Muchachos
	Toño Salas	La Guajira	
	Emiliano Zuleta Baquero	La Guajira	

=== Legacy ===
Alejo Durán is considered one of the greatest performers of vallenato, in part due to his winning the accordionist competition of the first Vallenato Legend Festival. Luis Enrique Martínez was the only other finalist to later win the competition and be crowned vallenato king, in 1973. Ovidio Granados competed again in 1975 and 1983, coming second both times. Following her performance at the festival, Fabri Meriño was approached by Alfredo Gutiérrez to join his band. She competed once more in 1969 before her death aged 19 in 1971.

== Other performances and activities ==
Rita Fernández performed at the festival with Las Universitarias, her all-female vallenato conjunto from Santa Marta.

Other events at the festival included a crafts exhibition, cockfighting, a historical reenactment of the first arrival of the Spanish army to the Upar Valley, and a large number of private parties and piquerias.
