= Julio Rojas Buendía =

Colombian accordionist

- Born: Julio César Rojas Buendía; 28 June 1958; San Juan Nepomuceno, Colombia
- Died: 20 June 2016 (aged 57) Barranquilla, Colombia
- Genres: Vallenato

Julio César Rojas Buendía (Note: In this Spanish name, the first or paternal surname is Rojas and the second or maternal family name is Buendía.) (28 June 1958 – 20 June 2016) was a Colombian accordionist. He was crowned Vallenato King for winning the accordionist competition of the Vallenato Legend Festival in 1983 and 1994, and is the only person other than Alfredo Gutiérrez to have done so more than once.

== Biography ==
=== Early life ===
Julio César Rojas Buendía was born on 28 June 1958 in San Juan Nepomuceno, in the Colombian department of Bolívar. He started playing accordion at the age of 13.

=== Music career ===
In 1978 Rojas won the amateur accordionist competition of the Vallenato Legend Festival, and in 1980 he won the semiprofessional competition. He was twice crowned Vallenato King for winning the professional accordionist competition of the Festival, first in 1983 and again in 1994. In 1983 his opponents included Ovidio Granados, Andrés Landero, and past winner Náfer Durán. On the jury in 1983 was Gabriel García Márquez, who had won the Nobel Prize in Literature the previous year, and who joked to Rojas about possible favouritism due to his sharing a surname with the Buendía family of One Hundred Years of Solitude. Following his win, Buendía performed regularly for Márquez, and reported his favourite vallenato songs to be "Elegía a Jaime Molina" by Rafael Escalona and "Mercedes" by Adolfo Pacheco.

Rojas competed again in the accordionist competition of the Vallenato Legend Festival in 1993, but was disqualified for using a caja with a synthetic head made from X-ray film. He competed and won in 1994, making him the only person other than Alfredo Gutiérrez to have won the standard competition more than once.

Rojas competed and won competitions in several other music festivals across Colombia, including the Festival Cuna de Acordeones in Villanueva, the Festival Nacional de Acordeoneros in his hometown San Juan Nepomuceno, and twice the Rey Sabanero del Acordeón in Sincelejo. He accompanied many singers and musicians on more than 20 records, including Armando Moscote, Ricardo Maestre, Poncho Zuleta, Joaco Pertuz, Octavio Daza, Luis Vence, Lizardo Bustillo, and Enaldo Barrera.

=== Personal life and death ===
Rojas was in a vallenato conjunto with his four sons, Julio Alfonso, Julio Alejandro, Julio Mario, and Julio César. He died on 20 June 2016 in Barranquilla.
