= Orangel Maestre =

Colombian accordionist (born 1961)

- Also known as: El Pangue
- Born: 19 September 1961 (age 65); Villanueva, Colombia
- Genre: Vallenato

Orangel Maestre Socarrás (Note: In this Spanish name, the first or paternal surname is Maestre and the second or maternal family name is Socarrás.) (born 19 September 1961), also known as El Pangue, is a Colombian vallenato accordionist. He was crowned vallenato king in 1984 for winning the professional accordionist competition of the Vallenato Legend Festival. He has recorded albums with singers including Silvio Brito and Iván Villazón.

== Biography ==
Maestre was born on 19 September 1961 in Villanueva, in the Colombian department of La Guajira. His parents were Tomás Camilo Maestre Murgas and Gloria Socarrás.

Maestre performed at the Vallenato Legend Festival for the first time in 1973, aged 12, in the child accordionist category. He came second in 1973 and 1974, and won the competition in 1975. In 1984, Maestre was crowned vallenato king for winning the professional accordionist competition of the festival. In the final he performed the paseo "El Mejoral" (written by Rafael Escalona), the merengue "El Hombre de Malas", the son "El Alto del Rosario", and the puya "La Vieja Gabriela" (written by Juan Muñoz). Also in the final were Egidio Cuadrado (who came second), Miguel Ahumada (third), and Alberto Rada. In 1988, Maestre won the accordionist competition of the Festival Cuna de Acordeones. He appeared in the 1986 film La Boda del Acordeonista.

Maestre has recorded several albums with singer Silvio Brito. He has also recorded with Rafael "El Cachaco" Jiménez, Juan Piña, Iván Villazón, and Beto Zabaleta. Maestre plays in the style of "acordeón picado", created by Israel Romero, which was popular in vallenato between 1975 and 1994.
