= Alberto Pacheco =

Colombian musician and songwriter (1935–1983)

- Born: Alberto Pacheco Balmaceda; 23 June 1935; Barranquilla, Colombia
- Died: 29 September 1983 (aged 48) Valledupar, Colombia
- Genre: vallenato
- Labels: Sonolux, Orbe
- Spouse: Amira Callejas
- Children: 5

Alberto Pacheco Balmaceda (Note: In this Spanish name, the first or paternal surname is Pacheco and the second or maternal family name is Balmaceda.) (1935–1983) was a Colombian musician and songwriter. He won the accordionist competition of the Vallenato Legend Festival in 1971.

== Biography ==
Alberto Pacheco was born on 23 June 1935 in Barranquilla.

As a young man Pacheco would visit the Chop Suey restaurant in Barranquilla to see musicians such as Rafael Mejía Romani and his Trío Serenata perform. In the early 1950s he started to gain prominence as an accordionist with his group Los Campesinos del Magdalena, whose other members were Juan Madrid and Esteban Montano on guitar, Carlos "Comecuero" Perdomo on the caja drum, and Carlos Vélez on guacharaca.

In 1960 Pacheco travelled to Mexico with Julio Bovea. On returning he joined the Bogotano group Los Universitarios led by Pedro García Díaz; they performed in Czechoslovakia and the Soviet Union. He later toured with the folkloric groups of Sonia Osorio and Delia Zapata Olivella. Pacheco also led the group Los Cumbancheros de Pacheco, who made a successful recording of his cumbia composition "Cumbia de Santo domingo".

=== The Vallenato Legend Festival ===
Pacheco did not take part in the accordionist competition of the first Vallenato Legend Festival in 1968 because of previous commitments in Maracaibo, Venezuela. He did not join the second competition in 1969 because of his friendship with Colacho Mendoza, who had already announced his participation (and went on to win).

At the fourth Vallenato Legend Festival in 1971, Pacheco won the accordionist competition, beating Luis Enrique Martínez and Emiliano Zuleta Díaz, who came second and third place respectively. His competition performances were "La Cacería" (a puya written by Sergio Moya Molina), "El Pobre Juan" (a paseo written by Rafael Escalona), and "Francisco El Hombre" (a merengue that he wrote himself).

Because Pacheco was from Barranquilla, he was seen as an intruder by some at the festival. Luis Francisco Mendoza wrote the song "Festival Vallenato" criticising Pacheco's win; ironically, a performance of the song by Nelson Henríquez was successful in Barranquilla, winning Henríquez a Golden Congo at the Barranquilla Carnival.

=== Personal life and death ===
Pacheco was married to Amira Callejas, with whom he had 5 children. He lived in Valledupar, and died there of a heart attack on 29 September 1983.

== Musical style and compositions ==
Pacheco's style on the accordion was influenced by his skill on the guitar. In 1966 he composed the paseo "Departamento del Cesar", the "flagship song" for the campaign for the creation of the Department of Cesar, which succeeded in 1967. Pacheco also wrote "Viejo Valledupar", which according to El Tiempo is considered a "folkloric hymn" in Valledupar.
