= Octavio Daza =

Colombian songwriter and civil engineer (1948–1980)

- Born: Octavio de Jesús Daza Daza; 15 April 1948; San Juan del Cesar, Colombia
- Died: 12 January 1980 (aged 31) Barranquilla, Colombia
- Genre: Vallenato
- Years active: 1970s–1980

Octavio de Jesús Daza Daza (Note: In this Spanish name, the first or paternal surname is Daza and the second or maternal family name is Daza.) (1948–1980) was a Colombian vallenato songwriter and civil engineer. He is remembered for his poetic lyricism, and his compositions have been recorded by artists including Diomedes Díaz, Claudia de Colombia, and El Gran Combo de Puerto Rico. Daza won the unpublished song competition of the Vallenato Legend Festival in 1978 with "Río Badillo".

== Early life and education ==
Octavio de Jesús Daza Daza was born on 15 April 1948 in San Juan del Cesar, in the Colombian department of La Guajira, to Samuel Francisco "Chame" Daza Hinojosa and Palmina de Jesús Daza Maestre. He grew up in Patillal, where played in a musical duo with his cousin Freddy Molina. After completing his baccalaureate at the Colegio Cristo Rey in Bucaramanga, Daza completed a degree in civil engineering at the Universidad Santo Tomás.

== Musical style and compositions ==
Daza began writing songs at the age of 16. His method was first to write the lyrics as a poem, and afterwards compose the music. He was a keen reader of authors including Pablo Neruda and Gustavo Adolfo Bécquer, and is remembered for his poetic lyricism. The first song of Daza's to be recorded was "El baile de los animales", by Dolcey Gutiérrez in 1965. His music career only began in earnest in the 1970s.

In 1977, Diomedes Díaz and Elberto López recorded Daza's composition "Frente a mí". In April 1978, Daza won the unpublished song competition of the Vallenato Legend Festival with the song "Río Badillo", which was subsequently recorded by los Hermanos Zuleta and Claudia de Colombia. Daza won song competitions at various other festivals, accompanied by Armando Moscote on vocals, including the Festival de Acordeones in San Andrés with "Sanandresana" (later recorded by recorded by Diomedes Díaz and Colacho Mendoza), and the Festival de Acordeón Bolivarense in Arjona with "Nido de Amor". "Nido de Amor" was later a hit for El Gran Combo de Puerto Rico, after director Rafael Ithier heard Jorge Oñate performing the song while the Combo were visiting Barranquilla.

Daza's other notable compositions include "Figuras de amor" (also called "Mi novia y mi pueblo"), "Oye tú", "La tierra tiene sed", and "Dime pajarito".

== Personal life and death ==
Daza was abducted and killed by hitmen in Barranquilla on 12 January 1980. His body was taken to a hospital the next day, with two gunshot wounds, where it was identified by Rafael Escalona. El Tiempo reported that the killing was a case of mistaken identity, as Daza had been driving the car of the intended victim, Francis Dangond. His funeral was held in Valledupar on 14 January, and was attended by thousands of people. Several prominent vallenato musicians performed Daza's compositions at the funeral, including Jorge Oñate, Rita Fernández, Cecilia Meza Reales, Diomedes Díaz, Andrés Gil, and Gustavo Gutiérrez.

At the time of his death, Daza was director of the Colombian Institute of School Buildings (Spanish: Instituto Colombiano de Construcciones Escolares, ICCE) in Valledupar. He had a son with María Concepción Gámez Pareja, born 19 days before his death.

Songwriter Tomás Darío Gutiérrez won the unpublished song competition of the Vallenato Legend Festival in 1980 with the paseo "Voz de acordeones", written in tribute to Daza.
