= Pedro García Díaz =

Colombian singer, songwriter, accordionist, and lawyer

- Born: 19 April 1938; Atanquez, Colombia
- Died: April 2007 (aged 68–69) Valledupar, Colombia
- Genres: vallenato

Pedro García Díaz (1938–2007) was a Colombian singer, songwriter, accordionist, and lawyer. He led the vallenato group Los Universitarios, with whom he recorded the "first Bogotano album completely dedicated to vallenato singing".

== Biography ==
=== Early life and education ===
García was born on 19 April 1938 in Atanquez, at that time in Magdalena and now in Cesar. He was of partial Kankuamo descent. He attended school in Valledupar and the Liceo Bolívar in Bogotá.

=== Early career and Los Universitarios ===
At the age of 13 García wrote the merengue "Teresa", which was recorded and made successful by Bovea y sus Vallenatos. On leaving secondary school he started performing as a singer. He appeared on the radio program "Meridiano en la Costa" on Radio Santa Fe in Bogotá.

In 1960 García entered the Free University of Colombia to study law. He graduated in 1970, and worked as police commissioner and later for the district Procuraduría Judicial. While studying, García led and sang for the vallenato group Los Universitarios alongside Victor Soto on accordion, Reynaldo López on guacharaca, Pablo López on caja, and Esteban Salas on backing vocals. Los Universitarios' first LP was released on the record label Discos Orbe in 1962. Their second LP Sabor Tropical was released in 1963, with Calixto Ochoa on accordion. The song "Canto al Tolima" from the album was particularly successful.

When García lost his job as police commissioner in 1967 he wrote the song "La Muerte de un Comisario" (Spanish for "the death of a commissioner") about it, which Los Universitarios performed on the radio accompanied by Alberto Pacheco on accordion and Francisco Zumaqué on bass guitar. The song became the title track of Los Universitarios' third LP, which was released on Discos Orbe in 1967. The success of this record led the band to represent Colombia at the 9th World Festival of Youth and Students in Sofia, Bulgaria, in 1968. Following this the group performed in Czechoslovakia and the Soviet Union. García and Los Universitarios recorded several other albums with Pacheco for Discos Orbe, as well as three albums with Colacho Mendoza on accordion, which included the first accordion arrangement of Emiliano Zuleta's composition "La Gota Fría".

=== Later career and the Vallenato Legend Festival ===
In 1972 Pepe Sánchez invited Los Universitarios to record the main theme for the telenovela Vendaval. It was the last time that the group played together, and after that García and Esteban Salas formed Los Cañaguateros with Florentino Montero on accordion. Los Cañaguateros had hits with "El Trovador Ambulante", "Adiós al Magdalena", "Nostalgia de Amigo", and "Amor de Mis Amores". In the 1970s García recorded eight more LPs for CBS and other record labels.

García was a founding member of the Board of Directors of the Vallenato Legend Festival. In 1979 his song "El Poeta Pintor", an homage to Valledupar painter Jaime Molina Maestre, won the unpublished song competition of the Festival.

=== Death ===
García died in April 2007 during the Vallenato Legend Festival, where he was competing in the unpublished song competition.
