= Julio de la Ossa =

Colombian accordionist and songwriter

- Also known as: Pequeño Gigante del Acordeón
- Born: Julio Enrique de la Ossa Domínguez; 20 July 1936; Chochó, Sucre, Colombia
- Died: 28 September 1998 (aged 62) Montería, Colombia
- Genre: vallenato
- Spouse: Gladys Ochoa
- Children: 12

Julio Enrique de la Ossa Domínguez (1936–1998) was a Colombian accordionist and songwriter. He won the accordionist competition of the Vallenato Legend Festival in 1975.

== Early life ==
Julio de la Ossa was born on 20 July 1936 in Chochó in Sucre Department, Colombia, to Elvira Domínguez Contreras and Julio de la Ossa Álvarez. His mother Elvira died when he was 2 years old, and he was raised by his maternal grandmother.

In the early 1950s De la Ossa began to listen to the music of Abel Antonio Villa and Alejo Durán. He asked his grandmother for an accordion, and she refused. He saved money by selling water in the corralejas of Sampués, and bought a broken two-row button accordion which he sent to Calixto Ochoa in Sincelejo to be fixed.

== Recording career ==
De la Ossa's first composition was the paseo "Carmencita", written for a woman from Chochó. At the age of 20 he met his father in San Jacinto del Cauca, who gave him the money to buy a three-row accordion. De la Ossa bought the accordion from Calixto Ochoa for 350 pesos, and then made his first recordings with Roberto de la Barrera in Cartagena: "Mi Vida Es Para Ti", "El Motetico", and "En Abarcas".

De la Ossa joined Discos Fuentes, and recorded exclusively for them from 1960 to 1962. Years later he recorded again for Fuentes with Los Corraleros de Majagual. From Fuentes he moved to Discos Tropical, where he released the popular "La Margentina", "Adiós María", "Linda Sucreñita" and "Los Miles Trabajos". Around this time he also recorded for record labels Codiscos and Alpha, and later for Sonolux and CBS.

In 1968 De la Ossa moved to Valledupar where he released the successful single "La Colegiala" on Discos Tropical, which was later covered by Binomio de Oro.

== The Vallenato Legend Festival ==
De la Ossa took part in the accordionist competition of the Vallenato Legend Festival several times. In 1969 he came third behind Andrés Landero (second) and Colacho Mendoza (first). De la Ossa had no experience playing puya, which was required at the time, but composed one ("La Ojona") during the competition.

De la Ossa competed again in 1973, coming second behind Luis Enrique Martínez, and came third in 1974 behind Náfer Durán (second) and Alfredo Gutiérrez (first). De la Ossa won the competition and was crowned rey vallenato in 1975.

== Personal life and death ==
De la Ossa was married to Gladys Ochoa, with whom he had 8 children. He had 2 more children in Montería, and 1 more each in Venezuela and Córdoba, for a total of 12. His daughter Ludy de la Ossa released an album of vallenatos on CBS in 1978, including a cover of his composition "Nunca Lo Creí".

De la Ossa died on 28 September 1998 in Montería.

== Musical style and compositions ==
De la Ossa wrote over 180 songs. His notable compositions include "Cariñito", "Las Cartas", "Bella Cascada", "Mi Visita", "Mi Testamento", "Padres Corrompidos", "La Margentina", "El Preso Distinguido", "Puya Saramuya", "Los Miles Trabajos", "Orfelina", "No Soy Malo (Chave)", "Vivo Enguayabado" and "La Segoviana".

De la Ossa's song "La Margentina" has become a standard at the Vallenato Legend Festival.
