= Iván Villazón =

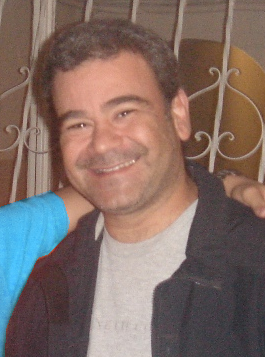

Background information
- Also known as: La Joven Voz Tenor
- Born: Iván Francisco Villazón Aponte; October 25, 1959 (age 66)
- Origin: Valledupar, Cesar, Colombia
- Genres: Vallenato, Latin
- Occupation: singer
- Instrument: Singing
- Years active: 1984–present
- Label: Sony Music

Iván Francisco Villazón Aponte (born October 25, 1959, in the city of Valledupar, Colombia), is one of the most renowned vallenato singers in Colombia. His career as a singer began in 1984 after dropping out of college where he was pursuing a degree in law.

== Early life ==
Villazon spent his childhood in the city Valledupar where he attended middle school in the Colegio María Montessori. He grew up loving "parrandas" (parties) that his father Crispin organized with local musicians like Colacho Mendoza, Adán Montero, Ovidio Granados, Rodolfo Castilla and Alejo Durán, among many others. For high school Villazon was sent to the city of Bogotá to study in the Colegio REFOUS. After graduation he spent four years in college studying law in the Externado University but dropped out to pursue a vallenato singing career.

== Singing career ==
In 1984 Villazón recorded his first album with accordion player Alfredo Gámez under the Philips Records label and named it the Arco Iris (Rainbow) featuring a song of the same name written by Rafael Escalona. The album was a success and the song is still considered his trademark.

In 1985 he teamed up with accordion player Orangel Maestre and released a new album under the same record label with the name Una Voz, Un Rey. Three songs from this album became major hits: "Mella Condolete" by composer Hernando Marín, "Pedazo de Acordeon" by Alejo Duran and "Sufrir de nuevo" by Iván Ovalle.

In 1986 Villazón joined with accordion player Raúl Martínez to record two albums, Los Virtuosos and Vamo' Amanece, under the CBS record label (now Columbia Records). The award-winning song "El amor es un cultivo" recorded in this album became a major hit, along with "Sed de alma" and "Matica de toronjil". In 1987 they recorded their third album named Los Virtuosos Volumen II, producing two major hits: "Recuérdame" written by singer and composer Gustavo Gutiérrez Cabello and "Yo tenia un amigo" written by composer Rafael Manjarrez. Personal differences arose between Villazón and Martínez and they decided to separate.

In 1988 Villazón teamed up with accordion player and Vallenato Legend Festival winner Cocha Molina who had been the partner of Diomedes Díaz. They recorded the album Por ti Valledupar from which they produced three major hits: "No espero mas" by composer Efren Calderon, "Que siga la fiesta" by José Alfonso Maestre and "Por ti Valledupar" by Gustavo Gutierrez, under the CBS record label. In 1989 they recorded their second album together named Enamorado de ella with hit songs "Mis Condiciones" by Gustavo Gutierrez and "Enamorado de ella" by Rafael Manjarrez. In 1990 they recorded their third album under the CBS record label titled El Amor Canta Vallenato with the hit songs "Mi novia querida" by Gustavo Gutierrez, "El Amor Canta Vallenato" by Ignasio Urbina and "Volá pajarito" by Alejo Durán.

This same year Villazón and Molina decided to go their different ways and Villazón teamed up with accordion player Beto Villa to record the album La Compañía under the recording label EMI. This album represents his most successful album because all of the album's songs became major hits on radio, including "El Perdón", "El Niño Bonito", "La Suegra", "El Guayabito" and "La Fuerza del Amor". After this successful production Villazón and Beto Villa split and Villazón took two years off from the stage and recording studios.

In 1993 Villazón worked with accordion player Franco Arguelles and recorded the album Mar de Lagrimas on the Colombian record label Codiscos, with the hit songs "Quereme" by Juancho Rois, "Cuando hablo de Tí" by Iván Ovalle and a musical mosaic honoring Pacho Galán. In 1994, they recorded their second album together named Noticias, producing successful songs like "Decídete" by Fabián Corrales, "Noticias" by Efraín Barliza and "Acabaste con mí Vida" by Juancho Rois. This year the group won the Congo de Oro prize at the Barranquilla Carnival, the Sirena de Oro at the Vallenato Legend Festival and the Super Estrella Internacional de Oro song of the year for the song "Decídete" by Fabian Corrales. The group also achieved prominence internationally in locations where vallenato is not part of the mainstream, like Cuba, Canada and Aruba. In 1996 Villazón and Arguelles recorded the album Sin Limites under the record label Codiscos in which a fusion with other musical genres was tried with songs like "Almas Felices" by Alfonso Cotes Maya, "La Pelionera" by Emiliano Zuleta Díaz and "Cuando muera esta ilusión" by Luis Egurrola. This collaboration was not widely successful. They later changed record labels to BMG Ariola of Colombia, recording the album Entrégate with songs like "No te ruego más" by Jorge Valbuena, "Entrégate" by Fabián Corrales, "Yo la Ví" by Jacobo Ibarra and Marcos Torres, and "Corazón Sensible" by Franco Arguelles. This album earned a Disco de Oro for its sales and a second Congo de Oro. In 1999 Villazón and Arguelles released the albums Tiempo de Vallenato and later Detalles.

In 2000 Arguelles left the group to record an album with Diomedes Diaz. Villazón partnered with Saúl Lallemand producing the following albums: El Mundo al Reves, Amores, Juglares Legendarios I, Póngale la Firma, El Desafío, El Gallo Fino, El Poder del Amor and El Aviador.

== Discography ==
Iván Villazón performing with accordist partner Saul Lallemand.

Albums:

1. El Arco Iris – 1984
2. Una voz un rey – 1985
3. Vamo' amanecé – 1986
4. Los Virtuosos – 1987
5. Por Ti Valledupar – 1988
6. Enamorado de Ella – 1989
7. El Amor Canta Vallenato – 1990
8. La Compañía – 1991
9. Mar de Lágrimas – 1993
10. Noticia – 1994
11. Sin Límites – 1995
12. Entrégate – 1996
13. Tiempo de Vallenato – 1997
14. Detalles – 1998
15. El Mundo al Revés – 1999
16. Amores – 2000
17. Juglares Legendarios Vol 1 – 2001
18. Póngale la Firma – 2002
19. El Desafío – 2002
20. El Gallo Fino – 2003
21. El Poder del Amor – 2004
22. El Sueño de mi vida – 2005
23. El Aviador – 2006
24. 23 Años de Grandes Exitos-Su Trayectoria [2007]
25. Pa' que te enamores [2008] Iván Zuleta
26. El Vallenato Mayor [2009] José María Chema Ramos

== Family ==
Villazon is the son of Crispín Villazón de Armas y Clara Aponte López. He married Aida Mercedes García Tolosa and has three children: Crispin Enrique, Iván David and Daniel Camilo. Lucas Francisco, Carolina and Francisco Villazon are Ivan's brother children.
