= Rafael Salas (musician) =

Colombian accordionist

- Born: Rafael Antonio Salas Mendoza; 17 September 1952; El Plan, La Jagua del Pilar, Colombia
- Died: 19 April 2011 (aged 58) Valledupar, Colombia
- Genres: Vallenato

Rafael Antonio Salas Mendoza (Note: In this Spanish name, the first or paternal surname is Salas and the second or maternal family name is Mendoza.) (1952–2011) was a Colombian vallenato accordionist. He was crowned vallenato king in 1979 for winning the professional accordionist competition of the Vallenato Legend Festival.

== Biography ==
Salas was born on 17 September 1952 in El Plan, a town in the municipality of La Jagua del Pilar in the Colombian department of La Guajira. His father Toño Salas and uncle Emiliano Zuleta were both renowned vallenato accordionists.

Salas played the accordion, the guacharaca, and the caja. He competed in the amateur accordionist competition of the Vallenato Legend Festival in 1971, 1973, 1975, and 1976. In 1979, Salas was crowned vallenato king for winning the professional accordionist competition of the festival; in the final he defeated Alberto Villa and Florentino Montero.

Salas had four children with his wife Ruth Plata. He died on 19 April 2011 in Valledupar. (Note: Some reports claim that Salas died at one minute past midnight on 20 April.)
