= Iván Zuleta Barros =

Colombian accordionist

- Born: 27 October 1976 (age 49); Urumita, Colombia
- Genres: Vallenato
- Years active: 1984–present
- Relatives: Emiliano Zuleta (grandfather); Los Hermanos Zuleta (uncles)

Iván Zuleta Barros (Note: In this Spanish name, the first or paternal surname is Zuleta and the second or maternal family name is Barros.) (born 1976) is a Colombian accordionist. He played accordion with Diomedes Díaz in the 1990s, and won the accordionist competition of the Vallenato Legend Festival in 2025.

== Biography ==
Zuleta was born on 27 October 1976 in Urumita, in the Colombian department of La Guajira, to Fabio Zuleta Díaz and Denia Barros. Emiliano Zuleta Baquero is his paternal grandfather.

Zuleta began performing at the age of 8, and in 1988 was rey infantil at the Vallenato Legend Festival. At 18 he recorded the album Un Canto Celestial with Diomedes Díaz, replacing Juancho Rois (who had died in a plane crash in 1994) as Díaz' accordionist. Zuleta later left Díaz, who was in legal trouble, to tour Europe with Julio Iglesias.

In 2025 Zuleta won the professional accordionist competition of the Vallenato Legend Festival, and was conferred the title of vallenato king (Spanish: rey vallenato). In the final, Zuleta performed the songs "El Gallo Viejo", "La Pule", "María de Jesús" and "A la Dinastía Zuleta". Jairo Andrés de la Ossa Otero and Camilo Andrés Molina Luna came in second and third place respectively. El Heraldo wrote that Zuleta's win was "more than a personal victory, it represents recognition of a dynasty of musical tradition that has shaped vallenato from its roots: the Zuleta family." Zuleta pledged his winnings to charity, saying "I don't need the prize money. I'm going to donate it to a foundation for the rehabilitation of homeless people with addiction problems."
