= Julián Rojas =

Colombian accordionist

- Born: Julián Rojas Teherán; 23 July 1970 (age 55); San Andrés, Colombia
- Genres: Vallenato
- Instruments: Diatonic button accordion

Julián Rojas Teherán (Note: In this Spanish name, the first or paternal surname is Rojas and the second or maternal family name is Teherán.) (born 1970) is a Colombian vallenato accordionist. In 1991 he was crowned vallenato king for winning the professional accordionist competition of the Vallenato Legend Festival.

== Biography ==
=== Early life and education ===
Rojas was born on 23 July 1970 in San Andrés, a Colombian island in the Caribbean Sea, to José Gabriel Rojas and Ligia Teherán. He is the youngest of nine children.

At the age of 5, Rojas started learning accordion on the instrument belonging to his brother Jorge. He attended primary school in San Andrés and started high school in Bogotá, but did not graduate.

=== Music career ===
In 1988, Rojas competed in the professional accordionist competition of the Vallenato Legend Festival, where he came third. He then went to work with Binomio de Oro, and was encouraged by Juancho Rois to compete again. Rojas competed again in 1991, using an accordion that he borrowed from Rois; Rois also competed, and was the favourite to win. Rojas won the competition and the title of vallenato king, with Rois coming second and Gabriel Julio coming third.

Rojas later performed with other vallenato artists including Pedro García Díaz and Jairo Serrano. He has competed in the king of kings competition of the Vallenato Legend Festival, and has won the professional accordionist competitions of the Festival Cuna de Acordeones in Villanueva and the Festival de Acordeones de Magdalena Medio in Barrancabermeja.
