= Calixto Ochoa =

Colombian musician and songwriter

- Born: Calixto Antonio Ochoa Campo; 14 August 1934; Valencia de Jesús, Colombia
- Died: 18 November 2015 (aged 81) Sincelejo, Colombia
- Genres: vallenato
- Spouse: Dulzaide Bermúdez

Calixto Antonio Ochoa Campo (1934–2015) was a Colombian accordionist and songwriter. He won the accordionist competition of the Festival de la Leyenda Vallenata in 1970, was a member of Los Corraleros de Majagual, and composed over 120 songs that were recorded by artists including Diomedes Díaz and Wilfrido Vargas.

== Biography ==
Calixto Ochoa was born on 14 August 1934 in Valencia de Jesús, in the Colombian department of Cesar (but at that time still in Magdalena).

As a child Ochoa watched his brothers Juan and Rafael play accordion at vallenato parrandas. After buying his own accordion, he learned to play the songs of Luis Enrique Martínez. Ochoa moved to Sincelejo, and at the age of 21 recorded his first song, "El Lirio Rojo", which attracted the attention of Antonio Fuentes, owner of Discos Fuentes. In 1962, when Ochoa was at "the height of his fame", he joined Los Corraleros de Majagual at the invitation of Fuentes, with whom he toured several countries in the Americas.

Ochoa won the accordionist competition at the third Festival de la Leyenda Vallenata in 1970. In 2005 the Festival gave him the title "King for life" (Spanish: Rey vitalicio), alongside Rafael Escalona, Emiliano Zuleta, Leandro Díaz, and Adolfo Pacheco.

Ochoa died on 18 November 2015 in Sincelejo. His body was displayed at the Iglesia La Concepción in Valledupar, and then moved to his birthplace Valencia de Jesús on 20 November, where he was buried.

== Musical style and compositions ==
Ochoa was a prolific songwriter in the Colombian genre of vallenato. His notable compositions include "Los Sabanales", "Diana", "El Calabacito", "El Mosquito", "El Africano", and "Playas Marinas". In total he wrote over 120 songs.

Ochoa was the favourite songwriter of Diomedes Díaz, who recorded more than 30 of his compositions, including "La Plata" and "Los Sabanales". His song "El Africano" was made popular by Wilfrido Vargas and recorded by La Sonora Dinamita, Fruko y sus Tesos, Ray Conniff and Georgie Dann.
