= The Children of Vallenato =

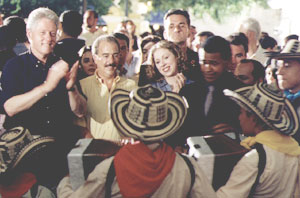
US President Bill Clinton and daughter Chelsea during a visit to Cartagena, Colombia, where they were greeted by The Children of Vallenato.

The Children of Vallenato (Spanish: Los niños del vallenato) is a vallenato musical group of children. The group was created by the Vallenato Legend Festival Foundation, to promote future artist for this musical genre. The group has performed throughout the world, in many countries, including a personal presentation for former US president Bill Clinton at the White House.
