= Carlos Huertas (vallenato composer) =

Colombian musician (1934–1999)

Carlos Huertas Gómez (October 21, 1934, in Dibuya, La Guajira – September 18, 1999, in Maicao, La Guajira) was a Colombian vallenato music composer predominantly, singer and guitarist. At the age of 16, Huertas traveled from his hometown to Venezuela to study music at a conservatory, composing in different genres such as paseo vallenato, pasaje, merengue vallenato, joropo, gaita, porro, vals, bolero, pasillo, bambuco and other Caribbean rhythms.

Huertas was a son of Carlos Modesto Huertas Gómez and Dolores Gómez Gómez. His father also a musician played the flute, the guitar and the tiple. His grandfather Atinio Huertas, was also a musician and was the director of an orchestra in Riohacha. Huertas was considered a passionate for his homeland the Guajira Peninsula, and most of his songs were dedicated to the people, traditions and subjects relating to it.

Songs by Huertas were recorded by numerous artists including Alfredo Gutiérrez, Elías Rosado and Juancho Rois, Silvio Brito, Los Melódicos de Venezuela, Los Hermanos Zuleta, Los Hermanos López and Jorge Oñate along Colacho Mendoza, and Carlos Vives who ultimately contributed to the internationalization of Huertas' songs including El Cantor de Fonseca a song written by Huertas about his own life in La Guajira leaving a historical account of his whereabouts in life.
