= Golden Congo =

Colombian music award

- Congo de Oro
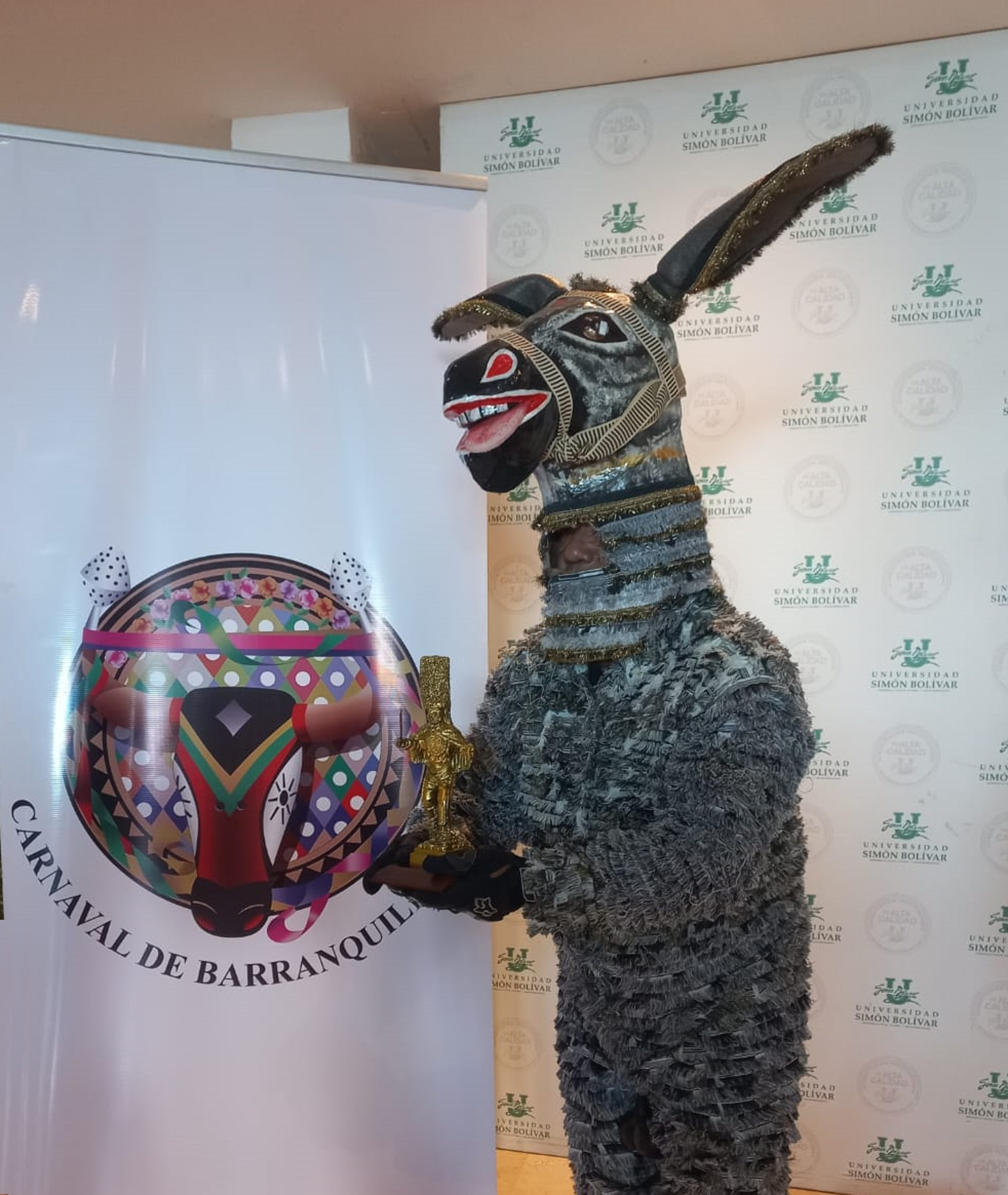
- A Golden Congo being held by a Burro Corcoveón in 2023
- Country: Colombia
- Presented by: Barranquilla Carnival
- First award: 1969
- Website: carnavaldebarranquilla.org/tradicion/congo-de-oro/

The Golden Congo (Spanish: Congo de Oro) is a Colombian music award that since its founding in 1969 has been presented annually at the Orchestra Festival (Spanish: Festival de Orquestas) of the Barranquilla Carnival.

Until recently, the Golden Congo award comprised six genre prizes: Vallenato (since 1978), Merengue (since 1994), Tropical (since 1994), Salsa (since 1994), Urbano (since 2012), Folk (1992–4, and again since 2018), and four additional prizes: Newcomer, Best Vocalist, Best Instrumentalist and Lo Nuestro ("What's Ours"). Since 2025, only one Golden Congo is awarded each year.

== Winners ==
=== 2024–2026 ===
Since the 2025 Orchestra Festival, only one Golden Congo is awarded each year.

Year	Winner	2nd place	3rd place	Refs.
2026	Dolcey Miguel Gutiérrez	Akanny	Encanto Millero	
2025	Byordy	La Charanga del Sur	Luismi Yánez	

In 2024 the Barranquilla Carnival celebrated its 20th incarnation since being proclaimed intangible cultural heritage by UNESCO in 2003. As part of the celebrations, the Orchestra Festival did not hold a competition for the Golden Congo, but instead awarded one to every performer.

Year	Recipients of a Golden Congo
2024	La Orquesta Internacional de la Policía, Gaiteros de San Jacinto Nueva Generación, Zona 8 Orquesta, Mary Ángel Sanabria, Tubará Reggae, Dionis K da Uno, Son del Sabor, Orquesta Klasica de Ibagué, Los Diferentes del Vallenato, Rafa Pérez, Omar Enrique, Will Fiorillo, La Carmen, Álvaro Ricardo, Cris & Ronny

=== 2012–2023 ===
In 2012 Golden Congos for "best performance" (Spanish: variations on mejor intérprete or mejor instrumentista) and "urbano music" were given for the first time, and the "newcomer" (Spanish: revelación) prize was reintroduced. In 2016 the Golden Congo for performance was split into separate prizes for vocalists and instrumentalists, and in 2018 "folk" was reintroduced as a genre category.

On the 50th anniversary of the Orchestra Festival in 2019 no awards were given; instead, past competitors and winners returned to perform at the festival, including Los Corraleros de Majagual, Los Gaiteros de San Jacinto, Pacho Galán, Checo Acosta, Juan Piña, Poncho Zuleta, Sergio Vargas, Beto Zabaleta, Eddy Herrera, Bazurto All Stars, and Jorge Oñate. In 2021 there was no Barranquilla Carnival due to the COVID-19 pandemic; the Orchestra Festival held a virtual event featuring past performances.

Year	Vallenato	Merengue	Tropical	Salsa	Urbano	Folk	Newcomer	Best Vocalist	Best Instrumentalist	Lo Nuestro
2023	Juan Sajona and Ricardo Oñate	Terranova Orquesta	Orquesta Klásica de Ibagué	Charanga Joven	Juanda Caribe	Gaiteros de San Jacinto Nueva Generación	Yeison Landero	Ricardo Oñate	Daniel Vega Franco	—
2022	Nelson Velásquez	Dionis K-Da Uno	Súper Combo Latino	Danny Daniel	Óscar Prince	C-Tambó	Juanda Caribe	Caliope	Joan Camilo Silvera	—
2021	Festival cancelled due to the COVID-19 pandemic.									
2020	Fausto Chatela	Kumbelé Orquesta	Súper Combo Latino de Montería	Ray Palacio	Willy Fiorillo	Las Alegres Ambulancias	Bahía Sokus	Estefanie Mercedes	Jorge Antonio Negrette	—
2019	No awards given, as past winners were honoured for the festival's 50th anniversary.									
2018	Fello Zabaleta	RH Positivo	La Nómina del Pin	Charanga del Sur	Bazurto All Star	La Banda de Nayo	Linica	Danny Daniel	Nayo	Cumbia Caribe
2017	Evelyn	Kumbelé Orquesta	La Nómina del Pin	Fausto Chatela	Grupo Scala	—	—	Fausto Chatela	Wendy Corzo	La Banda de Nayo
2016	Dyonell Velásquez	Los Inéditos	La Nómina del Pin	Johnny "El Bravo" López	Bazurto All Stars	—	—	Andrés Prado (from the group of "El Bravo")	Dyonell Velásquez (accordion)	La Banda de Nayo
2016	Dyonell Velásquez	Los Inéditos	La Nómina del Pin	Johnny "El Bravo" López	Bazurto All Stars	—	—	Andrés Prado (from the group of "El Bravo")	Nayo (flute)	La Banda de Nayo
Year	Vallenato	Merengue	Tropical	Salsa	Urbano	Folk	Newcomer	Best Performance		Lo Nuestro
2015	Andrés Ariza Villazón & Luis Campillo	Bandola Orquesta	Edwin Gómez	Bandola Orquesta	Mr. Black	—	Dyonnel Velásquez	Nayo		C-Tambó
2014	Churo Díaz & Elías Mendoza	Sergio Vargas	Voces de Billo Hoy	Pachalo y su Son Cubano	Africaribe	—	Bandé Orquesta	Rafael Gavilán Pachalo		La Banda de Nayo
2013	Peter Manjarrés	—	La Nómina del Pin	Orquesta Broadway de Cuba	Kevin Flórez	—	Fausto Chatela	Miguel Romero		Álvaro Ricardo
2012	Iván Villazón	Bonny Cepeda	La Nómina del Pin	Danny Daniel	Punto G	—	Orquesta Bareke	Elías Mendoza		Los Gaiteros de San Jacinto
"—" denotes no award given or no information available.

=== 1995–2011 ===
In 1995 the categories "newcomer" and "folk group" were discontinued, and a prize was introduced called the "Premio Rescate de lo Nuestro" (English: rescuing what is ours prize). It later became known as simply "Lo Nuestro", and at one point as "Lo Nuestro 'Roberto de Castro'".

Year	Vallenato	Merengue	Tropical	Salsa	Lo Nuestro
2011	Kvrass	Wilfrido Vargas	Álvaro Ricardo	Orquesta de la Policía Nacional	Punto G
2010	Iván Villazón	Eddy Herrera	Checo Acosta y su Orquesta	Richie Ray & Bobby Cruz	Álvaro Ricardo
2009	Jorge Celedón	RH Positivo	Checo Acosta	Andy Montañez	Totó la Momposina
2008	Peter Manjarrés	Bananas	Gran Orquesta del Carnaval	Estrellas de Niche	Fusión Orquesta
2007	Iván Villazón	Milly Quezada	Checo Acosta	Adolescente	Cumbia Caribe
2006	Peter Manjarrés	Los Vecinos	Son de Ovejas	Richie Ray & Bobby Cruz	—
2005	Iván Villazón	Eddy Herrera	Fusión Atlántico	José Alberto "El Canario"	—
2004	—	Eddy Herrera	Checo Acosta	Trabuko	—
2003	—	—	Fusión Orquesta	Kimbombó	Son de Ovejas
2002	—	RH Positivo	Jacaranda Show	Kimbombó	Son Mocaná
2001	—	RH Positivo	Shekeré	Orquesta Kimbombó	La Franja
2000	—	Factor RH	Fascinación Caribe	Guayacán Orquesta	La Franja
1999	—	La Clave	Checo Acosta	Grupo Niche	—
1998	Iván Villazón & Franco Argelles	Los Generales	Joe Arroyo with La Matica de Patilla	Grupo Clase	Checo Acosta
1997	Iván Villazón and Franco Argelles	La Clave (national)	Joe Arroyo	Grupo Niche (national)	Checo Acosta
1997	Iván Villazón and Franco Argelles	Los Toros Band and Kinito Méndez (external)	Cohiba de Cuba (external)	Grupo Niche (national)	Checo Acosta
1996	Binomio de Oro	La Clave (national)	Checo Acosta	—	—
1996	Binomio de Oro	Rikarena (external)	Checo Acosta	—	—
1995	Iván Villazón & Franco Argelles	Bananas	Joe Arroyo (national)	Grupo Niche (national)	Zoila Nieto
1995	Iván Villazón & Franco Argelles	Eddie Herrera (external)	Joe Arroyo (national)	Irakere (external)	Zoila Nieto
"—" denotes no award given or no information available.

=== 1994 ===
In 1994 prizes for the musical genres of merengue, tropical, and salsa were introduced, in place of "orchestra" and "ensemble". 1994 was also the last year that "newcomer" and "folk group" were awarded until their return in 2012 and 2018 respectively.

Year	Vallenato/Accordion	Merengue	Tropical	Salsa	Newcomer	Folk Group
1994	Los Betos	Grupo Bananas	Checo Acosta	El Gran Combo de Puerto Rico	La Clave	Swing Barranquilla

=== 1989–1993 ===
In 1989 the category of "newcomer" (Spanish: revelación) was awarded for the first time, and in 1992 "folk group" (Spanish: grupo folclórico) was introduced as a category; both were discontinued after 1994 and reintroduced in the 2010s.

Year	Orchestra	Ensemble/Group	Vallenato/Accordion	Newcomer	Folk Group
1993	Grupo Niche (national)	Los Tupamaros	Julio Rojas & Joaco Pertuz	Los Alfa 8	Juan Piña
1993	La Sonora Ponceña (external)	Los Tupamaros	Julio Rojas & Joaco Pertuz	Los Alfa 8	Juan Piña
1992	Los Inéditos (national)	—	Binomio de Oro	—	Son Cartagena
1992	Oscar De León (external)	—	Binomio de Oro	—	Son Cartagena
1991	Los Inéditos	Nando Pérez (tropical)	Binomio de Oro	Joseíto Martínez	—
1991	Los Inéditos	Grupo Niche (salsa)	Binomio de Oro	Joseíto Martínez	—
1990	Los Tupamaros (national)	Grupo Raíces	Diomedes Díaz	La Innovación	—
1990	Josie Esteban y la Patrulla 15 (external)	Grupo Raíces	Diomedes Díaz	La Innovación	—
1989	Pacho Galán	Joe Arroyo (tropical)	Binomio de Oro	Los Tímidos	—
1989	Pacho Galán	Grupo Clase (external)	Binomio de Oro	Los Tímidos	—
"—" denotes no award given or no information available.

=== 1978–1988 ===
In 1978 the category of "vallenato" was introduced, which was also sometimes awarded as "accordion". The "ensemble" prize was occasionally awarded as "group" (Spanish: combo) instead. From 1981 the ensemble prize was regularly split by either genre (tropical/salsa) or by nationality.

Year	Orchestra	Ensemble/Group	Vallenato/Accordion
1988	Joe Arroyo (national)	Los Inéditos	Binomio de Oro
1988	Los Tupamaros (national)	Los Inéditos	Binomio de Oro
1987	Pacho Galán	Joe Arroyo (national)	Binomio de Oro
1987	Pacho Galán	Wilfrido Vargas (external)	Binomio de Oro
1986	Hermanos Martelo	Joe Arroyo (national)	Los Hermanos Zuleta
1986	Hermanos Martelo	Wilfrido Vargas (external)	Los Hermanos Zuleta
1985	Los Caribes	Joe Arroyo (national)	Jorge Oñate
1985	Los Caribes	Johnny Ventura & Los Vecinos (external)	Jorge Oñate
1984	Hermanos Martelo	Joe Arroyo (national)	Jorge Oñate
1984	Hermanos Martelo	Johnny Ventura & Los Vecinos (external)	Jorge Oñate
1983	Hermanos Martelo	Juan Piña (tropical)	Diomedes Díaz
1983	Hermanos Martelo	Cuco Valoy (salsa)	Diomedes Díaz
1982	Pacho Galán	Gabriel Romero (tropical)	El Doble Poder
1982	Pacho Galán	Wilfrido Vargas (salsa)	El Doble Poder
1981	Pacho Galán	Juan Piña (tropical)	Jorge Oñate
1981	Pacho Galán	Cuco Valoy (salsa)	Jorge Oñate
1980	Los Melódicos	Juan Piña	Alfredo Gutiérrez
1979	Los Melódicos	Pastor López y sus famosas Caleñas	Jorge Oñate
1978	Pacho Galán	Fruko y sus Tesos	Binomio de Oro

=== 1969–1977 ===
From 1969 to 1977 the only categories were "orchestra" (Spanish: orquesta) and "ensemble" (Spanish: conjunto).

Year	Orchestra	Ensemble
1977	Pacho Galán	Adolfo Echeverría
1976	Los Caribes	Alfredo Gutiérrez
1975	Hermanos Martelo	Nelson Henríquez
1974	Pacho Galán	Fruko y sus Tesos
1973	Lucho Bermúdez	Nelson Henríquez
1972	Los Melódicos	Afrocombo
1972	Papa Molina (small orchestra)	Afrocombo
1971	Hermanos Martelo	Los Graduados
1970	Hermanos Martelo	La Sonora Matancera
1969	Billo's Caracas Boys	Los Corraleros de Majagual

== Special awards ==
Occasionally special Golden Congos are given to recognise particular achievements.

=== The Super Congo ===
The Super Congo (also called the Super Congo de Oro or the Supercongo) was created in 1990 specifically to honour Joe Arroyo, who had won a Golden Congo at each of the 6 preceding festivals. Since then the Super Congo has been awarded several times.

Recipients of a Super Congo
Year	Recipient
1990	Joe Arroyo
1991	Los Hermanos Rosario
1998	Shakira
2013	Checo Acosta
2014	Grupo Niche
2014	Jorge Oñate
2026	Aníbal Velásquez

=== Rey del Pueblo ===
Twice a Rey del Pueblo (King of the People) has been crowned at the Orchestra Festival, decided by a public vote.

Year	Recipient
2014	Martín Elías & Juancho De la Espriella
2015	Cuco Valoy

=== Platinum congo ===
Since 2025 a Platinum Congo (Congo Platino) has been awarded via audience applause.

Year	Recipient
2025	Orquesta La Máxima
2026	Martín Elías Jr.

=== Unique awards ===
Some Golden Congos have only been given once. In 1985 Alejo Durán was awarded the "Special Congo" (Spanish: Congo Especial). In 1989 Alfredo de la Fe won a Golden Congo for "Best Solo Artist". In 1994 Cristian del Real received an honourable mention as the "boy genius of the timbal."

== Related awards ==
Golden Congos are also given for floats and dancers that take part in the Battle of the Flowers parade of the Barranquilla Carnival.

=== Night of Orchestras ===
At the Barranquilla Carnival Night of Orchestras (Spanish: Noche de Orquestas) a jury awards Golden Congos in the same genre categories (Note: i.e. vallenato, merengue, tropical, salsa, urbano, folk) as the Orchestra Festival, and in addition awards the "Antonio María Peñaloza" prize for an unpublished song. The competition at the Night of Orchestras is open to musicians and groups from Barranquilla and the surrounding region.

The awards at the Night of Orchestras were first given in 2018, and the winners received automatic entry to the competition at the Orchestra Festival that year. In 2019 no competition was held at the Orchestra Festival, and since then winners at the Night of Orchestras have been granted entry to the Orchestra Festival the following year, as opposed to the same year.

Winners of the Golden Congo at the Night of Orchestras
Year	Vallenato	Merengue	Tropical	Salsa	Urbano	Folk	Newcomer	Best Vocalist	Best Instrumentalist	Best Orchestra
2025	Martín Elías Jr.	Terranova	Encantó Millero	Profesionales Latin Music	Akanny	—	—	—	—	—
2024	Abel Cantillo	La Máxima Orquesta	Grupo Musical Warundaimo	Luismi Yanes	Dinastía Valdez	Miriam Negrete	Maribella	Álvaro Alcocer	Eimar Martínez	—
2023	María Ángel Sanabria	Zona 8 Orquesta	La Carmen	—	Tubará	—	Enkelé Voces y Tambores	Miriam Negrete	Franco Hernández de Curbelo	—
2022	Los Diferentes	Marisella	Banda Músicos de mi Tierra	Zumbalé Orquesta Internacional	Nobleza Music Álvaro Eugenio Camargo	Marlón De la Peña & his group Viento y Tambó	Charanga Jóven	María Paula Meza (Músicos de mi Tierra)	Luis Miguel Yanes, (Timbales, Charanga Jóven)	—
2021	Festival cancelled due to the COVID-19 pandemic.									
2020	Lino Quiroz	Dionis K da Uno	Nolan Orquesta	Orquesta Son del Sabor	Bahía Zokus	—	—	Enrique Paba	—	La Mayor de Curramba
2019	Los de Juancho	Calipso	Orquesta Súper Combo Latino	A 4 Varas	Óscar Prince	Son Palenque	Área 22	Luis Ter La Voz	Franco Antonio Hernández Arroyabe	—
2018	Orla Sandoval e Iván de Hoyos	—	Juancho Naranjo	Ébano	Linica	Conjunto Tradición	—	Galapa Orquesta	Joaquín Pérez (gaita)	—
2018	Orla Sandoval e Iván de Hoyos	—	Juancho Naranjo	Ébano	Linica	Conjunto Tradición	—	Galapa Orquesta	Jesús Avendaño (guitar)	—
"—" denotes no award given or no information available.

Winners of the "Antonio María Peñaloza" Golden Congo for an unpublished song
Year	Position	Title	Performer	Writer
2024	1st place	"Para ser Feliz"	Revolú	Ronald Polo
2024	2nd place	"De Todo Para Todos"	Byordi	Yordy Beleño & Carlos Díaz
2024	3rd place	"A Ritmo de Carnaval"	Marlon Hincapié, Fidet Leotav, Jorge Salcedo	
2023	1st place	"La Madre Tierra"	Son Son	—
2023	2nd place	"Mi Historia"	Marelvis Herrera	—
2023	3rd place	"Barranquilla de Puro Corazón"	Astroson Orquesta	—
2022	1st place	"Agua Bendita"	Viento y Tambó	Luis Vega, Marlón De la Peña
2022	2nd place	"Mil Años"	Charanga Jóven	Jorge Salgado
2022	3rd place	"No Soy la Chica del Momento"	Zumbalé Orquesta Internacional	Luis Clavijo
2021	Festival cancelled due to the COVID-19 pandemic.			
2020	1st place	"Vacilale al Carnaval"	Long Play Band	Lina Pineda
2020	2nd place	"Barranquilla Tiene Swing"	Nolan Orquesta	Frank Guerrero
2020	3rd place	"Ven a Barranquilla"	Macondo de Colombia	José Jin Martínez
2019	1st place	"Parranda en Carnaval"	Jhon Harby Ubaque	
2019	2nd place	"Tortolita"	Son Palenque	Justo Valdez Cáceres
2019	3rd place	"Joselito Carnavalero"	Súper Combo Latino	Terinzon Díaz Carmona
2018	1st place	"Homenaje a Barranquilla"	Juancho Naranjo	Tevinson Díaz
"—" denotes no award given or no information available.
