= Fabri Meriño =

Colombian accordionist

- Born: Fabriciana Meriño Manjarrez; 21 May 1952; El Molino, Colombia
- Died: 23 November 1971 (aged 19) Turbaco, Colombia
- Genres: Vallenato
- Years active: 1967–1971

Fabriciana Meriño Manjarrez (Note: In this Spanish name, the first or paternal surname is Meriño and the second or maternal family name is Manjarrez.) (21 May 1952 – 23 November 1971), known as Fabri Meriño, was a Colombian vallenato accordionist. She competed in the accordionist competition of the first Vallenato Legend Festival in 1968, and played in the bands of Alfredo Gutiérrez and Aníbal Velásquez before her death in a road accident at the age of 19.

== Biography ==
=== Early life ===
Fabri Meriño was born on 21 May 1952 in El Molino, in the Colombian department of La Guajira. Her mother was Francisca Manjarrez, and her maternal grandfather Manuel Salinas was an accordionist. Meriño was taught accordion in El Molino by José Oviedo Pedraza, starting in 1967. Her brothers pooled money to buy her a Hohner accordion.

=== Music career ===
Meriño competed in the accordionist competition of the first Vallenato Legend Festival in 1968, at the age of 16, losing to Alejo Durán. Following her performance, Alfredo Gutiérrez asked her to join his band; Meriño's mother refused, but she did play some shows with him. Meriño then formed a vallenato conjunto with her brothers Agustín, Osmel, and José Manuel, and travelled with them to Maracaibo, Venezuela.

In Maracaibo, Meriño acquired a Paolo Soprani accordion, which she played at the 1969 Vallenato Legend Festival, where she competed in the newly created amateur accordionist category. She passed the first round, but was disqualified from the second round after being intentionally delayed. Meriño competed again in 1970, but lost in the first round.

At the 1969 Festival, Aníbal Velásquez asked Meriño to join his conjunto, and she toured with him for the next two years, alongside vocalist Amparo Quiceno. Meriño appeared on some recordings with the group, including the guaracha "Mambo Loco".

=== Personal life and death ===
In Venezuela, Meriño met the musician Francisco Parada Salcedo, with whom she had a daughter Lisbeth when she was 17.

Meriño died in 23 November 1971 when the bus she was in crashed on the outskirts of Turbaco. José Velásquez wrote the song "Homenaje a Faby Meriño" in her memory.
