= Gustavo Gutiérrez Cabello =

Colombian songwriter and singer

- Also known as: El Poeta; El Seco; El Flaco de Oro; El Romancero del Vallenato
- Born: Gustavo Enrique Gutiérrez Cabello; 12 September 1940 (age 85); Valledupar, Colombia
- Genres: Vallenato

Gustavo Enrique Gutiérrez Cabello (Note: In this Spanish name, the first or paternal surname is Gutiérrez and the second or maternal family name is Cabello.) (born 1940) is a Colombian vallenato songwriter and singer. He has twice won the unpublished song competition of the Vallenato Legend Festival, and his compositions have been recorded by artists including Iván Villazón and Binomio de Oro.

== Biography ==
=== Early life and education ===
Gustavo Enrique Gutiérrez Cabello was born on 12 September 1940 in Valledupar, in the Colombian department of Cesar. His mother was Teotiste Cabello Pimienta, and his father was Evaristo Gutiérrez Araújo.

As a child, Gutiérrez was introduced to the works of the Colombian poet Jorge Robledo Ortiz and Argentine songwriter Antonio Comas by his father. He learned to play guitar and accordion, and attended school in Valledupar. In 1970, Gutiérrez graduated from the Universidad EAN in Bogotá with a degree in business administration.

=== Songwriting career ===
In the 1970s Gutiérrez directed the tourism office of Valledupar, where he was involved in organising five successive editions of the Vallenato Legend Festival. He won the unpublished song competition of the 1969 Festival with "Rumores de Viejas Voces", and after five years at the tourism office he quit his job to have more time for songwriting. Gutiérrez won the unpublished song competition again in 1982, with "Paisaje de Sol".

Gutiérrez has written over 100 songs. They have been recorded by artists including Alfredo Gutiérrez, Los Hermanos Zuleta, Binomio de Oro, and Iván Villazón. He writes in the genre of vallenato, and his notable compositions include "Confidencias", "Sin Medir Distancias", and "Así Fue Mi Querer". His most recent album Cuando Pasan los Años was released in 2023, and features several well-known vallenato accordionists, including Almes and Hugo Carlos Granados, Julián Rojas, and Emiliano Zuleta Díaz.

=== Personal life ===
Gutiérrez met his wife, a journalist, when she interviewed him at the 1989 Vallenato Legend Festival. They have two children.
