= Hortensia Lanao =

Colombian songwriter

Hortensia Lanao de Rozo
- Born: 16 February 1928; Santa Marta, Colombia
- Died: September 2023 (aged 95)
- Genres: Vallenato

Hortensia Lanao de Rozo (1928–2023) was a Colombian teacher and vallenato songwriter. She was the first woman to win the unpublished song competition of the Vallenato Legend Festival, with the paseo "¿Qué hago Señor?" which she wrote about the murder of her friend Milciades Cantillo Costa.

== Biography ==
Lanao was born on 16 February 1928 in Santa Marta, in the Colombian department of Magdalena. She worked as a teacher in Valledupar.

In 1995, Lanao won the unpublished song competition of the Vallenato Legend Festival, with the paseo "¿Qué hago Señor?". She was 67 years old at the time, and was the first woman to have won the competition. Lanao wrote "¿Qué Hago Señor?" in two hours, and it concerns the murder of her friend Milciades Cantillo Costa by hitmen. The song was performed at the festival by La Decisión Vallenata, with Erick Escobar on vocals and "Nayo" Quintero on accordion. Lanao had entered the competition five times before, but always using the pseudonym "Flor del Valle"; 1995 was the first year that she entered under her own name. The competition had 234 other entries, including compositions by Santander Durán Escalona and Luis Egurrola.

Lanao had seven children. She died in September 2023.
