= Julio Rojas =

Julio Rojas may refer to:

- Julio Rojas Buendía (1958–2016), Colombian accordionist
- Julio Rojas Gutiérrez (born 1965), Chilean television writer and director, The Life of Fish et al.
- Julio Rojas Rojas (born 1895), Chilean politician
- Tito Rojas (Julio César Rojas López, 1955–2020), Puerto Rican salsa singer
