= Colacho Mendoza =

Colombian accordionist

- Born: Nicolás Elías Mendoza Daza; April 15, 1936; Sabanas de Manuela, San Juan del Cesar, Colombia
- Died: September 27, 2003 (aged 67) Valledupar, Colombia
- Genre: Vallenato

Nicolás Elías Mendoza Daza (Note: In this Spanish name, the first or paternal surname is Mendoza and the second or maternal family name is Daza.) (April 15, 1936 – September 27, 2003), also known as Colacho Mendoza, was a Colombian vallenato accordionist. He was the second vallenato king of the Vallenato Legend Festival, and was the first winner of the king of kings competition in 1987. He accompanied prominent vallenato singers including Jorge Oñate and Diomedes Díaz.

== Biography ==
=== Early years ===
Mendoza was born on April 15, 1936, in the small village of Sabanas de Manuela, located in the municipality of San Juan del Cesar in the northern Colombian department of La Guajira. His parents were Andrés Mendoza and Juana Daza. Mendoza learned to play accordion in his hometown.

In 1950, Mendoza moved to Valledupar. There he met vallenato songwriter Rafael Escalona, whose songs he became known for performing.

=== The Vallenato Legend Festival ===
Mendoza won the professional accordionist competition of the second Vallenato Legend Festival in 1969, and was crowned vallenato king. In the final he performed the paseo "La Guacamaya Verde" (written by Luís Castrillón), the merengue "La Pule" (by Emiliano Zuleta), the puya "Elvirita Armenta" (by Simón Salas), and the son "Cuando el Tigre Está en la Cueva" (by Juan Muñoz). Andrés Landero came second, and Julio de la Ossa came third; the story goes that Luis Enrique Martínez was the favourite to win, but could not perform because he was drunk.

In 1987 the Vallenato Legend Festival held for the first time a "king of kings" competition, instead of its usual professional accordionist competition. The competition was open only to previous vallenato kings, and Mendoza won, notably beating Alejo Durán.

=== Collaborations ===
Mendoza played accordion with vallenato singers and musicians including Poncho Zuleta, Jorge Oñate, Diomedes Díaz, Silvio Brito, Pedro García, Ivo Díaz, and Rafael Santos Díaz. He was not particularly known as a songwriter, but he did write "De La Junta pa’ La Peña", "Morenita", "Corina", and several other songs.

=== Personal life and death ===
Mendoza was married to Fanny Zuleta in 1950, and had seven sons. He died on September 27, 2003 in Valledupar.
