= Náfer Durán =

Colombian accordionist and songwriter (1932–2026)

Background information
- Also known as: Naferito
- Born: Náfer Santiago Durán Díaz; 26 December 1932; El Paso, Colombia
- Died: 29 September 2026 (aged 93) Valledupar, Colombia
- Genre: Vallenato

Náfer Santiago Durán Díaz (Note: Also written Nafer. In this Spanish name, the first or paternal surname is Durán and the second or maternal family name is Díaz.) (26 December 1932 – 29 September 2026) was a Colombian accordionist and songwriter. In 1976 he was crowned rey vallenato by winning the accordionist competition of the Vallenato Legend Festival, and he played accordion on Diomedes Díaz's debut album.

== Life and career ==
Durán was born on 26 December 1932 in El Paso, in the Colombian department of Cesar (though at the time still in Magdalena). His parents were Náfer Donato Durán Mojica and Juana Francisca Díaz Villarreal, and Alejo Durán was his brother.

He was crowned rey vallenato when he won the accordionist competition of the Vallenato Legend Festival in 1976. Later that year he played accordion on Herencia Vallenata, the debut album of Diomedes Díaz. In 2009 Durán travelled to France, accompanied by guacharaquero Álvaro Mendoza and caja player Jorge Luis Zuleta, and a recording of their concert in Paris was released as a live album.

Durán married Rosibel Escorcia Mure in the 1950s, and they had twelve children together.

Durán died on 29 September 2026, at the age of 93.

== Compositions ==
Durán wrote songs in the genre of vallenato, and was particularly known for playing his accordion in a minor key. His best known song is "Sin Ti", which he wrote for his wife while he was away working in Mompox. The song has been recorded by Carlos Vives. Other notable compositions by Durán include "La Chimichagüera" (recorded in 1975 by Rafael Orozco and Emilio Oviedo), "El Estanquillo", and "Mi Lamento".
