= Kevin Flórez =

Colombian musician

- Born: Kevin Rafael Flórez Rodríguez; August 19, 1991 (age 33); Cartagena
- Other names: El Rey De La Champeta Urbana
- Occupation: Singer-songwriter
- Years active: 2013–present
- Spouse: Tatiana Pastrana
- Children: 4
- Awards: 2013 Congo de Oro; 2014 Premios Nuestra Tierra
- Musical career
- Genres: Champeta; Soukous
- Labels: Farra Rap Records; Passa Passa Sound System

Kevin Flórez (born Kevin Rafael Flórez Rodríguez, August 19, 1991) is a Colombian singer-songwriter. For his work in the urban champeta genre, he has won several local and national awards. He is known for songs like "La Invité a Bailar" (2013), "Con Ella" (2013), and "La Pikotera" (2019).

== Life and career ==
Flórez was born in Cartagena, Colombia on August 19, 1991. He made his debut in music with the album El Rey de la Champeta Urbana in 2013. The album was produced by Ronnie Molina.

In 2013 Flórez received the Congo de Oro award during Barranquilla's Carnival.

In 2014, it was reported that Flórez had a large following in social media, which at the time included 170,000 followers on Instagram.

In 2021, Flórez released the single "Borracho bailando champeta", cowritten with musician Captain Planet.

== Discography ==
- El Rey de la Champeta Urbana (2013)
- La Supremacía (2018)
- Young King (2020)

== Personal life ==
Flórez has two brothers and one sister. He is married with three daughters.
