= Alejo Durán =

Colombian musician and songwriter (1919–1989)

- Also known as: El Negro Grande
- Born: Gilberto Alejandro Durán Díaz; February 9, 1919; El Paso, Colombia
- Died: November 15, 1989 (aged 70) Montería, Colombia
- Genres: Vallenato
- Occupations: Accordionist; Singer; Composer
- Years active: 1943–1989

Gilberto Alejandro Durán Díaz (February 9, 1919 – November 15, 1989), known as Alejo Durán or "El Negro Grande" (the great black man), was a Colombian songwriter, singer, and accordionist. Durán won the accordionist competition of the first Vallenato Legend Festival in 1968, and in 1985 was awarded a Special Congo at the Barranquilla Carnival. He is considered one of the greatest vallenato musicians.

== Biography ==
=== Early life ===
Durán was born in El Paso (then in Magdalena, now Cesar) on February 9, 1919. His parents were Náfer Donato Durán Mojica and Juana Francisca Díaz Villarreal. Durán's parents worked at the Las Cabezas finca, and at the age of 10 he started working there too. Durán had two brothers (Náfer and Luis Felipe) and one sister.

Durán first started playing accordion at the age of 19. While working at Las Cabezas he wrote songs in his free time; one of his first songs, "Las Cocas", was written about the cooks at the finca. Durán continued to work at Las Cabezas as a cowboy's assistant until its closure in 1943. That year, at the encouragement of the owner of Las Cabezas, Durán went to Mompox to perform his song "Entusiasmo a las Mujeres" at the Teatro Atenas.

=== Recording career ===
In 1947 Durán began to work full-time as a musician. His first tour was in 1948, between Chiriguaná and Barranquilla. In 1950 Durán moved to Barranquilla, and sometime between 1949 and 1951 he recorded his first LP with a group comprising him on accordion, Carlos Vélez on guacharaca, Rafael Mojica on the caja, and Juan Madrid on guitar. In Barranquilla Durán formed friendships with fellow musicians Luis Enrique Martínez, Abel Antonio Villa, and José María Peñaranda.

After Barranquilla, Durán lived briefly in Magangué and then moved to Montería in 1957, where he started recording for Discos Fuentes. In 1959 he joined Discos Tropical, for whom he recorded several successful songs including "Besito Cortao" "Envejeces Corazón", "Bajo Sinú", "La Puerta Ele Tu Casa" "Ya Estoy Aquí", "Consejo de Madre", "La Trompeta", "Jazmín de Arabia", "Cosa Sabrosa", "Ceja Encontrada" and "Evangelina".

Durán moved to Planeta Rica in 1962, where he lived the rest of his life. He returned to Discos Fuentes in 1963, and recorded a string of successful vallenato songs, includuing "La Puya Vallenata", "Como Mañana Me Voy", "Evita Soto", "Los Campanales", "La Niña Guillo", "Palmito", "La Nueva Ola", "La Lengua", "Si Fueras Para Ayapel", "Fidelina" and "Altos del Rosario".

=== The Vallenato Legend Festival ===
Durán won the accordionist competition at the first Vallenato Legend Festival in 1968 with the songs "Alicia Adorada", "Corralito", and "Pedazo de Acordeón", the only competition entry that was in the style of puya. In doing so he defeated Abel Antonio Villa and Luis Enrique Martínez, both of whom had been more successful than him commercially. Emiliano Zuleta, another potentially strong competitor, was disqualified after failing to show up for the final round. Jaime Andrés Monsalve writes that "The decision on Durán's reign was unanimous, despite the favouritism of the established Luis Enrique Martínez."

Following his win, in 1969 Discos Tropical released an album of Durán's recordings called Festival Vallenato 1968. Primer premio. That same year Discos Fuentes released Los Campeones el Festival Vallenato!, a split album between Durán and Martínez.

For the 20th Vallenato Legend Festival in 1987, a competition was held between all previous winners (Note: Except Alberto Pacheco, who had died in 1983, and Alfredo Gutiérrez, who withdrew.) to determine a "King of Kings" (Spanish: Rey de Reyes). Durán competed again with the song "Pedazo de Acordeón", and famously stopped his performance part way through to withdraw, telling the crowd "I have just disqualified myself" (Spanish: "pueblo, me he acabado de descalificar yo mismo").

=== Personal life ===
Durán met Joselina Salas in El Yucal, Calamar in 1952, and they were married in 1953, though they later split. He spent the last years of his life with Gloria Dussan, whom he had met in 1975 when he was 56 and she was 16. Durán later claimed to have fathered 26 children, with no more than two sharing a mother. By some accounts the true number may be more than 40.

=== Death ===
On November 1, 1989, Durán performed his song "Pedazo de Acordeón" at the Festival of Accordionists and Composers in Chinú, against the advice of his doctor. He was sent to Montería on November 10 on account of heart problems, and died there on November 15, 1989 of a heart attack.

== Legacy ==
Durán is considered one of the best vallenato musicians of all time. In addition to winning the accordionist competition at the first Vallenato Legend Festival in 1968, he was awarded a Special Congo at the 1985 Barranquilla Carnival. Across his career he recorded 1800 songs, 120 LPs, and 200 78rpms.

Durán wrote more than 300 songs, which have been covered by artists including Carlos Vives, Los Hermanos Zuleta, and Diomedes Díaz. Colombian writer Juan Gossaín once described Durán as "the person I most admired in life."

== Durán's accordions ==
Durán played diatonic button accordions, some of which he gave names to. One of his early accordions was a two-row diatonic called "Guacamayo". This accordion was replaced by a three-row named "El Niño Bonito" which Durán was gifted by his friend Toño Andrade in the early 1960s. Later Génito Andrade, brother of Toño, gave Durán another three-row diatonic button accordion, which he named "El Pechichón".

=== Pedazo de Acordeón ===
Durán's friend Hernán Ramos gave him an accordion that he called "Pedazo de Acordeón". In 1966 Durán wrote a puya of the same name, which he used to win the first Vallenato Legend Festival.

This accordion was carried atop Durán's coffin at his funeral, and then passed to his brother Náfer Durán. In 1991 it was given to Julio Oñate Martínez, who wrote in his book El abc del Vallenato that he planned to donate it to the Museo de la Música Vallenata.
