= Valencia de Jesús =

Coordinates: 10°18′N 73°24′W

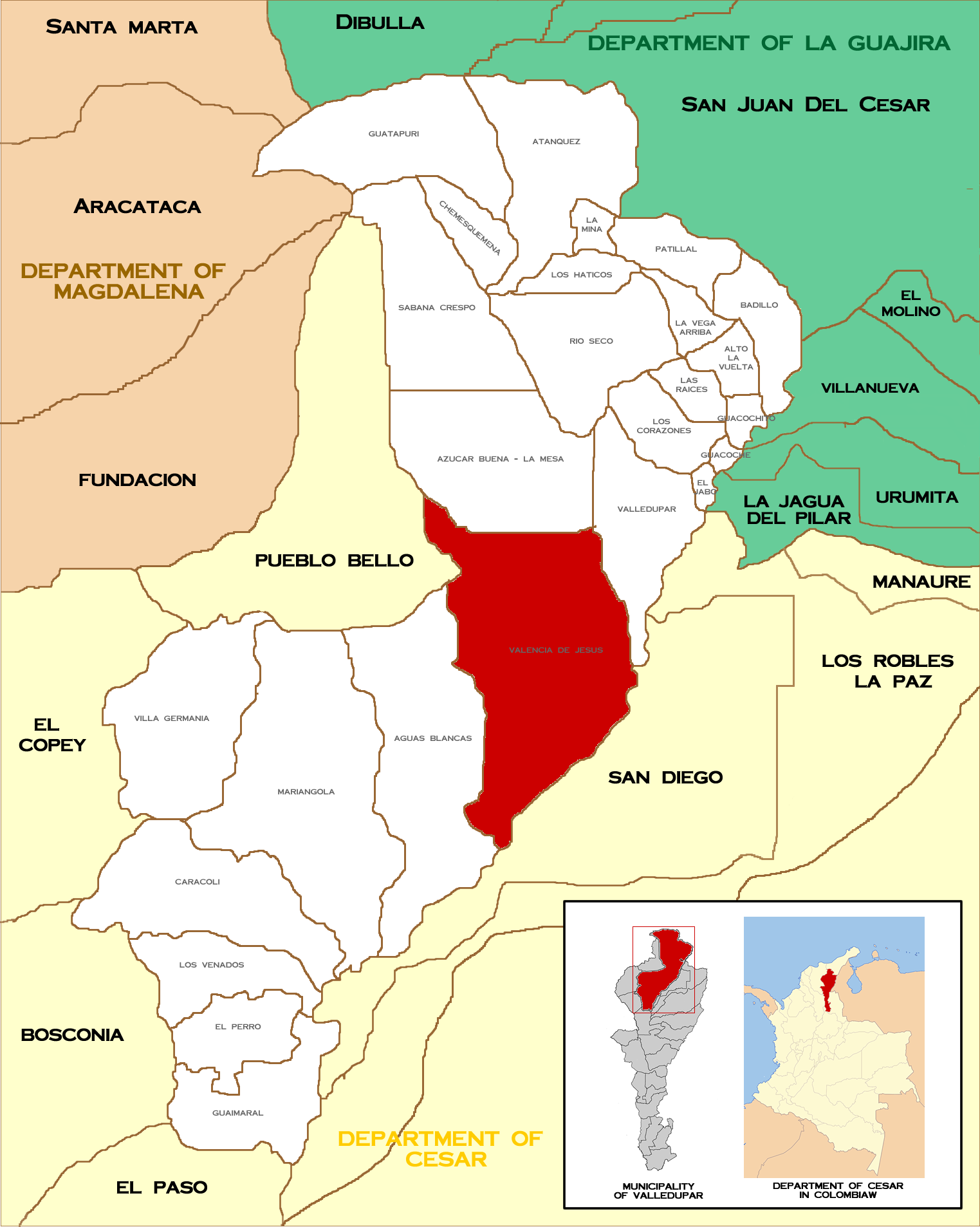
- Location in the municipality of Valledupar.
- Country: Colombia
- Department: Cesar
- Municipality: Valledupar
- Founded: 1590

Government
  - Type: Corregimiento
- Time zone: UTC-5

Valencia de Jesús is a populated center of Colombia and corregimiento of Valledupar in the Department of Cesar. The village is known for preserving one of the oldest churches in the Americas.

== History ==
The village was founded by Captain Antonio Florez in c. 1590 with the name Dulce Nombre de Jesus but due to constant attacks from the indigenous Chimila, the town was moved closer to Valledupar. The old village was named; Pueblo Viejo (named changed to Pueblo Bello in the 20th Century) and the new town; Nueva Valencia.

During the Spanish conquest and colonization of the Americas Valencia was a Spanish enclave similar in importance to Valledupar, functioning as seat of its municipality and its territory extended from Nabusimake to El Paso.

Valencia was also one of the most important religious centers in the region for the Community of the Dominicans which imposed on the Christian faith on the indigenous. The Parish of Valencia de Jesus back then limited to the north with Valledupar, Azúcar Buena I, to the west with the Garupal River, to the south with Espiritu Santo in between the Cesar River up to a locality named Alto Minas.

During the independence movement in the 19th Century, Valencia was considered a powerful village with an aristocrat base of inhabitants owners of large haciendas. After the revolt in Valledupar against the Spanish monarchical authorities, Valencia de Jesus sided with the King of Spain, Fernando VII organized and confronted the people of Valledupar, who defeated them. After the independence the village decayed and was added to Valledupar.
