= Adolfo Pacheco =

Colombian musician and songwriter

- Born: Adolfo Rafael Pacheco Anillo; 8 August 1940; San Jacinto, Colombia
- Died: 28 January 2023 (aged 82) Barranquilla, Colombia
- Years active: 1961–2023

Adolfo Rafael Pacheco Anillo (Note: In this Spanish name, the first or paternal surname is Pacheco and the second or maternal family name is Anillo.) (1940–2023) was a Colombian musician and songwriter. He composed several well-known songs in the Colombian folk music genre of vallenato, notably "La Hamaca Grande" which has been recorded by artists including Johnny Ventura and Carlos Vives.

== Biography ==
=== Early life and education ===
Adolfo Pacheco was born in San Jacinto, Colombia on 8 August 1940. His parents were Miguel Pacheco Blanco and Mercedes Anillo Herrera. Pacheco was named after Adolf Hitler, whose name was frequently heard by his parents on their radio around the time of his birth.

Pacheco attended secondary school in Ciénaga, Magdalena. He studied civil engineering for one year at Universidad Javeriana in Bogotá, but had to leave because his father, then responsible for 17 children with four women, could no longer afford to support him. Pacheco returned to San Jacinto and started working as a teacher, while playing music in his free time with friends Nasser Sir, Nelson Díaz, Andrés Landero, and Ramón Vargas.

=== Career ===
According to Pacheco, he was introduced to music by his paternal grandfather Laureano Antonio Pacheco Estrada, and his first composition was a puya called "Mazamorríta Cúa", written at the age of seven. In 1961 Pacheco recorded his cumbia "Sabor de Gaita" for Barranquilla record label Discos Tropical. By 1978 he had recorded nine LPs and several 45s for Tropical and for Discos Fuentes.

Pacheco's best-known composition is the vallenato "La Hamaca Grande", which he first performed in San Jacinto in 1969. The song gained recognition when Andrés Landero performed it at the 1970 Festival de la Leyenda Vallenata. It has been recorded more than 30 times by artists including Johnny Ventura, Lisandro Meza, Los Hermanos Zuleta, and Carlos Vives. The "compadre Ramón" in the opening line of the song refers to Pacheco's friend and collaborator Ramón Vargas.

Alongside working as a musician, Pacheco also worked as a primary school teacher, a councillor in San Jacinto, a baseball player, a member of the department assemblies of Bolívar and Atlántico for both the Colombian Conservative Party and the Colombian Liberal Party, and as director of the Bolívar Department of Transit. In 1976 he entered the University of Cartagena to study law, graduating in 1983.

In 2005 Pacheco was given the title "King for life" (Spanish: Rey vitalicio) at the Festival de la Leyenda Vallenata.

=== Death ===
On 19 January 2023 Pacheco was involved in a car accident while driving from San Jacinto to Barranquilla, and died nine days later on 28 January in a hospital in Barranquilla. At the time of his death Pacheco had recorded fifteen songs that were to be released alongside his autobiography Por los caminos de la Hamaca Grande, which was published by the Simón Bolívar University.

== Musical style and themes ==
Pacheco is best known for his compositions in the genre of vallenato, with notable examples including "El Mochuelo", "El Tropezón", "El Viejo Miguel", "Mercedes", and in particular "La Hamaca Grande". He also composed 16 cumbias, including "Mi machete", "Cuando Lo Negro Sea Bello", and "Sabor de Gaita", as well as merengues, boleros, son cubanos, corridos and bambucos. In total he wrote over 150 songs.
