= Emiliano Zuleta =

Colombian singer, vallenato songwriter and accordionist

- Also known as: El Viejo Mile
- Born: Emiliano Antonio Zuleta Baquero; January 11, 1912; La Jagua del Pilar, Colombia
- Died: October 30, 2005 (aged 93) Valledupar, Colombia
- Genres: vallenato
- Spouse: Carmen Díaz
- Children: 16, including Los Hermanos Zuleta

Emiliano Antonio Zuleta Baquero (1912–2005) was a Colombian vallenato songwriter, accordion player and singer, popularly known as El Viejo Mile (The Old Mile). Around 1938 he wrote "La Gota Fría", a song that emerged from a piqueria with Lorenzo Morales and that years later was recorded by Carlos Vives, turning the song into an international hit.

== Biography ==
Zuleta was born on January 11, 1912, in La Jagua del Pilar (then called La Jagua del Pedregal), a small town in La Guajira, Colombia. His parents were Cristóbal Zuleta Bermúdez, a guitarist and singer, and Sara María Baquero. Zuleta's mother was known in the vallenato community as "la vieja Sara", and is referenced by name in several vallenato songs.

As a teenager Zuleta learned to play caja and gaita with Cayetano Atencio. At the age of 15 he stole an accordion from his uncle Francisco Salas and taught himself to play.

The inaugural accordionist competition of the Festival de la Leyenda Vallenata was held in 1968, and Zuleta competed. He was disqualified after failing to return to the stage for the final round, because he was away celebrating his expected victory with friends. Instead, the competition was won by Alejo Durán. Zuleta competed again in 1971, coming third behind Luis Enrique Martínez and winner Alberto Pacheco. In 2005 the Festival gave him the title "King for life" (Spanish: Rey vitalicio), alongside Rafael Escalona, Calixto Ochoa, Leandro Díaz, and Adolfo Pacheco.

Zuleta had 8 children with his wife Carmen Díaz, including Emiliano and Poncho of Los Hermanos Zuleta, and 8 other children for a total of 16. He died on October 30, 2005, in Valledupar, Cesar, from respiratory problems at the age of 93.

== Musical style and compositions ==
Zuleta wrote songs in all four rhythms of vallenato, starting with his first merengue in 1927, and was particularly known for writing paseos. His notable compositions include "La Gota Fría", "Carmen Díaz", "Con La Misma Fuerza", "Doce Palabras", "El Indio Manuel María", "El Piñal", "El Regreso de Carmen", "El Robo", "El Zorro", "La Enfermedad de Emiliano", "La Pimientica", "La Pule", "Las Enfermeras", "Mis Hijos", "Mis Pocos Días" and "Villanueva".

=== "La Gota Fría" ===
Zuleta's best known composition is a paseo vallenato called "La Gota Fría". The song was written about Lorenzo Morales, born from a piqueria between the two that according to Zuleta lasted about 9 years.

Guillermo Buitrago recorded "La Gota Fría" (under the title "Que Criterio") in Ciénaga in 1945. Buitrago claimed authorship of the song, alongside others written by Zuleta that he recorded in the same sessions, but the recordings were not intended to be released commercially, and Buitrago kept them at home. When "La Gota Fría" later became famous, Zuleta had to defend his authorship claim in court against claims by the family of Buitrago, who had died in 1949.

In 1994 a version of "La Gota Fría" by Carlos Vives became an international hit. Following that, the song was recorded by other artists including Gloria Estefan, Julio Iglesias, and Paloma San Basilio. Gabriel García Márquez described it as "a perfect song".
