= Egidio Cuadrado =

Colombian accordionist (1953–2024)

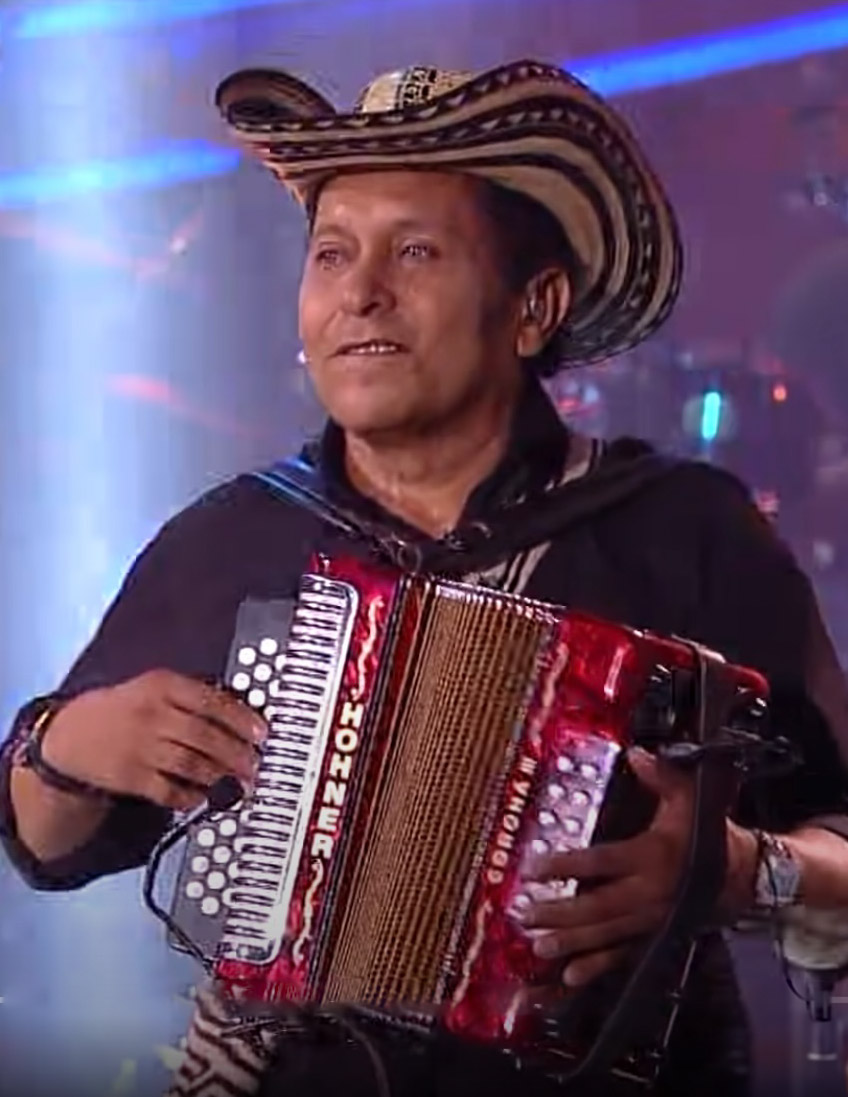
Cuadrado in 2014

Egidio Cuadrado (26 February 1953 – 21 October 2024) was a Colombian vallenato accordionist. He died on 21 October 2024, at the age of 71.
