= Vallenato Legend Festival =

Musical festival in northeastern Colombia

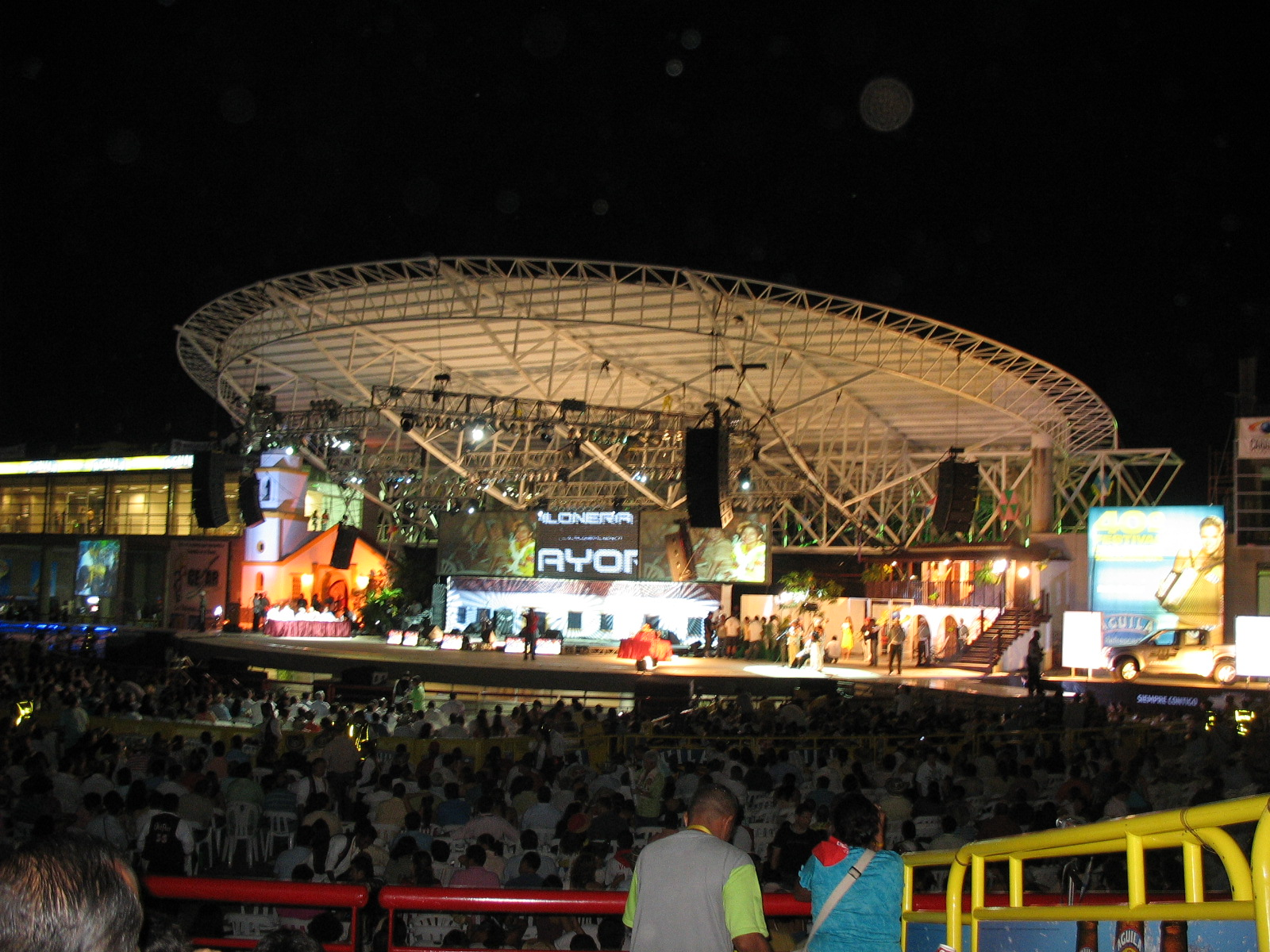
- Vallenato Legend Festival, main venue
- Genre: Vallenato, Folk
- Dates: End of April (usually four days)
- Location: Colombia: Valledupar, Cesar
- Years active: every year since 1968
- Website: www.festivalvallenato.com

The Vallenato Legend Festival (Spanish: Festival de la Leyenda Vallenata) is one of the most important musical festivals in Colombia. The festival features a vallenato music contests for best performer of accordion, caja vallenata and guacharaca, as well as piqueria (battle of lyrics) and best song. It is celebrated every year in April in the city of Valledupar, Department of Cesar.

== Origins ==
The festival was established in 1968 in Valledupar by Alfonso López Michelsen, then the first governor of the newly created Cesar Department, composer Rafael Escalona, journalist and cultural promoter Consuelo Araújo Noguera, and Miriam Pupo. Its founders intended the event to preserve and promote the region's musical, oral and cultural traditions.

The festival developed in connection with Valledupar's established patronal celebrations of Our Lady of the Rosary. Vallenato parrandas, including gatherings known as colitas, formed part of those festivities. The festival's name refers to the local religious tradition known as the "Vallenato Legend".

From its establishment through 1986, the festival was organized by the tourism office of the Cesar Department. The Fundación Festival de la Leyenda Vallenata was established on 26 April 1986 as a private non-profit organization and subsequently became the festival's organizing body.

=== The Vallenato legend ===
Several versions of the story circulate in local oral tradition. In a commonly recounted version, an Indigenous woman known as Francisca was mistreated and had her hair cut, prompting an Indigenous attack on the Spanish settlement. According to the story, the Virgin of the Rosary extinguished a fire at the church with her mantle and later restored to life Spaniards who had died after drinking poisoned water at Sicarare. The religious observances associated with the story predated the modern music festival, which was founded in their context and took its name from the legend.

== The Contests ==
The most important event during the celebration of this festival is the vallenato musical contest. The winners are chosen by a vallenato experienced jury that evaluate the contestants’ prowess in the four main rhythms which are paseo, son, puya and merengue. There are several categories in which the contestants may participate including: "professional accordion player", "amateur accordion player", "young accordion player", "best new vallenato song", and piquerías (in which each competitor's goal is to 'diss' their opponent through clever lyrics).

Besides the annual winners, there is also a special award given to renowned vallenato composers and performers, a statuette known as La Pilonera Mayor, which is given in recognition of the recipient’s dedication to vallenato music. La Pilonera Mayor is the highest honor given to a vallenato musician in Colombia and only six composers have received it until now. This award is given in honoris memoriam of disappeared Consuelo Araújo.

- Judges for competitions are selected by the Board of Directors of the Vallenato Legend Festival Foundation (Fundacion Festival de la Leyenda Vallenata) and must be affiliated members.

=== King of Kings ===
The Rey de Reyes festival editions occur every ten years, since 1987 and only previous winners can participate. The first winner was Colacho Mendoza, followed by Gonzalo "Cocha" Molina, the third King of Kings Hugo Carlos Granados won on May 1, 2007.

== Winners ==
La Pilonera Mayor Award: Emiliano Zuleta Baquero, Rafael Escalona, Leandro Díaz, Calixto Ochoa, Adolfo Pacheco and Tobías Enrique Pumarejo.

No	Year	Professional Accordionist	Amateur Accordionist	Youth Accordionist	Child Accordionist	Composer of New Vallenato Song	Winning song	Piqueria (major / child)
1	1968	Alejo Durán	none	none	none	none	none	none
2	1969	Nicolás Mendoza	Emiliano Zuleta Díaz	none	none	Gustavo Gutiérrez	Rumores de viejas voces	none
3	1970	Calixto Ochoa	Emilio Oviedo	none	Ciro Meza Reales	Freddy Molina	El indio desventurado	none
4	1971	Alberto Pacheco	Carmencito Mendoza	Antolin Arias	Adiel Vega	Santander Duran	Lamento Arhuaco	none
5	1972	Miguel López	Ciro Meza Reales (Semiprofesional: Alberto Rada)	none	Luciano Poveda	Camilo Namén	Recordando mi niñez	none
6	1973	Luis Enrique Martínez	Egidio Cuadrado (Semiprofesional: Álvaro Cabas)	none	Raúl Martínez	Armando Zabaleta	No vuelvo a Patillal	none
7	1974	Alfredo Gutiérrez	Alberto Villa (Semiprofessional José María Argote)	none	Gustavo Maestre	Nicolás Maestre	El Hachero	none
8	1975	Julio de la Ossa	Raúl Martínez (Semiprofesional: Luis Villa)	none	Orangel Maestre	none in 1st place	none in 1st place	none
9	1976	Náfer Durán	Álvaro López (Semiprofesional: José María Ramos)	none	Fernando Dangond	Julio Onate	La Profecía	none
10	1977	José María Ramos	Adiel Vega	none	Navin López	Alonso Fernández	Yo soy Vallenato	none
11	1978	Alfredo Gutiérrez	Carlos Arrieta	none	Jose Alfonso Maestre	Octavio Daza	Río Badillo	none
12	1979	Rafael Salas	Álvaro López	none	Jose Vásquez	Pedro García Díaz	El Poeta Pintor	Andrés Beleno
13	1980	Elberto López	Navín López	none	Hugo Carlos Granados	Tomás Darío Gutiérrez	Voz de accordeones	Luis Manjarrez
14	1981	Raúl Martínez	Álvaro Meza	none	Miguel Avendano	Fernando Dangond	Nacio mi Poesía	Wilman Rodríguez
15	1982	Eliecer Ochoa	Gonzalo "El Cocha" Molina	none	José López	Gustavo Gutiérrez	Paisaje de Sol	Antonio Salas
16	1983	Julio Rojas Buendía	Segundo Vanegas	none	Raúl Vega	Julio Díaz	Yo soy el acordeón	Alcides Manjarrez
17	1984	Orangel Maestre	Carlos Bracho	none	Aider Vega	Juvenal Daza	La Espinita	Alcides Manjarrez
18	1985	Egidio Cuadrado	Omar Geles	none	Gustavo Osorio	Emiliano Zuleta Díaz	Mi Acordeón	José Villero
19	1986	Alfredo Gutiérrez	Hugo Carlos Granados	none	Juan David Herrera	Rafael Manjarrez	Ausencia Sentimental	Ivo Díaz
20	1987	Nicolás Mendoza	Omar Geles	none	No 1st place	Santander Duran	La Canción del Valor	none
21	1988	Alberto Villa	Hildelmaro Bolanos	none	Iván Zuleta	Marciano Martínez	Con el alma en la mano	Juan Oviedo
22	1989	Omar Geles	Juan Carlos Ovalle	none	Harold Rivera	José F. Mejía	Puya Almojabanera	Luis M. Onate
23	1990	Gonzalo "El Cocha" Molina	Juan David Herrera	none	Jaime Bornacelli	José F. Mejía	No hay tierra como mi tierra	Rafael Zuleta
24	1991	Julián Rojas	Álvaro Meza	none	Saúl Soto	Gustavo Calderón	Mementos del ayer	José Bornacelli
25	1992	Álvaro López	Juan José Granados	none	Franklin Vega	Hernando Marín	Valledupar del alma	No 1st place
26	1993	Alberto Rada	Manuel Vega	none	Víctor Beltrán	Ivo Díaz	Dame tu alma	Alcides Manjarrez
27	1994	Julio Rojas Buendía	Iván Zuleta	none	Sergio Luis Rodríguez	Iván Ovalle	Yo vivo enamorado del valle	Guillermo Arzuaga
28	1995	Freddy Sierra	Harold Rivera	none	Sergio Iguarán	Hortensia Lanao	¿Qué hago, Señor?	Andrés Barros
29	1996	Juan David Herrera	Moisés Polo	none	Marlon González	Alfonso Cotes Maya	La cabeza de Pavajeau	Wilman Felizzola
30	1997	Gonzalo "El Cocha" Molina	Hugo Carlos Granados	none	Sergio Luis Rodríguez	Emiliano Zuleta Díaz	Mi pobre valle	No 1st place
31	1998	Saúl Lallemand	Ramón Villa	none	Ángel Torres	Luis Cujía; Ramiro Garrido; Sergio Moya; Luis Ramírez	Yo soy el cantor; Yo soy el son; recuerdos de viejos tiempos; puya del folklor	José Ariza
32	1999	Hugo Carlos Granados	Deivis Rivera	none	Manuel José Martínez	Félix Carrillo; Winston Muegues; Antonia Daza; Deimer Marin	Mi pobre acordeón; Los barrios del valle; El orgullo de nacer; Maestro de maestros	Julio Cárdenas
33	2000	José María Ramos Jr.	Nemer Yesid Tetay	none	Luis José Villa Guete	Santander Duran Escalona	Cantares de vaqueria	José Bornacelli
34	2001	Álvaro Meza Reales	Christian Camilo Peña	none	Yosimar Rodríguez	Winston Muegues	La Estratificación	Julio Salas
35	2002	Navín López Araujo	Marlon González	none	Camilo Carvajal Cuadro	Melquisedec Namen Rapalino	Vestida de gloria	José Félix Ariza
36	2003	Ciro Meza Reales	John Jaider Suárez	Luis Villa Guete	Jairo De la Ossa Otero	Martha Guerra	Un soncito tolimense	Teobaldo Penalosa
37	2004	Harold Rivera	Omar Hernández	Fernando Rangel Molina	Carlos Mario Ramírez	Guillermo Doria Borrero	Raíces de Oro	José Félix Ariza
38	2005	Juan José Granados	Ángel Torres Arroyo	Mauricio de Santis	Camilo Andres Molina	Julio César Daza	Sueno Vallenato	Julio Cárdenas
39	2006	Alberto Jamaica	Rodolfo de la Valle Escorcia	Javier Rogrigo Álvarez	Jesús Ocampo Ospino	Ever Jiménez	El Valle es tu casa	Rubén Ariza
40	2007	Hugo Carlos Granados	Ómar Hernández Brochero	Rodolfo Miguel Molina Meza	Yeimy Arrieta	Santander Duran Escalona	Entre cantores	José Dolores Bornacelly
41	2008	Christian Camilo Peña	Mauricio de Santis Villadiego	Romario Munive Royero	Dyonnel Velásquez Castro	Rafael ‘Uchi’ Escobar	El que te canta	José Félix Ariza
42	2009	Sergio Luis Rodríguez	Guillermo Ortiz Cuesta	Jorge Lucas Dangond Daza	Daniel Guillermo Maestre Alvarado	Willian Klinger	Yo también soy vallenato	Martín Lozano
43	2010	Luis Eduardo Daza Maestre	Carlos Alberto Torres Arroyo	Daniel de Jesús Holguín Ricardo	José Gustavo Gómez Molina	Lázaro Alfonso Cotes Ovalle	La última historia	Rubén Darío Ariza Díaz
44	2011	Almes Granados	Jairo Andrés de la Ossa	Camilo Carvajal Cuadros	José Camilo Mugno Pinzón	Adrián Pablo Villamizar	Ciegos nosotros	William Castrellón
45	2012	Fernando Isaac Rangel Molina	Jaime Luis Campillo Castañeda	Fabio Felipe Villabona	Mélida Andrea Galvis Lafont	Germán Villa Acosta	El Rey del Folclor	José Félix Ariza
46	2013	Wilber Nicolás Mendoza Zuleta	Delay Alay Magdaniel Gómez	Rodrigo José Romero Chamorro	Miguel Ángel Velilla Navarro	Álvaro Olimpo Pérez Vergara	El cuentico chino	Edwin Oved Vásquez Lambraño
47	2014	Gustavo Osorio Picón	Camilo Andrés Molina Luna	José Camilo Mugno	Sebastián Sepúlveda	Enrique Ariza Celis	Con el alma entre las manos	Andrés Felipe Barros
48	2015	Mauricio de Santis Villadiego	Jesús Ocampo	Daniel Maestre Alvarado	Rubén Lanao	Margarita Doria Carrascal	Vallenatos del alma	Julio Cárdenas
49	2016	Jaime Dangond Daza	Pedro José Rueda Pinilla	Alberto Ovalle	Sergio Moreno	Everardo Armenta Alonso	Vallenato joven	Fredy de Ávila
50	2017	Álvaro Lopez Carillo	Daniel de Jesús Holguín Ricardo	José Juan Camilo Guerra Mendoza	José Alejandro Aldana Vergara	Ivo Luis Díaz Ramos	El rey de los cajeros	José Félix Ariza Vega
51	2018	Julián Ricardo Mojica Galvis	Ronal Torres	Yerson Robles	Jerónimo Villazon	Leonardo Salcedo Campuzano	Mi lenguaje musical	Julio Andres Gil Barros (Child); Santander Bornacelli (Professional)
52	2019	Alfonso ‘Ponchito’ Monsalvo Baute	José Juan Camilo Guerra	Carlos Alberto Narváez Fontalvo	José Liberato Villazon	none	none	none
53	2020	Manuel Vega Vásquez	Augusto Carlos ‘Tuto’ López Barrios	none	none	Luis Ángel Rodríguez Bolaño	Me enseñaste	Iván René Becerra Narváez
54	2021	José Ricardo Villafañe Álvarez	Daniel Eduardo Paternina Garay	José Liberato Villazón Ibáñez	Santiago Alberto Díez Arévalo	Jesús Emilio Carrascal Cotes	Las vainas de Oñate	Major: Yostimar Prada Valcárcel; Child: Samuel David López Mendoza
55	2022	Almes Guillermo Granados Melo (Rey de Reyes)	Edgardo Alonso Bolaño Gnecco	Jerónimo Andrés Villazón Murillo	Santiago David Oñate Quintero	Gustavo Calderón Guerra (Rey de Reyes)	La parranda vallenata	Major: Julio Cárdenas Guerrero (Rey de Reyes); Child: Alex Alex Barros González
56	2023	Javier Antonio Matta Correa	Jesús David Valderrama Mora	Kevin Leonardo Noguera Reales	Armando Luis Espitia Benavides	Juan Pablo Marín Álvarez	Si nace una rosa	Major: Julio Erasmo Gutiérrez Vega; Child: Dahiana Andrea García Carvajal
57	2024	Jaime Luis Castañeda Campillo	Jerónimo Andrés Villazón Murillo	José David Caraballo Aguilar	Fernando José Salcedo Matute	Unaldo José Rocha Calderón	Canta Valle, Canta	Major: Ángel María González Valdemar; Child: Juan Pablo Gómez Garzón
58	2025	Iván Zuleta Barros	Gregorio Javier Gutiérrez Tocora	Santiago David Oñate Quintero	John Emiliano Olmos Prieto	Michael Alexander García Riascos	Vallenato y Carnaval	Major: Julio Andrés Gil Barros; Child: Julio César Hoyos Olmos
59	2026	José Juan Camilo Guerra Mendoza	Romario Andrés Morón Bertel	Samuel Arzuaga Robles	Jerónimo Álvarez Arango	Fabián Leonardo Dangond Rosado	La huella del viento	Major: Jaider David Daza Bolaño; Child: Sheryl Sofía Arcos Higuita

=== Women's accordion competitions ===
The festival introduced the Acordeonera Mayor and Acordeonera Menor competitions in 2019. The Acordeonera Menor competition was not held in 2020, when the children's competitions were not held because of the COVID-19 pandemic.

Winners of the women's accordion competitions
Edition	Year	Acordeonera Mayor	Acordeonera Menor
52	2019	Loraine de Jesús Lara Mercado	Alexandra Maciel Gómez de la Ossa
53	2020	Yeimi de Jesús Arrieta Ramos	Not held
54	2021	Nataly Yishell Patiño Amarís	Isabel Sofía Picón Mora
55	2022	María Sara Vega Barros	Sara Valentina Rhenals Escobar
56	2023	Wendy Paola Corzo Carmona	Sofía Pinzón Donado
57	2024	Sara Marcela Arango Pérez	Laura Sofía Benítez Cabezas
58	2025	Heinis Yulieth Gulfo Palma	María José Arias Pérez
59	2026	Sara Valentina Rhenals Escobar	Laura Patricia Moreno Ortega

== Dances and other events ==
Piloneras Parade: This traditional dance was recovered from extinction in 1994 thanks to the Vallenato Legend Festival Foundation effort, and was added to the festival's programming as the opening show. This dance is traditional of the magdalena river reveres. Traditionally Dancers paraded on the streets using a giant wooden mortar and pestle, (usually used to squash corn and produce corn flour), the men and women danced around the 'corn smashing' in a courteous and flirting way, dancing in front of friend's houses to receive liquor in exchange. But the festival kept the dance and turned it into a competition among groups of Piloneros and whoever exposes the best show becomes the winner. There are three categories: children (under 14), youth (14–18), and adults .

Other events:

- Record labels present their best artists and orchestras throughout the Festival, usually before, during recess of events and after competition.
- Many Nightclubs and Event Centers offer alternative parties with vallenato musical groups and other orchestras.
- Certain families affiliated to this Festival often throw open "parrandas" or parties to special guests and friends.
- The festival also sponsors cultural activities related to the festival; debates, symposia, panel discussions, traditional storytelling, paintings expositions, artesanias and book expositions, among other cultural events.
- Valledupar and surrounding towns have cockfight arenas, that have tournaments during the Festival dates. This sport considered brutal for some represent a major attraction for locals and some tourists, but are not sponsored by the Vallenato Legend Festival. This sport is a strong traditional hobby for some locals (passion for some) mixed with vallenato "parrandas" and much gambling.

== See also ==
- List of music festivals in Colombia
- List of folk festivals
