= Cradle of Accordions Festival =

- Genre: Folk music, vallenato
- Dates: September
- Locations: Villanueva, Department of La Guajira, Colombia
- Founders: Israel Romero
- Website: cunadeacordeones.com

The Cradle of Accordions Festival (Spanish: Festival Cuna de Acordeones) is a festival in the Colombian northern town of Villanueva, Department of La Guajira in the month of September. The Cradle of Accordions Festival is celebrated on the same day as Saint Thomas and many vallenato musicians from the Department of Cesar and La Guajira gather to participate in an accordionist contest. The religious event is celebrated with a mass, a procession and fireworks. In 2006 the Senate of Colombia by Law 1052 of this same year declared the Cradle of Accordions Festival as a Cultural and Artistic Patrimony of Colombia. The president of the event is Binomio de Oro de America accordionist and owner Israel Romero.

== See also ==
- List of folk festivals
- List of festivals in La Guajira
- Vallenato Legend Festival
