= Luis Enrique Martínez (musician) =

Colombian musician and songwriter

- Also known as: El Pollo Vallenato
- Born: Luis Enrique Martínez Argote; 24 February 1922–3; El Hatico, Fonseca, Colombia
- Died: 25 March 1995 (aged 72–73) Santa Marta, Colombia
- Genre: vallenato
- Years active: 1947–1991
- Spouse: Rosalbina Serrano
- Children: 6

Luis Enrique Martínez Argote (1922 or 1923–1995), also known as El Pollo Vallenato, was a Colombian musician and songwriter. Martínez was one of the first to record accordion music in Colombia, alongside Abel Antonio Villa. He won the accordion competition of the Festival de la Leyenda Vallenata in 1973, and was described by Julio Oñate Martínez as "one of the greatest accordion players and performers in the history of vallenato music."

== Biography ==
Luis Enrique Martínez was born on 24 February in either 1922 or 1923 in El Hatico, a town in Fonseca, Colombia. His father was Santander Martínez, an accordionist of some renown, who is mentioned by name in the song "El Cantor de Fonseca" by Carlos Huertas. Martínez was a self-taught accordionist, and was influenced by the styles of Diego Sarmiento, Pacho Rada, Chico Bolaños, and his father.

In the mid-1940s, Martínez moved to El Copey in the Colombian department of Cesar, where he married Rosalbina Serrano. Martínez had two children with Serrano and four with other women. His career as a musician began in 1947, when inspired by the successes of Guillermo Buitrago and Abel Antonio Villa (his brother-in-law), he began travelling and performing in the coastal towns of La Guajira. Shortly afterwards, he founded the Conjunto Lírico Vallenato, also known as the Conjunto Típico Vallenato, with whom he released several LPs.

Martínez' first record was a 1949 single on Discos Fuentes called "La Lotería", a son that he wrote, with the merengue "Secreto de los Choferes" on the B-side. His first commercial hit was a 1949 single release of "Adiós mi Maye", a paseo written by Armando Zabaleta. On the B-side of "Adiós mi Maye" was "La Cumbia Cienaguera", a joint composition (Note: This joint authorship was decided by a Colombian court in 1963.) by Andrés Paz Barros (melody), Esteban Montaña (lyrics), and Martínez (arrangement); Martínez' 1951 recording of the song was nationally successful.

In 1968, Martínez attended the inaugural Festival de la Leyenda Vallenata in Valledupar, where he came third in the accordionist competition, behind Alejo Durán and Ovidio Granados in first and second place respectively. In 1969, Discos Fuentes released the split album Los Campeones el Festival Vallenato! between Martínez and Durán, to capitalise on their success. In 1971, Martínez competed again, and his loss to Alberto Pacheco was controversial among the attendees. Martínez competed for a third and final time in 1973, when he won the competition and was crowned Rey del Vallenato. He maintained that his poor relationship with festival organiser and jury member Rafael Escalona prevented him from winning the first two attempts.

Martínez' final album Herencia Paternal was released in 1991. He died of complications due to diabetes in Santa Marta on 25 March 1995. In 2003, his body was exhumed and reburied in a mausoleum in El Hatico.

== Recordings and compositions ==
Martínez often recorded the compositions of other songwriters, including Tobías Enrique Pumarejo, Esteban Montaña, Adriano Salas, Lino J. Anaya, Rafael Valencia, and Camilo Narnén. He also wrote more than 120 songs himself, with notable examples being "La Tijera", "El Hombre Divertido", "Jardín de Fundación", "El Parrandero", "El Mago del Copey", "No Me Hagas Sufrir", "El Gallo Jabao", "La Cordobesa" and "Mi Despedida". Martínez was a coauthor of the cumbia "La Cumbia Cienaguera" alongside Andrés Paz Barros and Esteban Montaña.

== Albums ==
- Los Campeones el Festival Vallenato!, split album with Alejo Durán (1969, Discos Fuentes)
- Herencia Paternal (1991, Sony Music)
