= Villanueva, La Guajira =

Villanueva
- Municipality and town
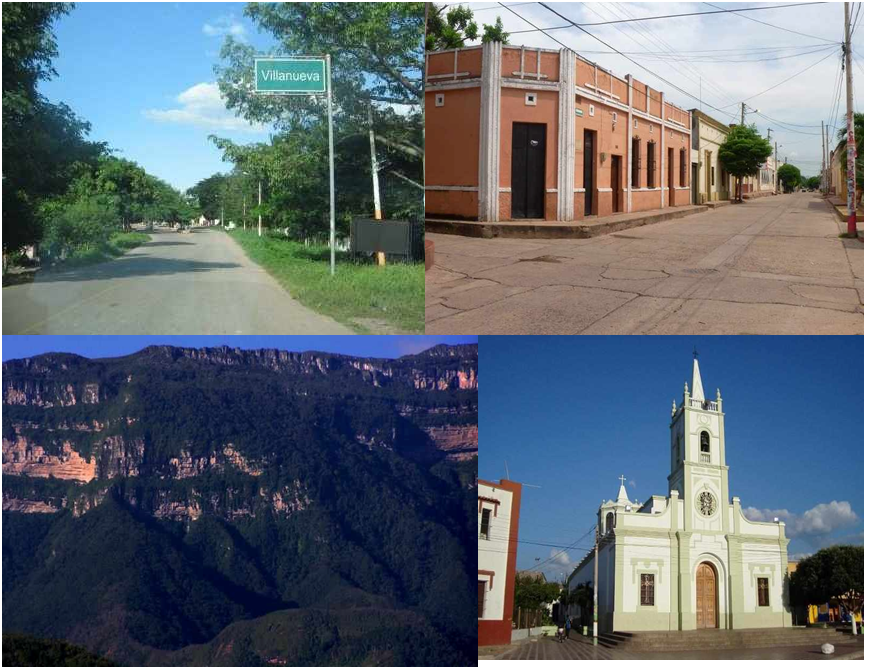

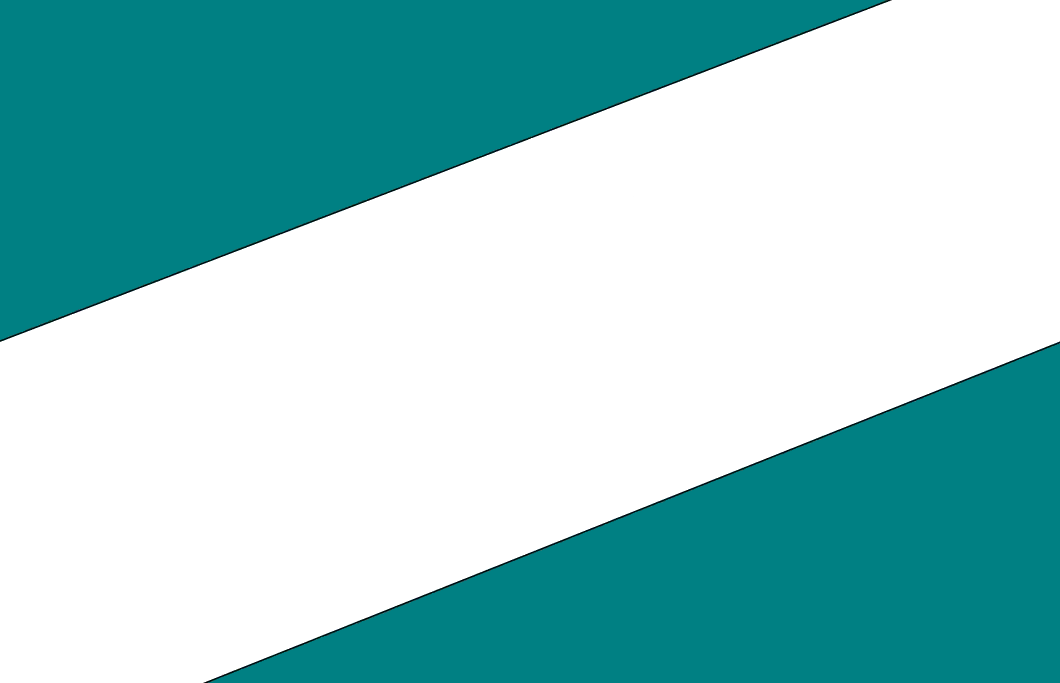
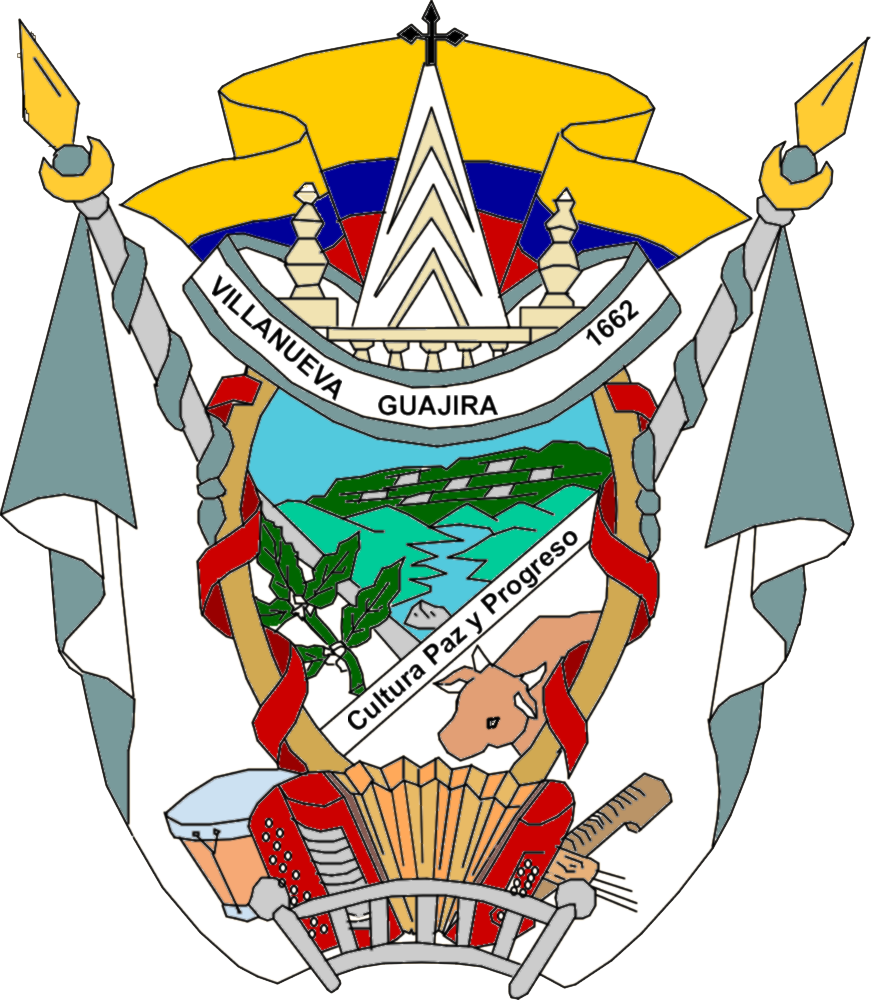
- Flag Coat of arms

- Location of the municipality and town of Villanueva in La Guajira Department.

- Location in Colombia
- Coordinates: 10°36′32″N 72°59′3″W
- Country: Colombia
- Region: Caribbean
- Department: La Guajira
- Foundation: January 16, 1662 by Roque de Alba

Government
  - Mayor: Luis Erasmo Dangond (Colombian Conservative Party)

Area
  - Municipality and town: 260.1 km^{2} (100.4 sq mi)
  - Urban: 5.41 km^{2} (2.09 sq mi)
- Elevation: 250 m (820 ft)

Population (2018 census)
  - Municipality and town: 28,346
  - Density: 109.0/km^{2} (282.3/sq mi)
  - Urban: 26,488
  - Urban density: 4,900/km^{2} (12,700/sq mi)
- Time zone: UTC-5
- Climate: Aw
- Website: villanueva-guajira.gov.co

Villanueva is a town and municipality located in the northern Department of La Guajira, Colombia. Villanueva is known in Colombia for being the cradle of many vallenato singers and composers. The economy of the town relies heavily on agriculture and farming.

== Geography ==
The municipality of Villanueva is located in the southern region of the Department of La Guajira within the valley of the Cesar River, between the Sierra Nevada de Santa Marta mountains and the Serranía del Perijá which Villanueva borders. The municipality is crossed by the Villanueva River which flows into the Cesar River. The municipality seat is located by the Cerro Pintao ("Painted Hill") which also covers the municipalities of San Juan del Cesar, El Molino and Urumita and in the Department of Cesar the municipalities of Manaure, La Paz, San Diego and Codazzi covering an area of 25,000 ha and with an altitude ranging from 1600 to 3,688 m (Páramo) giving birth to some 13 rivers.

Villanueva limits to the north with the municipalities of El Molilno, with the Bolivarian Republic of Venezuela to the east; to the south with the municipalities of Urumita and San Juan del Cesar; and to the west with the Department of Cesar covering a total area of 265 km² and at altitude of 250 m over sea level. More than half of the total area of the municipality is part of the Serranía del Perijá while the rest is flat, within the valley.

=== Climate ===
Climate in the municipality of Villanueva is determined by altitude and precipitation. The municipality has an average temperature of 28 °C throughout the year with two rainy seasons and two dry seasons.

== History ==
Prior to the arrival of the Spanish explorers in the early 16th Century the area of what is present-day Villanueva was inhabited by a Chimila tribe; the Itotos, then led by cacique Canopan and their settlement was called Timiriguaco ("great village"). The village was allegedly founded by Don Roque de Alba in 1662.

=== Colombian armed conflict ===
==== Villanueva massacre ====
massacred occurred on December 8, 1998 in the neighborhood known as El Cafetal and some 11 people were assassinated by members of the United Self-Defense Forces of Colombia (AUC) by orders of Carlos Castaño. Alias "Jorge 40", commander of the Northern Bloc of the AUC, part of the paramilitary structure later admitted to participating in the massacre by order of Castaño, in which the operation was commanded by alias "Daniel" and a unit of some 80 paramilitaries.

Victims were dragged out of their homes while a paramilitary commander called out their names on a list. Alias "Jorge 40" confessed that the massacre had taken place because there had been reports that the neighborhood was an enclave of the Luciano Ariza Front of the National Liberation Army (ELN) guerrilla. He also confessed the motives of selecting December 8 as the date of the massacre, a traditional local Roman Catholic celebration known as the "Dia de las Velitas", and in which people use fireworks to celebrate. Fireworks would conceal the sound of the shots.

== Economy ==
The economy of Villanueva is based primarily on agriculture and commercial trade between the other Southern Guajira municipalities and the city of Valledupar in the Department of Cesar. of the 26,500 Ha, 7,300 Ha are used for plantations, 8,000 for cattle raising, 10,146 Ha were unused and 454 covered urban areas.

In the lower part of the Serranía del Perijá there are limestone deposits which are exploited in artisan manner.

== Culture ==
Villanueva celebrates in the month of September the Cradle of Accordions Festival, a vallenato musical contest as well as a religious celebration in honor of Saint Thomas.
