= Andrés Landero =

Colombian musician (1931–2000)

- Born: February 4, 1932
- Origin: San Jacinto, Bolívar, Colombia
- Died: March 1, 2000 (aged 68)
- Genres: Cumbia, vallenato
- Instruments: Accordion
- Years active: 1962–2000

Andrés Gregorio Guerra Landero (February 4, 1932–March 1, 2000) was a Colombian musician and composer. He was known as "The King of Cumbia".

== Life ==
Andrés Landero was born in San Jacinto, Bolívar, on February 4, 1932. His father was the gaitero Isaías Guerra and his mother Rosalba Landero. As a boy, he visited the mountains and learned the sounds of nature. In 1950, he began performing in his region. He bought his first accordion from his friend Francisco Rada, and formed his first musical group with Antonio Yaspes, Juan Gregorio Ortega and Vicente Fernández. He was invited by Delia Zapata Olivella to be part of her dance group that was touring Europe. He arranged and recorded "La Hamaca Grande", composed by Adolfo Pacheco.

Landero best-known songs include "La Pava Congona", "Bailando Cumbia", "Perdí las Abarcas", "Las Miradas de Magaly", "Flamenco", and "La Muerte de Eduardo Lora". In an interview for the documentary series Landero la Tierra que Canta, Celso Piña praised Landero's simple, vivid lyricism.

With his own group, Landero won several music festival competitions, including the Cumbia Festival in El Banco, Magdalena, the Sabanero Festival in Sincelejo, and the Bolivarian Accordion Festival in Arjona, Bolívar. He participated five times in the Festival de la Leyenda Vallenata, achieving two second places and two third places. Landero made tours of Venezuela, Panama, the Dominican Republic and Mexico. In Colombia, he was declared "King of Cumbia."

Landero fathered 24 children. He died of a heart attack on March 1, 2000, in Cartagena after being hospitalized in the same city.

== Discography ==
- 1962 Candelazos Curro "En Acordeón" Vol. 9 (Phillips)
- 1964 Piel Morena (Phillips)
- 1965 Fiel Caricia (Discos Fuentes)
- 1966 Cumbia en la India (Discos Fuentes)
- 1969 Mujer Querida (Discos Fuentes)
- 1969 El Engaño
- 1970 Voy a la Fiesta (Discos Fuentes)
- 1971 Serenata Vallenata (Discos Fuentes)
- 1972 La Fiebre (Discos Fuentes)
- 1973 Andrés Landero y su Conjunto (Tropical)
- 1973 El Solterón (Discos Fuentes)
- 1975 El Desahuciado (Tropical)
- 1976 Cuerdas de Gallo (Tropical)
- 1976 El Tigre del Acordeón (Tropical)
- 1977 Los Hamaqueros (Caliente)
- 1977 Con las Mejores Cumbias
- 1977 Solo Cumbias (INS)
- 1979 Bailando Cumbia (Discos Fuentes)
- 1979 En Acción (Discos Fuentes)
- 1979 Cumbia Artesana (Sonido Alva)
- 1981 El Hijo del Pueblo (Discos Fuentes)
- 1983 Angélica María (Discos Fuentes)
- 1986 Cumbia Colombiana (Codiscos)
- 1995 El Rey de la Cumbia (Discos Fuentes)
- 2004 Historia Musical de Andres Landero (Discos Fuentes)
- 2008 El Clarín de la Montaña (Producciones Damar)
- 2010 Una Leyenda (Discos Fuentes)
- 2016 Yo Amanecí (Vampi Soul)
