= Los Hermanos Zuleta =

Los Hermanos Zuleta (Spanish for The Zuleta Brothers) are a renowned vallenato musical group that won the Latin Grammy Awards of 2006. Their name refers to the brothers Emiliano Alcides Zuleta and Tomás Alfonso Zuleta, who founded the group and are sons of Emiliano Zuleta, writer of the song "La Gota Fría".
