= Guacharaca =

Musical percussion instrument

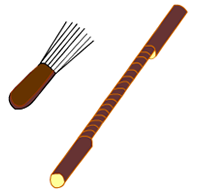
Guacharaca

Guacharaca [ɡwatʃaɾaˈka] is a percussion instrument found in Colombia. It is a rasp named after a bird (ortalis guttata) whose call it is said to imitate.

It is usually made out of the cane-like trunk of a small palm tree. The guacharaca itself consists of a tube with ridges carved into its outer surface with part of its interior hollowed out, giving it the appearance of a tiny, notched canoe. It is played with a fork composed of hard wire fixed into a wooden handle. The guacharaquero (guacharaca player) scrapes the fork along the instrument's surface to create its characteristic scratching sound. A typical guacharaca is about as thick as a broomstick and as long as a violin. The guacharaca was invented by native American Indians from the Tairona culture in the region of la Sierra Nevada de Santa Marta, Colombia as an instrument to simulate the guacharaca (or Ortalis ruficauda) bird's singing. During the mid 20th century it was adopted by vallenato and cumbia musicians and today it is most often associated with these musical styles.Guacharacas provide a steady rhythmic backbone for all varieties of vallenato and cumbia.

Playing the guacharaca requires rhythm, speed and coordination. The instrument is held in the non-dominant hand and rests on the shoulder, while the other hand moves the wire fork up and down to create a pattern. Thus, depending on the music the movement will change which can increase the difficulty in playing.
