= Caja vallenata =

Drum similar to a tambora

playing the Caja

The caja, a Colombian drum similar to a tambora, is one of the three main or traditional instruments of Vallenato music. Caja, the slang word adopted to nickname this drum, means "box" in Spanish. There is also a Caribbean drum called caja, used in the music of Cuba.

== Origins ==
African slaves brought by the Spanish colonizers came along with tamboras to what is now northeastern Colombia probably derived from the Congolese makuta drum. Tamboras were first adopted by the Cumbia musical genre and later introduced to Vallenato music. With the advancement of technology new make and models developed the traditional drum into an instrument similar in make to a conga.

== Parts ==
Traditional: Elliptic cylinder made out of wood and a cow skin (drumhead) stretched over the top wider opening and tighten with rustic ropes, approximately 30 cm (12 in) of height.

Modern Version: similar in made to a congas drum but shorter in height (approximately 30 cm or 12 in). Made out of the same wood base but no ropes are used to stretch and hold the skin, instead a metal frame bolted to the wooden base is used to hold the animal skin or X-ray photo (radiograph) made skin.

== Playing the caja ==
Vallenato has four different rhythms to which the caja adapts to mark the base key: Rubbing and striking with hand palms.

- Son
- Paseo
- Merengue
- Puya
