= Rafael Escalona =

Colombian songwriter (1927–2009

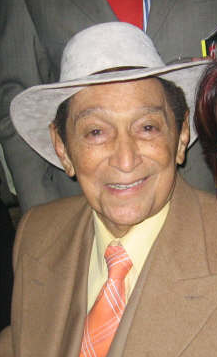

Background information
- Born: Rafael Calixto Escalona Martínez; 27 May 1927; Patillal, Colombia
- Died: 13 May 2009 (aged 81) Bogotá, Colombia
- Genre: Vallenato
- Occupations: Songwriter, diplomat

Rafael Calixto Escalona Martínez (Note: In this Spanish name, the first or paternal surname is Escalona and the second or maternal family name is Martínez.) (27 May 1927 – 13 May 2009) was a Colombian songwriter. He is considered one of the best vallenato songwriters of all time, though he could not play an instrument and rarely sang. He was a co-founder of the Vallenato Legend Festival, along with Consuelo Araújo and Alfonso López Michelsen.

Escalona was a long-time friend of Gabriel García Márquez, who mentions him in One Hundred Years of Solitude, and described him as "the intellectual of vallenato."

== Early life and education ==
Escalona was born on 27 May 1927 in Patillal, in the Colombian department of Cesar (but at that time in Magdalena). He was the seventh child of colonel Manuel Clemente Escalona Labarces, a veteran of the Thousand Days' War, and Margarita Martínez Celedón. Unusually for early vallenato figures, his family were wealthy.

Escalona attended school at the Colegio Nacional Loperena in Valledupar, and there aged 15 he wrote his first song "El Profe Castañeda" about a teacher Heriberto Castañeda. Escalona left the school in 1943 after completing the third year of his baccalaureate, and started attending the Liceo Celedón in Santa Marta. After repeating his fifth year three times, Escalona left the Liceo Celedón without graduating in 1948, allegedly because he was expelled for being caught kissing a girl in a classroom. In 1991, he received an honorary baccalaureate degree from the Colegio Nacional Loperena.

== Music career ==
=== Songwriting ===
El Espectador wrote that Escalona was "considered the greatest composer of vallenato music of all time and one of the most representative figures of Colombian folklore." Although well-known for his songwriting, he never learned to play an instrument and rarely sang. Gabriel García Márquez cited Escalona as an inspiration for his novel One Hundred Years of Solitude, and the two of them were instrumental in the creation of the Vallenato Legend Festival. Márquez once told Escalona that One Hundred Years of Solitude is "nothing more than a 350-page vallenato." He also described Escalona as "the intellectual of vallenato" (Spanish: el intelectual del vallenato).

Escalona's songs became popular in Bogotá in the 1960s, and helped drive the increasing popularity of vallenato in Colombia in the 1970s. He often wrote about real events and people in his life, and about the history of Cesar. He also wrote many songs for women, including but not limited to his wife Marina. Several times, beginning in 1988, he was president of SAYCO, the Colombian copyright collective.

Escalona wrote his first song "El Profe Castañeda" in February 1943. His notable compositions include "La Casa en el Aire", "El Testamento", "Elegía a Jaime Molina", "La Custodia de Badillo", "La Vieja Sara", "El Copete", "El Pirata", "Honda Herida", "El Mejoral", "El Arco Iris", "El Almirante Padilla", "El Chevrolito", "La Molinera", "La Brasilera", "La Patillalera", "La Golondrina", "La Historia", and "La Creciente del Cesar".

=== The Vallenato Legend Festival ===
The Vallenato Legend Festival was founded by Escalona, Alfonso López Michelsen, and Consuelo Araújo Noguera in 1968 as a way of promoting the musical culture of Cesar, which had been split from Magdalena the year before. The festival was modelled on a vallenato festival that Escalona had organised with Gabriel García Márquez in Aracataca in 1966. Escalona was on the panel of judges for several editions of the festival.

=== Telenovela ===
In 1992 Caracol TV produced a telenovela called Escalona based on Rafael Escalona's life, starring Carlos Vives. The programme brought both Escalona and Vives significant recognition within Colombia and abroad. Vives recorded two soundtrack albums for the programme, Escalona: un canto a la vida and Escalona: Vol. 2.

== Political career ==
Escalona was made public relations chief of the newly created department of Cesar in 1968 by governor Alfonso López Michelsen. When López Michelsen became president of Colombia, he appointed Escalona ambassador to Panama.

== Personal life and death ==
Escalona married Marina Arzuaga Mejía in 1951, and they later separated. On his death, his son Rafael Jr claimed that he had at least 23 children.

Escalona died on 13 May 2009 in Bogotá. He had been interned for almost two weeks in the Santa Fe Clinic in Bogotá and had been on a ventilator and unconscious earlier that day. When he died, Colombian ex-President Ernesto Samper Pizano was on the way to visit him.

== See also ==
- Guillermo Buitrago, another important figure in early vallenato music
