= Vallenato =

Colombian folk music genre

- Caja, guacharaca, and accordion, the basic instruments in vallenato
- Stylistic origins: Spanish music; Amerindian cultural traditions; African Music
- Cultural origins: Early 1900s, Colombia's Caribbean region
- Typical instruments: Accordion; caja; guacharaca; bass; guitar

Subgenres
- Traditional vallenato; romantic vallenato; commercial vallenato; new wave of vallenato

Fusion genres
- Charanga-vallenata; vallerengue; vallenato-pop; vallenato-rock; vallenatón

Other topics
- Vallenato Legend Festival; Cradle of Accordions Festival

Traditional vallenato music of the Greater Magdalena region
- UNESCO Intangible Cultural Heritage
- Country: Colombia
- Reference: 01095
- Region: Latin America and the Caribbean

Inscription history
- Inscription: 2015 (10th session)
- List: Need of Urgent Safeguarding

Vallenato (Latin American Spanish pronunciation: [baʝeˈnato]) is a popular folk music genre from Colombia. It primarily comes from its Caribbean region. Vallenato literally means "born in the valley". The valley influencing this name is located between the Sierra Nevada de Santa Marta and the Serranía de Perijá in north-east Colombia. The name also applies to the people from the city where this genre originated: Valledupar (from the place named Valle de Upar – "Valley of Upar"). In 2006, vallenato and cumbia were added as a category in the Latin Grammy Awards. Colombia's traditional vallenato music is Intangible Cultural Heritage in Need of Urgent Safeguarding, according to UNESCO.

== Origins ==
This form of music originated from farmers who, keeping a tradition of Spanish minstrels (juglares in Spanish), used to travel through the region with their cattle in search of pastures or to sell them in cattle fairs. Because they traveled from town to town and the region lacked rapid communications, these farmers served as bearers of news for families living in other towns or villages. Their only form of entertainment during these trips was singing and playing guitars or indigenous gaita flutes, known as kuisis in the Kogi language, and their form of transmitting their news was by singing their messages.

The first form of vallenato was played with gaita flutes, guacharaca, and caja, and later adopted other instruments like guitars. These troubadors were later influenced by Europe's instruments: piano and accordion. Impressed by the sound of the accordion, troubadors probably later obtained accordions from Aruba and Curaçao. Vallenato was considered music of the lower class and farmers, but gradually started penetrating through every social group during the mid-20th century.

Don Clemente Quintero – a prominent member from the region's elite – was a lover of this music, usually accompanied by liquor, was a form of entertainment for this almost isolated region. He then decided to start a parranda (party) inside the very strict Valledupar Social Club with friends. This triggered an acceptance for the music and it became a regular feature at parties, carnivals and reunions, not for dancing, but for listening to these juglares stories.

Alfonso López Michelsen, a prominent Colombian politician, showed interest in the region as his ancestors and wife were born there. While a Senator, he pushed for the creation of the Department of Cesar and became, in 1966, its first governor. Once in office and together with writer and reporter Consuelo Araújo Noguera and vallenato composer Rafael Escalona, they created the Vallenato Legend Festival.

== Instruments ==
Its three traditional instruments are:

- the caja vallenata: a small drum held between the knees and played with bare hands. It was used by the African slaves brought by the Europeans. Similar to a tambora drum.
- the guacharaca: a wooden, ribbed stick similar to a sugar cane, accompanied by a fork that when rubbed together emits a scraping sound. It's about 18 inches (45 centimeters) long and 1 inch (3 centimeters) in diameter. It was used by the aborigines to imitate the song of the guacharaca or guacharaco (one of the species of chachalaca), a bird from the region, to hunt and perform dancing rites.
- the accordion: three-line button, German-origin accordion. It has three reeds per note and comes in different keys: ADG, GCF, and BbEbAb ("5 Letras"). Accordions in Colombia and Panama sometimes have custom made keys especially made for vallenato and cumbia.

== The four rhythms ==
Vallenato consists of four beats or "airs" that are differentiated through their rhythmic structure and the melody chord structure the accordionist gives it. These are son, paseo, merengue, and puya. The son and the paseo have a 2/4 time and the merengue and the puya a 6/8 time.

- Son is played with heavy accentuation and cadence stressed on the low notes of the accordion on its left-hand side. It is normally mournful and slow.
- Paseo is thought to be an offshoot of the son. Its speed can vary and today is the most widely recorded air.
- Puya's main difference from the merengue is the length of its lyrics. In the last 40 years, accordion players have begun to play it faster, and each of the three instruments used in vallenato has a solo. It is considered the oldest of the four "airs", with roots in an ancient Indian dance of the Sierra Nevada de Santa Marta.
- Merengue is often confused with a Dominican genre with the same name, probably brought by related African tribal groups. It has a more narrative style and was often used to play décimas, a 10-line format with internal rhymes brought by the Spanish in the 16th century.

== Piqueria ==
The piqueria vallenata is a type of typical musical showdown Colombian Caribbean folklore and Vallenato. As in the contrapunteo Joropo burrowing, or trova paisa within the music, litigants demonstrate their improvisational skills in building verses that challenge their opponent. This type of musical confrontation arose as a result of chance encounters between vallenatos minstrels who roamed the northern part of Colombia brightening binges and to demonstrate their talent on the accordion and the art of improvisation faced with songs and rhymes. One of the most important meetings of the Piqueria was between Emiliano Zuleta and Lorenzo Morales, both vallenato accordionists. From this meeting came the popular song "La Gota Fría" ("The Cold Drop" in English), played in its most popular version by Colombian singer Carlos Vives.

== Vallenato festivals ==
Many vallenato festivals are held annually in Colombia, such as:

- The Vallenato Legend Festival: Every year by the end of April, in the city of Valledupar, the Festival de la Leyenda Vallenata (Vallenato Legend Festival) is celebrated. During the festival a contest takes place in which the best vallenato interpreters fight for the title of Rey Vallenato (Vallenato accordion King), "verseadores", new song composers, "guacharaqueros" and "cajeros" are also awarded within three categories; professional, aficionado and infant. The festival also includes record industry's orchestras shows.
- Accordions' Cradle Festival: (Festival cuna de accordeones) This festival is celebrated every year since 1979, in Valledupar's neighboring town of Villanueva, in La Guajira. The Festival is similar to the Vallenato Legend Festival format, but also includes a category for the elderly accordion players over sixty years old.
- Other Vallenato festivals
  - The Vallenato Festival in Bogotá, Colombia

== Vallenato composers, singers and juglares ==
Thanks to the Vallenato Legend Festival, this musical genre became known through the region including regions of Venezuela, and when a popular telenovela, "Escalona", based on the life of Vallenato composer, Rafael Escalona was aired on national television (with vallenato superstar Carlos Vives as Escalona), vallenato became widely known in Colombia and internationally. Some renowned traditional vallenato performers are Guillermo Buitrago, Alejo Duran, Enrique Díaz, Emiliano Zuleta, Luis Enrique Martínez, Abel Antonio Villa and Lorenzo Morales. Other important characters such as Tobías Enrique Pumarejo and Rafael Escalona never played any instrument, but were important writers of very well known songs across Latin America. Other well-known Colombian musicians who sing vallenatos are Rafael Orozco Maestre, Miguel Morales, Diomedes Díaz, Jorge Oñate, Ivan Villazon, Adanies Díaz, Nicolas "Colacho" Mendoza (accordion player and composer), Juan Humberto "Juancho" Rois (accordion player and composer), Omar Geles (accordion player and composer), Israel Romero, Peter Manjarrés, Silvestre Dangond, Los Gigantes Del Vallenato, Galy Galiano, and Lisandro Meza among others.

The current ambassador of the genre is Carlos Vives, who has progressively helped vallenato gain popularity worldwide by combining traditional vallenato music with pop/rock music, subgenre that has come to be known as "vallenato-pop".

== Vallenato musical orchestras and groups ==
The traditional vallenato developed into a more orchestra type of musical group. Throughout the years, some groups started adding instruments and a group chorus to support the main singer, popularly and sarcastically known as "ay omberos". With these changes. Some of the instruments added or used by some orchestras were: the bass guitar, the congas drums, a Timbal set, drum kit, maracas, guache, electric piano, Spanish guitars, tambourine, cowbell, electric guitar, Saxophone, piano accordion, violins, among others. These groups also started fusioning local genres to the vallenato, usually with cumbia, porro sabanero, gaitas (group of gaita flute interpreters), merecumbe and joropo. Some groups seeking a wider audience started mixing vallenato with other international genres, like salsa, merengue, rock, classical music, reggae, reggaeton, ranchera, techno and house music. Some of these mixes did not become very popular because of their experimental sounds.

=== La Nueva Ola (The New Wave) ===
La Nueva Ola refers to the new generation of vallenato groups and orchestras that have created a distinctive sound for themselves while keeping some of the essences of their predecessors. Kaleth Morales is considered the leading artist of this young wave of vallenato musical groups, even after his death following a car accident on August 24, 2005. The leader is now Silvestre Dangond, who won five awards in Premios Nuestra Tierra in 2009. Other relevant artists are Silvestre Dangond, Peter Manjarrés and Martín Elías.

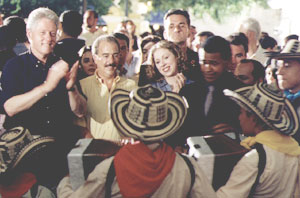
US President Bill Clinton and daughter Chelsea during a visit to Cartagena, Colombia where they were greeted by a Vallenato children group.

== See also ==
- Music of Colombia
- Vallenato Legend Festival
- UNESCO Intangible Cultural Heritage Lists
- Latin Grammy Award for Best Cumbia/Vallenato Album
- Carlos Vives
