= Latin Grammy Award for Best Cumbia/Vallenato Album =

Music award category

- Awarded for: Quality albums of the cumbia or vallenato genre
- Country: United States
- Presented by: The Latin Recording Academy
- First award: 2006
- Currently held by: Silvestre Dangond and Juancho De la Espriella for El Último Baile (2025)
- Website: latingrammy.com

The Latin Grammy Award for Best Cumbia/Vallenato Album is an honor presented annually at the Latin Grammy Awards, a ceremony that recognizes excellence and creates a wider awareness of cultural diversity and contributions of Latin recording artists in the United States and internationally. The award goes to solo artists, duos, or groups for releasing vocal or instrumental albums containing at least 51% of new recordings.

To date, the award has only been presented to artists originating from Colombia. It was first awarded to Los Hermanos Zuleta for the album Cien Días De Bohemia in 2006.

Jorge Celedón holds the record of most wins in the category with five awards out of seven nominations. The ensemble Binomio de Oro de América holds the record for most nominations without a win with four.

== Winners and nominees ==
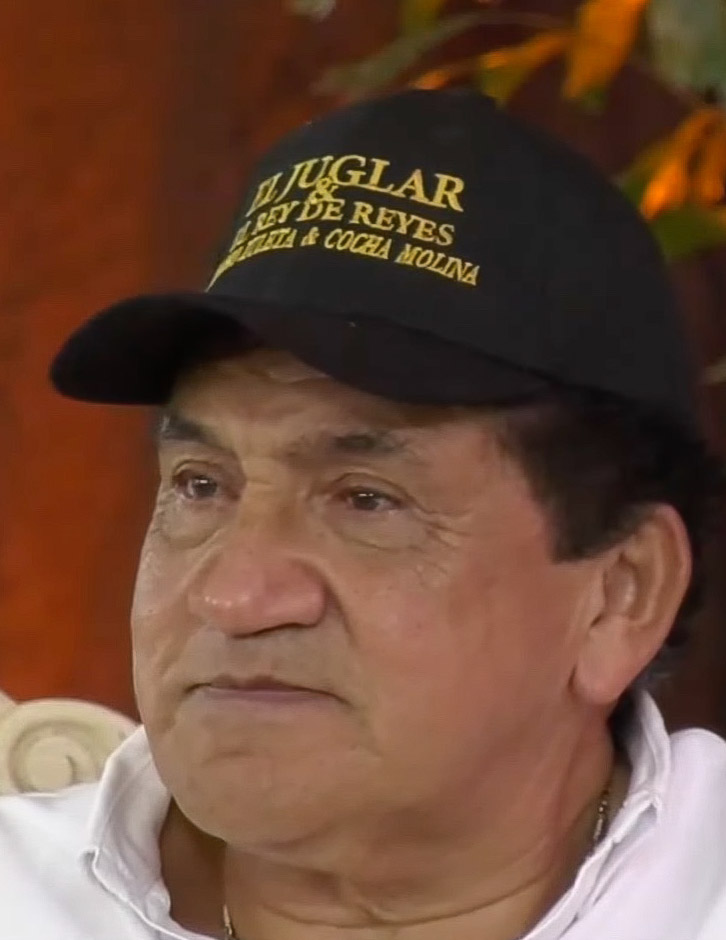
Singers Poncho Zuleta (pictured) and Emiliano Zuleta were the first winners of the award in 2006, credited as Los Hermanos Zuleta.

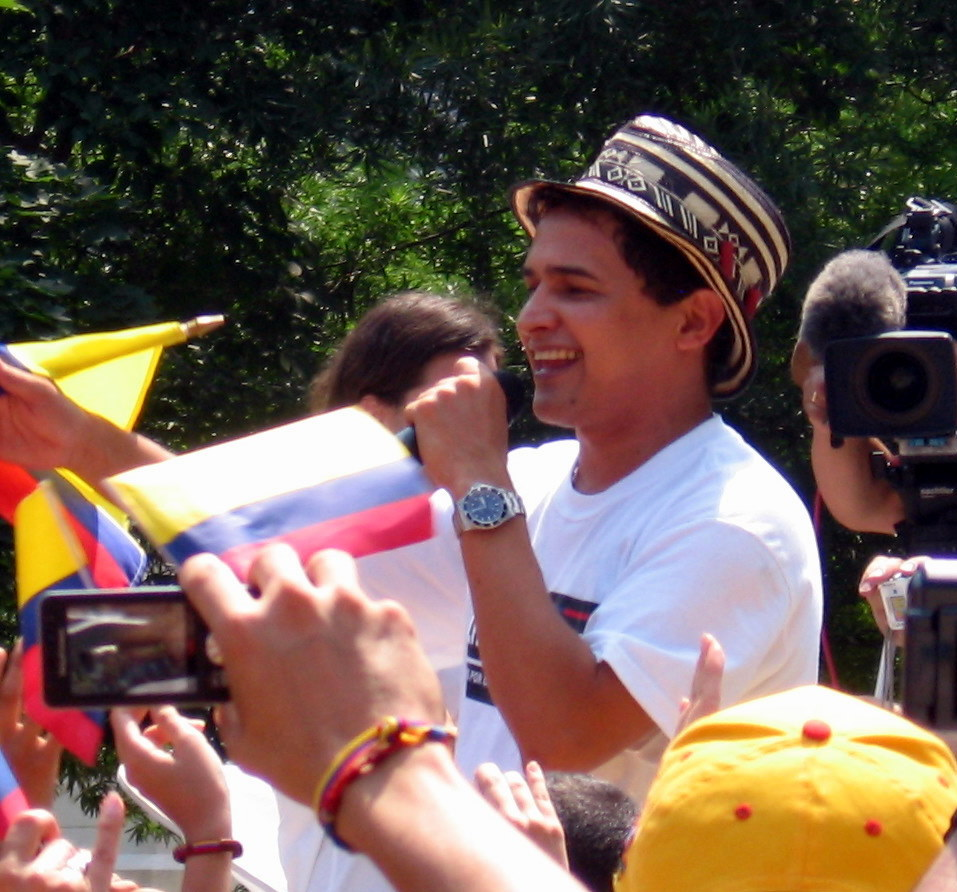
Colombian musician and singer Jorge Celedón holds the record of most wins in the category with five wins.

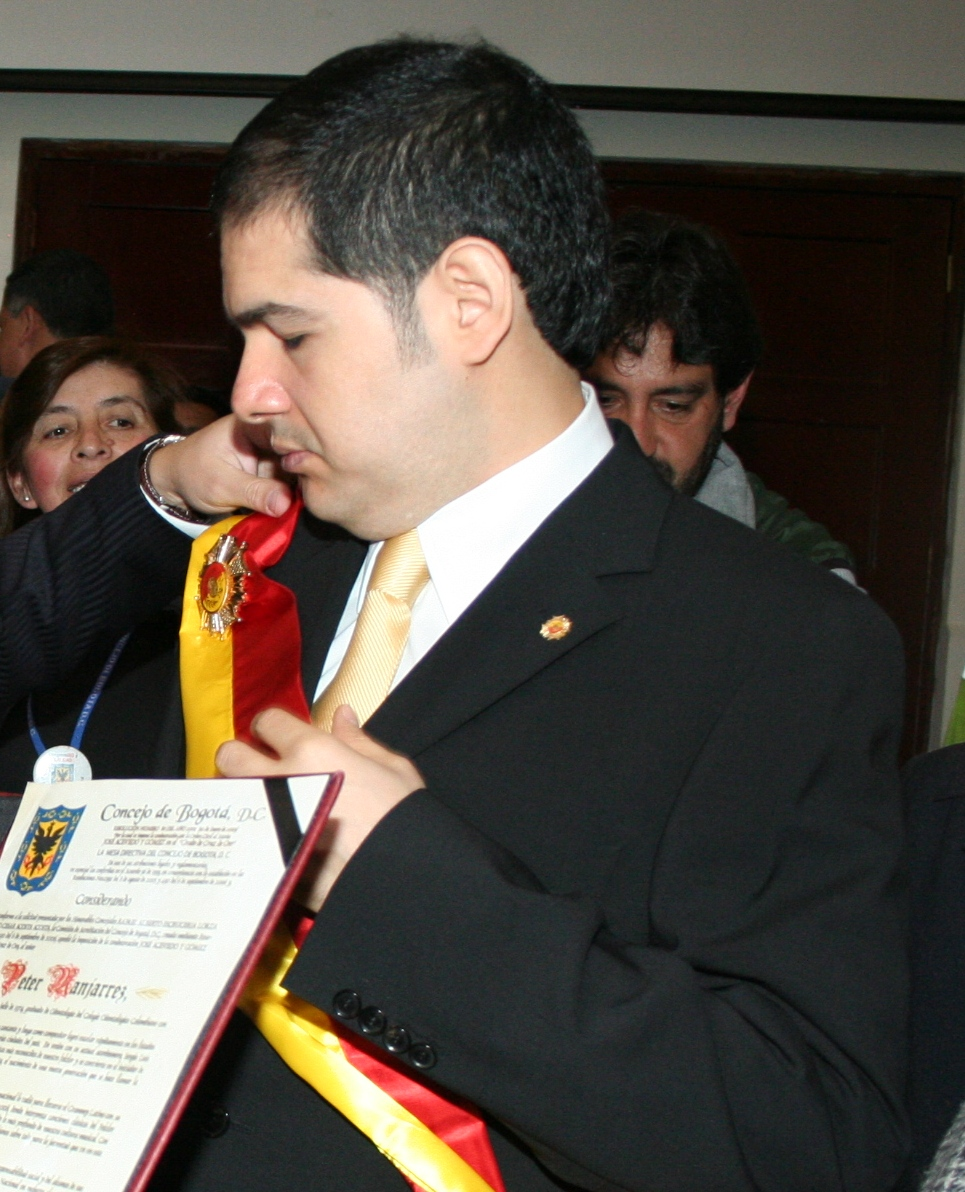
Two-time winner Peter Manjarrés.

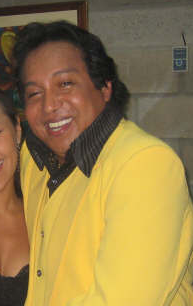
Singer Diomedes Díaz won the award in 2020 with Álvaro López.

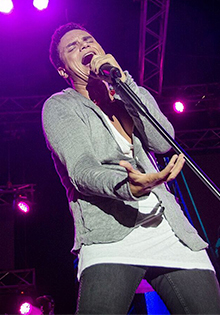
Four-time winner Silvestre Dangond.

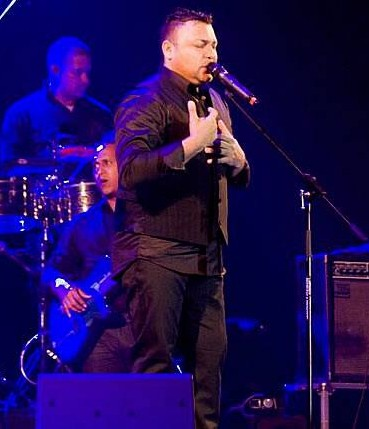
Singer Jean Carlos Centeno received the award alongside Ronal Urbina in 2022.

Year^{[I]}	Performing artist(s)	Work	Nominees	Ref.
2006	Los Hermanos Zuleta	Cien Días De Bohemia	Alfa 8 – Yo Bailo Cumbia; Binomio de Oro de América – Grafiti de Amor; Jorge Celedón & Jimmy Zambrano – Grandes Exitos En Vivo; Iván Ovalle – Veinte Años Después...	
2007	Jorge Celedón & Jimmy Zambrano	Son...Para El Mundo	Checo Acosta – Checazos De Carnaval 3; Binomio de Oro de América – Impredecible; Alfredo Gutiérrez – El Más Grande Con Los Grandes; Peter Manjarrés & Sergio Luis Rodríguez – El Papá De Los Amores	
2008	Peter Manjarrés, Emiliano Zuleta & Sergio Luis	Sólo Clásicos	Chicas de Canela – Chicas de Canela; El Combo de las Estrellas – Somos La Esencia; Gusi & Beto – La Mandarina; Emilianito Zuleta & Toba Zuleta – Palabra de Honor	
2009	Peter Manjarrés & Sergio Luis Rodríguez	El Caballero "Del Vallenato"	Silvestre Dangond & Juancho de la Espriella – El Original: La Revolución; Diomedes Díaz – Celebremos Juntos; Grupo Kvrass – Ombe Y Como No!!; Iván Villazón & José María "Chema" Ramos – El Vallenato Mayor	
2010	Diomedes Diaz & Álvaro López	Listo Pa' la foto	Binomio de Oro de América – Vuelve y pica...El Pollo; Omar Geles & Alex Manga – Prueba Superada; Jorge Oñate – Te Dedico Mis Triunfos; Poncho Zuleta & Cocha Molina – El Nobel del Amor	
2011	Juan Carlos Coronel	Tesoros	Silvestre Dangond & Juancho De La Espriella – Cantinero; Binomio de Oro de América – Corazón de Miel; Peter Manjarrés & Sergio Luis Rodríguez – Tu Número Uno; Felipe Peláez – De Otras Manera; Iván Villazón & Iván Zuleta – Dando Lidia	
2012	Juan Piña	Le canta a San Jacinto	Omar Geles – Histórico - A dúo con los grandes; Diomedes Díaz & Álvaro López – Con Mucho Gusto Caray; Silvestre Dangond & Juancho De La Espriella – No Me Compares Con Nadie; Jorge Celedón & Jimmy Zambrano – Lo Que Tú Necesitas	
2013	Felipe Peláez & Manuel Julián	Diferente	Daniel Calderón y Los Gigantes – El Show Máximo Nivel; Silvestre Dangond – La 9a Batalla; Kvrass – Irreverente; Jorge Oñate – El Chaco de La Película	
2014	Jorge Celedón	Celedón Sin Fronteras 1	Dubán Bayona & Jimmy Zambrano – Métete En El Viaje; Diomedes Díaz & Álvaro López – La Vida del Artista; Alejandro Palacio – La Voz Del Ídolo; Juan Piña – Cántandole A Mi Valle	
2015	Jorge Celedón & Gustavo García	Sencillamente	Américo – Por Siempre; Silvestre Dangond & Lucas Dangond – Sigo Invicto; Gusi – Al Son de Mi Corazón; Iván Villazón & Saúl Lallemand – El Camino de Mi Existencia	
2016	Fonseca	Homenaje (A La Música de Diomedes Díaz)	El Gran Martín Elías & Rolando Ochoa – Imparambles; Kuisitambó – Desde el Fondo; Felipe Peláez & Manuel Julían – Vestirte de Amor; Various Artists; José Gaviria & Fernando Tobón (album producers) – Mujeres Por Colombia - Vallenato Volúmen 2	
2017	Jorge Celedón & Sergio Luis Rodríguez	Ni Un Paso Atrás	Silvestre Dangond – Gente Valiente; El Gran Martín Elías & Rolando Ochoa – Sin Límites; Juventino Ojito & Su Son Mocaná – Cumbia Del Río Magdalena; Jorge Oñate & Álvaro López – Patrimonio Cultural	
2018	Silvestre Dangond	Esto Es Vida	Alberto Barros – Tributo a la Cumbia Colombiana 4; Diana Burco – Diana Burco; Jean Carlos Centeno & Ronal Urbina – De Parranda; Juan Piña – La Elegancia de la Música	
2019	Puerto Candelaria & Juancho Valencia	Yo Me Llamo Cumbia	Checo Acosta - Checo Acosta 30 (En Vivo); Diego Daza - Esto Que Dice; Juan Piña - Para Mis Maestros Con Respeto; Various Artists; José Gaviria & Fernando Tobón (album producers) - Raíces	
2020	Jorge Celedón & Sergio Luis Rodríguez	Sigo Cantando Al Amor (Deluxe)	Karen Lizarazo - Voz de Mujer; Binomio de Oro de América - Por El Mundo Entero; Kvrass - Dale Play; Los Cumbia Stars - Los Cumbia Stars (Vol. 2)	
2021	Silvestre Dangond	Las Locuras Mías	Diego Daza & Carlos Rueda – Pa' Que se Esmigajen los Parlantes; Los Ángeles Azules – De Buenos Aires para el Mundo; Felipe Peláez – Esencia; Osmar Pérez & Geño Gamez – Moche de Serenata	
2022	Jean Carlos Centeno & Ronal Urbina	Feliz Aniversario	Checo Acosta – Clásicos de Mi Cumbia; La Santa Cecilia – Quiero Verte Feliz; Felipe Peláez – El de Siempre; Zona 8 R & Rolando Ochoa – Yo Soy Colombia	
2023	Carlos Vives	Escalona Nunca Se Había Grabado Así	Silvestre Dangond – Leandro Díaz Special Edition; Ana del Castillo – El Favor de Dios; Los Ángeles Azules – Cumbia del Corazón; Gregorio Uribe – Hombre Absurdo	
2024	Silvestre Dangond	'Ta Malo	Omar Geles – De la Uno a la 1000 (Primera Temporada); Los Ángeles Azules – Se Agradece; Osmar Pérez & Geño Gamez – Vallenatos Pa Enamorar; Puerto Candelaria – La Sociedad de la Cumbia (Big Band Live)	
2025	Silvestre Dangond & Juancho De la Espriella	El Último Baile	Checo Acosta – Son 30; Karen Lizarazo – De Amor Nadie Se Muere; Los Cumbia Stars – Baila Kolombia; Peter Manjarrés & Luis José Villa – La Jerarquía	

^{^[I]} Each year is linked to the article about the Latin Grammy Awards held that year.

== See also ==
- Latin Grammy Award for Best Tropical Song
