= Ivo Díaz (singer) =

Colombian singer and songwriter

- Born: Ivo Luis Díaz Ramos; 15 May 1964 (age 62); San Diego, Colombia
- Genre: Vallenato
- Years active: 1983–present

Ivo Luis Díaz Ramos (Note: In this Spanish name, the first or paternal surname is Díaz and the second or maternal family name is Ramos.) (born 1964) is a Colombian vallenato singer and songwriter. He won the unpublished song of the Vallenato Legend Festival in 1993 and 2017, and has recorded albums with several accordionists including Colacho Mendoza and Chema Ramos.

== Life and career ==
Ivo Luis Díaz Ramos was born on 15 May 1964 in San Diego, in the Colombian department of Cesar. He is the third of six children of vallenato composer Leandro Díaz. When Díaz was a child, his father would host vallenato musicans and songwriters, and in this way he met Rafael Escalona, Emiliano Zuleta, Lorenzo Morales, Poncho Cotes, and Abel Antonio Villa. Díaz wrote his first song at one of these parties, at the age of 12.

Díaz released his debut album Mil Caricias, a collaboration with accordionist Rafael Salas, in 1983. He spent a year playing with Calixto Ochoa y los Papaupas, and then began a recording partnership with Colacho Mendoza, which lasted 13 years and produced seven albums. Díaz has recorded with several other accordionists, including Chiche Martínez, Alberto Villa, Chema Ramos, and both Hugo Carlos Granados and Almes Granados. Díaz also performed with his father throughout his life.

== The Vallenato Legend Festival ==
Díaz has won three competitions at the Vallenato Legend Festival:

- The piquería competition in 1986.
- The unpublished song competition in 1993, with "Dame tu alma".
- The King of Kings unpublished song competition in 2017, with the merengue "El rey de los cajeros", dedicated to cajero Pablo López, whose brother Álvaro López won the professional accordionist competition that year. Sergio Moya Molina came second, and Adrián Villamizar came third.

Díaz was also awarded "best voice" at the 1999 festival, and in total has been the singer of the winning song of the unpublished song competition six times.
