= Leandro Díaz (composer) =

- Born: February 20, 1928; Barrancas, La Guajira, Colombia
- Died: June 22, 2013 (aged 85) Valledupar, Cesar, Colombia
- Genres: Vallenato, Latin
- Instruments: Singing
- Years active: 1935–2013

Leandro José Díaz Duarte (February 20, 1928 – June 22, 2013) was a Colombian vallenato music composer. He is mostly known for his ability to compose very descriptive and narrative vallenato songs despite his blindness. His songs have been recorded by many Colombian musicians including Carlos Vives, Diomedes Díaz, Jorge Oñate, Iván Villazón, among others.

During the 38th version of the Vallenato Legend Festival, Diaz was proclaimed "King for Life of the Vallenato Legend Festival" along with Rafael Escalona, Emiliano Zuleta Baquero, Calixto Ochoa, Adolfo Pacheco and Tobías Enrique Pumarejo.

== Early years ==
Díaz was born in a farm named "La Casa de Alto Pino" in the locality known as Lagunita de la Sierra then corregimiento of Hatonuevo in the Commissary of La Guajira which in 1928 pertained to the municipality of Barrancas.

Díaz was born blind but that was not an impediment for him to develop a sense of the world he could not see. His parents took him to the Virgin of El Carmen festivities every year, vacation time in which his cousins visited him and sang to him for fun. He composed his first song at the age of 17 years and named it "La Loba de Ceniza".

On October 4, 1948, Díaz decided to move to Hatonuevo where he participated in numerous parties with friends and which he was always asked to sing. He met local musician Chico Bolaño and established a friendship. Bolaño died shortly, death that inspired Díaz to compose the song "Mañana".

== Life in Tocaimo ==
Díaz began to travel the region as a singer and established for a while in village of Tocaimo, located in the Department of Cesar, between the municipalities of Codazzi and San Diego. while living in Tocaimo, Díaz composed the song "Los Tocaimeros", in which he mentioned every single family name in town. He also composed two of his most renowned songs "Matilde Lina" and the "Diosa Coronada" whose intro inspired the Colombian Nobel laureate in Literature Gabriel García Márquez and appeared in the beginning of the novel Love in the Time of Cholera.

He also composed during time the songs "La Primavera" and "La Ford Modelo" among others. Another hit song, recorded by vallenato singer Jorge Oñate, was "A mi no me Consuela Nadie". Diaz met vallenato accordionist Pedro Julio Castro, a native of San Juan del Cesar and traveled the region for gigs.

== Family ==
Díaz then met Elena Clementina Ramos, with whom he ended up having eight children, including singer Ivo Díaz. In 1993 Ivo composed the song "Dame tu Alma" to honor his father. The song won at the Vallenato Legend Festival as best song. He is the father of three children.

== See also ==
- Vallenato Legend Festival
- Carlos Vives
- Jorge Oñate
- Rafael Escalona
