= Codiscos =

Colombian record label

- Founded: 1950
- Founder: Alfredo Díez Montoya
- Genre: Latin, Tropical
- Country of origin: Colombia, South America
- Location: Medellín, Colombia
- Official website: Official website

Codiscos (which is short for Compañía Colombiana de Discos, meaning "Colombian Record Company") is a record label headquartered in Medellín, Colombia. It was founded in 1950 by Alfredo Díez Montoya with the name Zeida Ltd, which is today the name of its popular label dedicated to tropical music. Along with Discos Fuentes, it is one of the oldest and largest record labels of Colombia.

== History ==
In 1958, it became an operational recording studio, with the aim of not only distributing, but also recording and encouraging the talents of Colombian authors, composers, arrangers, and performers. Currently, the company has three studios.

Codiscos was in licensing agreements with U.S. Sonotone Records and Balboa Records that have since been discontinued.

On 1 August 2005, it opened a branch, called "Codiscos Corp." in Miami, Florida.

== Artists ==
Codiscos was the label of Juanes when he was part of the group Ekhymosis, when they signed their first record deal.

Codiscos has been the record label for the following artists, among others:

- Alfredo Rolando Ortiz
- Diomedes Díaz
- Kraken
- Jairo Varela and his band Grupo Niche
- Alfredo Gutiérrez (Latin Grammy Nominee)
- Rafael Orozco Maestre and his group Binomio de Oro de América
- Alci Acosta
- Juan Piña
- Albita Rodríguez
- Peter Manjarres (2x Latin Grammy recipient)
- Maelo Ruiz
- Pasabordo
- Zetty
- Artista Rosario
- Mr. Black
- Nicky Jam (Billboard latin Award nominee)
- Monica Giraldo (Latin Grammy Nominee)
- Richie Ray & Bobby Cruz (Latin Grammy nominee)
- Ismael Miranda

The label has garnered 31 Latin Grammy Award nominations, 3 Latin Grammy's, 2 Billboard recognitions, and 2 Billboard Latin Music nominations.

- Gustavo Quintero
- Grupo Bemtú
- Grupo Galé
- Los Diablitos

== See also ==
- Polen Records
