= Ovidio Granados =

Colombian accordionist and songwriter (1941–2026)

- Also known as: El viejo Villo
- Born: Ovidio Enrique Granados Melo; October 1941; Valledupar, Colombia
- Died: 5 June 2026 (aged 84) Valledupar, Colombia
- Genre: Vallenato
- Occupations: Accordionist; songwriter
- Instrument: Accordion
- Spouse: Nimia Córdoba

Ovidio Enrique Granados Melo (Note: In this Spanish name, the first or paternal surname is Granados and the second or maternal family name is Melo.) (October 1941 – 5 June 2026) was a Colombian vallenato accordionist and songwriter. He came second in the accordionist competition of the first Vallenato Legend Festival in 1968, and was considered the best accordion technician in Colombia.

== Life and career ==
=== Early life ===
Ovidio Enrique Granados Melo (Note: Granados' maternal surname has also been reported as being "Durán".) was born in October 1941 in the Mariangola neighbourhood of Valledupar, in the Colombian department of Cesar (but at that time still in Magdalena). He was taught to play accordion by his grandfather Juanchito Granados, and given his first accordion by his uncle.

=== Music career ===
Granados was accordionist in the conjunto Los Playoneros del Cesar from 1959, alongside Rafael Mojica (caja), Eliécer Fragozo (guacharaca) and Luciano Gullo Fragozo (vocals). In 1968 he competed in the accordionist competition of the first Vallenato Legend Festival, coming second behind Alejo Durán. He competed again in 1975 and 1983, but did not win.

He had a successful business repairing accordions, which he learned to do as a child by watching Ismael Rudas. He is considered one of the best accordion technicians in Colombia. He has accompanied Diomedes Díaz as accordionist on several recordings, including on a successful version of Calixto Ochoa's song "Diana" in 1982. Granados' notable compositions include the paseo "El Pobrecito" and the merengue "El Vicio".

== Personal life and death ==
Granados' mother was Isabel Melo Durán, whose own mother Camila Durán was the cousin of Náfer and Alejo Durán. His father was Juan Granados Ochoa, an accordionist, whose mother Ángela Ochoa was the aunt of Calixto Ochoa, and whose father Juancito Granados was a vallenato juglar. Granados has ten siblings, among whom are Almes Granados, who was vallenato king at the Vallenato Legend Festival in 2011, and Adelmo Granados, who plays caja and has accompanied Silvestre Dangond.

He was married to Nimia Córdoba, with whom he had ten children. His sons Juan José Granados and Hugo Carlos Granados were vallenato kings in 2005 and 2007, respectively. His son Eudes Granados was also an accordion technician, and died in the same 1994 plane crash that killed Juancho Rois.

Granados died in Valledupar on 5 June 2026, at the age of 84.
