= Rafael Orozco, el ídolo =

- Genre: Telenovela
- Screenplay by: Andrés Felipe Martínez; Arleth Castillo; Rafael Rojas
- Story by: Diva Jessurum
- Directed by: Unai Amuchastegui; Andrés Marroquín
- Creative directors: Gŭarnizo and Lizaralde
- Starring: Alejandro Palacio; Taliana Vargas; Maritza Rodríguez; Mario Espitia; Ángela Vergara; Alberto Pujol; Myriam de Lourdes; Rafael Camerano; Gabriela Ávila; Martín Armenta; Camila Zárate; Peter Cárdenas; María Teresa Carrasco; Freddy Flórez; Rafael Santos; Víctor Navarro; Aco Pérez; Gabriel Andrés Villa
- Theme music composer: Rafael Orozco Maestre
- Opening theme: "Solo para ti" performed by Alejandro Palacio
- Country of origin: Colombia
- Original language: Spanish
- No. of seasons: 1
- No. of episodes: 90

Production
- Executive producer: Asier Aguilar Amuchastegui
- Editor: Franko
- Camera setup: Multi-camera

Original release
- Network: Caracol Televisión
- Release: November 20, 2012 – April 1, 2013

Related
- Pablo Escobar, The Drug Lord; La hipocondríaca

Rafael Orozco, el ídolo is a Colombian biographical telenovela produced by Asier Aguilar Amuchastegui for Caracol Televisión. Based on the life of the Colombian singer of vallenato Rafael Orozco Maestre. It stars Alejandro Palacio as the titular character. The series follows the life of Rafael Orozco Maestre in his romantic moments and why he was killed.

== Plot ==
"Rafa", as they called it in confidence, was destined to be of those people who never forget. From a very young age he had a special talent for vallenata music, but also possessed a charm that made him irresistible to women. But Clara Cabello was different from all the others, so, from the first day she met her, she was spellbound with her smile, her words and her gaze. And although many were going to stand in the way to conquer his heart, he knew that love would make his songs immortal, so he had no doubt that she would be forever at his side on his way to success.

But on the night of June 11, 1992, her romantic voice was silenced forever. Nine bullets were needed to end the life of that man who thrilled the world through his unforgettable songs. Why did they kill him? Who killed him? This is the question that everyone is asked.

== Cast ==
=== Main ===
- Alejandro Palacio as Rafael Orozco Maestre
- Taliana Vargas as Clara Cabello de Orozco
- Maritza Rodríguez as Martha Mónica Camargo
- Mario Espitia as Ernesto "Teto" Tello
- Ángela Vergara as Mariela de Cabello
- Alberto Pujol as Jacinto Cabello
- Myriam de Lourdes as Cristina Maestre de Orozco
- Rafael Camerano as Rafael Orozco Fernández
- Gabriela Ávila as Betty Cabello
- Martín Armenta as Jeremías Orozco
- Camila Zárate as Luisa
- Peter Cárdenas as Misael Orozco
- María Teresa Carrasco as Myriam Cabello
- Freddy Flórez as Hernán Murgas
- Cristina García as Ninfa
- Rafael Ricardo as Compai Chipuco
- Víctor Navarro as Luciano Poveda
- Éibar Gutiérrez as Egidio Oviedo
- Rafael Santos as Dionisio Maestre
- Aco Pérez as Virgilio Barrera
- Mauricio Castillo as Bassist
- Carlos Andrés Villa as Israel Romero

=== Recurring ===
- Alejandro López as Alfredo Benedetti
- Mauricio Cújar as Chepe Pinto
- Luis Fernando Bohórquez as Álvaro Arango
- Laura Londoño as Silvia Duque
- Jairo Camargo as Dr. Duque
- Juan Pablo Posada as Alberto Santamaría
- Liliana Escobar as La profe Doni
- José Sedek as Roberto Mancini
- Felipe Galofre as Gomoso
- Carlos Vergara Montiel as Fabio Poveda Márquez
- Xilena Aycardi as Luz Marina
- Rita Bendeck as Carlota
- Heriberto Sandoval as Jorge Barón
- Daniela Tapia as Chila
- Luis Fernando Múnera as Alfonso López
- Liesel Potdevin as La Generala
- Katherine Escobar as Coraima Ruiz
- George Slebi as Sergio
- Orlando Valenzuela as Quique Sierra
- Adriana Bottina as La copetona
- Luigi Aycardi as Julio Martelo
- Paolo Ragone as Reginaldo
- Andrea Ribelles as Olga
- Hada Vanessa as Rita
