= Jean Carlos Centeno =

Colombian musician (born 1976)

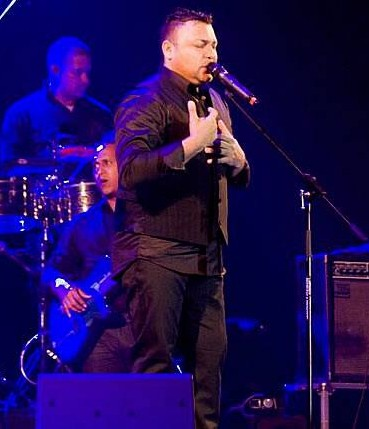
- Centeno at a concert in 2015

Background information
- Also known as: Jean Carlos Centeno; Jean K Casi loco (Near-Mad)
- Born: December 13, 1976 (age 49); Cabimas, Zulia, Venezuela
- Origin: Villanueva, La Guajira, Colombia
- Genres: Vallenato, bolero, salsa
- Occupations: Singer, songwriter
- Instrument: Vocals (tenor)
- Years active: 1993–Present
- Label: Sony Music
- Formerly of: Binomio de Oro de América
- Spouses: Paola de la Peña (m. 1998; div. 2006); María José Gutiérrez (m. 2019)
- Award: Full list
- Website: www.jeancarloscenteno.com/
- Citizenship: Colombia; Venezuela
- Children: 4

Jean Carlos Jiménez Centeno (born Evel Antonio Jiménez Centeno, December 13, 1976), known professionally as Jean Carlos Centeno, is a Colombian (Note: Although he was born in Venezuela, Centeno did not confirm this until he was 20 years old. However, the artist has always identified more with Colombian nationality, showing a strong commitment and refusing to renounce it: Cuando yo confirmo que nací allá (en Venezuela), empecé a buscar los papeles a ver si era cierto, y efectivamente sí era cierto, pero yo no voy a renunciar a mi nacionalidad colombiana, no lo iba a hacer, no lo he hecho, y si pudiera decir mil veces que me siento orgulloso de haber creído y haber nacido aquí en Colombia pues lo diría porque yo creía haber nacido aquí y fue aquí donde me crié. Considero que soy colombiano, aunque para muchos no lo sea. When I confirmed that I was born there (in Venezuela), I started looking for the documents to see if it was true, and indeed, it was true. But I am not going to renounce my Colombian nationality, I wasn’t going to do it, I haven’t done it, and if I could say a thousand times that I’m proud to have believed and been born here in Colombia, I would say it because I truly believed I was born here, and it was here where I was raised. I consider myself Colombian, even if many don’t see me that way. — Jean Carlos Centeno, for the program Yo, José Gabriel. Published by Semana.) vallenato singer and songwriter born in Venezuela. During his childhood, he emigrated to Colombia, where he obtained Colombian citizenship through naturalization (Note: Centeno holds Venezuelan citizenship by jus soli, as he was born in Cabimas. He also holds Colombian citizenship, through which he grew both personally and professionally, by naturalization.) and began his professional artistic career.

Centeno rose to prominence as a singer and songwriter during his tenure with the vallenato group Binomio de Oro de América, which he joined in 1993 and remained with until 2005. That year, he left the group to pursue a solo career alongside accordionist Juan Fernando “Morre” Romero. In 2006, Centeno and Romero released their first independent album, Ave Libre. Throughout his career, Centeno has released 17 studio albums (11 with Binomio de Oro and six as a solo artist). In 2022, he won the Latin Grammy Award for Best Cumbia/Vallenato Song/Album and had previously received a nomination in 2018.

== Early years ==
Centeno's parents are Evel Antonio Jiménez Centeno and Nidia María Centeno Gómez whom as a child, at only 3 months old of age, took him to Villanueva, La Guajira, in Colombia and left him with María Elena Jiménez Balcázar due to financial hardships. Centeno's grandfather Reynaldo was a musician, played the trumpet and the drums. At the age of 14 years financial hardships forced him to work on the streets selling snacks, worked as a farm boy and took care of kids to survive. He traveled around town in the Department of La Guajira also singing at parties. He dreamed of becoming a ballads singer or soap opera actor.

In 1992 participated along Poncho Cotes Jr. in a song contest in the Colombian town of San Juan del Cesar, in La Guajira. The song "Un ángel mas en el cielo" of his authorship was a dedication to his role model singer Rafael Orozco Maestre, then recently deceased, and lead singer of the Binomio de Oro de America vallenato group.

Israel Romero the accordionist from the Binomio de Oro de America became interested on Centeno's talent and hired him as backup singer for the group. Centeno sang the group hits "No te vayas", "Celos", "Manantial de amor", among others and also got to be recorded by the Binomio de Oro; "Volvió el dolor", "Me ilusioné", "Amigo el corazón" and "Me vas a extrañar".

== Discography ==
=== With Binomio de Oro de América ===
- 1993 - Todo Corazón
- 1994 - De la Mano con el Pueblo
- 1995 - Lo Nuestro
- 1996 - A su Gusto
- 1997 - Seguimos por lo Alto
- 1998 - 2000
- 1999 - Más cerca de tí
- 2000 - Difícil de Igualar
- 2001 - Haciendo Historia
- 2003 - Que Viva el Vallenato
- 2004 - En todo su Esplendor
- 2005 - Grafiti de Amor

On December 31, 2005 Centeno decided to leave Binomio de Oro and joined initially accordionist Robert Urbina, but later teamed up with Israel Romero's nephew, Juan Fernando "El Morre" Romero to create their own vallenato group.

=== With Morre Romero and Ronald Urbina ===
- 2006 - Ave Libre
- 2008 - Inconfundible

=== With Ronald Urbina ===
- 2012 - Así Canto Yo
- 2016 - Todas Son Mías
- 2018 - De Parranda
- 2022 - Feliz Aniversario

== Awards and nominations ==
=== Latin Grammy Awards ===
Year	Recipient	Award	Result
2018	De Parranda	Best Cumbia/Vallenato Song/Album	Nominated
2022	Feliz Aniversario	Best Cumbia/Vallenato Song/Album	Won

=== Premios Nuestra Tierra ===
Year	Recipient	Award	Result
2014	Entrada Sin Salida	Vallenato Song of the Year	Nominated
2022	Batalla de Reyes y Reinas, Concierto virtual	Best Concert Tour	Nominated
2023	Déjala Ir (feat. Jorge Celedón)	Vallenato Song of the Year	Nominated
2023	Jean Carlos Centeno	Vallenato Artist	Nominated
2024	Besarte (feat. La Combinación Vallenata)	Vallenato Song of the Year	Nominated

== See also ==
- Binomio de Oro de America
- Jorgito Celedon
