= Miguel López (musician) =

Colombian accordionist

- Born: Miguel Antonio López Gutiérrez; 12 March 1938; La Paz, Colombia
- Died: 12 September 2023 (aged 85) Valledupar, Colombia
- Genres: Vallenato
- Family: Elberto López (brother); Alvarito López (son)

Miguel Antonio López Gutiérrez (Note: In this Spanish name, the first or paternal surname is López and the second or maternal family name is Gutiérrez.) (1938–2023) was a Colombian accordionist. He won the accordionist competition of the 1972 Vallenato Legend Festival, and afterwards formed the vallenato group Los Hermanos López with Jorge Oñate and his brothers Elberto and Pablo.

== Biography ==
López was born on 12 March 1938 in La Paz, in the Colombian department of Cesar (although at that time still in Magdalena). His father Pablo Rafael López Gutiérrez and grandfather Juan Bautista "Juancito" López Molina were both musicians.

In 1972 López beat Andrés Landero and Julio de la Ossa to win the accordionist competition of the fifth Vallenato Legend Festival, accompanied by Jorge Oñate on vocals and guacharaca. This led some to call López the "mute king of vallenato" (Spanish: "rey vallenato mudo"), because in traditional vallenato trios, the accordionist is also the lead vocalist; later, this split became a selling point.

Following his win, López formed the vallenato group Los Hermanos López with Oñate and his brothers Elberto López and Pablo Rafael López. They recorded nine LPs and were the first vallenato group to perform at the Barranquilla Carnival's Festival of Orchestras. Los Hermanos López disbanded when Oñate left in 1974, and López formed a new group with singer Freddy Peralta.

López had twelve children. His son Alvarito López won the accordionist competition of the Vallenato Legend Festival in 1992, and later played with Diomedes Díaz; his son Román López played accordion professionally with Silvestre Dangond.

López was diagnosed with diabetes at 50, and was fitted with a pacemaker in 2016. He died on 12 September 2023 in Valledupar, and the Governor of Cesar declared three days of mourning.
