= Álvaro López (Colombian musician) =

Colombian accordionist

- Also known as: Alvarito López
- Born: Álvaro López Carrillo; 22 August 1958 (age 67); Santa Marta, Colombia
- Genres: Vallenato

Álvaro López Carrillo (Note: In this Spanish name, the first or paternal surname is López and the second or maternal family name is Carrillo.) (born 1958), also known as Alvarito López, is a Colombian vallenato accordionist. He was crowned vallenato king in 1992 for winning the professional accordionist competition of the Vallenato Legend Festival, and in 2017 he was king of kings. López has recorded several albums with singers including Jorge Oñate and Diomedes Díaz.

== Biography ==
López was born on 22 August 1958 in Santa Marta, in the Colombian department of Magdalena. His father Miguel López and uncle Elberto López were both vallenato accordionists, and were vallenato kings at the Vallenato Legend Festival in 1972 and 1980 respectively.

López began playing accordion as a child, and started performing at the age of 14. He won the amateur accordionist competition of the Vallenato Legend Festival in 1976 and 1979. In 1986, López released the album Ahora con Álvaro López with Jorge Oñate, the first of eleven albums that they recorded together. López and Oñate also won several Golden Congos at the Barranquilla Carnival. López has also recorded with Beto Zabaleta and Rafael Santos Díaz, and was the last accordionist to record an album with Diomedes Díaz.

In 1992, López won the professional accordionist competition of the Vallenato Legend Festival and was crowned vallenato king. In 2017 he won the king of kings competition, open only to previous kings, defeating Christian Camilo Peña (second), Almes Granados (third), and his cousin Navin López. El Universal reported that the favourite to win had initially been Wilber Mendoza, son of Colacho Mendoza. López was accompanied by Widinso Arias Martínez on caja and Ricardo José Vega Vásquez on guacharaca; they performed the merengue "Alcirita" (written by Luis Enrique Martínez), the paseo "Consuelo" (by Rafael Escalona), the puya "Dejala Vení" (by Nafer Durán), and the son "Delicado y Cencillito" (by Pacho Rada).
