= Israel Romero =

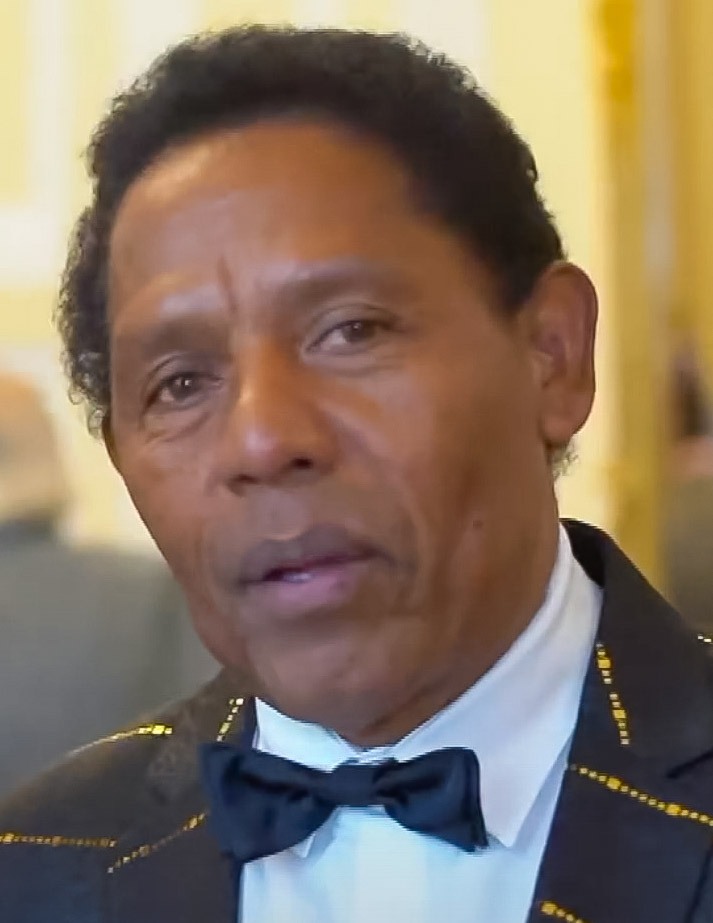

Background information
- Also known as: Pollo Isrra
- Born: Israel Romero Ospino
- Origin: Villanueva,15 October 1955 La Guajira; Colombia
- Genres: Vallenato, Latin
- Instruments: Accordion
- Years active: 1976–present
- Label: Sony Music
- Member of: Binomio de Oro de América

Israel Romero Ospino or popularly known as "El Pollo Isra" (Born in Villanueva, La Guajira in 1955) is a Colombian vallenato musician, composer and accordionist. Romero was along Rafael Orozco Maestre the founder of the vallenato group Binomio de Oro de América.

== Discography ==
From 1977 to 1991 the Binomio de Oro recorded 20 albums not counting special contributions to other artist of the "Fiesta Vallenata" compilations, interrupted with the death of lead singer Rafael Orozco.

- 1977 - Binomio de Oro (1977 album)
- 1977 - Por lo Alto
- 1978 - Enamorado como Siempre
- 1978 - Los Elegidos (album)
- 1979 - Super Vallenato
- 1980 - Clase aparte
- 1980 - De Cache
- 1981 - 5 Años de Oro
- 1982 - Festival Vallenato
- 1983 - Fuera de Serie
- 1983 - Mucha Calidad
- 1984 - Somos Vallenato
- 1985 - Superior
- 1986 - Binomio de Oro
- 1987 - En Concierto
- 1988 - Internacional
- 1989 - De Exportación
- 1990 - De Fiesta con el Binomio
- 1991 - Por Siempre
- 1991 - De América

Singer Gabriel "El Gaby" García replaced Orozco

- 1993 - Todo Corazón
- 1994 - De la Mano con el Pueblo
- 1995 - Lo Nuestro

Jean Carlos Centeno and Jorge Celedon became lead singers

- 1996 - A su Gusto
- 1997 - Seguimos por lo Alto
- 1998 - 2000
- 1999 - Más cerca de tí

In 1999 singer Jorge Celedon quits the group, replaced by Junior Santiago.

- 2000 - Difícil de Igualar
- 2001 - Haciendo Historia
- 2003 - Que Viva el Vallenato
- 2004 - En todo su Esplendor
- 2005 - Grafiti de Amor
- 2006 - Impredecible
