= Juan Joyita =

Colombian telenovela

- Genre: Telenovela
- Created by: Magda Quintero
- Directed by: Rodrigo Triana
- Starring: Catalina Londoño; Andrés Suárez
- Opening theme: "Podemos Hacernos Daño" by Juanes
- Country of origin: Colombia
- Original language: Spanish
- No. of seasons: 1
- No. of episodes: 240

Production
- Production company: Televideo

Original release
- Network: RCN Televisión

Related
- Yo soy Betty, la fea; El inútil

Juan Joyita shown onscreen as Juan Joyita quiere ser Caballero is a Colombian telenovela created by Magda Quintero and broadcast on RCN Televisión in 2001.

== Plot ==
The story revolves around the Hacienda La Herradura, a place where a hidden treasure lies, with a curse, which befalls all who find it. One day Juan's father is discovered by Helena while seeking the treasure, and at that moment, a curse fell on their family. Confusion sets it when Juan's father is murdered and Lucrecia's brother, Tomas, disappears. 20 years later, Juan (Andrés Suárez) returns to avenge his father's death. But he learns that Tomás, Lucrecia's brother is still missing. Juan decides to usurp the identity of Tomás to start his revenge against the Caballero family, but everything becomes even more confused as he must choose between revenge and love for Lucrecia (Catalina Londoño).

== Cast ==
- Catalina Londoño as Lucrecia "Lucas" Caballero
- Andrés Suárez as Juan Ventura / Tomás Caballero
- Consuelo Luzardo as Helena Caballero
- Diego Cadavid as Roberto
- Alejandro López as Marcelo Villa Caballero
- Pablo Uribe as Tomás Caballero
