= Clase aparte =

Clase Aparte

Studio album by Binomio de Oro
- Released: November 26, 1980
- Genre: Vallenato
- Label: Codiscos

Binomio de Oro chronology
Super Vallenato (1979)	Clase Aparte (1980)	De Cache (1980)

Clase aparte is a 1980 studio album by Colombian group Binomio de Oro. The album contains the hits "Dime pajarito", "Voz de acordeones" - dedicated like the album to the murdered writer Octavio Daza, and "Habíamos terminado".

== Track listing ==
1. Dime, pajarito (María Cristina de Daza and Octavio Daza)
2. Pa mi amigo el querendón (Lácides Redondo)
3. Habíamos terminado (Roberto Calderón)
4. Qué te pasa, María Tere (es:Julio Oñate Martínez)
5. Recuerdos (Hernando Marín)
6. El que espabila pierde (Lenín Bueno Suárez)
7. Quise manchar tu alma (Fernando Meneses Romero)
8. La colegiala (Rubén Darío Salcedo/Julio de la Ossa)
9. Canción para una amiga (Rosendo Romero)
10. Voz de acordeones (es:Tomás Darío Gutiérrez).
11. Canción para una amiga (Rosendo Romero)
