= Hernando Marín =

Colombian songwriter and musician

- Born: Hernando José Marín Lacouture; 1 September 1944; El Tablazo, San Juan del Cesar, Colombia
- Died: 5 September 1999 (aged 55) Los Palmitos, Colombia
- Genres: Vallenato

Hernando José Marín Lacouture (Note: In this Spanish name, the first or paternal surname is Marín and the second or maternal family name is Lacouture.) (1944–1999) was a Colombian vallenato songwriter and musician. His songs have been recorded by artists including Diomedes Díaz, Binomio de Oro, and Los Hermanos Zuleta.

== Biography ==
Marín was born on 1 September 1944 in El Tablazo, a village in San Juan del Cesar in the Colombian department of La Guajira.

In 1974 Marín was taken by folklorist José Parodi to the Festival del Fique, where he won the unpublished song competition with his composition "Vallenato y Guajiro". In 1992 he won the unpublished song competition of the Vallenato Legend Festival with "Valledupar del Alma".

Marín composed several successful vallento songs that were recorded by artists including Diomedes Díaz, Binomio de Oro, and Los Hermanos Zuleta. He was particularly known for his skill at writing both romantic and political protest songs; Marcos Fidel Vega Seña described him as "the first and greatest model of the romantic guajira song and protest voice in vallenato." He also occasionally recorded music, notably on the records La Llave (with Alfredo Gutiérrez) and Valledupar del Alma (with Jhony Gámez).

Marín died on 5 September 1999 when the taxi he was in crashed in Los Palmitos. He was buried the next day in the Central Cemetery of Valledupar.

== Musical style and compositions ==
Marín wrote songs in the Colombian folk music genre of vallenato. The first song of his to be recorded was "Vallenato y Guajiro", by the conjunto of Beto Martínez and Miguel Ahumada. His particularly successful compositions include "Olvída Esa Pena" (performed by Los Betos) and "Lluvia de Verano" (performed by Diomedes Díaz). In 1976 a recording of his song "La Ley del Embudo" by Beto Zabaleta became the anthem of a political movement. His other notable compositions include "Campesino Vallenato", "Juramento", "Sanjuanerita", "El Ángel del Camino", "Mis Muchachitas", "Pecadora", "Lágrimas de Sangre", "Mentiras de Las Mujeres", "Girasol", "Bebiendo Yo", "Valledupar del Alma", "La Dama Guajira", "Campesino Vallenato", "El Mocoso", "El Gavilán Mayor", "La Creciente", "Los Maestros", "La Primera Piedra", "El Enfermo", and "Volvieron".

Marín's song "Canta Conmigo", which was recorded in 1989 by Diomedes Díaz, was sung by the crowd at his funeral in Valledupar.
