= Jimmy Zambrano =

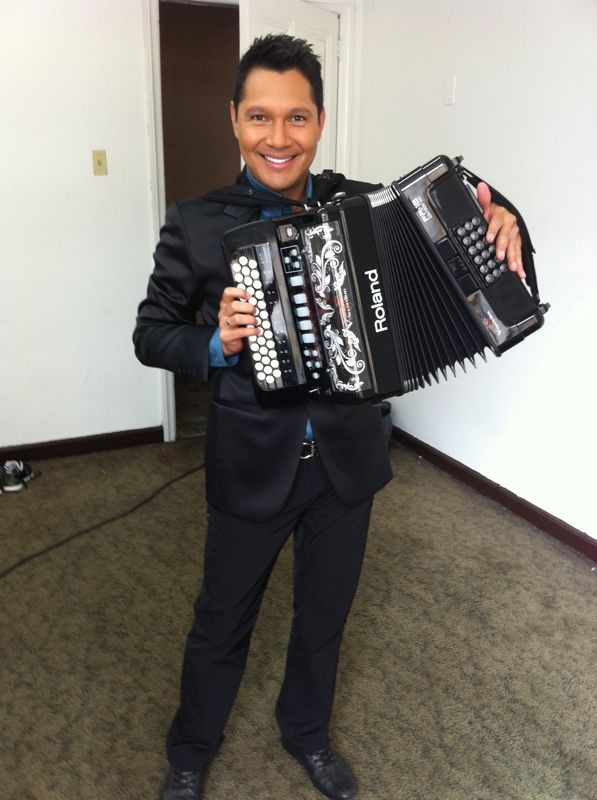
- Jimmy Zambrano a Hohner accordion

Background information
- Birth name: Jaime Omar Zambrano Flórez
- Born: November 2, 1967 (age 57)
- Origin: Guamal, Magdalena, Colombia
- Genres: Vallenato
- Occupation: Accordion player
- Instrument: Accordion
- Years active: 1997 - present
- Labels: FM Discos & Cintas, Sony Music
- Website: Official site

Jimmy Zambrano (born November 2, 1967, in Guamal, Magdalena), is a Colombian accordion player.

Born in Colombia, he left at an early age for Caracas, Venezuela, where he studied music and specialized in piano. There, he was called by Los Melódicos of Renato Capriles to record a vallenato song by Poncho Zuleta titled "Luzmila," which became the first song and recording by this artist. In 1993, he recorded an album called "Vallenato y más" with the group "Los Clásicos," alongside Aníbal Caicedo and Jair Castañeda. In 1995, Omar Geles discovered his talent in a tour in Venezuela and invited him to belong to Los Diablitos as keyboard player, with whom he performed until 1999. During his time with Los Diablitos, he produced and arranged various music genres and formed a vallenato ensemble known as "Los Emigrantes," with Aníbal Caidedo.

In 1999, he started playing with Jorge Celedón, who had just left the Binomio de Oro de América. Together, they recorded 9 albums, earning international acclaim. With Celedón, he won a Latin Grammy in 2007 in the Cumbia Vallenato category. In 2012, the duo broke up as the result of disagreements. In 2013, Zambrano met Dubán Bayona, another ex-Binomio de Oro performer, with whom he released a first album called Métete en el viaje, which has received favorable reviews.

== Discography ==
=== Aníbal Caicedo (Los Emigrantes) ===
- Un Nuevo Sendero - FM Discos y Cintas - 1997
- Que Hable El Alma - FM Discos y Cintas - 1998

=== Jorge Celedón ===
- Romántico como yo - Sony Music - 2000
- Llévame en tus sueños - Sony Music - 2001
- Canto vallenato - Sony Music - 2002
- ¡Juepa je! - Sony Music - 2004
- Grande éxitos en vivo - Sony Music - 2005
- Son... Para el mundo - Sony Music - 2006
- De lo nuevo de lo mejor - Sony Music - 2008
- La invitación - Sony Music - 2009
- Lo que tú necesitas - Sony Music - 2011
- Celedón sin fronteras Vol 1 (Shared album with Gustavo García) - Sony Music - 2013
- Celedón sin fronteras Vol 2 (Shared album with Gustavo García) - Sony Music - 2014

=== Dubán Bayona ===
- Métete en el viaje - Sony Music - 2013

=== Other artists - singles ===
- "Dismelódicos (Los Melódicos)" (Song "Luzmila") - 1984
- "Toby Love Reloaded" (Toby Love ft Jorge Celedón) (Song "Amores como el tuyo") - 2007
- "Viento a favor" (Alejandro Fernández) (Song "Eres") - Sony Music - 2008
- "Amaia Montero 2" (Amaia Montero) (Song "Caminando") - Sony Music - 2011
- "A contratiempo" (Juan Fernando Velasco ft Jorge Celedón) (Song "Yo nací aquí") - 2012
- Primera fila día 2 (Cristian Castro ft Jorge Celedon) (Song "Lloran las rosas") - 2014
