= Checo Acosta =

Colombian folk singer

- Born: Alcibiades Antonio Acosta Agudelo; June 14, 1965 (age 61); Soledad, Atlántico
- Origin: Colombian
- Genres: Folk, Latin
- Instrument: Voice
- Years active: 1987–present
- Labels: Discos Fuentes, Sony

Alcibiades Antonio Acosta Agudelo (June 14, 1965 in Soledad, Atlántico, Colombia) better known by his stage name Checo Acosta, is a Colombian folk singer.

== Biography ==
Acosta is the son of the singer Alci Acosta. Since the age of seven he was baptized with the stage name Checo Acosta because of his love for soccer. His father compared him to a Czech footballer, as he has ancestors born in that nation. At a very young age he would sing ballads at children's festivals. Acosta wanted to be a ballad or bolero singer, but destiny led him to tropical music.

He has 4 children, 2 from his first marriage named Lauren, who has accompanied him throughout his artistic career, performing as his main dancer, and Anthony de Jesús Acosta Donado with the designer Kalina Donado Osorio, and 2 daughters, from his second marriage named Sharon Janeth and Naomi Acosta Tobón with the designer, dancer and choreographer Jazmin Elenea Tobón Marin.

== Career ==
Acosta was a part of the group and/or played with Joe Arroyo, La Renovación, Adolfo Echeverría, Juan Piña, Grupo Star de Medellín, Conjunto Calisón and Joseíto Martínez. Until 1987, when he marked his album debut alongside composer, Hugo Molinares, titled Conjunto Calisón which featured hit songs like "Mi Pequeña Nataly, La Montaña" and "Morenita Caribeña". After these hits, he decided to debut his own tropical band in Barranquilla in 1988.

Later came hits like "Llorarás Llorarás", "Lo Que el Negro Quiere", "Te Quiero", "Homenaje a Héctor Lavoe", "Traicionera" (sang with his father), "Checumbia", which gained him international success, "Checomanía", "La Cucaracha (A Barata)", "La Cinturita", "Maestranza N.º 2", "Chemapalé", "Carnavalero", "A Son Palenque" and "El Quererén", among others. He has also released other hits like "Sobate El Coco", "Me Rasca el Galillo" and "El Guacamayo" that belong to his album compilation Checazos de Carnaval 3 nominated for Best Album - Cumbia/Vallento at the 2007 Latin Grammy Awards in Las Vegas, Nevada.

== Discography ==
- 1989 - Sencillamente
- 1990 - Camino Real
- 1992 - De Colombia
- 1993 - Con Sabor Y Sentimiento
- 1995 - Que Viva el Amor
- 1996 - Esta de Moda
- 1997 - Herencia
- 1999 - Checomania
- 2000 - Checazos de Carnaval
- 2007 - 15 Anos De Exitos
- 2009 - El folclor de mi tierra
- 2013 - Checumbias

== Awards ==
- Nominated Latin Grammy Awards of 2007 - Best Cumbia/Vallenato Album: (Checazos De Carnaval 3)
- Nominated Latin Grammy Awards of 2010 - Best Folk Album: (El Folclor de Mi Tierra)
