= José María Ramos =

Colombian accordionist

- Also known as: Chema Ramos, El Décimo
- Born: José María Ramos Rodríguez; 28 October 1948; Urumita, Colombia
- Died: 25 September 2020 (aged 71) Floridablanca, Colombia
- Genres: Vallenato

José María Ramos Rodríguez (Note: In this Spanish name, the first or paternal surname is Ramos and the second or maternal family name is Rodríguez.) (1948–2020), also known as Chema Ramos, was a Colombian accordionist. He won the accordionist competition of the Vallenato Legend Festival in 1977 at the age of 28.

== Biography ==
=== Early life ===
Ramos was born on 28 October 1948 in Urumita, in the Colombian department of La Guajira. His grandfather was a musician, and his father José María Ramos Rojas taught him to play accordion.

=== The Vallenato Legend Festival and later career ===
In 1976 Ramos won the semi-professional accordionist competition of the Vallenato Legend Festival. In 1977 he won the professional accordionist competition, accompanied by Simón Herrera on caja and Abel Suárez on guacharaca, defeating several competitors including Alberto Muegues, Miguel Ahumada, Ramón Vargas, Raúl "Chiche" Martínez, Rafael Salas, and Juancho Polo Valencia. Ramos was 28 when he won, which made him the youngest winner of the competition at the time. Because he was the tenth winner of the competition, he was given the nickname "El Décimo".

Following his win, Ramos played in the conjunto of Carlos Lleras Araújo, and also recorded with artists including Iván Villazón, Poncho Zuleta, Silvio Brito, and Fabián Corrales. He later formed a group called Las Glorias del Vallenato, with whom he was still playing at the Casa de la Cultura in Valledupar in 2016.

=== Family and death ===
Ramos was married to Emilia Mercedes Navarro, with whom he had six sons and one daughter. His eldest son José María "Chemita" Ramos Navarro won the accordionist competition of the Vallenato Legend Festival in 2000. His son Edward José is an accordionist, and his son Alí José has played guacharaca with singers including Jorge Oñate, Diomedes Díaz, Fabián Corrales, and Jorge Celedón.

Ramos died in hospital in Floridablanca on 25 September 2020.
