= Hugo Carlos Granados =

Colombian accordionist

- Also known as: El Rey Viajero
- Born: Hugo Carlos Granados Córdoba; 24 February 1966 (age 60)
- Genre: Vallenato
- Years active: 1980–present
- Family: Ovidio Granados (father); Almes Granados (uncle)

Hugo Carlos Granados Córdoba (Note: In this Spanish name, the first or paternal surname is Granados and the second or maternal family name is Córdoba.) (born 1966) is a Colombian vallenato accordionist. He was crowned vallenato king for winning the accordionist competition of the Vallenato Legend Festival in 1999, and in 2007 he won the king of kings competition.

== Biography ==
=== Early life ===
Hugo Carlos Granados Córdoba was born on 24 February 1966 to Ovidio Granados and Ninia Córdoba. He was given an accordion at the age of 5 by his father, and at 8 he could properly play his first song, "La Polaca". He went to school at the Colegio Instpecam in Valledupar.

=== Music career ===
Granados won the child accordionist competition of the Vallenato Legend Festival in 1980, and the amateur accordionist competition in 1986. In 1987 he recorded his first song, with Javier Vega. In 1992 he formed Los Ases del Vallenato with Beto Mario Fontalvo, and they recorded two albums for Discos Fuentes. He also recorded with Ivo Díaz.

Granados won the professional accordionist competition of the Vallenato Legend Festival in 1999, and was crowned vallenato king. He was accompanied by Odacir Montenegro on guacharaca and vocals, and José Jaime Murgas on caja. Second place went to Harold Rivera, and third to José María Ramos Jr. Following his win Granados toured in Venezuela, Peru, Mexico, and the United States, which gave him the nickname "El Rey Viajero" (Spanish for "the travelling king").

In 2007 Granados won the king of kings competition of the Vallenato Legend Festival, which is held every 5 years and is only open to accordionists who have previously been crowned king. There were 18 other competitors, including his brother Juan José Granados; second and third place went to Navín López and Chiche Martínez respectively.

In 2016 Granados travelled to Lebanon, the United Arab Emirates, and Morocco, to perform vallenato with a conjunto that included his son Hugo Carlos Jr.

=== Musical style ===
Granados plays a traditional style of vallenato, and is critical of modern trends in the genre.
