= Central Cemetery of Valledupar =

Cemetery in Cesar Department, Colombia

Details
- Established: 1806
- Location: Valledupar
- Country: Colombia
- Coordinates: 10°28′32″N 73°14′53″W

The Central Cemetery of Valledupar (Spanish: Cementerio Central de Valledupar) is the oldest cemetery in the Colombian city of Valledupar, capital of the department of Cesar. It was founded in 1806 by order of lieutenant governor Andrés Pinto Cotrín and is located on the current Calle 15 between carreras 9 and 10, in the El Centro neighborhood of the city.

== Notable interments ==
- Leandro Díaz (1928–2013), vallenato musical composer.
- Rafael Escalona (1926–2009), Vallenato musical composer, winner of numerous awards and recognitions, is considered one of the best Vallenato composers, his biography inspired the making of a series and his name appears in One Hundred Years of Solitude.
- Hernando Marín (1944–1999), vallenato songwriter.
- Emiliano Zuleta (1912–2005), composer, accordionist and singer of Vallenato music.
