= Pedro Palacio =

Colombian actor

- Born: Pedro Antonio Palacio Cruz; June 14, 1978 (age 46); Barranquilla, Colombia
- Occupation(s): Actor and model
- Known for: Anibal Conrado of Chepe Fortuna.

Pedro Antonio Palacio Cruz is a Colombian actor known for his role as Anival Conrado in Chepe Fortuna.

== History ==
Palacio was born in Barranquilla, located north of Colombia on the Atlantic coast. He began his career in 2002 as an actor in Protagonistas de novela - Colombia, a reality show. In 2003, he was hired for the soap opera La costeña y el cachaco in the role of Kike.

== Filmography ==
Year	Title	Role
2002	Protagonistas de Novela - Colombia	Himself
2003-2003	La Costeña y El Cachaco	Kike
2004	Al ritmo de tu corazón	Oswaldo
2004-2005	La isla de los famosos: Una aventura pirata	Himself
2005-2006	Juegos Prohibidos	Carlos Francisco
2007-2008	The Mark of Desire	Gabriel Santamarina
2010	Chepe Fortuna	Anibal Conrado
2011	Wild Flower	Piruetas
