= Juan Piña =

Colombian singer and songwriter (born 1951)

- Born: Juan de la Cruz Piña Valderrama; 18 June 1951 (age 75); San Marcos, Colombia
- Years active: 1961–present

Juan de la Cruz Piña Valderrama (Note: In this Spanish name, the first or paternal surname is Piña and the second or maternal family name is Valderrama.) (born 1951) is a Colombian singer and songwriter. As a child he sang in the band Juan Piña y sus Muchachos, alongside his siblings and his father (also called Juan Piña). He later sang with the Hermanos Martelo, Binomio de Oro, and led his own band Juan Piña y la Revelación. Piña has won several Golden Congos at the Barranquilla Carnival, and his album Le Canta a San Jacinto won a Latin Grammy in 2012.

== Biography ==
=== Early life and career ===
Juan de la Cruz Piña Valderrama was born on 18 June 1951 in San Marcos, in the Colombian department of Sucre. His mother was Blanca Rosa Valderrama, and his father was Juan de la Cruz Piña Arrieta, a music teacher. Piña's father formed the musical group Juan Piña y sus Muchachos with his children, and they played their first show in 1961, at the Teatro Carmencita in Montería, when Piña was 11 years old. Piña's father died when he was 15.

At the age of 16, Piña joined the Orquesta de los Hermanos Martelo on vocals, alongside Hernando Barbosa, María Elena, and Edwin Betancourt. He sang with them for seven years, which included a trip to New York in 1968, before leaving aged 24 to form the band Juan Piña y la Revelación with his brother Carlos Piña, a clarinetist. La Revelación were together for 12 years, and had hits with "Las mujeres de marusa", "Baila Simón", and "El machín". Piña later sang with the Colombian All Stars, a salsa project that also included Wilson Saoko, Joe Arroyo, and Piper Pimienta. He has also sung with vallenato artists including Binomio de Oro, Jorge Oñate, Juancho Rois, and Orangel Maestre. Piña won several Golden Congos at the Barranquilla Carnival in the 1980s.

=== Later career ===
Piña's 2012 album Le Canta a San Jacinto, which he recorded at his own expense, won a Latin Grammy in the category of Best Cumbia/Vallenato Album. He has since had three other albums nominated for the same award. A 2017 article by Radio Nacional de Colombia wrote that "in recent years, Piña has breathed new life into his career by recording for independent labels," recording with singers including Milly Quezada, and Andy Montañez.

== Awards ==
| Award | Year | Category | Work(s) | Result | Refs. |
|---|---|---|---|---|---|
| Latin Grammy | 2012 | Best Cumbia/Vallenato Album | Le Canta a San Jacinto | Won | |
| Latin Grammy | 2014 | Best Cumbia/Vallenato Album | Cántandole a Mi Valle | Nominated | |
| Latin Grammy | 2018 | Best Cumbia/Vallenato Album | La Elegancia de la Música | Nominated | |
| Latin Grammy | 2019 | Best Cumbia/Vallenato Album | Para Mis Maestros Con Respeto | Nominated | |
| Golden Congo | 1980 | Group | —N/a | Won | |
| Golden Congo | 1981 | Tropical group | —N/a | Won | |
| Golden Congo | 1983 | Tropical group | —N/a | Won | |
| Golden Congo | 1993 | Folk group | —N/a | Won | |
