= Grupo Bemtú =

- Origin: Cali, Colombia
- Genres: Salsa
- Years active: 1982–present
- Labels: Codiscos; Kañaveral Records; Philips Records
- Members: Carlos Bejarano (Director)
- Past members: Alejandro Delgado (Drums), Luis Mario Cuervo (bass), Alvaro Cuervo (Singer), Marino D'León (Singer), Henry Franco (Singer), Bautista Cifuentes (Alt Sax), Jairo Perez (Tenor Sax), Rafael Diaz (Trumpet), Carlos Riascos (Congas, Singer), José Alberto Oliveros (Singer), José Raúl Arizabaleta (Piano), Armando Vargas (Timbales), Enrique "Kike" Toledo (Percussion, sound engineer), Victor Chávez (Bass), Guillermo Gómez (Bass, Singer).

Grupo Bemtú is a salsa group founded by Carlos Bejarano, Alejandro Delgado and Luis Mario Cuervo in 1982 in Cali, Colombia. The band is perhaps best known for their biggest hit "Así Vivo Yo" from their 1993 album Sangre Nueva.

== History ==
=== Origin ===
In 1980, at a military base in Colombia, Alejandro Delgado and Luis Mario Cuervo some of his fellow soldiers decided to form a salsa band among themselves.

=== Founding ===
Upon his return to the city of Cali, Delgado, inspired by the tremendous moments he had with the band at the military base, got together with his friends Luis Mario Cuervo, Oscar Carvajal, and Jose Alberto Oliveros. They, along with numerous other musicians formed a band. On August 7, 1982, Delgado and the musicians got together again, but this time under the direction of Jose "Lolo" Gil, and formed Grupo Bemtú. In 1993, the band is owned by Carlos Bejarano, who direct the band to this day.

== Discography ==
- Me Tomo Uno & Mi Delirio (Singles) (Codiscos, 1987)
- Sobresaliendo (Codiscos, 1988)
- A Millón & Para Decir Te Amo (Singles) (Kañaveral Records, 1989)
- Canción Para Tu Nombre & A Que Te Pegas (Singles) (Phillips, 1991)
- Salsa y Corazon (Phillips, 1991)
- Sangre Nueva (BMG, 1993)
- Puente al Infinito (BMG, 1995)
- Cuando Acaba El Placer, single included in album "Artistas Changüi, Vol.2" (Changüí Records, 2000)
- Amor De Noche Buena (Single) (2004)
- Luna De Miel (New Version, Single) (2007)
