= Chepe Fortuna =

2010–2011 Colombian telenovela

Chepe Fortuna is a Colombian traditional comedy telenovela, produced by RCN Televisión in 2010 and 2011. It stars Javier Jattin and Taliana Vargas, with Kristina Lilley, Pedro Palacio, Susana Rojas, Luigi Aycardi, the first actor Gerardo Calero and first actress Margalida Castro, in addition to the first actors Judy Henríquez, Carlos Muñoz and Consuelo Luzardo. The production proposal was based on the setting of a comic story in the Caribbean Region of Colombia, so 90% of the cast is originally from the Colombian coast, including the protagonists.

The leading characters come from different social backgrounds, one being a poor fisherman fighting against industrialization and the other being an environmentalist from the industrializing family.

The librettos were created by Miguel Ángel Baquero and Eloisa Infante, and the direction was carried out by Mario Ribero, who had previously directed successful comedies such as Novia para dos, Yo soy Betty, la fea and Los Reyes. This production holds the record for having the most watched final episode in the history of private television in Colombia, reaching an audience of 53.3 in the household audience index and 23.6 in people, an unprecedented figure. In Panama, the telenovela was a success on TVN screens, reaching 6.0 points of audience index and in Colombia an index of 23.0 points.

Thanks to the success obtained, the story had a spin-off called Casa de reinas, in which most of the main and secondary characters return, but only those who had an alternate story to that of Chepe and Niña. Casa de reinas enjoyed a great reception from the public, being broadcast in late 2012 and early 2013, by RCN Televisión, the same network that has placed successes in Latin America, the United States and Europe, such as Betty, the ugly, Sincere love, La Pola, The last happy marriage, El Capo 1 and 2.

== Cast ==
- Javier Jattin - José "Chepe" Fortuna.
- Taliana Vargas - Niña Cabrales.
- Pedro Palacio - Aníbal Conrado.
- Susana Rojas - Yadira Cienfuegos.
- Carlos Muñoz - Jeremías Cabrales.
- Consuelo Luzardo - Alfonsina Pumarejo.
- Judy Henríquez - Josefa "Doña Jose" Fortuna.
- Margalida Castro - Úrsula Eloísa Lacouture Infante de Cabrales / Bárbara Fon Braun Lacouture Infante.
- Kristina Lilley - Malvina Samper Viuda de Cabrales.
- Lorna Cepeda - Petra de Meza "La Celosa".
- Bruno Díaz - El Padre Tito.
- Adriana Ricardo - Asunción Cabrales.
- Florina Lemaitre - Perfecta de Conrado.
- Gerardo Calero - Bruno Conrado.
- Rodrigo Candamil - Lucas de la Rosa.
- Mile Vergara - Rosalía Cabrales.
- Luigi Aycardi - Francisco Antonio Londoño "El Paisa".
- Mabel Moreno / Catalina Londoño - Reina Carolina Araujo Cabrales.
- Camila Zárate - Herlinda Fortuna / Conrado.
- Julio Meza - Julio Bolívar "Chipi Chipi".
- Vetto Gálvez - Aquilino Meza "El Bellaco".
- Paula Castaño - Milagros Ovalle Cabrales.
- Katty Rangel - Cindy Meza.
- Jorge Monterrosa - Kike Rentería "Pastelito".
- Mauricio Mejía - Pipe Daza.
- Victoria Hernández - Doña Concha.
- Luis Tamayo - Abdulio.
- Rafael Cardozo - Moisés Ovalle.
- Rosalba Goenaga - Colombia Castillo.
- Omeris Arrieta - Venezuela Castillo.
- Gustavo Angarita - El Doctor Arcadio Ribero.
- Mónica Layton - Leyla.
- Juan Mauricio Julio - Monocuco.
- Roberto Cuello - Caresusto.
- Obeida Benavides - Candelaria.
- Elmis Reyes - Ruth.
- Gina Vallecia - Niris.
- Leopolda Rojas - Yade.
- Julio del Mar - Cepeda.
- Germán Quintero - Zamudio.
- Alfonso Ortiz - Angulo.
- Alexandra Serrano - Ximena.
- Myriam De Lourdes - "Cuca" Barraza.
- María Irene Toro - Josefina "Pepa" Piñeres.
- Moisés Rivillas - El Comandante Oñate.
- Ariel Hernández - Memo.
- Carolina Sabino - María del Pilar Jiménez "Marichuly".
- Rafael Ricardo - Rafa.
- Yaneth Waldman - Matilde Viuda de la Rosa.
- Jenny Osorio - Alcira Estrada "La Caleña".
- Andrés Estrada - Caliche.
- Juan Sebastián Parada - Manaure Fortuna Cienfuegos / Manaure Conrado Cienfuegos
- Astrid Jungito - Missia Delfina.
- Jennifer Stefens - Socorro Camacho.
- Lorena Meritano - Minerva Samper
- Abel Rodríguez - Samir.
- Aco Pérez - Agente Ceballos
- Mary Herrera Osorio - La Bruja
- Endry Cardeño - La motilona.
- Martin De Francisco - Kakiu Cienfuegos.
- Sandra Guzman - Melisa Sanchez De Cienfuegos
- Germán Escallón - Don Firotio Vargas El Boyacenes
- Juan Manuel Lenis - La chiqui.
- Jorge Cardenas - Luis De Mar El Pochico
- Jesús Forero - Hugo De Mar El Gatio
- Valentina Arbelaez - Cristina De Mar
- Omar Murillo - Oscar Mina El Chocoano
- Aída Bossa - Ajeandra Granjos De Mar
- Juan Pablo Gamboa - Crisitan Jackson El Gingo
- Bianca Arango - Lola Vargas
- Mario Espitia - Fernándo Soler
