= Chico Bolaño =

Colombian accordionist and songwriter (1902–1962)

- Also known as: Chico Bolaños
- Born: Francisco Irenio Bolaño Marsal; 1902; El Molino, Colombia
- Died: 1962 (aged 59) Bosconia, Colombia
- Genres: Vallenato

Francisco Irenio Bolaño Marsal (Note: In this Spanish name, the first or paternal surname is Bolaño and the second or maternal family name is Marsal. Also spelled Marzal.) (1902–1962), known as Chico Bolaño or Chico Bolaños, was a Colombian vallenato accordionist and songwriter. Bolaño was an influence on several early vallenato figures including Alejo Durán, Pacho Rada, and Emiliano Zuleta. He is credited with being the first person to have been able to play all four vallenato styles (or "airs") of puya, paseo, merengue, and son.

== Biography ==
Chico Bolaño was born in 1902 in El Molino, in the Colombian department of La Guajira. As a young man he moved to Fundación, where he started working as a musician. He made his living travelling between towns in the Colombian Caribbean and performing at parties.

Bolaño is cited as an influence by several early vallenato figures including Alejo Durán, Pacho Rada, Emiliano Zuleta, and Lorenzo Morales. He died in 1962 in Bosconia, at the age of 59.

== Musical style and compositions ==
Bolaño is believed to be the first person to have been able to play all four vallenato airs of puya, paseo, merengue, and son. His best-known composition is "Catalina Daza", which has been recorded by artists including Lorenzo Morales, Iván Villazón, and Chema Ramos. He wrote the vallenato "Sánchez Cerro", named after Peruvian president Luis Miguel Sánchez Cerro, in support of Colombia during the Colombia–Peru War. His merengue "Chulavita" was written about la Violencia.
