= Camila Zárate =

Colombian actress

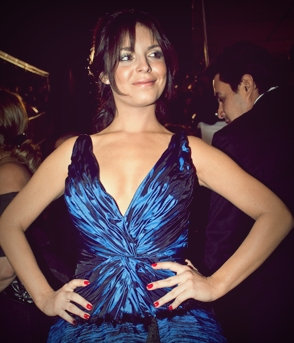
Camila Zárate

María Camila Zárate Mahecha (Bogotá, July 11, 1987) is a Colombian actress who debuted in El penúltimo beso. She also participated in telenovelas like Chepe Fortuna and Rafael Orozco, el ídolo. In 2013 she starred with Marianela Gonzalez on soap opera Sweet love on Caracol TV.

== Biography ==
Camila was born in Bogotá, Colombia, on July 11, 1987. She started her career on Colombian television.

At 18 she began working as Locutura on major radio stations such as Top 40, (The Mega) and later as host of The Notebook of Channel 13 and Nickneim and hake Zone of City Tv. She debuted in 2009 as an actress in The penultimate kiss, where she got her first starring role with Noelia Fernández Santamaría.

On Chepe Fortuna, she played the ambitious Herlinda Fortuna. Initially she was cast as the title role, but Camila rejected the proposal because she wanted to prepare more professionally. Her first international project was with the MTV in the series Popland!. In 2013 she returned as protagonist in the Colombian version of the Argentinian novel Duce Amor where Veronica Toledo plays a very controversial figure.

== Home ==
Her acting career was thanks to the director who chose her to play Herney Moon in El penúltimo beso in 2009 and Noelia, next to Sebastian Martinez.

== Television ==
Year	Film	Role	Notes
2008–2009	el penúltimo beso	Noelia Fernandez	TV series
2010–2011	Chepe Fortuna	Herlinda	
2011	Popland!	Trinidad González Catán "Trini"	
2012	Rafael Orozco, el ídolo	Luisa de Orozco	
2013	Dulce amor	Verónica Toledo	

== See also ==
- Taliana Vargas
- Javier Jattin
- Sebastián Martínez (actor)
