= Elberto López =

Colombian accordionist

- Also known as: El Debe
- Born: Elberto de Jesús López Gutiérrez; 28 December 1950; La Paz, Colombia
- Died: 21 June 2007 (aged 56) Sincelejo, Colombia
- Genres: Vallenato
- Family: Miguel López (brother)

Elberto de Jesús López Gutiérrez (Note: In this Spanish name, the first or paternal surname is López and the second or maternal family name is Gutiérrez.) (1950 – 2007), also known by the nickname El Debe, was a Colombian vallenato accordionist. In 1980 he was crowned vallenato king for winning the professional accordionist competition of the Vallenato Legend Festival.

== Biography ==
López was born on 28 December 1950 in La Paz, in the Colombian department of Cesar (although at that time still in Magdalena). He was one of 14 children of Pablo Rafael López Gutiérrez, and his siblings include the accordionists Miguel, Alfonso, and Silene López, and the caja player Pablo López.

López started playing accordion at the age of 14. In 1980 he won the professional accordionist competition of the Vallenato Legend Festival and was crowned vallenato king (Spanish: rey vallenato). It was his first time performing at the festival, and he was accompanied by Omar Castilla on guacharaca and Efraín López on caja.

Later in his career, López recorded with vallenato singers including Diomedes Díaz, Miguel Herrera, and Freddy Andrade. He had particular success with Díaz, with whom he released the LPs Tres Canciones and De Frente in 1977. He was also a member of the vallenato group Los Hermanos López, alongside Jorge Oñate and his brothers Miguel and Pablo Rafael.

López died on 21 June 2007 in Sincelejo, and was buried the next day in La Paz.
