= Catalina Londoño =

Colombian actress

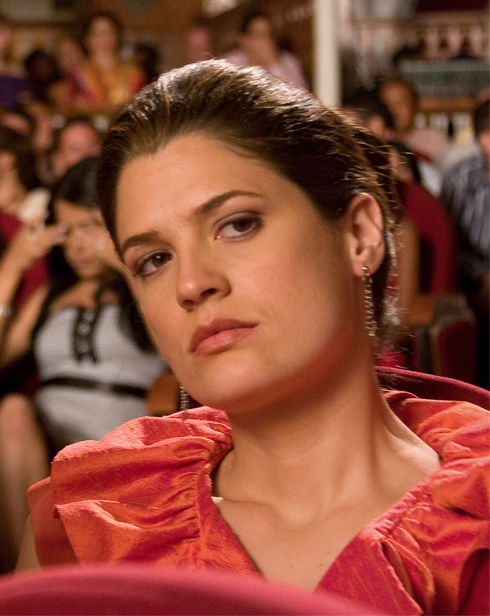
- Londoño in Leccions para un beso.
- Born: July 24, 1980 (age 45); Cartagena, Colombia
- Occupation: Actress

Catalina Londoño (born July 24, 1980 in Cartagena) is a Colombian actress. She is the niece of Florina Lemaitre, another Colombian actress.

== Biography ==
Londoño was interested in acting since high school, where she participated in theater club. She moved to Bogotá in 1998 and started working in modeling. In 2004, she moved to Spain to study acting at Estudio Corazza. She relocated to Colombia again to play Mónica in the film Lecciones para un beso. She replaced actress Mabel Moreno in the television series Chepe Fortuna. She played the protagonist in the Colombian television series Casa de Reinas.

== Filmography ==
=== Television ===
- Garzón vive, 2018
- Los hombres también lloran, 2015
- Chepe Fortuna, 2010
- La Dama de Troya, 2008

=== Cinema ===
- Loving Pablo, 2017
- Lecciones para un beso, 2011
