= El Cocha Molina =

Colombian accordionist

Gonzalo "El Cocha" Molina
- Born: Gonzalo Arturo Molina Mejía; 11 June 1965 (age 60); Patillal, Colombia
- Genres: Vallenato

Gonzalo Arturo Molina Mejía (Note: In this Spanish name, the first or paternal surname is Molina and the second or maternal family name is Mejía.) (born 1965), known as El Cocha Molina or just Cocha Molina, is a Colombian vallenato accordionist. He was crowned vallenato king for winning the accordionist competition of the Vallenato Legend Festival in 1990, and in 1997 he won the king of kings competition. Molina has released several albums with singers including Diomedes Díaz, Iván Villazón, Gloria Estefan, and Jorge Oñate.

== Biography ==
=== Early life and education ===
Gonzalo "El Cocha" Molina was born on 11 June 1965 in Patillal, in the Colombian department of Cesar, to Arturo Molina and Estela Mejía. His father was a guitarist in the conjunto of Jorge Oñate. His nickname "El Cocha" comes from the pet name that his mother used for him.

Molina attended primary school at the Colegio Parroquial in Valledupar, and secondary school at the Colegio Nacional Loperena in Valledupar and the Colegio Chiquinquirá in Bogotá. He studied three semesters of business administration at university, but did not complete his degree. Molina started to learn accordion at the age of 6, on an instrument given to him by his uncle Evaristo Gutiérrez, the father of songwriter Gustavo Gutiérrez Cabello.

=== The Vallenato Legend Festival ===
In 1978, Molina competed in the child accordionist competition of the Vallenato Legend Festival, accompanied by Ovany Gómez on vocals and guacharaca, and Wilder Gómez on caja; he came second behind his cousin Chiche Maestre. He won the amateur accordionist competition of the Festival in 1982.

Molina competed in the professional accordionist competition of the Vallenato Legend Festival in 1989, coming second behind that year's vallenato king Omar Geles. Molina competed again and won in 1990, accompanied by Iván Villazón on vocals and guacharaca, and Augusto Guerra on caja. They performed the paseo "El Pollo Vallenato" (written by Luis E. Martínez), the merengue "Rosita" (also by Martínez), the son "Pena y Dolor" (Alejo Durán), and the puya "Déjala Venir" (Náfer Durán).

In 1997 Molina won the king of kings competition of the Festival, which is only open to past winners of the professional accordionist competition. He defeated Omar Geles (who came second), Chiche Martínez (third), Juan David Herrera, and Freddy Sierra.

=== Collaborations ===
In the 1980s Molina had a successful period of collaboration with singer Diomedes Díaz, and together they released the albums El Mundo (1984), Vallenato (1985), Brindo Con el Alma (1986), and Incontenibles (1987). In 2002, Molina and Díaz released the album Gracias a Dios. Beginning in 1988, Molina began recording with singer Iván Villazón, and together they released the albums Por Ti Valledupar (1988), Enamorado de Ella (1989) and El Amor Canta Vallenato (1990).

In 1995 Molina played on Gloria Estefan's Grammy Award winning album Abriendo Puertas. He released the album Sensacionales with Carlos Malo in 1994, and in 1997 started collaborating with Jorge Oñate, with whom he released the albums El de Todos los Tiempos (1997), Son Universal (1998), El Poder de Mis Canciones (1999), and Llévame Conmigo (2001). In the 2000s Molina began playing with Poncho Zuleta, and together they released the albums Colombia Canta Vallenato (2007), El Nobel del Amor (2010), and Parao en la Raya (2014).
