= Martín Elías =

Colombian singer and entrepreneur

- Born: Martín Elías Díaz Acosta; 18 June 1990; Valledupar, Cesar, Colombia
- Died: 14 April 2017 (aged 26) Sincelejo, Sucre, Colombia
- Genres: Vallenato
- Occupations: Singer, songwriter and composer
- Instrument: Singing
- Years active: 2002–2017

Martín Elías Díaz Acosta (June 18, 1990 – April 14, 2017), better known as "el Gran Martín Elías", was a Colombian vallenato singer and entrepreneur, son of the singer and composer Diomedes Díaz. He was considered a pioneer of the 'new wave' of vallenato music.

== Discography ==
- Una nueva historia (2007)
- Marcando la diferencia (2008)
- Cosa de Locos (2009)
- El terremoto musical (2011)
- Homenaje a los más grandes del vallenato (2011)
- El boom del momento (2012)
- La historia continua (2014)
- Imparables (2015)
- Entre Díaz y canciones (2015)
- Homenaje a los grandes Volumen II (2016)
