= Almes Granados =

Colombian accordionist

- Born: Almes Guillermo Granados Melo; 1958 or 1959 (age 67–68); Valledupar, Colombia
- Genre: Vallenato

Almes Guillermo Granados Melo (Note: In this Spanish name, the first or paternal surname is Granados and the second or maternal family name is Melo.) (born 1958 or 1959) is a Colombian vallenato accordionist. He was crowned vallenato king for winning the accordionist competition of the Vallenato Legend Festival in 2011, and in 2022 he won the king of kings competition.

== Biography ==
Almes Guillermo Granados Melo was born in 1958 or 1959 in the Mariangola neighbourhood of Valledupar, in the Colombian department of Cesar (but at that time still in Magdalena). He started playing accordion in his early twenties, while working in the workshop of his brother Ovidio Granados.

Granados won the accordionist competition of the 2011 Vallenato Legend Festival, accompanied by Reynaldo Ortiz on guacharaca and his brother Adelmo Granados on caja. He performed the merengue "El Malherido" (written by Leandro Díaz), the paseo "El Pobrecito" (Ovidio Granados), the puya "Los Parecidos" (Andrés Emilio Beleño) and the son "El Soncito" (Calixto Ochoa). In the years following his win, Granados accompanied several vallenato singers on the accordion, including Lucy Vidal and Ivo Díaz.

In 2022 Granados won the king of kings competition of the Vallenato Legend Festival, which is held every 5 years and is only open to accordionists who have previously been crowned king. He was accompanied by José Dolores Bornacelli on guacharaca, and again by his brother Adelmo on caja. In the competition Granados performed two songs written by his brother Ovidio, as well as a composition of his own and the puya "Dejala Vení" by Náfer Durán.
