= San Diego, Cesar =

Coordinates: 10.3375°N 73.1825°W

- Town
- Flag

- Location of the municipality and town of San Diego in the Department of Cesar.
- Country: Colombia
- Region: Caribbean
- Department: Cesar

Government
  - Mayor: Juan Enrique Mendoza (Alas Equipo Colombia)

Area
  - Total: 687 km^{2} (265 sq mi)

Population (Census 2018)
  - Total: 18,531
  - Density: 27.0/km^{2} (69.9/sq mi)
- Time zone: UTC-5
- Website: alcaldiasandiego.com

San Diego is a town and municipality in the Colombian Department of Cesar. It was founded on 19 July 1609.

== Climate ==
Climate data for San Diego (Rincon El), elevation 350 m (1,150 ft), (1981–2010)
Month	Jan	Feb	Mar	Apr	May	Jun	Jul	Aug	Sep	Oct	Nov	Dec	Year
Mean daily maximum °C (°F)	33.4 (92.1)	34.3 (93.7)	34.4 (93.9)	33.4 (92.1)	32.0 (89.6)	32.1 (89.8)	32.7 (90.9)	32.5 (90.5)	31.7 (89.1)	30.9 (87.6)	31.1 (88.0)	32.1 (89.8)	32.6 (90.7)
Daily mean °C (°F)	26.1 (79.0)	26.9 (80.4)	27.4 (81.3)	27.2 (81.0)	26.6 (79.9)	26.5 (79.7)	26.8 (80.2)	26.7 (80.1)	26.1 (79.0)	25.7 (78.3)	25.6 (78.1)	25.6 (78.1)	26.4 (79.5)
Mean daily minimum °C (°F)	18.4 (65.1)	19.2 (66.6)	20.2 (68.4)	20.9 (69.6)	21.1 (70.0)	20.8 (69.4)	20.5 (68.9)	20.6 (69.1)	20.4 (68.7)	20.5 (68.9)	20.0 (68.0)	19.0 (66.2)	20.1 (68.2)
Average precipitation mm (inches)	13.1 (0.52)	35.6 (1.40)	52.6 (2.07)	147.8 (5.82)	201.5 (7.93)	126.1 (4.96)	105.1 (4.14)	139.4 (5.49)	158.2 (6.23)	203.6 (8.02)	133.4 (5.25)	34.7 (1.37)	1,351 (53.19)
Average precipitation days	2	3	6	13	18	16	14	18	18	19	13	4	141
Average relative humidity (%)	72	70	69	73	79	80	76	77	80	81	80	77	76
Source: Instituto de Hidrologia Meteorologia y Estudios Ambientales
