= Jorge Celedón =

Colombian vallenato musician (born 1968)

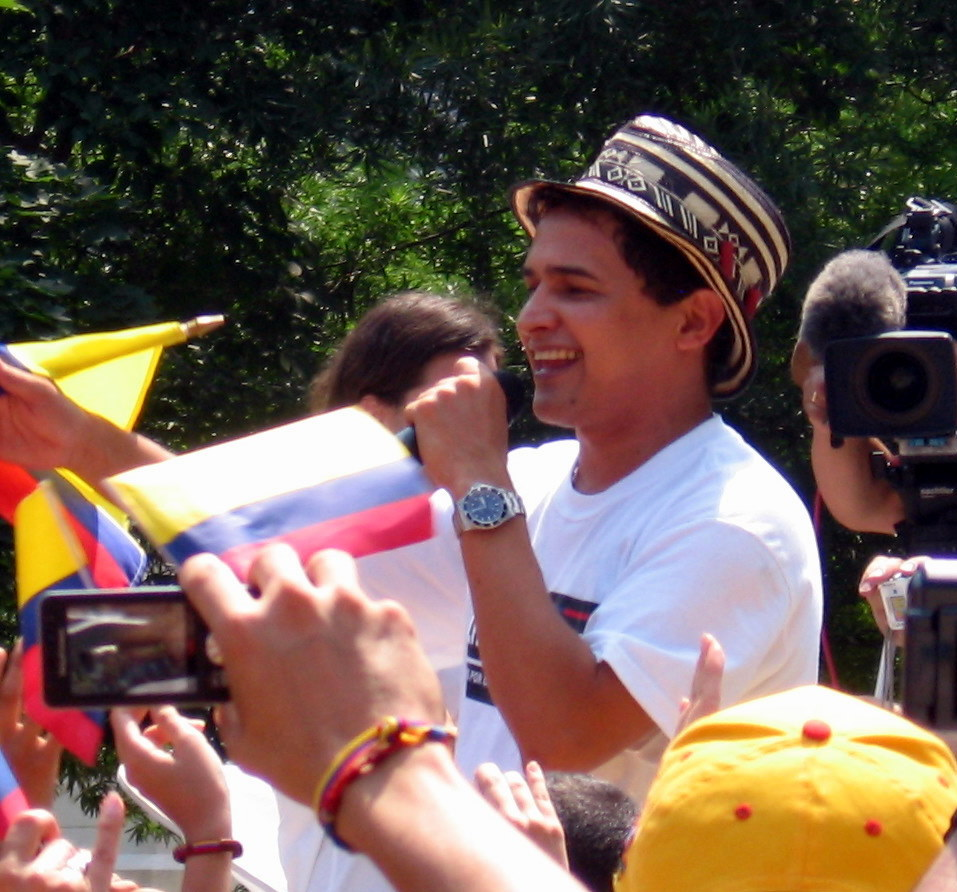
- Jorge Celedón singing at Lafayette Park in Washington, D.C. during the Colombian Independence Day celebration in 2008.

Background information
- Also known as: Jorgito Celedon
- Born: March 4, 1968 (age 58)
- Origin: Villanueva, La Guajira, Colombia
- Genre: Vallenato
- Instrument: singing
- Years active: 1993–Present
- Label: Sony Music
- Formerly of: Binomio de Oro de América
- Website: www.jorgitoceledon.com

Jorge Celedón also known as Jorgito Celedón is a Colombian musician and singer of vallenato music. Celedón was one of the backup singers for the vallenato group Binomio de Oro de America who joined after the death of Rafael Orozco Maestre. In 1998, he decided to create his own vallenato group and teamed with accordionist Jimmy Zambrano.

== Early life ==
Celedon grew up singing vallenato making him a very good singer. His first performance was with his uncle Daniel Celedón in his own group called Doble Poder (Double Power). This helped him to become a great star of vallenato by the time he was an adult.

== Latin Grammy ==
Celedon and his vallenato group were nominated for the Latin Grammy Awards on August 29 2007 in Miami. At the 8th Annual Latin Grammy Awards ceremony held on November 8 2007 in Las Vegas, United States, Celedón and accordionist Jimmy Zambrano received the award in the category Cumbia/Vallenato for their album Son... Para El Mundo (Sony BMG Music/North) . In July 2008, he performed in front of president George W. Bush at an event at the White House in celebration of Colombian independence day.

== Discography ==
Binomio de Oro de América

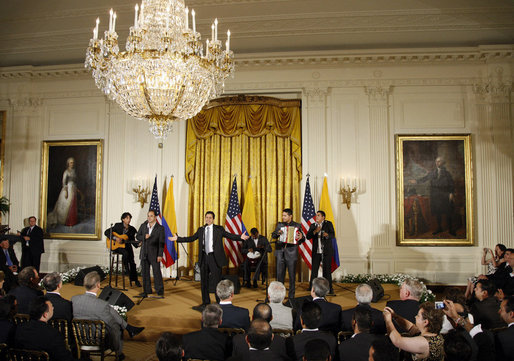
Jorge Celedón, Jimmy Zambrano, and their performance group perform during the celebration of Colombian Independence Day Tuesday, July 22 2008, in the East Room of the White House.

Jorgito Celedón becomes a lead singer

- 1996 - A su Gusto
- 1997 - Seguimos por lo Alto
- 1998 - 2000

=== With Jimmy Zambrano ===
- 2001 - Romántico Como Yo
- 2002 - Llevame en Tus Sueños
- 2003 - Canto Vallenato
- 2004 - Nuevas Canciones del Alma
- 2004 - ¡Juepa je!
- 2006 - Son Para el Mundo
- 2009 - La invitacion
- 2011 - "Lo que tú necesitas"
- 2013 - "Celedón Sin Fronteras Vol 1"(Shared album with Gustavo García)
- 2014 - "Celedón Sin Fronteras Vol 2"(Shared album with Gustavo García)

=== With Gustavo García ===
- 2014 - "Sencillamente"

=== With Sergio Luis Rodríguez ===
- 2017 - "Ni un paso atrás"
- 2020 - "Sigo cantando al amor"

== Awards and nominations ==
=== Latin Grammy Awards ===
A Latin Grammy Award is an accolade by the Latin Academy of Recording Arts & Sciences to recognize outstanding achievement in the music industry. Jorge Celedón has received the award four times from six nominations.

Year	Nominee / work	Award	Result
2006	Grandes Exitos En Vivo	Best Cumbia/Vallenato Album	Nominated
2007	Son...Para El Mundo	Best Cumbia/Vallenato Album	Won
2008	"Me Vio Llorar"	Best Tropical Song	Nominated
2012	Lo Que Tú Necesitas	Best Cumbia/Vallenato Album	Nominated
2014	Celedón Sin Fronteras, Vol. 1	Best Cumbia/Vallenato Album	Won
2015	Sencillamente	Best Cumbia/Vallenato Album	Won
2017	Ni Un Paso Atrás	Best Cumbia/Vallenato Album	Won
2020	Sigo Cantando al Amor (Deluxe)	Best Cumbia/Vallenato Album	Won

=== Premios Nuestra Tierra ===
A Premio Nuestra Tierra is an accolade that recognizes outstanding achievement in the Colombian music industry. Jorge Celedón has received four nominations.

Year	Nominee / work	Award	Result
2014	Celedón Sin Fronteras, Vol.1	Album of the Year	Nominated
2014	Himself	Best Vallenato Artist or Group	Nominated
2014	"La Candela Viva" (with Totó la Momposina)	Best Folk Performance of the Year	Nominated
2014	Himself	Tweeter of the Year	Nominated

== See also ==
- Binomio de Oro de America
