= Binomio de Oro de América =

Colombian vallenato band

- Origin: Colombia
- Genre: Vallenato
- Years active: 1976 - Present
- Members: Israel Romero (accordion); Samir Vencer Romero (accordion); Israel David Romero (singer); Deiner Bayona (singer); Jean Piero Spano (Singer); Polacho Soto (bass guitar); Ivan Pumarejo (guitar); John Jairo Hernandez (keys); Lesme Ortiz(timbales); Armando Castro (caja vallenata); Jesús Campiño (guacharaca); Misael Romero (congas & effects); Rafael Romero (congas & effects)
- Past members: Rafael Orozco; Gabriel ''Gaby'' Garcia; Richard Salcedo; Jean Carlos Centeno; Jorge Celedón; Junior Santiago; Alejandro Palacio; Orlando Acosta; Didier Moreno; Duban Bayona; Jhonatan Jaraba; Jose Fernando Romero; Marcos Bedoya; Carlos Humberto López

Binomio de Oro de América is a Colombian Vallenato group that was founded by lead singer Rafael Orozco and accordionist Israel Romero in the Caribbean Region of Colombia on June 16, 1976. The group grew up in popularity in the 1980s and 1990s and developed mainstream popularity in Venezuela, especially in the city of Maracaibo and in Mexico, mainly in the city of Monterrey.

== Early years ==
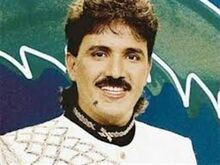
Rafael Orozco, the founder singer of the Binomio de Oro de América band, before was killed

The group was officially created by vallenato singer Rafael Orozco and accordionist Israel Romero on June 16, 1976. Both Orozco and Romero were students attending university classes in the city of Barranquilla. Romero had just recorded a Long Play with singer Emilio Oviedo, with strong influences from singer Jorge Oñate, the Lopez brothers, accordionist Colacho Mendoza and the Los Hermanos Zuleta who were the mainstream vallenato groups at the moment. Romero had been successful with the hit songs "Amanecemos Parrandeando" and "Digan lo que digan". Orozco had just recorded the songs "Cariñito de mi vida" by Diomedes Diaz, "Presentimiento" and "Adelante".

The group recorded the long play "Binomio de Oro (album)" in 1977.

== After Orozco ==
After the assassination of Orozco, Romero took the group under his management. He was able to maintain the group's popularity by hiring young talents and maintaining always a new style. Romero first hired Gabriel "El Gaby" García who was physically very similar to Orozco and impersonated him, the chorus was Jean Carlos Centeno and the other was Richard Salcedo, as well as his accordionist nephew JF "El Morre" Romero. Their debut was in Venezuela in a national popular TV show contest "Premio Orquidea" which they won that year. Binomio de Oro then recorded the first album without Orozco titled "Todo Corazón (album)" featuring Romero siting along an empty chair implying that his partner was irreplaceable. The album also featured a song by Rafael Orozco titled "Solo para ti" which became an all time hit.

In 1996 Jean Carlos Centeno and Jorgito Celedon became lead singers of the Binomio de Oro along with Romero as accordionist and his nephew after Garcia's departure. In 1999 singer Jorgito Celedon quit the group to pursue a solo career and was replaced by Junior Santiago. Later Junior Santiago and "Morre" Romero separated from the group to form their own vallenato group.

In 2012, Binomio de Oro de América member Alejandro Palacio was chosen to star in Rafael Orozco, el ídolo, a Colombian biographical telenovela produced by Asier Aguilar Amuchastegui for Caracol Televisión, as the titular character. Based on the life of the Colombian singer of vallenato Rafael Orozco Maestre. Alejandro Palacio had stated many times that Rafael Orozco Maestre was his idol as he was growing up. The series follows the life of Maestre in his romantic moments and why he was killed.

== Discography ==
From 1977 to 1991 the Binomio de Oro recorded 20 albums not counting special contributions to other artist of the "Fiesta Vallenata" compilations, interrupted with the death of lead singer Rafael Orozco.

- 1977 - El Binomio de Oro
- 1977 - Por lo Alto
- 1978 - Enamorado como Siempre
- 1978 - Los Elegidos
- 1979 - Super Vallenato
- 1980 - Clase aparte
- 1980 - De Cache
- 1981 - 5 Años de Oro
- 1982 - Festival Vallenato
- 1982 - Fuera de Serie
- 1983 - Mucha Calidad
- 1984 - Somos Vallenato
- 1985 - Superior
- 1986 - El Binomio de Oro 1986
- 1987 - En Concierto
- 1988 - Internacional
- 1989 - De Exportación
- 1990 - De Fiesta con el Binomio
- 1991 - Por Siempre
- 1991 - De América

Singer Gabriel "El Gaby" García replaced Orozco.

- 1993 - Todo Corazón
- 1994 - De la Mano con el Pueblo
- 1995 - Lo Nuestro

Jean Carlos Centeno and Jorgito Celedon became lead singers.

- 1996 - A su Gusto
- 1997 - Seguimos por lo Alto
- 1998 - 2000

In 1999 singer Jorgito Celedon quits the group, replaced by Junior Santiago.

- 1999 - Mas Cerca de tí
- 2000 - Difícil de Igualar
- 2001 - Haciendo Historia
- 2003 - Que Viva el Vallenato
- 2004 - En todo su Esplendor
- 2005 - Grafiti de Amor
- 2006 - Impredecible

== Awards and nominations ==
=== Latin Grammy Awards ===
A Latin Grammy Award is an accolade by the Latin Academy of Recording Arts & Sciences to recognize outstanding achievement in the music industry. El Binomio de Oro de América has received four nominations..

Year	Nominee / work	Award	Result
2006	Grafiti de Amor	Best Cumbia/Vallenato Album	Nominated
2007	Impredecible	Best Cumbia/Vallenato Album	Nominated
2010	Vuelve y pica...El Pollo	Best Cumbia/Vallenato Album	Nominated
2011	Corazón de Miel	Best Cumbia/Vallenato Album	Nominated
