= Juancho Rois =

Colombian musician

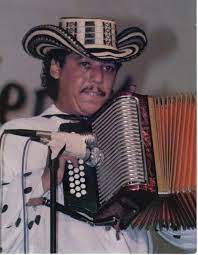
- Born: Juan Humberto Rois Zúñiga; December 25, 1958; San Juan del Cesar, Colombia
- Died: November 21, 1994 (aged 35); Anzoategui, Republic of Venezuela
- Occupations: Vallenato Musician; Accordionist; Composer

Juan Humberto Rois Zúñiga (December 25, 1958 – November 21, 1994, popularly known as Juancho Rois and nicknamed El Conejo (the rabbit) was a Colombian vallenato musician, accordionist, and composer.

He was born on December 25, 1958, in San Juan del Cesar, La Guajira and died on November 21, 1994, in a plane crash in the city of El Tigre, Anzoátegui, Venezuela.

== See also ==
- Vallenato Legend Festival
- Diomedes Díaz
