= Rafael Orozco Maestre =

Colombian vallenato singer (1954–1992)

- Born: Rafael José Orozco Maestre; March 24, 1954
- Origin: Becerril, Cesar; Colombia
- Died: June 11, 1992 (aged 38)
- Genres: Vallenato, Latin
- Occupation: singer
- Instruments: Singing
- Years active: 1976–1992
- Label: Codiscos

Rafael José Orozco Maestre (March 24, 1954 – June 11, 1992) was a Colombian singer of vallenato music. He was one of the major representatives of Colombian popular folk music and was lead singer and co-founder, alongside fellow accordionist Israel Romero, of the vallenato group Binomio de Oro de América, which was very popular in Colombia, Mexico and Venezuela.

Orozco was born in Becerril, Cesar. He was assassinated by gunmen in front of his house in Barranquilla, Atlántico, during his daughter's 15th birthday party (quinceañera). It is believed the assassins were hired by a drug lord whose wife or girlfriend was obsessed with Orozco. It has been alleged that Orozco had a sentimental relationship with a young woman named Maria Angelica Navarro Ogliasti, identified as the girlfriend of Medellin Cartel hitman Jose Reinaldo Fiallo, who was himself murdered in November 1992 on orders of Pablo Escobar.

== Biography ==
=== Early years ===
Orozco grew up in the small town of Becerril close to Valledupar. As a child he sold water that he collected in the Maracas River together with his donkey "El Ñato". He initially wanted to be an accordionist like his father. He attended High School at the Colegio Nacional Loperena in Valledupar.

=== Career ===
In 1975 after High School, he recorded two albums with accordion player Emilio Oviedo. The title of her first album was Adelante and The second one was named Con entusiasmo.

In 1976, he met accordion player Israel Romero at a party and they became friends. Two months later they founded the musical group Binomio de Oro de América, with this group they won three Congos de Oro at the Barranquilla's Carnival, 16 gold records and two platinum records for millionaire sales worldwide.

In 1991, Orozco wrote the song Solo Para Ti, dedicated to his wife, a song that would be an international success.

== Personal life ==
Rafael Orozco Maestre married Clara Elena Cabello Sarmiento in the church of Santa Bernardita in Barranquilla, on March 5, 1976. They had three daughters, Kelly Johanna, Wendy Giolanny and Loraine. He studied several semesters of Business Administration at the Caribbean Autonomous University before dedicating himself to music.

== Discography ==
From 1977 to 1991 the Binomio de Oro recorded 20 albums not counting special contributions to other artist on different compilations, interrupted with the death of lead singer Rafael Orozco.

- 1977 - Binomio de Oro (1977 album)
- 1977 - Por lo Alto
- 1978 - Enamorado como Siempre
- 1978 - Los Elegidos (album)
- 1979 - Super Vallenato
- 1980 - Clase Aparte (album)
- 1980 - De Cache
- 1981 - 5 Años de Oro
- 1982 - Festival Vallenato (album)
- 1982 - Fuera de Serie (album)
- 1983 - Mucha Calidad (album)
- 1984 - Somos Vallenato
- 1985 - Superior (vallenato album)
- 1986 - Binomio de Oro (1986 album)
- 1987 - En Concierto (vallenato album)
- 1988 - Internacional (vallenato album)
- 1989 - De Exportación
- 1990 - De Fiesta con el Binomio
- 1991 - Por Siempre (vallenato album)
- 1991 - De América

== Telenovela ==
In 2014, Caracol TV, the largest Colombian television station, started airing a telenovela titled Rafael Orozco, el ídolo, about the life of Rafael Orozco Maestre.
