= Diomedes Díaz =

Colombian vallenato artist (1957–2013)

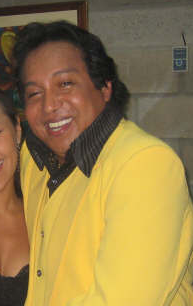
- Díaz in 2006

Background information
- Also known as: El Cacique de La Junta (The Chieftain of La Junta); King of Vallenato “El Papá de Los Pollitos”
- Born: Diomedes Díaz Maestre; 26 May 1957; San Juan del Cesar, La Guajira, Colombia
- Died: 22 December 2013 (aged 56) Valledupar, Cesar, Colombia
- Genres: Vallenato, Latin, dance-pop
- Occupations: Singer, songwriter and composer
- Instruments: Singing
- Years active: 1976–2013
- Label: Sony Music
- Spouse: Patricia Acosta (m- 1978-1994) Betsy Liliana Gonzalez “La Doctora” (1994-2008) Consuelo Martínez (2008-2013)
- Award: Latin Grammy (2010) Género: Cumbia/Vallenato Album: “Listo Pa' La Foto”

Diomedes Díaz Maestre (26 May 1957 – 22 December 2013) was a Colombian vallenato singer and composer. He has been named the "King of Vallenato" and is nicknamed El Cacique de La Junta (The Chieftain of La Junta), which was given to him by another vallenato singer, Rafael Orozco Maestre, in honor of Díaz's birthplace. Diomedes is the greatest Colombian singer-songwriter of vallenato music and the biggest seller of records in that musical genre, surpassing 20 million copies.

Diomedes Díaz is the biggest record seller in the history of vallenato, exceeding 20 million throughout his career. Due to this, he was awarded gold, platinum and diamond records, unique in Colombia until 2008. In 2010 he won the Latin Grammy in the "Cumbia / Vallenato category". Loved and idolized by many, Diomedes' followers adopted the nickname "diomedistas", while Diomedes called them his "fanaticada".

His personal life was marked by family instability, controversial friendships, ups and downs with the consumption of alcohol and drugs, accidents, financial and legal problems, especially the death under strange circumstances of Doris Adriana Niño.

== Biography ==
=== First Years ===
Diomedes Díaz was born and raised on a farm called "Carrizal" on the outskirts of La Junta Township that belongs to the Municipality of San Juan del Cesar, La Guajira. His father, Rafael María Díaz, and his mother, Elvira Maestre, were poor. His childhood was spent helping his parents and eight brothers with farm duties, while he was musically influenced by his locally renowned uncle, Martín Elías.

=== First compositions ===
According to the journalist Alberto Salcedo Ramos, when Diomedes was a child, he acted as a scarecrow to protect the cornfields from birds and, to avoid getting bored, he sang and exchanged songs as a barter with indigenous people from the neighboring farm in exchange for coffee.

Diomedes' first love, a young woman named Helida, was the one who inspired him to compose his first songs. Diomedes was also trying to dabble in singing, but by way of derision, he obtained the nickname "El chivato" (the little goat) for his voice during puberty. He also learned to play the guacharaca and sing verses. Eventually, his uncle decided to help him train his voice and compose songs; Diomedes mastered his vocal training and was invited to perform at parties. From Carrizal, he was taken to Villanueva to study in elementary school at the "Liceo Colombia". During his stay in Villanueva, a childhood friend accidentally stoned him in the right eye while trying to get mangoes from a tree, he lost sight in the affected eye.

Diomedes worked as a gardener to help with his livelihood, and then, dropped out of his studies to be a messenger for the Radio Guatapurí station with Manuel Pineda Bastidas being the manager, who gave him a bicycle to run errands for him, but Diomedes never learned to use it. He alternated his job with his studies at the "Colegio Nacional Loperena", night shift, where he finished the penultimate grade.

Diomedes' intention of working at Radio Guatapurí was, once inside, to make friends with the announcers and Disc jockeys so that they could play the album that contained his song "La negra", which had recently been recorded by Luciano Poveda and Jorge Quiroz. Diomedes stayed on Radio Guatapurí for eight months, but due to delaying running errands because of not knowing how to ride the bicycle, he was dismissed.

From his friendship with Rafael Orozco, came the recording of the song "Cariñito de mi vida", which consolidated Diomedes as a composer and Orozco as a singer along with the accordionist Emilio Oviedo. Through a greeting in the song "Cariñito de mi vida", Rafael Orozco coined and immortalized Diomedes the nickname "El Cacique de La Junta".

Diomedes continued exercising several trades, but always trying to interact with vallenato artists, even working as a prop, picking up wires and adjusting the sound of the microphones of "Los Hermanos López group". On the advice of his uncle Martín, Diomedes began to dabble in singing. The accordionist of "Los Hermanos López", Elberto López also allowed Diomedes to sing the last songs of their live performances. In 1975, Jorge Oñate and Colacho Mendoza recorded the song "Razón Sentimental" for him on the album "Los dos amigos".

=== Participation in "Festival de la Leyenda Vallenata" (1975) ===
In 1975, Diomedes participated in the contest "King of unreleased song" of the vallenato legend festival occupying third place with his song "Hijo agradecido". The concourse was won by Julio Oñate Martínez with the theme "La Profecía". This festival took place between 26 and 30 April.

According to his friend Jaime Hinojosa Daza, Diomedes was going through financial difficulties and sold a bundle of lemons in the Valledupar market to buy a cassette and with a borrowed recorder he composed the song. The cassette was presented to the organizers of the contest, then he left to Carrizal because he did not have money to stay in Valledupar, so he heard the results of the competition through Radio Guatapurí, so he knew that they gave him third place. The next morning he went to Valledupar to claim the award. His then-girlfriend "la Negra" Sarmiento kept the trophy they gave him as a prize, which she still keeps.

The same year, Jorge Oñate and Colacho Mendoza recorded Diomedes' composition called "Razón profunda" on the album "Únicos".

In the "Rey Vallenato Professional Accordion" category, the accordion player Nafer Durán was the winner, who contacted Diomedes, through the then artistic director of Codiscos Emilio Oviedo, to make a recording together.

=== Nafer Durán (1975) ===
One month after the Vallenato Festival, Diomedes and Náfer Durán with his accordion recorded in Medellín the LP Herencia vallenata under the Codiscos label, album that included the song of Diomedes' authorship "El Chanchullito", composed for his sentimental partner Patricia Acosta.

Durán included three songs made by him, "Pobre negro", "Teresita" and "La invitación". Although this musical production did not have too much success, it served to make Diomedes known as a singer. In those years, the vallenato music market was dominated by Jorge Oñate, Los Hermanos López and Los Hermanos Zuleta.

=== Elberto "El Debe" López (1976-1977) ===
Then with "El Debe" López, they recorded the LP's "Tres canciones" in 1976, and "De frente" in 1977. Diomedes initially traveled from Valledupar to Bogota, where the producer Gabriel Muñoz of CBS (now Sony Music) made him a six minutes audition with the theme "Cristina Isabel", and when he noticed Diomedes' talent, decided to contract him.

For the album "Tres canciones" Diomedes included two of his songs, "Celos con rabia" and "Tres canciones".

Regarding the LP "De frente", Díaz included two songs composed by him, "La pollita" and "Mi profecía".

In 1977, Diomedes hired Dagoberto Suárez as his manager, who would remain in the group until 1985. This same year, Juan Piña and accordion player Juancho Rois recorded the album "El fuete", in which they included Diomedes' song "La morriña". Jorge Oñate and "Colacho" Mendoza also recorded compositions from him; the song "Noble corazón" on the album "SIlencio" and the song "Mañana primaveral" on the LP titled "En la cumbre".

=== Juancho Rois (1978) ===
Diomedes Díaz would achieve recognition in 1978 with the album "La locura", which he recorded with accordion player Juancho Rois, also native from the municipality of San Juan del Cesar.

Diomedes recorded two songs from his authorship; "El alma en un acordeón" and "La carta"; they also included a song written by his uncle Martín Maestre entitled "Me mata el dolor".

According to El Heraldo, this album with Juancho Rois was one of the successes of his musical career. Despite the success they achieved with this album, Juancho Rois was bothered by Diomedes' personality and there were personal differences within the group, so Rois decided to leave.

=== "Colacho" Mendoza (1978-1984) ===
Diomedes would consolidate his regional success with accordion players such as Nicolás "Colacho" Mendoza, and then towards the interior of Colombia in the early 1980s, especially due to the deployment that his record label gave them, CBS which included commercials on the national chain. By this time, in Bogota had already consolidated Binomio de Oro, made up of his friend Rafael Orozco and the accordion player Israel Romero, so there started a competition in the market with them. The union of Diomedes with "Colacho" occurred after a proposal from Diomedes, in which the manager Dagoberto Suárez intervened, who contacted the musician during a party in the south of La Guajira.

The first album by Diomedes and "Colacho" was "Dos grandes" which was released in 1978. Diomedes included a song of his authorship entitled "Despedida de soltero". The song "El gavilán mayor" was recorded by Diomedes to honor his friend Raúl Gómez Castrillón, alias "Gavilán Mayor", who was one of the first marijuana traffickers or "marimberos" that the North Coast of Colombia had.

The following year, in 1979, Diomedes and "Colacho" recorded the album "Los Profesionales", which included the song "El limoncito" by Martín Maestre; Diomedes included two songs of his authorship, "El profesional" and "El 9 de abril". This same year, Diomedes and Colacho made their first appearances on "El Show de Jimmy" on Do Re Creativa TV, returning to the program in 1980.

The third musical production with "Colacho" was published in 1980 and titled "Para mi fanaticada". Diomedes included his songs "Para mi fanaticada" and "Mi casa risueña". According to El Heraldo, this album with Colacho Mendoza was among the successes of Diomedes' musical career.

During the same year, Diomedes and "Colacho" recorded the LP, "Tu serenata" with two songs made by him, "Tu serenata" and "Penas de un hogar".

The album "Con mucho estilo" was recorded in 1981 with a song by Diomedes dedicated to his father Rafael María Díaz entitled "A mi papá" and another called "Bonita" inspired by his wife Patricia Acosta.

In 1982, Diomedes and "Colacho" recorded the album "Todo es para ti", in which Diomedes incorporated two songs of his own, "Te quiero mucho" and "Una de mis canciones".

The following year they recorded the album "Cantando" and Diomedes recorded two songs made by him entitled "Cantando" and "Te necesito", while "Colacho" included the song "Alma enamorada" of his authorship.

Diomedes' last musical production with "Colacho" was "El mundo" in 1984, Diomedes included three songs of his own; "Mi muchacho" inspired by Rafael Santos Díaz, "Señora tristeza" and "La Rasquiñita". Diomedes sent a greeting on the theme "El mundo" to Ricardo Palmera, before he later became the head of the FARC and assumed the alias of "Simón Trinidad ".

=== Gonzalo "Cocha" Molina (1985-1987) ===
After six years of being a musical couple with Colacho Mendoza, in 1985 Diomedes formed a musical group with the accordion player Gonzalo Arturo "El Cocha" Molina. Their first record production together was titled "Vallenato". Diomedes incorporated three of his songs; "Dos claveles", "Camina" and "El gallo y el pollo". This last song was composed by Diomedes in honor of "Cocha Molina".

On 30 August 1985, Diomedes and "El Cocha" received a gold record from CBS Venezuela, for the millionaire sales achieved. The award was given to him during a presentation on "Super Sábado Sensacional", at the Venevisión studios.

The following year, in 1986 Diomedes and "El Cocha" recorded the album "Brindo con el alma", Diomedes recorded three songs of his authorship; "Ayudame a quererte", "Brindo con el alma" and "Sin tí". In the last one, Diomedes sent a greeting to the drug trafficker Samuel Alarcón, a member of the Cartel de la Costa, also in the song "Sin medir distancias" he mentioned his friend, the drug trafficker Felipe Eljach.

In 1987, the musical production "Incontenibles" was recorded, and Diomedes incorporated three themes of his authorship; "Por no perderte", "La excusa" and "Tu cumpleaños". In 2015, the song "Tu cumpleaños" became so popular in Colombia, according to data from the Spotify application, that it was heard more than the traditional Happy Birthday To You song and it became a classic song in birthday celebrations.

=== Juancho Rois (1988–1994) ===
In 1988 Diomedes rejoined the accordionist Juancho Rois and they recorded the album "Ganó el folclor", Diomedes recorded two songs of his authorship; "La batalla" and "Rayito de amor". Diomedes appeared again in "El show de Jimmy" on Do Re Creativa TV and this time alongside Juancho. They would return to promote their albums on the show in a 1989 broadcast.

"El cóndor herido" was recorded in 1989 by Diomedes and "Juancho", including three songs by Diomedes; "El cóndor herido" composed for his wife Patricia Acosta, "El besito" and "Mi compadre".

In 1990 Diomedes and Juancho recorded the album "Canta conmigo" with the song "Lucero espiritual" by Juancho Polo Valencia, Diomedes recorded three songs of his own entitled "Noche de amor", "Las notas de Juancho" and "Adiós lunarcito".

The following year, in 1991, Diomedes and Juancho recorded the musical production entitled "Mi vida musical", Diomedes recorded two of his songs entitled "Mi ahijado" and "Mi vada musical".

The album "El regreso del cóndor" was recorded in 1992 by Diomedes and Juancho, this one included a song of his own entitled "Yo soy el que te quiere", while Diomedes recorded two of his songs called "El regreso del cóndor" y "Mis mejores días".

In 1993 they released the album "Título de amor" with two songs by Diomedes; "Mi primera cana" and "Título de amor"; and Juancho included his song "Dejala". Diomedes and Juancho Rois received a gold record from their Sony Music label for having sold over 600,000 copies of the album Titulo de amor, making it the best-selling musical production by Diomedes and Juancho.

At this time, Diomedes paid $45 million COP (In 1993, one dollar had an average value of 786.54 COP) to a dentist to have a diamond embedded in one of his posterior teeth. The diamond was 4.61 mm by 2.70 mm, 0.39 carats in weight, was imported from India to Colombia and it cost 20 million pesos, a diamond that would become one of Diomedes' most distinctive characteristics. Diomedes had been mocked by announcers, seeing the singer without a tooth on the cover of the album "Tres canciones".

This same year, Diomedes received an honorary degree from the 'Hugues Manuel Lacouture' school located in La Junta, nevertheless, he arrived late to the ceremony when there were no more attendees.

In 1994, Diomedes and Juancho once again generated best-sellers with the album "26 de mayo", exceeding the figure of 150 thousand copies sold and 450 thousand ordered by music stores. Diomedes' own songs were "Buenas tardes", "26 de mayo" and "La doctora". Juancho included his songs "¿Por qué razón?" and "Yo soy Mundial", which was recorded in a tropical rhythm in honor of the Colombian football team during the qualifying rounds for the World Cup in the United States that year.

Diomedes and Juancho managed to fill Madison Square Garden in New York and filled stadiums in Colombia and Venezuela.

The union ended with the untimely death of Juancho Rois on 21 November 1994, in a plane crash in Venezuela while they were on tour, but Diomedes was not in the plane. There are two versions; one that affirms that Diomedes missed the flight and another that the singer did not want to go, because he was invited to a party where some drug traffickers had offered a lot of money to him.

=== Iván Zuleta (1995–1998) ===
After the death of Juancho Rois, Diomedes formed a musical partnership with the young accordionist Iván Zuleta Barros, who was only 18 years old, but belonging to the dynasty of Emiliano Zuleta Baquero, composer Héctor Zuleta Díaz and Los Hermanos Zuleta. With great talent for singing verses and skilled in the accordion, in 1995 Iván Zuleta recorded with Diomedes the album "Un canto celestial" with which he paid tribute to the late Juancho Rois. This album included the songs "Un canto celestial", "Gracias por quererla" made by Diomedes and "No comprendo" by Juancho Rois.

In 1996 they recorded "Muchas gracias". Juancho Rois included his song "Aunque no quieran", while Diomedes included two of his songs; "Muchas gracias" and "Corazón callejero".

In 1997 Diomedes and Zuleta recorded "Mi biografía" with the theme "Entre placer y penas" by Diomedes. At this time Diomedes recorded the song "Ron pa' to' el mundo" with the salsa singer Joe Arroyo for the album Super Bailables del Año under the Sony Music label. In 1997 Diomedes interrupted his musical career due to the scandal that surrounded the death of Doris Adriana Niño, suffered Guillain-Barré disease and was a fugitive from justice.

The album "Volver a vivir" was recorded in 1998 by Diomedes and Zuleta with the themes "Volver a vivir" and "Puro amor" by Diomedes; According to Iván Zuleta, he and Diomedes managed to sell two and a half million copies in their five musical productions, receiving a diamond disc, 35 platinum discs, and 10 platinum sextuple.

=== Franco Argüelles (1999) ===
In 1999, being a fugitive from justice in the case of Doris Adriana Niño, his lawyers, headed by Evelio Daza, succeeded in getting court to temporarily exonerate Diomedes from the security measure, alleging that the singer suffered from Guillain-Barré syndrome. Diomedes was held at his home in Valledupar, rather than a prison cell.

At the end of 1999, Diomedes recorded at his home, the album "Experiencias vividas" with accordionist Franco Argüelles, with a song of his own entitled "Experiencias vividas" and Franco with his composition "Lo que no hago yo". A greeting to Colonel Ciro Hernando Chitiva, Commander of the Police in Cesar caused controversy, due to the judicial problems that Diomedes faced and the effusiveness that the singer showed in a vallenato greeting in the song "Cabeza de hacha" in which he mentioned it " My colonel Ciro Hernando Chitiva. National insignia! ".

In mid-2000, Fiscalía General de la Nación (Prosecutor's office) determined that Diomedes had recovered from the illnesses related to Guillain-Barré syndrome, so he had to return to jail, but before being captured Diomedes escaped. He took refuge in three farms "Las Nubes" and "La Virgen del Carmen" that he owned and in another called "El Limón" owned by his former manager, the businessman and former councilman of Valledupar, Joaquín Guillén. At the time, there were doing strong presence the paramilitary groups under the United Self-Defence Forces of Colombia (AUC), for which it was stated that Diomedes was under the protection of the organization outside the law, also his fans were silent and did not report their sightings of the artist in the region.

=== Cocha Molina (2002) ===
In 2002, Diomedes and "El Cocha" rejoined and recorded the album Gracias a Dios, Diomedes recorded three songs of his own: "Woman of the soul", "Gracias a Dios" and "Consuelo".

=== Juancho de la Espriella (2003) ===
While in prison, in 2003 Diomedes recorded the album Pidiendo via together with accordion player Juancho De la Espriella, who took time apart from his partner Silvestre Dangond to carry out the record production with Diomedes.

Diomedes recorded his voice in a room that they were allowed to use inside the facilities of the Valledupar Penitentiary and Judicial Prison for three days and the recording of the album lasted between two and three months in some studios a few blocks from the jail and was at position of Juancho and the other members of Diomedes' musical group. In the album they included two songs by Diomedes entitled "La mujer mía" and "A mitad del camino".

=== Franco Argüelles (2005) ===
In 2005, Diomedes and Franco Argüelles recorded the album De nuevo con mi gente recorded with two songs by Diomedes; the themes "Siempre serás mi novia" and "El perdón"; a song by Argüelles entitled "El amor de las mujeres".

On 19 November 2005, the Government of Valle del Cauca and the Cali Mayor's Office vetoed Diomedes Díaz after the singer consumed cocaine while he was performing a presentation in the Cali bullring. For his part, Germán Ortegón, Diomedes Díaz's artistic entrepreneur, explained that the alleged bag of cocaine was nothing more than a stamp of the Virgen del Carmen that someone from the public passed to him. The incident was considered as a warning by the local administration to other interpreters. These kinds of scandals were frequent in the artist's life.

On 22 February 2006, in Santa Marta, according to Johnny Bennedetti who hired Diomedes Díaz, the singer did not appear for a presentation, causing disturbances to the point of almost destroying the premises. According to the artist's representative, José Zequeda, the person responsible for the presentation did not make the payment on time as agreed.

=== Iván Zuleta (2007) ===
In 2007 Diomedes returned to record with the accordionist Iván Zuleta, the album was called La voz. Diomedes included two songs of his authorship called "Las vainas de Diomedes" and "No se molesten".

The sudden separation between Diomedes and Zuleta occurred when Iván Zuleta decided to form a musical couple with the singer Iván Villazón, who separated from Saúl Lallemand, which generated the anger of Diomedes and the generation of several verses that caused "Piques" (Improvisation of vallenato verses) between both groups, but in the friendly sense of vallenato folklore. Diomedes joined accordionist Alvarito López. In presentations that the two groups made together, Diomedes called the new duo of Iván Villazón and Iván Zuleta "Los tal-Ivanes ".

=== Álvaro López (2009–2013) ===
In 2009, Diomedes recorded the album Listo pa 'la foto with Alvarito López, which was the winner of the 2010 Latin Grammy Award. Diomedes and Alvarito defeated the other nominees; Omar Geles and Alex Manga with the album Prueba superada; Jorge Oñate and Cristian Camilo Peña with Te dedico mis triunfos; Poncho Zuleta and Cocha Molina with El nobel del amor; and Binomio de Oro of Israel Romero with Vuelve and pica ... el Pollo. The album included the song "Señor maestro" of the authorship of Diomedes Díaz. Also in 2009, Diomedes recorded an album with two CDs entitled Celebremos juntos with various singers and accordion players as a tribute to his musical life.

In 2011, Diomedes and Alvarito recorded the musical production titled "Con mucho gusto", Diomedes included one of his songs, entitled "Amor bogotano". Díaz recorded several tracks in October 2012 for "Fiesta Vallenata", but the album was not released.

Diomedes and Alvaro López recorded again in 2013, publishing the album "La vida del artista". This album, once again, only included one song from Diomedes, called "El hermano Elías". During this year went viral the video of the interview that the journalist Ernesto McCausland made with Diomedes in 1991 about death and the background related to the song of his authorship entitled "Mi ahijado". In the interview Diomedes spoke philosophically about life and death, and prophesied his burial. The video was uploaded to YouTube in 2008 by the journalist, and gradually became massively popular with Internet memes and other parodies in 2013.

A month before dying, Diomedes finished the recording of the album "Entre Díaz y canciones" on 28 November 2013, with the collaboration of his sons Martín Elías and Rafael Santos Díaz, Alvarito López, Juancho De la Espriella, "El Cocha" Molina, Rolando Ochoa and Carlos Huertas Jr. This CD was released under the Sony Music label on 26 May 2015, and reached 20 thousand copies sold at launch.

== Personal life ==
He was born on a farm called Carrizal in the town of La Junta in the municipality of San Juan del Cesar. In the early years of youth and adulthood, his personal life was marked by family instability, controversial friendships, ups and downs with the consumption of alcohol and drugs, accidents, financial and legal problems, especially the death under strange circumstances of Doris Adriana Niño, and health problems. He professed love for his closest children and narrated part of his life through his compositions.

Of humble and peasant extraction, he grew up in poverty and managed to amass a great fortune. He was disinterested in the money he received from his record earnings, royalties from his compositions, the sale of vallenatos greetings on his records, gifts given to him by drug traffickers, wealthy fans, and profits he received from his farms and other investments.

He was generous to his followers and strangers, however, due to food demands for his numerous children, problems and legal breaches, he spent much of his fortune on drugs, alcohol, women and lawyers. There were also people who took advantage of the closeness and trust with Diomedes to get large sums of money from him.

Díaz was a fervent devotee of the Virgen Del Carmen something that he highlighted in his recordings and live performances, he also promised to make her a church, however he died before fulfilling that promise.

=== Family ===
His maternal grandparents were José Maestre and Eufemia Hinojosa.

Diomedes was born on 26 May 1957, in the town of Carrizal, La Guajira, in the home of Rafael María Díaz and Elvira Maestre Hinojosa "Mamá Vila", from whose union ten children were born; five men and five women. His siblings were: Gloria María "Golla", Rafael Gregorio, Avelina del Carmen "Chama", Rosa Leonor "Ocha", Abel Antonio, Elizabeth "Icha", Elver Augusto, Juan Manuel and Elvira Luz.

Diomedes Díaz had romantic relationships with several women, with twelve of whom he had 28 recognised children. The following are the women with whom Diomedes had recognized children:

Couple	Children	Description
Ángela Martina "La negra" Sarmiento	Marena Rocío Díaz Sarmiento	Diomedes' relationship with "La Negra" Sarmiento began in 1969 and they were dating for three years, in adolescence. Marena was Diomedes' first daughter.
Bertha Rosario Mejía Acosta	Rosa Elvira Díaz Mejía	Bertha is Patricia Acosta's cousin. Diomedes and Bertha had Rosa Elvira when Diomedes was 17 years old.
Patricia Acosta (Wife)	Rafael Santos Díaz Diomedes de Jesús Díaz Acosta Luis Ángel Díaz Acosta Martín Elías Díaz Acosta	Diomedes had 17 years of marriage with Patricia Acosta, from 1978 to 1995.
Beatriz Elena Franco	Kelly Elvira Díaz Franco	
Rosmery Rodríguez	Elder Dayán Díaz Rodríguez	
Oscari Guerra	Rafael de Jesús Díaz Guerra	
Denis Aroca	Diomedes Dionisio Díaz Aroca	Diomedes had a fleeting relationship with Denis Aroca. After a party and a meeting at Santos González's house in February 1980, Diomedes and Denis conceived Diomedes Dionisio, who was born on 9 November of that same year.
Yolanda Rincón	Miguel Angel Díaz Rincón	
Alix Ramírez	Rafael María Díaz Ramírez Jose Miguel Díaz Ramírez	
María Niño	Mayra Alejandra Díaz Niño	
Betsy Liliana González "La doctora" (Wife)	Betsy Liliana Díaz González Luis Mariano Díaz González Moisés Díaz González	Diomedes began living with Betsy Liliana just before his divorce of Patricia Acosta. Songs like "Puro amor", and "La doctora", were written by Diomedes to Betsy Liliana.
Luz Consuelo Martínez	Fredy José "El cadete" Díaz Martínez Carmen Consuelo Díaz Martínez Katiuska Díaz Martínez	Luz Consuelo was involved with Diomedes in the case of the death of Doris Adriana Niño. Diomedes was Luz Consuelo's fiancée, but he died before they could get married.

==== Death of Martín Maestre ====
Diomedes was involved in the accident in which his uncle and mentor Martín Maestre died on 1 August 1979. Diomedes was driving a truck that collided with a pile of sand in the middle of the road, in the place where the roundabout would be built with the monument "My piece of Accordion", north of Valledupar. The group of people in the truck came from Patillal where they had been on a celebration. Martín lost his life when he was thrown out of the vehicle and hit the ground with his head violently, while Diomedes and other companions were injured.

In honour of his uncle, Diomedes baptised one of his sons with his name; Martín Elías, who died in a car accident under the same circumstances as his uncle Martin Maestre, both at age 26.

=== Guillain Barré syndrome ===
In April 1998, Diomedes suffered numbness in parts of his body while he was in Bogotá preparing the recording of a musical production. Diomedes was hospitalized and tests showed a positive result for cocaine, but that, this was not related to the diagnosis of the Guillain-Barré syndrome determined by physicians.

Diomedes was treated by the cardiologist Rony López and the physiotherapists Carlina de Pantoja and Antonio Bolaño Mendoza, who applied physical and respiratory therapies, while the recovery process took place in Valledupar where the warm climate helped the treatment.

== Death ==
Diomedes Díaz died in Valledupar on 22 December 2013, due to a cardiorespiratory arrest at 6:15 p.m. when he was resting in his bed. According to Diomedes' partner, Consuelo Martínez, Díaz was sleeping and Consuelo noticed that the artist was not moving, so she called an ambulance and was transferred to a clinic where it was confirmed that his death was due to "natural causes". He was buried in a massive funeral on 25 December at the "Jardines del Ecce Homo" cemetery in Valledupar.

His last public appearance was on 20 December, two days before his death. Diomedes Díaz said goodbye to the year at the Trucupey nightclub in Barranquilla, where he went with his musical group. After his death, several legal disputes began over his inheritance.

== Doris Adriana Niño ==
=== Homicide ===
During the night of 14–15 May 1997, Díaz was having a party in his apartment in Bogotá, when a friend, Doris Adriana Niño, was murdered. According to the Constitutional Court of Colombia, some people at the party, including Niño, consumed drugs, but it is not clear if she was involuntarily forced to take drugs or did so voluntarily. The report says that Niño was raped, and had an argument with a pregnant woman at the party, Luz Consuelo Martínez. Niño died that night, and her body appeared on the outskirts of Bogotá, near the Village of San Onofre, municipality of Combita, (Boyacá Department).

=== Legal proceedings ===
Diomedes Diaz

Díaz was captured by order of the Attorney general's office on 3 October 1997, and was given house arrest after proving he was suffering from Guillain–Barré syndrome. On 11 August 2000, a judge ordered Díaz transferred to jail, considering that his illness had been considerably overcome. When authorities went to his house to complete the transfer, Díaz had escaped and found refuge with an illegal paramilitary group headed by Rodrigo Tovar.

During the trial, Díaz was tried as an "absent inmate"; the judge concluded that Niño had a great amount of drugs the night she died, but the Attorney General's Office determined that her death had been caused by provoked asphyxiation. The Colombian Bureau of Legal Medicine determined that she had died from pressure put over her mouth and nose. On 20 August 2002, after a year and a half of evading house arrest, Díaz turned himself in to authorities in Valledupar, accompanied by two of his lawyers. On 21 August 2002, a Colombian Superior Tribunal reduced his jail term from 144 to 37 months; Niño's family protested that the sentence was too low. He had already spent a year in jail and had two years pending before his escape. According to the trial, Díaz did not commit unintentional homicide (homicidio preterintencional), in which the aggressor wants to induce damage but ends up causing death, as the previous judge had ruled. Instead, it was determined that he had committed involuntary manslaughter (homicidio culposo), which according to Colombian law, is less severe than unintentional homicide.

==== Criticism of trial ====
Doris Adriana Niño's family, especially her brother Rodrigo, criticized the lenient treatment given to Díaz by authorities as he expressed in statements after Díaz turned himself in:

He had to turn himself in, because he got a substantial reduction on his jail time, which came down from 10 years to 37 months. Sincerely, I think that no one is going to do something about it, because that process for escaping from prison is going to preclude ... Díaz had a suspended arrest warrant, had freedom benefits for supposedly being ill, but he wasn't detained. Then they have to be clear on that, we should not be tricked: nothing is going to happen to Mr. Diomedes for his prison escape because basically it never existed... [A]lso, besides that Diomedes has a process for narcotics (Law 30) that he is supposed to follow and be strong, because it is said that the death of Doris Adriana was because of drugs [overdose]. But, I'm convinced that the contrary is going to happen. It is going to preclude.

— Rodrigo Niño,

== Scandals ==
- On 22 November 2005, the local government of Cali vetoed all performances by Díaz in the city after the singer allegedly used cocaine while performing onstage. Although video images proved the contrary, the Cali City Hall gave notice to all entertainment businesses that the government was not going to issue any permits for the use of public areas where Díaz would be scheduled to appear. The incident was considered a warning by the local administration to other performers.
- On 22 February 2006, Díaz was scheduled to sing in the city of Santa Marta. According to the businessman Johnny Bennedetti who hired Díaz, the singer did not show up for the event, causing a mob to almost completely destroy the venue, "La Tremenda". According to Díaz publicist José Sequeda, the people in charge of the event did not deliver on time the full payment as was established in the contract. He said that he had given Diaz part of the money as an initial payment. As a result of the mob, 25 microphones, liquor and money were stolen and sound system equipment was damaged.

== Discography ==
- 1976 Herencia Vallenata, featuring Nafer Durán.
- 1976 Tres Canciones, featuring Elberto López.
- 1977 De Frente, featuring Elberto López.
- 1978 La Locura, featuring Juancho Rois.
- 1979 Dos Grandes, featuring Colacho Mendoza.
- 1979 Los Profesionales, featuring Colacho Mendoza.
- 1980 Tu Serenata, featuring Colacho Mendoza.
- 1980 Para Mi Fanaticada, featuring Colacho Mendoza.
- 1981 Con Mucho Estilo, featuring Colacho Mendoza.
- 1982 Todo es para ti, featuring Colacho Mendoza.
- 1983 Cantando, featuring Colacho Mendoza.
- 1984 El Mundo, featuring Colacho Mendoza.
- 1985 Vallenato, featuring Cocha Molina.
- 1986 Brindo con el Alma, featuring Cocha Molina.
- 1987 Incontenibles, featuring Cocha Molina.
- 1988 Gano el Folclor, featuring Juancho Rois.
- 1989 El Cóndor Herido, featuring Juancho Rois.
- 1990 Canta Conmigo, featuring Juancho Rois.
- 1991 Mi Vida Musical, featuring Juancho Rois.
- 1992 El Regreso del Cóndor, featuring Juancho Rois.
- 1993 Titulo de Amor, featuring Juancho Rois.
- 1994 26 de Mayo, featuring Juancho Rois.
- 1995 Un Canto Celestial, featuring Iván Zuleta.
- 1996 Muchas Gracias, featuring Iván Zuleta.
- 1997 Mi Biografia, featuring Iván Zuleta.
- 1998 Volver a Vivir, featuring Iván Zuleta.
- 1999 Experiencias Vividas, featuring Franco Argüelles.
- 2002 Gracias a Dios, featuring Cocha Molina.
- 2003 Pidiendo Vía, featuring Juan Mario de la Espriella.
- 2005 De Nuevo Con Mi Gente, featuring Franco Argüelles.
- 2007 La Voz, featuring accordion player Iván Zuleta.
- 2009 Celebremos Juntos
- 2009 Listo Pa' la foto
- 2011 Con Mucho Gusto, featuring Alvaro Lopéz
- 2013 La Vida del Artista, featuring Alvaro Lopéz (This was his last album; released a few days before his death).
- 2014 56 años, 56 éxitos, una historia (Posthumous solo project)
- 2015 Entre Díaz y canciones, featuring Martín Elías and Rafael Santos Díaz (Posthumous solo project, accompanied by their sons)

== Awards and nominations ==
=== Latin Grammy Awards ===
Diaz received a Latin Grammy Award and three nominations.

Year	Nominee / work	Award	Result
2009	Celebremos Juntos	Best Cumbia/Vallenato Album	Nominated
2010	Listo Pa' la foto	Best Cumbia/Vallenato Album	Won
2012	Con Mucho Gusto Caray	Best Cumbia/Vallenato Album	Nominated
2014	La Vida del Artista	Best Cumbia/Vallenato Album	Nominated

== See also ==
- List of best-selling Latin music artists
