= Jorge Oñate =

Colombian vallenato singer (1949–2021)

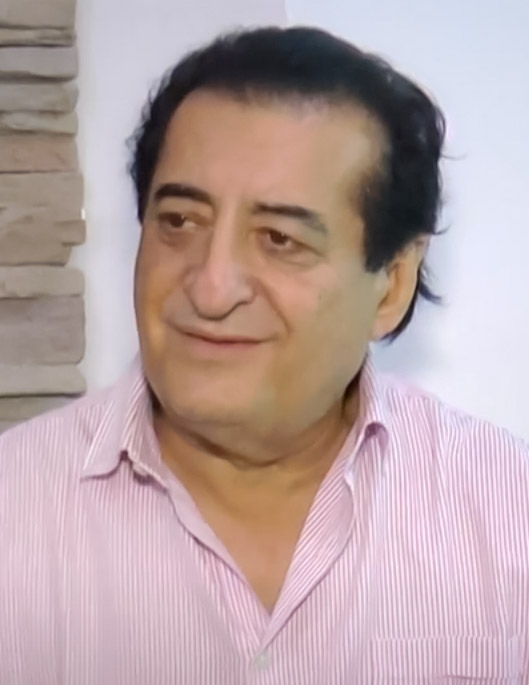

Background information
- Also known as: El Jilguero de America; El Ruiseñor del Cesar
- Born: Jorge Antonio Oñate González; March 31, 1949; Los Robles La Paz, Colombia
- Origin: Los Robles La Paz, Cesar, Colombia
- Died: February 28, 2021 (aged 71) Medellín, Colombia
- Genres: Vallenato, Latin
- Occupation: singer
- Instrument: Singing
- Years active: 1968–2021
- Label: Sony Music
- Website: www.jorgeonate.com

Jorge Antonio Oñate González (31 March 1949 – 28 February 2021) was a Colombian singer and composer, one of the most renowned of the vallenato musical genre. As of 2004 and since the beginning of his career in 1968 he had achieved 25 gold discs, 7 platinum discs and 6 double platinum for his sales, among other numerous musical accomplishments. He had also successfully entered politics as councilor of his hometown, while deputising for Alfredo Cuello Dávila, representing the department of Cesar.

== Biography ==
=== Early years ===
Oñate grew up in the small town of La Paz close to Valledupar where he studied until graduating from high school, he was known for having a great aptitude for singing vallenatos. He was also a football player.

=== Career ===
In 1968 after High School, Oñate was hired by a local vallenato group called "Los Guatapuri" as the lead singer and officially started his career as vallenato singer. The group released an album titled Festival Vallenato. In 1969, he teamed up with the already locally famous Hermanos Lopez vallenato group once again as lead singer, releasing the album Lo Último en Vallenatos!.

In 1970 Oñate released his second album with the Hermanos Lopez titled Diosa Divina while he also recorded an album with accordion player Nelson Diaz, titled Conmigo es el Baile. In 1971 Oñate and Hermanos Lopez recorded the album El Jardincito. In 1972 they released the album Reyes Vallenatos. In 1973 the album El Cantor de Fonseca was released while Las Bodas de Plata appeared in the same year.

In 1974 they recorded another two albums, the first one Fuera de Concurso. The second one was named Rosa Jardinera.

Oñate more lately performed with one of the youngest accordionists in Colombia, Christian Camilo Peña - only 21 years old, he has already achieved a crown of king in the Vallenato Legend Festival celebrated every year in Valledupar. They recorded three albums together: Seguire Triunfando (2004), Vivo Cantando (2005) and Mi Mejor Regalo (2006). In 2010, Oñate was presented with the Latin Grammy Lifetime Achievement Award by the Latin Recording Academy in 2010.

== Personal life ==
Oñate was son of Daniel Gonzalez and Delfina Oñate and was the youngest of three siblings. He married Nancy Zuleta and had three children with her; Jorge Luis, Delfina Ines and Jorge Daniel. He also had another son (also named Jorge) from an extramarital relationship with a woman named Claudia Dangond.

Oñate died of complications related to COVID-19 on 28 February 2021, one month short of his 72nd birthday, during the COVID-19 pandemic in Colombia.

== Discography ==
- 1968 – Festival Vallenato Los Guatapuri feat. Jorge Oñate.
- 1969 – Lo Último en Vallenatos! Los Hermanos Lopez feat. Jorge Oñate.
- 1970 – Diosa Divina Los Hermanos Lopez feat. Jorge Oñate.
- 1970 – Conmigo es el Baile Jorge Oñate feat. accordion player Nelson Diaz.
- 1971 – El Jardincito Los Hermanos Lopez feat. Jorge Oñate.
- 1972 – Reyes Vallenatos Los Hermanos Lopez feat. Jorge Oñate.
- 1973 – El Cantor de Fonseca Los Hermanos Lopez feat. Jorge Oñate.
- 1973 – Las Bodas de Plata Los Hermanos Lopez feat. Jorge Oñate.
- 1974 – Fuera de Concurso Los Hermanos Lopez feat. Jorge Oñate.
- 1974 – Rosa Jardinera Los Hermanos Lopez feat. Jorge Oñate.
- 1975 – Canto a mi Tierra Los Hermanos Lopez feat. Jorge Oñate.
- 1975 – La Parranda y la Mujer Emiliano Zuleta feat. Jorge Oñate.
- 1975 – Los Dos Amigos Jorge Oñate feat. accordion player Colacho Mendoza.
- 1976 – Campesino Parrandero Jorge Oñate feat. accordion player Colacho Mendoza.
- 1977 – Únicos Jorge Oñate feat. accordion player Colacho Mendoza.
- 1978 – Silencio Jorge Oñate feat. accordion player Colacho Mendoza.
- 1978 – En la Cumbre Jorge Oñate feat. accordion player Colacho Mendoza.
- 1978 – El Cambio de mi Vida Jorge Oñate feat. accordion player Raul Martinez.
- 1979 – Siempre Unidos Jorge Oñate feat. accordion player Raul Martinez.
- 1980 – Noche de Estrellas Jorge Oñate feat. accordion player Raul Martinez.
- 1981 – Ruiseñor de mi Valle Jorge Oñate feat. accordion player Juancho Rois.
- 1982 – Paisaje de Sol Jorge Oñate feat. accordion player Juancho Rois.
- 1983 – 13 Aniversario Jorge Oñate feat. accordion player Juancho Rois.
- 1983 – El Cantante Jorge Oñate feat. accordion player Juancho Rois.
- 1984 – Canto y Tradición Jorge Oñate feat. accordion player Juancho Rois.
- 1985 – El Cariño de mi Pueblo Jorge Oñate feat. accordion player Juancho Rois.
- 1986 – Irene Jorge Oñate feat. accordion player Alvaro Lopez.
- 1987 – El Jilguero Jorge Oñate feat. accordion player Alvaro Lopez.
- 1988 – El Folclor se viste de Gala Jorge Oñate feat. accordion player Alvaro Lopez.
- 1989 – Palabras de Amor Jorge Oñate feat. accordion player Alvaro Lopez.
- 1990 – El Más Fuerte Jorge Oñate feat. accordion player Alvaro Lopez.
- 1991 – Mi Mejor Momento Jorge Oñate feat. accordion player Alvaro Lopez.
- 1992 – Bailando Así Jorge Oñate feat. accordion player Alvaro Lopez.
- 1992 – Canta a Venezuela Jorge Oñate feat. accordion player Alvaro Lopez.
- 1993 – El Vallenato de Siempre Jorge Oñate feat. accordion player Alvaro Lopez.
- 1996 – Nací Para Cantar Jorge Oñate feat. accordion player Alvaro Lopez.
- 1997 – El de Todos Los Tiempos Jorge Oñate feat. accordion player Cocha Molina.
- 1998 – Es Universal Jorge Oñate feat. accordion player Cocha Molina.
- 1999 – El Poder de mis Canciones Jorge Oñate feat. accordion player Cocha Molina.
- 2001 – Llévame Contigo Jorge Oñate feat. accordion player Cocha Molina.
- 2002 – El Invencible Jorge Oñate feat. accordion player Julian Rojas.
- 2003 – En Vivo (Jorge Oñate album) Jorge Oñate.
- 2004 – Seguiré Triunfando Jorge Oñate feat. accordion player Cristian Camilo Peña.
- 2005 – Vivo cantando Jorge Oñate feat. accordion player Cristian Camilo Peña.
- 2006 – Mi Mejor Regalo Jorge Oñate feat. Accordion player Cristian Camilo Peña.
- 2008 – [40 Años de Parranda] Jorge Oñate feat. accordion player Cristian Camilo Peña.
- 2009 – Te Dedico Mis Triunfos. "La Aplanadora". Jorge Oñate feat. Accordion player Cristian Camilo Peña.
- 2012 – El Chacho de la Pelicula. Jorge Oñate feat. Accordion player Fernando Rangel Molina
- 2013 – Jorge Oñate es Universal. Jorge Oñate feat.
- 2016 – Patrimonio Cultural. Jorge Oñate feat. Accordion player Alvaro Lopez
