= Cantares del Pacífico =

Colombian band

- Origin: Buenaventura, Colombia
- Years active: 2005–present

Cantares del Pacífico are a traditional marimba band from Buenaventura, Colombia. They formed in 2005, and their debut album Aguajes de Mar y Manglar was nominated for a Latin Grammy in 2023.

== History ==
Cantares del Pacífico formed in 2005 in Buenaventura, in the Colombian department of Valle del Cauca.

In September 2013, Cantares del Pacífico travelled to Ghana as part of a cultural exchange programme celebrating the opening of the Colombian Embassy in Accra. They met with ambassador Claudia Turbay Quintero and Alfred Vanderpuije, who was then mayor of Accra. At the time, all nine members of Cantares del Pacífico were between 14 and 17 years old.

Cantares del Pacífico released their debut album Aguajes de Mar y Manglar in 2023 on record label Chaco World Music. The album was recorded at the 312 Records studio of Universidad Icesi and in the countryside of Buenaventura, and was produced by Manuel García-Orozco and Carlos Bonilla. As well as the members of Cantares del Pacífico, the album features several singers and songwriters from the basins of the Anchicayá, Yurumanguí, and Naya rivers, the oldest of whom was Juliana Valencia (aged 94). At the 2023 Latin Grammy Awards, Aguajes de Mar y Manglar was nominated for Best Folk Album. In 2024, with the support of CIOFF and the Colombian Ministry of Culture, Cantares del Pacífico toured Aguajes de Mar y Manglar in Poland, Switzerland, and France alongside a dance company called Caña Flecha.

Cantares del Pacífico are led by Eryen Korath Ortíz Garcés, who plays marimba. Ortíz also appeared on Petrona Martínez's 2021 album Ancestras, and is known as the "Queen of Marimba de Chonta".

== Musical style and themes ==
Cantares del Pacífico play traditional marimba music from the Pacific region of Colombia, particularly from the region around Buenaventura. Their album Aguajes de Mar y Manglar includes several musical styles, including chigualo (traditionally played as part of the guando funeral rites), juga, currulao, amador, and canto de boga.

== Albums ==
- Aguajes de Mar y Manglar (2023, Chaco World Music)
