= Vanderpuije (surname) =

Surname list

Vanderpuije, also Vanderpuye, originally van der Puije is a toponymic surname of Dutch origin and typically associated with an Accra-based Ghanaian family of Euro-African and Ga heritage. The progenitor of the family was Jacobus van der Puije (died in 1781), an administrator of the Dutch West India Company and President of the council (acting Director-General) of the Dutch Gold Coast in 1780. His notable descendants with the surname include:

- Claudia-Liza Vanderpuije English newsreader of Ghanaian descent
- Joseph Bartlett-Vanderpuye, also known by his stage name Smiler, British rapper and former Grime MC
- Alfred Oko Vanderpuije (born 1955), Ghanaian educator and politician, Mayor of Accra (2009–2017); Member of Parliament for Ablekuma South (2017–present)
- Isaac Lamptey Vanderpuije (later known as Kweku Akwei; born 1919), Ghanaian politician in the First Republic (1957–1966)
- John van der Puije (1848 – 1925), Gold Coast merchant, newspaper publisher, traditional ruler and politician
- Edwin Nii Lante Vanderpuye (born 1965), Ghanaian sports journalist and politician; Member of Parliament for Odododiodoo (2013–present); Deputy Minister, Ministry of Trade and Industry (2009 – 2013)
- Isaac Nii Djanmah Vanderpuye, Ghanaian politician
- William Wallace Bruce-Vanderpuye (born 1963), award-winning British actor broadcaster, writer voice-over artist and producer.
