= Voces del Bullerengue =

Colombian bullerengue group

- Origin: Bolívar, Colombia
- Years active: mid-2010s–present
- Members: Rosita Caraballo; Juana del Toro; Yadira Gómez de Simanca; Isabel Julio; Merelcy Julio; Clara Ospino; Yessi Pérez; Jaiber Pérez Cassiani; Juana Rosado; Rosa Matilde Rosado
- Past members: Antonio Berdeza; Mayo Hidalgo; Fernanda Peña; Carmen Pimentel; Santa Teherán

Voces del Bullerengue (Spanish for "Voices of Bullerengue") are a Colombian bullerengue group. The members of Voces del Bullerengue are Afro-Colombian women from the area surrounding the Canal del Dique in the department of Bolívar. They have released three albums, two of which were nominated for a Latin Grammy.

== History ==
The formation of Voces del Bullerengue was led by ethnomusicologist and music producer Manuel García-Orozco in 2015–2018, following a conversation he had with Petrona Martínez in which she told him about wanting to create a bullerengue rueda like those she had seen as a child.

Bullerengue is traditionally sung by Afro-Colombian women of the Colombian Caribbean. The singers of Voces del Bullerengue are women over the age of 60 coming from the towns of Evitar, María La Baja, San José del Playón, Villa Gloria, and San Cristóbal del Trozo, that are all located close to the Canal del Dique. They are accompanied on their albums by musicians Janer Amarís, Guillermo Valencia Hernández, Manuel García-Orozco, and Marco Rodriguez.

In 2019, Voces del Bullerengue released their debut album Anónimas y Resilientes. The album was nominated for a Grammy Award for Best Recording Package and a Latin Grammy Award for Best Recording Package.

Voces del Bullerengue's second album #Anónimas&Resilientes was released in 2025. It was recorded in the ambisonics sound format, and features traditional bullerengue songs like "Ese Ñuría" and "Toca las Palmas" alongside spoken-word tracks and contemporary songs covering topics like the COVID-19 pandemic. #Anónimas&Resilientes was nominated for a Latin Grammy Award for Best Folk Album.

Voces del Bullerengue released their third album Anónimas & Resilientes 360 in June 2026. El Tiempo described the track "La Petronita", named for Petrona Martínez, as "one of the outstanding songs of the album".

== Albums ==
- Anónimas & Resilientes (2019)
- #Anónimas&Resilientes (2025)
- Anónimas & Resilientes 360 (2026)

== Awards and nominations ==
Award ceremony	Year	Category	Work(s)	Result
Grammy Awards	2020	Best Recording Package	Anónimas & Resilientes	Nominated
Latin Grammy Awards	2019	Best Recording Package	Anónimas & Resilientes	Nominated
Latin Grammy Awards	2025	Best Folk Album	#Anónimas&Resilientes	Nominated
