= Latin Grammy Award for Best Folk Album =

Music award

- Awarded for: quality albums of the folk music genre
- Country: United States
- Presented by: The Latin Recording Academy
- First award: 2000
- Currently held by: Kerreke & Daniela Padrón for Joropango (2025)
- Website: latingrammy.com

The Latin Grammy Award for Best Folk Album is an honor presented annually at the Latin Grammy Awards, a ceremony that recognizes excellence and creates a wider awareness of cultural diversity and contributions of Latin recording artists in the United States and internationally. The award goes to solo artists, duos, or groups for releasing vocal or instrumental albums containing at least 51% of new recordings.

The award was first presented to Argentine singer Mercedes Sosa for the album Misa Criolla at the 1st Latin Grammy Awards ceremony in 2000. She also happens to be the most nominated and awarded performer in this category with five accolades. Her album Cantora 1 became the first folk album to be nominated for Album of the Year in 2009 but lost to Calle 13's Los de atrás vienen conmigo. In 2011 she became the first artist to receive this award posthumously for the album Deja La Vida Volar.

On the other hand, Peruvian singer Eva Ayllón holds the record for most nominations without a win with ten. Musicians originating from Argentina and Colombia have received this award more times than any other nationality winning on four and two occasions respectively.

== Recipients ==
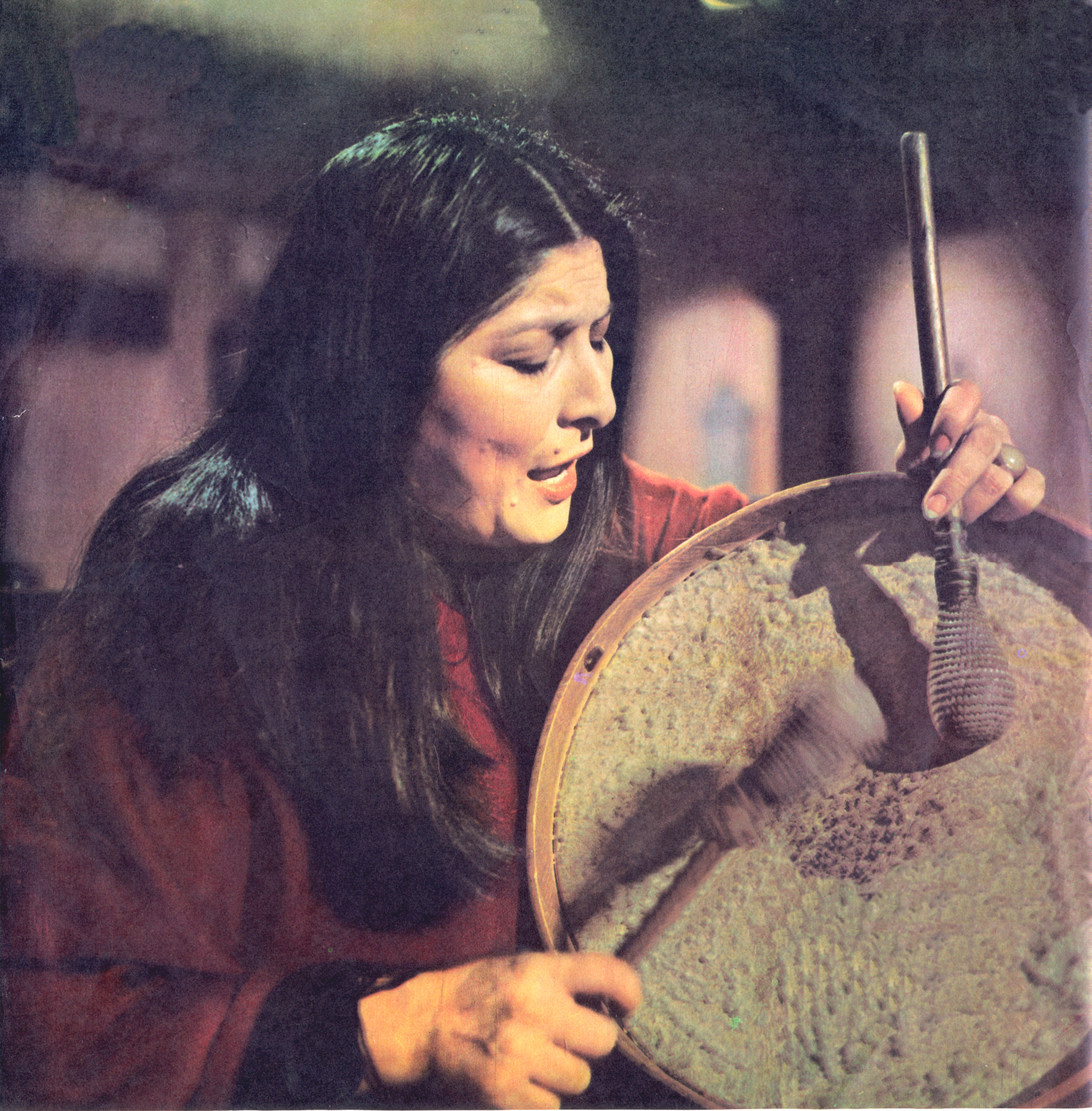
Mercedes Sosa, the most awarded performer in this category, with five wins.

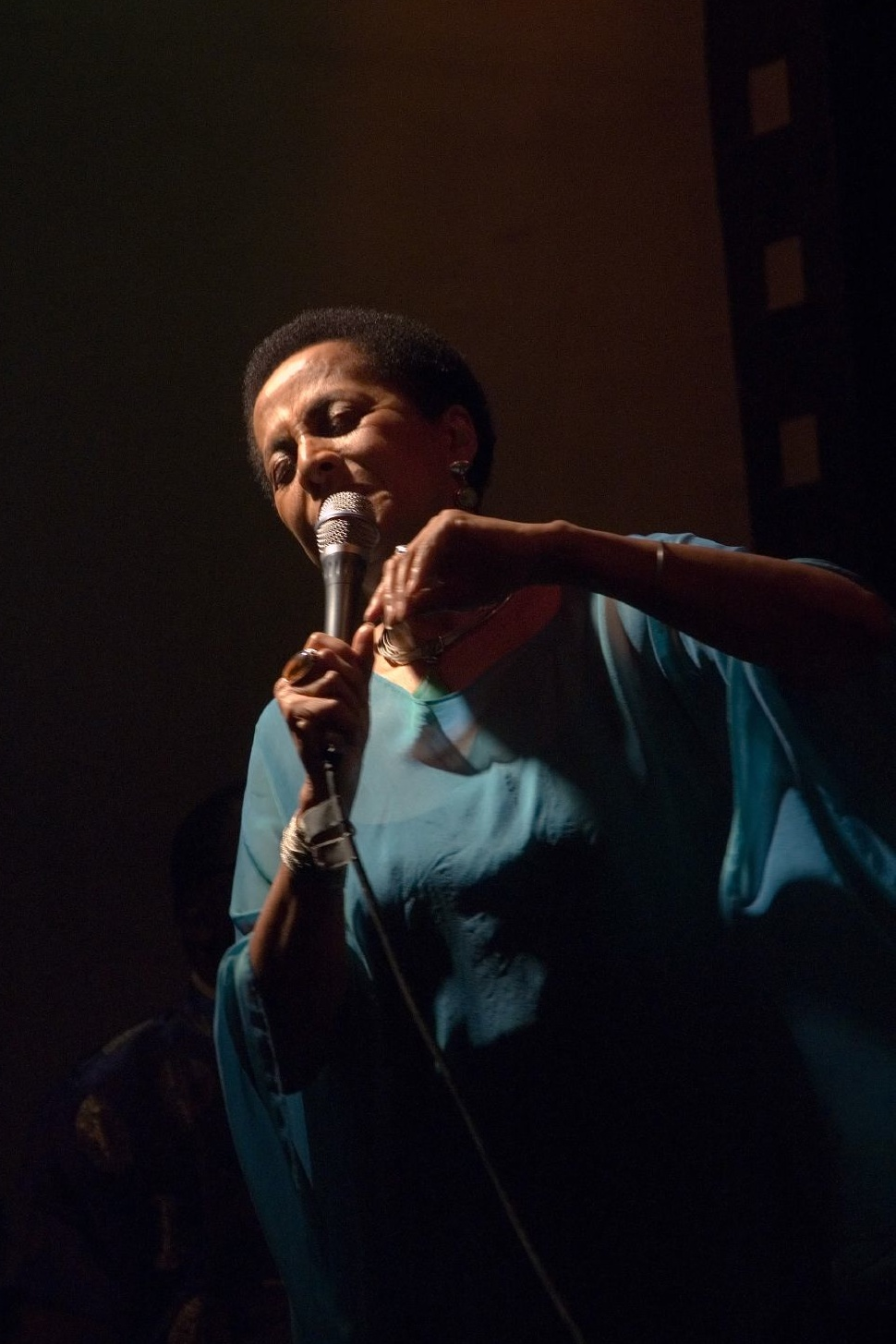
The Peruvian ministry of Culture Susana Baca won the award in 2002 and 2020.

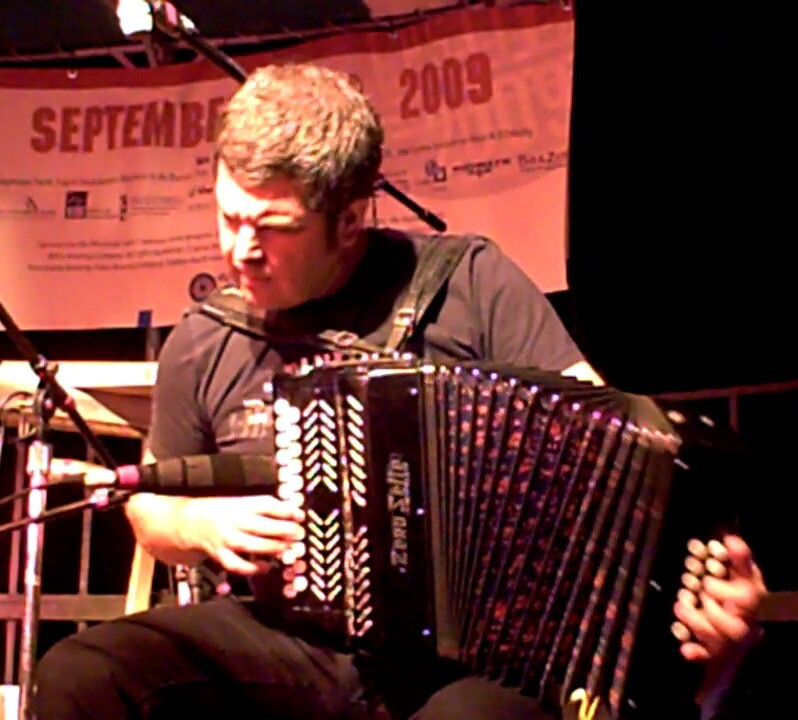
2004 winner, Basque musician Kepa Junkera.

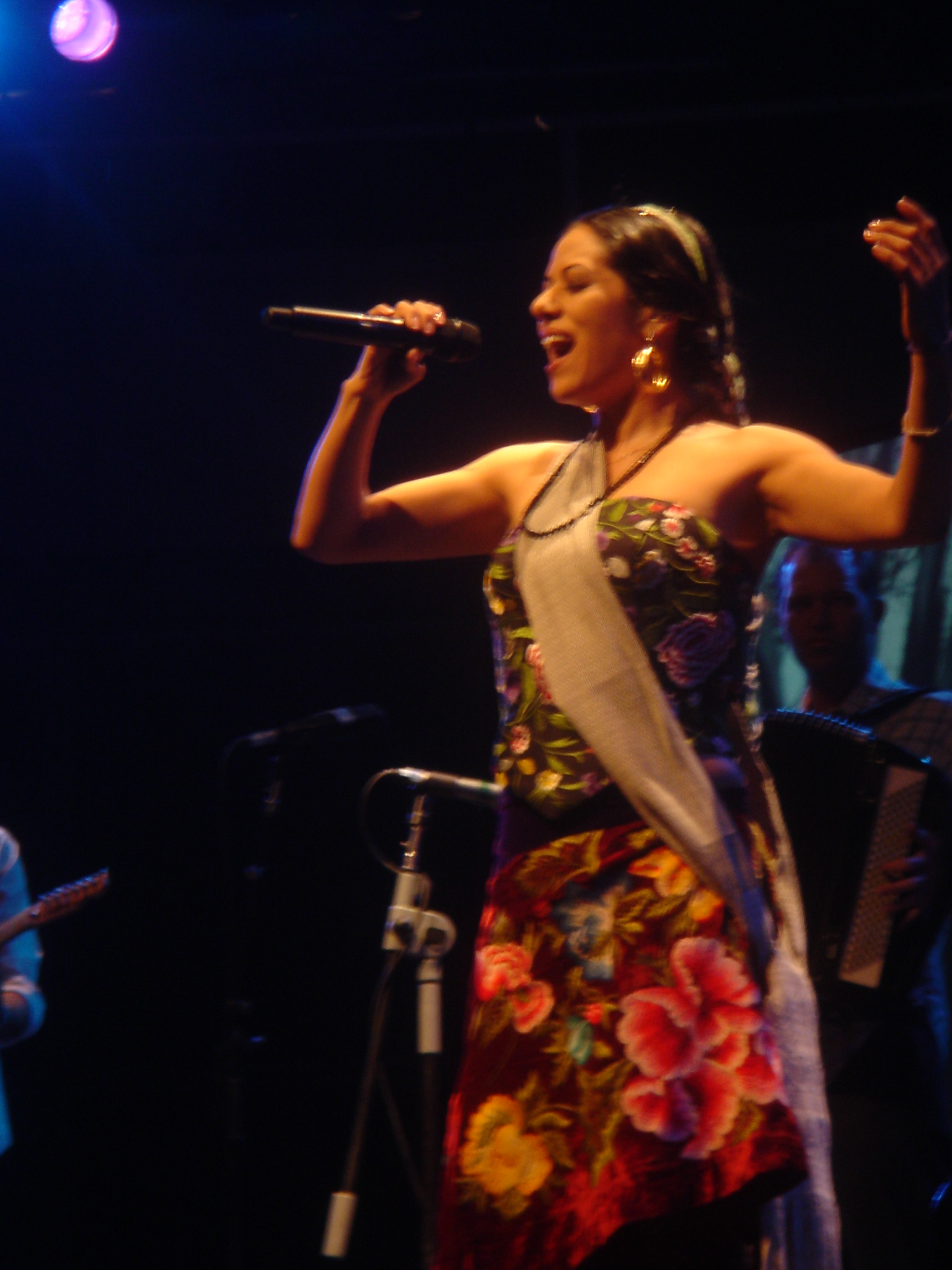
Four-time winner Lila Downs.

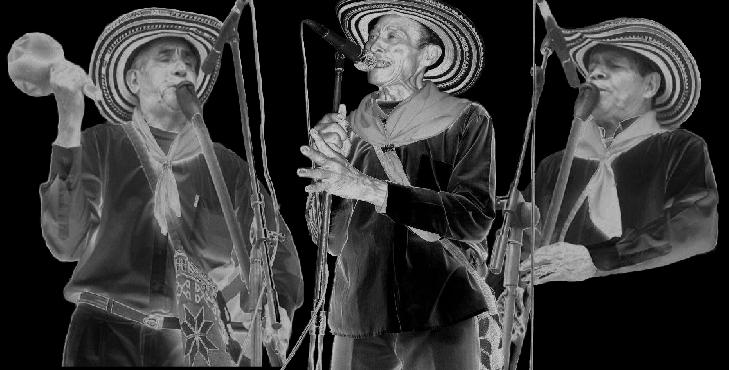
The Colombian ensemble Gaiteros de San Jacinto won the award in 2007.

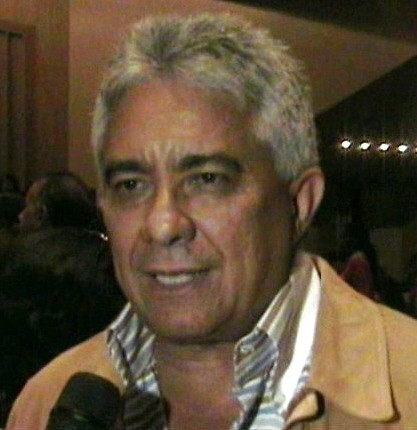
2013 winner Reynaldo Armas.

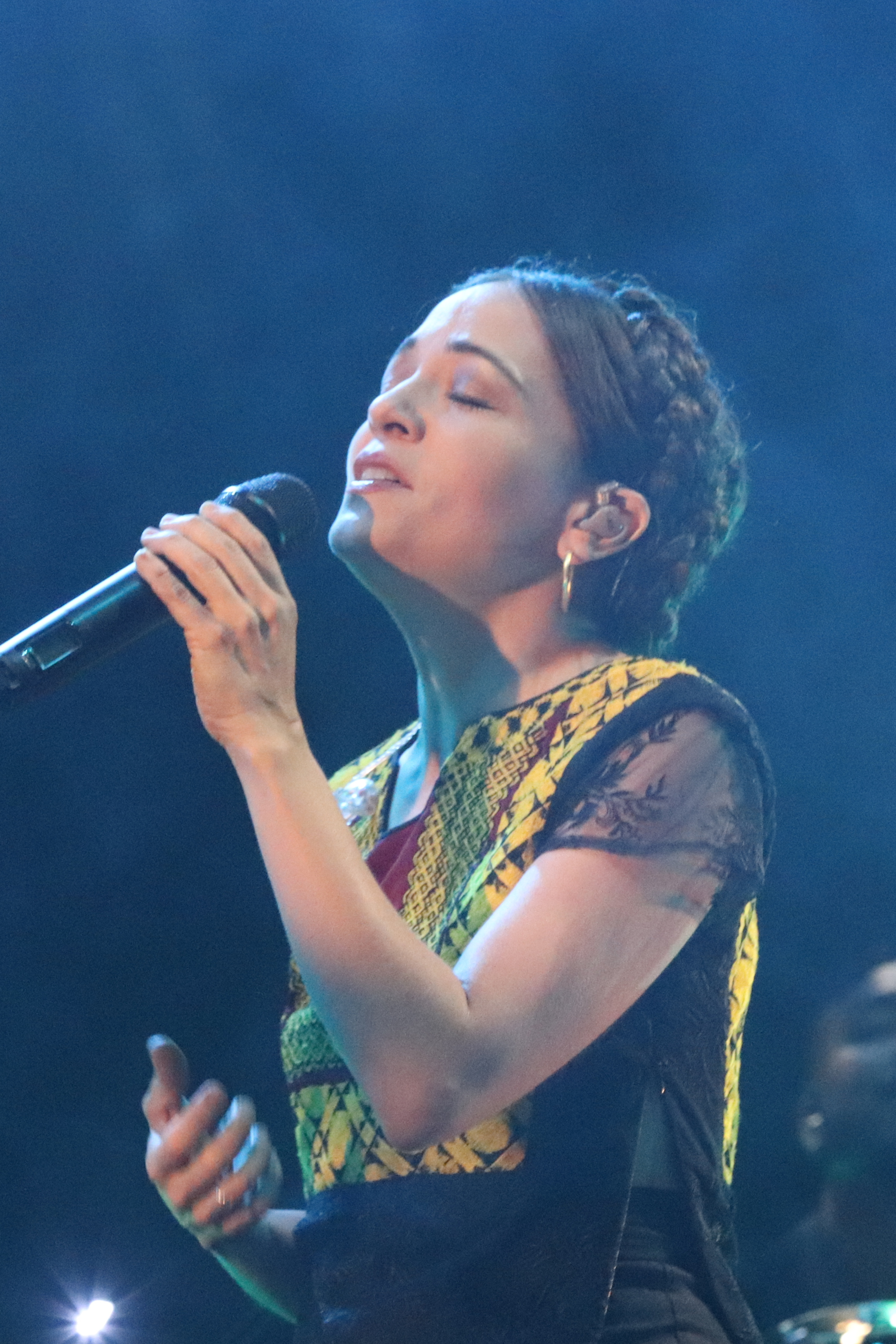
Mexican singer Natalia Lafourcade has won this award twice, in 2017 and 2018.

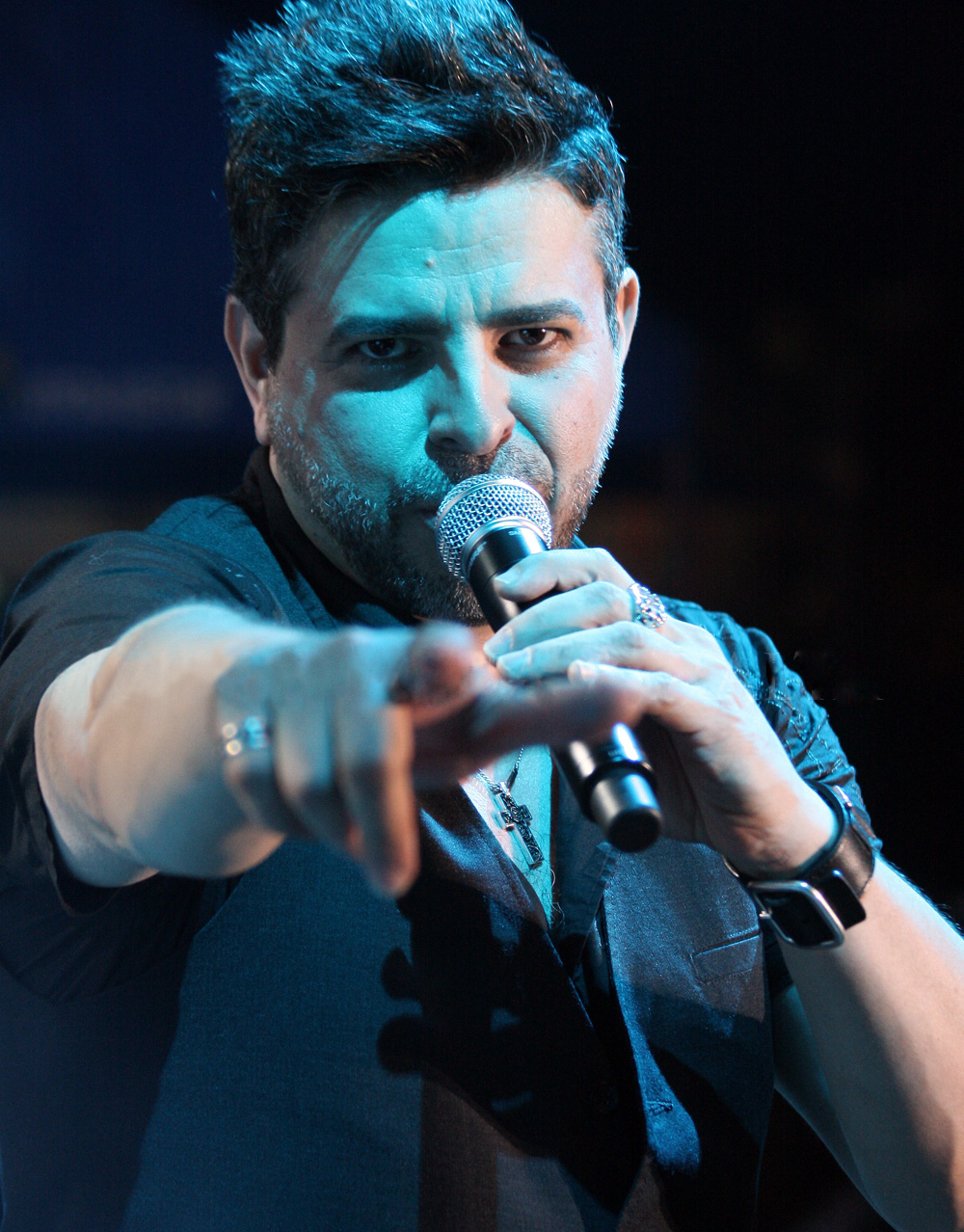
Nicaraguan singer Luis Enrique won in 2019 with C4 Trio.

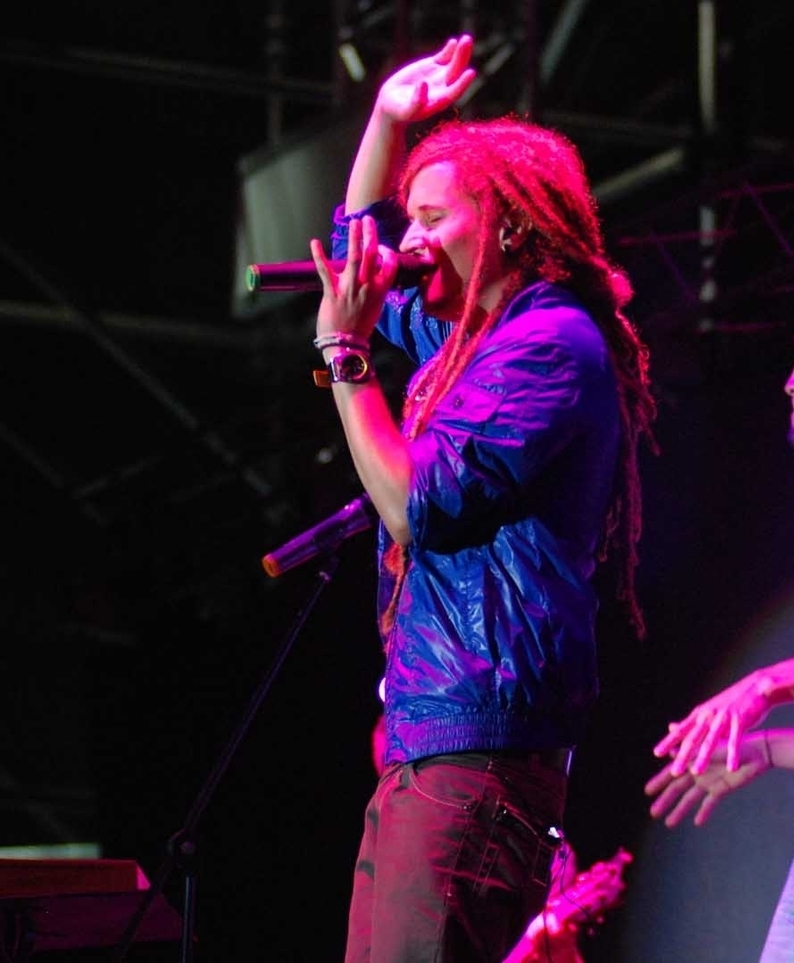
2023 winner, Vicente García.

Year^{[I]}	Performing artist(s)	Work	Nominees	Ref.
2000	Mercedes Sosa	Misa Criolla	Hevia – Tierra de nadie; Los Nocheros – Nocheros; Carlos Núñez – Os amores libres; Totó la Momposina – Pacantó	
2001	El All-Stars de La Rumba Cubana: Joaquín Betancourt & Cary Diez, producers	La Rumba Soy Yo	Jaime Uribe Espitia, José Revelo & John Villegas – Seresta; Hevia – The Other Side; Carlos Núñez – Mayo Longo; Lázaro Ros – Yamayá	
2002	Susana Baca	Lamento Negro	Berrogüetto – Hepta; Kepa Junkera – Maren; Petrona Martínez – Bonito Que Canta; Lázaro Ros – Orisha Ayé. Shangó	
2003	Mercedes Sosa	Acústico	Alex Acuña and Eva Ayllón with Los Hijos Del Sol – To My Country; Eva Ayllón – Eva; Los Muñequitos de Matanzas – Rumba De Corazón; Raíces Habaneras – Raíces Habaneras	
2004	Kepa Junkera	K	Manuel Alejandro – Manuel Alejandro y Punto: Homenaje al Grupo Haciendo Punto en Otro Son; Ecos de Borinquen – Jíbaro Hasta el Hueso: Mountain Music of Puerto Rico; Horacio Guarany – Cantor de Cantores; Perú Negro – Jolgorio; Radio Tarifa – Fiebre	
2005	Lila Downs	One Blood Una Sangre	Camerata Coral & Grupo Tepeu – Misa Criolla – Navidad Nuestra De Ariel Ramírez; Los Nocheros – Noche Amiga Mía; John Santos and El Coro Folklórico Kindembo – Para Ellos; Various Artists; Quique Domenech (producer) – Homenaje a Luis Miranda "El Pico De Oro"	
2006	Mercedes Sosa	Corazón Libre	Quique Domenech and Alejandro Croatto – Con El Corazón...; Grupo Renacer – Puerto Rico Te Saluda...; Chango Spasiuk – Tarefero De Mis Pagos; Cacho Tirao – La Guitarra Argentina; Yoruba Andabo – Rumba En La Habana Con...	
2007	Los Gaiteros de San Jacinto	Un Fuego de Sangre Pura	Los Muñequitos de Matanzas – Tambor De Fuego; Mariza – Concerto em Lisboa; Sones de México Ensemble Chicago – Esta Tierra Es Tuya (This Land is Your Land)	
2008	Cholo Valderrama	Caballo!	Damaris – Mil Caminos; Mariza – Terra; Perú Negro – Zamba Malató; Walter Silva – 20 Éxitos	
2009	Mercedes Sosa	Cantora 1	Eva Ayllón – Kimba Fá; Los Muñequitos de Matanzas – D' Palo Pa' Rumba; Walter Silva – Ya No Le Camino Mas; Soledad – Folklore	
2010	Ilan Chester	Tesoros de la Música Venezolana	Checo Acosta – El Folclor de Mi Tierra; Eva Ayllón – Canta a Chabuca Granda; Petrona Martínez – Las Penas Alegres; Juan Fernando Velasco – Con Toda el Alma	
2011	Mercedes Sosa	Deja La Vida Volar - En Gira	Eva Ayllón & Perú Negro – 40 Años de Clasicos Afro Peruanos; Jorge Pardo – Música Tradicional Peruana Homenaje A Arturo Zambo Cavero Y Oscar Aviles; Soledad Pastorutti – Vivo En Arequito; Santoral – Más Que Enamorao	
2012	Lila Downs	Pecados y Milagros	Eva Ayllón & Inti-Illimani – Eva Ayllón + Inti-Illimani Histórico; Reynaldo Armas – Me Emborraché Pa' Olvidarla; Luciano Pereyra – Con Alma de Pueblo; Chuchito Valdés & Eddy Navia – Piano & Charango	
2013	Reynaldo Armas	El Caballo de Oro	Gaêlica – Luz - Una Navidad Celta En Venezuela; Gualberto Ibarreto & C4 Trío – Gualberto + C4; Los Nocheros – Clásicos - El Pecado Original; María Mulata – De Cantos y Vuelos; Chuchito Valdés & Eddy Navia – Carnaval En Piano Charango	
2014	Lila Downs, Niña Pastori & Soledad	Raíz	Albita, Eva Ayllón & Olga Cerpa – Mujeres Con Cajones; C4 Trío & Rafael "Pollo" Brito – De Repente; Orozco - Barrientos – Tinto; Totó la Momposina – El Asunto	
2015	Lila Downs	Balas y Chocolate	Reynaldo Armas – La Muerte del Rucio Moro; Ciro Hurtado – Ayahuasca Dreams; Los Tekis – Hijos de La Tierra; Teresa Parodi – 30 Años + 5 Días	
2016	Palo Cruza'O	En Armonías Colombianas	Grupo Mapeyé – En Las Islas Canarias; Los Huayra – Gira; Nahuel Pennisi – Primavera; Marco Rodrigues – Fados do Fado	
2017	Natalia Lafourcade	Musas, Vol 1	Yuvisney Aguilar & Afrocuban Jazz Quartet – Piango, Piango; Magín Díaz – El Orisha de la Rosa; Quinteto Leopoldo Federico – Pa' Qué Más; Edward Ramírez & Rafa Pino – El Tuyero Ilustrado	
2018	Natalia Lafourcade	Musas, Vol. 2	Afrodisíaco – Viene De Panamá (Sin Raíz No Hay País); Eva Ayllón – Clavo y Canela; Marta Gómez – La Alegría y El Canto; María Mulata – Idas y Vueltas; Yubá-Iré – ¡Baila Conmigo!	
2019	Luis Enrique + C4 Trio	Tiempo Al Tiempo	Eva Ayllon – 48 Años Después; Canalón de Timbiquí – De Mar y Río; Cimarrón – Orinoco; Luis Cobos with The Royal Philharmonic Orchestra & El Mariachi Juvenil Tecalitlán – ¡Va Por México!	
2020	Susana Baca	A Capella: Grabado en Casa Durante la Cuarentena	Gaiteros de Pueblo Santo – Historias Cantadas; Los Gaiteros de San Jacinto – Toño García: El último Cacique; Quinteto Leopoldo Federico – Quinteto con Voz; Tierra Adentro – Aguije	
2021	Petrona Martínez	Ancestras	Leonel García – Amor Pasado; Tato Marenco – Jemas; Nahuel Pennisi – Renacer; Alejandro Zavala – Vocal	
2022	Sintesis, X-Alfonso & Eme Alfonso	Ancestro Sinfónico	Paulina Aguirre – La Tierra Llora; Eva Ayllón – Quédate en Casa; Pedro Aznar – Flor y Raíz; Susana Baca – Palabras Urgentes; Natalia Lafourcade – Un Canto por México - El Musical; Sandra Mihanovich – Bendiciones	
2023	Vicente García	Camino al Sol	Susana Baca – Epifanías; Cantares del Pacífico – Aguajes de Mar y Manglar; Tato Marenco – Mamá Cumbé; Quinteto Leopoldo Federico – El Trébol Agorero, Homenaje a Luis Antonio Calvo; Tierra Adentro – Ayvu	
2024	Lila Downs, Niña Pastori & Soledad	Raíz Nunca Me Fuí	Martina Camargo – Canto y Río; C4 Trío – C4 Suena a Navidad; Ciro Hurtado – Paisajes; Tonada – Bullerengue y Tonada	
2025	Kerreke & Daniela Padrón	Joropango	Susana Baca – Conjuros; Sílvia Pérez Cruz & Juan Falú – Lentamente; Julieta Rada – Candombe; Voces del Bullerengue – #Anonimas&Resilientes	

^{^[I]} Each year is linked to the article about the Latin Grammy Awards held that year.

== See also ==
- Latin Grammy Award for Best Tango Album
- Latin Grammy Award for Best Flamenco Album
