= Dolores Salinas =

Colombian singer and songwriter

- Also known as: La maldita vieja
- Born: 1933; San Basilio de Palenque, Colombia
- Died: 11 May 2011 (aged 78) Cartagena, Colombia

Dolores Salinas (1933–2011) was a Colombian singer and songwriter. She was a member of Las Alegres Ambulancias, who had a hit with her song "La Maldita Vieja".

== Biography ==
Dolores Salinas was born in 1933 in San Basilio de Palenque, in the Colombian department of Bolívar.

Salinas was a singer with the group Las Alegres Ambulancias, led by Graciela Salgado, who sang at funerals in San Basilio de Palenque as a part of the traditional practice of lumbalú. Salinas named the group, and usually sang backing vocals. Salinas also sang with Salgado and Cristobalina Estrada in a group called Las Tres Mujeres, and they appeared on the album Los Colores de la Tierra, which was produced by the Caja Agraria and the Colombian Ministry of Culture.

Las Alegres Ambulancias had a hit with "La Maldita Vieja", which Salinas wrote about a confrontation she had with a neighbour who was flirting with her husband; the song was also covered by La Mojarra Eléctrica, Faraón Bantú, and various bullerengue groups from the Colombian Caribbean. Eventually the title of the song also became a nickname for Salinas.

Salinas died aged 78 on 11 May 2011 in Cartagena. Graciela Salgado sang at her wake, and Petrona Martínez attended.
