= Emilia Herrera =

Colombian singer and songwriter

- Also known as: La Niña Emilia
- Born: Juana Emilia Herrera García; 1932; Evitar, Mahates, Colombia
- Died: 15 September 1993, aged 61 Barranquilla, Colombia
- Genres: Bullerengue

Juana Emilia Herrera García (Note: In this Hispanic American name, the first or paternal surname is Herrera and the second or maternal family name is García.) (1932–1993), known as Emilia Herrera or La Niña Emilia, was a Colombian bullerengue singer and songwriter. She released several albums in the 1980s and, alongside her cousin Irene Martínez, played a role in the popularisation of bullerengue as a commercially successful genre in Colombia.

== Biography ==
Juana Emilia Herrera García was born in 1932 in Evitar, in the corregimiento of Mahates in the Colombian department of Bolívar.

Herrera began her music career singing backing vocals for Los Soneros de Gamero, the group fronted by her cousin Irene Martínez. Herrera and Martínez later fell out, allegedly because Martínez passed off Herrera's song "El Pájaro Picón" as her own.

In the early 1980s, Herrera sang for Eduardo Dávila, producer for Barranquilla record label Felito. Felito put together a group for her called Los Cumbiamberos de Gamero, which despite the name comprised musicians from Barranquilla, not the town of Gamero in Mahates. Herrera and Los Cumbiamberos recorded five albums for Felito in the 1980s. At first they were accompanied by Pedro Ramayá, and their debut album was Gozando con la Niña Emilia in 1984. Herrera also recorded with other Colombian artists including Aníbal Velásquez and Alfredo Gutiérrez.

Herrera wrote several successful songs. Her first was "Coroncoro", written about her son having left Colombia to live in Brazil. Other notable compositions include "Currucuchú", "Periquito con Arró", "Cundé Cundé", "La Gustadera", and "El Pájaro Picón".

Herrera died of liver failure in Barranquilla on 15 September 1993, aged 61.

== Legacy ==
Jaime Andrés Monsalve wrote that Herrera's albums "mark the zenith of a phenomenon of the era: the commercialisation of traditional music, altered with elements foreign to its organology for the sake of mass release." Other bullerengue singers releasing commercially successful at the same time as Herrera include her cousin La Niña Irene, Nelda Piña, and Petrona Martínez. The success of this type of bullerengue was partly driven by its popularity within the picó culture of the Colombian Caribbean. Los Gaiteros de San Jacinto had similar crossover success in the 1970s with their albums on CBS.

In 2017, Telecaribe made a telenovela based on Herrera's life called Déjala morir, which starred Aída Bossa.

Herrera was friends with Graciela Salgado, the leader of Las Alegres Ambulancias. In 2020, Las Alegres Ambulancias (now led by two of Salgado's children) recorded a version of Herrera's song "Coroncoro" with her daughter Nelly Herrera.

== Albums ==
=== With Los Cumbiamberos de Gamero ===
Herrera released five albums with Los Cumbiamberos de Gamero on Felito.

- Gozando con La Niña Emilia (1984)
- La Pelea es Peleando (1985)
- Congo' E Riquitiqui Tiqui Tiqui (1986)
- Empuja Empuja (1987)
- Gozando con La Niña Emilia (1988), different from the 1984 record despite sharing the same title.

=== Other ===
- De Nuevo Los Macajaneros (1985, Felito), with Alfredo Gutiérrez and Emilio Ahumada.
- Sobame (1985, Felito), with Pacho Galán.
