= Martina Camargo =

Colombian singer and songwriter

- Born: Martina Camargo Centeno; 11 March 1960 (age 66); San Martín de Loba, Colombia
- Genres: Bullerengue, tambora
- Years active: 1988–present
- Website: martinacamargo.com

Martina Camargo Centeno (Note: In this Spanish name, the first or paternal surname is Camargo and the second or maternal family name is Centeno.) (born 1960) is a Colombian singer and songwriter. She has been active in music since the 1980s and has released five albums, most recently Canto y Río (2024) which was nominated for a Latin Grammy.

== Biography ==
Martina Camargo Centeno was born in San Martín de Loba, in the Colombian department of Bolívar, on 11 March 1960. Her mother was Ubaldina Centeno, and her father was Cayetano Camargo, a dancer, singer, and songwriter.

San Martín de Loba hosts an annual Festival Nacional de la Tambora. In 1988, Camargo performed her father's composition "Las Olas de la Mar" at the festival. In 1989, she won the festival competition.

Camargo has led her group Aires de San Martín since the 1980s. In 2005 she released her debut album Aires de San Martin, followed by Canto y Juego a Ritmo de Tambora in 2007 and Canto Palo y Cuero in 2009. In 2018, Camargo began working with David Lara Ramos, a "talent administrator" and professor at the University of Cartagena. Lara was involved in producing her 2018 album Paisaje en Tambora. Camargo's most recent album Canto y Río was released in 2024, and was nominated for a Latin Grammy Award for Best Folk Album. Camargo has also recorded with artists including Héctor Buitrago and Alé Kumá.

Camargo was nominated for Best Folk Artist at the 2025 edition of the Premios Nuestra Tierra.

== Albums ==
- Aires de San Martin (2005)
- Canto y Juego a Ritmo de Tambora (2007)
- Canto Palo y Cuero (2009)
- Paisaje en Tambora (2018)
- Canto y Río (2024)

== Awards and nominations ==
Award ceremony	Year	Category	Work(s)	Result
Latin Grammy Awards	2024	Best Folk Album	Canto y Río	Nominated
Premios Nuestra Tierra	2025	Best Folk Artist	—N/a	Nominated
