= Adriana Lucía =

Colombian singer

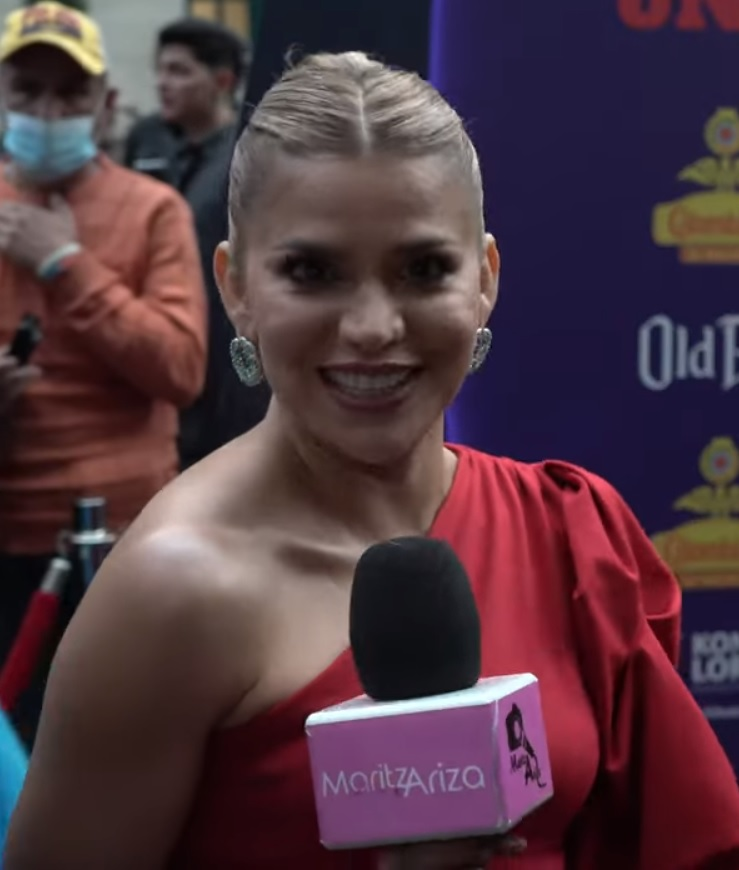
- Adriana Lucía in 2022

Background information
- Born: Adriana Lucía López Llorente; 6 July 1982 (age 43); Santa Cruz de Lorica, Colombia
- Genres: vallenato, cumbia, porro
- Years active: 1996–present

Adriana Lucía López Llorente (Note: In this Spanish name, the first or paternal surname is López and the second or maternal family name is Llorente.) (born 1982), known by the stage name Adriana Lucía, is a Colombian singer. She has released nine albums since her debut Enamórate Como Yo at the age of 14, and has twice been nominated for a Latin Grammy.

== Biography ==
=== Early life ===
Adriana Lucía was born on 6 July 1982 in El Carito, a town in the municipality of Santa Cruz de Lorica, Colombia. Her parents are Antonio López Gracia, a musician and songwriter, and Anoris Llorente.

=== Music career ===
Adriana Lucía was "discovered" in Montería at the age of 13, and in 1996 was presented by Alfredo Gutiérrez at the Vallenato Legend Festival. Early in her career she gained recognition for performing the vallenato "El Jerre Jerre" by Rafael Escalona, who encouraged her to record it. She did so for her first album Enamórate Como Yo, released in 1997 when she was 14. Adriana Lucía's second album Destellos de Amor (1998) contained more pop ballads than her debut, and was not well-received in the vallenato community.

In 2008 Adriana Lucía released Porro Nuevo, an album of porros that was nominated for the Latin Grammy Award for Best Contemporary Tropical Album. It was followed by Porro Hecho en Colombia (2014) and Porrock (2017). Porrock was nominated for the Latin Grammy Award for Best Tropical Fusion Album, and includes a version of Dorindo Cárdenas' song "Festival en Guararé", recorded as a duet with Alfredo Gutiérrez.

Adriana Lucía has named Córdoban singer Lucy González as an influence, and in 2020 she released the EP Que No Me Falte la Voz which includes the song "Lucy González", a medley of the songs "Sonia" and "La Tabaquera" that were famously sung by González with the group Antolín y su Combo Orense. In 2022 she released Maestro Lucho, an album in homage to Colombian songwriter and bandleader Lucho Bermúdez.

In 2025 Adriana Lucía released a self-titled album, which includes "Lamento Sinuano", a song written by her father in 1994, and a medley of "La Candela" and "Adiós Fulana", two songs notably recorded by Totó la Momposina on her album La Candela Viva.

== Discography ==
=== Albums ===
- Enamórate Como Yo (1997, Sonolux)
- Destellos de Amor (1998, Sonolux)
- Te Amaría (2000, Sonolux)
- De Corazón a Corazón (2001, Sonolux)
- Porro Nuevo (2008, EMI)
- Porro Hecho en Colombia (2014)
- Porrock (2017, Sony)
- Maestro Lucho (2022)
- Adriana Lucía (2025)

=== Extended plays ===
- Que No Me Falte la Voz (2020)

== Awards and nominations ==
=== Latin Grammy Awards ===
Adriana Lucía has been nominated for two Latin Grammys.

Year	Nominee / work	Award	Result
2008	Porro Nuevo	Best Contemporary Tropical Album	Nominated
2017	Porrock	Best Tropical Fusion Album	Nominated
