= Plange =

Plange is a German surname primarily associated with the town of Soest. Acting Director-General of the Dutch Gold Coast Pieter Woortman, who was born in Soest, named the children he had with the Fante woman Afodua with his mother's maiden name, Plange. Their offspring became an important Gold Coast Euro-African family. Descendants of Pieter Woortman and Afodua include:

- Sarah Adoley Plange (1913-1995), Daughter of J P Plange.
- David Plange (born 1965), English rugby league player
- Luke Plange (born 2002), English football player
- Manyo Plange (born 1988), Ghanaian boxer
- Nii Plange (born 1989), Burkinabè football player
- Mimi Plange, Ghanaian fashion designer
- Bismark Bledu Plange (born 2004), Ghanaian entrepreneur. Co-founder of BEViN Africa
