= Ceferina Banquez =

Colombian singer and songwriter

- Born: Ceferina Banquez Teherán; 3 February 1943; María La Baja, Colombia
- Died: 26 July 2023 (aged 80) Cartagena, Colombia
- Genres: Bullerengue

Ceferina Banquez Teherán (Note: In this Spanish name, the first or paternal surname is Banquez and the second or maternal family name is Teherán.) (1943–2023) was a Colombian singer and songwriter. She began her music career in her 60s, and released three albums featuring songs that she wrote about her experiences of violence and displacement, predominantly in the genre of bullerengue.

== Biography ==
Banquez was born on 3 February 1943 in María La Baja, in the Colombian department of Bolívar. Her mother María Epifanía Teherán was a housewife, and her father Eduardo Banquez was a farmer. When she was a child the family moved to Guamanga, in the municipality of El Carmen de Bolívar, where she grew up. At the age of 15 she went to live with Francisco Mirada, the father of her 7 children.

Banquez was displaced several times due to violence. She experienced La Violencia that followed the 1948 assassination of Jorge Eliécer Gaitán. Banquez was a victim of threats and blackmail, and in 1993 her nephew was murdered.

=== Music career ===
Banquez was introduced to bullerengue as a child; her mother María Epifanía and her aunts María del Carmen and María de Los Reyes were bullerengue singers. She started singing herself at the age of 8. When Banquez was 23 she told her husband that wanted to be a singer, and he refused to allow her. Banquez was widowed in the 1980s, and following a stay in María la Baja she decided in 2006 to begin singing in public. She told El Tiempo: "I got into this when I was already a grandmother. Not to earn money, but to rid myself of the suffering that the war had left me with, and I've succeeded...bullerengue keeps me alive, if it weren't for it, I'd be dead by now."

In 2009, Banquez was crowned queen of the Festival de Bullerengue in María La Baja. She began recording her debut album Cantos Ancestrales de Guamanga in 2010, and it was released in 2012. Her second album ¡No Me Dejen Sola! was recorded live at a 2018 concert in Concepción, and was released in 2020. Her third album Que le Baile Yo was announced in February 2023. Banquez had intended to support the album with a European and North American tour, but she died before the plans were realised.

=== Personal life and death ===
Banquez had seven children with her husband Francisco Mirada. She died at her home in Cartagena on 26 July 2023.

== Musical style and compositions ==
Banquez is known for writing and singing songs in the style of bullerengue. Radio Nacional de Colombia described her as "an absolute expert in styles such as bullerengue sentao, chalupa, the fandango de lengua and the son de negro". Her music has been praised by bullerengue singers Etelvina Maldonado and Petrona Martínez.

Banquez wrote songs about her experiences of violence and of displacement, including notably "Botando Sangre por la Nariz", "Pundunga", "Apegaíta", and "Estebana".

== Albums ==
- Cantos Ancestrales de Guamanga (2012)
- ¡No Me Dejen Sola! (2020)
- Que Le Baile Yo (2023)

== Awards and recognition ==
In 2013, Banquez was awarded the "Premio a la Dedicación del Enriquecimiento de la Cultura Ancestral de las Comunidades Negras, Raizales, Palenqueras y Afrocolombianas" by the Colombian Ministry of Culture.
