= Magín Díaz =

Colombian musician and composer (1922-2017)

- Born: Magín Díaz García; 30 December 1922; Mahates, Colombia
- Died: 28 November 2017 (aged 94) Las Vegas, Nevada, U.S.
- Genres: Bullerengue, sexteto
- Occupations: Musician, composer
- Years active: 1930s–2017
- Labels: Páginas de Cultura, Konn

Magín Díaz García (30 December 1922 – 28 November 2017) was a Colombian musician and composer. He is best known for performing traditional music from the Caribbean coast of Colombia and for composing several popular songs. He is particularly remembered for his chalupa version of the Cuban son "Rosa, qué linda eres", first recorded by the Sexteto Habanero Godínez in 1918, which has become a standard of the Colombian repertoire. Between 2012 and 2017, he released three solo albums, the last of which, El Orisha de la Rosa, was awarded a Grammy Award.

== Biography ==
Díaz was born in Mahates, northern Colombia, on 30 December 1922, to Domingo Díaz and Felipa García. Both of his parents were singers; his mother was a well known bullerengue singer in the late 19th century and early 20th century. Born into poverty, he along with other children worked the land, planting rice, beans and yucca to feed the family. As such, he did not go to school, and thus, could not read or write. Early on in his life, it was clear that he was musically talented, and was described as a child prodigy. Aged nine, he sang, wrote, and was able to play all kinds of instruments, including the drums, maracas, and guacharaca.

In his teenage years, he worked on a plantation as a sugar cutter. Plantations on the Caribbean coast of Colombia were for many years the country's entry point for Cuban music, and in the early 20th century, son cubano began to enter the repertoire of Afro-Colombian genres such as bullerengue and mapalé. "Rosa, qué linda eres", first recorded by the Sexteto Habanero Godínez in 1918 for Victor, was one of the early anonymous sones to cross over in this fashion, soon becoming very popular among plantation workers such as Magín Díaz. In Colombia, he has sometimes been referred to as the "author" of the song, although he could not recall composing it. Nonetheless, he is said to have been enamoured with a Caucasian plantation owner's daughter, Rosa, for whom he would perform the song. Their budding romance was taboo, and could never have happened during that time, so the song was seen as just a melody sung by a humble farmer. Over time, it gained popularity along the coast, and other musicians picked it up. Díaz was also known for being the actual author of other traditional songs such as "Por el Norte, por el Sur", "Espíritu maligno" and "Me amarás" in the 1930s and 1940s.

=== In Venezuela ===
In the 1940s, Díaz then moved to Venezuela and occasionally performed with the tropical orchestra Billo's Caracas Boys, alongside Cheo García. However, homesickness and caring for his ailing mother meant he moved back to his hometown, Gamero, a small village near San Basilio de Palenque.

In the 1970s, Díaz returned to Venezuela, to work on a construction site in Caracas. A relative of the Díaz García family, Irene Martínez, went to Medellín to meet with a lawyer to establish legal protection for the song "Rosa". Díaz could not be traced, and so Martínez was credited as the songwriter (whose version with Los Soneros de Gamero was released in 1983). The song was subsequently covered multiple times, most notably by Totó la Momposina on her 1984 album Colombie, and Carlos Vives on his 1995 album La Tierra del Olvido. The two artists would later collaborate with Díaz on a new recording of "Rosa" on Díaz's 2017 album El Orisha de la Rosa.

=== Career revival and death ===
Díaz appeared in the 2012 documentary El Tamborero Embrujao, where he performed "Rosa". In 2014, Daniel Bustos, a philosophy graduate from Universidad Javeriana, established No Name Productions, a platform to raise awareness of the "cultural debt" owed to Díaz by his fellow citizens through producing an album and documentary entitled El Orisha de la Rosa.

In 2012, an album entitled Magín y Santiago was published in the Colombian indie scene. Later in 2015, Chilean label Konn Recordings (now based in Colombia), published the double album, Magín Díaz y el Sexteto Gamerano. The traditional music is on the first disc, whilst remixes of his songs were on the second, encompassing a wide range of genres such as house, dembow and future bass.

His first solo album El Orisha de la Rosa was released in 2017, with many artists such as Vives, Monsieur Periné, Totó la Momposina and Celso Piña collaborating on the project. The album was produced by Manuel Garcia-Orozco and Christian Castagno. According to Afropop WorldWide, El Orisha de la Rosa was "the product of three years of research and recording". Díaz was a bearer of the Afro-Colombian culture, maintaining the country's magnificent and tenacious traditional music, bullerengue, which, like the country's Afro-Colombian communities, has survived near constant marginalization and discrimination over the centuries. Díaz said, "Singing for me is as if someone injected me with life… If I do not sing, I'd die."

At the 18th Annual Latin Grammy Awards, El Orisha de la Rosa won the Latin Grammy Award for Best Recording Package, but the award went to the art directors; El Orisha de la Rosa had also been nominated for Best Folk Album, but lost out to Natalia Lafourcade. He attended the ceremony, but was hospitalized at Desert Springs Hospital Medical Center on 23 November, and died on 28 November at the age of 94. (Note: Díaz's date of birth has always been a source of contention, as to how old he actually was. An official passport belonging to Díaz listed his birthday as 30 December 1922, but at the time of his death, the family statement reported that he was 95 years old, indicating he may have been born in 1921.)

== Discography ==
- Magín y Santiago (2012)
- Magín Díaz y el Sexteto Gamerano (2015)
- El Orisha de la Rosa (2017)
