= Magín Díaz y el Sexteto Gamerano =

- CD 1

Studio album by Magín Díaz and Sexteto Gamerano
- Released: 29 October 2015 (CD1); 1 November 2015 (CD2)
- Recorded: 2015
- Genre: Cumbia, vallenato, house, dembow, future bass
- Length: 110:23
- Label: Konn
- Producer: Mauricio Sandoval

Magín Díaz y el Sexteto Gamerano is a double album by the Colombian musician and composer Magín Díaz, and the backing band Sexteto Gamerano. The first disc was released on 29 October 2015, and the second on 1 November, both on Bandcamp.

== Background ==
Magín Díaz is a Colombian musician and composer, best known for being the uncredited writer of "Rosa, que linda eres", a song about an unrequited love. Born into poverty, Díaz could not read or write, but was musically talented. When the melody of "Rosa" gained popularity, the song was covered by other Colombian artists, and it was credited to distant relative Irene Martínez, for legal reasons (whose version with Los Soneros de Gamero was released in 1983). During his life, Díaz spent time in Venezuela to perform with a band and to work on a construction site, but mostly lived in his hometown, Gamero, a small village near San Basilio de Palenque.

In 2015, the manager of Chilean label Konn Recordings (now based in Colombia), Mauricio Sandoval (also known as DJ Subversivo and Mr. Toé), recorded a selection of Díaz's songs for the very first time. The double album, Magín Díaz y el Sexteto Gamerano, was released the same year on Bandcamp. The traditional music is on the first disc, whilst remixes of his songs were on the second, encompassing a wide range of genres such as house, dembow and future bass.

== Track listing ==
Disc one: Tradicional
No.	Title	Writer(s)	Length
1.	"Juana Caribe" (interpreted by Magín Díaz)	Wady Bedrán	4:54
2.	"La Cañandunga"	Díaz	4:44
3.	"La rama de Tamarindo"	Traditional	4:27
4.	"Mama abuela"	Díaz	3:51
5.	"Me amarás"	Díaz	5:24
6.	"Por el norte, por el sur"	Díaz	4:48
7.	"Rosa, que linda eres" (interpreted by Magín Díaz)	Irene Martínez	4:08
8.	"El Ciempiés"	Díaz	4:56
9.	"Ya no quiero que me llores más"	Díaz	4:31
10.	"Yen, yen"	Díaz	4:20
11.	"Yo me voy con tigo"	Díaz	4:51
12.	"Ña Maria"	Traditional	3:56
13.	"Chimbililin"	Filiberto Arrieta	2:54

Disc two: Remixes
No.	Title	Length
1.	"Yen, yen (King Coya Remix)"	5:11
2.	"La rama de Tamarindo (Dengue Dengue Dengue! Remix)"	4:00
3.	"Yo me voy con tigo (Copia Doble Systema Remix)"	3:23
4.	"Me amarás (Tropikore Remix)"	4:30
5.	"Mama abuela (Caballo Remix)"	3:29
6.	"Ya no quiero que me llores más (Caribombo Remix)"	4:06
7.	"Ciempiés (Akilin Remix)"	4:49
8.	"Juana Caribe (Bleepolar Remix)"	4:24
9.	"Por el norte, por el sur (Professor Angel Sound Remix)"	5:20
10.	"Ña Maria (Humberto Pernet Remix)"	3:34
11.	"Rosa, que linda eres (Mr. Toé Remix)"	4:28
12.	"Chimbililin (Dany F Remix)"	4:56
13.	"La Cañamdunga (Galletas Calientes Remix)"	5:49
Total length:		109:83

== Personnel ==
Adapted from the Bandcamp page.

- Magín Díaz – vocalist
- Filiberto Arrieta – secondary vocalist and chorus leader
- Carlos Torres – alegre drum and chorus
- Joaquin García – bass drums
- Manuel Martinez – caller
- Guillermo Valencia – secondary caller and musical arrangements
- Enrique Díaz – guache and chorus
- Germán Soto – guacharaca
- Jorge Luís Pérez – choirs

Production

- Mauricio Sandoval – production
- Diego Angulo – production assistant
- Francisco Rojas – traditional disco
- Tropikore – disco remixes
