= Papayal, Bolivar =

Papayal
- Populated center
- Location in Colombia
- Coordinates: 8°57′N 73°57′W
- Country: Colombia
- Department: Bolívar Department
- Elevation: 28 m (92 ft)
- Time zone: UTC-5 (Colombia Standard Time)

Papayal is a populated center of Colombia for San Martín de Loba municipality, located in the Bolívar Department, northern Colombia.
