= Etelvina Maldonado =

Colombian singer and songwriter

- Born: Etelvina Maldonado de la Hoz; 25 April 1932; Santa Ana, Bolívar, Colombia
- Died: 26 January 2010 (aged 77) Cartagena, Colombia
- Genres: Bullerengue

Etelvina Maldonado de la Hoz (Note: In this Spanish name, the first or paternal surname is Maldonado and the second or maternal family name is De la Hoz.) (1932–2010) was a Colombian bullerengue singer and songwriter. She sang with Totó la Momposina and with groups including Kasabe and Alé Kumá.

== Biography ==
Etelvina Maldonado de la Hoz was born on 25 April 1932 in Santa Ana, in the Colombian department of Bolívar. Her mother was Francisca "Pacha" de la Hoz, a bullerengue singer, and her father was Pedro Maldonado. At the age of 15, Maldonado moved with her mother to Cartagena, and later they moved again to Olaya Herrera.

Maldonado's musical career started when she appeared with Totó la Momposina at the Festival del Porro in San Pelayo. They later toured together, and Maldonado also sang with the groups Arboletes, Candilé, Kasabe, and Alé Kumá, among others. She formed her own group in 2003, and released one album with them in 2006.

Notable compositions by Maldonado include "Por Qué Me Pega" and "Llorando Te Coge el Día". She won "best voice" awards at the bullerengue festivals in María La Baja and Puerto Escondido, and later judged the bullerengue queen competition of the latter.

Maldonado had nine children. She died on 26 January 2010 in Cartagena.
