= Pabla Flores =

Colombian singer and songwriter

- Also known as: La Payi
- Born: Pabla Flores González; 18 March 1955 (age 71); María La Baja, Colombia
- Genres: Bullerengue
- Years active: 2000s–present
- Member of: Pal' Lereo Pabla

Pabla Flores González (Note: In this Spanish name, the first or paternal surname is Flores and the second or maternal family name is González.) (born 1955) is Colombian bullerengue singer and songwriter. She leads the musical group Pal' Lereo Pabla, and founded a bullerengue school in María La Baja.

== Biography ==
Pabla Flores González was born on 18 March 1955 in María La Baja, in the Colombian department of Bolívar. She was one of nine children, and she learned to sing by listening to her mother Eulalia González Bello, a well-known bullerengue singer.

Flores started her music career when her mother began to lose her voice in the early 2000s. Before that she had worked as a farmer, as a seller of fish, and in Venezuela as a domestic worker. In 2014 she formed a bullerengue group called Pal' Lereo Pabla, comprising around 20 singers and musicians. Pal' Lereo Pabla have performed at the National Bullerengue Festival in Necoclí, where Flores also won the award for best singer.

In 2023, Flores released the album Bullerengue Pa'l Mundo on Cartagena record label Heroicos Récords. Some tracks on the album appear in the film La Suprema, in which Flores also acted.

== Bullerengue school ==
Flores founded a school in María La Baja called the Escuela de Formación Integral Eulalia Gonzáles, where children are taught to sing, write, and perform bullerengue. Initially the school was supported by a United Nations project, and in 2022 it was certified by the Colombian Ministry of Culture, functioning formally as a school since early 2023.

== Albums ==
- Bullerengue Pa'l Mundo (2023, Heroicos Records)
