= Irene Martínez (disambiguation) =

Irene Martínez may refer to:

- Irene M. Gamba (Irene Martínez Gamba, born 1957), Argentine–American mathematician
- Irene Martínez (Irene Martínez Tartabull, 1946–2014), Cuban track and field athlete
- Irene Martínez (gymnast) (born 1966), Spanish gymnast
- Irene Martínez (singer) (Irene Martínez Mejía, 1923–1993), Colombian singer and songwriter
