= Yurumanguí language =

Extinct language of Colombia

Yurumanguí
- Yurimangí
- Native to: Colombia
- Region: Yurumanguí River
- Ethnicity: Yurumanguí
- Era: attested 1768
- Language family: Language isolate

Language codes
- ISO 639-3: None (mis)
- Glottolog: yuru1243
- Linguasphere: 81-NAA-aa

Yurumanguí is an extinct language isolate formerly spoken in Colombia. It is known solely from a wordlist collected in the 1760s and was proposed in 1942 by French linguist Paul Rivet to be a member of the proposed Hokan language family, though this is no longer accepted by modern classifications.

== History ==
=== Documentation ===
It is known only through a short list of words and phrases recorded by Father Christoval Romero and given by him to Captain Sebastián Lanchas de Estrada, during an expedition in 1766, who included them in the report of his travels of 1768. Thereafter, the language and its speakers disappear from the historical record.

== Classification ==
Father Romero's word list was discovered in the archives and published, with analysis and commentary, by Rivet (1942), who argued that the language was a member of the Hokan language family. This claim was accepted by Joseph Greenberg (1960), but is currently considered poor and unconvincing; a critique of Greenberg is given by William Poser (1992). Jacinto Jijón y Caamaño (1945) sought to connect Yurumanguí with both Hokan and Chibchan, whereas Swadesh (1963) saw connections with Ofaye (Macro-Jê) and Chamicura (Maipurean). Willem Adelaar (2004) notes similarities with Esmeralda (Takame). However, it is generally considered to be a language isolate (e.g. by Terrence Kaufman (1990) and Adolfo Constenla Umaña (1991)).

== Geographical distribution ==
Yurumanguí was spoken along the upper Yurumanguí, Cajambre, and Nava Rivers of Colombia.

== Phonology ==
A few elements of Yurumanguí phonology may be ascertained; for example, the letters ⟨ll, x, r, rr, h⟩ are completely absent, there is only a singular attestation of ⟨d⟩, four instances of ⟨j⟩, and five occurrences of ⟨f, z⟩; many tokens of the latter are variants of ⟨s⟩. ⟨g⟩ is typically found between vowels or after ⟨n⟩; only two instances of word-initial ⟨g⟩ are known, one of which (gaga 'I am going to defecate') is probably onomatopoeic. The letters ⟨c, qu⟩ typically follow their usages as in Spanish, though there are some instances of ⟨c⟩ before ⟨i⟩, and it also alternates with ⟨s⟩ (e.g. asa~acá '1SG'), possibly hinting at an affricate phonetic value for these letters., though they may simply have been "difficult to distinguish" in the original document. A sequence of five vowels (or six if ⟨y⟩ is counted as [i]) is attested in the word yaioiabusca 'colino de plátano'. Closed, or consonant-final, syllables are rare, and Matthias Urban (2019) describes that "their presence can only be guessed at" from a number of words.

== Morphology ==
Adelaar (2004) describes a number of affixes, such as -sa, which "characterises the citation form of several verbs", and ca(i)-, found in body parts and kinship terms, though there are a number of words belonging to the latter semantic categories which do not exhibit the prefix.

== Vocabulary ==
Below are selected entries from the 1768 Yurumanguí vocabulary given in Ortiz (1946), with original Spanish glosses and translated English glosses.

Spanish gloss (original)	English gloss (translated)	Yurumanguí
comer	eat	lamá
come tu	you eat	lamaé
beber	drink	chuma
bebe tu	you drink	chumaé
la candela, o fuego	candle; fire	angua
la leña	firewood	anga
el río	river	ayo
el agua	water	aia
plátano	banana	cua
el sol	sun	cicona
la luna	moon	digia
la casa	house	yuiua
dormir	sleep	angasa
bañarse	bathe	pun pun
los frijoles	beans	aimaca
mujer	woman	quitina
hombre	man	queobai
madre	mother	caigi
padre	father	maa
el tigre	jaguar	aguabai layaco; cananagua
el conejo	rabbit	naupica
el puerco montés	wild pig	naubaca
el gavilán	hawk	yuoica
el papagayo	parrot	taucano
el maíz	maize	aocona
los oídos	ears	auciá
el peine	comb	aubaisa
la ceniza	ashes	augafa
las alas de ave	wings of bird	aicán
el relámpago	lightning	angaisa
yo	I	acá; asa
está lejos	far	aiaba
el camino	path	angaipoa
machete	machete	baical
el hacha	axe	totoque
la puerta	door	bai
el sombrero	hat	sipana
la olla	pot	lictina
el canasto	basket	pitina
la yuca	cassava	nasotasi
el corazón	heart	colopeiaisa; bibaspa
el alma o respiración	soul; breath	sipia sinaisa
el cielo	sky	siaa
morir	die	saisa
ya murió	died	saibai
mariposa	butterfly	cauba
coser	sew	blaisa
matar	kill	aimasa
los dientes	teeth	tina
la cabeza	head	caicona
los ojos	eyes	couna
el pelo	hair	cailusa
la frente	forehead	laiga
la cara	face	caumaca
la mano	hand	aisca
las uñas	fingernails	yacuisa
estar cansado	be tired	cafeisa
hermanos	siblings	yasa
la leche	milk	tuiusa
el queso	cheese	vecatuta
las estrellas	stars	nanaa
la noche	night	maisa
el día	day	baisa
aguja	needle	ypena
afeitar	shave	yebe
el perro	dog	cuan
el colmillo	fang	tinza
la vena	vein	yaisina
la sangre	blood	yaa
el tábano	fly (insect)	quipua
estar lloviendo	raining	siga
tronar	thunder (verb)	bisca
fruta silvestre	wild fruit	tamea
periquito	parakeet	ilica
la arena	sand	sibesa
la saliva	saliva	zoima
la tierra	earth	minni

== Bibliography ==
- Loukotka, Čestmír (1968) Classification of South American Indian Languages. University of California, Los Angeles.
