= Jacobus van der Puije =

Dutch colonial administrator

President of the Council of the Dutch Gold Coast
- In office 11 April 1780 – 30 December 1780
- Preceded by: Pieter Woortman
- Succeeded by: Pieter Volkmar

Personal details
- Born: c. 1754 Middelburg, Netherlands
- Died: 24 June 1781 (aged 26–27) Dutch Gold Coast

Jacobus van der Puije (c. 1754 – 24 June 1781) was an administrator of the Dutch West India Company. He became President of the council (acting Director-General) of the Dutch Gold Coast in 1780.

== Biography ==
Jacobus van der Puije was born in Middelburg to a family that originally came from Sint-Maartensdijk. His father was William van der Puije (born 1703). He was governor of Fort Crèvecoeur in Accra from 1776 till 1780, when he succeeded Pieter Woortman as the colonial governor of the entire Dutch Gold Coast.

Jacobus van der Puije had a daughter named Anna van der Puije with an enslaved African woman named Asoewa. Anna van der Puije herself was also enslaved and freed for 1 mark of gold, paid for by Jacob Rühle, who subsequently married her. He also had a son, Peter van der Puije (born c. 1775), with a local Ga woman from Accra by the name of Ayeley Ablah.

== Legacy ==
Jacobus van der Puije is the direct patrilineal ancestor of the Vanderpuije (sometimes spelt as Vanderpuye) family in Ghana. Descendants include politicians Alfred Oko Vanderpuije, Edwin Nii Lante Vanderpuye and Isaac Nii Djanmah Vanderpuye, newsreader Claudia-Liza Armah-Vanderpuije, actor William Vanderpuye, and musician Joseph Bartlett-Vanderpuye.
