= Graciela Salgado =

Colombian drummer, singer, and songwriter

- Born: Graciela Salgado Valdez; 1929 or 1930; San Basilio de Palenque, Colombia
- Died: 13 September 2013 (aged 83) Cartagena, Colombia

Graciela Salgado Valdez (Note: Also spelled Valdés. In this Spanish name, the first or paternal surname is Salgado and the second or maternal family name is Valdez.) (1929 or 1930 – 2013) was a Colombian drummer, singer, and songwriter. She founded and led the group Las Alegres Ambulancias, and in 2012 was awarded a prize by the Colombian Ministry of Culture for "strengthening Afro-Colombian culture".

== Biography ==
Graciela Salgado was born in San Basilio de Palenque, in the Colombian department of Bolívar. She was the only daughter of Manuel Salgado Cañate, known as Batata II, and María de la Cruz Valdez. Salgado was born into the Batata drumming dynasty; her brother Paulino Salgado was known as Batata III.

Salgado's family were practitioners of the lumbalú tradition, which Radio Nacional de Colombia describes as "a legacy dating back more than five hundred years, passed down from father to son, a custom that invites the singers to accompany the deceased for nine days through dances, songs and prayers in the Bantu languages, native to the African continent." Salgado was the only woman to permitted play the pechiche, a large drum that her father was also known for playing, during the lumbalú.

In 1980 Salgado founded Las Alegres Ambulancias, a vocal group based in the lumbalú funeral tradition but which also performs songs about themes other than death. Salgado usually sang lead vocals in the group, while Dolores Salinas sang backing vocals. When asked about the name of the group, Salgado said:

Le pusimos el nombre de Las Alegres Ambulancias porque nosotras somos unas viejas alegres, tomamos ron, cantamos y animamos los entierros a donde sea.

We named it Las Alegres Ambulancias because we are a bunch of happy old ladies, we drink rum, sing, and liven up funerals wherever we go.

Salgado died aged 83 on 14 September 2013 in Cartagena. Justo Valdez, Petrona Martínez, and Rafael Cassiani sang at her wake. Las Alegres Ambulancias is now led by her children Emelia Reyes and Tomás Teherán.

== Musical style and compositions ==
Salgado wrote songs in the styles of bullerengue, fandango, and chalupa. Her notable compositions include "La Cosita", "Margarita", "Macaco Mata el Toro", "Elelé Valdez", "Pa'la Escuela Nene", "Regobbé", "Me Picó un Mosquito", "Pájaro de la Mar", and "Tres Golpes".

== Awards and recognition ==
In 2012 Salgado was the honoured artist at the Festival de Tambores y Expresiones in Palenque. Also in 2012 the Colombian Ministry of Culture awarded her a prize for "strengthening Afro-Colombian culture".
