= Mayor of Accra =

The following is a list of mayors of Accra, Ghana.

- E. C. Quaye (1958–1962)
- Benjamin N. O. Addison (1963 - 1966)
- G. W. Amarteifio (1970-1972)
- W. C. O. Acquaye-Nortey (1972)
- S. J. A Mark Okai
- A. K. Konuah (1979)
- Nat Ashalley-Anthony (1979–1981)
- Triumvirate (Enoch T. Mensah, C.S. Botchway, Daniel Osabu-Kle) (1982–1983)
- Enoch Teye Mensah (1983–1991)
- Nat Nunoo Amarteifio (1994–1998)
- Samuel Adoquaye Addo (1998–2000)
- Solomon Ofei Darko (2001–2003)
- Stanley Nii Adjiri Blankson (2004–2009)
- Alfred Oko Vanderpuije (2009–2017)
- Mohammed Adjei Sowah (2017–present)
