= Los Gaiteros de San Jacinto =

Colombian traditional folkloric cumbia group

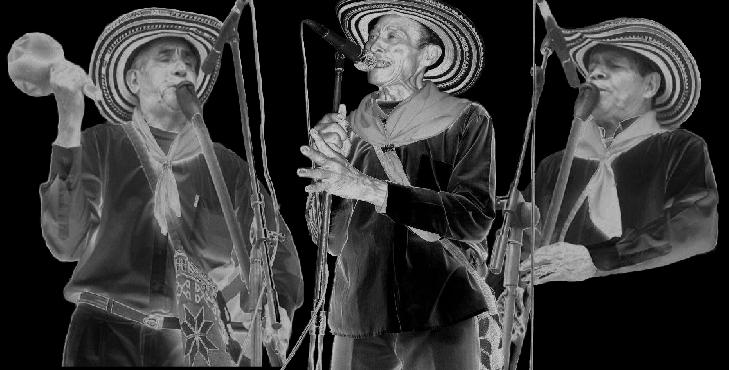
- Los Gaiteros de San Jacinto: Nicolas Hernandez, Juancho Fernández, y Toño García

Background information
- Origin: San Jacinto, Bolívar, Colombia
- Genres: Cumbia, Porro, Bullerengue, Gaita, Puya
- Years active: 1940–present
- Labels: Smithsonian Folkways Recordings
- Members: Nicolás Hernández (Nico); Juan "Chuchita" Fernández; Manuel Antonio "Toño" García (Toño); Rafael Rodríguez; Gabriel Torregrosa (hijo); Fredys Arrieta; Jairo Herrera; Dionisio Yepes
- Website: http://www.myspace.com/losgaiterosdesanjacinto

Los Gaiteros de San Jacinto are a Colombian traditional folkloric cumbia group formed in the Caribbean Region of Colombia which have been active since 1940. Their folkloric music preserves the traditional rhythms and sounds product of a mixture of the Colombian Indigenous, Spanish and Afro-Colombian heritage.

The gaiteros meaning those who play the gaita flute and San Jacinto for the town the group originated from San Jacinto in the Colombian Department of Bolívar.

On November 9, 2007 the group won a Latin Grammy award in the category Folkloric Music for their album "Un Fuego de Sangre Pura: Los Gaiteros de San Jacinto from Colombia" (A Fire of Pure Blood), released on Smithsonian Folkways Recordings.

== History ==
Los Gaiteros de San Jacinto's members were born in San Jacinto in the Colombian Department of Bolívar in the 1940s. Miguel Antonio Hernández Vásquez also known as "Toño" Fernández, assembled a group of San Jacinto musician including Juan and José Lara, Pedro Nolasco Mejía and Manuel de Jesus "Mañe" Serpa who formed the group's official line-up.

From the 1950s onwards, they began touring Colombia, managed by writer and researcher Manuel Zapata Olivella. As decades passed, the group began incorporating a second generation of musicians, among whom can be found some of the sons of the original line-up.

En 1982, due to Toño Fernández's health problems, Joaquín Nicolás Hernández Pacheco, Fernández's nephew, took the role of director of the band.

In 2006, the group recorded an album for the Smithsonian Folkways Recordings label. In November 2007, the group won a Latin Grammy Award for the best Folkloric Music album. During the award ceremony, they appeared on stage with Puerto Rican group Calle 13.

Currently, the group is headed by four of the original members, Nico, Toño, Juancho and Rafa Rodríguez, who perform with a new generation of gaiteros: Gabriel Torregrosa (son), Fredys Arrieta, Dionisio Yepes, Gualber Rodríguez and other young musicians who occasionally play with the group.

== Discography ==
- Un Fuego de Sangre Pura (2006)

== See also ==
- Porro
- Cumbia
- Totó la Momposina
