= La Candela Viva =

Studio album by Totó La Momposina y Sus Tambores
- Released: September 10, 1993
- Genre: Cumbia, bullerenge
- Label: Real World Records
- Producer: Phil Ramone

La Candela Viva (translated "The Living Candle") is both an album and single from the Colombian singer Totó La Momposina. The album, with songs in the cumbia and bullerengue styles, ignited Momposina's career and was influential in Colombian music.

== Song ==
Authorship of the song is disputed. For many years, it was credited to Alejandro Durán. Later research indicated it was composed by Heriberto Pretelt Medina.

The song's lyrics tell the story of a 1923 fire that destroyed more than 100 houses in Chimichagua, located in the Cesar Department of Colombia. The survivors, according to the story, took from destiny the keys to run life into a vibrant celebration.

== Album ==
The album was recorded over two sessions, a live recording in 1991 as part of Real World Recording Week and s second in 1992 at the Real World Studios in Wiltshire England. Phil Ramone produced the album. It was released on September 10, 1993, on Peter Gabriel's Real World Records label.

The album ignited Momposina's international career and "became a hugely influential and important record in Colombia." Two songs from La Candela Viva were included on the soundtrack of the 1997 movie Jungle 2 Jungle. Additional music from the same recording session was later released 23 years later as the album "Tambolero".

=== Critical reception ===
A 1993 review in The Guardian described Colombia as "one of the great musical melting pots of the world" and noted: "Massed ranks of drummers set up a poundin rhythm, she then cuts right across it with sturdy Spanish-influenced ballads and dance songs. When she eventually brings on Spanish guitars, she dominates that too with her own vocal flurries. Limited appeal, maybe, but impressive." The Detroit Free Press called it "a real treat for lovers of Afro-Cuban rhythms."

In a 2024 ranking of the 600 greatest Latin American albums, La Candela Viva was ranked No. 32.

=== Track listing ===
1. Dos De Febrero 4:17
2. Adiós Fulana 5:28
3. El Pescador 4:04
4. La Sombra Negra 3:22
5. Dáme La Mano Juancho 3:58
6. Malanga 4:05
7. Mapale 2:31
8. Curura 4:56
9. Chi Chi Mani 2:41
10. La Candela Viva 4:15
11. La Acabación 3:41

=== Credits ===
- Vocals – Totó La Momposina
- Backing vocals – Avelino Sanchez, Dario Castro, Euridice Oyaga, Marco Vinicio Oyaga, Paulino "Batata" Salgado
- Bongos – Paulino "Batata" Salgado
- Claves – Eduardo Martinez*
- Drums [Bombo] – Rafael Ramos (Track 8)
- Drums [Guache] – Eduardo Martinez* (Track 7)
- Drums [Tambor Hembra, Bombo, Guache] – Marco Vinicio Oyaga
- Drums [Tambor Hembra] – Dario Castro, Paulino "Batata" Salgado
- Engineer – Richard Blair (tracks: 1, 4 to 9, 11), Richard Chappell (Tracks 2, 3, 10)
- Flute [Gaita Hembra, Gaita Macho] – Mayte Montero* (Tracks 5, 8, 11)
- Eduardo Martinez* (Tracks 5, 8, 11)
- Guitar – Rafael Ramos (Track 8)
- Maracas – Marco Vinicio Oyaga (Tracks 3, 10), Paulino "Batata" Salgado (Tracks 4, 6, 9), Eduardo Martinez (Tracks 1, 5, 8, 11)
- Mixed by Richard Blair
- Percussion [Llamador] – Dario Castro
- Percussion [Marimbula] – Paulino "Batata" Salgado
- Producer – John Hollis (Tracks 1, 4 to 9, 11), Marco Vinicio Oyaga (Tracks 1, 4 to 9, 11), Phil Ramone (Gracks 2, 3, 10), Richard Blair (Tracks 1, 4 to 9, 11)
- Strings [Tiple] – Avelino Sanchez
