= Pieter Woortman =

German merchant and colonial governor (1700–1780)

Director-General of the Dutch Gold Coast
- In office 8 June 1767 – 11 April 1780
- Preceded by: Jan Pieter Theodoor Huydecoper
- Succeeded by: Jacobus van der Puije

Personal details
- Born: 23 March 1700 Soest, Brandenburg-Prussia, Holy Roman Empire
- Died: 14 April 1780 (aged 80) Elmina, Dutch Gold Coast
- Spouse(s): Elisabeth Carrier; Afodua

Pieter Woortman (born 23 March 1700 – 14 April 1780) was a Prussian born Dutch slave trader and colonial administrator of the Dutch West India Company. He was one of the longest-serving Director-General of the Dutch Gold Coast, in office between 1767 and 1769 (ad interim) and from 1769 until his death in 1780.

== Biography ==
Pieter Woortman was born in Soest, Brandenburg-Prussia, to Johann Georg Wortmann and Margaretha Elisabeth Plange. In 1721, Woortman applied for a job at the Dutch West India Company, and was stationed as soldier on the Dutch Gold Coast. Woortman made a swift career, becoming fort commandant and acting military commander, and retired to the Netherlands in 1730.

Woortman settled in Groningen, set up a grocery store, married Elisabeth Carrier, and founded a family. Probably because of personal financial problems, he returned to the Gold Coast in 1741. Because of his previous experience, he was installed as commandant Fort Lijdzaamheid soon after his arrival. Here he cassared a local African woman named Afodua or Aphodewa, with whom he would have six children. At Fort Lijdzaamheid, Woortman and Afodua led a profitable slave trade enterprise, which probably led him to delay his application for a higher office.

When he eventually did so in 1763, he would rise to the highest office of Director-General in four years time. Jan and Hendrik Woortman, sons from his Dutch marriage with Elisabeth Carrier joined him in his personal enterprise, later joined by sons from his relationship with Afodua. The combination of Woortman's contacts with the Company, and Afodua's contacts with the local people, proved very worthwhile.

Woortman died on 14 April 1780, at the age of 80.

== Legacy ==
Both Jan and Hendrik Woortman, sons of Pieter Woortman and Elisabeth Carrier, married women according to local rites during their service on the Gold Coast. Their offspring in male line in Ghana still carries the name Woortman.

The children of Pieter Woortman and Afodua carried the name Plange, after Pieter Woortman's mother. The Plange family would become one of the most prominent Euro-African families on the Gold Coast in the nineteenth century. Descendants include the English rugby league player David Plange, the Ghanaian boxer Manyo Plange, the Burkinabé footballer Nii Plange, and the Ghanaian fashion designer Mimi Plange.
