= John van der Puije =

Gold Coast merchant, newspaper publisher, traditional ruler and politician

- Born: 18 March 1848; Accra, Gold Coast
- Died: 12 September 1925 (aged 77); Accra, Gold Coast
- Occupations: merchant; newspaper publisher; traditional ruler; politician

John van der Puije (18 March 1848 – 12 September 1925) was a Gold Coast merchant, newspaper publisher, traditional ruler and politician. Between 1894 and 1904, he was appointed a member of the Legislative Council. He was also instrumental in the re-introduction of the Anglican Communion and English Freemasonry to the colony. He also lobbied the British colonial government to have greater African representation in the civil service in the late nineteenth century.

== Early life and education ==
John van der Puije was born in Ussher Town, Accra on 18 March 1848 to Jacobus van der Puije, a Euro-African and Naa Karley Ankrah, of the royal house of Otublohum or Otu's Quarter. His paternal grandfather was Jacobus van der Puije (1754–1781), a Dutch administrator who served as the governor of the Dutch Gold Coast in its capital, Elmina in 1780. John van der Puije attended the Accra Wesleyan School and the Dutch School for mulatto children at the Elmina Castle.

== Business and journalism ==
He became a general commodities merchant after completing his education. He was also involved in the cocoa trade. For a time, he was active in commerce in the eastern banks of the Volta River among the Anlo Ewe people. As his trade expanded, the paramount chief of Anlo Traditional Area made him one of his emissaries by to the British Governor, William Brandford Griffith who ruled the Gold Coast at various points between 1885 and 1894. His commercial interests took him to England few times. In 1892, while in Britain he received commission from the Liverpool-based company, Messrs. J. J. Fischer and Co. Ltd to set up a subsidiary in Ghana. The firm thrived in the Gold Coast colony and was tasked by a different English firm, Messrs. Pickering and Berthoud Ltd. to open a local branch on the Gold Coast.

He co-founded the Gold Coast Chronicle in 1880, together with his brother, Isaac van der Puije, an Accra merchant and member of the Legislative Council from 1893 to 1898, J. H. Cheetham, Timothy Laing, and the Pan-Africanist, J. E. Casely Hayford. John van der Puije chaired the newspaper's board.

== Chieftaincy and politics ==
He was enstooled the divisional chief of Otublohum, in Ussher Town Accra, of the Ga State on 12 September 1888. He was appointed the Eastern Province Representative to the governing body of the Aborigines’ Rights Protection Society (ARPS). After John Mensah Sarbah died in 1892, the English Governor, William Brandford Griffith selected John van der Puije as his replacement on the Gold Coast Legislative Council on 15 May 1894. In 1897, together with the African members of the Legislative Council and ARPS, he campaigned against the Lands Bill that would have expropriated indigenous land that was hitherto governed by the land tenure system. A coalition of local newspapers coordinated the opposition to the bill, culminating in a petition by a group of nationalists, including major financier, Jacob Wilson Sey to the then Secretary of State for the Colonies in London, Joseph Chamberlain, who served in this position from 1895 to 1903.

From 1901 to 1903, John van der Puije was elected a member of the Accra Town Council. He stepped down from his position on the Legislative Council in 1904 on account of illness. The president of ARPS at the time, J. P. Brown was appointed by the colonial governor to succeed van der Puije in the Legislative Council.

== Freemasonry and Anglicanism ==
In 1891, he was installed a Freemason in England. He was a member of the Royal Victorian Lodge in Accra. He switched from the Methodist Church to the Church of England. He persuaded the Anglican church to return to the Gold Coast in 1906 after a century and half of dormancy.

== Death ==
John van der Puije died on 12 September 1925 in Accra.
