= Enrique Díaz (musician) =

Colombian musician and songwriter (1945–2014)

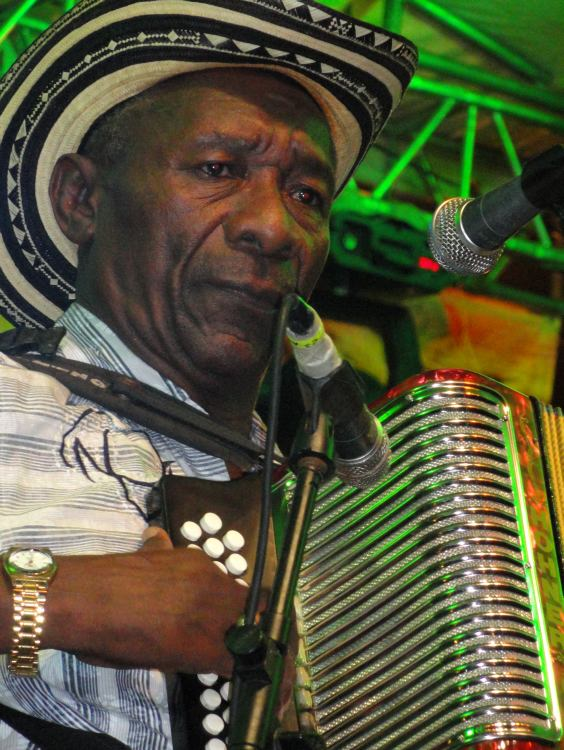

Background information
- Also known as: Tigre de María La Baja
- Born: Enrique Díaz Tovar; 3 April 1945; María La Baja, Colombia
- Died: 18 September 2014 (aged 69) Montería, Colombia
- Genres: vallenato

Enrique Díaz Tovar (3 April 1945 – 18 September 2014) was a Colombian musician and songwriter. The Foundation of the Festival de la Leyenda Vallenata called him a "great figure of authentic vallenato."

== Biography ==
Enrique Díaz was born on 3 April 1945 in María La Baja in Bolívar, Colombia. His mother was Marina Tovar.

As a young man, Díaz moved with his mother to Buenavista in Córdoba, where he learned to play violin and, from the age of 18, accordion and keyboard. Díaz' style on accordion was influenced by Luis Enrique Martínez and by Andrés Landero, whom he idolised. At the age of 22, he moved to Medellín, where he met Cástulo Padilla, who played guacharaca with him for 20 years. It was Padilla who convinced Otoniel Cardona, owner of Discos Victoria, to allow them to record their first record "Mujer Ingrata".

Díaz competed several times in the accordionist competition of the Festival de la Leyenda Vallenata, but never won. He was awarded the title of Rey Sabanero del Acordeón at the Festival Sabanero del Acordeón in Sincelejo.

Díaz was married to Elvira Peña, with whom he had 3 children. He died on 18 September 2014 in Montería. After his death, the Foundation of the Festival de la Leyenda Vallenata called him a "great figure of authentic vallenato."

== Compositions ==
Díaz wrote lyrics about "the daily life of the Caribbean man", particularly in Bolívar, Córdoba, and Sucre. His notable compositions include "El Rico Cují", "La Plata", and "En El Puerto". In 1969 Díaz had a significant hit with "La Caja Negra", which was written by Rafael Valencia.
