= Reynaldo Armas =

Venezuelan llanero singer and composer (born 1953)

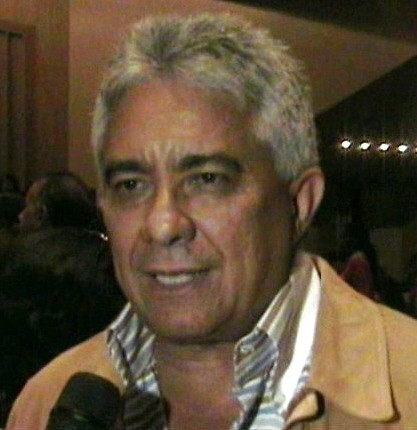

Background information
- Also known as: El Cardenal Sabanero
- Born: Reinaldo Armas Enguaima; August 4, 1953 (age 72); Guárico, Venezuela
- Genres: música llanera,
- Occupation: Singer-songwriter
- Years active: 1973–present
- Labels: Divensa; Sonográfica; Taguapica; Latin World

Reinaldo Armas Enguaima (born August 4, 1953), better known as Reynaldo Armas, is a Venezuelan singer and composer of música llanera.

== Discography ==
- La inspiración del poeta
- Cantor, poeta y pintor
- A usted
- No hay mal que dure 100 años
- Todo un señor
- En el bicentenario de Bolívar
- El amor más grande
- Pa' los muchachos
- Romántico
- A quien pueda interesar
- Mi credo
- Romance campesino
- Pa' que te acuerdes de mi
- Con mucho sentimiento
- El serenatero
- El amor y la vida
- Colosal
- Aquí está en cardenalito
- Genesis
- La manzana
- Reflexiones del año 2000
- Tu cantante favorito
- Copla, verso y canto
- El caballo de oro
- El vuelo
- El campeón
- Romántico Enamoramiento
- Látigo en mano
- La muerte del Rucio Moro
- Yo también quiero cantar
- La flor de la amistad
- El indio
- Entre muchachas y guarachas

== See also ==
- Venezuelan music
