= Un Fuego de Sangre Pura =

Un Fuego de Sangre Pura: Los Gaiteros de San Jacinto from Colombia

Studio album by Los Gaiteros de San Jacinto
- Released: 2006
- Genre: Cumbia, Porro
- Label: Smithsonian Folkways

Un Fuego de Sangre Pura is an album by the Colombian folkloric cumbia group Los Gaiteros de San Jacinto released in 2006 in the Smithsonian Folkways label. On November 9, 2007, the group won a Latin Grammy award in the Folkloric Music category.

== Track list ==
No.	Title	Length
1.	"Fuego de Cumbia"	5:24
2.	"Sigan Bailando"	2:23
3.	"El Manolo Los Gaiteros de San Jacinto"	4:37
4.	"El Millo se Modernizó"	3:51
5.	"Canto de Zafra"	5:09
6.	"El Corcovado"	3:52
7.	"Mi Regreso"	3:47
8.	"Puyaloahí"	2:45
9.	"La Celestina"	4:59
10.	"La Bajera"	3:30
11.	"Así Lo Grita Totó"	4:17
12.	"La Corniz"	4:09
13.	"Décima La Miseria Humana"	0:35
14.	"La Acabación"	2:48
