= Alfred Oko Vanderpuije =

Ghanaian politician

Hon. Alfred Oko Vanderpuije
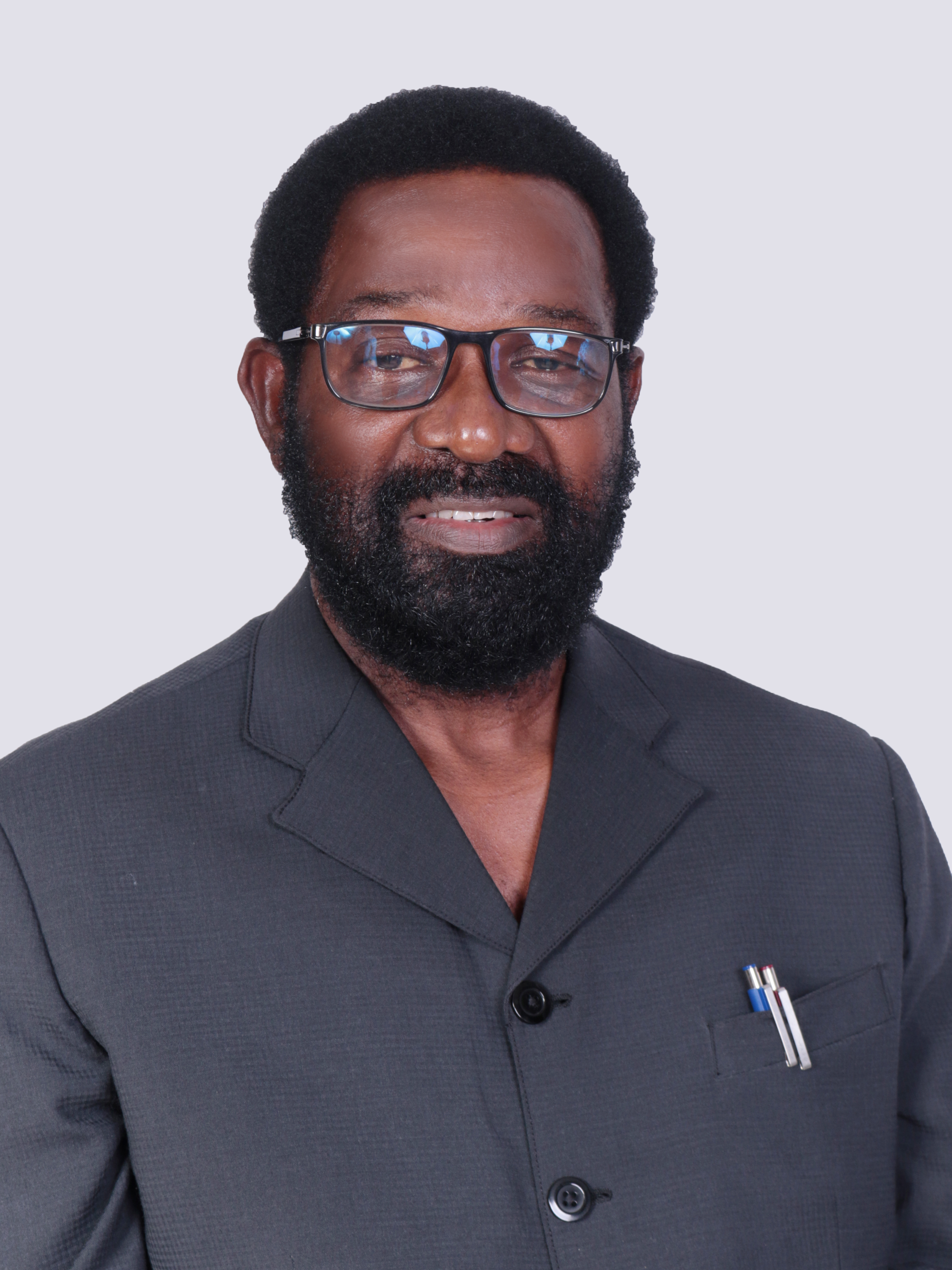

Member of the Ghana Parliament for Ablekuma South
- Incumbent
- Assumed office 7 January 2017
- Preceded by: Fritz Baffour

Mayor of Accra
- In office 2009–2017
- Preceded by: Stanley Nii Adjiri Blankson
- Succeeded by: Mohammed Nii Adjei Sowah

Personal details
- Born: Alfred Oko Vanderpuije; 4 November 1955 (age 70) Jamestown, Ghana
- Party: National Democratic Congress
- Spouse(s): Gifty Naa Adei Vanderpuije (m. 1982; died 2012); Cynthia Amerley Ayiku (m. 2019)
- Occupation: Politician

Alfred Oko Vanderpuije (born 4 November 1955) is a Ghanaian educationist and politician who currently serves as a member of parliament. He is currently the member of parliament for Ablekuma South Constituency in the Greater Accra Region of Ghana.

His Dutch surname reflects his Euro-African descent. The ancestors of Vanderpuije originally came from Sint-Maartensdijk on the former island of Tholen in the Netherlands. His ancestor, Jacobus van der Puije, was governor of the Dutch Gold Coast in 1780.

== Early life ==
A Jamestown native, he was born and bred at Mamprobi, Darkuman, and Dansoman at various stages of his childhood. Born on the 5th of November 1955.

== Education ==
Vanderpuije studied at Accra Teacher Training College for a 3-year Postsecondary degree in education. He holds a Masters in Education from Mid America Nazarene College and a Specialist in Education Administration from the University of Missouri, Kansas City, U.S.A.

== Political career ==
=== As Mayor of Accra ===
He was the former Mayor of Accra, installed in that office by President John Atta Mills in 2009 and he was maintained in that office by President John Dramani Mahama, completing his second term in 2017.

=== As Member of Parliament ===
Vanderpuije was elected to the Parliament of Ghana in the 2016 elections on the ticket of the National Democratic Congress (NDC) to represent the Ablekuma South Constituency in the Greater Accra Region for a four-year term. He won the elections with 31,927 votes out of the 59,041 valid votes cast representing 54.36% of the votes. As an MP, he is a member of Foreign Affairs Committee and House Committee of Parliament.

== Personal life ==
Vanderpuije lost his wife Gifty Naa Adei Vanderpuije in 2012, when she died at Korle-Bu Teaching Hospital. In 2019, Vanderpuije got remarried to Cynthia Amerley Ayiku after seven years of losing his wife.

== Legacy ==
On the night of Thursday 9 September 2021, he directed traffic on the Sakaman Junction to the Dansoman roundabout stretch. He decided to direct traffic when the police were absent. His actions brought relief to users using that road.

== Controversies ==
=== LGBTQ+ ===
Alfred Oko Vanderpuije, MP for Ablekuma South Constituency, in October 2021 reaffirmed Parliament's rejection of LGBTQ+ legalization in Ghana. He expressed the view that throughout Ghana's cultural history, the concept of same-sex marriage has been met with strong disapproval, transcending geographical and tribal distinctions. He emphasized that this deeply ingrained perspective is unlikely to undergo any fundamental shifts in the future. He emphasized anew that Ghana adheres to the conventional definition of marriage involving heterosexual couples, rejecting any contrary notions. He affirmed Ghana's decision against enacting laws that endorse LGBTQ+ rights, marking a distinction from the perspectives in the U.S. and Europe.

==== Others ====
In a Citi News interview, Mr. Vanderpuije, the Ablekuma South representative, pinpointed Accra's flooding as a critical issue for the nominee to address if confirmed. He urged Madam Elizabeth Sackey to cooperate with the Accra Regional Minister upon taking office.
