= Caja Agraria =

Colombian state financial entity

The Caja de Crédito Agrario, Industrial & Mines, better known as Caja Agraria, was a Colombian state financial entity founded in 1931. It went into liquidation in 1999, being privatized and replaced by The Agrarian Bank of Colombia or Banco Agrario de Colombia.

== History ==
Background

In 1927, the Banco Agrícola Hipotecario was created from the House of Representatives by project of Mariano Ospina Pérez.

Creation and characteristics

It was created with decree 1998 of 1931, in the government of Enrique Olaya Herrera, Law 57 of 1931 that established its duration of 50 years, for which in the government of Julio César Turbay it was granted an extension for an indefinite period. Its first office was located at Avenida Jiménez in Bogotá. It became one of the state entities with the most national presence together with Telecom. It had the largest number of employees of an entity in Colombia. Being the largest bank in the country, it became the financial institution with the largest network of offices (864) in 500 municipalities in Colombia. Its building was the first built on a metallic structure in Colombia. For several years, it was the official sponsor of the Tour of Colombia. It was a constant target in guerrilla takeovers during the internal armed conflict in Colombia.

Crisis and liquidation

The entity entered into crisis since 1989, for which it was liquidated in 1999. In 1991, it was the object of a million-dollar robbery in Bogotá. More than 70% of the large delinquent debtors of the bank were people not related to the field, and 30% were large farmers and ranchers.

Its replacement, Banco Agrario de Colombia, appeared on June 28, 1999.

Slogans

- Primero el campo (1982-1986) First the field
- Banco en la ciudad, fomento en el campo. La Caja Agraria si es Colombia (1986-1995) Bank in the city, development in the countryside. The Agrarian Fund is Colombia
- Su banco en todos los campos (1995-1999) Your bank in all fields

Predecessor: Banco Agrícola Hipotecario Mortgage Agricultural Agricultural Bank	Caja Agraria de ColombiaBanco Agrario de Colombia1931-1999	Successor: Banco Agrario de Colombia Agrarian Bank of Colombia
