= Stanley Nii Adjiri Blankson =

Ghanaian politician

Hon. Stanley Blankson

Mayor of Accra
- In office 2004–2009
- President: John Agyekum Kufour
- Preceded by: Solomon Adjei Darko
- Succeeded by: Alfred Vanderpuije

Member of Council of State
- Incumbent
- Assumed office 2017
- President: Nana Akuffo-Addo

Personal details
- Born: Stanley Nii Adjiri Blankson Ghana
- Party: New Patriotic Party
- Spouse: Florence Okai

Stanley Nii Adjiri Blankson is a Ghanaian politician and former mayor of the city of Accra. His mayoral term ended in January 2009 when he was replaced by Alfred Oko Vanderpuije. Since February 2017 he has been a member of Ghana's Council of State.

== Mayor of Accra ==
In February 2004 President John Agyekum Kufour named Blankson as the only candidate to contest the seat for Mayor of Accra. The election was conducted on the 25 February 2004 by the Electoral Commission of Ghana for the 102 assembly members to agree or disagree with the president's choice. At the end of voting, he obtained 80 votes which was 78% of valid votes cast.

He succeeded Solomon Adjei Darko, whose term as mayor was not renewed by the president. In his acceptance speech, Blankson promised to improve revenue collection and sanitation with the view of transforming Accra into a world-class city. He asked assembly members to work devoid of political affiliation in order to achieve their targets. Sheikh Ibrahim Cudjoe Quaye, the then Greater Accra Regional Minister who had acted as mayor, officially handed over the affairs of the Accra Metropolitan Assembly to Blankson with the expression of confidence in him alluding to the fact that: "the mayor was a disciplined, committed and dedicated man".

As mayor of Accra, Blankson embarked on decongestion exercises in various parts of the city to aid in the smooth flow of human and vehicular traffic. He also worked with commercial drivers to improve the general commuting experience by admonishing them to take their personal hygiene and city sanitation seriously.

Blankson served as mayor from February 2004 to January 2009, when the National Democratic Congress led by Professor John Evans Atta Mills came into power. Alfred Vanderpuije was appointed in his place.

== Council of State ==
In February 2017 President Nana Akuffo-Addo appointed Blankson as a member of the Council of state of Ghana. Blankson did not have to contest council elections since the President of Ghana has the right to appoint eleven people of his choice to the council. The other members of the council did have to contest regional elections to be elected to the council.

== Personal life ==
Blankson is married to Madam Florence Okai-Blankson.
