= Isaac Nii Djanmah Vanderpuye =

Ghanaian politician

Hon. Isaac Nii Djanmah Vanderpuye
- In office 2013–2017
- President: John Dramani Mahama

Personal details
- Born: Accra, Ghana
- Party: NDC

Isaac Nii Djanmah Vanderpuye is a Ghanaian politician and the deputy Greater Accra Regional Minister of Ghana from 2013 to 2017
