= Smiler (musician) =

British rapper and actor

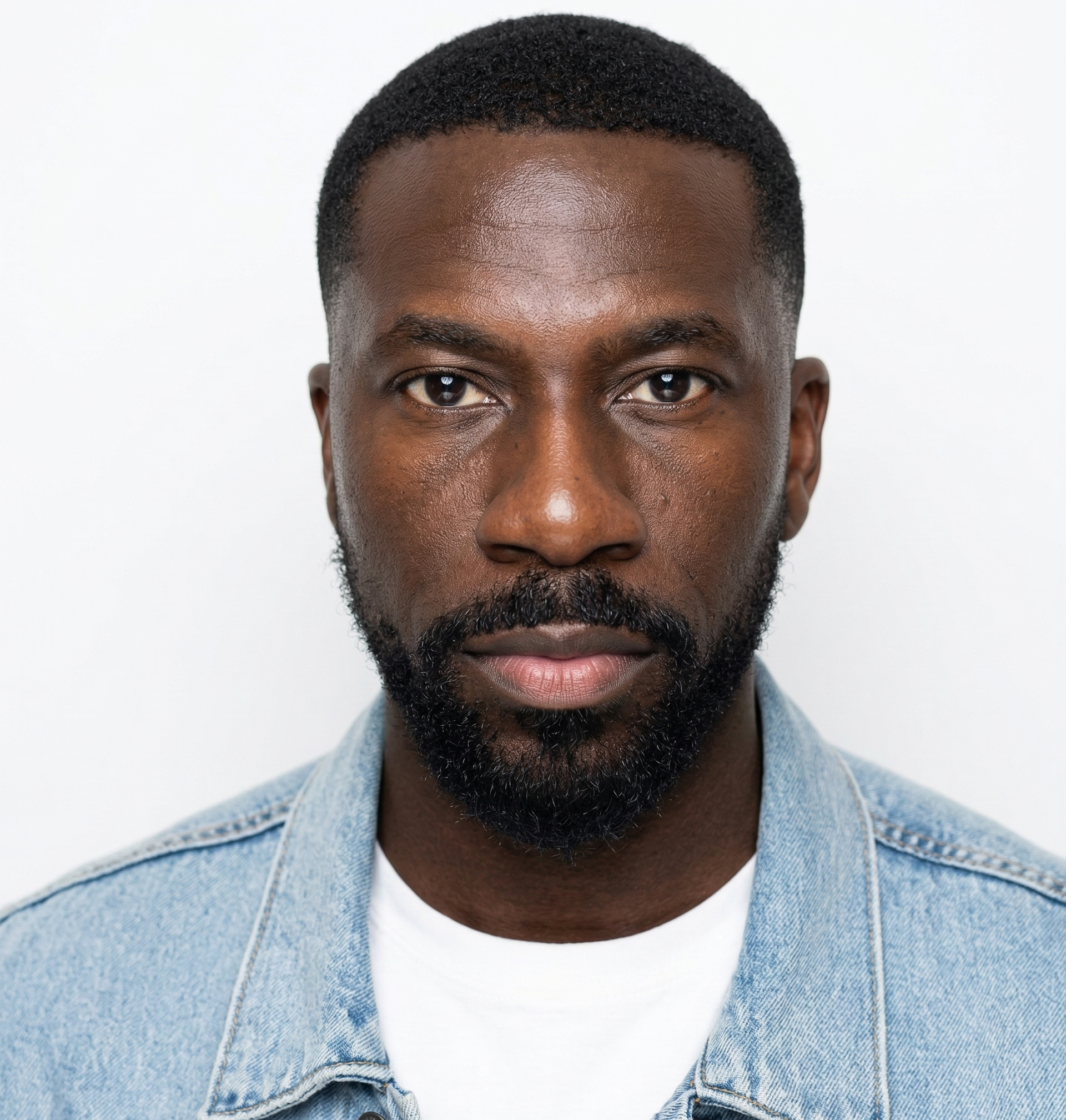
- Bartlett-Vanderpuye in profile

Background information
- Born: Joseph Nii Lante Bartlett-Vanderpuye; Greenwich, London, England
- Genres: British hip hop; UK rap
- Occupations: Rapper; Actor
- Instrument: Vocals
- Years active: 2009–present
- Labels: Warner Music (2012–2013)
- Website: smiler.com

Joseph Nii Lante Bartlett-Vanderpuye, better known by his stage name Smiler, is a British rapper and actor from London. Known first for his work in UK rap, including releases through Warner Music UK, he later expanded into screen acting, with credits including The Diamond Heist, MobLand, Slow Horses and Cardinal Burns.

== Career ==
=== Music ===
Bartlett-Vanderpuye began his music career with the mixtape Da Musical Omnibus in 2009. He followed this with the single "Enza" in 2010.

Producer Jakwob later invited him to contribute vocals to "Right Beside You", released in 2011. He later signed with Warner Music UK and released "Delorean" in March 2012, followed by "Rock Steady" and "Top of the World". "Top of the World" peaked at number 63 on the UK Singles Chart.

He collaborated with a number of artists during this period, including Lana Del Rey and Ed Sheeran. In 2012, Stereogum reported that Del Rey sang the hook on "Spender", a Smiler track set to appear on his mixtape All I Know. In 2013, Digital Spy reported that Sheeran's vocals appeared on Smiler's single "Brand New Style".

=== Acting ===
Bartlett-Vanderpuye later moved into screen acting. His credited work includes the Netflix title The Diamond Heist, the Paramount+ series MobLand, the Apple TV+ series Slow Horses and Channel 4's Cardinal Burns.

== Discography ==
=== Mixtapes ===
- Da Musical Omnibus (2009)
- Clarity (2010)
- All I Know (2012)
- The Coming (2013)
- Mark 4 Music (2022)

=== Singles ===
- "Enza" (2010)
- "Delorean" (featuring Wretch 32) (2012)
- "Rock Steady" (featuring Sneakbo) (2012)
- "Top of the World" (featuring Tawiah and Professor Green) (2012)
- "Brand New Style" (2013)

== Filmography ==
- The Diamond Heist
- MobLand
- Slow Horses
- Cardinal Burns
