= Yurumanguí River =

River in Colombia

- Location of mouth

Location
- Country: Colombia

Physical characteristics
- Mouth
  - coordinates: 3°24′49″N 77°21′26″W

The Yurumanguí River is a river of Colombia. It drains into the Pacific Ocean.

== See also ==
- List of rivers of Colombia
