= Mimi Plange =

Ghanaian born fashion designer

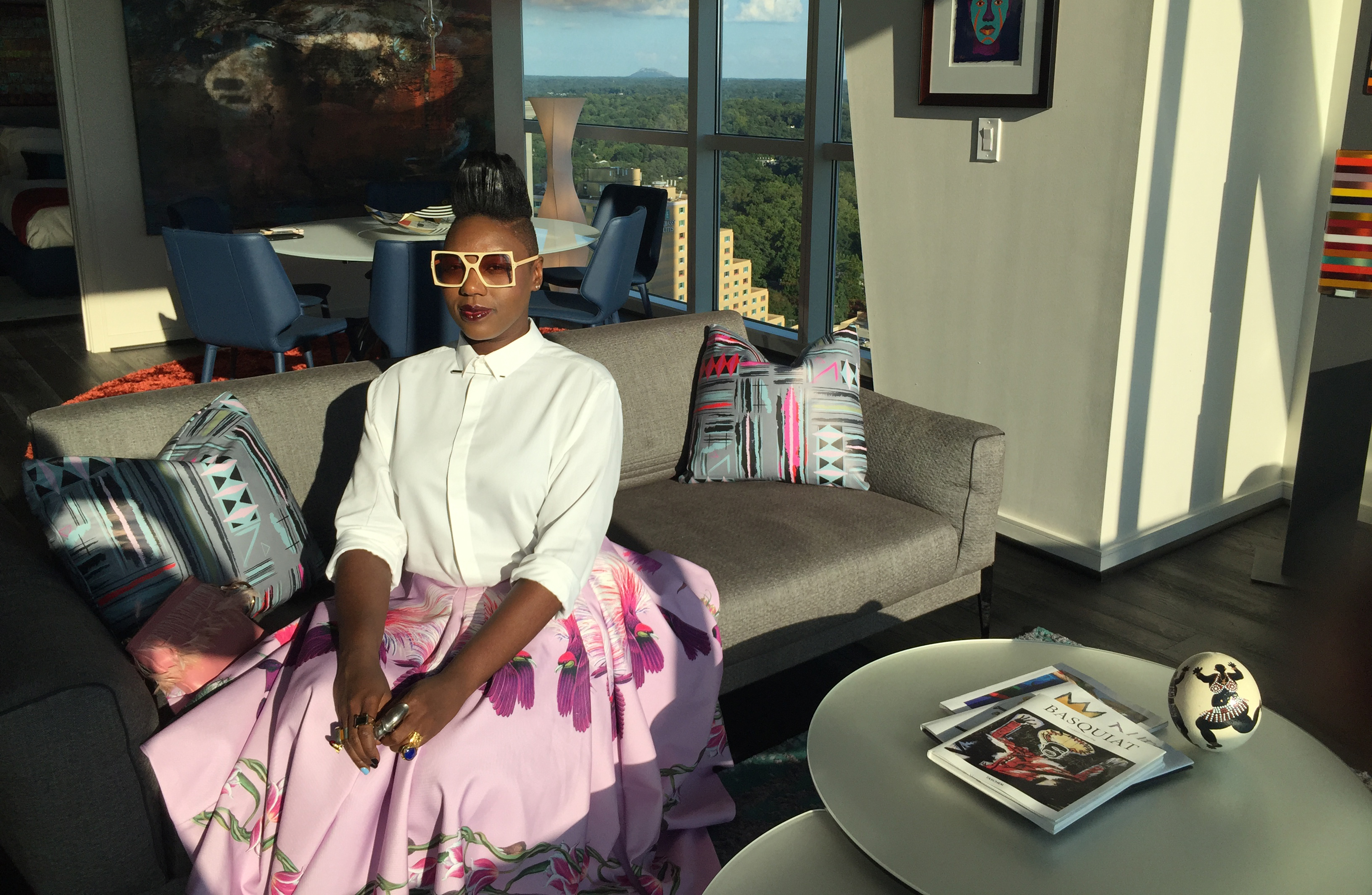
- Born: Accra, Ghana
- Education: Fashion Institute of Design and Merchandising (San Francisco)
- Alma mater: University of California at Berkeley
- Occupation: Fashion designer
- Partner: Ibrahim Ndoye
- Website: mimiplange.com

Mimi Plange is a Ghanaian-American fashion designer whose practice applies architectural construction principles to garment-making. Her work is held in the permanent collections of the Museum of Fine Arts, Boston, the SCAD Museum of Art, and the museum at the Fashion Institute of Technology.

== Early life and education ==
Plange was born in Accra, Ghana. She moved to California, United States, with her family when she was young. She grew up in Ontario and Rancho Cucamonga. She received a BA in Architecture from the University of California at Berkeley and attended the Fashion Institute of Design and Merchandising in San Francisco.

== Career ==
After her education, she moved to New York and worked for both Patricia Fields and Rachel Roy.

She and her business partner, Ibrahim Ndoye, created a fashion line called Boudoir D'huîtres but she later changed it to her own name Mimi Plange in 2010.

Her designs are influenced by African heritage. Her customers have included Rihanna and Serena Williams, as well as First Lady Michelle Obama, who wore her A-line skirt on the ABC TV show The View. Plange was the Designer of the Year at Mercedes Benz Fashion Week South Africa.

In a 2011 article in The New York Times, Plange was quoted as stating: "I want to prove to people that African fashion can't be pigeonholed.... I can compete globally." Plange does not use traditional African prints or textiles in her designs. In her Spring 2012 collection, Scarred Perfection, she referenced the body scars that Africans would use as a mode of tribal identification. Plange explains, "I am motivated by those things that make us question how we represent ourselves to other people."

In 2015, she collaborated with furniture designer Roche Bobois to create Mahjong tiles and sofas dressed with her materials that were made in Burkina Faso.
