= María La Baja =

Coordinates: 10°00′N 75°20′W

Maríalabaja
- Municipality and town
- Flag

- Location of the municipality and town of María La Baja in the Bolívar Department of Colombia
- Country: Colombia
- Department: Bolívar Department

Area
  - Municipality and town: 559.9 km^{2} (216.2 sq mi)
  - Urban: 2.91 km^{2} (1.12 sq mi)
- Elevation: 14 m (46 ft)

Population (2018 census)
  - Municipality and town: 46,112
  - Urban: 20,451
  - Urban density: 7,030/km^{2} (18,200/sq mi)
- Time zone: UTC-5 (Colombia Standard Time)

Maríalabaja is a town and municipality located in the Bolívar Department, northern Colombia.

== History ==
Initially, the area was part of the province of Mahates, where the palenque of San Pablo was located. In 1776, the governor of Cartagena de Indias commissioned Lieutenant Antonio de la Torre y Miranda to gather the inhabitants of what is now Maríalabaja; in this area he founded the towns of Santa Rosa de Flamenco (March 23, 1776) and San José de Jolojolo (March 25, 1776; possibly located where the municipal seat now stands). However, the latter was not entirely successful: Jolojolo later disappeared without a trace in the Dique region, and Flamenco barely survived as a small village.

During the federal era, the area was part of the Province of Mahates and later of the Province of Cartagena. In the 20th century, the municipality of María La Baja was created. Between 1965 and 1970, the Maríalabaja irrigation system was built.

== Geography and climate ==
The municipality of Maríalabaja has a total area of 547 km², bordering to the north with the municipality of Arjona, to the east with the municipalities of Mahates and San Juan Nepomuceno, south with the municipalities of El Carmen de Bolívar and San Jacinto and to the west with the municipality of San Onofre, Sucre. The town of María La Baja has an area of approximately 150 km². It is some 72 km away from the Department's capital Cartagena.

A warm climate prevails throughout the year at an average temperature of 28 °C.

Climate data for María La Baja (Nueva Florida), elevation 13 m (43 ft), (1981–2010)
| Month | Jan | Feb | Mar | Apr | May | Jun | Jul | Aug | Sep | Oct | Nov | Dec | Year |
|---|---|---|---|---|---|---|---|---|---|---|---|---|---|
| Mean daily maximum °C (°F) | 33.9 (93.0) | 34.1 (93.4) | 34.2 (93.6) | 33.8 (92.8) | 32.8 (91.0) | 32.8 (91.0) | 33.0 (91.4) | 33.0 (91.4) | 32.4 (90.3) | 32.0 (89.6) | 32.1 (89.8) | 32.8 (91.0) | 33.1 (91.6) |
| Daily mean °C (°F) | 26.8 (80.2) | 27.3 (81.1) | 27.5 (81.5) | 27.7 (81.9) | 27.7 (81.9) | 27.6 (81.7) | 27.5 (81.5) | 27.3 (81.1) | 26.9 (80.4) | 26.7 (80.1) | 26.8 (80.2) | 26.7 (80.1) | 27.2 (81.0) |
| Mean daily minimum °C (°F) | 20.8 (69.4) | 21.4 (70.5) | 22.2 (72.0) | 23.3 (73.9) | 23.8 (74.8) | 23.4 (74.1) | 23.0 (73.4) | 22.9 (73.2) | 22.7 (72.9) | 22.7 (72.9) | 22.9 (73.2) | 21.7 (71.1) | 22.6 (72.7) |
| Average precipitation mm (inches) | 19.3 (0.76) | 28.9 (1.14) | 41.6 (1.64) | 126.0 (4.96) | 180.0 (7.09) | 186.5 (7.34) | 194.1 (7.64) | 197.7 (7.78) | 186.1 (7.33) | 191.8 (7.55) | 179.5 (7.07) | 74.2 (2.92) | 1,542.6 (60.73) |
| Average precipitation days (≥ 1.0 mm) | 2 | 3 | 4 | 10 | 12 | 13 | 14 | 14 | 13 | 14 | 13 | 6 | 112 |
| Average relative humidity (%) | 83 | 82 | 80 | 83 | 85 | 85 | 85 | 85 | 87 | 87 | 86 | 85 | 84 |
| Mean monthly sunshine hours | 248.0 | 203.3 | 189.1 | 159.0 | 139.5 | 141.0 | 167.4 | 158.1 | 126.0 | 130.2 | 147.0 | 210.8 | 2,019.4 |
| Mean daily sunshine hours | 8.0 | 7.2 | 6.1 | 5.3 | 4.5 | 4.7 | 5.4 | 5.1 | 4.2 | 4.2 | 4.9 | 6.8 | 5.5 |
Source: Instituto de Hidrologia Meteorologia y Estudios Ambientales

Climate data for María La Baja (San Pablo), elevation 20 m (66 ft), (1981–2010)
| Month | Jan | Feb | Mar | Apr | May | Jun | Jul | Aug | Sep | Oct | Nov | Dec | Year |
|---|---|---|---|---|---|---|---|---|---|---|---|---|---|
| Mean daily maximum °C (°F) | 34.0 (93.2) | 34.5 (94.1) | 34.4 (93.9) | 34.5 (94.1) | 32.9 (91.2) | 33.0 (91.4) | 33.1 (91.6) | 33.1 (91.6) | 32.7 (90.9) | 32.0 (89.6) | 32.2 (90.0) | 33.0 (91.4) | 33.3 (91.9) |
| Daily mean °C (°F) | 27.3 (81.1) | 27.9 (82.2) | 28.2 (82.8) | 28.2 (82.8) | 27.8 (82.0) | 27.9 (82.2) | 27.8 (82.0) | 27.8 (82.0) | 27.4 (81.3) | 27.0 (80.6) | 27.1 (80.8) | 27.1 (80.8) | 27.6 (81.7) |
| Mean daily minimum °C (°F) | 21.6 (70.9) | 22.2 (72.0) | 23.0 (73.4) | 23.8 (74.8) | 23.9 (75.0) | 23.8 (74.8) | 23.5 (74.3) | 23.4 (74.1) | 23.5 (74.3) | 23.3 (73.9) | 23.2 (73.8) | 22.3 (72.1) | 23.1 (73.6) |
| Average precipitation mm (inches) | 18.6 (0.73) | 23.4 (0.92) | 49.0 (1.93) | 124.8 (4.91) | 190.6 (7.50) | 183.8 (7.24) | 184.0 (7.24) | 230.3 (9.07) | 215.5 (8.48) | 237.8 (9.36) | 173.9 (6.85) | 93.5 (3.68) | 1,725.4 (67.93) |
| Average precipitation days (≥ 1.0 mm) | 2 | 3 | 4 | 11 | 16 | 16 | 15 | 17 | 16 | 17 | 15 | 8 | 133 |
| Average relative humidity (%) | 79 | 75 | 75 | 78 | 83 | 82 | 81 | 83 | 84 | 85 | 85 | 82 | 81 |
| Mean monthly sunshine hours | 257.3 | 220.2 | 201.5 | 174.0 | 151.9 | 165.0 | 189.1 | 179.8 | 141.0 | 145.7 | 162.0 | 223.2 | 2,210.7 |
| Mean daily sunshine hours | 8.3 | 7.8 | 6.5 | 5.8 | 4.9 | 5.5 | 6.1 | 5.8 | 4.7 | 4.7 | 5.4 | 7.2 | 6.1 |
Source: Instituto de Hidrologia Meteorologia y Estudios Ambientales

== Involvement in armed conflict ==
Maríalabaja has grown substantially in recent years as some 7,000 people have moved into the town from the surrounding countryside since 2000, when the FARC guerrilla group arrived in the hills nearby. According to reports the FARC militants stole cattle. The situation deteriorated further when AUC paramilitaries began to battle FARC, catching civilians in the crossfire. However the security situation has improved with the AUC bloc Heroes de los Montes de María giving up their weapons on July 14, 2005, under a national demobilization plan speared by the government of Álvaro Uribe. Marines have set up a base on the edge of the town.

== Notable people ==
- Ceferina Banquez (1943–2023), bullerengue singer
- Enrique Díaz (1945–2014), vallenato accordionist
- Pabla Flores (born 1955), bullerengue singer
- Jesús Marimón (born 1998), professional footballer
- Jáder Obrian (born 1995), professional footballer
