= San Martín de Loba =

Coordinates: 8°50′N 73°55′W

- Municipality and town
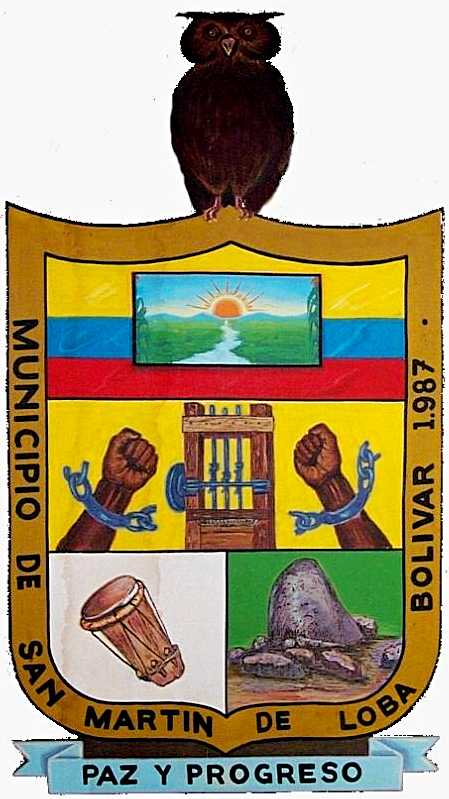
- Coat of arms

- Location of the municipality and town of San Martín de Loba in the Bolívar Department of Colombia
- Country: Colombia
- Department: Bolívar Department

Area
  - Total: 742 km^{2} (286 sq mi)

Population (Census 2018)
  - Total: 14,504
  - Density: 19.5/km^{2} (50.6/sq mi)
- Time zone: UTC-5 (Colombia Standard Time)

San Martín de Loba is a town and municipality located in the Bolívar Department, northern Colombia.
