= Irene Martínez (singer) =

Colombian singer and songwriter

- Also known as: La Niña Irene
- Born: Irene Martínez Mejía; 31 December 1923; Gamero, Mahates, Colombia
- Died: 23 August 1993 (aged 69) Gamero, Mahates, Colombia
- Genres: Bullerengue
- Years active: 1979–1992

Irene Martínez Mejía (Note: In this Spanish name, the first or paternal surname is Martínez and the second or maternal family name is Mejía.) (1923–1993), also known as La Niña Irene, was a Colombian bullerengue singer and songwriter. She was the lead singer of the group Los Soneros de Gamero for 13 years, with whom she helped to popularise bullerengue as a commercially successful genre in Colombia.

== Biography ==
Martínez was born on 31 December 1923 in Gamero, in the corregimiento of Mahates in the Colombian department of Bolívar.

In August 1979, Martínez and musician Wady Bedrán formed the bullerengue group Los Soneros de Gamero. Bedrán had heard Martínez singing with her cousin Emilia Herrera at a wake, and invited them both to form a group. Los Soneros de Gamero had a hit with their first single "El Lobo", and went on to release 17 albums. Martínez sang lead vocals, and other members included Magín Díaz and occasionally Herrera. Martínez also wrote songs for the group, though she was illiterate. Radio Nacional de Colombia wrote that Martínez and Herrera were at the beginning of "a phenomenon of commercial modernisation of bullerengue, tambora, and sung dances."

Martínez wrote 40 songs, mostly in the genre of bullerengue. Her notable compositions include "Yo Quiero Bailar", "La Chalupa", and "Trucaneto".

Martínez stopped singing in 1992, and was later diagnosed with throat cancer. She died on 23 August 1993, at home in Gamero.

== Albums with Los Soneros de Gamero ==
- Candela Viva! (1980)
- Cógele el Rabo (1981)
- Chispa Candela (1982)
- Raspacanilla (1983)
- Sambatá (1984)
- Bailando (1985)
- Esta Sabroso! (1986)
- Mambé (1987)
- Botando Candela (1988)
- La Penca del Carnaval (1989)
- La Montá (1990)
- Pa' Parrandea' (1991)
