= Totó la Momposina =

Colombian musician (1940–2026)

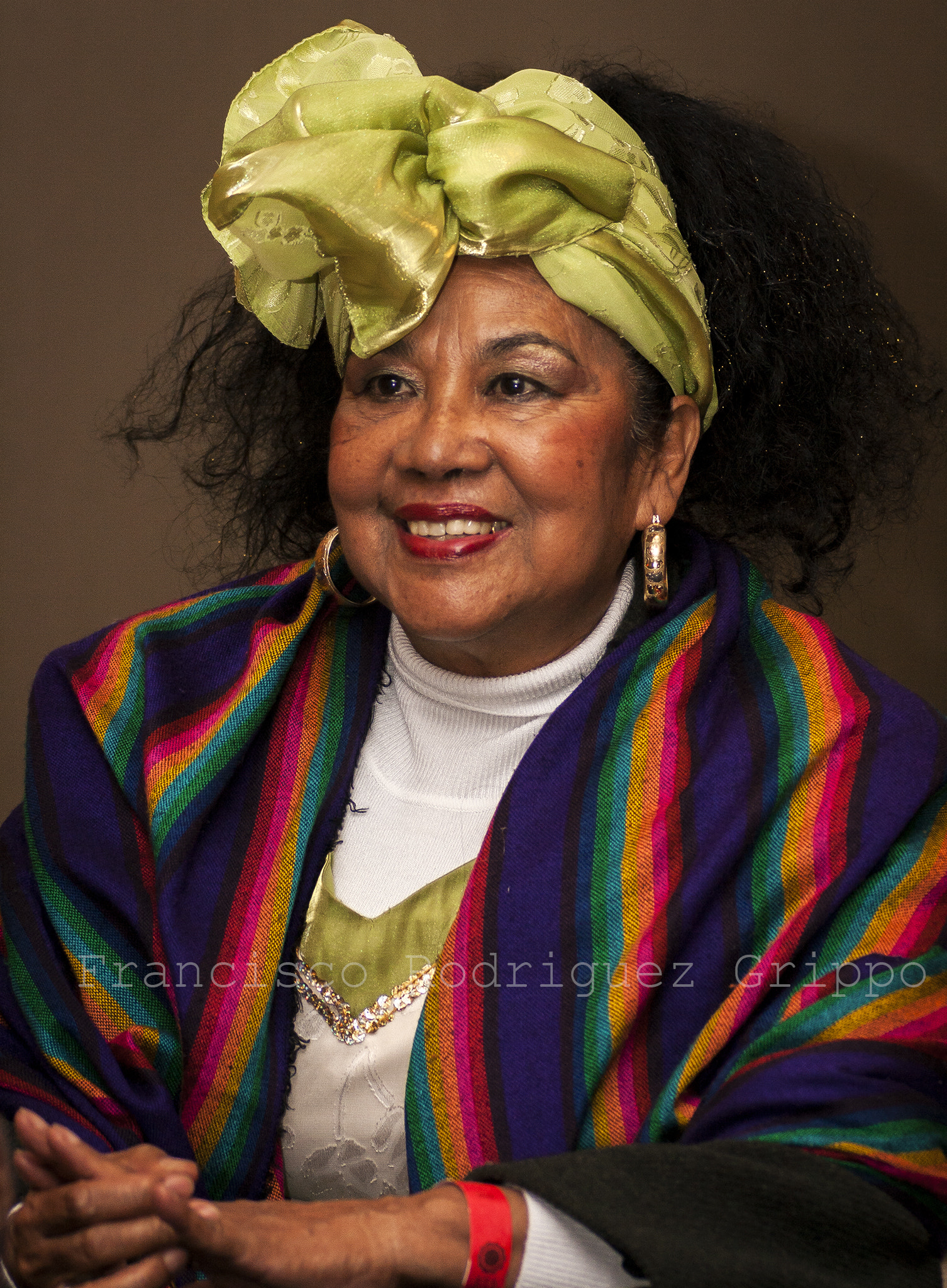

Background information
- Born: Sonia Bazanta Vides; 1 August 1940; Talaigua Nuevo, Bolívar Department, Colombia
- Died: 17 May 2026 (aged 85) Celaya, Guanajuato, Mexico
- Genres: Cumbia, Bullerengue, Porro, Chalupa
- Occupations: Musician, songwriter
- Instrument: Vocals
- Years active: 1964–2022
- Labels: Real World Records, Astar Artes Recordings
- Website: totolamomposina.com

Sonia Bazanta Vides (1 August 1940 – 17 May 2026), better known as Totó la Momposina, was a Colombian singer of Afro-Colombian and Indigenous descent. She reached international attention with the release of her 1993 album La Candela Viva on Peter Gabriel's Real World Records label. Totó accompanied Gabriel García Márquez to receive the Nobel Prize in Literature in 1982 as part of a Colombian cultural delegation performing during the award ceremony.

== Life and career ==
Totó was born in the northern Colombian town of Talaigua Nuevo, near Mompox in Bolívar Department, on 1 August 1940. She was part of the fourth generation of her family to be involved in music. Her father was a drummer and her mother was a singer and dancer.

She studied at the National University of Colombia. She then studied for a year at the Sorbonne in Paris.

Totó received the Latin Grammy Lifetime Achievement Award in 2013.

In 2017, she was awarded an honorary doctorate from the National Pedagogic University in Colombia.

Totó la Momposina died in Celaya, Guanajuato, Mexico, on 17 May 2026, at the age of 85.

== Discography ==
- Cantadora (MTM Auvidisc, 1983)
- Colombia – Totó La Momposina y sus Tambores (Auvidis 4513, 1989)
- La Candela Viva (Real World Records 31, 1992)
- Carmelina (MTM, 1995)
- Pacantó (Colombia: MTM/Europe:Nuevos Medios/USA: World Village, 2000)
- La Bodega (Astar Artes 2010)
- El Asunto (Sony Music Entertainment Colombia S.A.Bajo licencia de Sonia Bazanta 2014)
- Tambolero (RealWorld Record 2015)
- Compilations
- Gaitas y Tambores (MTM 2002)
- Tambores y Cantos (MTM 2013)

Notable usage

- Michel Cleis feat – Totó La Momposina – La Mezcla – samples tracks "El Pescador" and "Curura" from the La Candela Viva album (2009)
- Two songs from La Candela Viva were included on the soundtrack of the 1997 movie Jungle 2 Jungle.
- Her song "La Verdolaga" was sampled on Rich Boy's "Get to Poppin'" produced by Brian Kidd. It has also been sampled by Jay Z for the song "Blue's Freestyle/We Family" on his 4:44 album. The song featured his daughter Blue Ivy Carter. The track was released as a bonus song several weeks after the albums original public release.
- Two of her songs, "La Verdolaga" and "Mohana", were featured in the soundtrack for John Sayles' 1997 movie, Men With Guns.
- Her song "La Verdolaga" was covered on P18 (band)'s "Urban Cuban'" in 1999.
- Her 1993 Colombian cumbia classic "Curura" was sampled by Major Lazer featuring J Balvin in the song titled "Que Calor".
- Her songs "El Pescador" and "Curura" were once again sampled in the 2023 song "Curura" released on Belgian label Smash The House by Wolfpack, Jaxx & Vega and DJ Junior. It was premiered by Dimitri Vegas & Like Mike four years earlier on Tomorrowland.
- Her song "Rosa" was sampled in 2024 by Iranian-Dutch artist Sevdaliza in her single "Alibi" also featured Brazilian singer Pabllo Vittar and French singer-songwriter Yseult.

== Awards and nominations ==
=== Grammy Awards ===
| Year | Nominee / work | Award | Result |
|---|---|---|---|
| 2015 | El Asunto | Best Tropical Latin Album | Nominated |

=== Latin Grammy Awards ===
Totó la Momposina has two Latin Grammy awards from four nominations for her collaboration with the urban group Calle 13 on their song "Latinoamérica", receiving in 2013 the lifetime achievement award.

| Year | Nominee / work | Award | Result |
|---|---|---|---|
| 2000 | Pacantó | Best Folk Album | Nominated |
| 2002 | Pacantó | Best Traditional Tropical Album | Nominated |
| 2009 | La Bodega | Best Traditional Tropical Album | Nominated |
| 2011 | "Latinoamérica" | Record of the Year | Won |
| 2011 | "Latinoamérica" | Song of the Year | Won |
| 2013 | Special Awards | Lifetime Achievement Award | Won |
| 2014 | El Asunto | Best Folk Album | Nominated |

=== Premios Nuestra Tierra ===
A Premio Nuestra Tierra is an accolade that recognizes outstanding achievement in the Colombian music industry. Totó la Momposina received a nomination.

| Year | Nominee / work | Award | Result |
|---|---|---|---|
| 2014 | "La Candela Viva" (with Jorge Celedón) | Best Folk Performance of the Year | Nominated |

== See also ==
- Music of Colombia
