= Bullerengue =

Music genre

- Stylistic origins: African percussion
- Cultural origins: African slaves, Maroons and Amerindian tribes in the Caribbean Region of Colombia.
- Typical instruments: Percussion and woodwind; drums, claves, güiro, Gaita flutes and maracas.

Bullerengue is a traditional & old musical genre and dance from the Caribbean region of Colombia and the Darién Province in Panama In Central America. It is sung and preserved primarily by elderly women or does of old age, accompanied by local artisan drums, and developed in the Palenques or Maroon communities.

Bullerengue continues to be practiced along Colombia’s Caribbean coast, particularly in rural Afro-Colombian communities. It is commonly performed at local festivals, family events, and community celebrations. Although the genre was historically transmitted informally, recent academic research and cultural initiatives have brought increased recognition to bullerengue and its performers.

== History ==
Bullerengue developed along Colombia’s Caribbean coast in Afro-descendant communities whose cultural practices grew out of maroon settlements and life after emancipation. The genre is commonly linked to palenque communities formed by formerly enslaved Africans, where music and dance were part of everyday social life and community gatherings.

Over time, the tradition became closely tied to towns in the Bolívar region, especially María La Baja and nearby coastal communities where it remained a central part of local cultural life. Songs and performance styles were typically learned within families and performed at celebrations, festivals, and neighborhood events. Much of the early history of bullerengue has been preserved through community memory and later folkloric research rather than early written documentation.

By the mid-twentieth century, bullerengue was still practiced mainly in rural coastal communities and had limited national visibility. Early documentation came through folkloric research and field recordings, which began to record performances and local traditions that had previously circulated only within communities. Later cultural festivals and recording projects helped bring greater attention to the genre and to the singers who preserved it within their communities.

== Musical Characteristics ==
Bullerengue is a music and dance tradition that combines singing, percussion, and dance and reflects influences from West African musical practices. Performances typically involve a lead singer, responding chorus, drummers, and dancers who participate collectively in the performance. The genre is commonly accompanied by hand drums and clapping, with rhythms that support both singing and dance.

The singing structure usually begins with a solo vocal introduction in which the lead singer presents the main melodic theme before percussion and chorus enter. Once the chorus joins, the performance develops through alternating lines between the lead singer and group responses, accompanied by clapping, drums, and dance. Traditional ensembles typically include hand-played drums that guide tempo and support interaction between singers and dancers. This call-and-response format allows for flexibility and variation during performance and reflects the communal nature of the genre.

Improvisation plays an important role in bullerengue singing. Lead vocalists frequently create verses during the performance itself, often reacting to the audience or the moment while still following established rhythmic patterns. Many songs rely on short musical phrases that are repeated and slightly altered as the performance unfolds, allowing space for interaction between the lead singer and the chorus.

Singers also use techniques such as vocal ornamentation, shouted calls, and changes in rhythm to give each performance its own character. These vocal elements work alongside drumming, clapping, and dance, creating a setting where participation is encouraged. Rather than separating performers from the audience, bullerengue performances often blur those boundaries, with multiple participants shaping the overall structure.

== Artists ==
Some renowned bullerengue singers are Graciela Salgado, Petrona Martínez, Irene Martínez, Emilia Herrera, Estefanía Caycedo, Etelvina Maldonado, and Ceferina Banquez. In recent decades, Petrona Martínez and Totó la Momposina have increased bullerengue's international popularity and success, the former having been granted the Latin Grammy Award for Best Folk Album.
