= Petrona Martínez =

Colombian bullerengue singer (born 1939)

Petrona Martínez (born 27 January 1939) is a Colombian singer-songwriter of bullerengue, native music of the Colombian Caribbean. Her album Ancestras earned her the 2021 Latin Grammy Award for Best Folk Album.

== Career ==
Martínez is a recording artist. She has toured Denmark, England, France, United States, Morocco, and other countries.

She has received two nominations and a win at the Latin Grammy Awards for Best Folk Album, first in 2002 for her album Bonito Que Canta, then in 2010 for her album Las Penas Alegres, and in finally in 2021 for Ancestras, which won. The latter has collaborations with 14 women of African descent including Susana Baca, Angélique Kidjo, Nidia Góngora, Aymée Nuviola, Vânia França, and Flor de Toloache. The album was produced by Manuel García-Orozco and Mayte Montero for the independent label Chaco World Music.

After performing and recording music for a number of years, a 1998 concert in Bogotá brought her national recognition in Colombia.

Her influences in the bullerengue tradition come her grandmother, Orfelina Martínez, her great-grandmother, Carmen Silva, and many other women in her native San Cayetano.
