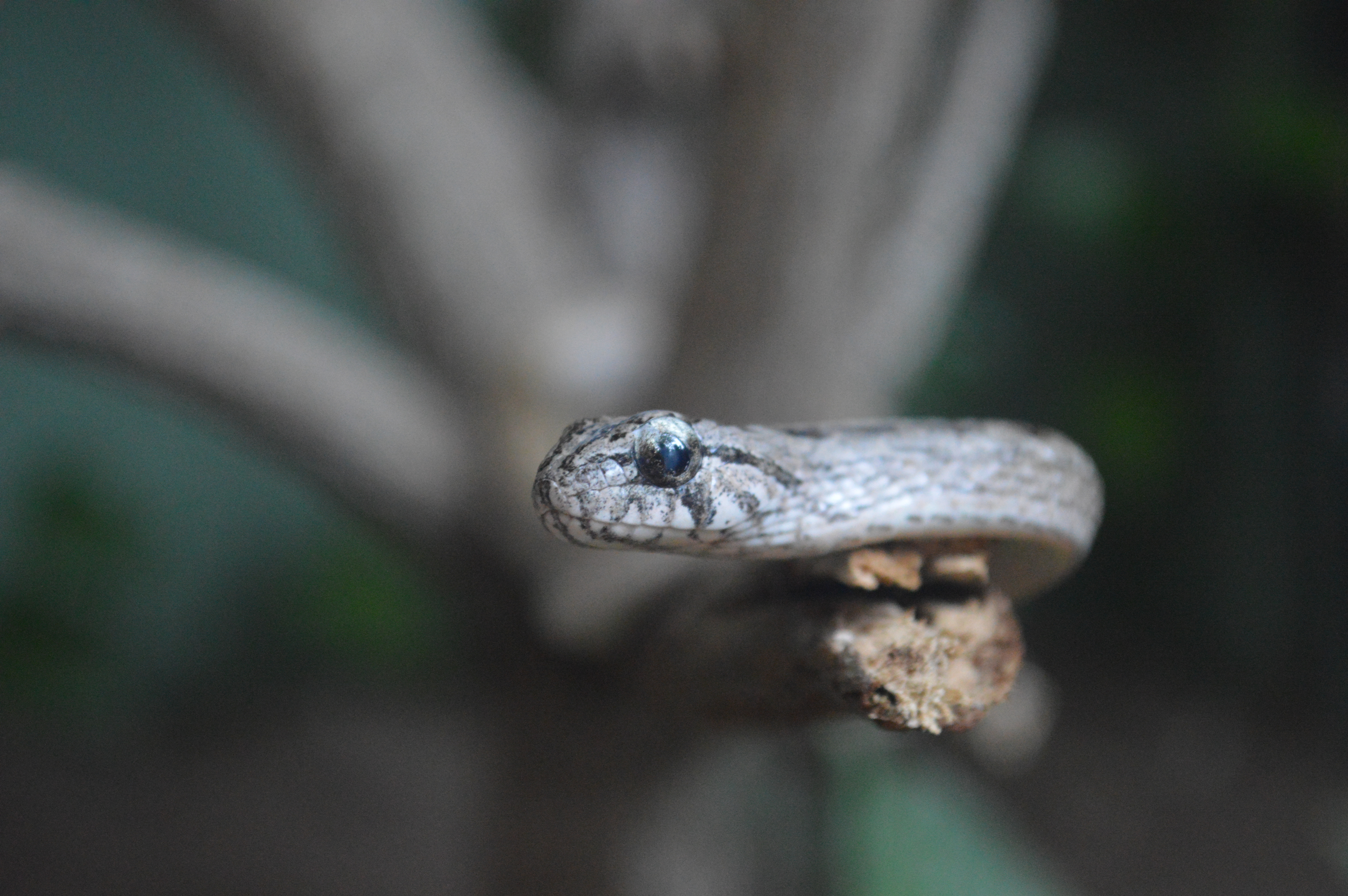

Conservation status
- Least Concern (IUCN 3.1)

Scientific classification
- Kingdom: Animalia
- Phylum: Chordata
- Class: Reptilia
- Order: Squamata
- Suborder: Serpentes
- Family: Colubridae
- Genus: Dryophylax
- Species: D. paraguanae

Binomial name
- Dryophylax paraguanae Bailey & Thomas, 2007

= Dryophylax paraguanae =

Species of reptile

Dryophylax paraguanae is a species of snake in the family Colubridae. The species is endemic to Venezuela and Colombia.

== Etymology ==
This species is named after its type locality, the Península de Paraguaná in Falcón state, Venezuela. The name is synonymous with Thamnodynastes paraguanae.

== Description ==
Dryophylax paraguanae features weakly keeled dorsal scales arranged in 19-19-15 configuration. Its hemipenis is slender anc lacks spines. The maxillary teeth are typically arranged in 13+2G format, and its infralabials and chin is usually heavily pigmented. It has fewer ventrals and subcaudals than neighboring species like D. nattereri and D. gambotensis.

== Habitat ==
This species is native to Venezuela (Falcón) and Colombia (Magdalena). Its place of origin is Norte de Paraguana, Falcón State.

== Life cycle ==
Snakes of this species follow a ovoviparous mode of reproduction.
