= Dryophylax ceibae =

Conservation status
- Data Deficient (IUCN 3.1)

Scientific classification
- Kingdom: Animalia
- Phylum: Chordata
- Class: Reptilia
- Order: Squamata
- Suborder: Serpentes
- Family: Colubridae
- Genus: Dryophylax
- Species: D. ceibae

Binomial name
- Dryophylax ceibae Bailey & Thomas, 2007

Species of snake

Dryophylax ceibae is a species of snake in the family Colubridae. The species is endemic to Venezuela.

== Etymology ==
This species is named for its type locality, La Ceiba, Trujillo, Venenzuela.

It is also referred to as Thermodynastes ceibae.

== Description ==
D caibae is a slender snake, featuring weakly keeled dorsal scales, arranged in 19-19-13 rows. It has a divided cloacal plate, and its hemipenis is short and slender, lacking noticeable ornamentation. It has 19 maxillary teeth with two enlarged teeth (19+ 2G).

== Habitat and behavior ==
The snake is native to Venezuela, occurring near sea-level, especially in La Ceiba, Trujillo.

== Life cycle ==
They have a ovoviparous reproductive system.
