= Amazon coastal house snake =

There are two species of snake named Amazon coastal house snake:

- Dryophylax nattereri
- Thamnodynastes pallidus
