= Jeimy Arrieta =

Colombian accordionist

- Born: Jeimy de Jesús Arrieta Ramos; 1996 or 1997 (age 28–29); Arjona, Colombia
- Genres: Vallenato
- Years active: 2006–present

Jeimy de Jesús Arrieta Ramos (Note: In this Spanish name, the first or paternal surname is Arrieta and the second or maternal family name is Ramos.) (born 1996 or 1997) is a Colombian accordionist. She won the child accordionist competition of the Vallenato Legend Festival in 2007, and was crowned vallenato queen for winning the acordeonera mayor competition in 2020. In 2026 she won the professional accordionist competition of the Encuentro Vallenato Femenino.

== Biography ==
Jeimy de Jesús Arrieta Ramos was born in 1996 or 1997 in Arjona, in the Colombian department of Bolívar. Her brother, father, and grandfather are all accordionists, and her sister Sandra plays the caja.

Arrieta started learning to play accordion at the age of 7. She first competed in the child accordionist competition of the Vallenato Legend Festival in 2006, and she won in 2007. In 2017 she appeared as Cecilia Meza Reales in the telenovela La Cacica.

In 2019, the Vallenato Legend Festival split the accordionist competitions by gender for the first time, and Arrieta competed in the acordeonera mayor competition, whose winner is given the title of vallenato queen. She competed again in 2020 and won, becoming the second vallenato queen after Loraine Lara. She was accompanied by Alberto Camacho on caja and Jorge Luis Daza on guacharaca. Arrieta won the professional accordionist competition of the Encuentro Vallenato Femenino in 2026, ahead of Angie Corzo and Sara Rhenals. Arrieta has also won accordion competitions at several other Colombian festivals, including the Bolivarense Accordion Festival and the Mar de Acordeones Festival.

In 2021, Arrieta released the EP Los Cuatro Aires with vallenato singer Iván Villazón. Villazón claimed to have conceived of the project while judging at the 2020 Vallenato Legend Festival, as a "tribute to the winner, Jeimy Arrieta...in order to give my full support to the women's movement that is taking place in vallenato music, which is very strong."
