= No Me Compares Con Nadie =

Studio album by Silvestre Dangond and Juancho De la Espriella
- Released: August 31, 2011
- Genre: Vallenato
- Label: Sony Music Colombia
- Producer: Lucho Ortega

Silvestre Dangond albums chronology
| Cantinero (2010) | No Me Compares Con Nadie (2011) | La 9a Batalla (2013) |

Singles from No Me Compares Con Nadie
- 1. "Mi Amor Eres Tú" Released: September 2011; 2. "La Gringa" Released: December 15, 2011

No Me Compares Con Nadie (Don't compare me to anyone) is the eighth album by Colombian singer-songwriter Silvestre Dangond and the seventh and the last with the accordionist, Juancho De la Espriella, released by Sony Music on August 31, 2011. In November 25 at the same year, the album received Diamond certification in Colombia for the strong sales.

== Track listing ==
| No. | Title | Length |
|---|---|---|
| 1. | "No Me Compares Con Nadie" | 4:26 |
| 2. | "La Cosita" | 3:54 |
| 3. | "Mi Amor Eres Tú" | 4:46 |
| 4. | "La Grabadora" | 4:39 |
| 5. | "El Fuerte" | 4:06 |
| 6. | "La Gringa" | 4:31 |
| 7. | "Un Amor Genial" | 4:35 |
| 8. | "El Gavilán" | 5:01 |
| 9. | "El Dilema" | 4:21 |
| 10. | "Por Dios Que Si" | 4:42 |
| 11. | "Estúpido (Groseria)" | 4:31 |
| 12. | "Mi Defensor" | 4:49 |

Bonus Track
| No. | Title | Length |
|---|---|---|
| 1. | "Esa Mujer ("That Woman")" | 3:09 |

== Charts and sales ==
=== Weekly charts ===
| Chart (2011) | Peak position |
|---|---|
| Colombian Albums | 1 |

=== Sales and certifications ===
| Region | Certification | Certified units/sales |
|---|---|---|
| Colombia (ASINCOL) | Diamond | 200,000 |
