= La 9a Batalla =

Studio album by Silvestre Dangond and Rolando Ochoa
- Released: June 13, 2013
- Genre: Vallenato
- Label: Sony Music Colombia

Silvestre Dangond albums chronology
| No Me Compares Con Nadie (2011) | La 9a Batalla (2013) | Sigo Invicto (2014) |

Singles from La 9a Batalla
- 1. "El Hit" Released: December 2012; 2. "La Difunta" Released: April 22, 2013

La 9a Batalla (English:The Ninth Battle) is the ninth album by Colombian singer Silvestre Dangond and the first with the accordionist Rolando Ochoa, released by Sony Music on June 13, 2013.

== Track listing ==
| No. | Title | Writer(s) | Length |
|---|---|---|---|
| 1. | "La Difunta" | Romualdo Brito | 4:33 |
| 2. | "Los Tengo de Payasos" | Rolando Ochoa | 3:29 |
| 3. | "Un Amor Verdadero" | Wilfran Castillo | 4:35 |
| 4. | "Ni Punto E' Comparación" | Rolando Ochoa | 4:53 |
| 5. | "Culpa de los Dos" | Alberto "Tico" Mercado; Pedro "Pedrinchi" Ávila | 4:19 |
| 6. | "La Ciquitrilla" | Rolando Ochoa | 4:00 |
| 7. | "Loco Paranoico" | Luis Egurroia | 3:34 |
| 8. | "La Cosa Sabrosa" | Lorenzo Morales | 4:25 |
| 9. | "En Este Sitio (En el Motel)" | Rafael Manjarrés | 4:32 |
| 10. | "La Traga Loca" | Omar Geles | 3:52 |
| 11. | "Lo Ajeno Se Respeta" | Eduardo "Cachurra" Fonseca | 4:33 |
| 12. | "Mi Mundo E' Cartón" | Fabián Corrales | 4:33 |
| 13. | "La Varita de San José" | Juancho Polo Valencia | 4:06 |
| 14. | "El Hit" | Calixto Ochoa | 4:39 |
| Total length: | | | 38:56 |

== Charts ==
| Chart (2013) | Peak position |
|---|---|
| Colombian Albums | 1 |
| US Latin Albums | 56 |
| US Tropical Albums | 8 |
| Venezuela Albums | 165 |

== Certifications ==
| Region | Certification | Certified units/sales |
|---|---|---|
| Venezuela | Platinum | 17,600 |
