= Wendy Corzo =

Colombian accordionist

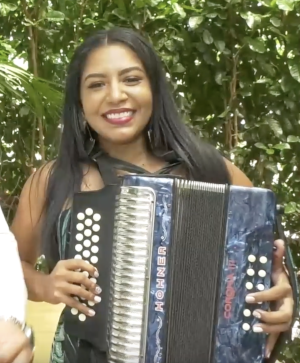
- Corzo in 2022

Background information
- Born: Wendy Paola Corzo Carmona; 1996 or 1997 (age 29–30); La Mina, Cesar, Colombia
- Genre: Vallenato

Wendy Paola Corzo Carmona (Note: In this Spanish name, the first or paternal surname is Corzo and the second or maternal family name is Carmona.) (born 1996 or 1997) is a Colombian vallenato accordionist. She won the professional accordionist competition of the Encuentro Vallenato Femenino in 2017, and was vallenato queen of the Vallenato Legend Festival in 2023.

== Biography ==
=== Early life ===
Wendy Paola Corzo Carmona was born in 1996 or 1997 and grew up in the village of La Mina, in the Colombian department of Cesar. She is Kankuamo, and her family are originally from Atanquez.

=== Music career ===
Corzo was given her first accordion at the age of 11 by her parents, and was taught to play by Iván González and Chema Ramos. She then joined Andrés "El Turco" Gil's group Los Niños Cantores y Acordeoneros del Vallenato, with whom she toured Europe.

In 2016 Corzo competed in the accordionist competition of the inaugural Encuentro Vallenato Femenino (Evafe), coming second behind Leidy Salgado. She also performed in the group contest with singer Evelyn Gómez, which they won. Corzo performed with Gómez at the Orchestra Festival of the Barranquilla Carnival in 2017, where they won a Congo de Oro in the vallenato category, with Corzo also winning individually in the best instrumentalist category. She won the Evafe professional accordionist competition in 2017, and in 2025 she was given the title of "sovereign" of the festival (Spanish: soberana del festival).

The Vallenato Legend Festival separated its accordionist competition by gender for the first time in 2019, and Corzo competed, but lost to Loraine Lara. She competed again in 2020 and 2022, and in 2023 she won and was awarded the title of vallenato queen. She performed again at the festival in 2024.

Corzo is a member of Las Musas del Vallenato, the all-female vallenato group founded by Patricia Teherán and Graciela Ceballos, and led by Danny Ceballos. She regularly accompanies Arhuaco singer Kandy Maku on the accordion, and they have toured in Latin America, the United States, Europe, and Japan.
