= Dryophylax dixoni =

Conservation status
- Least Concern (IUCN 3.1)

Scientific classification
- Kingdom: Animalia
- Phylum: Chordata
- Class: Reptilia
- Order: Squamata
- Suborder: Serpentes
- Family: Colubridae
- Genus: Dryophylax
- Species: D. dixoni

Binomial name
- Dryophylax dixoni Bailey & Thomas, 2007

Species of reptile

Dryophylax dixoni is a species of snake in the family Colubridae. The species is endemic to Venezuela and Colombia.

== Etymology ==
D. dixoni is named after American heptologist, James R. Dixon. It is also called Thamnodynastes dixoni.

== Description ==
This species is characterized as a snake with a typical pattern with smooth, weakly keeled scales arranged in 19-19-15 configuration. It has a divided cloacal plate and chin stripes. Males have 120-160 ventrical scales, while females have 141–150. There are 12-15 maxillary teeth present with 2 enlarged teeth. Most individuals have 12-15+2G teeth organization. Its hemipenis is very slender and spineless.

== Habitat ==
D. dixoni is found in Venezuela (Apure) and Southeastern Colombia. Its type locality is Hato La Guanota, 4 km (2.5 mi) west of San Fernando in Apure state.

== Life cycle ==
It features an ovoviviparous reproductive cycle.
