= Sigo Invicto =

Studio album by Silvestre Dangond
- Released: November 26, 2014
- Genre: Vallenato
- Label: Sony Music Colombia

Silvestre Dangond chronology
La 9a Batalla (2010)	Sigo Invicto (2014)

Singles from Sigo Invicto
- 1. "El Glu Glu" Released: November 7, 2014

Sigo Invicto ("Still Undefeated") is the tenth studio album by Colombian singer Silvestre Dangond and the first as soloist, released on November 26, 2014, by Sony Music Colombia.

== Track listing ==
Sigo Invicto — Standard edition
No.	Title	Writer(s)	Length
1.	"Me Sigues Gustando"	Silvestre Dangond	4:10
2.	"El Glu Glu"	Luis Egurrola	4:17
3.	"El Confite"	Carlos Amaris	3:28
4.	"Cómo lo Hizo"	Alberto "Tico" Mercado; Pedro "Pedrinchi" Ávila	4:04
5.	"Novia Ingrata"	Julio de la Ossa	4:01
6.	"Niégame Tres Veces"	Aurelio "Yeyo" Nuñez	4:29
7.	"El Leñazo" (featuring Álvaro López)	Alejo Durán	3:47
8.	"Ay Amor"	Dangond	3:40
9.	"El Borracho"	Juan Carlos Ovalle	4:51
10.	"Por Un Mensajito"	Hernán Urbina Joiro	4:44
11.	"La Loca"	Rolando Ochoa	4:09
12.	"El Mismo de Siempre"	Alberto Rada	4:22
13.	"El Tiempo" (featuring Álvaro López)	Sergio Moya Molina	4:43

Sigo Invicto — US iTunes Store bonus track
No.	Title	Writer(s)	Length
14.	"Va Con Su Marido" (featuring Martina La Peligrosa)	Juancho Polo Valencia	3:33

== Charts ==
Chart (2013)	Peak position
US Tropical Albums (Billboard)	9
