= Silvestre Dangond =

Colombian singer (born 1980)

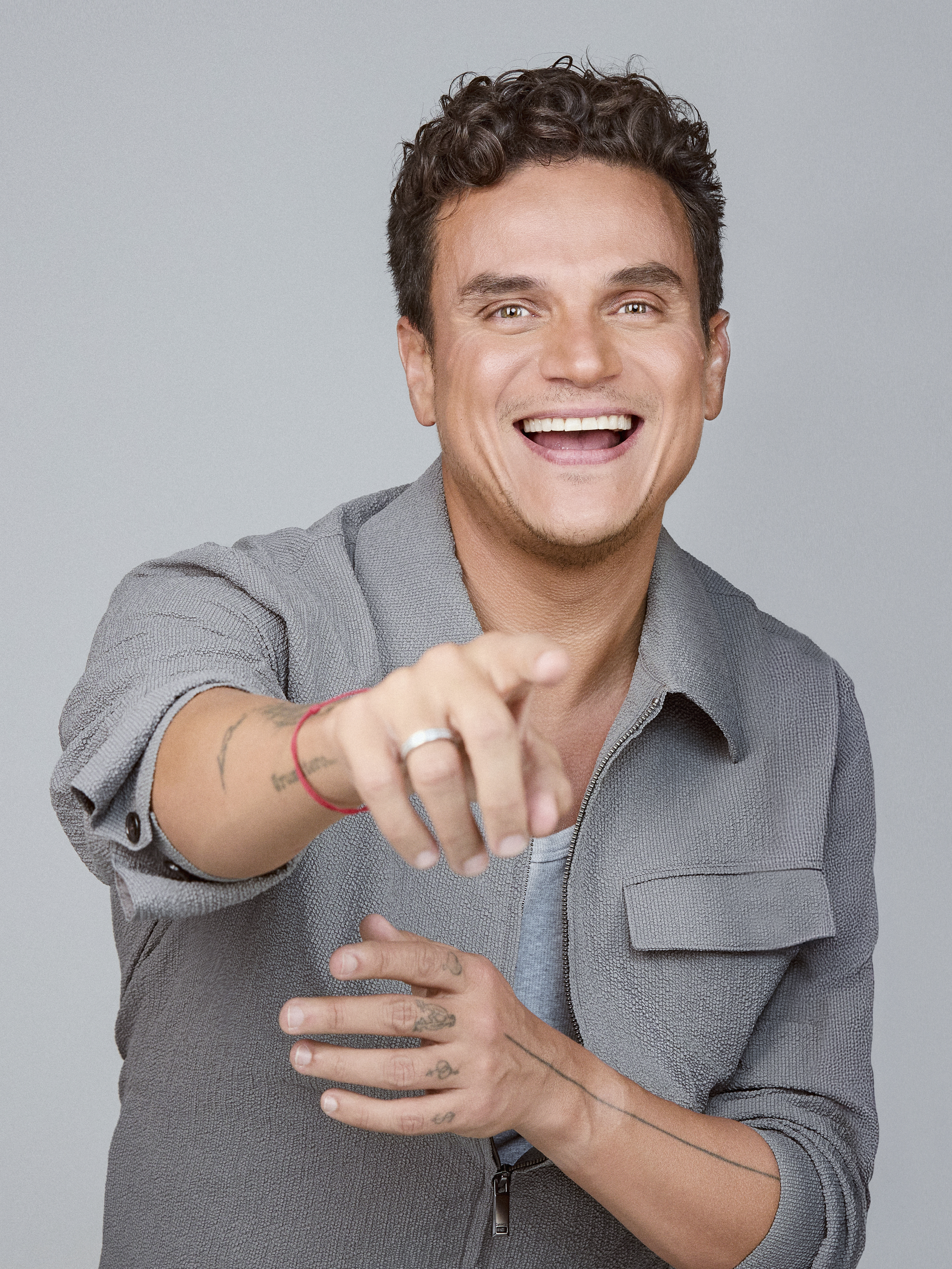
- Dangond in 2025

Background information
- Born: Silvestre Franciso Dangond Corrales; May 12, 1980 (age 46)
- Origin: Urumita, La Guajira, Colombia
- Genres: Vallenato, Latin
- Occupation: Singer
- Instrument: Guitar
- Years active: 2001–present
- Label: Sony Music
- Website: silvestredangond.com

Silvestre Francisco Dangond Corrales (born May 12, 1980, in Urumita) is a Colombian singer. He attributes his talents to his father, the singer William José "El Palomo" Dangond Baquero, who during the mid-1970s recorded 10 singles with Andrés "El Turco" Gil; and his mother, who comes from a musical family and passed down her charismatic nature to him, while also playing a major role in his formal and personal education.

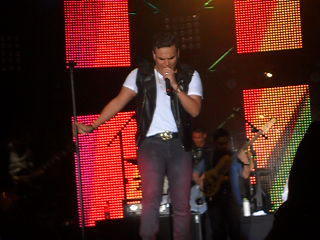
Silvestre in concert in Bogota in 2014.

== Early career ==
=== 2002: Debut album ===
After graduating from high school Dangond stayed dedicated to his music. He grouped with amateur accordion player Ramón López and after performing in some parties and gigs they recorded their first album in 2002, called Tanto para Tí, which included 12 songs: "Nada te conmueve" composed by Fabian Corrales, "Necesito verte" by Juan Manuel Perez, "No te escondas mas" by Felipe Pelaez, "Mi encantadora egoista" by Alberto Murgas, "Quien me mando" of his own authorship, "Un amor tan grande" by Freddy Carrillo, "Muñeca de porcelana" by Luis Alonso, "Que no me roben tu corazón" by Antonio Meriño, "Lloraras un amor" by Jaime Bayona, "La flor mas linda" by Armando Moscote, "El extorcionista" by Carlos Ramirez and "Tanto para ti" by Freddy Carrillo. During this time he met his friend and vallenato singer Kaleth Morales.

=== 2003–2013: Rise to national prominence ===
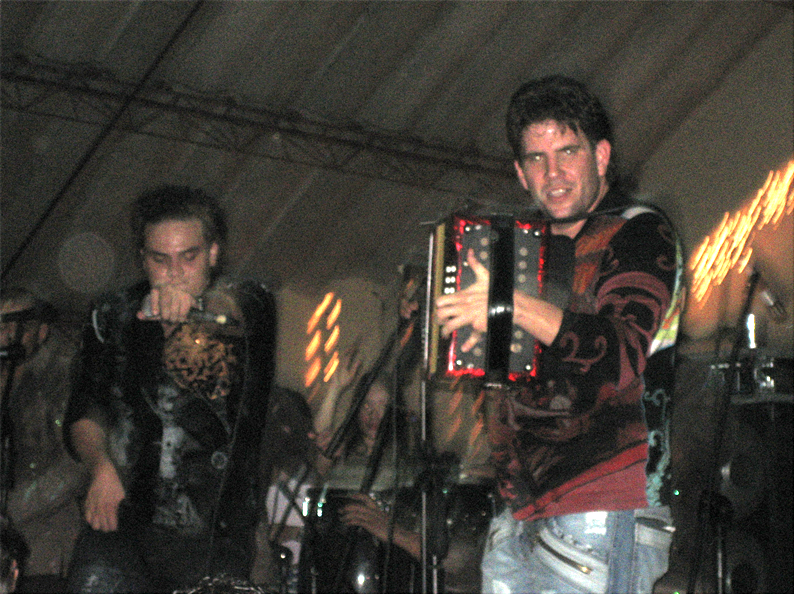
Dangond and Juancho De la Espriella performing live on stage.

By coincidence and through a mutual friend, manager and promoter Carlos Blum, Dangond officially met accordionist Juancho De la Espriella during a serenata (De la Espriella was grouped with singer Peter Manjarrez). Both of them knew who the other was but had never crossed paths. Since that day they became good friends. Blum convinced them to become a musical duo and arranged their first gig together at the Alfonso López Michelsen Building in a celebration of the Cesar Department foundation.

Lo mejor para los dos (The best for the two of us – Album) Their musical union created great buzz within the vallenato critics and fans, and shortly they recorded their first album together, Lo mejor para los dos (2003), containing 13 tracks: "La pinta chevere" of Dangond's authorship, "Nuestra vida" by Jose Hernandez, "Detalles y recuerdos" by Enrique Carrascal, "Mi amor por ella" by Omar Geles, "Ni en pintura" by Dagoberto Osorio, "El ring ring" by Luis Alonso, "Sabroso" by Hernando Marin, "Dejame quererte" by Alejandro Sarmiento, "No se, me equivoque" by Rafael Manjarrez, "La razon de mi vivir" by Ivan Calderon, "El chinchorrito" by Alejo Duran, "Me vuelve loquito" by Josue Rodriguez and "Lo mejor para los dos" by Kaleth Morales. Dangond and De la Espriella performed in more than 250 shows throughout 2003, most of them in December with 28 presentations.

Mas unidos que nunca (More united than ever – Album)

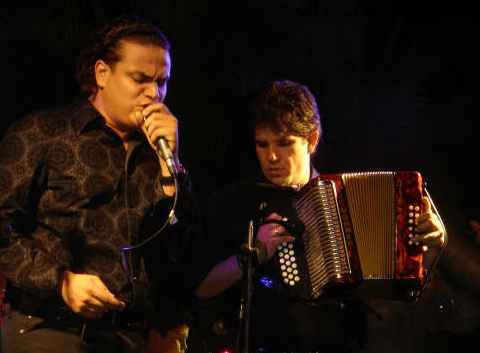
Silvestre Dangond and Juancho De la Espriella performing.

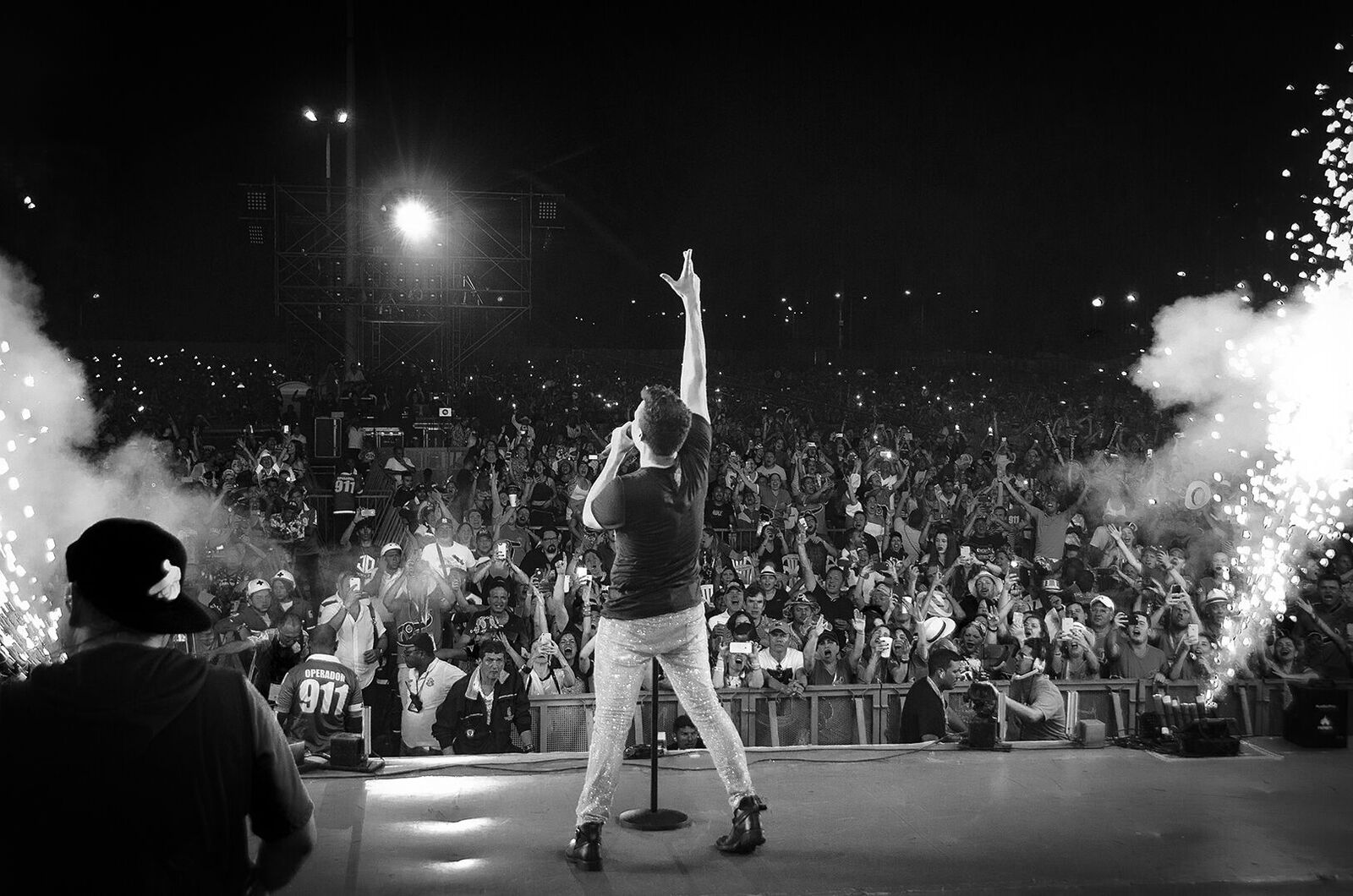
Silvestre Dangond – Live

Their following album was Mas unidos que nunca, released on June 13, 2004, containing 14 songs which included one unplugged bonus track: "Cautico mi canto" of Dangond's authorship, "El vaiven" by Hernando Bustos, "A blanco y negro" by Omar Geles, "La Colegiala" of Dangond's authorship, "Yo no me como ese cuento" by Dagoberto Osorio, "Acepto el reto" by Luis Egurrola, "Pa Barranquilla" of Dangond's authorship, "Me la juego toda" by Kaleth Morales, "Baila Vallenato" by Leo Duran, "La Mentira" by Wilfran Castillo, "Cuando llego en temple" by Armando Romero, "Celos y que" by Luis Alonso, "La mujer de mis sueños" by an unknown author and "La colegiala" unplugged version. With this album Dangond and De la Espriella consolidated as one of the most successful vallenato groups in this genre thanks to the acceptance of their hit song "La colegiala".

Ponte a la moda (Put up your style – Album) In 2005 Dangond and De la Espriella released their third album together, titled Ponte a la moda, which also became a great success in Colombia and outside Colombia, especially within the Latin American community in the United States. The album included the songs "Ahi viene ahi va" of Dangond's authorship, "Pa una mujer bonita" by Omar Geles, "Dile" by Alberto Mercado, "El tao tao" by Lucho Perez, "Mi seguidora y yo" by Kaleth Morales, "Esa mirada" by Enrique Araujo, "La pareja del momento" by Jeiner Lopez, "La misteriosa" by Isaac Calvo, "Ponte a la moda" by Luis Alonso, "Silvetre en Carnaval" by various artists, "Una vez mas" by Luis Egurrola, "El enredo" by Manuel Julian, "Por ser machista" of Dangond's authorship and "La indiferencia (live unplugged)" by Luis Alonso.

== Personal life ==
Dangond is the son of amateur singer William José Dangond Baquero (known as "El Palomo") and Dellys Corrales Rojas and has one brother, Carlos Ivan. He is married to childhood sweetheart Pieri Avendaño and they have three children, Luis Jose, Silvestre Jose and Jose Silvestre.

== Discography ==
With Román López

- Tanto para Tí (2002)

With Juancho De la Espriella

- Lo Mejor Para Los Dos (2003)
- Más Unidos Que Nunca (2004)
- Ponte a la Moda (2005)
- La Fama (2006)
- El Original (2008)
- El Cantinero (2010)
- No Me Compares Con Nadie (2011)
- Más Unidos Que Nunca: Beta-16 (2020)
- El Último Baile (2025)

With Rolando Ochoa

- La 9a Batalla (2013)
- Esto es vida (2018) (shared with Jorge Lucas Dangond, Junior Larios and Franco Arguelles)

With Álvaro López

- Sigo Invicto (2014) (shared with Jorge Lucas Dangond)

With Jorge Lucas Dangond

- Sigo Invicto (2014) (shared with Álvaro López)
- Gente Valiente (2017)
- Esto es vida (2018) (shared with Rolando Ochoa, Junior Larios and Franco Arguelles)
- Las Locuras Mías (2020)

With Rubén Lanao Jr.

- Intruso (2022)
- Ta' Malo (2023)

== Awards and nominations ==
=== Latin Grammy Awards ===
A Latin Grammy Award is an accolade by the Latin Academy of Recording Arts & Sciences to recognize outstanding achievement in the music industry.

Year	Nominee / work	Award	Result
2009	El Original: La Revolución	Best Cumbia/Vallenato Album	Nominated
2011	Cantinero	Best Cumbia/Vallenato Album	Nominated
2012	No Me Compares Con Nadie	Best Cumbia/Vallenato Album	Nominated
2013	La 9a Batalla	Best Cumbia/Vallenato Album	Nominated
2015	Sigo Invicto	Best Cumbia/Vallenato Album	Nominated
2017	Gente Valiente	Best Cumbia/Vallenato Album	Nominated
2018	Esto Es Vida	Best Cumbia/Vallenato Album	Won
2018	"Cásate Conmigo (With Nicky Jam)"	Best Tropical Song	Nominated
2023	Ta Malo	Best Cumbia/Vallenato Album	Won

=== Grammy Awards ===
A Grammy Award is an award presented by the Recording Academy to recognize achievements in the music industry.

Year	Nominee / work	Award	Result
2018	Gente Valiente	Best Tropical Latin Album	Nominated

=== Premios Nuestra Tierra ===
A Premio Nuestra Tierra is an accolade that recognizes outstanding achievement in the Colombian music industry.

Year	Nominee / work	Award	Result
2014	Himself	Artist of the Year	Nominated
2014	La 9a Batalla	Album of the Year	Nominated
2014	"Lo Ajeno Se Respeta"	Best Vallenato Performance of the Year	Nominated
2014	"La Difunta"	Best Vallenato Performance of the Year	Nominated
2014	Himself	Best Vallenato Solo Artist or Group	Nominated
2014	Himself	Best Mainstream Artist	Nominated
2014	"Lo Ajeno Se Respeta"	Best Mainstream Song	Nominated
2014	"Silvestristas"	Best Fan Club	Nominated
