= Encuentro Vallenato Femenino =

Music festival in Valledupar, Colombia

- Nickname: Evafe, EVAFE
- Status: Active
- Genre: Music Festival
- Frequency: Annual
- Locations: Valledupar, Colombia
- Years active: 2016–present
- Organiser: Decuplum Foundation

The Encuentro Vallenato Femenino (transl. Women's Vallenato Encounter), also known as Evafe or EVAFE, is a vallenato music festival that has been held annually in the Colombian city of Valledupar since 2016. Evafe hosts several competitions for female accordionists, as well as for singers and songwriters.

== History ==
Evafe is organised by the Decuplum Foundation (Spanish: Fundación Decuplum), directed by Sandra Arregocés. The competitions are open to women who perform vallenato, a genre of music from the Colombian Caribbean that has traditionally been male-dominated. Authors of an academic article on women who have won competitions at the Vallenato Legend Festival wrote that Evafe was possibly created "in response to the absence of female winners".

The first edition of Evafe took place in November 2016 at the Plaza Alfonso López Pumarejo in Valledupar, and was dedicated to Rita Fernández Padilla; competitions were held in five categories. Since then, Evafe has taken place annually. Several spin-off Evafe events have been held outside of Colombia, in countries including Mexico, Panama, and the Dominican Republic.

== Competitions ==
Evafe hosts competitions in several categories, whose winners are given the title of "queen" (Spanish: reina). Five awards are given to accordionists:

- Professional accordionist (Spanish: reina acordeonera profesional)
- Child accordionist (Spanish: reina acordeonera infantil)
- Caribbean (Spanish: reina caribeña), awarded since 2020, whose competition requires a performance of porro and cumbia.
- Outstanding apprentice (Spanish: aprendiz destacada), awarded since 2019.
- International, awarded since 2025 to an accordionist from a country other than Colombia.

The other competition categories of Evafe are Singer (Spanish: cantante), Songwriter (Spanish: compositora), and Best group (Spanish: mejor agrupación), which was awarded from 2016 to 2018.

In 2025, in addition to the usual competitions, a competition between past winners of the professional accordionist category was held, and the winner Wendy Corzo was given the title "sovereign of the professional accordion" (Spanish: soberana del acordeón profesional).

=== Winners of the competitions that are open to adults ===
No.	Year	Professional accordionist	Caribbean	Best Group	Singer	Songwriter and Song	International	Refs.
1	2016	Leidy Salgado	—N/a	Evelyn Gómez, Wendy Corzo	Jadith Muegues	Diana Marcela González "Viejo Amor del Valle"	—N/a	
2	2017	Wendy Corzo	—N/a	La Milagrosa (Mila Martínez, Leidy Salgado)	Tatiana Díaz	Sheila Tarazona "Contestación a Escalona"	—N/a	
3	2018	Nataly Patiño	—N/a	Revolución Femenina	María Alejandra Navarro	Andrea Barrios "A una Juglaresa"	—N/a	
4	2019	Loraine Lara	—N/a	—N/a	Laura Cardona	Elsy Serpa "Sueño de Mujer"	—N/a	
5	2020	Yennifer Quintero	Leidy Salgado	—N/a	Isabella Vergara	Juana Contreras "Acordeón Loco"	—N/a	
6	2021	Isabel Sofía Picón	Carlina Julio	—N/a	Sara Marcela Acosta	Elvia Diana Rincón "Me Cansé de Fingir"	—N/a	
7	2022	Maciel Gómez de la Ossa	Loraine Lara	—N/a	Nina María Murgas Zuleta	Sandra Rivera "Mi Niñita"	—N/a	
8	2023	Anny Gulfo	Nataly Patiño	—N/a	Nayeli Rodríguez	Ovetta Jiménez "Rebelde"	—N/a	
9	2024	Alma Luz Araújo Castro	María Victoria Castilla	—N/a	María Paula Abdala	Yina Martínez "Mujeres y Vallenato"	—N/a	
10	2025	María del Rosario Ortiz	Yorledys Meza	—N/a	Sara Pacheco	Yolanda Ariño	María de Jesús Suastes; Mexico	
11	2026	Jeimy Arrieta	Sara Mora	—N/a	Leidy Daza	Yeraldine Hernández	Jessica Moreno; Mexico	
"—" denotes years in which no award was given.
