= Dryophylax gambotensis =

Conservation status
- Least Concern (IUCN 3.1)

Scientific classification
- Kingdom: Animalia
- Phylum: Chordata
- Class: Reptilia
- Order: Squamata
- Suborder: Serpentes
- Family: Colubridae
- Genus: Dryophylax
- Species: D. gambotensis

Binomial name
- Dryophylax gambotensis Perez-Santos & Moreno, 1989

Species of snake

Dryophylax gambotensis is a species of snake in the family Colubridae. The species is endemic to Colombia.

== Etymology ==
The species is named after its type locality Gambote, Bolivar, Colombia.

It is also called Thermodynastes gambotensis

== Description ==
D. gambotensis contains 19 dorsal rows of smooth, weakly keeled scales and a single scale pit. It features a stout, spinous hemipenis. The maxillary teeth configuration is 12-14+2G, with 13+2G being the most common. Its chin is heavily pigmented, and larger scales may show contrasting pale centres. There is a presence of 7 supralabials.

== Habitat and Behavior ==
This species is native to Gambote, in Bolivar region in Colombia.

== Life cycle ==
It has a viviparous mode of reproduction.
