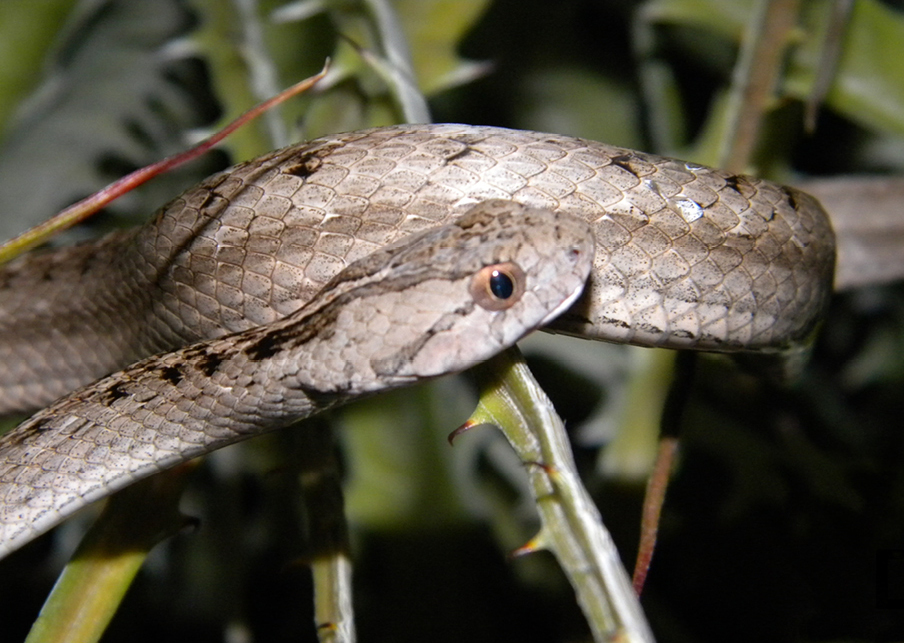

Conservation status
- Least Concern (IUCN 3.1)

Scientific classification
- Kingdom: Animalia
- Phylum: Chordata
- Class: Reptilia
- Order: Squamata
- Suborder: Serpentes
- Family: Colubridae
- Genus: Dryophylax
- Species: D. almae

Binomial name
- Dryophylax almae Franco & Ferreira, 2003

= Dryophylax almae =

Species of snake

Dryophylax almae is a species of snake in the family Colubridae. The species is endemic to Brazil.

== Etymology ==
The specific name, almae, is in honor of Brazilian herpetologist Sylvia Alma Renata Lemos Romano-Hoge.

Another name for the species is Thamnodynastes almae.

Common name include Jararaca, Jararaca-Falsa, Jararaquinha (Portuguese).

== Geographic range ==
D. almae is found in the Brazilian states of Alagoas, Amazonas, Bahia, Ceará, Paraíba, Pernambuco, Piauí, and Rio Grande do Norte.

== Habitat ==
The preferred natural habitat of D. almae is shrubland.

== Description ==
Pale in coloration for its genus, D almae has keeled dorsal scales, which are arranged in 19 rows at midbody and in 15 rows posteriorly.

== Reproduction ==
D. almae is viviparous.
