= Dryophylax duida =

Conservation status
- Least Concern (IUCN 3.1)

Scientific classification
- Kingdom: Animalia
- Phylum: Chordata
- Class: Reptilia
- Order: Squamata
- Suborder: Serpentes
- Family: Colubridae
- Genus: Dryophylax
- Species: D. duida

Binomial name
- Dryophylax duida Myers & Donnelly, 1996

Species of reptile

Dryophylax duida is a species of snake in the family Colubridae. The species is endemic to Venezuela.

== Etymology ==
It is synonymous with Thamnodynastes duida

== Habitat and behavior ==
It is found in the summit of Cerro Duida region at the southern end, in the valleys between peaks 7 and 16, approximately 2015 metres above ground.

== Life cycle ==
Mode of reproduction of D. duida is viviparous.
