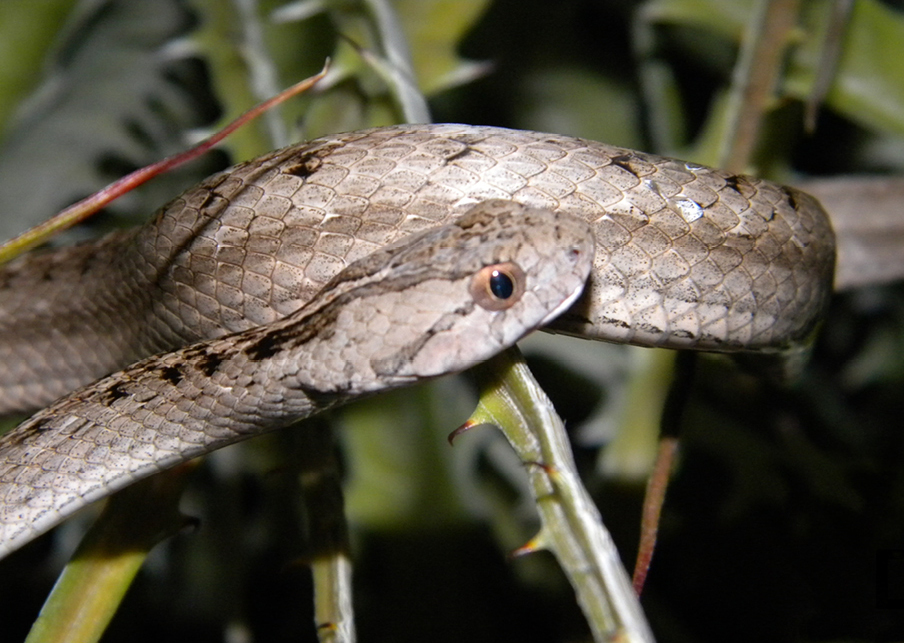
- Dryophylax almae

Scientific classification
- Kingdom: Animalia
- Phylum: Chordata
- Class: Reptilia
- Order: Squamata
- Suborder: Serpentes
- Family: Colubridae
- Subfamily: Dipsadinae
- Genus: Dryophylax; Wagler, 1830

= Dryophylax =

Genus of snakes

Dryophylax is a genus of Colubrid snakes (subfamily Dipsadinae) native to South America. These snakes are characterized by their slender body, arboreal habits and distinct coloration.

== Geographic range ==
All species in the genus Dryophylax are endemic to South America, mainly Brazil and Venezuela, and sometimes Colombia

== Taxonomy ==
Full classification
Domain	Eukaryota
Kingdom	Animalia
Phylum	Chordata
Class	Reptilia
Order	Squamata
Suborder	Serpentes
Infraorder	Alethinophidia
Superfamily	Colubroidea
Family	Colubridae
Subfamily	Dipsadinae
Clade	Caenophidia
Genus	Dryophylax

== Species ==
The following 15 species are recognized as being valid.

- Dryophylax almae Franco & Ferreira, 2003
- Dryophylax ceibae Bailey & Thomas, 2007
- Dryophylax chaquensis Bergna & Álvarez, 1993
- Dryophylax chimanta Roze, 1958 -Roze's coastal house snake
- Dryophylax corocoroensis Gorzula & Ayarzagüena, 1996
- Dryophylax dixoni Bailey & Thomas, 2007
- Dryophylax duida Myers & Donnelly, 1996
- Dryophylax gambotensis Pérez-Santos & Moreno, 1989
- Dryophylax hypoconia (Cope, 1860)
- Dryophylax marahuaquensis Gorzula & Ayarzagüena, 1996
- Dryophylax nattereri (Mikan, 1820) - Amazon coastal house snake, northern coastal house snake
- Dryophylax paraguanae Bailey & Thomas, 2007
- Dryophylax phoenix Franco, Trevine, Montingelli, & Zaher, 2017
- Dryophylax ramonriveroi Manzanilla & Sánchez, 2005 - Guianan coastal house snake
- Dryophylax yavi Myers & Donnelly, 1996

Nota bene: A binomial authority in parentheses indicates that the species was originally described in a genus other than Dryophylax.
