= Loraine Lara =

Colombian accordionist, songwriter, and singer

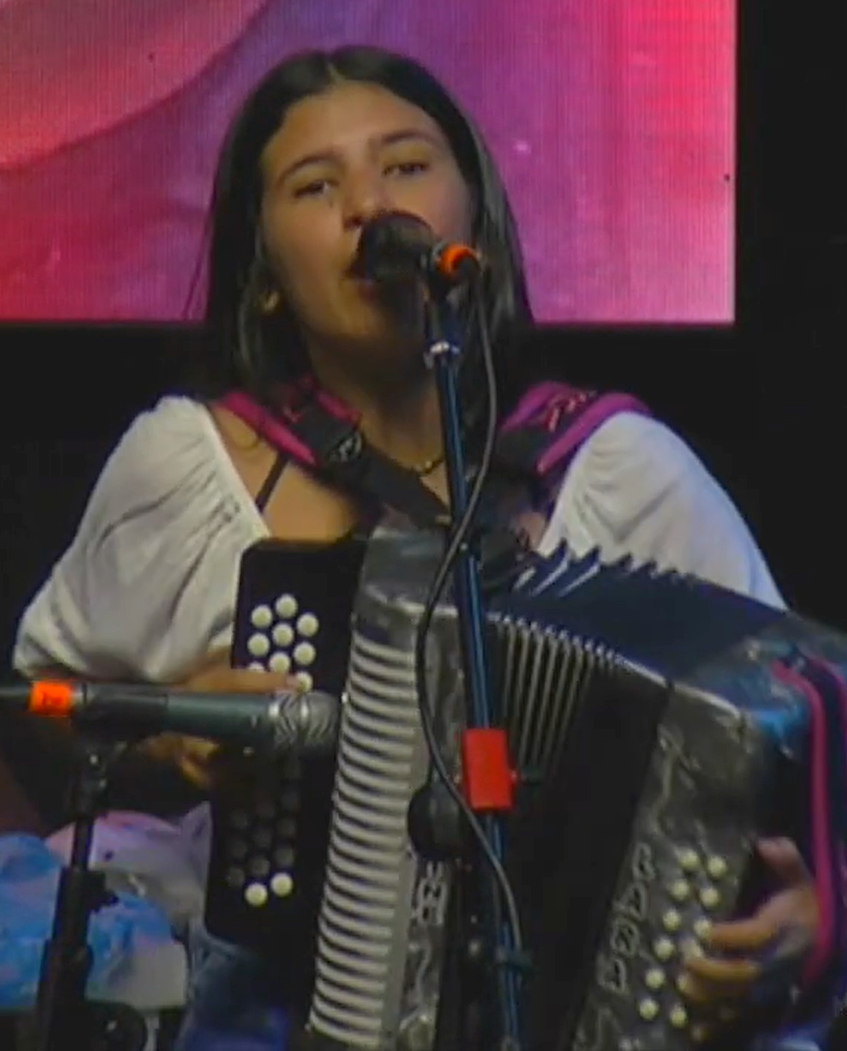
- Performing in 2018

Background information
- Born: Loraine Lara Mercado; November 2000 (age 25); Sabanalarga, Colombia
- Genres: Vallenato

Loraine Lara Mercado (Note: In this Spanish name, the first or paternal surname is Lara and the second or maternal family name is Mercado.) (born 2000) is a Colombian vallenato accordionist, songwriter, and singer. In 2019 she was crowned vallenato queen at both the Vallenato Legend Festival and the Encuentro Vallenato Femenino for winning their respective accordionist competitions.

== Biography ==
Loraine Lara Mercado was born in November 2000 in Sabanalarga, in the Colombian department of Atlántico. Her father Pedro Lara is an accordionist and accordion teacher, and her sister Sandra Camargo is a songwriter who sang backing vocals for Patricia Teherán and her Musas del Vallenato. Lara began learning accordion at the age of 12, and the first song she could play was "La Piña Madura".

At the age of 16 Lara won the amateur accordionist competition of the Cradle of Accordions Festival, and with her winnings she bought another accordion. In 2019, at the age of 18, she was crowned vallenato queen for winning the first acordeonera mayor competition of the Vallenato Legend Festival, accompanied by Fabio Maestre on caja and Andrea Guillén on guacharaca. Wendy Corzo came second, and Maribel Cortina came third. Lara performed two of her own compositions in the final: the paseo "La Espina en el Dedo" and the puya "No Le Temo a Nadie". In November 2019, Lara won the accordionist competition of the Encuentro Vallenato Femenino, which she had previously competed in three times.
