= Dryophylax phoenix =

Scientific classification
- Kingdom: Animalia
- Phylum: Chordata
- Class: Reptilia
- Order: Squamata
- Suborder: Serpentes
- Family: Colubridae
- Genus: Dryophylax
- Species: D. phoenix

Binomial name
- Dryophylax phoenix Franco, Trevine, Montingelli, & Zaher, 2017

Species of reptile

Dryophylax phoenix is a species of snake in the family Colubridae. The species is endemic to Brazil.

== Etymology ==
D. phoenix is named after the Greek mythological bird, the Phoenix (φοῖνιξ phoinix; Latin: phoenix, fenix), which dies in flames and rises from ashes. It is referenced due to the loss of the original holotype of this species, in a fire that destroyed 90% of its herpetological collection. Some specimens were rescued and the data from the lost specimens was preserved. Some common names include Cobra-Espada and Corre-Campo (Portuguese).

It is synonymous with

- Thamnodynastes phoenix
- Thamnodynastes sp.
- Thamnodynastes sp. 2

== Description ==
Dryophylax phoenix differs from other species in the same genus by the 19-19-15 dorsal rows of smooth scales configuration, a maximum SVL of 495 mm, and a maximum TL of 136 mm. It features 133-159 ventral scales and 40 to 66 subcaudals. The ventral side of its head is spotted with dark brown blotches, with infralabials and chin shields having a white center and a dark border. Two pairs of non-continuous longitudinal dark ventral stripes are present, with a conspicuous black spot on the apex of each ventral scale. The tail tip is paler than the body, almost white in juveniles, without blotches.

== Habitat and behavior ==
D. phoenix mainly inhabits the states of Alagoas, Bahia, Ceará, Paraíba, Pernambuco, Piauí, Rio Grande do Norte, Sergipe, Minas Gerais, Goiás, and Tocantins in Brazil. Its place of origin is Pernambuco, in the municipality of Petrolina on the UNIVASF Campus Ciências Agrárias, 389 metres above sea level.
