= Nataly Patiño =

Colombian accordionist

- Born: Nataly Yishell Patiño Amarís; 1999 or 2000 (age 25–26); Valledupar, Colombia
- Genres: Vallenato

Nataly Yishell Patiño Amarís (Note: In this Spanish name, the first or paternal surname is Patiño and the second or maternal family name is Amarís.) (born 1999 or 2000) is a Colombian vallenato accordionist. She won the accordionist competition of the Encuentro Vallenato Femenino in 2018, and was crowned vallenato queen for winning the acordeonera mayor competition of the Vallenato Legend Festival in 2021.

== Biography ==
=== Early life ===
Patiño was born in 1999 or 2000 in Valledupar, in the Colombian department of Cesar, to Karina Amarís and Wilmar Patiño. Her father is an accordionist, and began teaching her to play at the age of 7; the first song she learned was "La Piña Madura", written by Guillermo Buitrago. She was later taught by Jairo Suárez Reales.

=== Music career ===
In 2016 Patiño won the accordionist competition of the Festival Femenino del Vallenato, which was organised by the Cacique Tayrona Foundation. In November 2018 she won the accordionist competition of the Encuentro Vallenato Femenino (Evafe). She was the only woman to compete in the accordionist competition of the Festival Cuna de Acordeones in 2019. Also in 2019, Patiño competed in the inaugural acordeonera mayor competition of the Vallenato Legend Festival, whose winner is crowned reina vallenata (Spanish for "vallenato queen").

Patiño competed again in the acordeonera mayor competition of the Vallenato Legend Festival in 2020, and came second; during the competition, her mother died of breast cancer. Patiño had sold an accordion to pay for her mother's treatment, and sold another to pay her funeral expenses. In the competition she played two songs of her own composition, the puya "Comenzó el Festival" and the son "El Derecho de las Mujeres". In 2021, Patiño competed once more, and won. Sara Arango came second, and María Sara Vega came third.
