= Dryophylax chaquensis =

Conservation status
- Least Concern (IUCN 3.1)

Scientific classification
- Kingdom: Animalia
- Phylum: Chordata
- Class: Reptilia
- Order: Squamata
- Suborder: Serpentes
- Family: Colubridae
- Genus: Dryophylax
- Species: D. chaquensis

Binomial name
- Dryophylax chaquensis Bergna & Alvarez, 1993

Species of snake

Dryophylax chaquensis, commonly known as Jararaca-Falsa (Portuguese), is a species of snake in the family Colubridae. The species is endemic to Brazil.

== Etymology ==
It is named after the type locality in the Argentinian Chaco. Another name for it is Thermodynastes chaquensis.

== Habitat and Behavior ==
This species is partly aboreal. This species is found in Paraguay (Neembucu), Uruguay, Brazil, and Argentina (Santa Fe, Formosa, Chaco, Jujuy).

== Life cycle ==
D. chaquensis has a vivparous mode of reproduction.
