= Maribel Cortina =

Colombian accordionist

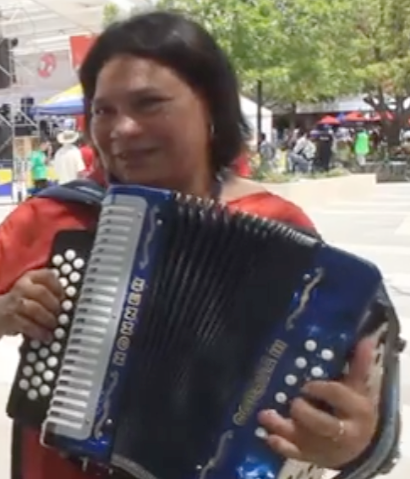
- In a 2019 interview

Background information
- Born: Maribel de Los Ángeles Cortina Fonseca; Ariguaní, Colombia
- Genres: vallenato
- Years active: 1980s–present

Maribel de Los Ángeles Cortina Fonseca is a Colombian accordionist. She was a member of Patricia Teherán's Diosas del Vallenato and played accordion on the hit "Tarde lo Conocí".

== Biography ==
Cortina was born in Ariguaní in Magdalena, Colombia, and grew up in Plato. Her father played and fixed accordions, and she would sometimes play the ones he was repairing. Cortina began to play accordion at parties at the age of 10, with musicians like Eliseo Reyes and Modesto Barrios. In 1980 Cortina's godfather took her to perform at a vallenato festival in Santa Marta. Her father first saw her play at a vallenato festival in Plato; he had entered her brother, but withdrew him when he saw Maribel perform.

In 1993 Cortina formed Las Diosas del Vallenato with Patricia Teherán. The group released an album Con Aroma De Mujer in 1994, and were planning a US tour when Teherán died in January 1995. Following Teherán's death, Cortina recorded the albums Por Siempre y Para Siempre and Contra Viento y Marea with Baudilia Gutiérrez and Rosalba Chico. Las Diosas split in 1997 and since then Cortina has played with singers including Julio Gutiérrez, Rocío Rojas, Luchi Ortega, and Miriam Negrette.

Cortina participated in the amateur accordionist competition of the Festival de la Leyenda Vallenata in 1985, 1986, and 1988, coming second each time. From 1989 she competed several times in the professional accordionist competition, and as of 2014 was the only woman to have done so. Cortina has publicly stated that she has not felt discriminated against at the festival because of her gender. In 2019 the festival split the accordion competition into separate men's and women's competitions, and Cortina lost in the final to Loraine Lara.
