= Gambote, Bolívar =

- Populated center
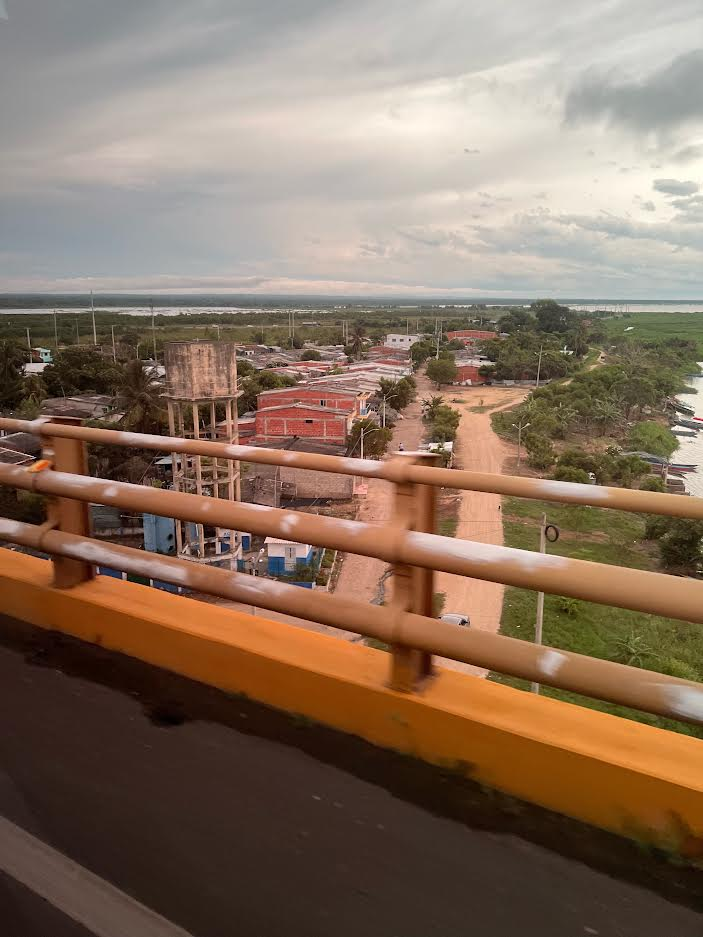
- View of Gambote

- Location in Colombia
- Coordinates: 10°09′35″N 75°18′06″W
- Country: Colombia
- Department: Bolívar Department
- Municipality: Arjona

Area
  - Total: 0.2037 km^{2} (0.0786 sq mi)

Population (2018)
  - Total: 1,531
  - Density: 7,515/km^{2} (19,460/sq mi)
- Time zone: UTC-5 (Colombia Standard Time)

Gambote is a populated center of Colombia in the northern part of the department of Bolívar, Colombia. It is part of the municipality of Arjona and has a population of 1,531 as of 2018. It is located approximately 39 km south of Cartagena. The town is situated on the banks of the Canal del Dique and is responsible for the administration of fresh water supply for the northern part of the department. The town is also known for the Gambote Bridge which cuts through the town.

== Geography ==
Gambote is located 10° 09’ 35” and 4° 33’ 50” north and 75° 18’ 06” west. It lies in the Atlantic Coastal zone and is situated on the Canal del Dique--which flows from the Magdalena River.

== Economy ==
The economy of Gambote is based on fruit and corn cultivation, and the administration of the Canal del Dique. Fishing is also a cornerstone of the economy of Gambote.

One of the major barriers to economic growth in the town has been the lack of suitable flood infrastructure, enabling destructive floods that have displaced hundreds of inhabitants. However, as of 2020, the Colombian government has declared that issues with preventative flood infrastructure projects in the town have been resolved.

== Demographics ==
Gambote has a total population density of 7,515 kilometres squared and a total population of 1,531. 51.5% of the population are males whereas 48.5% of the population are females. The majority of inhabitants are also young to middle-aged with 65.1% of the population falling into the 15-64 age range. Poverty and underdevelopment remain persistent problems in the town.
