= Dryophylax ramonriveroi =

Conservation status
- Least Concern (IUCN 3.1)

Scientific classification
- Kingdom: Animalia
- Phylum: Chordata
- Class: Reptilia
- Order: Squamata
- Suborder: Serpentes
- Family: Colubridae
- Genus: Dryophylax
- Species: D. ramonriveroi

Binomial name
- Dryophylax ramonriveroi Manzanilla & Sánchez, 2005

Species of reptile

Dryophylax ramonriveroi, also called the Guianan coastal house snake, is a species of snake in the family Colubridae. The species is found in Venezuela, Suriname, Guyana, and Brazil.

== Etymology ==
It is named after Ramon Rivero, who has maintained the reptile collection at the Rancho Grande Biological Station for over 20 years.

== Description ==
They have been recorded to feed exclusively on anurans. D. ramonriveroi exhibit nocturnal and semi-aboreal habits. Information about this species is scarce, due to its limited geographical range.

== Life cycle ==
This species is ovoviparous.
