= Dryophylax corocoroensis =

Conservation status
- Least Concern (IUCN 3.1)

Scientific classification
- Kingdom: Animalia
- Phylum: Chordata
- Class: Reptilia
- Order: Squamata
- Suborder: Serpentes
- Family: Colubridae
- Genus: Dryophylax
- Species: D. corocoroensis

Binomial name
- Dryophylax corocoroensis Gorzula & Ayarzagüena, 1996

Species of reptile

Dryophylax corocoroensis is a species of snake in the family Colubridae. The species is endemic to Venezuela

== Etymology ==
D. corocoroensis is named after its type locality, the summit of Tepuy Corcoro. It is synonymous with Thamnodynastes corocoroensis.

== Habitat ==
It inhabits the northwest Tepuis region, in Venezuela, at an elevation of 2150 meters in Bolivar State.

== Life cycle ==
This species has a viviparous mode of reproduction.
