= Thamnodynastes longicauda =

Conservation status
- Least Concern (IUCN 3.1)

Scientific classification
- Kingdom: Animalia
- Phylum: Chordata
- Class: Reptilia
- Order: Squamata
- Suborder: Serpentes
- Family: Colubridae
- Genus: Thamnodynastes
- Species: T. longicauda

Binomial name
- Thamnodynastes longicauda Franco, Ferreira, Marques & Sazima, 2003

Species of snake

Thamnodynastes longicauda is a species of snake in the family Colubridae. It is found in Brazil.
