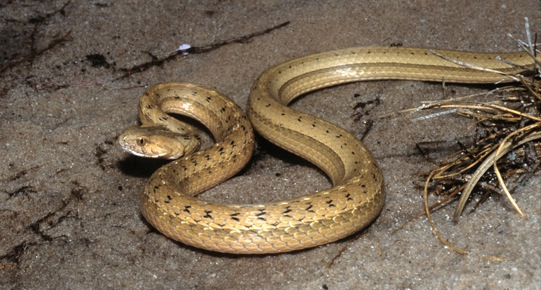
- In Lençóis Maranhenses National Park

Conservation status
- Least Concern (IUCN 3.1)

Scientific classification
- Kingdom: Animalia
- Phylum: Chordata
- Class: Reptilia
- Order: Squamata
- Suborder: Serpentes
- Family: Colubridae
- Genus: Dryophylax
- Species: D. hypoconia

Binomial name
- Dryophylax hypoconia (Cope, 1860)

Synonyms
- Dryophylas pallidus subsp. strigilis Thunberg, 1787; Dryophylax pallidus subsp. strigilis Serié, 1936; Tachymenis hypoconia Cope, 1860; Thamnodynastes nattereri Boulenger, 1896

= Dryophylax hypoconia =

Species of snake

Dryophylax hypoconia is a species of snake in the family Colubridae. The species is endemic to South America.

== Geographic range ==
D. hypoconia is found in Argentina, Brazil, Paraguay, and Uruguay. It is distributed around several regions in Suuth America. In Brazil, it can be found in Rio Grande do Sul, Goias, Bahia, and Rio de Janeiro. In Argentina, its range includes Formosa, Chaco, Corrientes, Misiones, Entre Rios, Santa Fe, Buenos Aires and Cordoba provinces.

The type locality of this species is Buenos Aires, Argentina.

== Life cycle ==
The species is viviparous. Clutch sizes typically range from 4-16 embryos, and there is no significant relationship between clutches size and female's body size. Oviposition occurs from January to April.
