= Dryophylax chimanta =

Conservation status
- Least Concern (IUCN 3.1)

Scientific classification
- Kingdom: Animalia
- Phylum: Chordata
- Class: Reptilia
- Order: Squamata
- Suborder: Serpentes
- Family: Colubridae
- Genus: Dryophylax
- Species: D. chimanta

Binomial name
- Dryophylax chimanta Roze, 1958

Species of reptile

Dryophylax chimanta (also known as Roze's coastal house snake) is a species of snake in the family Colubridae. The species is endemic to Venezuela and only known from the Chimantá tepui.

== Etymology ==
This species is named after its type locality which is Chimantá Tepui, Bolívar, Venezuela.

Also called Thermodynastes chimanta.

== Habitat and Behavior ==
D. chimanta is regarded as partly arboreal.

== Life cycle ==
Its reproductive cycle is viviparous.
