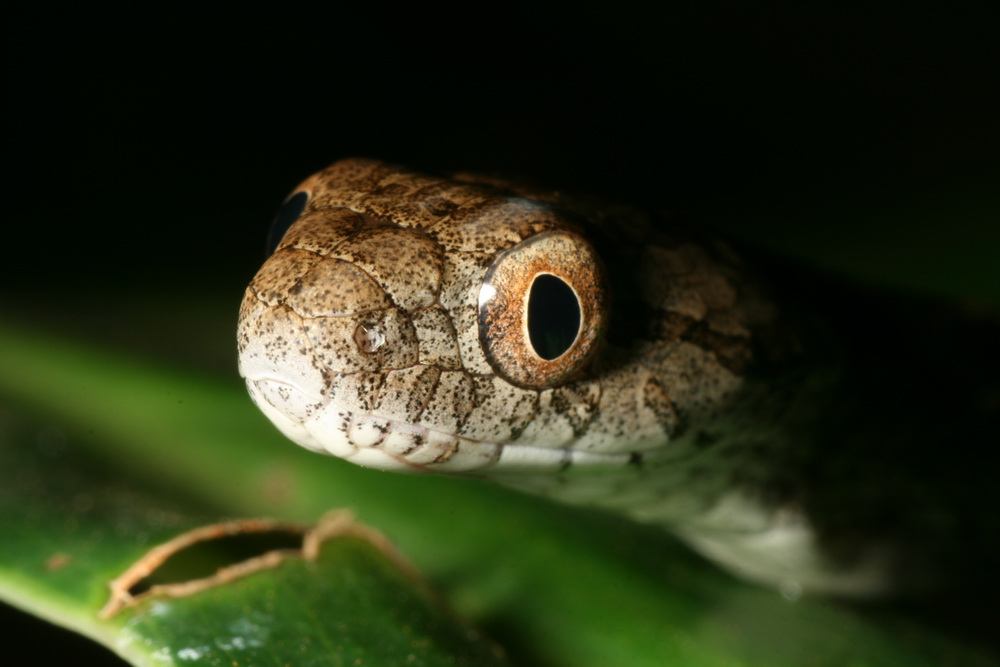
- Thamnodynastes pallidus

Scientific classification
- Kingdom: Animalia
- Phylum: Chordata
- Class: Reptilia
- Order: Squamata
- Suborder: Serpentes
- Family: Colubridae
- Subfamily: Dipsadinae
- Genus: Thamnodynastes; Wagler, 1830

= Thamnodynastes =

Genus of snakes

Thamnodynastes is a genus of snakes in the subfamily Dipsadinae of the family Colubridae. The genus contains four species.

== Geographic range ==
All species in the genus Thamnodynastes are endemic to South America.

== Species ==
The following four species are recognized as being valid.

- Thamnodynastes longicauda Franco, Ferreira, Marques & Sazima, 2003
- Thamnodynastes pallidus (Linnaeus, 1758) – Amazon coastal house snake
- Thamnodynastes sertanejo Bailey, R.A. Thomas & da Silva, 2005
- Thamnodynastes silvai Trevine, Caicedo-Portilla, Hoogmoed, R.A. Thomas, Franco, Montingelli, Osorno-Muñoz & Zaher, 2021

Nota bene: A binomial authority in parentheses indicates that the species was originally described in a genus other than Thamnodynastes.
