= Luis Egurrola =

Colombian songwriter

- Born: Luis Aniceto Egurrola Hinojosa; 19 July 1964; San Juan del Cesar, Colombia
- Died: 16 September 2024 (aged 60) Valledupar, Colombia
- Genres: Vallenato

Luis Aniceto Egurrola Hinojosa (Note: In this Spanish name, the first or paternal surname is Egurrola and the second or maternal family name is Hinojosa.) (1964–2024) was a Colombian vallenato songwriter. His songs were recorded by artists including Diomedes Díaz, Jorge Oñate, and Silvestre Dangond.

== Biography ==
Egurrola was born on 19 July 1964 in San Juan del Cesar, in the Colombian department of La Guajira. He had six siblings, including his twin sister María Teresa Egurrola who was Miss Colombia in 1988.

Egurrola wrote songs in the genre of vallenato romántico. Several well-known artists recorded his compositions, including Diomedes Díaz, Jorge Celedón, Jesús Manuel Estrada, Jorge Oñate, and Silvestre Dangond. His notable compositions include "Al Final del Sendero", "Ilusiones", "Sin Saber Que Me Esperas", and "Ven Conmigo". On two occasions, he was named "Songwriter of the Year" (Spanish: Compositor del Año) at the Festival Nacional de Compositores de Música Vallenata in San Juan del Cesar. His first win was with the song "Sin Decir Adiós", which was recorded by Los Betos. Egurrola was later president of the festival, and the 2025 edition was held in his honour.

Egurrola died on 16 September 2024 in hospital in Valledupar after suffering a pulmonary thromboembolism. On his death, El Espectador described him as "one of [Colombia's] best-known vallenato composers".
