= Dryophylax yavi =

Conservation status
- Least Concern (IUCN 3.1)

Scientific classification
- Kingdom: Animalia
- Phylum: Chordata
- Class: Reptilia
- Order: Squamata
- Suborder: Serpentes
- Family: Colubridae
- Genus: Dryophylax
- Species: D. yavi

Binomial name
- Dryophylax yavi Myers & Donnelly, 1996

Species of reptile

Dryophylax yavi is a species of snake in the family Colubridae. The species is endemic to Venezuela.

== Etymology ==
Named after its type locality, summit of Cerro Yaví. It is synonymous with Thermodynastes yavi.

== Habitat ==
Its origin place is the summit of Cerro Yavi in Amazonas, Venezuela. It is usually found at an elevation of 2150 metres.

== Life cycle ==
The mode of reproduction followed by D. yavi is viviparous.
