= Dryophylax marahuaquensis =

Conservation status
- Least Concern (IUCN 3.1)

Scientific classification
- Kingdom: Animalia
- Phylum: Chordata
- Class: Reptilia
- Order: Squamata
- Suborder: Serpentes
- Family: Colubridae
- Genus: Dryophylax
- Species: D. marahuaquensis

Binomial name
- Dryophylax marahuaquensis Gorzula & Ayarzagüena, 1996

Species of reptile

Dryophylax marahuaquensis is a species of snake in the family Colubridae. The species is endemic to Venezuela.

== Etymology ==
It is named after its type locality, Tepuy Marahuaca. The name is synonymous with Thermodynastes marahuaquensis.

== Habitat and behavior ==
D. marahuaquensis is found in Venezuela's Amazonas region. Its place of origin is Tepuy Marahuaca Norte, 2500 metres above ground level in Amazonas State.

== Life cycle ==
They follow a viviparous mode of reproduction.
