= Thamnodynastes sertanejo =

Conservation status
- Least Concern (IUCN 3.1)

Scientific classification
- Kingdom: Animalia
- Phylum: Chordata
- Class: Reptilia
- Order: Squamata
- Suborder: Serpentes
- Family: Colubridae
- Genus: Thamnodynastes
- Species: T. sertanejo

Binomial name
- Thamnodynastes sertanejo Bailey, Thomas, & Da Silva, 2005

Species of snake

Thamnodynastes sertanejo is a species of snake in the family, Colubridae. It is found in Brazil.
