= Thamnodynastes silvai =

Scientific classification
- Kingdom: Animalia
- Phylum: Chordata
- Class: Reptilia
- Order: Squamata
- Suborder: Serpentes
- Family: Colubridae
- Genus: Thamnodynastes
- Species: T. silvai

Binomial name
- Thamnodynastes silvai Trevine, Caicedo-Portilla, Hoogmoed, Thomas, Franco, Montingelli, Osorno-Munoz, & Zaher, 2021

Species of snake

Thamnodynastes silvai is a species of snake in the family, Colubridae. It is found in Peru.
