= Cecilia Meza Reales =

Colombian accordionist and singer

- Born: 1946; Valledupar, Colombia
- Died: 13 November 2012 (aged 66) Bogotá, Colombia
- Genre: Vallenato
- Instruments: Accordion, vocals

Cecilia Meza Reales (Note: In this Spanish name, the first or paternal surname is Meza and the second or maternal family name is Reales.) (1946–2012) was a Colombian vallenato accordionist and singer. She was one of the first women to play vallenato, and was renowned for her skill on the accordion and for her beauty.

== Biography ==
=== Early life ===
Cecilia Meza Reales was born in 1946 in Valledupar (then in the department of Magdalena, now the capital of Cesar) to Ciro Meza Monsalvo and Aura Reales. She had five siblings, including the accordionists Ciro and Álvaro Meza Reales, who were both vallenato king at the Vallenato Legend Festival. Her cousin Fredys Socarrás was later mayor of Valledupar.

=== Music career ===
Meza was taught to play accordion by Colacho Mendoza. El Tiempo wrote that "in the late 1960s, the best female performers of the diatonic accordion...were Cecilia [Meza Reales] and Fabri Meriño." At the time few women played vallenato music. Meza was admired for her accordion playing and for her beauty, and was the subject of songs by Rafael Gutiérrez Céspedes and Gustavo Gutiérrez Cabello. According to El Espectador, Fredy Molina "fell silently in love with her and never dared to tell her".

In the 1970s, Meza joined the all-female vallenato band Las Universitarias, led by Rita Fernández Padilla. She played accordion on Las Universitarias' album Alma Vallenata, and sang lead vocals on the track "Nostalgia Fonsequera". She also accompanied Fernández on accordion on her solo album La Reina del Vallenato, where she sang lead vocals on "La Capital" and "Tiempos Felices".

In 1970 Meza won the Festival de la Canción in Villavicencio, and she was later on the jury at other festivals in Colombia, including the 1974 Festival de Cantantes organised by the Colegio Nacional Loperena, where she worked as a librarian. Meza later moved to Bogotá, where she worked at the Instituto Colombiano de Seguros Sociales and gradually stopped making music. Julio Oñate Martínez wrote that "circumstances in her life led her to devote herself to other activities, depriving vallenato music of an undeniable talent."

=== Death ===
Meza died in Bogotá on 13 November 2012, at the age of 66.
