= Rita Fernández Padilla =

Colombian musician, singer, and songwriter

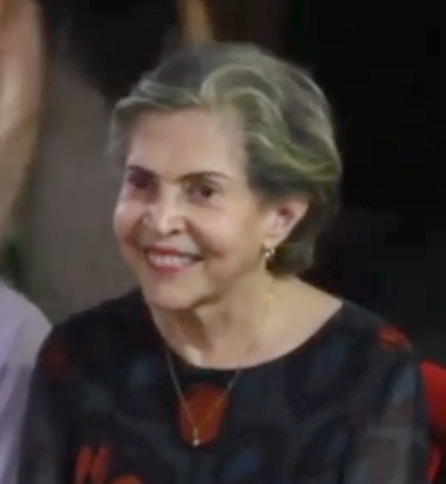

Background information
- Born: 21 June 1946 (age 80); Santa Marta, Colombia
- Genres: Vallenato

Rita Fernández Padilla (Note: In this Spanish name, the first or paternal surname is Fernández and the second or maternal family name is Padilla.) (born 1946) is a Colombian musician, singer, and songwriter. She led the vallenato conjunto Las Universitarias, and has written several well-known songs, including the official hymn of Valledupar.

== Biography ==
Fernández was born on 21 June 1946 in Santa Marta, in the Colombian department of Magdalena. She was taught to play piano by her mother, and was introduced to vallenato by school friends. She studied at the School of Fine Arts in Santa Marta.

Fernández's music career began in 1967. She directed, sang, and played accordion for the vallenato band Las Universitarias, who were "the first female conjunto dedicated to the genre", and performed (but did not compete) at the first Vallenato Legend Festival in 1968. The other members of Las Universitarias were Carmen Mejía, Lucy Serrano, Lourdes Cuello, Miriam Serrano, and Betty Nokman. They released their self-titled debut Las Universitarias in 1969, and then split because their boyfriends disapproved of the group.

Las Universitarias returned for a second and final album Alma Vallenata in 1975, credited to Rita Fernández con Las Universitarias, and with the addition of Cecilia Meza Reales on vocals and accordion. Fernández also released two solo albums, where she was joined on accordion by Meza.

Fernández was the first female president of SAYCO, the Colombian copyright collective.

== Musical style and notable compositions ==
Fernández has written over 80 songs in various styles, including vallenato, salsa, bolero, son cubano, and pasillo. She started composing as a teenager. Although vallenato is traditionally played on a button accordion, Fernández composes her vallenato songs on a piano accordion, a technique she learned from Gustavo Gutiérrez Cabello.

The official anthem of the city of Valledupar was written by Fernández, and the city council has named her an "Adoptive Daughter". Her song "Tierra Blanda" won a Colcultura competition. Other notable songs written by Fernández include the vallenatos "Las Dudas del Amor" and "Sombra Perdida", recorded by Binomio de Oro, and the salsa "El Son del Tren", recorded by Fruko y sus Tesos. Other artists that have recorded Fernández's compositions include Jorge Oñate, Alfredo Gutiérrez, Renato Capriles, and Billo's Caracas Boys.
