= La Ceiba Municipality =

La Ceiba Municipality Municipio La Ceiba
- Municipality
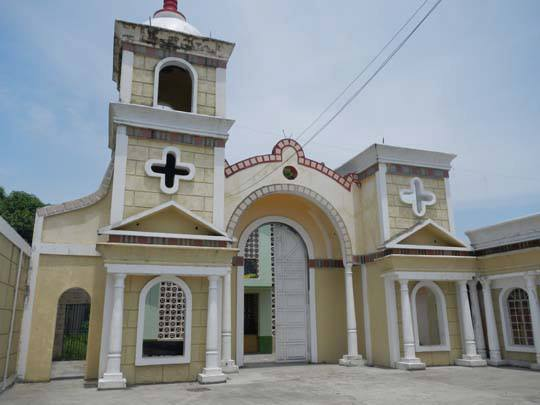
- The Church of Saint-Cœur-de-Jésus in Santa Apolonia, the capital of the municipality

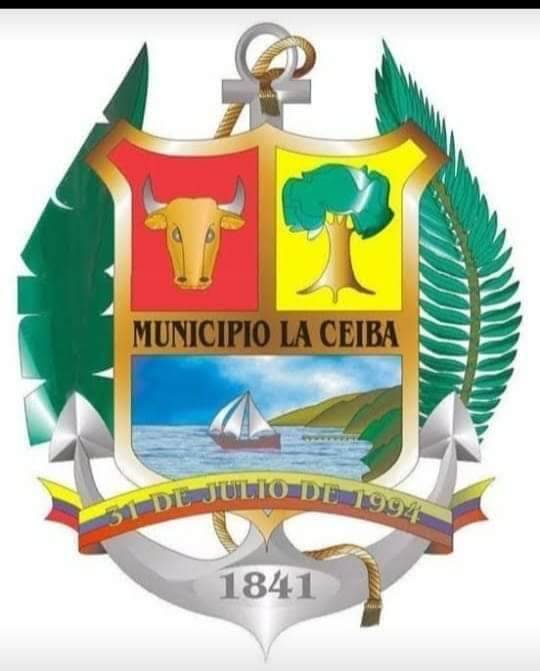
- Flag Seal

- Location in Trujillo

- Location in Venezuela
- Coordinates: 9°28′35″N 71°03′20″W
- Country: Venezuela
- State: Trujillo
- Established: 30 January 1995
- Municipal seat: Santa Apolonia

Government
  - Mayor: Tagasy Reyes Durán (PSUV)

Area
  - Total: 386 km^{2} (149 sq mi)
- Elevation: 32 m (105 ft)

Population (2011)
  - Total: 26,301
  - Density: 68.1/km^{2} (176/sq mi)
- Time zone: UTC−4 (VET)

La Ceiba is one of the 20 municipalities of the state of Trujillo, Venezuela. The municipality occupies an area of 386 km^{2} with a population of 26,301 inhabitants according to the 2011 census. Its shire town is Santa Apolonia.

== Parishes ==
The municipality consists of the following four parishes:

- El Progreso
- La Ceiba
- Santa Apolonia
- Tres de Febrero
