= Andrés Gil (musician) =

Colombian musician, songwriter, and teacher

Andrés "El Turco" Gil
- Also known as: El Turco; El Rey del Disonante
- Born: Andrés Eliécer Gil Torres; 30 October 1948 (age 77); Villanueva, Colombia
- Genres: Vallenato

Andrés Eliécer Gil Torres (Note: In this Spanish name, the first or paternal surname is Gil and the second or maternal family name is Torres.) (born 1948), also known as El Turco Gil, is a Colombian musician, songwriter, and teacher. Gil is the founder and head of the vallenato school Academia de Música Vallenata in Valledupar, and created the children's vallenato band Los Niños del Vallenato. In 2015 Radio Nacional de Colombia wrote that "Gil's work has for the past 15 years focused on helping displaced children, children who have suffered Colombian violence in some form, to reintegrate into society."

== Biography ==
=== Early life ===
Andrés "El Turco" Gil was born on 30 October 1948 in Villanueva, in the Colombian department of La Guajira. His father was Juan Manuel Gil, trumpeter and director of the Orquesta de Juancho Gil, and his mother was Luisa Torres. On the day of his birth Gil's grandfather gave him the nickname "El Turco", which he has been called ever since.

As a child, Gil trained to be an orchestral musician like his father. He could play trumpet and read sheet music by the age of 7, and he learned saxophone, clarinet, and trombone. He encountered vallenato music at parrandas organised by his mother at their home, and started learning to play accordion on the instrument owned by Emiliano Zuleta.

=== Music career ===
Gil got his own diatonic button accordion around 1966–7, while living in Valledupar. His first LP was released in 1967; he was accompanied by vocalist "Pibe" Rivera, and the album included 3 of his own compositions. He also led a band that released records as Andrés "El Turco" Gil y Su Conjunto.

In 1969, Antonio María Peñaloza travelled to Valledupar to take part in the unpublished song competition of the Vallenato Legend Festival. He asked around for an accordionist who could read music, and was pointed to Gil. Soon afterwards Peñaloza moved to Valledupar, and there Gil studied with him for 5 years.

=== The Academia de Música Vallenata ===
At the 1973 Vallenato Legend Festival, Gil watched the child accordionist competition and found the repertoire of the performers to be limited. He wanted children to learn to play accordion with more musical depth. In 1979 he started teaching accordion to children in his home in Valledupar, and in 1985 he formally founded the Academia de Música Vallenata, (Note: The school is also called the Academia Vallenata, and often with Gil's name attached, as in "Academia Vallenata Turco Gil" or "Academia de Música Vallenata Andrés Gil Torres".) the first vallenato music school.

Notable alumni of the Academia de Música Vallenata include Sergio Luis Rodríguez, Cristian Camilo Peña, El Cocha Molina, and Wendy Corzo.

In 1999, Gil created the group Los Niños del Vallenato from some of the best students of his school. The group's first performance was in March 1999 at the Festival Internacional de Acordeón Infantil in Panama, and they played for US president Bill Clinton at the White House in December 1999. Los Niños del Vallenato have since played around the world in countries including Norway, Japan, China, Argentina, Portugal, Italy, and the UK.

== Musical style and compositions ==
Gil's notable compositions include the song "La Cachaquita", which he recorded with vocalist Gabriel Chamorro, and the paseo "Qué Bonito es Amar Así". He has also had some success recording the compositions of other people, including Mateo Torres Barrera's "La Rosa" and Octavio Daza's "El Cansancio del Poeta".

Gil's style on the accordion led to his nickname "El Rey del Disonante" (Spanish for "the king of dissonance"). He was the first vallenato accordinist to play with the full chromatic scale, about which Alfredo Gutiérrez said "El Turco Gil was 30 years ahead of vallenato music...vallenato has always been very poor in harmony, and he began to do chromatic, innovative things."

In 1977, Gil developed his own vallenato rhythm which was a blend of paseo and cumbia, and which he called paturky. He recorded some songs in the style, including "Soy Tuyo" (written by Teodoro López), "Me Llaman Querendón" (Juan de Dios Torres), and "Varita de Caña" (Crescencio Salcedo), but the style did not catch on.
