= Omar Geles =

Colombian accordionist, singer, and songwriter

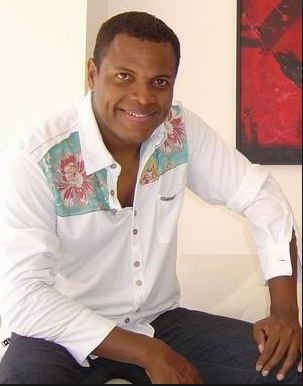
- Geles in 2013

Background information
- Born: Omar Antonio Geles Suárez; 15 February 1967; Valledupar, Colombia
- Died: 21 May 2024 (aged 57) Valledupar, Colombia
- Genres: Vallenato
- Years active: 1985–2024
- Spouse: Maren García

Omar Antonio Geles Suárez (Note: In this Spanish name, the first or paternal surname is Geles and the second or maternal family name is Suárez.) (1967–2024) was a Colombian accordionist, singer, and songwriter. He was crowned Vallenato King after winning the accordionist competition of the Vallenato Legend Festival in 1989, and wrote hundreds of songs, which have been recorded by artists including Diomedes Díaz and Patricia Teherán.

== Biography ==
Omar Antonio Geles Suárez was born on 15 February 1967 in Valledupar, in the Colombian department of Cesar, to Hilda Suárez Castilla and Roberto Geles. His father bought him an accordion when he was 4, and he learned to play by listening to vallenato songs like Juancho Polo Valencia's "Lucero Espiritual" on the radio. As a teenager he would play accordion for his mother while she did housework.

=== Songwriting career ===
Geles formed the band Los Diablitos with Miguel Morales in 1985; in 2004 the band was renamed La Gente de Omar Geles. Geles wrote his first song "Te Esperaré" in 1986, and recorded it with Los Diablitos.

In total Geles wrote around 900 songs that have been recorded by many different artists, with hits including "Tarde lo Conocí" for Patricia Teherán, "Cuatro Rosas" for Jorge Celedón, "No Puedo Vivir Sin Ti" and "No Intentes" for Diomedes Díaz, "Me Gusta, Me Gusta" and "A Blanco y Negro" for Silvestre Dangond, "Amor a Siete Nares" for Poncho Zuleta, and "El Amor Más Grande del Planeta" for Felipe Peláez.

Geles' song "Los Caminos de la Vida", which he wrote about his mother, is one of the most successful vallenato songs. He recorded the song in 1993 with Los Diablitos and Jesús Manuel Estrada, and it has since been recorded over 30 times.

=== The Vallenato Legend Festival ===
Geles competed at the Vallenato Legend Festival for the first time in 1981, in the child accordionist category, coming second behind Miguel Avendaño. In 1985 he won in the amateur accordionist category, and in 1987 was King of Kings of the amateur accordionists.

In 1989 Geles won the professional accordionist competition of the Vallenato Legend Festival, and was crowned Vallenato King. He was accompanied by Luis Carlos "Azabache" Varela on caja and Reinaldo "El Papi" Díaz on guacharaca. His winning songs were the paseo "Qué Dolor" (written by Luis Enrique Martínez), the merengue "Yo Tengo una Pena" (Lorenzo Morales), the son "El Regreso" (Romualdo Brito) and the puya "La Fiesta de los Pájaros" (Sergio Moya Molina). Geles competed for the King of Kings title three times, in 1997, 2007, and 2017. Following his death, the 2025 festival was dedicated to him, and he was named posthumous King of Kings.

=== Personal life and death ===
Geles was married to Maren García. He had hypertension, and died on 21 May 2024 in Valledupar after having a heart attack while playing tennis.
