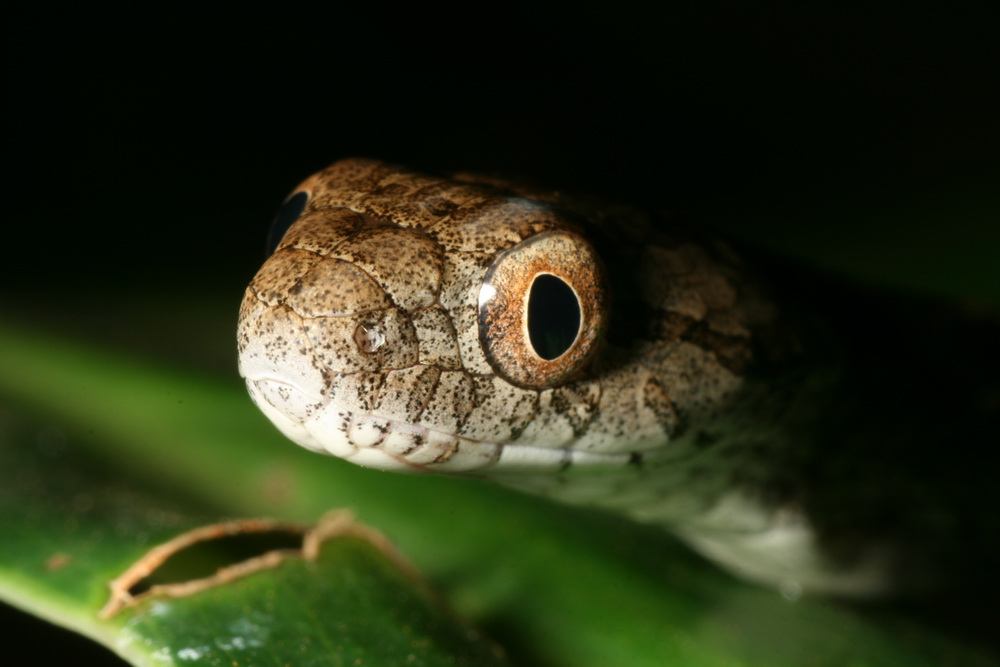

Conservation status
- Least Concern (IUCN 3.1)

Scientific classification
- Kingdom: Animalia
- Phylum: Chordata
- Class: Reptilia
- Order: Squamata
- Suborder: Serpentes
- Family: Colubridae
- Genus: Thamnodynastes
- Species: T. pallidus

Binomial name
- Thamnodynastes pallidus (Linnaeus, 1758)

Synonyms
- Coluber pallidus Linnaeus, 1758; Coluber strigilis Thunberg, 1787; Natrix punctatissima Wagler, 1824; Coluber nattereri Mikan, 1828; Thamnodynastes punctatissimus — Wagler, 1830; Dipsas punctatissima — Schlegel, 1837; Sibon puctatissimus — Berthold, 1840; Thamnodynastes pallidus — Andersson, 1899; Dryophylax pallidus — Amaral, 1930; Thamnodynastes pallidus — J. Peters & Orejas-Miranda, 1970

= Thamnodynastes pallidus =

Species of snake

Thamnodynastes pallidus, the Amazon coastal house snake, is a species of snake in the family Colubridae. The species is endemic to South America.

== Geographic range ==
T. pallidus is found in Argentina, Bolivia, Brazil, Colombia, French Guiana, Guyana, Paraguay, Peru, Suriname, and Venezuela.
