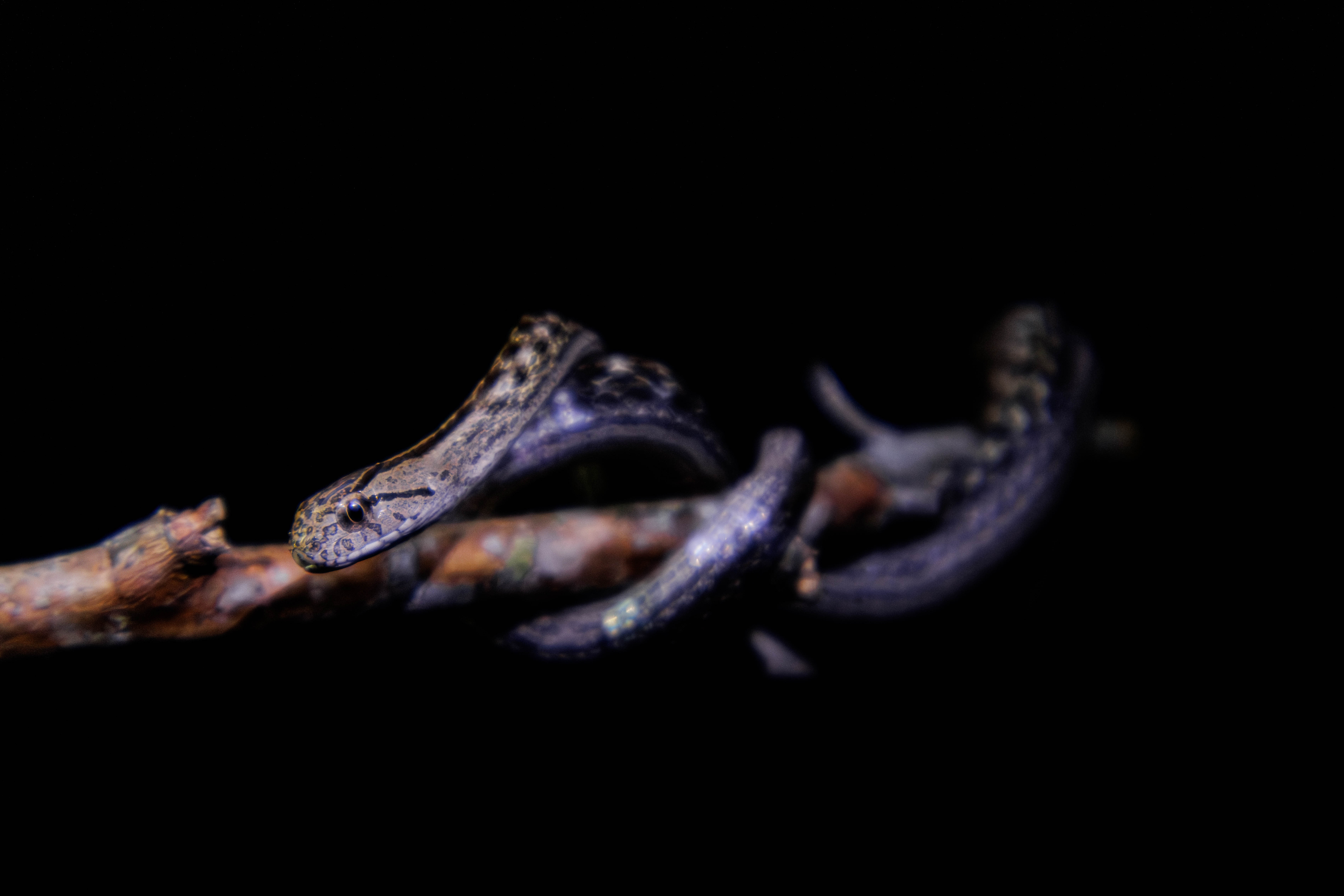
- Individual of D. nattereri in São Paulo, Brazil

Scientific classification
- Kingdom: Animalia
- Phylum: Chordata
- Class: Reptilia
- Order: Squamata
- Suborder: Serpentes
- Family: Colubridae
- Genus: Dryophylax
- Species: D. nattereri

Binomial name
- Dryophylax nattereri (Mikan, 1820)

= Dryophylax nattereri =

Species of reptile

Dryophylax nattereri, the Amazon coastal house snake or northern coastal house snake, is a species of snake in the family Colubridae.

== Etymology ==
Common names include Amazon Coastal House Snake (pallidus), Northern Coastal House Snake (strigilis). In Portuguese, Cobra-Corre-Campo, Cobra-do-Mato, Corre-Campo, Corredeira, Jararaca-Falsa, Jararaquinha and Ubicorá f, are the common names for this species.

The name is synonymous with Coluber nattereri, Thermodynastes nattereri, Thermodynastes cf. nattereri and Thermodynastes pallidus.

== Description ==
These snakes contain a pattern of 19-19-15 on dorsal scales. These scales are slightly keeled and smooth. They typically have one apical pit, one preocular scale and two postocular scales. Their hemipenis is marginally bilobed with spiculate and papillate short lobes and calyces. There is a distinct conchal process of the prefrontal bone, and the medial maxillary process of the ectopterygoid can be twice as long as the lateral maxillary process. The articulation of the maxilla- ectopterygoid aligns with the palatinopterygoid articulation.

== Habitat and behavior ==
The distribution od D. marahuaquensis is several countries in South America. It can be found in Guyana, Suriname, French Guiana, Brazil (Amapa, Bahia, Pernambuco, Paraíba, Minas Gerais), Peru, Venezuela (specifically Cojedes), Colombia, Bolivia, and Ecuador. (Kornacker 1999)

== Life cycle ==
The species exhibit a viviparous mode of reproduction.
