= Arjona, Bolívar =

Arjona
- Municipality and town
- Flag Coat of arms
- Nickname: La tierra del bollo de mazorca
- Location of the municipality and town of Arjona in the Bolívar Department of Colombia

- Location in Colombia
- Coordinates: 10°15′31″N 75°20′46″W
- Country: Colombia
- Department: Bolívar Department
- Founded: 1775

Government
  - Mayor: Gustavo Perez

Area
  - Municipality and town: 589.6 km^{2} (227.6 sq mi)
  - Urban: 7.05 km^{2} (2.72 sq mi)
- Elevation: 63 m (207 ft)

Population (2018 census)
  - Municipality and town: 69,503
  - Density: 117.9/km^{2} (305.3/sq mi)
  - Urban: 55,134
  - Urban density: 7,820/km^{2} (20,300/sq mi)
- Demonym: Arjonero
- Area code: 57 + 5
- Website: Official website (in Spanish)

Arjona is a town and municipality located in the Bolívar Department, northern Colombia, about 30 km southeast of Cartagena de Indias.

Its primary activity is farming and producing the main recognized product, called Bollo by native people from there.

== Notable people ==
- Jeimy Arrieta, accordionist
- Ernesto Frieri, professional baseball player
- Ronaldo Hernández, professional baseball player
- José Quintana, professional baseball player

== Climate ==
Climate data for Arjona (Sincerin), elevation 10 m (33 ft), (1981–2010)
Month	Jan	Feb	Mar	Apr	May	Jun	Jul	Aug	Sep	Oct	Nov	Dec	Year
Mean daily maximum °C (°F)	34.0 (93.2)	34.8 (94.6)	34.9 (94.8)	34.5 (94.1)	32.9 (91.2)	33.3 (91.9)	33.1 (91.6)	33.1 (91.6)	32.5 (90.5)	32.0 (89.6)	31.8 (89.2)	32.4 (90.3)	33.2 (91.8)
Daily mean °C (°F)	27.4 (81.3)	27.7 (81.9)	28.1 (82.6)	28.2 (82.8)	27.9 (82.2)	28.0 (82.4)	28.1 (82.6)	27.7 (81.9)	27.4 (81.3)	27.2 (81.0)	27.3 (81.1)	27.3 (81.1)	27.7 (81.9)
Mean daily minimum °C (°F)	21.6 (70.9)	22.0 (71.6)	22.4 (72.3)	23.8 (74.8)	24.0 (75.2)	24.1 (75.4)	24.0 (75.2)	23.8 (74.8)	23.7 (74.7)	23.5 (74.3)	23.2 (73.8)	22.4 (72.3)	23.2 (73.8)
Average precipitation mm (inches)	6.4 (0.25)	18.0 (0.71)	28.9 (1.14)	89.9 (3.54)	152.6 (6.01)	128.1 (5.04)	154.3 (6.07)	161.5 (6.36)	193.9 (7.63)	195.3 (7.69)	129.3 (5.09)	49.2 (1.94)	1,181.6 (46.52)
Average precipitation days (≥ 1.0 mm)	1	2	3	7	12	11	11	13	13	15	11	5	95
Average relative humidity (%)	81	80	81	82	84	84	84	84	85	87	85	84	83
Mean monthly sunshine hours	257.3	223.0	201.5	168.0	158.1	168.0	189.1	189.1	141.0	142.6	165.0	223.2	2,225.9
Mean daily sunshine hours	8.3	7.9	6.5	5.6	5.1	5.6	6.1	6.1	4.7	4.6	5.5	7.2	6.1
Source: Instituto de Hidrologia Meteorologia y Estudios Ambientales
