= Patricia Teherán Romero =

Colombian singer and songwriter

Patricia Teherán
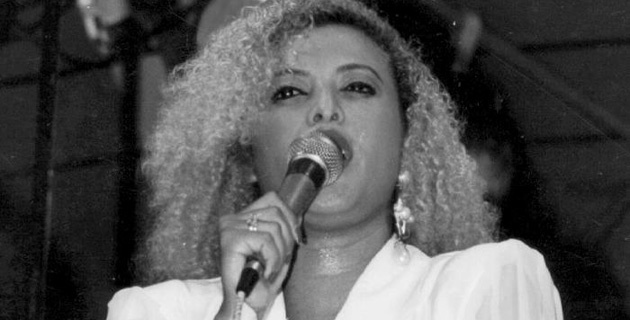

Background information
- Birth name: Patricia Teherán Romero
- Born: 10 June 1969; Cartagena, Colombia
- Died: 19 January 1995 (aged 25); Loma de Arena, Santa Catalina, Colombia
- Genres: Vallenato
- Formerly of: Las Musas del Vallenato; Las Diosas del Vallenato

Patricia Teherán Romero (Note: In this Spanish name, the first or paternal surname is Teherán and the second or maternal family name is Romero.) (10 June 1969 Cartagena de Indias – 19 January 1995 Loma de Arena, Santa Catalina) was a Colombian singer and songwriter, considered one of the most important female vocalists in the history of vallenato.

== Biography ==
=== Early life ===
Teherán was born on 10 June 1969 in the Nuevo Bosque neighborhood of Cartagena, in the Colombian department of Bolívar. Her parents were Luz Romero and Carlos Teherán.

=== Music career ===
Teherán began her career singing with various groups in Cartagena including Orquesta Barbacoas and Alfonso y su Octava Potencia. In 1988 accordionist Graciela Ceballos moved to Cartagena, and invited Teherán to be part of a new vallenato musical project consisting only of women, which became known as Las Musas del Vallenato. The group recorded three LPs: Con Alma de Mujer (1990), Guerreras del Amor (1991), and Explosivas y Sexys (1993).

Las Musas split due to personal differences and Teherán formed a new group, Las Diosas del Vallenato, with Maribel Cortina on accordion. Las Diosas had a major hit with "Tarde Lo Conocí", written by Omar Geles. Las Diosas played a style of vallenato adapted for modern audiences. Their only album with Teherán was Con Aroma de Mujer, released in 1994. The album includes the song "Dueño De Mi Pasión", which Teherán wrote. After Teherán's death in 1995, Las Diosas took on Rosalba Chico as vocalist and recorded two albums before Chico died in 1997.

=== Personal life and death ===
Teherán had one son, Yury Alexander Teherán, whose father was Rodrigo Castillo.

Teherán died on 19 January 1995 in Loma de Arena, an area of Santa Catalina. She was driving from Barranquilla to Cartagena when one of the tires of her car exploded, and the vehicle lost control. Her husband Victor Sierra also died in the crash. Ten days after her death, Codiscos released Adiós a la Diosa, a compilation of Teherán's hits and unreleased songs.

== Albums ==
- Con Alma de Mujer (1990) with Las Musas del Vallenato
- Guerreras del Amor (1991) with Las Musas del Vallenato
- Explosivas y Sexys (1993) with Las Musas del Vallenato
- Con Aroma de Mujer (1994) with Las Diosas del Vallenato
- Adiós a la Diosa (1995, posthumous compilation)
