= Hemipenis =

Male sex organ in squamate reptiles

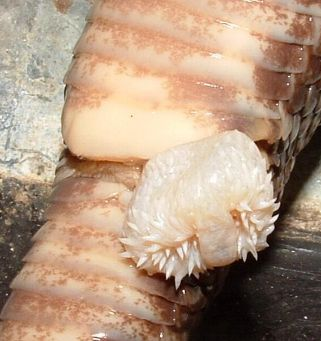
An everted hemipenis of a North American rattlesnake (Crotalus adamanteus).

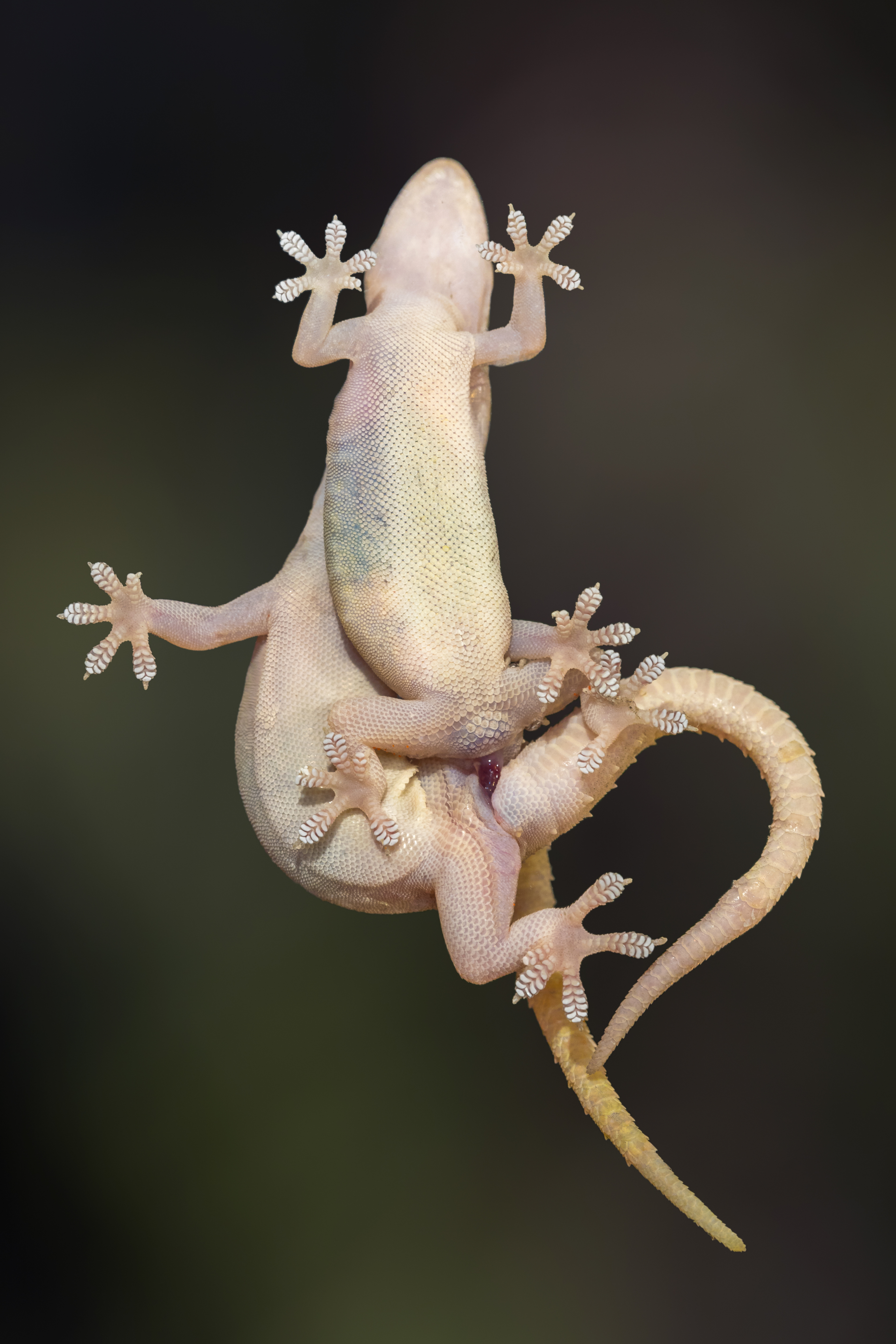
Common house geckos, mating, ventral view with hemipenis inserted in the cloaca

A hemipenis (pl.: hemipenes) is one of a pair of intromittent organs of male squamates (snakes and lizards). Hemipenes are usually held inverted within the body, and are everted for reproduction via erectile tissue. They come in a variety of shapes, depending on species, with ornamentation such as spikes.

== Background ==
The hemipenis is the intromittent organ of Squamata, which is the second largest order of vertebrates with over 9,000 species distributed around the world. They differ from the intromittent organs of most other amniotes such as mammals, archosaurs and turtles that have a single genital tubercle, as squamates have paired, separate genitalia. Squamate hemipenes also develop from a different cell origin, originating from the same embryonic cells that produce the limbs, whereas mammalian penises arise from the embryonic cells that develop the tail.

== Evolution ==
Much debate continues regarding the evolutionary origin of hemipenes and their relationship to the intromittent organs of other species. However, embryonic and molecular research is beginning to shed light on the origin of the hemipenis.

=== Unpaired penis as ancestral form ===
This theory proposes that the single unpaired penis is the ancestral state for amniotes, and that this trait was retained by most amniotes today. A look at the embryonic underpinning of hemipenes and penises of other animals suggests that there are fundamental differences in their developmental stages, particularly their origin of development relative to the embryonic cloaca. Specifically, the hemipenes of Squamata are found to develop on the posterior side, while the paired genitals of non-squamate Amniota develop on the anterior side. This developmentally significant difference suggests that the two types of penises could have distinct homologies, and it is thought that this could be attributed to variance of signaling genes during embryological development.

=== Speciation ===
Hemipenes are also being used to study speciation among Squamata, especially in identifying cryptic diversity and understanding taxonomy at a species level. One study conducted in 2015 investigated anole speciation through hemipenis variation, and found that anole hemipenial morphology evolved six times faster than other non-genital morphological features. Such studies can help researchers understand adaptive radiation and recover phylogenetic relationships, especially between species that are morphologically very similar.

== Morphology ==
=== Identification ===
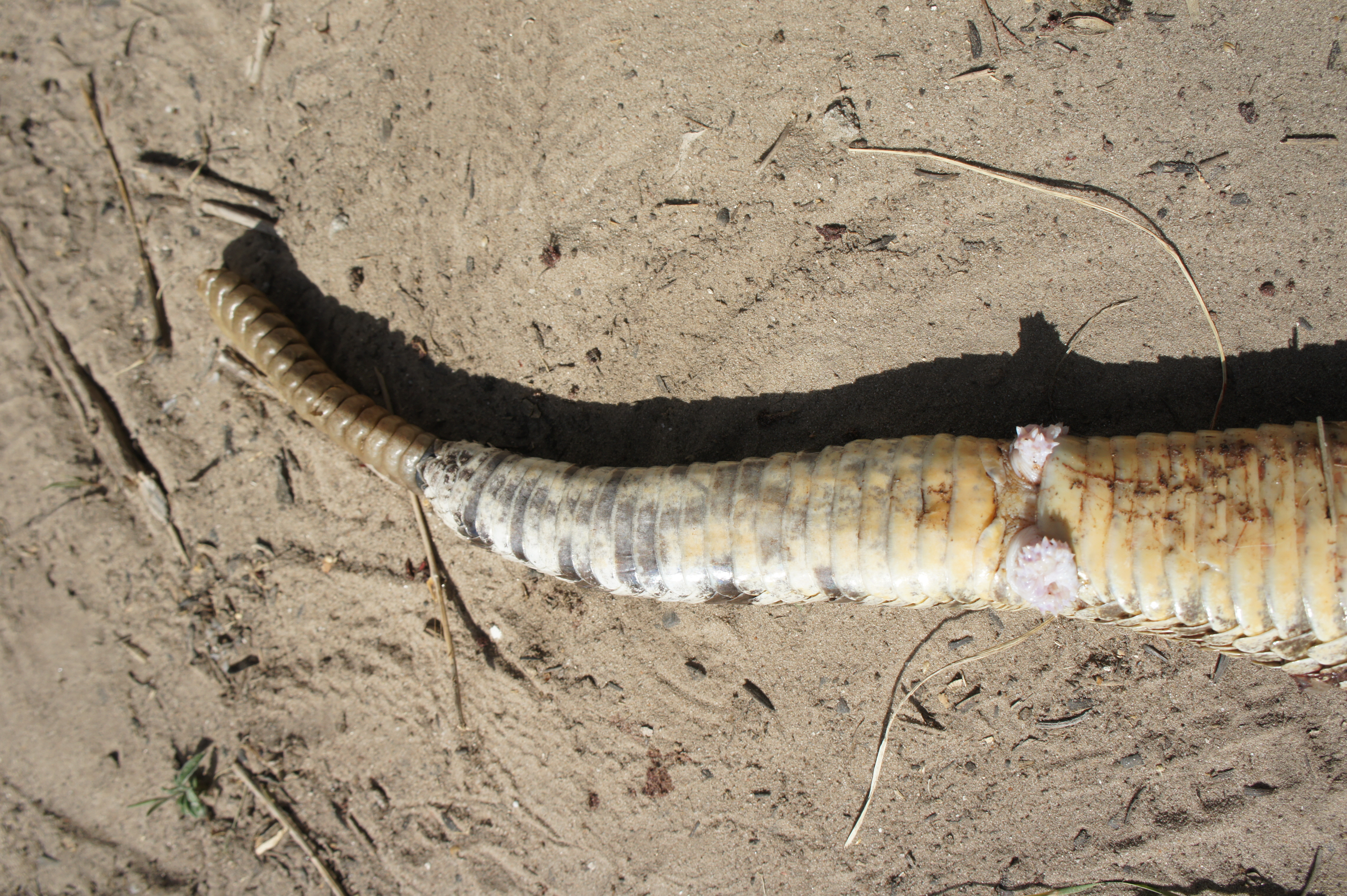
Hemipenes on the western diamondback rattlesnake (Crotalus atrox)

Hemipenes can be examined on a living snake or lizard by gently squeezing on the tail and massaging towards the vent, which is the cloacal opening on the underside of the tail. This will cause the hemipenis to evert out of the body. However, this method can also make it difficult to identify the sex of a dead specimen if it is damaged or dry.

While the presence of hemipenes is an indicator of a specimen being male, its absence should not be immediately inferred as the specimen being female. Juveniles of a species may appear similar in size to mature adults, but possess little-developed hemipenes that might not be easily recognizable. It is also possible to misinterpret the scent gland papillae by the cloaca of the female as a hemipenis, as it can also protrude and be quite large. However, they will be smaller than male hemipenes and have no visible blood vessels, though a red tip may be visible.

=== Structure and shape variation ===
Hemipenes can be found in a variety of shapes and sizes, but foundationally, have the same general structure. They are made up of two hemipenises tucked under the tail side by side or stacking; bottom and top, with each of the lobes exhibiting a range of ornamentation, including spicules and hooks. Hemipenes also have an outer groove called the sulcus spermaticus, which transports sperm through the outside, rather than the inside, of the organ. This is structurally different from the human penis, which has sperm travel inside the organ through the vas deferens and the urethra.

The surface of hemipenes is one of the most interesting and unique features, and is often covered in sharp spines and spicules that are organized in formations called rosettes. However, species with relatively smooth hemipene surfaces also exist. For example, the hemipenis of the Siamese spitting cobra (Naja siamensis) is smooth with blunt ends, while that of the many-spotted cat-eyed snake (Boiga multomaculata) is entirely covered in hooked spines and spicules. Yet despite this assortment of hemipenis designs, no association has been found between the design of hemipenes and the disposition or danger of the animal. Rather, it is believed that hemipenes found in the squamate world exhibit such diverse designs to facilitate mating compatibility amongst individuals of the same species, a theory that is referred to as the "lock-and-key mechanism".

== Function ==
=== Lock-and-key mechanism ===
The lock-and-key mechanism or hypothesis is the idea that genital morphology has evolved to maintain reproductive isolation between species, by ensuring that mating can only occur between a male and female of the same species. The idea was first postulated in 1844 by French entomologist, Leon Dufour, who observed the diversity of genital morphology among Dipteran flies. It is thought that the physiological differences between species prevents hybridization. The genital lock-and-key mechanism can operate in two ways: by the direct prevention of copulation and insemination due to physical incompatibilities, or by a sensory lock-and-key that induce behavioral responses that disrupt mating attempts. This mechanism is found across the animal kingdom, from Lepidoptera to Squamata.

In snakes and lizards, morphological differences in the reproductive organs are believed to exist to help the male copulate with the female. Spikes and hooks are thought to assist the male in fixing the hemipenis in place during mating, and are made specifically compatible to the female of the species. For example, species with branched hemipenes have females with branched cloacas, and species with many spikes have females with thicker cloacal walls, compared to those of species with males having little or no spines. This huge variety among the reproductive organs of Squamata is of interest to taxonomists, as it may be able to shed light on evolutionary relationships among reptiles.

=== Sexual conflict theory ===
The function of the ornamentation of the hemipenes is still being explored by researchers, but one study supports the theory that the spines that can be found on many hemipenes is a trait to assist in longer, and hence more successful, reproduction for males. Through surgically removing the large basal spine of the red-sided garter snake, researchers found that while males were still able to mate, the duration of mating and the depth of copulation were much shorter than the unaffected control males, indicating that the spines play a crucial role in the male's ability to mate successfully with the female. Females responded to the male hemipenis with strong vaginal contractions that prevented longer mating. To test that the purpose of the contractions was to shorten mating time, researchers anesthetized the female to prevent the contractions and found that mating did indeed last longer.

=== Cryptic female choice ===
Often times, female snakes and lizards also have the ability to control whether they get pregnant immediately after mating or not, to account for the fact that the ideal time for mating may not translate to the most optimal time for ovulation and gestation. Consequently, females can store sperm internally for as long as five years, or possibly longer. This phenomenon is known as cryptic female choice, as the physiological mechanisms making this possible are hidden within the body, and the female has the ability to influence when egg fertilization occurs.

While the exact mechanism of how the female controls the stored sperm to fertilize her eggs remains unclear, it is believed that the specialized pockets found in the reproductive tract play a key role. As a result, a female can mate with multiple males and choose when to fertilize her eggs. Furthermore, females can also produce offspring that can feature genetic material from multiple males in a single clutch if she mated with more than one male.

A product of this system is that males are not guaranteed to successfully reproduce and bear offspring from a single mating. Therefore, it is in their interest to mate with as many females as possible to increase their chance of passing on genetic material. This is one hypothesized reason for males having two penises instead of one: as each hemipenis is associated with one testis and only one side can be used during mating, having a second hemipenis functions as a "backup" and ensures that mating can continue even if one side were to run out of sperm.

It is important to distinguish between cryptic female choice and facultative parthenogenesis, a form of asexual reproduction. Due to the female's ability to get pregnant long after she has been in contact with a male, it is difficult to distinguish between the two in ambiguous cases. In such circumstances, molecular testing techniques can be used to identify whether her offspring share all or some of their genetic make-up with their mother.

== Hemiclitoris ==
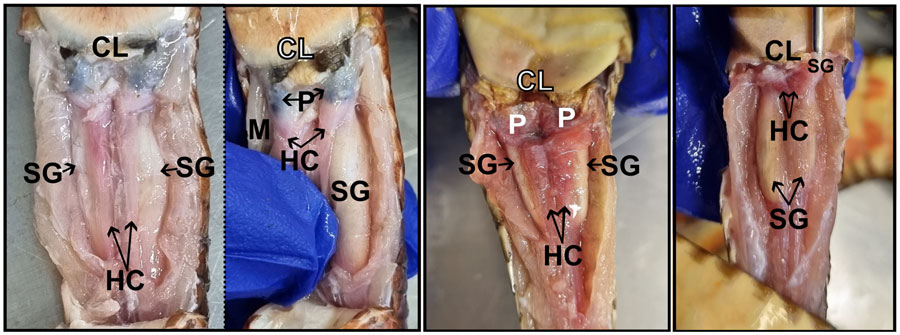
The hemiclitorises (labeled "HC") of a few snakes shown under dissection

Most research in the area of squamate reproductive organs has focused on the male hemipenis, but recent studies have investigated the homologous paired erectile structure in females, dubbed "hemiclitoris" (pl.: hemiclitorises or hemiclitorides). Researchers first investigated females of Phymaturus and Liolaemus lizards and discovered a structure that was previously undescribed. The hemiclitoris was observed to be smaller than a hemipenis, and the organs were consistently observed in the lizards in the study. While the specific functions are yet to be identified, this study brings attention to a Squamata apomorphy that will likely continue to be investigated in detail. A 2022 study showed that nine species of snakes also have hemiclitorises of widely differing structure.

== Other vertebrates ==
Among vertebrates, penises can be found in a variety of shapes, sizes and structures, such as the lymphatic erection mechanism of ratites and the single vascular erectile body of turtles. One of the most similar organs to the squamate hemipenes, however, is the four-headed penis of echidnas. One of the most primitive mammals in the world, echidnas possess internal testes like Squamata and similarly alternate usage of sides. Unlike Squamata, however, their singular penis is four-headed.

Many marsupials also exhibit bifurcated penises like Squamata, suggesting that this feature may have been passed down from a common ancestor. With such diversity among species, reproductive morphology proves to be extremely helpful in not only understanding the mating mechanisms of specific species, but also the broader evolutionary relationships through time.

== See also ==
- Reproduction of snakes
