= Pedro Ramayá Beltrán =

Colombian flautist and songwriter (1930–2026)

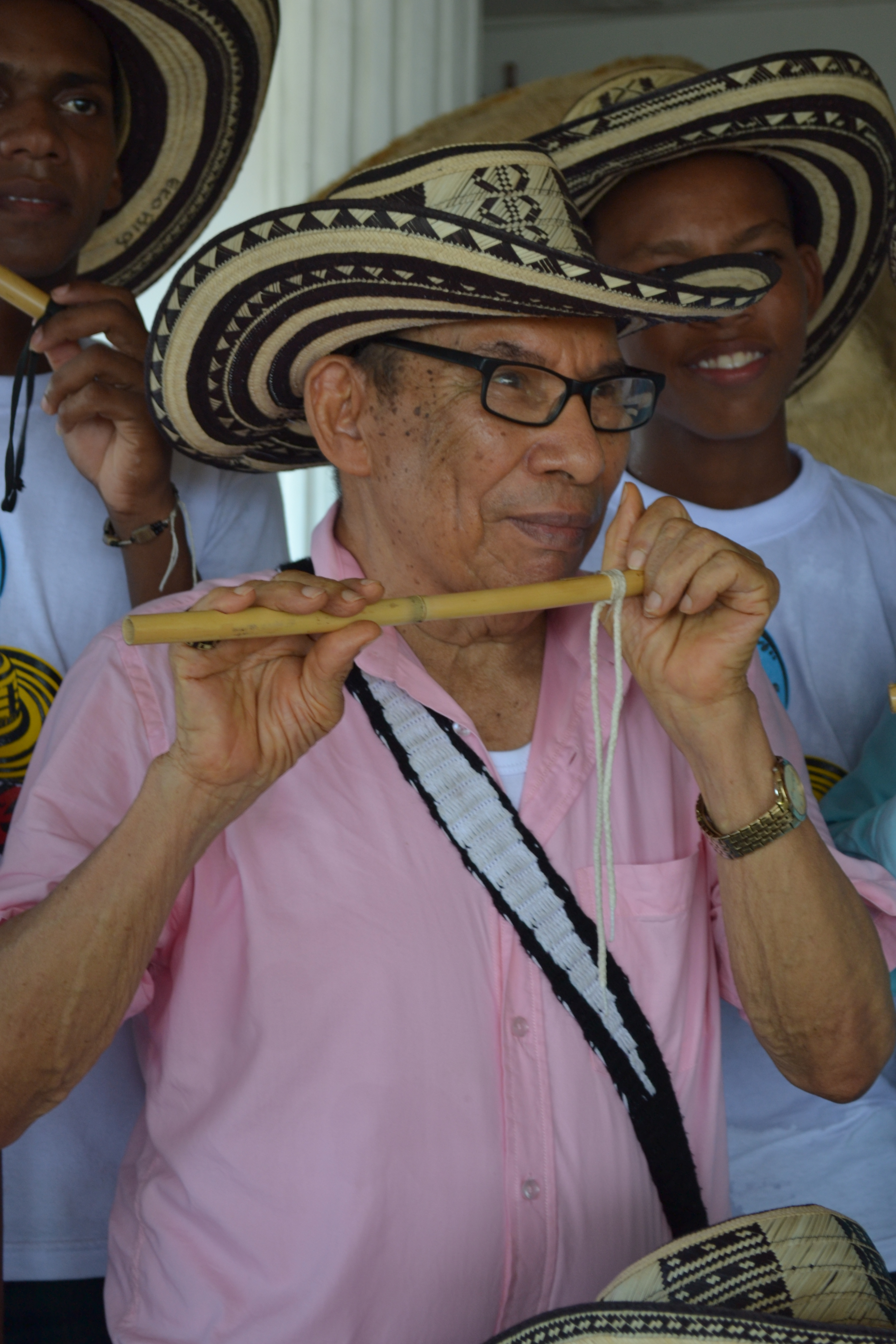
- Beltrán in 2017

Background information
- Also known as: King of the flauta de millo
- Born: Pedro Agustín Beltrán Castro; 5 February 1930; Talaigua Nuevo, Colombia
- Died: 11 April 2026 (aged 96) Barranquilla, Colombia
- Instruments: Flauta de millo

Pedro Agustín Beltrán Castro (Note: In this Spanish name, the first or paternal surname is Beltrán and the second or maternal family name is Castro.) (5 February 1930 – 11 April 2026), also known as Pedro Ramayá Beltrán (Note: Sometimes rendered Pedro Ramayá or Ramayá Beltrán.) or simply Ramayá, was a Colombian flautist and songwriter. He is known for his skill at playing the flauta de millo. Beltrán was a member of Efraín Mejía's band La Cumbia Soledeña, and later led his own group, La Cumbia Moderna de Soledad.

== Life and career ==
Pedro Agustín Beltrán Castro was born on 5 February 1930 in Patico, Talaigua Nuevo, in the Colombian department of Bolívar. According to Beltrán, his father had 46 other children.

As a child Beltrán learned to play flauta de millo, a traditional flute from the Colombian Caribbean. He formed his first band at the age of 12. After his military service he joined La Cumbia Soledeña, the group led by Efraín Mejía. Beltrán later left the group to form his own orchestra, La Cumbia Moderna de Soledad, which included guitar, brass, and percussion alongside the flauta de millo.

Beltrán got the nickname "Ramayá" in 1975 after recording a cumbia version of the song "Ramaya", originally by Afric Simone. He has performed several times at the Barranquilla Carnival, and in 2002 was declared its Rey Momo. Beltrán has written over 300 songs, including notably "Mi Flauta", "La Rebuscona", "La Clavada", and "Mico Ojón Pelúo". In 2023 he was awarded the "lifetime achievement award for bearers of cultural heritage" (Spanish: Premio vida y obra a portadores del patrimonio cultural) by the Colombian Ministry of Culture.

Beltrán died in Barranquilla on 11 April 2026, at the age of 96.
