= Efraín Mejía =

Colombian musician and songwriter

- Born: Efraín Mejía Donado; 1934; Soledad, Colombia
- Died: 2 November 2017 (aged 83) Montería, Colombia

Efraín Mejía Donado (Note: In this Spanish name, the first or paternal surname is Mejía and the second or maternal family name is Donado.) (1934–2017) was a Colombian musician and songwriter. Mejía led the band Cumbia Soledeña for several years, and his compositions were popular at the Barranquilla Carnival, where he was Rey Momo in 1997.

== Biography ==
Efraín Mejía Donado was born in 1934 in Soledad, in the Colombian department of Atlántico. As a child he was taught by a relative to play tambora, flauta de millo, llamador, and guache. His grandmother introduced him to the rhythm of cumbia.

In the mid-1950s, Mejía took over leadership of the band Cumbia Soledeña from his uncle Alejandro. Mejía claimed that Cumbia Soledeña was founded by his great-great-uncle Desiderio Barceló in 1877. In 1961, Pedro Ramayá Beltrán joined the group, and with Mejía released the first ever record featuring a flauta de millo. Cumbia Soledeña released several albums on Polydor, beginning with their debut Pa'Goza el Carnaval in 1964.

In 1997, El Tiempo described Mejía as "the composer of many of the songs that form part of the musical history of Carnival". That year Mejía was made Rey Momo of the Barranquilla Carnival. His notable compositions include "El Garabato", "La Puya Loca", "El Congo Grande", "Josefa Matías", "Las Pilanderas", "El Mapalé", and "La Burra Mocha".

Mejía was married to Gladys Donado, with whom he had five children. In later life he had Alzheimer's. Mejía died aged 83 on 2 November 2017 in hospital in Montería. Beltrán and Alci Acosta spoke at his funeral.
