= Esther Forero =

Colombian singer (1919–2011)

- Born: Esther Forero Celis; 10 December 1919; Barranquilla, Colombia
- Died: 3 June 2011 (aged 91); Barranquilla, Colombia
- Other names: Esthercita Forero/Estercita Forero, La Novia de Barranquilla
- Occupations: Singer, composer Musical career
- Genres: Cumbia, porro, tropical
- Labels: Ansonia, Seeco
- Children: Esther Nouel (1946-2016), Ivan Gonzalez

Esther Forero Celis (10 December 1919 – 3 June 2011), better known as Estercita Forero or "La Novia de Barranquilla" ("Barranquilla's Darling"), was a Colombian singer and composer.

== Early years ==
Esther Forero began to sing at age 4 at family gatherings and theaters of her hometown, Barranquilla. At the age of 14, she made her debut in a radio station named "La Voz de Barranquilla" (The Voice of Barranquilla.) Four years later she toured throughout the Colombian territory. In Bogotá (Colombian capital) she performed at La Media Torta (a venue in that city) and in other theaters, and radio stations.

== International success ==
In 1942, Forero made her first tour abroad. In Panama, she performed on "Radio Estrella de Panamá" (Panamanian radio station), with the accompaniment of pianist and composer, Avelino Muñoz. In 1945, she went to Venezuela where she first popularized the music of the Caribbean coast. She traveled to Santo Domingo (Dominican Republic), where she wrote her first song entitled "Santo Domingo", and the porro (a Colombian cumbia rhythm that developed into its own subgenre) "Pegadita de los hombres", which sold 80,000 copies for three consecutive years. Around 1950, she recorded an album in Puerto Rico with composer Rafael Hernández, which contributed to Colombian music finding an opening among other popular expressions of the Caribbean.

In Cuba, she performed with Pancho Portuondo's orchestra, followed in 1952 by a trip to New York, where she started recording with pianist and composer René Touzet.

== Return to Colombia ==
Esther had two children, a son, Ivan Gonzalez, and a daughter named Esther Nouel. Her older son, Ivan, died at a young age, apparently having been stabbed to death. Ivan's son would also pass away in similar circumstances years later. In her personal life, Forero had a relationship with Bonairean sound engineer Gustavo Nouel (1907-?) with whom she had one daughter (Esther Nouel) when she was 25 or 26 years old. Her daughter, Esther, was matriculated into a school for girls and stayed there as a fulltime student and resident as her Mother immersed herself into musical endeavors possibly favoring that over her family life. Esther Forero and her daughter had a personal fallout lasting several decades but, were reconciled in Esther's latter years before her death.

Esther Forero returned to Colombia in 1959, after 10 years of spreading the country's Caribbean music abroad. She began recording her music with orchestras such as those of Pacho Galán, Nuncira Machado, Aníbal Velásquez, and Clímaco Sarmiento, with singers including Gabriel Romero, Joe Arroyo, and Alfredo Gutiérrez

At Forero's initiative, in 1974, Barranquilla's Carnival brought back performing nightly parades with Cumbiambas (a folkloric rhythm and dance from Colombia) and tamboras(a percussion instrument that originated in the Dominican Republic made of recycled barrels and is played using 2 headed drums.) This night festival became known as La Guacherna.

In 1975, she recorded Érase una vez en La Arenosa ("Once upon a time in the sandy city") – "Arenosa" (sandy) being an endearing term for Barranquilla – under the baton of maestro Pedro "Pete" Vicentini and accompanied by singer Alci Acosta. This recording tells the city's story in song and became an integral part of its culture.

== Recognitions ==
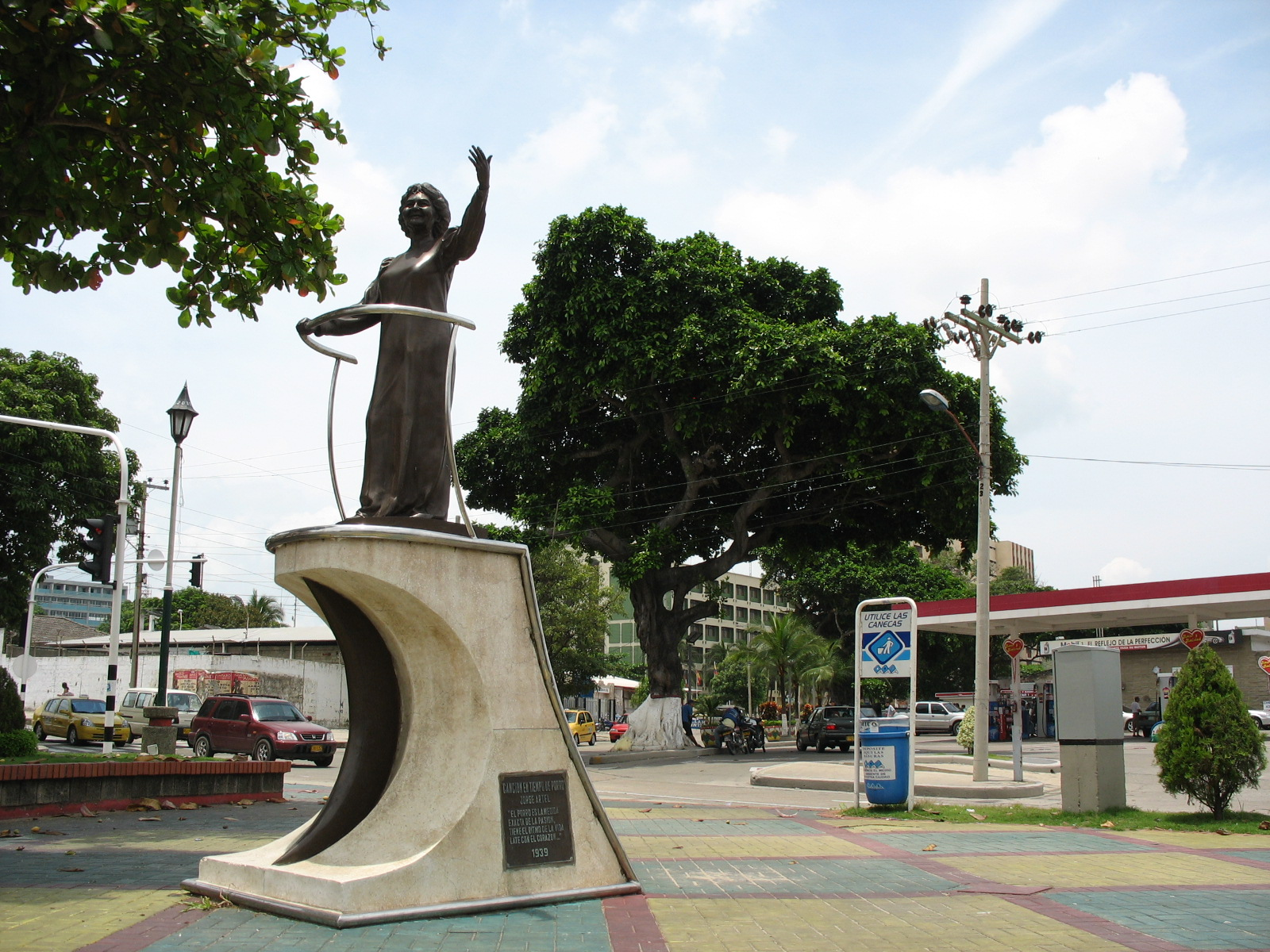
Plaza Esthercita Forero in Barranquilla

Throughout her life, Esther Forero received honors from many Latin American countries in recognition of work done as an ambassador of Colombian music to the world. As a result, the Society of Authors and Composers of Colombia awarded her with the Order of "Santa Cecilia."

The Colombian Ministry of Culture granted her the title "Emeritus" in 1998, citing "For her unquestionable contribution to Colombian music before the world, for her dedicated work, and for having been a spokesperson for the most positive values of our culture in the world." Subsequently, the Colombian House of Representatives granted her the Order "Policarpa Salavarrieta", with the rank of Commander.

== Songs ==
. She was the author of songs such as "Mi vieja Barranquilla" (My Old Barranquilla) (1974), "Luna Barranquillera" (Barranquillian Moon) (1963), "La Guacherna" (A festival)(1976), "Volvió Juanita" (Juanita Returned) (1978), "Palito 'e matarratón" (Matarraton is a type of tree which was local to the Barranquilla area) (1964), "Tambores de Carnaval" (Carnival Drums) (1978), "Nadie ha de saber" (No one should know) (2002), and "El hombre del palo" (The Wooden Man).

On a side note, one of Estercita Forero's grandchildren from her daughter, Esther, named George Stewart, is an American musician and vocalist who has recorded several musical releases of his own with Floridian Death Metal music bands Abysmal, Phalanx Inferno and Nuclear Christ. These bands have had music released under labels in the United States, Europe and Asia.

== Death ==
Esther Forero died on Friday, 3 June 2011 at age 91 at La Asunción Clinic, in her hometown of Barranquilla, after complications in several organs in her body. She arrived at a clinic on May 11th, 2011, with a shoulder dislocation, which later led to convulsions and cerebral ischemia.
