= Waldemar Esteves da Cunha =

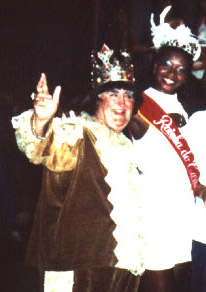
- King Momo Waldemar, in 1988 Carnaval, with queen Mira Silva, at Confetti Battle, at Canal 1
- Born: Waldemar Esteves da Cunha; August 9, 1920; Santos, Brazil
- Died: April 8, 2013 (aged 92); Santos, Brazil
- Occupation: Rei Momo
- Known for: Rei Momo Waldemar
- Spouse: Eunice de Oliveira Cunha
- Children: Sônia, Selma, Waldemar jr, Sílvia

Waldemar Esteves da Cunha (August 9, 1920 – April 8, 2013) was at the time of his death in 2013, the oldest King Momo in Brazil.

== Biography ==
Waldemar Esteves da Cunha was born in the port city of Santos, Brazil, on August 9, 1920. For many years he worked with dental articles in the family company.

In 1950 he was elected King Momo of Santos, after the Dona Dorotea Marathon, a marathon on Santos' beach.

He was Momo of Santos until 1990 and was at the time of his death the oldest King Momo in Brazil. In 1957 he suffered a golpe when Rei Momo Eduardo was elected, from Rio de Janeiro. After 1957, he was Momo until 1990.

Between 1997 and 2000 the Carnival of Santos had some security troubles. The city wanted the Samba Schools to be great as National Carnivals (Rio and São Paulo) and the parades were on the Orla beach, but unfortunately it was all locked.

King Momo Waldemar, during the Carnival of 2001, at the age of 81, came back on the Avenues to lay peace and joy. Unfortunately, nothing happened, and the parades were blocked until 2005. In that year Santos had a new Sambadrome, in Northwestern City, larger than the area of the Orla beach.

Pensioned, Waldemar lived in Santos with his wife. He had four children, six grandchildren and one great-granddaughter. He died in Santos on April 8, 2013 and was buried at Memorial Necrópole Ecumênica.

== Post mortem ==
In 2018, 5 years after his death, the Carnaval Memorial and the Department of Culture organized an exhibition in his honor.

== Gallery ==
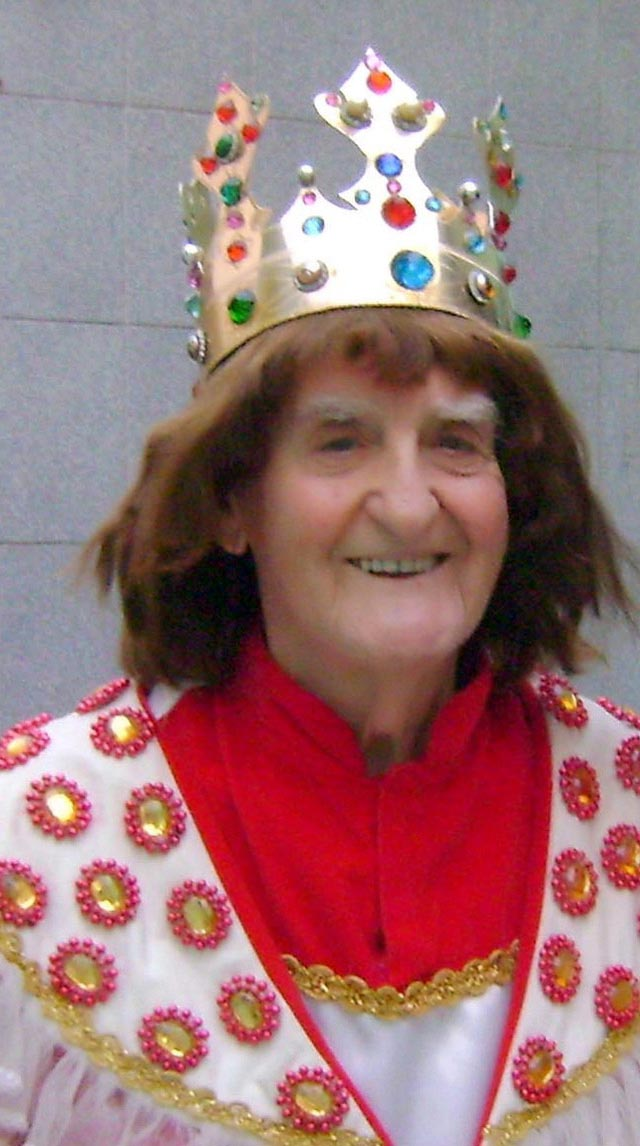
King Momo Waldemar five years before his death. (2008)

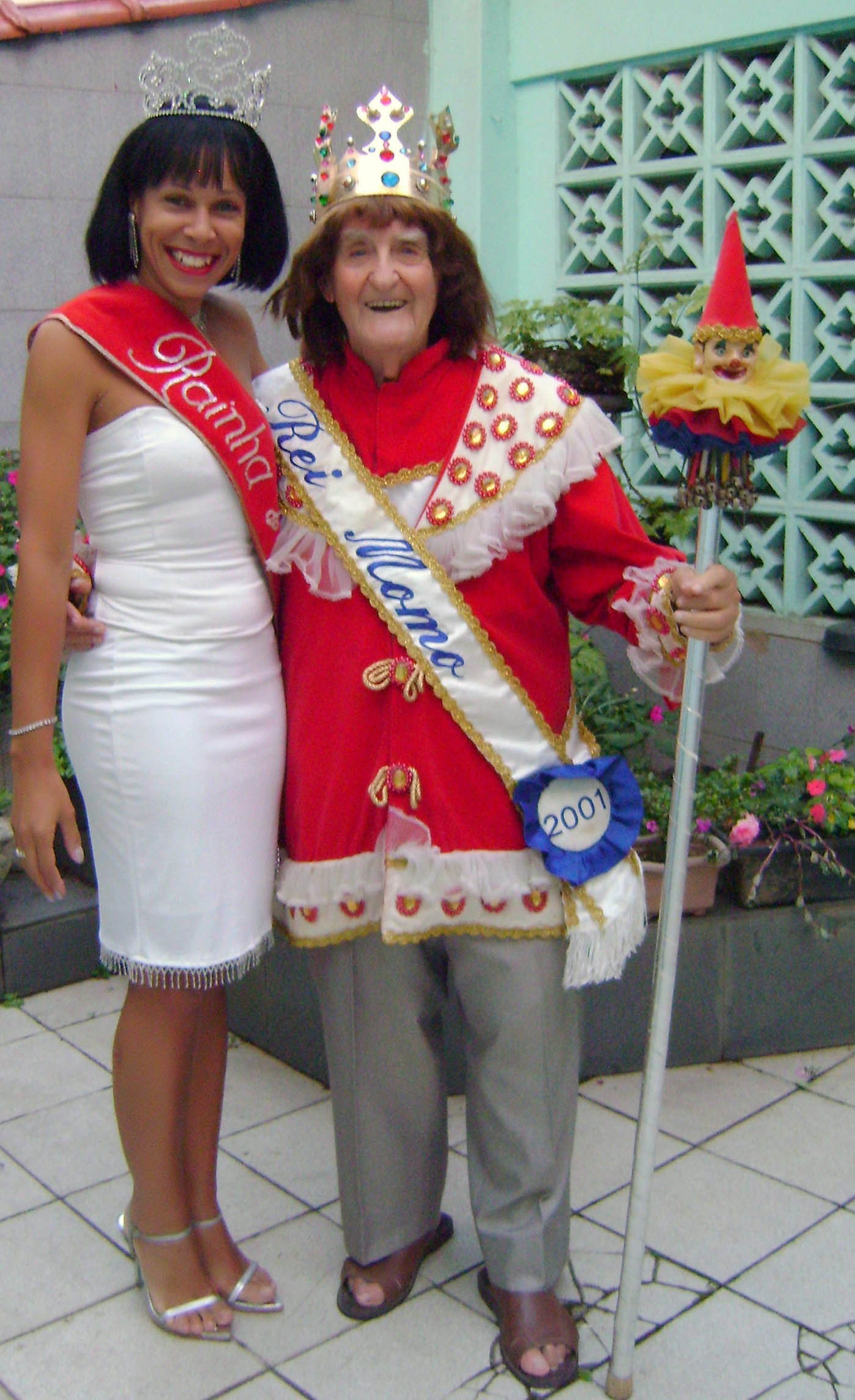
King Momo, with the band of peace-maker 2001, receives courtesy visit of Queen Andréa (Carnival 1989).

King Momo and his son's Waldemar jr tomb, at Memorial Necrópole Ecumênica.
