= Cumbia (Colombia) =

Regional music and dance style

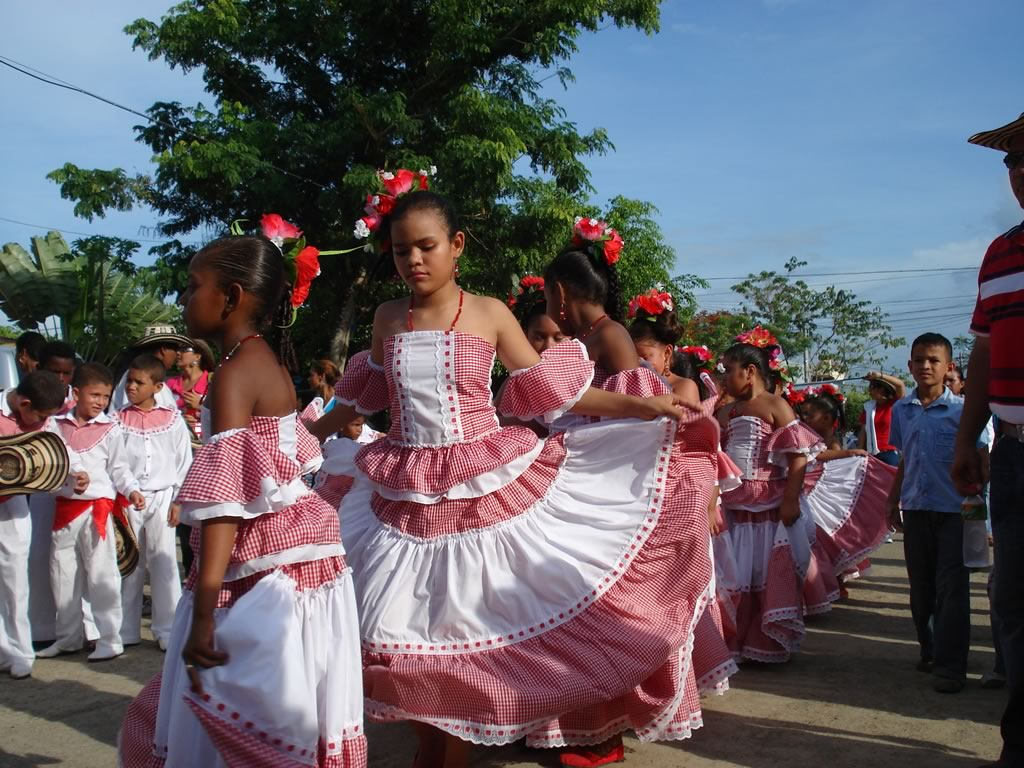
- Stylistic origins: Amerindian music; European music; African music
- Cultural origins: Caribbean region of Colombia
- Typical instruments: Caña de millo; kuisi; tambor alegre; tambor llamador; tambora; caja vallenata; guache; maracas; Güiro; Güira; Cabasa; diatonic button accordion; guacharaca; clarinet

Subgenres
- Cumbia sonidera; cumbia villera; cumbia pegassera; New Chilean cumbia

Fusion genres
- Merecumbé; tecnocumbia; cumbia rap; danzon cumbia; danza cumbia

Regional scenes
- Argentine cumbia; Bolivian cumbia; Colombian cumbia; Costa Rican cumbia; Chilean cumbia; Ecuadorian cumbia; Guatemalan cumbia; Honduran cumbia; Mexican cumbia; Nicaraguan cumbia; Panamanian cumbia; Paraguayan cumbia; Peruvian cumbia; Salvadorian cumbia; Venezuelan cumbia

Cumbia (Spanish pronunciation: [ˈkumbja]) is a folkloric genre and dance from Colombia.

The cumbia is the most representative dance of the coastal region in Colombia, and is danced in pairs with the couple not touching one another as they display the amorous conquest of a woman by a man. The couple performing cumbia dances in a circle around a group of musicians, and it involves the woman holding lit candle(s) in her right hand that she uses to push the man away while she holds her skirt in her left. During the dance, the partners do not touch each other, and the man dances while holding a sombrero vueltiao that he tries to put on the woman's head as a representation of amorous conquest. This dance is originally made to depict the battle that the “black man had to fight to conquer an indigenous woman”. The story continues and the dance shows that this leads to a new generation and is depicting the history of the coast of Colombia.

However Cumbia is much more than just a dance; it is “practica cultural” (cultural practice). Cumbia is an umbrella term, and much like vallenato there are many subcategories. The subcategories are many like music, dance, rhythm, and genre. The genre aspect can be split into two things; Cumbia is a “ complex mix of genres with a caribbean-colombian air in binaria subdivision” and “a category of music for Colombian music with a Caribbean flavor”.

Since the 1940s, commercial or modern Colombian cumbia had expanded to the rest of Latin America, and many countries have had their own variants of cumbia after which it became popular throughout the Latin American regions, including in Argentina, Bolivia, Chile, Costa Rica, Ecuador, El Salvador, Guatemala, Honduras, Mexico, Nicaragua, Panama, Paraguay, Peru, the United States, Uruguay, and Venezuela.

Most Hispanic American countries have made their own regional version of Cumbia, some of them with their own particularity.

== Etymology ==
Most folklorists and musicologists, such as Narciso Garay, Delia Zapata Olivella, and Guillermo Abadia Morales, assume that cumbia is derived from the Bantu root kumbe "to dance", or any other of the many Bantu words with "comb" or "kumb". Cf. samba, macumba.

Another possibility is the Tupi-Guarani word cumbi "murmuring, noise".

Cumbia was also a kind of fine woolen garment produced for the Inca.

In 2006, Colombian musician and musicologist Guillermo Carbo Ronderos said that the etymology of the word cumbia is "still controversial" and that "seems to derive from the Bantu word cumbé".

== Music and heritage ==
Sociologist Adolfo Gonzalez Henriquez, in his work "La música del Caribe colombiano durante la guerra de independencia y comienzos de la República" (Music of the Colombian Caribbean during the war of independence and the beginning of the Republic), includes a text of Admiral José Prudencio Padilla which records cumbiambas and indigenous gaitas during the festival of John the Baptist in the neighboring town of Arjona, a few days before the naval battle that took place in the Bahía de las Ánimas of Cartagena between the last Spanish resistance and the republican army, military confrontation that sealed the independence of Colombia:

No era noche de luna la del 18 de junio de 1821; pero la pintoresca población de Arjona ostentaba la más pura serenidad en el cielo tachonado de estrellas, y en el alegre bullicio de las gaitas y cumbiambas con que festejaban los indígenas, al abrigo de las armas republicanas, la aproximación de la celebrada fiesta de San Juan...

— Almirante José Prudencio Padilla, p. 96

Translated as:

It was a night without the moon, that of June 18, 1821; but the picturesque town of Arjona showed the purest serenity in the starry sky, and the cheerful bustle of gaitas and cumbiambas with which the indigenous people celebrated, sheltered from the republican arms, the approach of the festival of St. John...

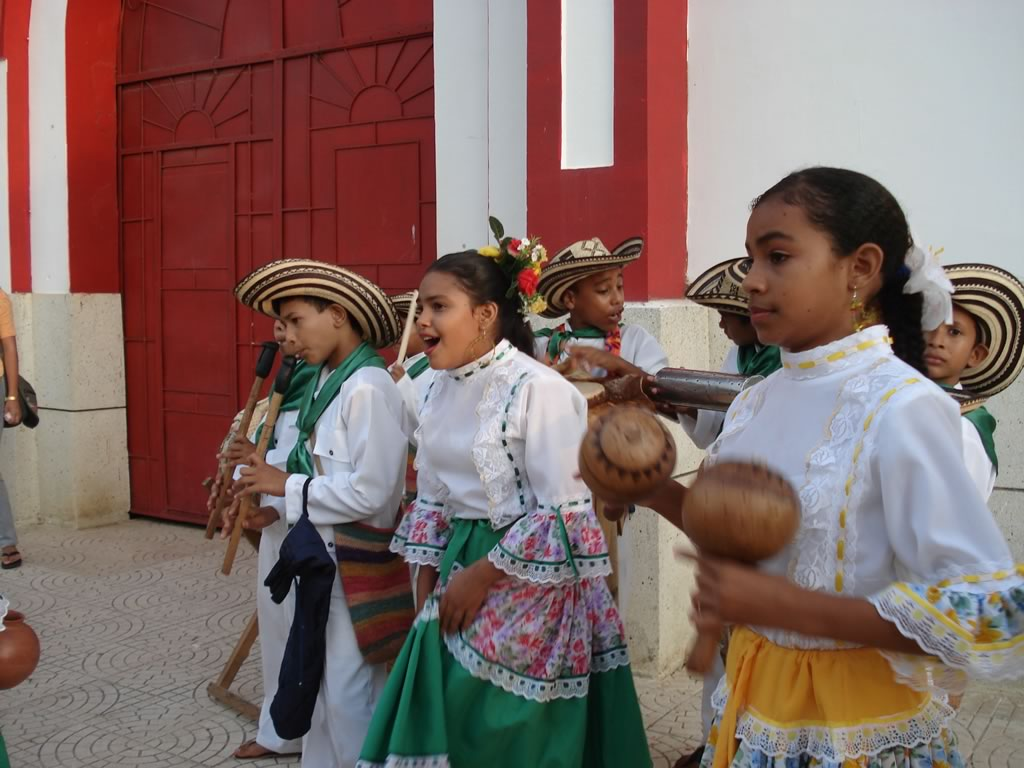
Children playing cumbia instruments. Notice the gaita, maracas, instruments mentioned by Gosselman in his historical record.

The musician and pedagogue Luis Antonio Escobar, in the chapter "La mezcla de indio y negro" (The mixture of Indian and black) of his book "Música en Cartagena de Indias" (Music in Cartagena de Indias) takes the description of Indian dance who witnessed the navy lieutenant Swedish Carl August Gosselman in Santa Marta, and recorded in his work "Viaje por Colombia: 1825 y 1826" (Journey through Colombia: 1825 and 1826) as proof that at least in the second decade of the nineteenth century the gaita ensemble existed already in Santa Marta, the same that appears in Cartagena and other coastal cities with black musical elements that resulted in cumbia:

Por la tarde del segundo día se preparaba gran baile indígena en el pueblo. La pista era la calle, limitada por un estrecho círculo de espectadores que rodeaba a la orquesta y los bailarines.

La orquesta es realmente nativa y consiste en un tipo que toca un clarinete de bambú de unos cuatro pies de largo, semejante a una gaita, con cinco huecos, por donde escapa el sonido; otro que toca un instrumento parecido, provisto de cuatro huecos, para los que solo usa la mano derecha, pues en la izquierda tiene una calabaza pequeña llena de piedrecillas, o sea una maraca, con la que marca el ritmo. Este último se señala aún más con un tambor grande hecho en un tronco ahuecado con fuego, encima del cual tiene un cuero estirado, donde el tercer virtuoso golpea con el lado plano de sus dedos.

A los sonidos constantes y monótonos que he descrito se unen los observadores, quienes con sus cantos y palmoteos forman uno de los coros más horribles que se puedan escuchar. En seguida todos se emparejan y comienzan el baile.

Este era una imitación del fandango español, aunque daba la impresión de asemejarse más a una parodia. Tenía todo lo sensual de él pero sin nada de los hermosos pasos y movimientos de la danza española, que la hacen tan famosa y popular.

— Carl August Gosselman (1801–1843), Viaje por Colombia: 1825 y 1826

Translated as:

In the afternoon of the second day they were preparing a large indigenous dance in the village. The dance floor was the street, bounded by a narrow circle of spectators surrounding the orchestra and dancers.

The orchestra is really native and consists of a guy who plays a bamboo clarinet about four feet long, like a gaita, with five holes, through which escapes the sound; another that plays a similar instrument, with four holes, for which he only uses his right hand because the left has a small pumpkin full of pebbles, a maraca, that sets the pace. The rhythm is marked even more with a large drum made in a fire-hollowed trunk, on top of which there is a stretched hide, where the third virtuoso hits the flat side of his fingers.

To the constant and monotonous sounds that I have described already join the observers, who with their singing and clapping form one of the most horrible choirs that can be heard. Then all pair up and start dancing.

This was an imitation of Spanish fandango, although it seemed to be more like a parody. It had every sensual detail from the Spanish dance but without any of its beautiful steps and movements, that make it so famous and popular.

In the description of the writer José María Samper during his trip down the Magdalena River in 1879, the constituent elements of dance and music on the Magdalena River, instruments and elements of dance cumbia are identified:

"Había un ancho espacio, perfectamente limpio, rodeado de barracas, barbacoas de secar pescado, altos cocoteros y arbustos diferentes. En el centro había una grande hoguera alimentada con palmas secas, alrededor de la cual se agitaba la rueda de danzantes, y otra de espectadores, danzantes á su turno, mucho más numerosa, cerraba á ocho metros de distancia el gran círculo. Allí se confundian hombres y mujeres, viejos y muchachos, y en un punto de esa segunda rueda se encontraba la tremenda orquesta... Ocho parejas bailaban al compás del son ruidoso, monótono, incesante, de la gaita (pequeña flauta de sonidos muy agudos y con solo siete agujeros) y del tamboril, instrumento cónico, semejante á un pan de azúcar, muy estrecho, que produce un ruido profundo como el eco de un cerro y se toca con las manos á fuerza de redobles continuos. La carraca (caña de chonta, acanalada trasversalmente, y cuyo ruido se produce frotándola á compás con un pequeño hueso delgado); el triángulo de fierro, que es conocido, y el chucho ó alfandoque (caña cilíndrica y hueca, dentro de la cual se agitan multitud de pepas que, a los sacudones del artista, producen un ruido sordo y áspero como el del hervor de una cascada), se mezclaban rarísimamente al concierto. Esos instrumentos eran más bien de lujo, porque el currulao de raza pura no reconoce sino la gaita, el tamboril y la curruspa. Las ocho parejas, formadas como escuadrón en columna, iban dando la vuelta á la hoguera, cogidos de una mano, hombre y mujer, sin sombrero, llevando cada cual dos velas encendidas en la otra mano, y siguiendo todos el compás con los piés, los brazos y todo el cuerpo, con movimientos de una voluptuosidad...

Translated as:

There was a wide space, perfectly clean, surrounded by barracks, barbecues used to dry fish, tall coconut trees and various bushes. In the center there was a large bonfire fed with dry palms, around it the circle of dancers hopped, and another circle of spectators, dancers at their own turns, much larger, close to eight meters away closing the greater circle. There, men and women, old and young were confused, and at one point of that second circle was the tremendous orchestra... Eight couples danced to the beat of that loud, monotonous, incessant son of the gaita (a small flute of very high pitch and with only seven holes) and the tamboril, conical instrument like a sugar loaf, very narrow, that produces a deep sound like the echo of a hill and is played with bare hands by continuous drumbeats. The carraca (a chonta reed, corrugated transversely and whose noise is produced by rubbing a small thin bone); the triangle of iron, which is known, and the chucho or alfandoque (cylindrical and hollow reed, filled with beads that are shaken by the jolts of the artist, it produces a dull and rough sound similar to the dash of a waterfall), they were oddly mixed in the concert. Those instruments were rather fancy, because the pure currulao knows nothing more than the gaita, the tamboril and the curruspa. The eight couples, formed as squadron in column, were turning around the bonfire, hand in hand, man and woman, hatless, carrying two burning candles each on the other hand, and following all the rhythm with their feet, arms and whole body, with movements of a voluptuousness...

In his work Lecturas locales (Local Readings) (1953), the barranquillero historian Miguel Goenaga barranquillero describes the cumbia and its cumbiamba circles in Barranquilla around 1888:

"El poeta y escritor Julio N. Galofre le cantó a la Cumbiamba; y al repasar yo esos cuartetos, que se publicarán alguna vez, me vienen a la memoria recuerdos de la niñez, cuando la popular mujer barranquillera, llamada La Cañón, ponía sus grandes ruedas de cumbiamba, allá por el año 1888, en las 4 esquinas de la calle Bolívar, callejón de California (hoy 20 de Julio), a donde concurría mucho público a ver la voluptuosidad del baile y el ritmo hondo y vigoroso de tambores, flautas y guarachas... Esto sí es cosa de la vieja Barranquilla, como resuena también en mis oídos el comienzo de un canto popular, cuando un señor Carrasquilla tenía en competencia otra cumbia por el barrio arriba, como entonces llamaban la parte sur de la ciudad:
Corre, corre, que te tumba la Cañón.

— Miguel Goenaga, Lecturas locales (1953), p. 396

Translated as:

"The poet and writer Julio N. Galofre sang to the Cumbiamba; and on reviewing those quartets, to be published sometime, memories of my childhood come to mind, when the popular woman from Barranquilla, called La Cañón, created her huge cumbiamba circles back in 1888, at the 4 corners of Bolivar street, California alley (today 20 de Julio). A large audience attended to see the voluptuousness of the dance and deep and vigorous rhythm of drums, flutes and guarachas... This really is a thing of the old Barranquilla, like how the beginning of a popular song resounds in my ears, when a Mr. Carrasquilla had another competing cumbia in the Arriba neighborhood, as they then called that part of the city:
Run, run, get knocked down by La Cañón.

== Instruments ==
The original instruments used for the Cumbia were groups of “gaitas and the ones of flauta de millo”. There are also many drums and other wind-like instruments that were used to create this music in the old days. To fill in the background of the music nowadays the musicians use “electric bass, trumpets, congas, and the accordion” as well as other instruments native to the region. This is an important aspect of Cumbia because it helps understand why the Indigenous and Afro-Colombians are both inventors of Cumbia. These instruments are also a big part of the Cumbia as they are what originally built the rhythm and styling pattern of the traditional music.

== Origin ==
The origin of cumbia has been the subject of argument between those who attribute an indigenous ethno-musical origin, geographically located in the Depresión Momposina Province and those who argue the thesis of origin black African in Cartagena or even in Africa itself. The first, represented by personalities like the composer José Barros, writers like Jocé G. Daniels, sociologists like Orlando Fals Borda and historians as Gnecco Rangel Pava, and the latter by the folklorist Delia Zapata Olivella.

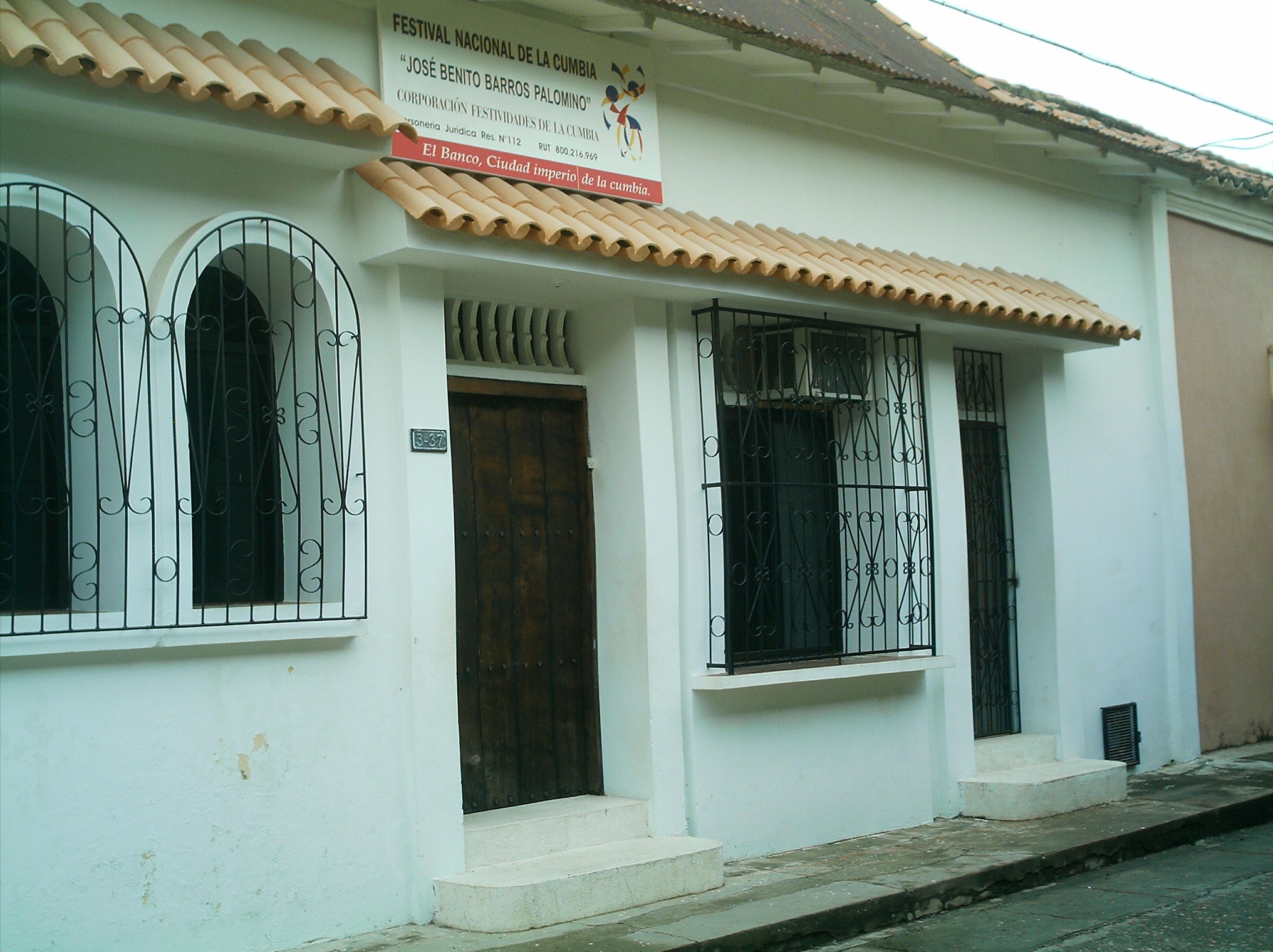
House of the composer José Barros at El Banco, Magdalena

In 1998, in his article "La cumbia, emperadora del Pocabuy" (La cumbia, Empress of Pocabuy) the writer Jocé G. Daniels theorizes that the cumbia was "el aliciente espiritual de los indios" (the spiritual attraction of the Indians) to associate the flutes used in the celebrations of the Chimilas, pocigueycas and pocabuyes in the territories of the current populations of Guamal, Ciénaga and El Banco, with the primitive cumbia gaita, based on the report sent by the perpetual governor Lope de Orozco to the king in 1580, about the Province of Santa Marta, which recounts that "los yndios i yndias veben y asen fiestas con una caña a manera de flauta que se meten en la boca para tañer y producen una mucica como mui trayda del infierno" (The Indians drink and party with a cane that is used as a flute, which they put in their mouths to be played and that produces a music that seems to come from the very hell) (sic).

The banqueño songwriter Antonio Garcia presented in 1997 the following theory about the birth of cumbia: "Las tribus dedicadas a la pesca y la agricultura, en sus rituales fúnebres, especialmente cuando moría algún miembro de la alta jerarquía de la tribu, todos los miembros se reunían al caer la noche alrededor de una fogata, en el centro del círculo se colocaba a una mujer embarazada que era símbolo de la nueva vida, quien iniciaba una danza con el ritmo suave y melancólico de la flauta de millo, esta ceremonia se prolongaba por varias horas y terminaba por sumir en el más grande éxtasis a todos los que estaban allí reunidos y así nació la cumbia" (The tribes engaged in fishing and agriculture, in their funeral rituals, especially when someone in the hierarchy of the tribe died, gathered all members at nightfall around a campfire in the center of the circle stood a pregnant woman who was a symbol of new life, who started a dance with the soft and melancholic rhythm from flute of millo, this ceremony was prolonged for several hours and ended up plunging into the greatest ecstasy to all who were gathered there and cumbia was born). At the same meeting, José Barros said, product of the oral tradition received from the Indians: "The cumbia was born in funeral ceremonies that Chimillas Indians celebrated in the country of Pocabuy when one of its leaders died" (La cumbia nació en las ceremonias fúnebres que los indios Chimillas celebraban en el país de Pocabuy cuando moría uno de sus jerarcas). Barros also holds in relation to dance: "The idea of dancing in a circular motion has to do with the custom of the Chimilas Indians who danced around the coffin of one of their leaders, what they did counter-clockwise, what meant one-way trip). Daniels adds that the musical airs related to the origin of the cumbia "had their peak between Chymilas, Pocigueycas (Ponqueycas) and Pocabuyes, i.e., in the actual populations of Guamal, Cienaga and El Banco. Cumbia reached its development with the elements provided by Bemba colorá blacks and whites, cunning and canny.".

To researchers of indigenous cultures, the ethno-musical mixture that gives rise to the cumbia occurs during the Colony in the native country of Pocabuy (current populations of El Banco, Guamal, Menchiquejo and San Sebastian in the Magdalena, Chiriguaná and Tamalameque in the Cesar and Mompox, Chilloa, Chimi and Guataca in Bolívar Department) located in the current Caribbean region of Colombia, in the upper valley of Magdalena region the Mompox Depression (including the cultures of La Sabana (Sucre), La Sabana and the Sinú River, north to Pincoya), product of the musical and cultural fusion of Indigenous, Afro-Colombian slaves and, on a lesser extent, of Spaniards, as referred by it historians Orlando Fals Borda in his book Mompox y Loba, and Gnecco Rangel Pava in his books El País de Pocabuy and Aires Guamalenses. The Pocabuy are mentioned in several recordings, although the most famous mention corresponds to the chorus of the song "Cumbia de la paz" (Cumbia of peace) recorded by "Chico" Cervantes:

Ritual sublime de los Pocabuy,
en la rueda de la cumbia
se despedían de los bravos guerreros
que allí morían,
que allí morían
en la paz de la cumbia...

translated as:

Sublime rite of the Pocabuy people,
at the cumbia circle
they gave farewells to brave warriors
who died there,
who died there
in the peace of cumbia...

Fals Borda notes:

La cumbia nació en el país de Pocabuy conformado por El Banco, Chiriguaná, Mompox, Tamalameque, Guamal y Chimí. Pocabuy era un país indígena que se extendía a todo lo largo del río Tucurinca (actual Magdalena).

translated as:

The cumbia was born in the country of Pocabuy formed by El Banco, Chiriguaná, Mompox, Tamalameque, Guamal and Chimi. Pocabuy was an indigenous country that extended throughout the Tucurinca river (current Magdalena).

For the writer Jocé G. Daniels, is "ironic" that people have "tried to foist a Kumbé Bantú origin to cumbia." Researchers question that if the cumbia came from African rhythms, in other parts of America where blacks came from all over Africa as slaves, as the United States, there should be cumbia, or at least something similar. J. Barros says, "cumbia does not have a single hint of Africa. That's easy to check: the United States, which received so many thousands of black Africans does not have anything like cumbia in its folkloric manifestations. The same happens with the Antillean countries. I wonder why if the cumbia is African and entered through La Boquilla, like Manuel and Delia Zapata Olivella Dsay, in Puerto Tejada, for example, where there are also black people, and throughout the Pacific, cumbia is not a rhythm or appears in compositions ... I, who have been in contact with Pocabuyanos Indians since I was eight, who have had the opportunity since I was a child to interact with indigenous wome of 80 to 90 years telling her ritual, the cumbia ritual, I can certify the above, that the cumbia appeared every time the cacique died and they danced around the dead."

In turn, the Africanists place the emergence of the cumbia to contact the black slaves with Indians in ports like Cartagena, Ciénaga, Santa Marta and Riohacha, mainly in the first, during the celebrations of the Virgen de la Candelaria. The Afro-Colombianists dispute the origin of cumbia, and the place it Cartagena.

Some authors assume that the black element in cumbia comes from cumbé, a bantu rhythm and dance from Bioko island Bioko, Equatorial Guinea. The Africans who arrived as slaves to those regions, to tell the story of their ethnic groups and those famous deeds worthy to be stored in memory, used certain songs that they called areítos, which means "dance singing": putting up candles, they sang the coreo which was like the historical lesson that, after being heard and repeated many times, remained in the memory of all listeners. The center of the circle was occupied by those who gave the lesson singing and those more proficient in handling guacharacas, millos, drums and maracas, to sing with delicacy the music of those songs that suffer a transformation, with time, from being elegiac to exciting, gallant, complainant and amusing.

The cultural researcher A. Stevenson Samper refers to the work of General Joaquin Posada Gutierrez, "Fiestas de la Candelaria in La Popa" (1865), where the music and dance of the festivities of the Virgen de la Candelaria described in Cartagena and relates the following description with cumbia circle. The anthropologist Nina S. de Friedemann uses the same text to explain the configuration of cumbia within the scope of slavery in Cartagena de Indias:

Para la gente pobre, libre y esclavos, pardos, negros, labradores, carboneros, carreteros, pescadores, etc., de pie descalzo, no había salón de baile... Ellos, prefiriendo la libertad natural de su clase, bailaban a cielo descubierto al son del atronador tambor africano, que se toca, esto es, que se golpea, con las manos sobre el parche, hombres y mujeres, en gran rueda, pareados, pero sueltos, sin darse las manos, dando vueltas alrededor de los tamborileros; las mujeres, enflorada la cabeza con profusión, lustroso el pelo a fuerza de sebo, y empapadas en agua de azahar, acompañaban a su galán en la rueda, balanceándose en cadencia muy erguidas, mientras el hombre, ya haciendo piruetas, o dando brincos, ya luciendo su destreza en la cabriola, todo al compás, procuraba caer en gracia a la melindrosa negrita o zambita, su pareja... Era lujo y galantería en el bailarín dar a su pareja dos tres velas de sebo, y un pañuelo de rabo de gallo o de muselina de guardilla para cogerlas,... Los indios también tomaban parte en la fiesta bailando al son de sus gaitas, especie de flauta a manera de zampoña. En la gaita de los indios, a diferencia del currulao de los negros, los hombres y mujeres de dos en dos se daban las manos en rueda, teniendo a los gaiteros en el centro, y ya se enfrentaban las parejas, ya se soltaban, ya volvían a asirse golpeando a compás el suelo con los pies, balanceándose en cadencia y en silencio sin brincos ni cabriolas y sin el bullicioso canto africano, notándose hasta en el baile la diferencia de las dos razas... Estos bailes se conservan todavía aunque con algunas variaciones. El currulao de los negros, que ahora llaman mapalé, fraterniza con la gaita de los indios; las dos castas, menos antagonistas ya, se reúnen frecuentemente para bailar confundidas, acompañando los gaiteros a los tamborileros... Antes, estos bailes no se usaban sino en las fiestas de alguna de las advocaciones de la Virgen, y en la del santo patrono de cada pueblo, sólo en su pueblo; en la del carnaval y en alguna que otra notable. Ahora no hay en las provincias de la costa, arrabal de ciudad, ni villa, ni aldea, ni caserío donde no empiece la zambra desde las siete de la noche del sábado y dure hasta el amanecer del lunes...

That can be translated as

For poor people, free and slave, browns, blacks, farmers, coal miners, carters, fishermen, etc., standing barefoot, there was no ballroom... They preferred the natural freedom of their kind, danced under the open sky to the sound of thunderous African drum, played hitting the patch with the hands, men and women, formed a big wheel and danced in couples, but loose, without shaking hands, circling around the drummers; women, with flowers in their head, lustrous hair dint of sebum, and soaked in orange blossom water, accompanied her beau on the circle, swaying in very erect cadence, while the man, pirouetting, or prancing, and showing his skills, all the time, tried to ingratiate his zambita, his partner... It was gallantry in the dancer to give his partner two or three tallow candles, and a scarf to grab them ... the Indians also took part in the party dancing to their gaitas, a sort of flute. In the Indian gaitas, unlike the currulao of blacks, men and women held hand together in the circle, having the gaita players in the center, and couples faced, and were released, and they returned to hold hand hitting the ground with their feet, swaying in cadence and in silence without jumps or without the African singing, being noticed he difference of the two races even in the dancing ... These dances are preserved today with some variations. Currulao of blacks, who now called mapalé, fraternize with the gaitas of the Indians; the two castes, less antagonistic now, meet frequently to dance, accompanying the drummers and gaita players ... Before, these dances were just used at parties of Hail Mary, and the patron saint of each town, just in that town; in the carnival and some other remarkable parties. Now there is in the coastal provinces, city suburb or town, or village, or township were the party has not started at seven of Saturday and last until the dawn of Monday ...

At least until the 1920s, the terms cumbia and mapalé designated the same rhythm in the area of Cartagena de Indias:

En 1921, el presidente del Concejo Municipal Simón Bossa expide el Acuerdo No 12 en el que «queda prohibido en la ciudad y en los corregimientos del Pie de la Popa, Manga, Espinal, Cabrero, Pekín, Quinta y Amador, el baile conocido con el nombre de cumbia o mapalé…

translated as

In 1921, City Council President Simon Bossa issued the Agreement No. 12 in which "is prohibited in the city and in the districts of Pie de la Popa, Manga, Espinal, Cabrero, Pekín, Quinta and Amador, the dance known by the name of cumbia or mapalé ... "

Regarding the cantares de vaquería (cowboy songs) as one of the origins of vallenato, the cultural and musical researcher Ciro Quiroz states about cumbia:

...Era otra más de las formas musicales nacidas del trabajo colectivo, como aquella de los bogas que en la actividad de la navegación fue la raíz de la cumbia o aquella otra de los 'socoladores', llamada 'zafra' en algunos lugares, y que murió al agotarse la fuente matriz inspiradora,...

that is loosely translated as

... It was another of those musical forms born from collective work, like the one of the oarsmen that in the navigation activity was the root of cumbia or the r of the 'socoladores' (people who cleared a zone of trees), called 'zafra' in some places, and that died after exhausting the sources, ...

Referring to the site of origin of vallenato, Quiroz notes on the site of origin of cumbia:

Mompox y su zona de influencia, como parte del Magdalena Grande, debe ser incluido también dentro del territorio donde nació el vallenato, con cunas discutibles como Plato, Valledupar, Riohacha, El Paso y la Zona Bananera. Además de que, indiscutiblemente, es la zona de origen de la cumbia, nacida en la región de la ciénaga de Zapatosa bajo su antigua jurisdicción.

translated as

Mompox and its area of influence, as part of the Magdalena Grande should also be included within the territory where the vallenato was born, with disputable cradles as Plato, Valledupar, Riohacha, El Paso and the Zona Bananera. Besides, undoubtedly, it is the area of origin of the cumbia, born in the region of the ciénaga de Zapatosa' under its former jurisdiction.

On the transition of whistles and flutes to the current vallenato instruments, the author says:

...Esta primera transición instrumental es difícil de precisar en el tiempo, pero se percibe claramente todavía hacia finales del siglo XIX, cuando sones, puyas y tamboras se escuchaban a orillas de los ríos en flautas y en pitos cruzados con el nombre genérico de cumbia.

Translated as

... This first instrumental transition is difficult to pinpoint in time, but still clearly perceived in the late nineteenth century, when sones, puyas and drums were heard on the banks of the rivers crossed flutes and whistles with the generic name cumbia.

On April 16, 1877 La Cumbia Soledeña was founded, one of the most distinguished and traditional cumbia groups.

== Colombian tradition ==
By the 1940s cumbia began spreading from the coast to other parts of Colombia alongside other costeña form of music, like porro and vallenato. This was because these genres were restyled by cosmopolitan orchestras and transformed into música tropical. Clarinetist Lucho Bermúdez helped bring cumbia into the country's interior by adding stylized orchestral arrangements to the rhythms of the genre. In other parts of Latin America orchestrated cumbia became popularized as música tropical. The early spread of cumbia internationally was helped by the number of record companies on the coast. Originally working-class populist music, cumbia was frowned upon by the elites. The implementation of stylized orchestras made it more acceptable and appealing to the elites and as it spread the class association subsided and cumbia became popular in every sector of society. The researcher Guillermo Abadía Morales in his "Compendium of Colombian folklore", Volume 3, # 7, published in 1962, states that "this explains the origin in the zambo conjugation of musical air by the fusion of the melancholy indigenous gaita flute or caña de millo, i.e., Tolo or Kuisí, of Guna or Kogi ethnic groups, respectively, and the cheerful and impetuous resonance from the African drums. The ethnographic council has been symbolized in the different dancing roles that correspond to each sex." The presence of these cultural elements can be appreciated thus:

- In instrumentation are the drums; maracas, guache and the whistles (caña de millo and gaitas) of indigenous origin; whereas the songs and coplas are a contribution of Spanish poetics, although adapted later.
- Presence of sensual movements, distinctly charming, seductive, characteristic of dances with African origins.
- The vestments have clear Spanish features: long polleras, lace, sequins, hoop earrings, flower headdresses and intense makeup for women; white shirt and pants, knotted red shawl around the neck and hat reckless

=== Festivals and heritage ===
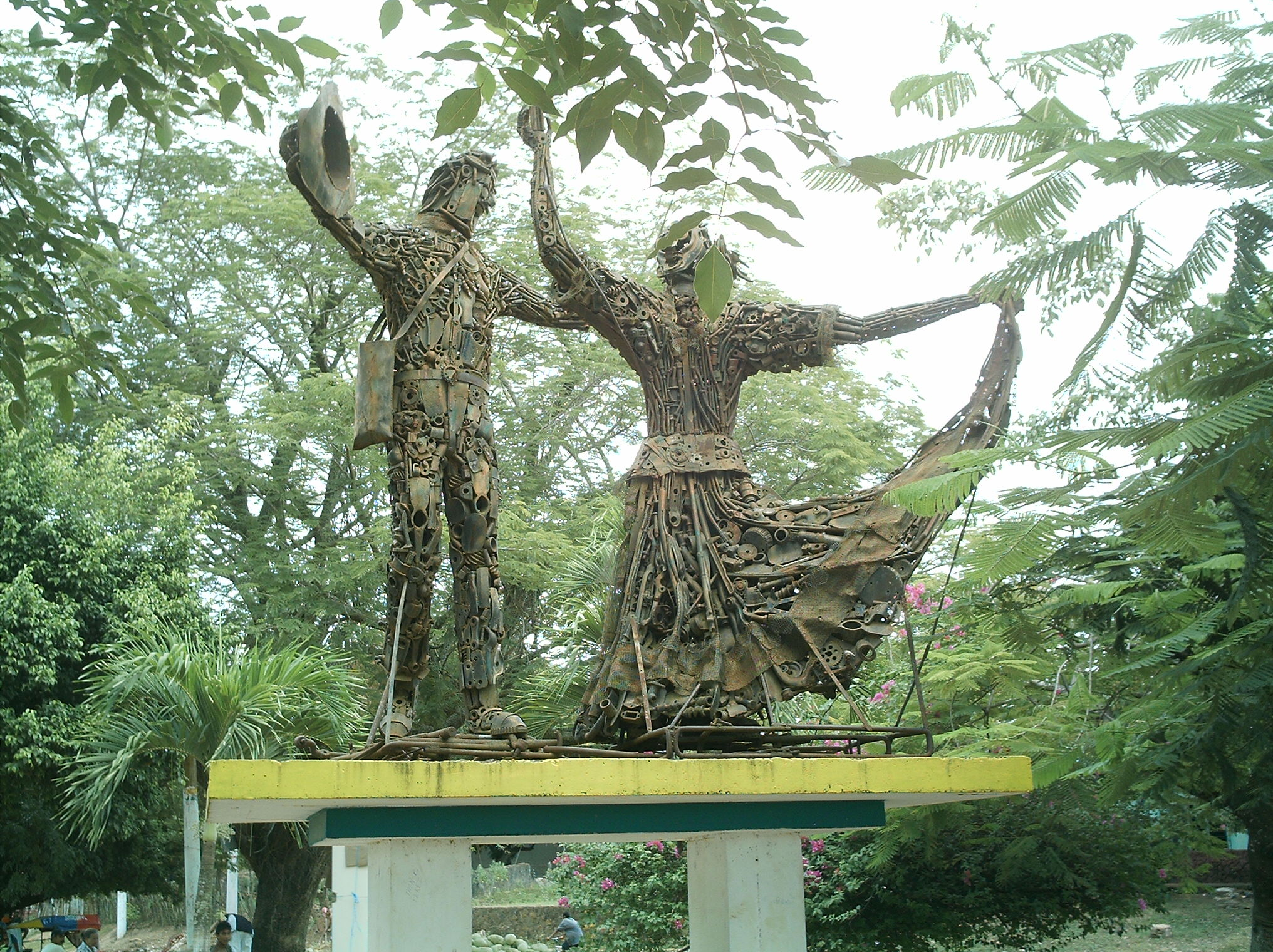
Monument to the cumbia in El Banco, Magdalena

The most relevant cumbia festivals are:

- Festival Nacional de la Cumbia "José Barros", which is celebrated yearly in El Banco, Magdalena. It was declared a cultural heritage of the nation by the Congress of Colombia in 2013.
- Festival Nacional de la Cumbiamba: that is celebrated yearly in Cereté, Córdoba.
- Sirenato de la Cumbia: celebrated yearly in Puerto Colombia, Atlántico.
- Festival de Cumbia Autóctona del Caribe Colombiano: celebrated yearly in Barranquilla.
- Festival de Bailadores de Cumbia: celebrated yearly in Barranquilla.

The carnaval de Barranquilla is the scenario of multiple cumbia performances and contests; the main stage of the parades, Vía 40 Avenue, is called the "cumbiódromo" during the days of carnival, in analogy to the Sambadrome in Rio de Janeiro and other Brazilian cities. In 2006, the cumbia was nominated by the magazine Semana and the Ministry of Culture as a cultural symbol of Colombia, being in the position twelve of fifty candidates.

In 2013 the Congress of Colombia declared the National Festival of the Cumbia Jose Barros of El Banco, Magdalena cultural heritage of the Nation.

Since 2013, the mayor of Guamal, Magdalena (municipality located in the territory of the former nation of Pocabuy), Alex Ricardo Rangel Arismendi, promotes the project to declare the cumbia as Intangible Cultural Heritage of the Nation Colombiana. Cumbia has been declared national heritage of Colombia in October 2022.

=== Modern cumbia in Colombia ===
Geographical coverage of Colombian cumbia

Cumbia is present on the Caribbean coast, in the subregion around the Magdalena River delta invested, the Montes de María and riverine populations, with its epicenter in the Depresión momposina seat of ancient Pocabuy Indigenous country.

Traditional cumbia is preserved and considered representative of the Colombian identity, especially on the northern Caribbean coast. The best representation of traditional Cumbia is shown every year on the Festival de la Cumbia in El Banco, Magdalena. The festival was created by one of the most important Colombian Cumbia composers, Jose Barros, in order to preserve the original rhythms of traditional Cumbia music. Modern forms of cumbia are also combined with other genres like vallenato, electronica or rock. This mixing of genres is found in the music of modern artists, such as Carlos Vives, Bomba Estéreo, Andrés Cabas.

Since the 1980s, in the city of Medellín, there has been growing interest among young and middle-aged people in "rescuing" the masterpieces of the '50s.

However, how Cumbia is seen and performed has already shifted from the way it was viewed and done traditionally. As a result of “correlajes”, Bogota saw Cumbia as a way to bring in Caribbean culture and place it in the “image of the country”. This changed the perspective of how Cumbia was seen by the elites as it became a part of heritage and culture. Another factor that was changed about traditional Cumbia is that Cumbia used to be “an exclusively instrumental genre”. However, as time passed, they started to add vocals to this music.

== Diffusion in Latin America ==
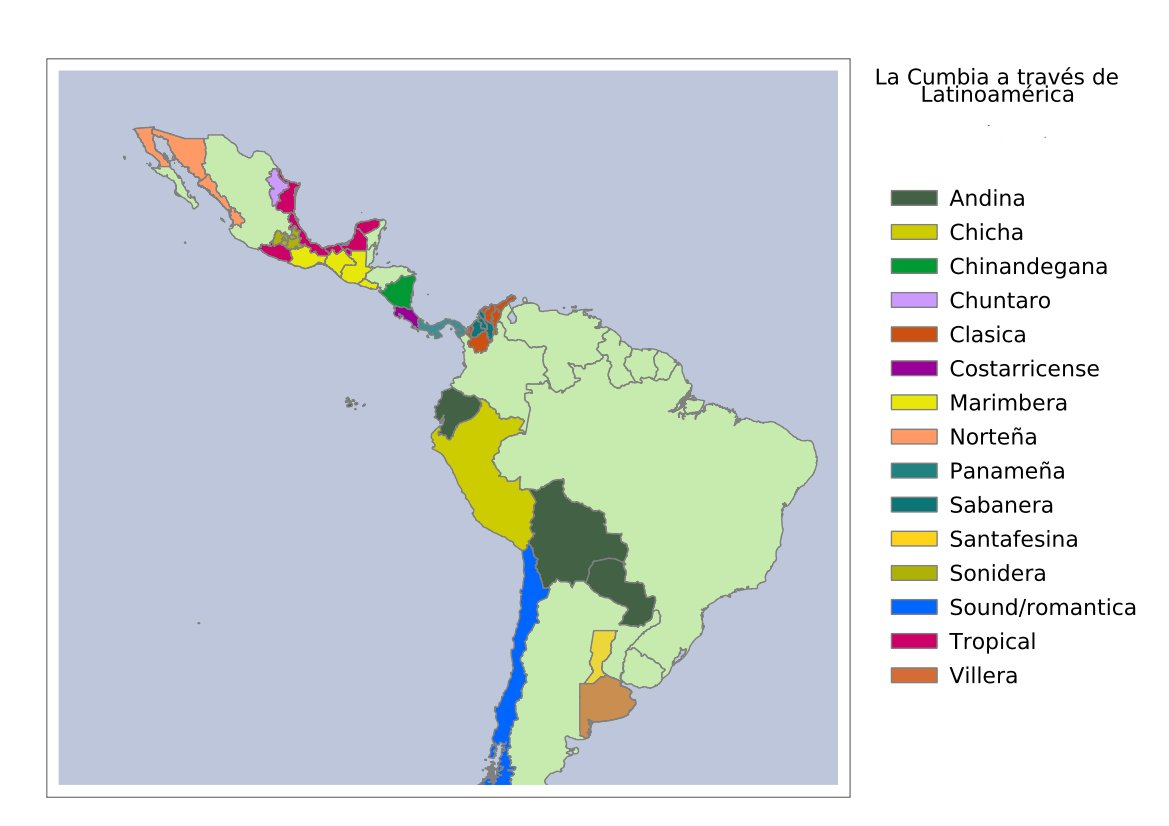
The diverse types of cumbia throughout Latin America

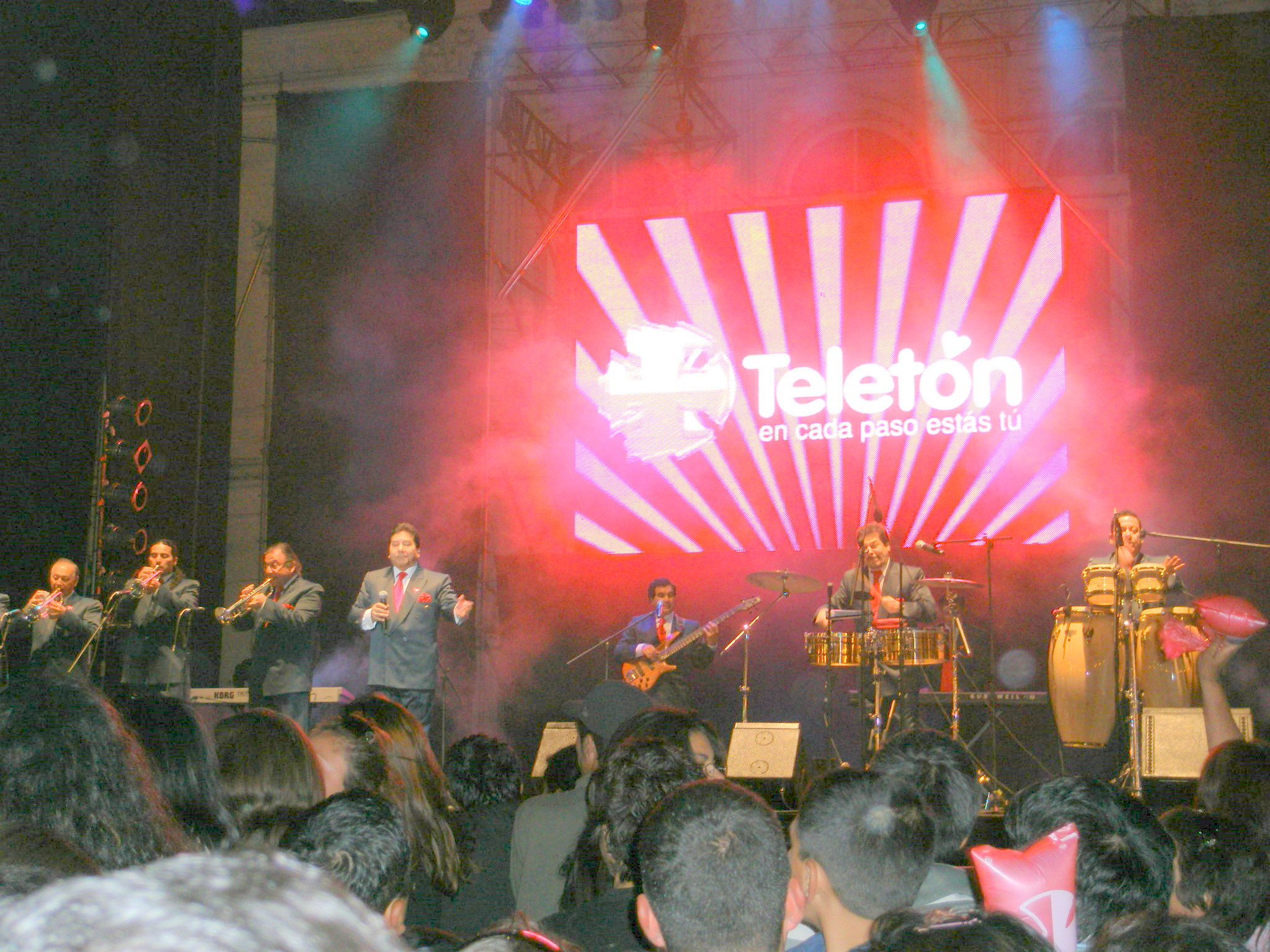
La Sonora de Tommy Rey, a Chilean cumbia band. The image shows the classic instrumentation of the international variants of the genre.

The 1960s was a very fruitful time in the Colombian music industry, beginning with the founding of Discos Fuentes in 1934, the Discos Sonolux in 1949 and soon after Discos Victoria. Since the 1940s, orchestras like Lucho Bermudez, Los Corraleros de Majagual, Los Hispanos or Los Graduados took the cumbia to Peru, where it became more known with groups such as Los Mirlos, Los Destellos, or Juaneco y Su Combo who were some of the first to give a proper rhythm to the Peruvian cumbia using as the main instrument electric guitars. Thanks to this it becomes much better known in Argentina, El Salvador, Mexico, Ecuador, Chile, Venezuela, among other. This led local musicians to give rise to variants of cumbia as a result of its fusion with rhythms of each nation such as Argentine cumbia, Mexican cumbia, Salvadoran cumbia, etc. However how Cumbia is seen and performed has already shifted from the way it was viewed and done traditionally. As a result of “correlajes”, Bogota saw Cumbia as a way to bring in Caribbean culture and place it in the “image of the country”. This changed the perspective of how Cumbia was seen by the elites as it became a part of heritage and culture. Another factor that was changed about traditional Cumbia is that Cumbia used to be “an exclusively instrumental genre” however as the time passed they started to add vocals to this music.

=== Argentina ===
Cumbia and porro rhythms were introduced by Lucho Bermudez, who in 1946 recorded for RCA Víctor in Argentina 60 of his compositions with musicians provided by Eduardo Armani and Eugene Nobile. In the early 1960s, Bovea y sus Vallenatos move to Argentina and popularizes cumbia in the country; the same was done by the Cuarteto Imperial, a Colombian band nationalized Argentine. The country has contributed musical compositions and own variations Cumbia villera, which resonates particularly with the poor and marginalized dwellers of villas miseria, (shanty towns, and slums); lyrics typically glorify theft and drug abuse. Undoubtedly the most refined version of Argentine cumbia is called Santa Fe cumbia or cumbia with guitar. In this style the main instrument is the guitar and its compositions are more complex. In the Santa Fe cumbia schemes of two or three simple chords and lyrics about dancing are abandoned, and melancholy lyrics and atypical chords are explored. Its creator, Juan Carlos Denis, is considered a hero of the local music. His creation became popular in 1978 with his album "A mi gente" and the band "Los del bohío".

Pablo Lescano, ex-member of Amar Azul and founder of Flor Piedra and Damas Gratis is known to be the creator of the cumbia villera "sound". However, a lighter form of cumbia enjoyed widespread popularity in Argentina during the 1990s. Antonio Rios (ex-Grupo Sombras, ex-Malagata) is a good representative of the Argentinian cumbia from the 1990s.

=== Bolivia ===
The cumbia sound from Bolivia usually incorporates Afro-Bolivian Saya beats and Mexican influenced tecnocumbia.

=== Cumbia marimbera (Central America) ===
In the south and southeast of Mexico (states of Chiapas and Oaxaca) is traditional the use of the modern marimba (Percussion instrument made of native wood from Guatemala) as this instrument was developed in the region, extending its use to much of Central America, particularly in Guatemala, El Salvador, Honduras and Nicaragua. Since the early 1940s, several Central American composers created music pieces using the rhythm of cumbia giving an original touch.

Among the main drivers of the cumbia are Nicaraguans Victor M. Leiva with "Cumbia piquetona", Jorge Isaac Carballo with "Baila mi cumbia", Jorge Paladino with "Cumbia Chinandega" and groups like Los Hermanos Cortés with "A bailar con Rosita", "Entre ritmos y palmeras" and "Suenan los tambores" and Los Alegres de Ticuantepe with "Catalina". In El Salvador, Los Hermanos Flores with "La cumbia folclórica", "Salvadoreñas" and "La bala". The Guatemalan orchestra "Marimba Orquesta Gallito" is the most famous between cumbia marimbera bands/orchestras. From Mexico, there are orchestras like "Marimba Chiapas" and "Marimba Soconusco".

=== Chile ===
In Chile, cumbia was also introduced by recordings made in Colombia. Chilean cumbia was born when Luisín Landáez, a Venezuelan singer, achieved success with songs like "Macondo" or "La Piragua" and when the Colombian Amparito Jiménez recorded in Chile "La pollera colorá", among other songs. Cumbia is one of the most popular dance forms in Chile. They have a style of their own, Chilean cumbia, and some of the most successful orchestras of this genre include Sonora Palacios, Viking 5, Giolito y su Combo, and La Sonora de Tommy Rey. However, Cumbia's popularity has been declining since the success of reggaeton in the mid-2000s, losing part of the preferences of the popular sectors of society.

Nowadays, Cumbia is gaining new attention as a result of emergence of acts formed by younger musicians usually labelled as "La Nueva Cumbia Chilena" (The new Chilean Cumbia), including bands such as Chico Trujillo, Banda Conmoción, Juana Fe, Sonora Barón, Sonora de Llegar, Chorizo Salvaje, Sonora Tomo como Rey, and Villa Cariño, among others. These new bands offer some of the classic tones and sounds of Chilean cumbia blended with rock or other folk Latin American styles. La Noche and Américo are also very popular acts, although they perform a more traditional style of Chilean cumbia, in some extend related to the style that dominated during the 1990s.

=== El Salvador ===
In El Salvador, Cumbia was performed by Orchestras such as Orchestra San Vicente, Los Hermanos Flores and Grupo Bravo.

=== Mexico ===
In the 1940s, the Colombian singer Luis Carlos Meyer emigrated to Mexico, where he worked with the Mexican orchestra director Rafael de Paz. Their album La Cumbia Cienaguera is considered the first cumbia recorded outside Colombia. Meyer Castandet also recorded other hits, including Mi gallo tuerto, Caprichito, and Nochebuena. Música tropical, particularly Colombian cumbia and porro began to become popular in Mexico combined with local sounds, with Tony Camargo creating the beginnings of Mexican cumbia. Later styles include the Technocumbia, tropical Cumbia, Cumbia grupera, Mexican Andean Cumbia, and Cumbia sonidera, which uses synthesizers and electric batteries.

In the 1970s, Aniceto Molina emigrated to Mexico, where he joined the Guerrero group La Luz Roja de San Marcos and recorded many popular tropical cumbias, such as La Cumbia Sampuesana, El Campanero, El Gallo Mojado, El Peluquero, and La Mariscada.

Other popular Mexican cumbia composers and performers include Fito Olivares, Los Angeles Azules, Los Caminantes, and Grupo Bronco(Bronco).

=== Nicaragua ===
Nicaragua became a stronghold of Cumbia music during the 1950s and 1960s. The country has its own variation of cumbia music and dance. Mostly known for its cumbia chinandegana in the Northwestern section of the country, it has also seen a rise in cumbia music artists on the Caribbean coast like Gustavo Layton.

=== Peru ===
Peru, like other American countries, was invaded by the first cumbia recordings made in Colombia from the north and from the capital. During the mid-1960s began to appear on national discography from various music labels like Virrey, MAG, and Iempsa, orchestras like Lucho Macedo and Pedro Miguel y sus Maracaibos. Since the early 60s', the Cumbia Peruana has had great exponents. While initially had strong influences from Colombian cumbia, over time it has achieved a unique and distinctive style with shades or rhythms influenced by rock, Huayno, native dances of the jungle, waltz, bolero, merengue, salsa, etc., we can say that it is continually changing or evolving. The rhythm was understood soon in all regions of the country, prompting some groups to introduce some Peruvian musical elements, making electric guitars protagonists. Contributions from Peru to the cumbia are interpretation, compositions and variations like Tropical andean cumbia; thanks to the contribution of Peruvian cumbia, this genre is known throughout South America.

Peruvian cumbia, particularly from the 1960s to mid-1990s, is generally known as "Chicha", although this definition is quite problematic as both Peruvian cumbia and Chicha currently co-exist and influence each other (good examples include Agua Marina's popular cover of Los Eco's "Paloma Ajena" and Grupo Nectar's cover of Guinda's "Cerveza, Ron y Guinda"). Peruvian cumbia started in the 1960s with groups such as Los Destellos, and later with Juaneco y Su Combo, Los Mirlos, Los Shapis, Cuarteto Continental, Los Diablos Rojos, Pintura Roja, Chacalon y la Nueva Crema and Grupo Néctar. Some musical groups that play Peruvian cumbia today are: Agua Marina, Armonia 10, Agua Bella, and Grupo 5. These groups would be classified as Cumbia but often take songs and techniques from Chicha and Huayno in their stylings or as songs. Grupo Fantasma was a Peruvian-Mexican cumbia group. Andean Cumbia, is a style that combines Andean music and cumbia. This style has even become popular in Mexico, as some groups like Grupo Saya claim to be Cumbia andina mexicana, Mexican Andean Cumbia.

=== Venezuela ===
Since the 1950s the cumbia has great success and impact in Venezuela due to its proximity to Colombia and to the emigration of Colombians. Two of the oldest Venezuelan tropical orchestras that begin to perform and record cumbia in the country were Los Melódicos and Billo's Caracas Boys. The most significant contributions have been creating Venezuelan cumbia styles using melodic organs and harps.

== Famous artists and groups ==
- Aniceto Molina
- Armando Hernandez
- Margarita Vargas
- Rodolfo y Su Tipica
- Rodolfo Aicardi
- Sonora Dinamita

== See also ==
- Baila music
- Cumbia
- Cumbia villera
- Music of Latin America
- New Chilean cumbia
- Ska
- Cha cha cha
- Latin Grammy Award for Best Cumbia/Vallenato Album
- Tamborito
- Totó la Momposina
- Tropical music
- La Pollera Colorá

== Bibliography ==
- Abadía, Guillermo. Compendio general del folclor colombiano. 1983 4a ed., rev. y acotada. 547 p.: ill.; 22 cm. Bogotá: Fondo de Promoción de la Cultura del Banco Popular. (3. ed en 1977).
- Davidson, Harry. Diccionario folclórico de Colombia. Tomo III. Banco de la República, Bogotá, 1970.
- Ocampo, Javier. Música y folclor de Colombia. Enciclopedia Popular Ilustrada, No. 5. Bogotá, Plaza y Janés. 2000. ISBN 958-14-0009-5.
- Revista Colombiana de Folclore. No. 7, Vol. III. Bogotá, 1962.
- Ballanoff, Paul A. Origen de la cumbia Breve estudio de la influencia intercultural en Colombia. América lndígena 31, no 1: 45-49. 1971.
- Zapata Olivella, Delia. La cumbia, síntesis musical de la Nación colombiana. Reseña histórica y coreográfica. Revista Colombiana de Folclor 3, no. 7:187-204. 1962
- Rangel Pava, Gnecco. Aires guamalenses. Kelly, 1948.
- Pombo Hernándes, Gerardo. Kumbia, legado cultural de los indígenas del Caribe colombiano. Editorial Antillas, 1995.
