= Barranquilla Carnival =

Colombian folklore festival

Coordinates: 10°57′50″N 74°47′47″W

Barranquilla Carnival Carnaval de Barranquilla
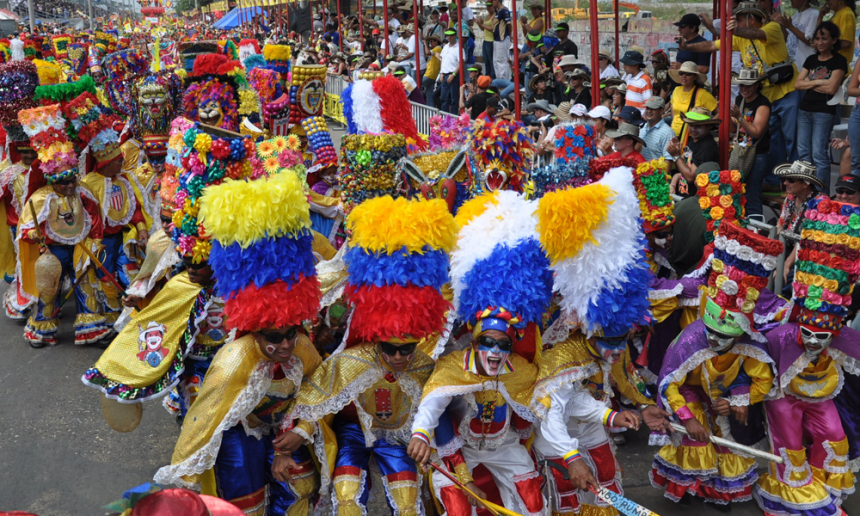
- Folkloric groups dancing at the carnival
- Official name: Carnaval de Barranquilla
- Observed by: Various locales, usually ones historically associated with Catholic populations.
- Type: Local, cultural, catholic
- Significance: Celebration prior to fasting season of Lent.
- Celebrations: Parades, parties, orchestras festival
- Date: Four days before Ash Wednesday
- 2025 date: March 1 – March 4
- 2026 date: February 14 – February 17
- 2027 date: February 6 – February 9
- 2028 date: February 26 – February 29
- Duration: 4 days
- Frequency: Annual
- Related to: Carnival SZ + ADP

Carnival of Barranquilla
- UNESCO Intangible Cultural Heritage
- Country: Colombia
- Reference: 00051
- Region: Latin America and the Caribbean

Inscription history
- Inscription: 2003 (3rd session)
- List: Representative

The Barranquilla Carnival (Spanish: Carnaval de Barranquilla) is one of Colombia's most important folkloric celebrations, and one of the biggest carnivals in the world. The carnival has traditions that date back to the 19th century. Four days before Lent, Barranquilla decks itself out to receive national and foreign tourists to join together with the city's inhabitants to enjoy four days of intense festivities. During the carnival, Barranquilla's normal activities are put aside as the city gets busy with street dances, musical and masquerade parades. The Carnival Of Barranquilla includes dances such as the Spanish paloteo, African Congo, and indigenous mice y mica's. Many styles of Colombian music are also performed, most prominently cumbia, and instruments include drums and wind ensembles. The Carnival of Barranquilla was proclaimed a Cultural Masterpiece of the Nation by Colombia's National Congress in 2002. Also the UNESCO, in Paris on November 7, 2003, declared it one of the Masterpieces of the Oral and Intangible Heritage of Humanity.

The Carnival starts on the Saturday before the Ash Wednesday with the Battle of the Flowers (La Batalla de Flores), which is considered one of the main activities. Then, The Great Parade (La Gran Parada) on Sunday and Monday is marked by an Orchestra Festival with Caribbean and Latin bands. Tuesday signals the end of the carnival, announced by the burial of Joselito Carnaval, who is mourned by everyone.

The slogan of the Barranquilla Carnival is: Those who live it are those who enjoy it (Quien lo vive, es quien lo goza).

== History ==
Very little is known about exactly how and why this carnival began. There are many theories; the most popular belief is that the carnival is the welcoming of spring and a celebration of birth and renewal. The carnival originates from a combination of pagan ceremonies, catholic beliefs and ethnic diversity and is a mixture of the European, African and Indian traditions, dances and music. It was at first a holiday for slaves, and grew to be a celebration of the region.

Local beliefs date it back seven centuries and it is known that a great deal of the traditions were brought to America by the Spanish and Portuguese. The first notable date in the Carnival's history is 1888, when a figure known as King Momo appeared in the documented history of the Carnival. In 1903, the first known battle of the flowers was recorded, apparently to recover a long lost carnival tradition and, fifteen years later, the first Barranquilla Carnival's queen was chosen to preside over the festivities of the carnival, which was later institutionalised in 1923. In the years that followed the carnival grew and so did the traditions, including the integration of the great parade.

=== Chronology ===
- 1888: King Momo emerged as one of the main characters.
- 1899: The first President of the Carnival and the first Board of directors were elected.
- 1903: The first Battle of Flowers parade (Spanish: Batalla de las Flores) (due to Heriberto Bengoechea's initiative in order to recover the carnival tradition of the previous years, as well as to celebrate the end of the One Thousand Days War ( Spanish: Guerra de los Mil Dias).)
- 1918: Alicia Lafaurie Roncallo elected as the first Carnival Queen.
- 1923: The Carnival was institutionalised, since the queen contest had been cancelled for the 5 previous years.
- 1967: The Great Parade event was introduced. It now takes place on the second day of the carnival, usually on Sundays.
- 1969: The Orchestra Festival was created, which is a musical competition ranging over various genres.
- 1974: The first Guacherna took place due to Esther Forero's initiative. The Guacherna is now celebrated on the previous week Friday before the carnival formally starts.
- 2002: The Carnival was declared as a National Culture Heritage by the Colombian Senate
- 2003: The Carnival was proclaimed by UNESCO on November 7, as one of the Masterpieces of the Oral and Intangible Heritage of Humanity.

== Pre-Carnivals ==
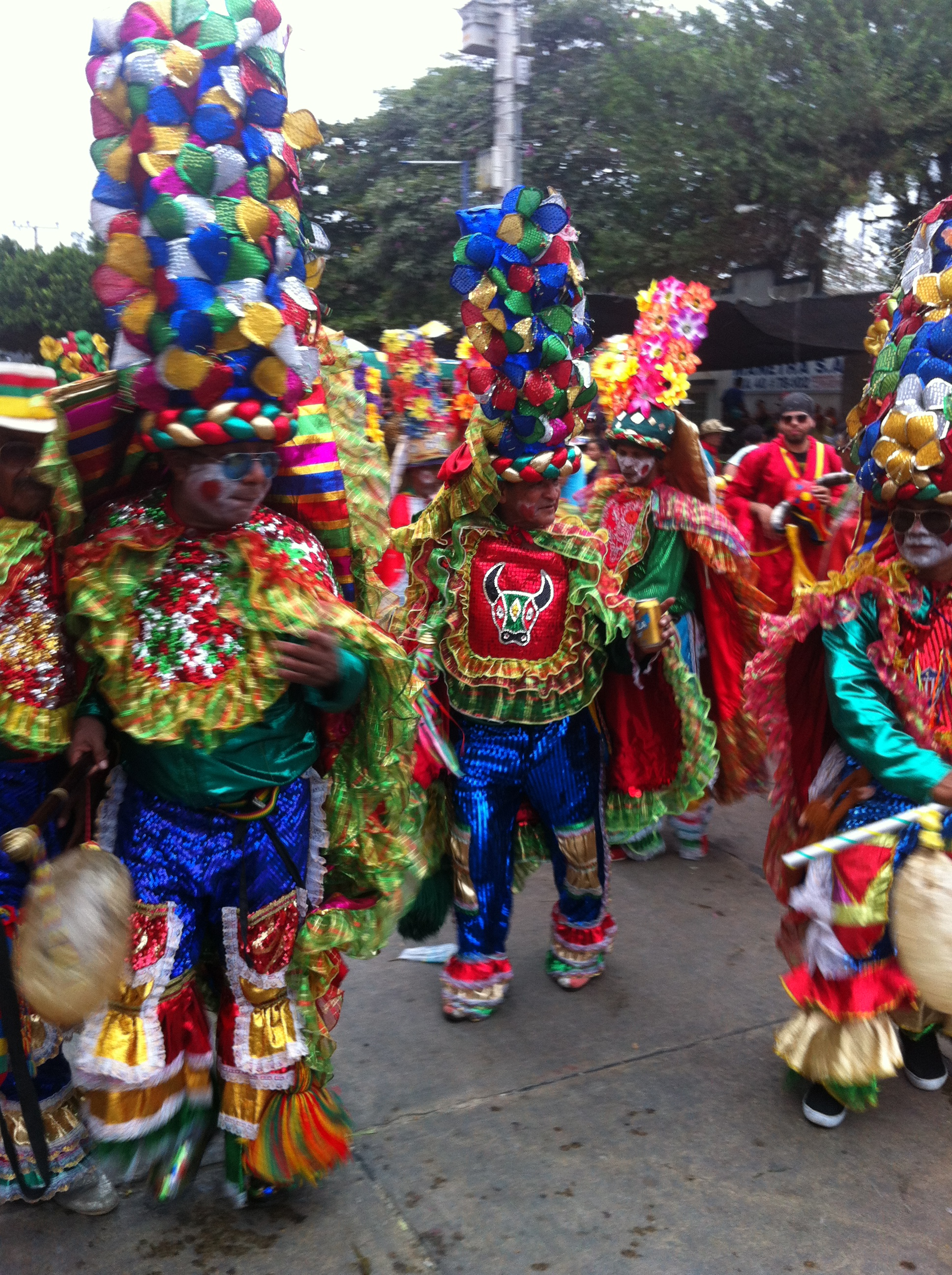
Congo dancing group.

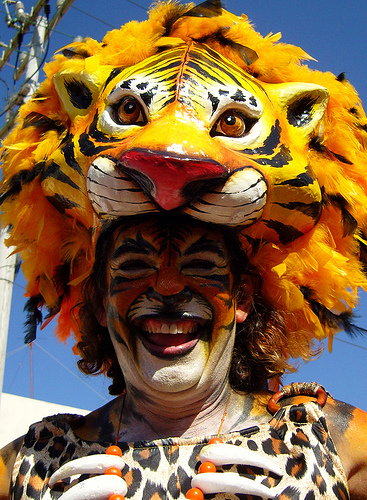
A costume.

The festivities, which are presided over by both the carnival queen and the Momo King elected the previous year, starts non-officially just after the New Year's Eve. The pre-carnival events begins officially with the Lectura del Bando (The reading of the Carnival Proclamation), followed by la toma de la ciudad (The taking Of the city), the crowning of the Carnival Queen and the Momo King, the children parade, the gay parade and finally La Guacherna, a nocturnal parade regarded as the most important pre-carnival event.

=== The Reading of the Carnival Proclamation ===
The reading of the Carnival Proclamation is one of the most important pre-Carnival events, because it officially marks the beginning of the pre-Carnivals. In this act, which takes place traditionally at La Paz Square, the current Barranquilla mayor symbolically grants the keys of the city to the carnival queen, hence "ceding" their power to her for as long as the carnival season lasts. This proclamation may be seen as a "decree" divided into paragraphs that explains what is permitted and what is forbidden for the attendants during the period of celebration. Each paragraph includes recent and gripping happenings of the city that incentivise the revelry. It is read publicly by the queen during a folkloric act accompanied by the Momo King, the children kings and displays of folkloric dance groups.

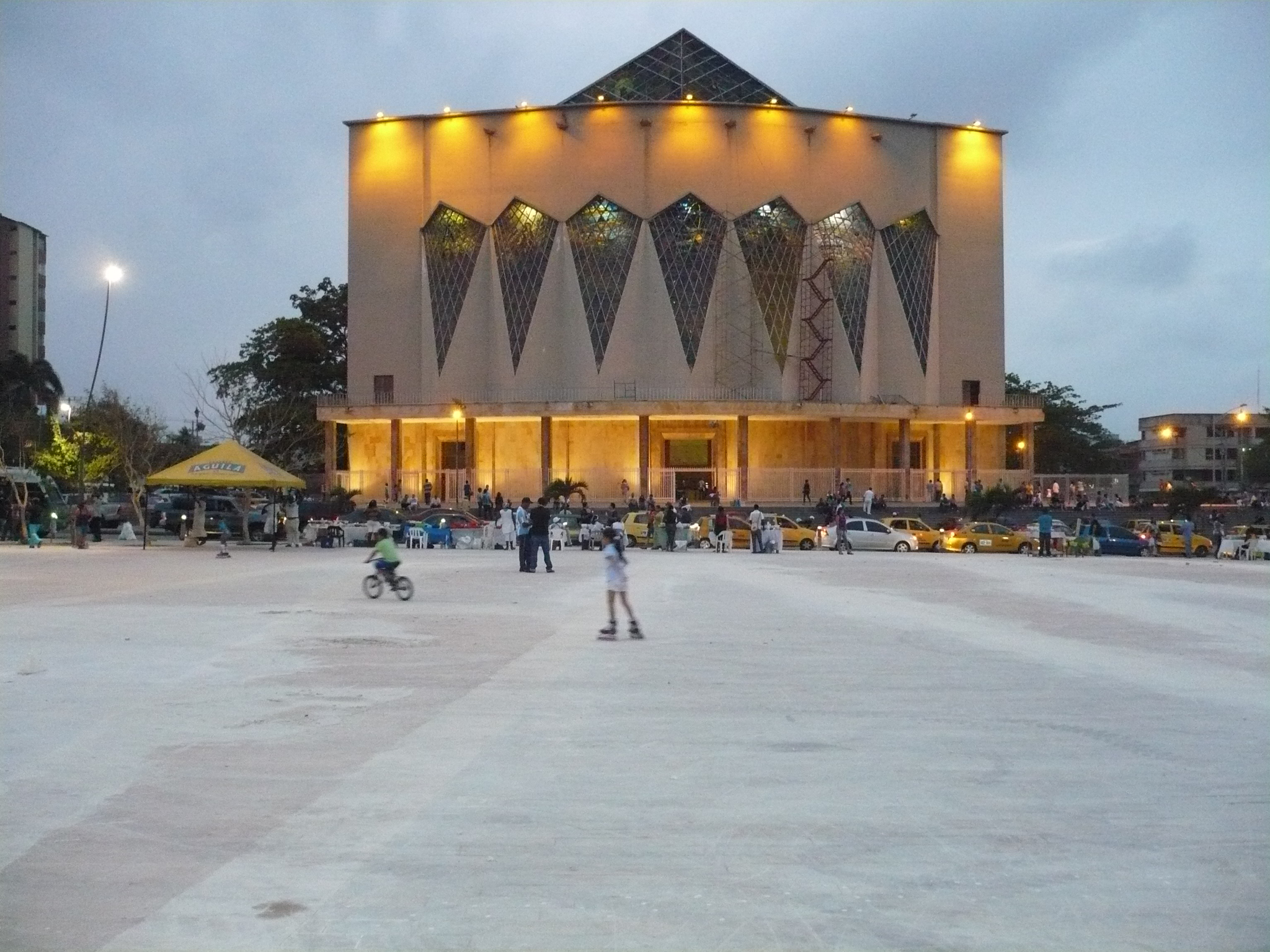
La Paz Square, where traditionally the Carnival proclamation is carried out.

=== The Crowning of the Carnival Queen ===
The coronation event for the new Carnival Queen is held on the Thursday preceding the Battle of Flowers parade. During this show, the previous carnival queen crowns the current carnival queen, amid a party with full of dancing and music. It is currently held at the Romelio Martinez Stadium. Nevertheless, the crowning act dates back from 1918 when the first carnival queen, Alicia Lafaurie Roncallo, was crowned at the disappeared Barranquilla Club. Ever since the tradition of electing the carnival queen among upper-class young women of the city to preside over the festivities have been maintained, which has made commonplace to see, read and hear how the crown has been only rotated among a few families: Gerlein, Donado, Vengoechea, Lafaurie o Abuchaibe. This tradition is mainly because a large part of the spendings, for instance those related to the attire worn by the queen during her crowning, are paid by the queen's family. This undoubtedly has been criticised since non-upper-class young women cannot aspire to hold the queen title due to the astronomically high sums of money that costs to be the carnival queen. Nevertheless, according to the official call statement, the candidate crowned as the carnival queen is that one showing excellent dancing skills, charisma and carnival spirit to the 11 members of the carnival board, who privately meet annually and elect the queen six months before the beginning of the carnival.

As for the show, it is a marathon of dancing styles, and it has become the most demanding test for the carnival queen over time, because during which the carnival queen has to demonstrate her dancing skills by gracefully dancing a myriad of musical genres, such as cumbia, salsa, merengue, champeta, mapalé, etc. This show is accompanied by members from some of the most important dancing groups participating in the carnival and by national and international singers, as the Dominican Juan Luis Guerra who made part of it in the 2014 carnivals. Also, during this event, the official song of the carnival queen is presented. By the way, the Carnival Queen is usually selected in August so that she has enough time to prepare for the Carnival.

=== The Children Parade ===
The Desfile del Carnaval de Los Niños, the first official parade of the Carnival season, is a parade for children in which school and community dancing groups participate as well as the child kings. In this parade, mini-floats adapted to the size of the children are seen travelling on the main streets of the city.

=== La Guacherna ===
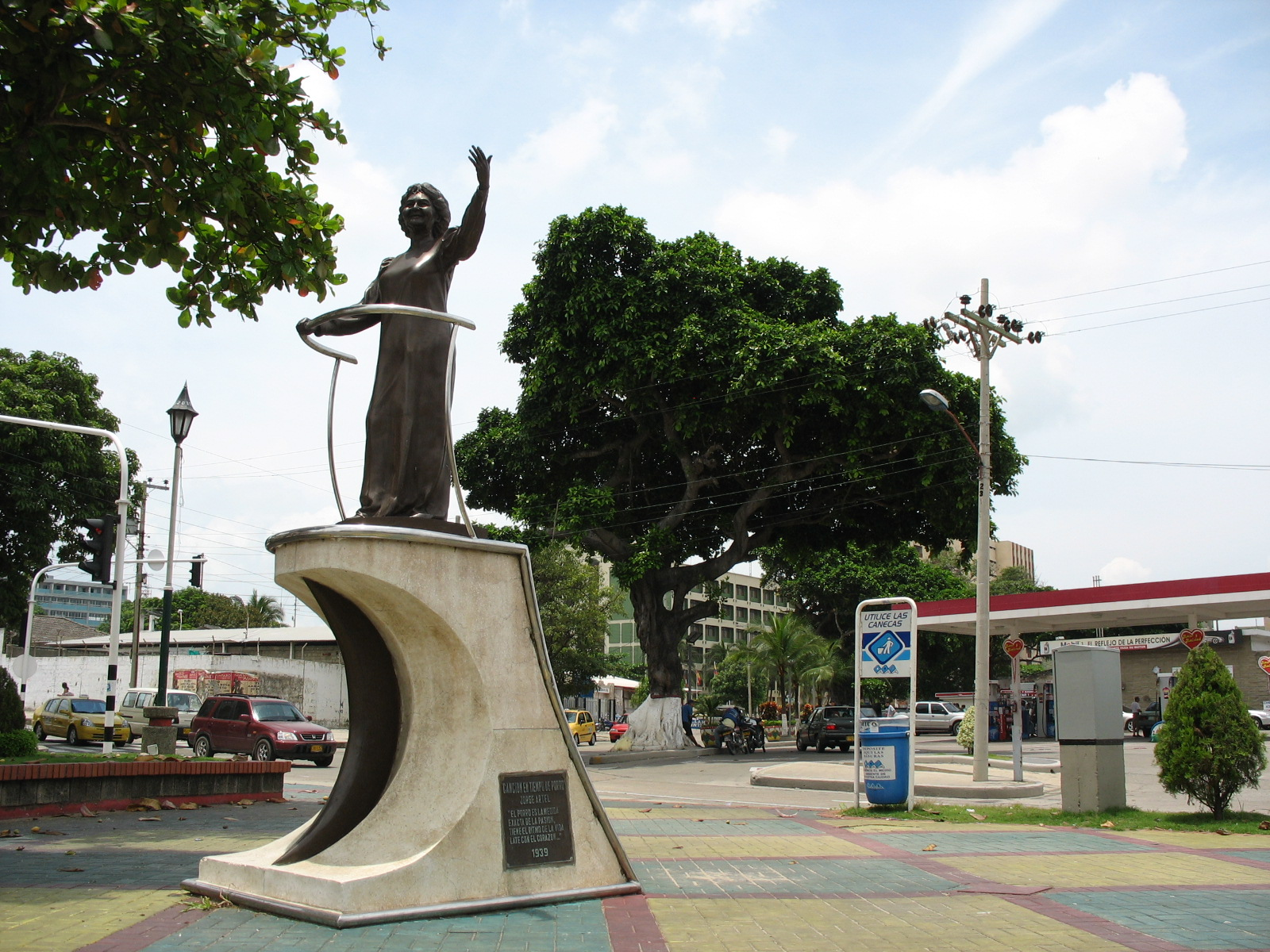
Esthercita Forero's statue, who recovered the La Guacherna's Tradition.

La Guacherna is a nocturnal parade and is considered as the most important pre-carnival event. It takes place on the Friday before the beginning of the carnival week. Many folkloric groups, cumbiambas, tamboras, disguises to the light of candles and people holding color lanterns participate in the parade itself and its related events.

La Guacherna unofficially started as early as the beginnings of the 20th century in barrio Abajo. In its beginnings, during the pre-carnival days, people used to call others by playing a guache (percussion instrument producing a similar sound to that of a maraca) to signal the commencement of dancing, which was accompanied by tamboras and flauta de millo as well as by candles to illuminate the night, making the surrounding people joyful. In 1974, this tradition was formally revived thanks to the music composer Esthercita Forero's initiative, who, along with Alicia de Andréis, achieved to make the carnival board introduce it as part in the carnival program. This parade did not exist formally until that year and it was named as La Guacherna after its creator, Esther Forero.

The idea of bringing about such a nocturnal parade in Barranquilla's Carnival dates back to a night in 1958, when Esther was at a nocturnal parade in Santiago de Cuba, prompting her to ask around among folklorists about it the following days and hence learning that the parade, named as La Conga Parade, came to existence after many small groups had been gathering from across Santiago de Cuba Province over time. She then remembered that her city, Barranquilla, did not have a nocturnal parade in its carnivals, therefore as soon as she came back to her city, she decided to achieve to bring about a similar parade and then named it as La Guacherna – that name originated from a memory she had back her childhood of when cumbia groups would go out on the streets to rehearse their rhythms and the surrounding people would say a Guacherna was passing by. In short, that great nocturnal parade was created in 1974 and still exists as a great and brightly nocturnal parade.

The insignia song of this date is the merengue song with the same name "La Guacherna", a composition by Esthercita Forero herself, and whose most known version is that of the Dominican Milly Quezada.

The carnival is celebrated during the four days before the Ash Wednesday. People party widely and wear disguises as an act of fun and a lack of inhibition. During this time, Barranquilla people and foreigners coming in the city submerse themselves in the collective joy, drinking and dancing.

=== Saturday of Carnival ===
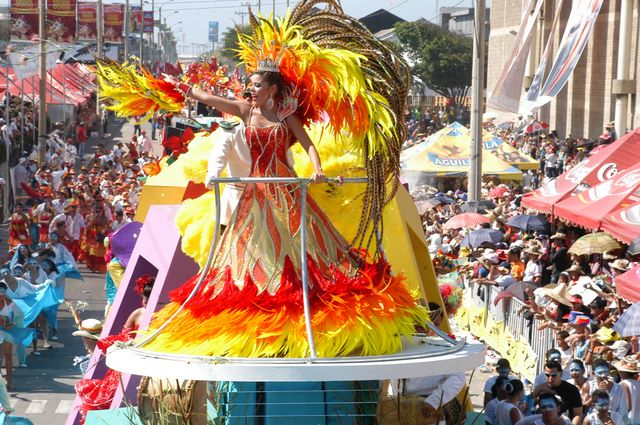
The carnival queen during the Battle of Flowers.

The Saturday before Ash Wednesday is the first full day of Carnival activities. The celebration starts off firmly with the Battle of Flowers, which is the most important and most expected event. It is a great parade of floats, headed by the Carnival queen and followed by folkloric groups, disguises, cumbia groups and other dancing groups, winners of the last carnival's competitions. It is the local version of Pasadena's Rose Parade in the United States. The Battle of Flowers is the oldest parade carried out in the Barranquilla Carnival, and was organised for the first time in 1903 through General Heriberto Arturo Vengoechea's initiative. The general who was looking for a way to celebrate the end of the long Thousand Days War that had claimed thousands of lives. With this event, the carnival resumed as it had been suspended since 1900.

Initially, the Battle of Flowers was a stroll along the old "Camellón Abello", now Paseo de Bolívar, that opened two groups of people formed by members of rich families on carriages decorated with flowers. The historian and chronicler Alfredo de la Espriella described the first battle of flowers as a game in that two groups of people got confronted each other by shooting flowers, plastic party streamers and confetti along a course extending a few miles. This battle finished with a peace gesture when both groups reconciled and went on to celebrate at Emiliano Vengoeachea theatre. Its success was such that the same battle was repeated the next year.

It has been taking place along Highway 40 since 1991, after having taken place along Olaya Herrera avenue, 43rd Street and Bolivar Boulevard. The floats now are equipped with loudspeakers and boarded by international and national singers who invites the spectators to celebrate and dance. Although the spectators are now accommodated in palcos (boxes), from where they watch the spectacle, they used to watch it on foot.

=== Sunday of Carnival ===
The most important event carried out on this day is: The great tradition and folklore parade (Gran parada de tradición y folclore).

This parade, commonly called as the great parade, is carried out on the second day of Carnival and was introduced in 1967. Only traditional folkloric groups, cumbia groups, and dancing groups participate in it. Also, it takes place along the Vía 40 avenue too, but there are no floats participating in it. This parade shows the dance and the music in their more traditional essence since there are no floats neither high loudspeakers present in it. For the year of 2013, around 300 dancing groups were counted as participants. The dancing groups participating in this parade are the ones called as popular dancing groups, such as Caimán Cienaguero, Negritas Puloy and others as that of the devil harlequins. The music also, therefore, shows its most conservative facet, being cumbias, chandés – associated with the Garabato dancing group- and fandangos -associated with the Marimondas dancing group-, the musical genres most heard.

=== Monday Of Carnival ===
It is the third day of Carnival. The two most important events carried out on this day are: The Great Fantasy Parade and the Orchestras Festival.

The Great Fantasy Parade

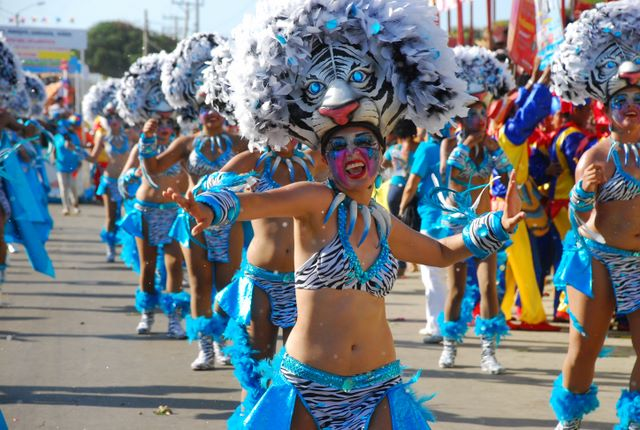
Fantasy dancing group parading.

It therefore shows innovating choreographic mixtures fluctuating from the most traditional, through the local, to the international by blending international rhythms, such as samba, salsa, reggaeton, champeta and electronic music with other local ones such as cumbia, porro, mapalé and merecumbé. This event attracts renewing proposals searching for a space in the carnival. The success of a fantasy dancing group could have a renewing meaning to the carnival itself, enriching it and helping in its development. Over time, this parade has become one of the most attended events of the carnival.

Orchestras Festival

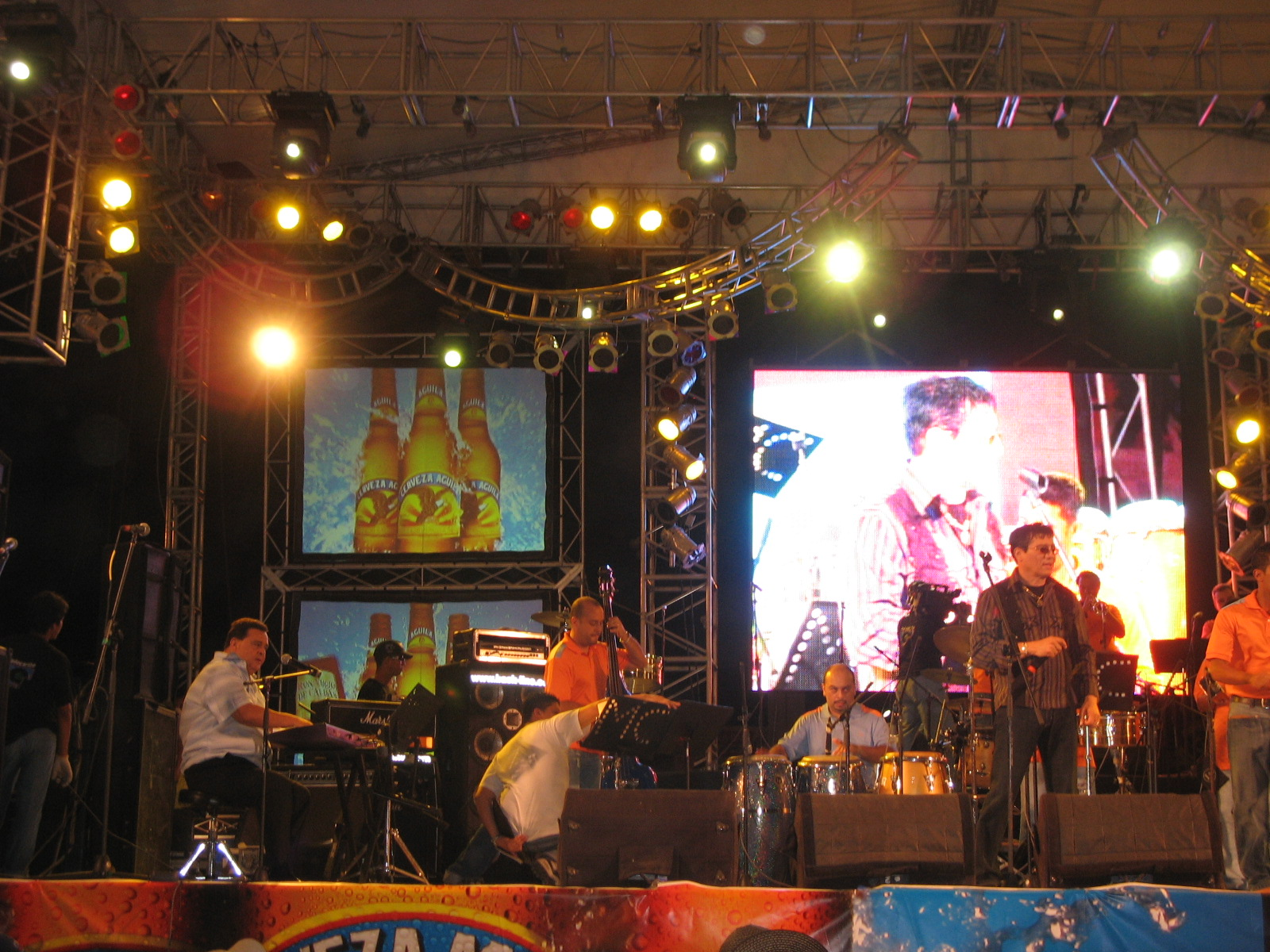
Orchestras Festival 2007. Richie Ray and Bobby Cruz Presentation.

It is a concert featuring many national and international musical ensembles, and was created in 1969. It normally starts at the early Monday afternoon lasting until the early Tuesday morning. In this festival, the participating musical ensembles compete for the coveted award called Congo de Oro in different categories. As a rule, each musical ensembles should perform three songs and at least one of them should be dedicated, in their content, to the city of Barranquilla. This event currently takes place at the Romelio Martínez Stadium. The following are the categories in which the musical ensembles vie for obtaining the Congo de Oro prize:

- Tropical. Generic term referring to musical ensembles with both a popular orchestra format and a folkloric format that perform typical musical genres from the Caribbean region and Barranquilla's Carnival such as cumbia, porro, fandango, chalupa, mapalé and others.
- Vallenato. Term referring to musical ensembles performing Vallenato and its many variations (Paseo, Son, Merengue, Puya, new trending ones), played with accordion, caja and guacharaca as main instruments.
- Salsa. Term referring to musical ensembles performing the diverse West Indian musical genres such son cubano, son montuno, pachanga, guaguancó, boogaloo, bomba, plena, mambo, cha-cha-chá, latin jazz and others.
- Merengue. Term referring to musical ensembles performing musical genres coming out of Dominican Republic and the Caribbean such as merengue, house, ragga, and others.
- Urban music. Term referring to musical ensembles performing "new styles" of urban music, such as champeta, reggaetón, hip hop, rap, dancehall and others.
- Rescuing the ours. Generic term referring to musical ensembles performing typical folkloric music such as cumbia, porro, fandango, chalupa, mapalé and others.

Likewise, special prizes are given to the best instrumentalists and the best singers of the contest.

=== Shrove Tuesday ===
This the fourth and the last day of Carnival. It is marked by the death of Joselito Carnaval, and marks the conclusion of the festivities. As a closing salvo to the events, the burial of Joselito Carnaval is held citywide, a local counterpart to the popular Spanish tradition of the entierro de la sardina performed in Spain to close out Carnival. On this day, many funny burials of Litotes are carried out across the city. This character symbolises the joy of the carnival. It is said that this character "resuscitates" on Carnival Saturday and "dies" the last day, tired and drunken, to again be revived for the next carnival. In this way, thousands of Barranquilla persons go out on the streets to cry the deceased with play-acting. Joselito Carnaval may be either a real person or a dummy, and it is used to be transported either within a coffin or stretches decorated with flowers and surrounded by its crying widows – these crying widows may be men disguised as women –. In addition to widows, there may be seen other characters as priests and orphans. It is uncertain of this character's origins. Since 1999, the Barranquilla Carnaval Foundation holds the "Joselito se va con las cenizas" contest to encourage more groups to join in this celebration and in which the best portrayal of the day, as well as the winning cast, are awarded after a long day of events. The official group of mourners includes the current Carnival Queen and her princesses and marches first before the community mourners' performances, which are presented before a panel of judges.

Joining them is the Carnival Conquest Parade, a mini version of the parades from the days prior with many of the groups that have taken part.

In the night, a jocose meeting is celebrated either at Abajo neighborhood or at La Paz square, in which litanies, with simple verses and their characteristic intonation, are recited with the aim of making either a comment or a critique on current affairs.

== Venues ==
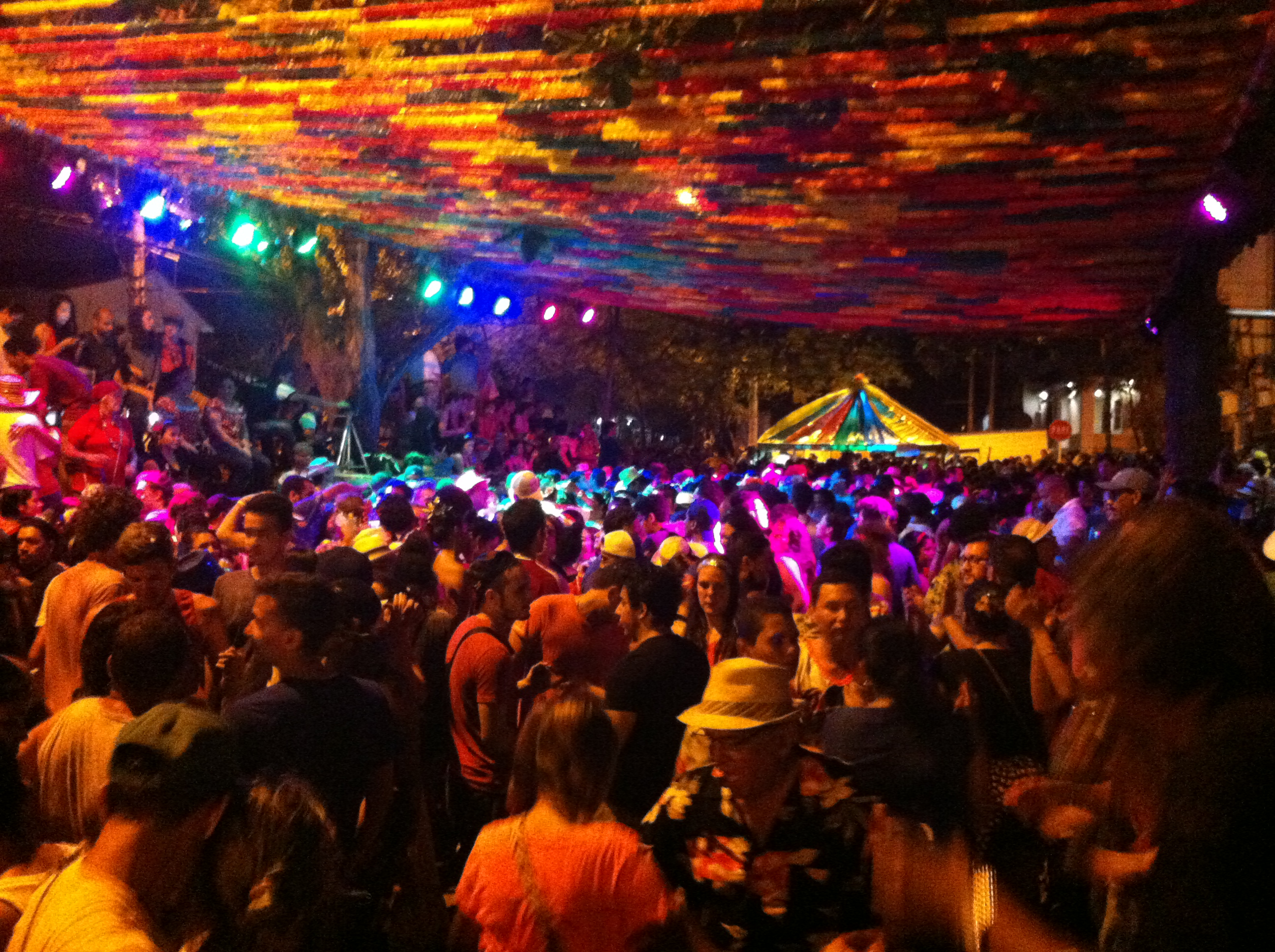
Verbena at the Barranquilla Carnival

The main Venue of the Carnival is the Vía 40, which is an industrial avenue where the Battle of Flowers (Saturday), the Great Parade (Sunday) and The Great Fantasy Parade (Monday) take place. Other venues are the 17 road (The King Momo Parade), the 44 road (Guacherna), the Romelio Martínez stadium (Orchestras festival, The queen crowning), La Paz square (the Proclamation reading), as well as verbenas and closed dancing rooms featuring live music, to which a ticket must be bought for accessing. Most of the parades can be viewed for free, but it's a good idea to buy a ticket to one of the bleacher seats for better views.

=== Verbenas ===
They are open, free-access spaces, where people can dance, eat and enjoy themselves with different activities. Verbenas are presumed to have appeared as early as the beginnings of the 20th century when surprise-visiting a residence by friends was a common activity. These surprise-visits should be assumed completely and without any hesitation by the owner of the residence as a rendezvous point for making a party. These carnival dancing encounters were commonplace in the middle-upper and upper class and were a spread activity until the official appearance of dancing rooms hosted by nightclubes and hotels. Some popular verbenas are:

- El Bambú, at the Olaya neighborhood, .
- Polvorín, at the San José neighborhood.
- A Pleno Sol, at the La Unión neighborhood.
- La Gustadera, at the Las Nieves neighborhood.
- La Puya loca, at the Los Pinos neighborhood.

=== Donkey Rooms ===
These were semi-open, free access rooms where people met to dance and enjoy themselves. That particular, curious name came from the fact people used to leave their donkeys tied to a post outside the room just before entering.

== Music and Dancing ==
The music consists of a mixture of cumbia, porro, mapalé, gaita, chandé, puya, fandango, and merecumbé, which are traditional styles of Colombian music. The celebration brings together cultural traditions and creativity, expressed through forms of dance, music, and traditional costumes. This characterizes the event as a community festival where locals play primary roles. Each dance, folkloric group, and costume contributes to the overall performance.

The Barranquilla Carnival is multicultural, diverse, and rich in different cultural expressions. There are traditional dances, choreographic dances; Comparsas (a form of live music), with which the choreography and creativity of dances are expressed; Comedies, like litany are traditional and folkloric popular theater, these are traditional groups that sing in groups. These can be individual, or collectives, structural, and dramatic.

== Costumes and dances ==
The Marimondas, which are hooded figures with long noses, floppy ears and bright trousers and vests, are the most popular costume. A character that appears like a monkey mixed with an elephant dressed in bright colors.

Other traditional costumes are El Garabato, El Africano, Drácula, El Torito, El Congo, El Monocuco, Los Cabezones, Las Muñeconas, and El Tigrillo. Each costume represents something, and were originated with authenticity, some are based on other costumes around the world but mostly they all have Colombian roots and have a meaning for the barranquilleros specially.

The Carnival's dances are: La Cumbia, El Garabato, El Son de Negro, El Congo, El Mapalé, El Caiman, El Paloteo, El Gusano, Las Farotas, De Relacion and Las Pilanderas.

"The cumbia is a good example of the fusion of Indian, Black and White elements that simulates a couple courting and is characterized by the elegance and subtle movements of the woman's hips to the rhythm of a drum, accordions, maracas, and flute." Another of the main dances is the Garabato, which represents a mystical battle between life and death. The Congo represents African tradition in its movement and also the memory of slavery in America.

== Queens of the Carnival ==
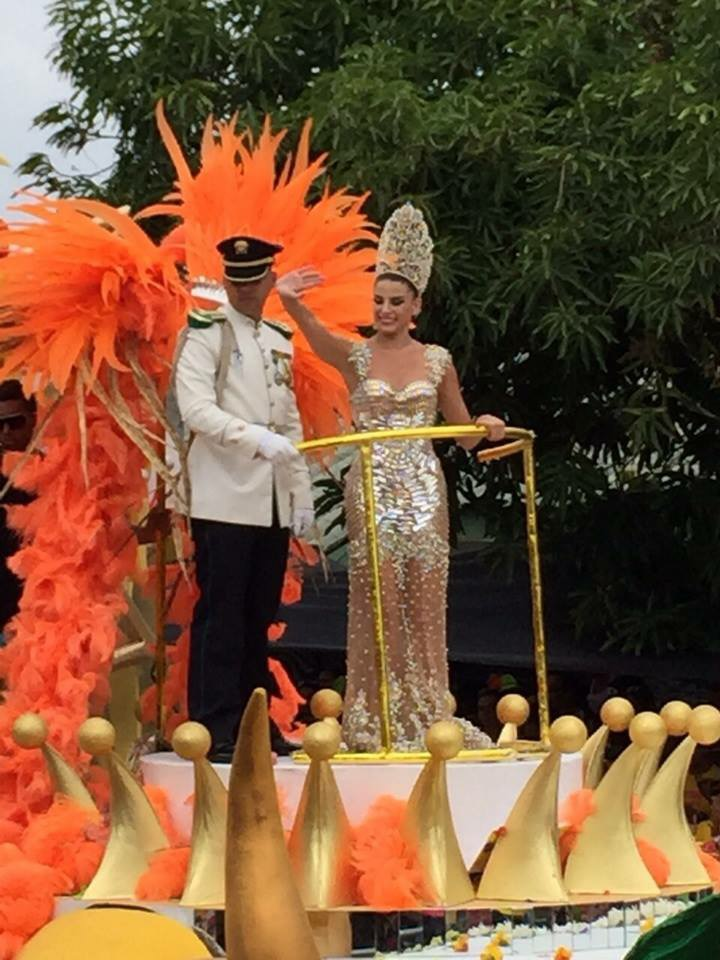
Cristina Felfle as queen in 2015.

- 1918– Alicia Lafaurie Roncallo
- 1919– Dilia Baena Lavalle
- 1920– Paulina Sojo
- 1921– Director y and weekly queens
- 1922– Rosita Lafaurie
- 1923– Toña Vengoechea Vives
- 1924– Isabel Elvira Sojo
- 1925– Sarita Roncallo
- 1926– Olga Heilbron Tavera
- 1927– Rebeca Donado Ucrós
- 1928– Josefina Vives Ballestas
- 1929– Consejo de regencia
- 1930–1934 No queens were elected
- 1935– Alicia Falquez Grau
- 1936– Josefina Osio
- 1937–1941 Town captains were elected
- 1942– Lolita Obregón Benjumea
- 1943– Carmiña Navarro Donado
- 1944– Niní Munárriz Steffens
- 1945– Judith Blanco de Andréis
- 1946– Tica Manotas Rodríguez
- 1947– Ana María Emiliani
- 1948– Paulina Carbonell Villalba y Gloria Rocaniz Fuenmayor (captains of single and married dance appearances)
- 1949– Leonor González McCausland
- 1950– Edith Munárriz Steffens
- 1951– Cecilia Gómez Nigrinis
- 1952– Gladys Rosanía
- 1953– Carolina Manotas
- 1954– Adelina Segovia
- 1955– Lucía Ruiz Armenta
- 1956– Carmiña Moreno Vengoechea
- 1957– Margarita Angulo
- 1958– Vilma Escolar Nieto
- 1959– Marvel Luz Moreno
- 1960– Lilia Arévalo Duncan
- 1961– Edith Ulloque
- 1962– Julieta Devis Pereira
- 1963– Martha Ligia Restrepo
- 1964– Carmen Vergara Vengoechea
- 1965– Lucy Abuchaibe
- 1966– Josefina Martínez Armenta
- 1967– Martha Luz Vásquez
- 1968– Rocío García Bossa
- 1969– Luz Elena Restrepo
- 1970– Ligia Salcedo
- 1971– Clarissa Lafaurie
- 1972– Margarita Rosa Donado
- 1973– Fedora Escolar
- 1974– Vicky de Andréis
- 1975– Regina Margarita Sojo
- 1976– Katia González Ripoll
- 1977– Nohora Aduén Lafaurie
- 1978– Patricia Abello Marino
- 1979– Thelma García Méndez (quit)
- 1979– Esther (Tey) Cecilia Cadena Buitrago
- 1980– Ana María Donado
- 1981– Silvana González Martelo
- 1982– Mireya Caballero
- 1983– Luz Maria Rincón Pérez
- 1984– Flavia Santoro
- 1985– Luz Marina Atehortúa
- 1986– Silvia Tcherassi
- 1987– Maribel Fernández De Castro
- 1988– Margarita Gerlein Villa
- 1989– Laura Char Carson
- 1990– María José Vengoechea Devis
- 1991– Liliana Gerlein Villa
- 1992– Brigitte Abuchaibe
- 1993– Claudia Dangond Lacouture
- 1994– Danitza Abuchaibe Costa
- 1995– Katia Nule Marino
- 1996– María Cecilia Donado García
- 1997– María Alicia Gerlein Arana
- 1998– Liliana Hoyos Sánchez
- 1999– Julia Carolina de la Rosa Valiente
- 2000– Claudia Patricia Guzmán Certain
- 2001– Ilse Margarita Cuello Gieseken
- 2002– María Gabriela Diago García
- 2003– Margarita Lora Gerlein
- 2004– Olga Lucía Rodríguez Pérez
- 2005– Kathy Flesch Guinovart
- 2006– María Isabel Dávila Clavijo
- 2007– Daniella Donado Visbal
- 2008– Angie De la Cruz Yepes
- 2009– Marianna Schlegel Donado
- 2010– Giselle Marie Lacouture Paccini
- 2011– Marcela Dávila Márquez
- 2012– Andrea Jaramillo Char
- 2013– Daniela Cepeda Tarud
- 2014– María Margarita Diazgranados Gerlein
- 2015– Cristina Felfle Fernández de Castro
- 2016– Marcela García Caballero
- 2017– Stephanie "Fefi" Mendoza
- 2018– Valeria Abuchaibe Rosales
- 2019– Carolina Segebre Abudinen
- 2020– Isabella Chams Vega
- 2021– No Carnival (COVID)
- 2022– Valeria Charris Salcedo
- 2023– Natalia De Castro González
- 2024– Melissa Cure
- 2025- Tatiana Angulo Fernández de Castro
- 2026- Michelle Char Fernández

== See also ==
- Carnival in Colombia
- Festivals in Colombia
- Masterpieces of the Oral and Intangible Heritage of Humanity
- UNESCO Intangible Cultural Heritage Lists
- Rijeka Carnival
