= King Momo =

Performer in Latin American festivities

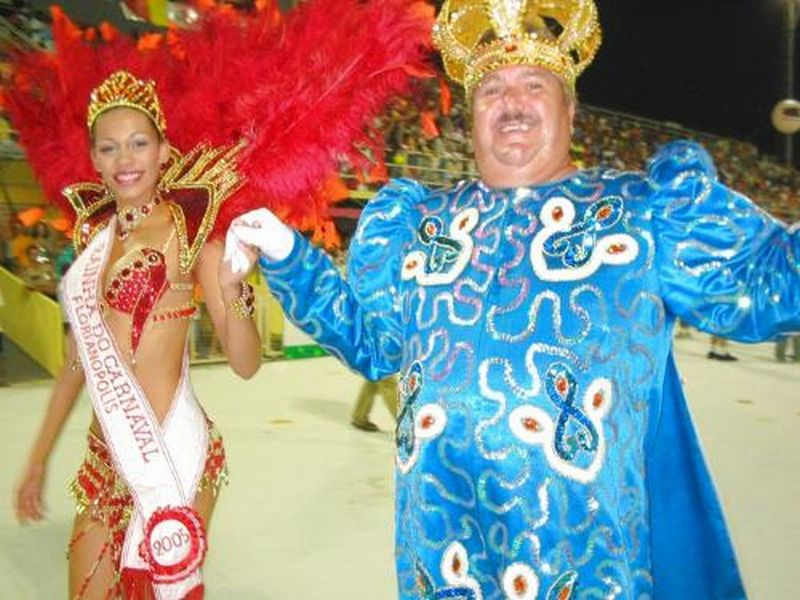
King Momo at Florianópolis's Carnival, in 2005

King Momo (alternatively known as King Momos or King Momus in English, Rei Momo in Portuguese, Rey Momo in Spanish, and Rex Momus in Latin) is considered the king of Carnivals in numerous Latin American festivities, mainly in Brazil and Colombia. His appearance signifies the beginning of the Carnival festivities. Each carnival has its own King Momo, who is often given the key to the city. Traditionally, a tall, fat man is chosen to fulfill the role because the original King Momo was of that physical stature.

In Argentina and Uruguay, Rey Momo is more often represented by a big, sometimes monumental, doll made of papier-mâché over a wooden or wire structure. In these cases it is carried in a tow or at the top of a truck, and presides the carnival with a royal court of dancers. While a doll, it conserves its traditional features: flamboyant and colorful clothing, a smiling or joyful face and a prominent belly. It many places, the doll is burned at the end of the festivities, also being its climax, but this practice is being discouraged in recent times for safety reasons. Also in the former Portuguese-ruled Goa, India, at the Carnival Parade, a person is selected to play the part of King Momo. Sixtus Eric Dias from Candolim was selected in 2021.

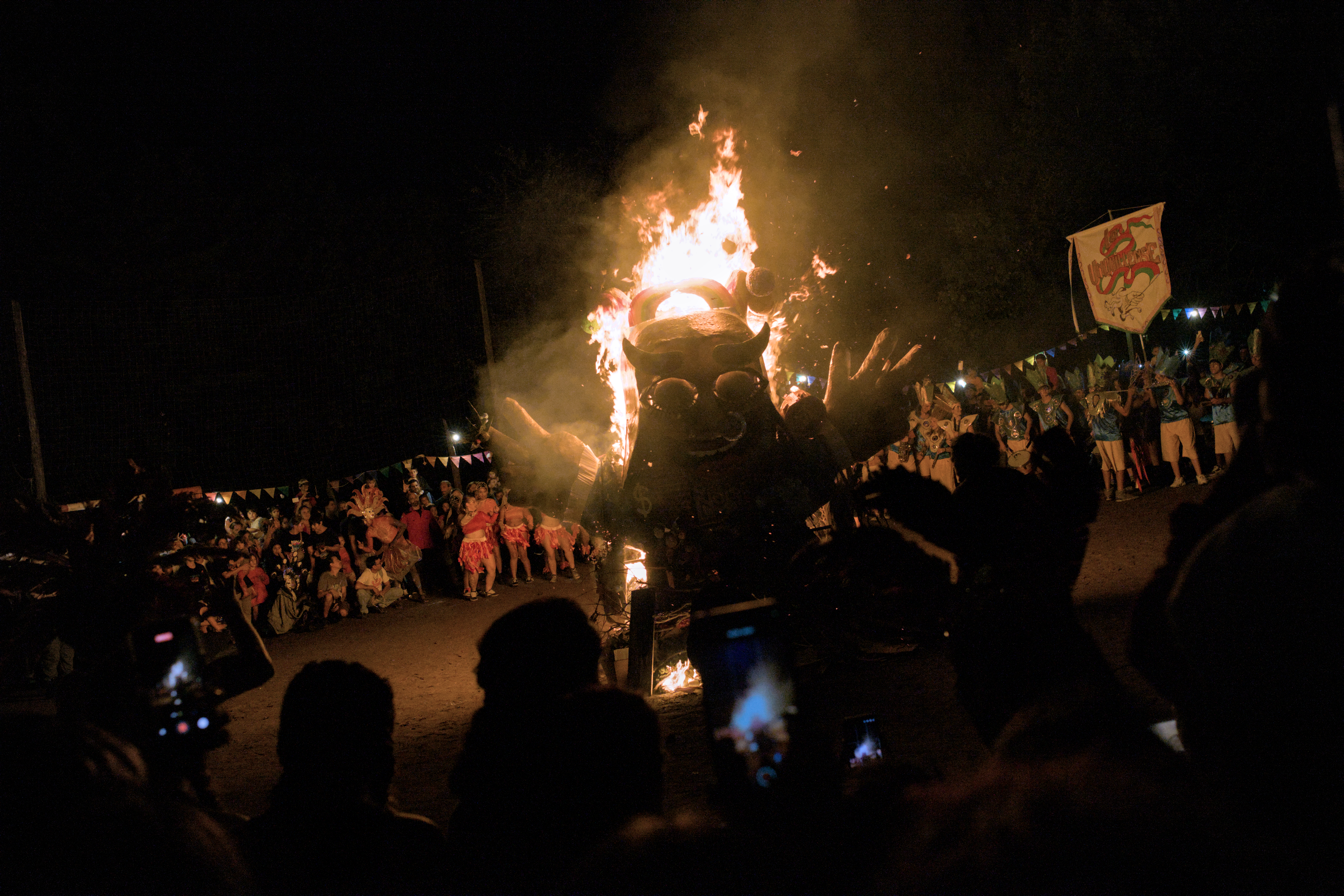
A papier-mache doll of King Momo being burned at the Carnival in Villa Ani Mi, province of Córdoba, Argentina

== Origin ==
King Momus derives from the Greek god Momus (μῶμος) .

== King Momos of Rio de Janeiro ==
Probably the most famous of the King Momos are found in Rio de Janeiro where the tradition of a presiding king goes back to 1933. :

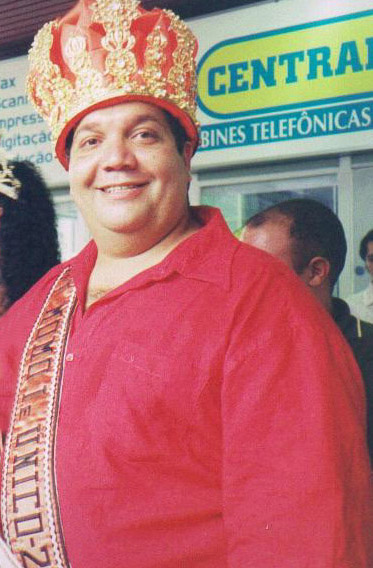
Marcelo Reis, King Momo of Carioca Carnival in 2005

Period	Name	Ref.
1933-1948	Paper Mache Doll	
1949-1950	Gustavo Mattos	
1951-1957	Nélson Nobre	
1958-1971	Abrahão Haddad	
1972	Edson Seraphin de Santana	
1973	Elson Macula	
1974-1982	Edson Seraphin de Santana	
1983	Paolo Vicente Paccelli	
1984	Roberto Barbosa de Castro	
1985-1986	Edson Seraphin de Santana	
1987-1995	Reynaldo Bola	
1996	Paulo César Braga Champorry	
1997-2003	Alex Oliveira	
2004	Wagner Monteiro	
2005	Marcelo de Jesus Reis	
2006-2008	Alex Oliveira	
2009-2013	Milton Júnior	
2014-2016	Wilson Neto	
2017	Fábio Damião dos Santos Antunes	
2018	Milton Júnior	

== King Momos of Santos ==
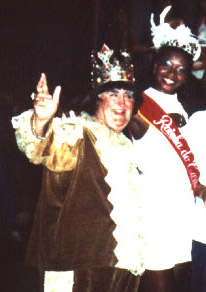
Waldemar Esteves da Cunha, King Momo of Santos, with the Queen Mira, in Brazilian Carnival of 1988

Waldemar Esteves da Cunha (born 1920 - died 2013) was King Momo of Santos from 1950 to 1956 and from 1958 to 1990, and until he was 92 and pensioned, he was the oldest Momo in Brazil.

== See also ==
- Rex parade
