= Caña de millo =

Woodwind musical instrument

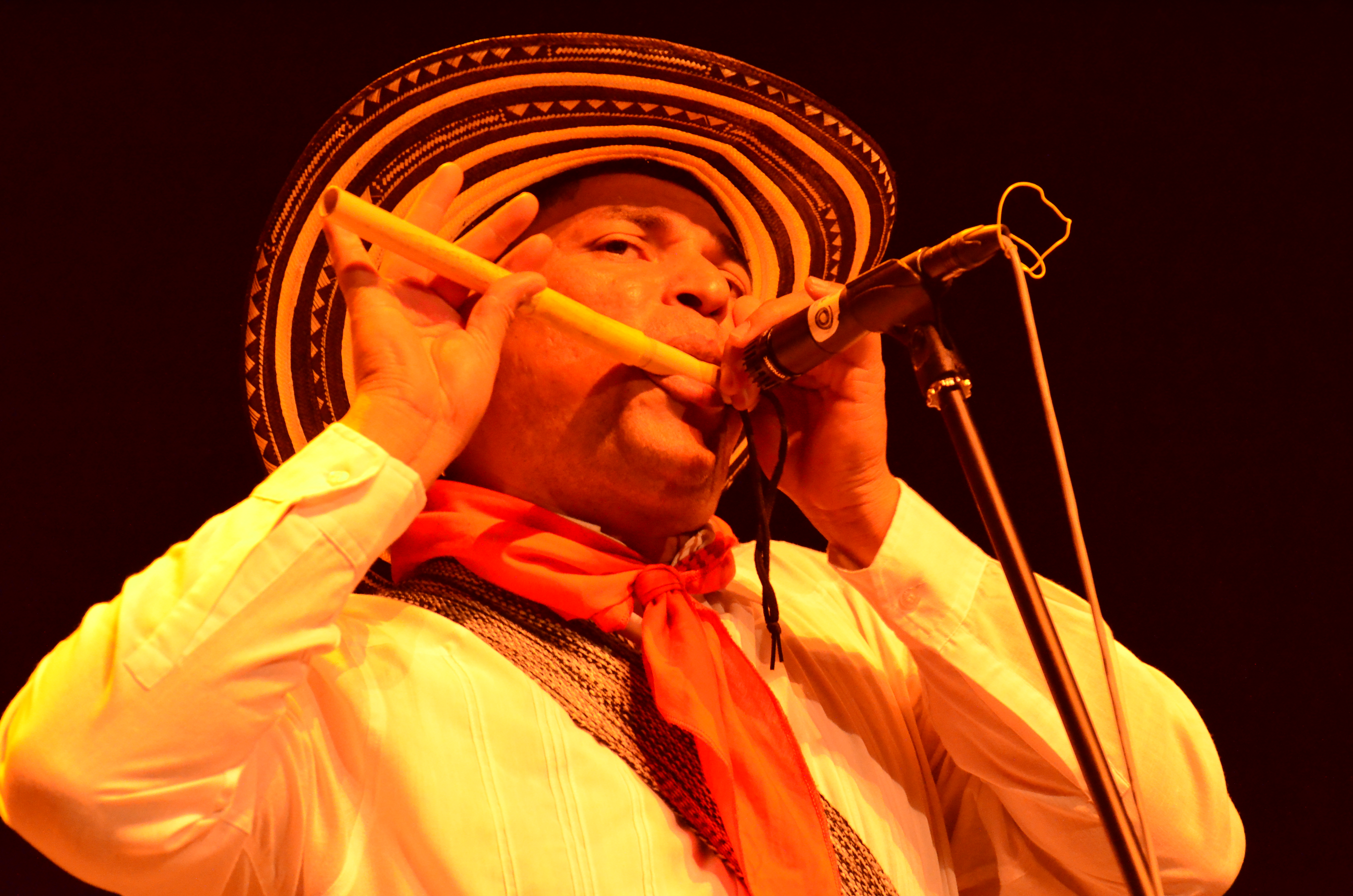
Caña de millo played by Los Gaiteros de San Jacinto

The caña de millo, flauta de millo or pito atravesao is a woodwind musical instrument of indigenous origin used in the cumbia music of Colombia's Caribbean coast.

It is made of carrizo cane (Phragmites australis), palm, millet, sorghum, or similar stalks, forming a tube open at both ends, with a vibrating tongue (reed) cut of the same material as the tube, with four fingerholes. It is played transverse, and used by folkloric musical ensembles called grupos de millo. The caña de millo replaces the kuisi (or gaita) in regions of the Colombian departments of Atlántico and Magdalena.

Similar instruments are found in most of the savannah region of West Africa.

== Characteristics ==
The caña de millo is open at both ends and resembles a small flute. It measures about 20 to 30 centimeters in length and has four tonal holes of approximately 1.5 to 2 centimeters in diameter, separated by 1, 1.5, or 3 centimeters each. The tongue is thin, located at one end about 10 cm from the holes, measuring 4 to 6 centimeters long by 4 to 6 millimeters wide. Below the fixed end of the tongue, a thread passes through that allows it to vibrate. At the top of the instrument is a string so that the performer may hold the instrument with the fingers of the left hand (with the exception of the thumb which is used to cover and uncover the hole in the tube near the vibrating tab). The tongue is constructed from the bark of a cane, and forms the mouthpiece through which the air enters and leaves.

== Performance ==
The caña de millo is unusual because of the variety of ways in which it can be played. There are four main ways to produce the notes: the first is the traditional way of blowing a flute, expelling air through the reed; the second is by inhaling the air through the reed to produce the highest notes of the flute; the third is known as gargling, which consists of vibrating the tongue with an exhalation of air that occurs from the throat, as if one were gargling; and the fourth is expelling the air and at the same time covering the hole of the cylinder or tube (this is on the side of the tongue). This last sound is called tapa'o and one can vary its tonality by covering the 4 holes with your fingers. The caña de millo is constructed in a variety of different keys.

== Other names ==
The instrument is known by other names such as flauta traversa de millo, carrizo, lata, or bambú. In Atlántico department it is known as the flauta or caña de millo, and in the savannahs of Bolívar, Córdoba and Sucre it is called pito atravesado. A player is referred to as a cañamillero.
