= León Cardona =

Colombian musician and songwriter

- Born: Leonel Cardona García; 10 August 1927; Yolombó, Colombia
- Died: 3 December 2023 (aged 96) Medellín, Colombia

Leonel Cardona García (Note: In this Spanish name, the first or paternal surname is Cardona and the second or maternal family name is García.) (1927 – 2023), known as León Cardona, was a Colombian musician and songwriter. He wrote over 130 songs, and recorded with several Colombian artists including Jaime Llano González and the Trío Morales Pino.

== Biography ==
=== Early life and education ===
Leonel Cardona García was born on 10 August 1927 in Yolombó, in the Colombian department of Antioquia, to Abel Cardona and Cecilia García. His mother Cecilia was a guitarist, and she taught him to play as a child.

Cardona studied music at the Institute of Fine Arts in Medellín, where his teachers included Alex Tovar, Antonio María Peñaloza, Eusebio Ochoa, José María Tena, and Gregory Stone. He initially learned flute, but changed to guitar.

=== Music career ===
In 1952, Cardona was given a Gibson Les Paul by a cousin of his who had bought it in the United States. He moved to Bogotá at the invitation of Guatemalan musician Bob Lafuente and joined the band of the Grill Europa restaurant. While in Bogotá, Cardona played guitar on the 1961 album Luis Rovira Sexteto by Spanish clarinetist Luis Rovira, which music critic Jaime Monsalve has called the first jazz album recorded in Colombia.

In the early 1960s Cardona moved back to Medellín, where he became artistic director for the record label Sonolux, and was arranger for the Orquesta Sonolux, alongside Luis Uribe Bueno, Juancho Vargas, and Edmundo Arias.

In 1968, Cardona put the poems "El Premio", "La Mejora", and "No Abandones Tu Tierra" by Óscar Hernández Monsalve to music. The resulting songs were recorded by Leonor González Mina for her 1968 album La Internacional. In the 1980s Cardona and Hernández Monsalve worked together again, producing 14 further collaborative songs. In total Cardona wrote over 130 songs, mostly instrumental, in various styles including bambuco, pasillo, torbellino, and waltz.

In the course of his career Cardona recorded with several other Colombian artists including Jaime Llano González, Obdulio y Julián, Felipe Henao, and the Trío Morales Pino. He was in the Trío Instrumental Colombiano, who won first prize at the 1989 Concurso Nacional de Intérpretes de Música Colombiana. Cardona was awarded the Alberto Castilla medal of the Tolima Conservatory in 1992.

=== Death ===
Cardona died on 3 December 2023 in Medellín.
