= Morgan Blanco =

Colombian accordionist and songwriter

- Born: Morgan Enrique Blanco Borrero; 17 September 1935; Barranquilla, Colombia
- Died: 13 April 2021 (aged 85) Barranquilla, Colombia

Morgan Enrique Blanco Borrero (Note: In this Spanish name, the first or paternal surname is Blanco and the second or maternal family name is Borrero.) (1935–2021) was a Colombian accordionist and songwriter. He recorded with several Colombian singers and musicians including Pacho Galán, Aníbal Velásquez, and Antonio María Peñaloza.

== Biography ==
Blanco was born on 17 September 1935 in Barranquilla, in the Colombian department of Atlántico. As a child Blanco was inspired by the music of the Barranquilla Carnival to teach himself accordion. He then came across the music of Luis Enrique Martínez and Abel Antonio Villa, "who influenced the style he later consolidated in the Sonora Vallenata with Carlos Román." His first band was a conjunto that he formed with his brother Abel and Carlos García.

In 1956 Blanco met Carlos Román Sulbarán, with whom he recorded regularly until Román's death in 1973. Blanco's first recordings were made with Román in 1957, and he played accordion on Román's recording of "Very Very Well" in 1958, which was the first rock and roll song recorded in Colombia. Blanco later played accordion with José María Peñaranda, Alci Acosta, Daniel Santos, Pacho Galán, Aníbal Velásquez, and Antonio María Peñaloza.

Blanco retired from music in the 1980s. He died on 13 April 2021 in Barranquilla.

== Musical style and compositions ==
Blanco wrote and recorded in several styles including guaracha, salsa, cumbia, bolero, and ranchera. His notable compositions include "Negra Ron y Velas", "Los Más Lindo de la Vida es la Mujer", "El Pollerón", "Carita Pintá", "No Me Vuelvo a Enamorar", "La Mona", and "A la Mujer Hay Que Darle Confianza".
