= Antonio María Peñaloza =

Colombian musician, arranger, and songwriter

- Born: Antonio María Peñaloza Cervantes; 25 December 1916; Plato, Colombia
- Died: 18 July 2005 (aged 88) Barranquilla, Colombia

Antonio María Peñaloza Cervantes (Note: In this Spanish name, the first or paternal surname is Peñaloza and the second or maternal family name is Cervantes.) (1916–2005) was a Colombian musician, arranger, and songwriter. His composition "Te Olvidé" is considered an anthem of the Barranquilla Carnival. Peter Wade wrote that "Peñaloza is significant for the way he mediated between rural and urban areas, between classes, and between musical traditions."

== Biography ==
=== Early life ===
Peñaloza was born on 25 December 1916 in Plato, in the Magdalena Department of Colombia. His father was a guitarist, and his grandfather was an accordionist. Peñaloza grew up with his mother on a hacienda, where he was exposed to the music of the Colombian coast. They later moved to Fundación, where his mother bought him a trumpet which he was taught to play by Andrés Ospino. After 12 years in Fundación Peñaloza moved to Aracataca, where he was taught by Rafael Acosta, and then to Ciénaga.

=== Music career ===
In 1935 Peñaloza moved to Barranquilla where he joined Luis Felipe Sosa's band. He toured Colombia with the band, and also studied at the Barranquilla music conservatory under Pedro Biava. When Sosa died, his trombonist Guido Perla formed the Emisora Atlántico Jazz Band, which Peñaloza joined for a time.

Peñaloza moved to Bogotá in 1941 to work at the Nueva Granada radio station. He studied with Demetrio Haralambis, and in 1942 got a job playing the bugle in the band of the Conservatorio de Bogotá. In Bogotá Peñaloza also played with the orchestra of the Emisora Nueva Granada, and famously had an altercation with the director Francisco Cristancho Camargo during his first rehearsal, while playing the bambuco "Chatica Linda" by Jorge Camargo Spolidore. Peter Wade writes:

The first piece he was required to play was a bambuco with which, like many Costeño composers, he was already very familiar. Peñaloza had his own ideas about bambuco and ventured the opinion that the piece was wrongly written. "We [he and Cristancho] had been presented very politely, in Bogotá style, but when I said that, the guy me negreó [called me, treated me like, a black] straight away: 'Listen, negrito, you should know that in order to play bambuco you have to eat chunchullo, sobrebarriga, and chicha.'"

Spurred by this interaction, Peñaloza travelled around Colombia researching the origins of bambuco.

By 1943 Peñaloza was living in Medellín, where he continued to work as a musician. Three years later he briefly accompanied the duo Fortich y Valencia on a tour in Lima, and then returned to Medellín where in 1947–8 he was director of the radio station La Voz de Antioquia. At some point in Medellín he also played with the Orquesta Sonolux, and with the groups of Edmundo Arias and Pello Torres.

Later Peñaloza returned to Barranquilla where he led his own bands (under various names, including the Orquesta Sono Ritmo) until the late 1980s. He also taught music and musicology at several universities in the Colombian Caribbean.

=== Personal life and death ===
Peñaloza had two children with his first wife Lucila Valencia, four with his second wife Graciela Yabur, and one other. He died on 18 July 2005 in Barranquilla of complications due to arterial thrombosis in his leg.

== Musical style and compositions ==
=== "Te Olvidé" ===
Peñaloza's chandé composition "Te Olvidé" is considered an anthem of the Barranquilla Carnival. The lyrics of the song were adapted from a poem by Mariano San Ildefonso. "Te Olvidé" was first recorded in 1954 by the Sonora Curro; Alberto Fernández Mindiola sang vocals because he happened to be in the recording studio when Tito Cortés, who was booked to record the vocals, failed to appear.

=== Other compositions ===
Peñaloza wrote "Adiós Fulana" for his first wife after they separated, and it was recorded by Totó la Momposina and Joe Arroyo. His song "Mátese Media Vaca" was popularised by Matilde Díaz and Lucho Bermúdez. Other notable compositions of his include "Danza del Garabato", "Danza del Sol", "Flores de la Montaña", "Mochílisimo", "Perla", and "Repiti Ripititi".

=== Siete Sabrosuras Bailables y una Vieja Serenata Costeña ===
Radio Nacional de Colombia described Peñaloza's album Siete Sabrosuras Bailables y una Vieja Serenata Costeña (1980, Sonolux) as his "most avant-garde and endearing" work. The album is the only one ever attributed to the Banda de Peñaloza, which comprised Omar Cañate on saxophone and Peñaloza playing every other instrument.
