= Ramón Ropaín =

Colombian pianist (1916–1986)

- Born: Ramón Antonio Ropaín Elías; 23 December 1916; Ciénaga, Colombia
- Died: 2 April 1986 (aged 69) Barranquilla, Colombia

Ramón Antonio Ropaín Elías (Note: In this Spanish name, the first or paternal surname is Ropaín and the second or maternal family name is Elías.) (1916–1986) was a Colombian pianist, songwriter, bandleader, and arranger. He played in the orchestras of Lucho Bermúdez and Juancho Vargas, and led several orchestras of his own in Bogotá.

== Early life and education ==
Ropaín was born on 23 December 1916 (Note: Ropaín claimed to have been born in 1920, but according to his daughter, he was actually born in 1916.) in Ciénaga, in the Colombian department of Magdalena. His parents were Clemente Ropaín, a farmer, and Delia Elías. He went to primary school at the Colegio La Esperanza in Cartagena, and obtained his high school baccelaureate in 1942 from the Colegio Mayor de Neustra Señora del Rosario in Bogotá.

In 1947–1948, Ropaín studied three semesters of medicine at the Universidad del Rosario in Bogotá. There he was taught piano by José Vicente Castro, and he was later taught by Pedro Biava in Barranquilla. Ropaín then went to Philadelphia in the United States, where he studied pharmacy, and also attended the Juilliard School in New York alongside Colombian guitarist Álvaro Dalmar.

== Music career ==
Ropaín returned to Barranquilla and worked as a pharmacist while pursuing music on the side. In 1950 he went to Medellín and joined the orchestra of Lucho Bermúdez as a pianist, alongside musicians including Luis Uribe Bueno and Pacho Galán. He also played in the orchestra of Juancho Vargas. Ropaín then went to Bogotá and in 1955–1956 founded his own orchestra, who performed regularly at the Club Militar. He became involved in the early years of television in Colombia, producing some programmes and writing soundtracks for others, as well as appearing regularly on the radio. In Bogotá he also recorded his first LP, Festival Musical, featuring vocals from las Hermanas Montoya.

In the 1960s, Ropaín was musical director and pianist for Hernando Monroy's Ballet Folclórico Gran Colombiano. He travelled with them to Mexico, and when they returned to Colombia he stayed on contract with RCA Victor. He later returned to Bogotá and again led his own orchestra, with whom he released several LPs on CBS. Ropaín eventually moved back to Barranquilla where he lived until his death.

=== Musical style and compositions ===
Radio Nacional de Colombia described Ropaín as "one of the key figures of the Caribbean sound, instrumental music, and the genesis of Colombian jazz." He wrote over 80 songs in styles including bambuco, bolero, cumbia, and pasillo. His compositions include "Currucuteando", "Brinca la Cuerda", and "Claudia", and have been recorded by artists including Billo's Caracas Boys, los Melódicos, and Lucho Bermúdez.

Ropaín led bands under several different names, including the Combo Bonito, Don Ropa y sus Estrellas, and el Sexteto Daro.

== Personal life and death ==
Ropaín was married to singer Teresa García, and they had six children. He died on 2 April 1986 in Barranquilla.
