= Ritmo! =

Studio album by Sonora Dinamita
- Released: 1960
- Genre: Cumbia (Colombia)
- Label: Discos Fuentes

Ritmo! is a cumbia album from the Colombian musical group Sonora Dinamita. It was released on the Discos Fuentes label.

The album has been described as "a fundamental pillar in the development and dissemination of Colombian cumbia." The group featured vocals by bandleader Lucho Argain with an all-star band that included Lalo Orozco on piano, Clodomiro Montes on drums, Saúl Torres and Ángel Mattos on trumpets, Pedro Laza on bass, Guillermo Martínez on guitar, Gil Cantillo on "el tres", Poli and "Mono" Martínez on "los coros", and Enrique Bonfante on the congas.

In a 2024 ranking of the 600 greatest Latin American albums, Ritmo! was ranked No. 53.

== Track listing ==
A1 Eco En Stereo - Son Afro (Toño Fuentes)
A2 Si La Vieran - Paseaito (Luis Pérez)
A3 Baila El Jalao - Jalaito (Luis Pérez)
A4 Ritmo De Tambo - Cumbia (B. Saldarriaga)
A5 Ritmo Loco - Montuno (Toño Fuentes)
A6 Quitate Quitate - Merengue (Lalo Orozco)

B1 Ritmo Tropical - Canto Negro (Luis Pérez)
B2 Taqui Ti Taqui - Guaracha (Luis Pérez)
B3 Mayen Raye - Son Haitiano (Luis Pérez)
B4 Yo La Vi - Guajira (Luis Pérez)
B5 Yo No Trabajo - Guaracha (Lalo Orozco)
B6 La Boa - Cha cha cha (C. J.. Reyes, F. Reina)
