= Crescencio Camacho =

Colombian singer and songwriter

- Born: Crescencio Camacho Olivo; 14 September 1918; Villanueva, Colombia
- Died: 13 December 2014 (aged 96) Cartagena, Colombia

Crescencio Camacho Olivo (Note: In this Spanish name, the first or paternal surname is Camacho and the second or maternal family name is Olivo.) (1918–2014) was a Colombian singer and songwriter. He was a member of Pedro Laza y sus Pelayeros, and later led his own orchestra.

== Biography ==
=== Early life ===
Camacho was born on 14 September 1918 in Villanueva, in the Colombian department of Bolívar. His parents were Rafael Camacho and Ana Isabel Olivo.

=== Music career ===
Pedro Laza heard Camacho singing in Villanueva, and invited him to join his orchestra Pedro Laza y sus Pelayeros. With Laza, Camacho sang on "Chicharrón Pelúo", "Avelina", "La Calle", "La Negra", "Cayetano Baila", and "La Boquillera", among others. Camacho also sang with Michi Sarmiento, Nelson Herrera, and the orchestra of Rufo Garrido, and later led his own orchestra called Crescencio Camacho y sus Nuevos Pelayeros, until around 2012.

Camacho's notable compositions include "Tú no Vales Nada", "Compadrito", and "Falta la Plata". He was once invited to Cartagena by Joe Arroyo to record "Falta la Plata" together, but refused because of his fear of flying; Arroyo recorded the song with Víctor Meléndez instead.

=== Personal life and death ===
Camacho was married to Esther Vivanco, and together they had one son and six daughters. His cousin Nelson García Olivo was a musician, and studied at a conservatory in Panama.

Camacho died on 13 December 2014 in Cartagena, and was buried the next day in the cemetery Jardines de Cartagena.
