= Clímaco Sarmiento =

Colombian musician and songwriter

- Born: Clímaco Sarmiento Ávila; 10 March 1908; Soplaviento, Colombia
- Died: 31 January 1986 (aged 77) Cartagena, Colombia
- Children: Michi Sarmiento

Clímaco Sarmiento Ávila (Note: In this Spanish name, the first or paternal surname is Sarmiento and the second or maternal family name is Ávila.) (1908–1986) was a Colombian musician and songwriter. He played saxophone and clarinet in the orchestras of Lucho Bermúdez, Pedro Laza, and others, as well as leading his own. Sarmiento wrote numerous songs in a variety of Colombian styles, and was described by Peter Wade as being a central figure of mid-century Colombian coastal music, alongside Laza and Rufo Garrido.

== Biography ==
=== Early life ===
Sarmiento was born on 10 March 1908 in Soplaviento, in the Colombian department of Bolívar. His mother was Justina Ávila and his father was Pedro Sarmiento, a clarinetist. Sarmiento was the second of twelve children.

=== Music career ===
In the 1920s Sarmiento's family moved to Cartagena, where he was taught to play saxophone by a German called Vickmer. He wrote his first song "La Siria Libre" at the age of 15. Sarmiento joined the orchestra of Lucho Bermúdez, and then the Orquesta Emisora Fuentes, where he met the clarinetist and band director Juancho Esquivel, with whom he formed the band Los Trovadores de Barú in 1946. Sarmiento also played in the orchestras of Pedro Laza, Rufo Garrido, and Alex Tovar.

Sarmiento formed his own orchestra in 1959, with whom he released the album Estampas de Cartagena (1959) on Zeida (a subsidiary of Codiscos), and the albums Bombo y Maracas (1961) and Clímaco Sarmiento y su Orquesta (1962) on Discos Fuentes, as well as three others for the Venezuelan record label Fonograma. The orchestra recorded with singers including Tony Zúñiga, Teresita Rendón, Henry Castro, Nora Tatis, and Jairo Likasale.

=== Personal life and death ===
Sarmiento was married to Cristina Vega, and is the father of musician Michi Sarmiento. He disappeared on 31 January 1986 after going out to see friends, and was found dead the next day.

== Musical style and compositions ==
Sarmiento's first composition was "Siria Libre". His other notable compositions include the porros "El Conejo", "El Breu", "Negro No Te Vayas", "Juanchito", "El Zuñigazo", and "Tribu el Guanipas", the gaita "Conchita", and the guaracha "La Tembladera".
