= Juancho Vargas =

Colombian pianist and composer

- Born: Juan Roberto Vargas Schoonewolf; 11 June 1934; Barranquilla, Colombia
- Died: 26 July 2022 (aged 88) Medellín, Colombia
- Years active: 1952–2022
- Labels: Sonolux; Discos Fuentes; RCA; Codiscos; CBS

Juan Roberto Vargas Schoonewolf (1934–2022), known as Juancho Vargas, was a Colombian pianist and composer. He played with several bands and orchestras in Colombia, and was pianist on the first recording of "Ay Cosita Linda".

== Biography ==
Juancho Vargas was born on 11 June 1934 in Barranquilla. He started playing classical piano at a young age, and later studied at the Institute of Fine Arts in Barranquilla, where his teacher Pedro Biava encouraged him to learn popular music. Vargas graduated from the Institute in 1952 and started his musical career playing with the Emisora Atlántico orchestra.

In 1955 Vargas moved to Bogotá to study chemical engineering. There he met the brother of Lucho Bermúdez, who convinced him to move to Medellín to join Bermúdez's band, which Vargas did that same year. Vargas earned 800 pesos a month in the orchestra, who played three shows a night on the radio station La Voz de Antioquia. In July 1955 he played on the first recorded version of Pacho Galán's merecumbé "Ay Cosita Linda".

In 1957 Vargas left Bermúdez's orchestra and became artistic director of the record label Sonolux, where he led the Orquesta Sonolux and worked as an arranger alongside Luis Uribe Bueno, León Cardona, and Antonio María Peñaloza. He later worked as musical director at Codiscos (1967–69), Discos Fuentes (1969–71), and CBS Colombia (1979–80). While working for Sonolux, Vargas was asked by RCA Victor to record an album of cumbias, which became the 1965 album Cumbias Espaciales. This experience sparked Vargas' interest in jazz, a genre he explored on 1966's Colombian Brass. In 1967 he was hired by Discos Fuentes, where he recorded salsa with Michi Sarmiento, Fruko y sus Tesos, and Los Corraleros de Majagual, notably on their 1970 song "Mondongo" about the soup of the same name.

Vargas spent several years in the United States in the 1970s, where he studied at Berklee College of Music and played with Frank Sinatra. Later he started teaching music; in 1973–75 he worked at the Music Academy in Curaçao. Vargas formed the Big Band de Medellín with Luis, Jaime, and Ricardo Uribe in 1988. In 1999–2000 he recorded two albums for Discos Fuentes, and in 2012 recorded the songs "Cumbia Espacial" and "Noche de Amor" with Ondatrópica.

Vargas was director of the orchestra El Sueño del Maestro until his death on 26 July 2022 in Medellín.
