= Julio Torres Mayorga =

Colombian musician and songwriter

- Born: 27 March 1929; Bogotá, Colombia
- Died: 9 January 1951 (aged 21) Cartagena, Colombia
- Genres: Vallenato
- Years active: 1949–1951
- Labels: Vergara Records

Julio Torres Mayorga (Note: In this Spanish name, the first or paternal surname is Torres and the second or maternal family name is Mayorga.) (1929–1951) was a Colombian musician and songwriter. He founded Los Alegres Vallenatos, the first vallenato band from Bogotá, who were nationally successful for a brief time before Torres' death by drowning at the age of 21.

== Biography ==
=== Early life and education ===
Torres was born on 27 March 1929 in the Ricaurte neighbourhood of Bogotá. His parents were Julio Torres Parra (a pianist and relative of Sofía Álvarez) and Rosa María Mayorga.

Torres bought his first guitar from a friend at the age of 17. He studied music at the Centro de Cultura Social in Bogotá under José Vicente Chala and Oriol Rangel, where he began to write songs in traditional Colombian styles like bolero. He subsequently started composing in the coastal styles of porro, cumbia, and merengue.

=== Music career ===
In December 1949 Torres wrote the vallenato "Los Camarones" while on the bus, reading in the newspaper about beauty queen Myriam Sojo Sambrano, and listening to a song by Garzón y Collazos. He submitted the song to a competition run by the Nuevo Mundo radio station, where it won a prize of 500 pesos. Gregorio Vergara heard the song and hired Torres to record it as the first single on his new record label, Vergara Records. In June 1950 Torres recorded "Los Camarones" and "El Aguacero" (a song he wrote after being accidentally locked outside in the rain by his grandmother) in the studios of Nuevo Mundo; he was backed by Homo Morales (accordion), Custodio Morales (guitar), Eliseo Márquez (guitar), José Mejía (guacharaca), and Jorge Rojas (bongos). The group named themselves Los Alegres Vallenatos, possibly in reference to Guillermo Buitrago, whose guitar-driven vallenato music was becoming popular in Bogotá.

Vergara released the 78 record of "Los Camarones" and "El Aguacero" in September 1950. By December 1950 it had sold 300,000 copies and was the best-selling single of the year. The songs were played on national radio, and Los Alegres Vallenatos made plans to tour in Mexico in 1951. Torres signed an exclusive contract with Vergara and recorded twelve more songs with Los Alegres Vallenatos, two of which were accompanied by Tito Avila on vocals.

On 30 December 1950 Semana ran a piece on Torres, and published alongside it the only known photograph of Los Alegres Vallenatos. Colombian coastal music was at the time looked down upon by many in Bogotá, and the article signified changing opinions.

=== Death and legacy ===
The same day as the Semana article was published, Torres flew to Cartagena with his girlfriend (and daughter of Gregorio Vergara) Olga Vergara, and his bandmates. There, while swimming in the sea for the first time in his life, he drowned on 9 January 1951.

Torres never released an LP with Los Alegres Vallenatos; the first vallenato LP by a Bogotano band was Los Universitarios' 1962 debut. Peter Wade credits Los Alegres Vallenatos with helping to popularise vallenato in Bogotá, alongside Guillermo Buitrago and Julio Bovea. Julio Oñate Martínez has described Torres, Buitrago, and Diomedes Díaz as "the three greatest popular talents [Colombia] has ever produced."

== Notable compositions ==
Torres' notable compositions are "Los camarones" (the lyrics of which come from an existing bolero), "Pomponio", "La Colegiala", "La Tamborera", "Mi Aguinaldo", "Mi Primo el Ñato", "El Aguacero", "Cuando Aparece el Amor", and "La Lora de Don Facundo".
