= Luis Carlos Meyer =

Colombian singer and songwriter (1916–1998)

- Also known as: The King of Porro
- Born: Luis Mateo Meyer Castandent; 21 September 1916; Barranquilla, Colombia
- Died: 7 November 1998 (aged 82) New York, United States
- Years active: 1934–c.1990

Luis Mateo Meyer Castandent (Note: In this Spanish name, the first or paternal surname is Meyer and the second or maternal family name is Castandet.) (1916–1998), known as Luis Carlos Meyer, was a Colombian singer and songwriter. He is credited with helping to popularise the musical styles of cumbia and porro in the interior of Colombia and in North America. He sang with the orchestras of Francisco Cristancho Camargo, Rafael de Paz, and Xavier Cugat, and also led his own orchestras.

== Life and career ==
Luis Mateo Meyer Castandent was born on 21 September 1916 in Barranquilla, in the Colombian department of Atlántico. His mother Julia Castandet was from Martinique, and his father Isaac Meyer was from Trinidad. He started his music career in 1934, playing guitar and singing in bands in Barranquilla, including the Emisora Atlántico Jazz Band.

Meyer is credited with being one of the first artists to achieve success playing music from the Colombian Caribbean in the "interior" cities of Bogotá and Medellín. He moved to Bogotá in 1940, and lived there for three years, singing with the orchestras of Milcíades Garavito, Alberto Ahumada, and Francisco Cristancho Camargo. Meyer went to Medellín in 1943, where he sang with the orchestra led by Juan Manuel Valcárcel.

In 1945, Meyer left Colombia. He went to Panama and then to Cuba, where he performed on the radio with Bebo Valdés and his orchestra at the end of 1945. Meyer moved to Mexico in 1946, where he recorded with Rafael de Paz and the Orquesta Panamericana, and also with his own orchestra. Their recording of Meyer's song "Micaela" was a particular hit, and has been covered by singers including Pedro Infante and Ninón Sevilla. Meyer spent some time in Caracas in 1955, performing on TV and the radio, and then in 1956 went to New York. For the following three decades Meyer lived between Canada and New York, performing regularly and, according to El Tiempo, spending his money extravagantly. He led his own orchestra and also sung with Xavier Cugat and his band.

Meyer became unable to sing in the early 1990s, and because of that started to have financial problems. From 1992 he lived at the Laconia nursing home in the Bronx. In 1997, Meyer travelled to Barranquilla after being away for 45 years, and a concert was held in his honour. He was awarded the Order of Boyacá and the Gran Orden of the Colombian Ministry of Culture. He then returned to New York, where he died on 7 November 1998.

== Musical style and compositions ==
Meyer predominantly wrote songs in the styles of cumbia and porro. He is known as the "King of Porro" (Spanish: el Rey del Porro) because of his role in popularising the genre in Mexico. His notable compositions include "Micaela", "La Puerca", and "Trópico", which was recorded by la Sonora Matancera. Meyer also recorded many songs written by other composers from the Colombian Caribbean, including José Barros, José María Peñaranda, Rafael Escalona, and Rafael Campo Miranda. He sang on the first recording of "La Cumbia Cienaguera" by Andrés Paz Barros, Esteban Montaño, and Luis Enrique Martínez.
