= Alberto Fernández Mindiola =

Colombian singer and songwriter (born 1927)

- Also known as: Golden Voice of Vallenato
- Born: 7 April 1927 (age 99); Atanquez, Colombia
- Genres: vallenato

Alberto Fernández Mindiola (born 7 April 1927) is a Colombian singer, guacharaca player, and songwriter. Fernández is known as the "Golden Voice of Vallenato" (Spanish: La Voz de Oro del Vallenato). He was a founding member of Bovea y sus Vallenatos, and has performed with several Colombian musical groups in a decades-long career.

In 2015 El Espectador wrote that "Fernández's voice is as emblematic of the popular song of the Colombian Caribbean as those of Buitrago and Alejo Durán."

== Life and career ==
=== Early life and education ===
Fernández was born on 7 April 1927 in Atanquez, at that time in Magdalena and now in Cesar. His mother Beatriz Mindiola was born in Riohacha, where her father had moved from the Netherlands. His father Luis Fernández played the trumpet, the caja, and the bombo.

Fernández told El Espectador that he learned to sing and play guacharaca in childhood, and was influenced by musicians who came to Atanquez to play at the Feast of Saint Isidore the Laborer. He attended the Liceo Loperena in Valledupar alongside Rafael Escalona, and may have been the first to introduce Guillermo Buitrago to Escalona's compositions.

=== Career ===
In the early 1940s Fernández was a member of José María Peñaranda's orchestra. He joined Guillermo Buitrago's group in 1946, and that year made his first recordings with the Sonora Curro and with Don Américo y sus Caribes. In 1947 Fernández became a founding member of Bovea y sus Vallenatos, in which he sang and played guacharaca alongside Julio Bovea and Angel Fontanilla on lead and rhythm guitar respectively. He has also performed with the groups of Pacho Galán, Lucho Bermúdez, Celia Cruz, Alberto Pacheco, Edmundo Arias, Chico Cervantes, Gustavo Gutiérrez Cabello, Calixto Ochoa, and Aniceto Molina. In 1954 Fernández recorded the first version of Antonio María Peñaloza's song "Te Olvidé", which is often associated with the Barranquilla Carnival, allegedly because he happened to be in the recording studio when Tito Cortés, who was booked to record the vocals, failed to appear.

Fernández and the other members of Bovea y sus Vallenatos moved to Argentina in the 1950s and stayed there under exclusive contract with RCA Victor until 1969, when they broke up. Fernández returned to Bogotá and formed his own trio called Alberto Fernández y sus Auténticos Vallenatos, or simply Los Auténticos Vallenatos, alongside Angel Fontanilla. Fontanilla was later replaced by Otoniel Miranda.

Fernández is not particularly well known as a songwriter but he has recorded at least 40 of his own compositions, including "La Carta de Gracielita", "Contestación a la Casa en el Aire", "María Peralta", and "Adiós corazón".
