= Francisco el Hombre =

Legendary character of Colombian folklore

- Born: Colombia
- Known for: Colombian folklore character

Francisco el Hombre (Francisco the Man) is a legendary character of Colombian folklore. He is the archetype of a juglar (roughly translated, jester or minstrel), a traditional player of Vallenato, a traditional Colombian genre of music. It is generally acknowledged that the popularly known story of Francisco el Hombre contains elements of myth, as well as historical fact.

== Background ==
Vallenato is a very important part of the Colombian culture as a whole, but especially its region on the Caribbean Coast. It originated in the Valle de Upar (Valley of Upar), which is also the origin of the genre's name (Vallenato literally translates to 'Born in the Valley' Valle=Valley, Nato=Born). There are a couple of integral aspects to the traditions surrounding Vallenato that are also important for the legend of Francisco el Hombre. The first is the instruments traditional to the playing of Vallenato, especially the accordion. The second is the concept of the piqueria. A piqueria is a showdown between two juglares of Vallenato. They are freestyle competitions where the participating juglares battle over who has the better accordion-playing skills, as well as who can freestyle sing better verses challenging and insulting the other. The concept of a piqueria is somewhat comparable to the "rap battle" of American hip hop culture, except for the added component of playing the accordion while delivering verses. The famous song, La Gota Fría (The Cold Sweat) is a good example of a piqueria vallenata.

== The Legend ==
Legend has it that Francisco traveled throughout Colombia, going from town to town participating in piquerias, which he always emerged victorious from. One night, as he traveled, he pulled out his accordion and began playing some notes and singing to occupy himself as he walked. Suddenly, he realized that every tune he played was answered by a better one from afar. He spent several hours searching for his opponent in the darkness, to no avail. Suddenly, a ray of moonlight burst through the clouds and shone down on his adversary, revealing his identity: it was Satan himself. Upon revealing himself, the devil played a powerful song, so powerful that the light of the moon and stars were snuffed out, leaving his burning eyes as the only source of light in the night. Understanding that this would be his greatest battle, the juglar fell to his knees, looked up to heaven, signed the cross, and prayed the Apostles' Creed forwards and backwards. He then got up and played the most beautiful melody ever heard. The moon and stars returned to the sky. The devil let out an ear-piercing scream, and fled into the mountains, leaving Francisco as the winner of the duel, and bestowing upon him the moniker of el Hombre (the Man).

== The historical Francisco el Hombre ==
There is dispute over who (if anyone) the legend of Francisco el Hombre is based on, but it is generally accepted that it was either Francisco Moscote Guerra, or Francisco Rada Batista.

Francisco Moscote Guerra was a famous Vallenato player from the town of Plato in the administrative department of Magdalena. He is mentioned in the novel One Hundred Years of Solitude as "an old globe-trotter of almost 200 years who frequently passed by Macondo divulging the songs composed by himself". The Colombian Ministry of Culture considers him the most probable candidate.

Francisco Rada Batista, also known as "Pancho Rada," (1907–2003) is also proposed as the legendary figure. He was certainly a legendary Vallenato artist. He is credited with revolutionizing the genre throughout his life, and is also credited with inventing the Vallenato subgenre known as son. The 2000 documentary film The Devil's Accordion asserts that he is the namesake of the legendary figure.

Regardless of who his true identity may have been, his image has deeply permeated throughout Colombia. The world's largest Vallenato festival, held in the genre's birthplace of Valledupar is called Festival de la Leyenda Vallenata (Festival of the Vallenato Legend). Another large Colombian music Festival is simply called, Festival Francisco el Hombre. Many images, statues, and sculptures of him can also be found over the country.
