= Juan Vargas (disambiguation) =

Juan Vargas (born 1961) is an American politician.

Juan Vargas may also refer to:

- Juan Vargas Aruquipa (born 1947), Bolivian prelate of the Roman Catholic Church
- Juan Vargas Puebla (1908–1992), Chilean trade-union leader and politician
- Juan Vargas (judoka) (born 1963), Salvadoran judoka
- Juan Camilo Vargas (born 1994), Colombian squash player
- Juan Manuel Vargas (born 1983), football (soccer) player from Peru
- Juancho Vargas (Juan Roberto Vargas Schoonewolf, 1934–2022), Colombian pianist and composer
- Tetelo Vargas (Juan Esteban Vargas, 1906–1971), baseball player from the Dominican Republic
