= Michi Sarmiento =

Colombian saxophonist and bandleader (1938–2021)

- Also known as: Precursor de la salsa en Colombia
- Born: Blas Sarmiento Marimón; 1 November 1938; Labarcés, San Onofre, Colombia
- Died: 26 November 2021 (aged 83) Cartagena, Colombia
- Family: Clímaco Sarmiento (father)

Blas Sarmiento Marimón (Note: In this Spanish name, the first or paternal surname is Sarmiento and the second or maternal family name is Marimón.) (1938–2021), known as Michi Sarmiento, was a Colombian saxophonist, singer, songwriter, bandleader, and arranger. His band Michi y su Combo Bravo released nine LPs on Discos Fuentes in the 1960s and 70s, and are considered pioneers of salsa in Colombia.

== Biography ==
Blas Sarmiento Marimón was born on 1 November 1938 in Labarcés, (Note: Also called La Barces.) San Onofre, in the Colombian department of Sucre. His father Clímaco Sarmiento, grandfather Pedro Sarmiento, and great-grandfather Manuel Sarmiento were all musicians. His mother Clara Marimón was a bullerengue singer, as was her mother, and his maternal uncles were drummers. Sarmiento's aunt nicknamed him Michi as a baby, because of a perceived resemblance to a piglet of the same name.

Sarmiento grew up in Soplaviento, in the Colombian department of Bolívar. At the age of 14 he started attending the Instituto Musical de Cartagena, attached to the Bolívar School of Fine Arts, where he was taught by Adolfo Mejía Navarro. He learned piano, saxophone, clarinet, drums, and singing.

In the mid-1960s, Sarmiento moved to Cartagena. There he played in several orchestras, including those led by Pedro Laza, Rufo Garrido, Andrés Morales, and his father Clímaco, as well as Delia Zapata Olivella's Ballet Folclórico and los Corraleros de Majagual. He also worked with Pacho Galán, Lisandro Meza, and Alfredo Gutiérrez. Sarmiento also led his own orchestras, initially Michi y sus Matuyeros, and from 1967 Michi y su Combo Bravo. Michi y su Combo Bravo released nine albums on Medellín record label Discos Fuentes. They are considered pioneers of salsa in Colombia.

Sarmiento also worked as an arranger. He arranged (and played saxophone) on Joe Arroyo's hit song "La Rebelión". Beginning in the 1990s, he worked as a music teacher in Soplaviento. In 2012, he played on Ondatrópica's self-titled debut album.

Sarmiento died on 26 November 2021 in hospital in Cartagena.

== Albums with Michi y su Combo Bravo ==
- Los Bravos (1969, Discos Fuentes)
- Tremendo (1969, Discos Fuentes)
- ¡Salsa Picante! (1970, Discos Fuentes)
- Cum Cumbele (1970, Discos Fuentes)
- Anacaona (1972, Discos Fuentes)
- El Forastero (1973, Discos Fuentes)
- Salsa con Monte (1973, Discos Fuentes)
- La Salsa de Michi (1975, Discos Fuentes)
- El Taconazo (1983, Codiscos)

=== Compilations ===
- ¡Aquí los Bravos! (2011, Soundway)
