= Francisco Rada =

Colombian accordionist and songwriter

- Also known as: Pacho Rada; El padre del son
- Born: Francisco Manuel Rada Batista; 11 May 1907; Ariguaní, Colombia
- Died: 17 July 2003 (aged 96) Santa Marta, Colombia
- Genres: vallenato

Francisco Manuel Rada Batista (1907–2003), known as Pacho Rada, was a Colombian accordionist and songwriter. In 1998 he was given the title "King for life" at the Vallenato Legend Festival.

== Biography ==
Rada was born on 11 May 1907 in Ariguaní, Magdalena, to Alberto Constantino Rada Ballesta and María Gregoria Batista Villarreal. His parents were from Plato, and his father was an accordionist.

By some accounts, Rada was already showing ability on the accordion at the age of 4. Rada claimed to have surprised his father by perfectly playing the merengue "El Cometa" to him on his own accordion at the age of 8. Rada is one of the alleged inspirations for the legend of Francisco el Hombre, a nickname he says was given as a child because of his advanced musical ability.

In 1998 the Vallenato Legend Festival named Rada "King for life" (Spanish: Rey vitalicio), alongside Andrés Landero, Antonio Salas, Abel Antonio Villa and Lorenzo Morales. His son Alberto Rada won the accordionist competition of the Festival in 1993.

Rada had between 9 and 12 children, with four women: Hipólita Alvarado, Blanca Ortiz, María Ospina, and Manuela Oviedo. El Tiempo wrote that on his death Rada had over 300 descendants, including 6 great-great-great-grandchildren. Rada was married for the final time aged 93, but the marriage did not last long and he was living with his daughter Pabla Rada Oviedo in Santa Marta when he died on 17 July 2003.

== Musical style and compositions ==
Rada was a composer of vallenato, and is particularly known for his compositions in the genre of son vallenato, which earned him the nickname "El padre del son" (Spanish for "the father of the son"). His notable compositions include "La Lira Plateña", "Cipote Luto", "Sinforoso Fernández", "El Tigre de la Montaña", "El Botón de Oro", "Abraham con la Botella", "La Ñatica", "El Chupaflor", "Levántate María", and "La Puerca".

José Pinilla Aguilar described Rada's songs as "authentically typical pieces, whose verses capture the daily life and the myths of the inhabitants of the northern coast of [Colombia]."
