= Pello Torres =

Colombian trumpeter and songwriter

- Born: Pedro Manuel Torres Arroyo; 22 October 1924; Calamar, Colombia
- Died: 9 March 2008 (aged 83) Sincelejo, Colombia

Pedro Manuel Torres Arroyo (Note: In this Spanish name, the first or paternal surname is Torres and the second or maternal family name is Arroyo.) (Note: Torres' name has also been reported as Pedro Arturo Torres.) (1924–2008), known as Pello Torres or Peyo Torres, was a Colombian trumpeter and songwriter. Torres wrote "El Culebro", which played an important role in the development of porro as a commercially successful genre in Colombia, and he founded and led the band Los Diablos del Ritmo.

== Biography ==
=== Early life ===
Pedro Manuel Torres Arroyo was born in Barranca Nueva, in Calamar in the Colombian department of Bolívar. Torres started learning cornet and trumpet very young, and played in a band in his hometown before moving to Barranquilla at the age of 13. There he wanted, but was unable, to study under Pedro Biava; instead he worked as a bricklayer. When an accident at work led him to lose his job, he decided to pursue music.

=== Music career ===
In Barranquilla, Torres met Jorge Rafael Acosta, the uncle of Lucho Bermúdez, who got Torres working as a musician on boat tours between Barranquilla and Honda. When Acosta became conductor of the Orquesta Granadina in Sincelejo in 1949, he hired Torres on trumpet.

When the Orquesta Granadina dissolved after several years, Torres formed his own band with some other members of the orchestra. In 1954 Torres and his band performed "Belia Primera", a song written by Torres about a beauty queen, for Toño Fuentes of Discos Fuentes. Fuentes renamed the song "El Culebro" after a fighting cock, and renamed Torres' group to Orquesta Ritmos de Sabana; they recorded the song as a single, with "Cógeme la Caña" by Néstor Montes on the B-side, and it was an immediate hit.

Torres left Discos Fuentes, who moved onto developing the porro sound with Pedro Laza y sus Pelayeros. At the invitation of Pedro Salcedo, Torres joined his orchestra in Barrancabermeja, where they played jazz for the Americans working in the oil refinery.

After several years Torres returned to Sincelejo, where he formed another band called the Diablos del Ritmo. Torres and the Diablos del Ritmo released 6 LPs on labels Sonolux, Philips, Discos Tropical, and Discos Fuentes.

=== Death ===
Torres died on 9 March 2008 in his home in Sincelejo, several days after being hit by a motorbike on the street.

== Musical style and compositions ==
Torres wrote several hundred songs in styles including porro, fandango, mapalé, merecumbé, and salsa. His song "El Culebro", which he recorded for Discos Fuentes in 1954, convinced Antonio Fuentes of the commercial potential of porro, and led him to hire Pedro Laza and his band. Some of Torres' compositions, like the chandé "El Zaino", take influence from the drum-driven music of Magdalena River communities. Torres recorded many of his compositions with the Diablos del Ritmo, including notably "Vilma Isabel", "Pedro Juan Tulena", "Don Horacio", "Jarrete Tieso", "En Punto E' Coca", "Tus Ojitos", "Ay Hombe", "Merecumbé en Batería", "Suavecito", "Jalajalaíto", and "Jalaitononón".
