= Carlos Román Sulbarán =

Colombian musician and songwriter

- Also known as: Gran Romancito
- Born: July 1919; Cartagena, Colombia
- Died: 12 April 1973 (aged 53) Barranquilla, Colombia

Carlos Román Sulbarán (Note: In this Spanish name, the first or paternal surname is Román and the second or maternal family name is Sulbarán.) (1919–1973) was a Colombian musician and songwriter. Román founded the group Los Vallenatos del Magdalena with Aníbal Velásquez, and sang on the first recording of "Very Very Well" in 1958, which was the first rock and roll song recorded in Colombia, and was very successful.

== Biography ==
=== Early life ===
Carlos Román Sulbarán was born in Cartagena, capital of the Colombian department of Bolívar, in July 1919. As a young man he worked as a policeman. Jaime Andrés Monsalve wrote that this "left him with a kind of authoritarianism that made him difficult to deal with." Román had a reputation for having a short temper, and later for smashing guitars in fits of rage.

=== Music career ===
In the 1950s Román moved with his brother Roberto Román to Barranquilla. Together with brothers Juan and Aníbal Velásquez they formed the group Los Vallenatos del Magdalena, which recorded around 40 songs, including a version of "Alicia la Campesina" by Andrés Landero in 1951, and the first recorded version of Rafael Escalona's "La Casa en el Aire" in 1952. The name of the group was inspired by Julio Torres Mayorga's short-lived band Los Alegres Vallenatos. In 1955 Roberto died and the group disbanded.

Román then began working with accordionist Morgan Blanco. Together they formed the bands Sonora Vallenata and Los Raspacanilla de Carrizal, which also included Rosendo Martínez, Nicolás Ortiz, and Jorge Viana. Backed by the Sonora Vallenata, Román recorded the single "Very Very Well" in 1958, a rock and roll song written by Antonio Fuentes which was hugely successful. Román could never replicate the success of "Very Very Well", though he tried recording other songs in mangled English in various styles, including the romanchá style of his own invention. Some songs written by Román were recorded successfully by others, including "Ni Cuerpo, Ni Corazón" by Rodolfo Aicardi with Los Hispanos, "Cumbia Negra" by Lisandro Meza, and "El Desfile" by Moisés Angulo.

=== Death ===
Román died in hospital in Barranquilla on 12 April 1973. His cause of death was initially reported as tuberculosis, but it was later established that he died due to complications of a tooth removal.
