= La Casa en el Aire =

Song
- Genre: Vallenato
- Songwriter: Rafael Escalona

"La Casa en el Aire" (translation "the house in the air") is a Colombian vallenato song written and performed by Rafael Escalona.

In its list of the 50 best Colombian songs of all time, El Tiempo, Colombia's most widely circulated newspaper, ranked the versions of the song by Bovea y sus Vallenatos at No. 11. Viva Music Colombia rated the song No. 9 on its list of the 100 most important Colombian songs of all time.

The first recorded version of "La Casa en el Aire" was by Carlos Román and Aníbal Velásquez's Los Vallenatos del Magdalena in 1958. Since then the song has been recorded by multiple artists, including Bovea y Sus Vallenatos, Carlos Vives, Lola Flores, Roberto Torres, Piper Pimienta y Su Orquesta, Trio La Rosa, Ricardo Torres, Rosario, Gabriel Romero y Su Seleccion Colombia, Don Medardo y sus Players, Los Cañaguateros & Aníbal Velásquez, Catalino Y Su Conjunto, Las Emes, Carmiña Gallo, and Jaime Llano González Su Organo Y Rítmos.
