= Francisco Cristancho Hernández =

Colombian musician and composer

- Born: 18 February 1941; Bogotá, Colombia
- Died: 5 May 2023 (aged 82) Bogotá, Colombia
- Instruments: cello; piano; trumpet

Francisco Cristancho Hernández (Note: In this Spanish name, the first or paternal surname is Cristancho and the second or maternal family name is Hernández.) (1941–2023) was a Colombian musician and composer. He directed several orchestras including the Orquesta Colombiana, and taught music at various conservatories and universities in Colombia.

== Biography ==
=== Early life and education ===
Cristancho was born on 18 February 1941 in Bogotá, to Francisco Cristancho Camargo and Sofía Hernández. His father was a composer, trombonist, and guitarist, who led his own orchestra. When Francisco Jr. was 7 years old, his father took the family on a musical tour of South America that included Brazil, Venezuela, Curaçao, and Trinidad.

Cristancho went to school in Bogotá, learned to play cello from Ludwig Matzenauer, and was taught piano by Lucia Pérez at the music conservatory of the National University of Colombia. He also learned trumpet, which he later played in his father's orchestra for nine years.

=== Music career ===
In 1958 Cristancho had his debut performance as a part of his father's orchestra for RCN Radio. For eight years, he was a cellist with the Colombian Symphony Orchestra, where his brother Mauricio Cristancho Hernández was a violinist.

Cristancho was a member of the orchestra of Luis Biava, and he directed the Boyacá Symphonic Band, the departmental band of Tolima, and the Bogotá Symphonic Band. He played with Blas Emilio Atehortúa's orchestra, and when Atehortúa retired in 1971, Cristancho took over leadership and renamed it the Orquesta Colombiana.

Cristancho composed 40 pieces of his own, and arranged hundreds more. He recorded 12 LPs, including Bambuco (his first commercial success) and Guatavita.

=== Teaching career ===
As a young man Cristancho taught at a music school in Tunja. He later taught music at the Escuela Superior de Administración Pública, the National University of Colombia, and the Pedagogical and Technological University of Colombia. He also taught at the Centro de Orientación Musical Francisco Cristancho Camargo, which he founded with his brother Mauricio.

El Espectador wrote that "under his tutelage, more than four generations of musicians have been trained, including drummer Germán Sandoval, bassist and composer Juan Carlos Padilla, pianists William Maestre, Orlando Sandoval, Ricardo Uribe and Fabio Martínez, and singer and guitarist Ana María González".

=== Personal life and death ===
Cristancho lived with his wife in Anapoima. He died on 5 May 2023 in Bogotá.
