= Abel Antonio Villa =

Colombian accordionist and songwriter

- Also known as: Padre del acordeón
- Born: Abel Antonio Villa Villa; 1 October 1924; Tenerife, Colombia
- Died: 10 June 2006 (aged 81) Barranquilla, Colombia
- Genre: vallenato
- Spouse: Débora Cañas
- Children: 11

Abel Antonio Villa Villa (1924–2006) was a Colombian accordionist and songwriter. He appeared on the first commercial vallenato record in 1944, and wrote more than 500 songs in a decades-long career. In 1998 he was given the title "King for life" at the Festival de la Leyenda Vallenata.

== Biography ==
Abel Antonio Villa was born on 1 October 1924 in Tenerife in the department of Magdalena, Colombia, to Antonio Villa Salas and María del Tránsito Villa Barrio. He had 10 siblings.

Villa began learning to play the accordion at the age of nine after hearing Gilberto Bermúdez perform and was later taught by Pacho Rada. He formed his first band together with his brother Fabián, Julio Bovea, and Virgilio Riasco.

In 1944, Villa participated in the recording of what is considered the first commercial vallenato record, "Las Cosas de las Mujeres", alongside Ezequiel Rodríguez, Guillermo Buitrago, and his brother Fabián. The recording was released by Odeon Records, and distributed in Chile and Argentina. He later signed to Discos Fuentes, where he released his first LP in 1947; by 1979 he had released 22 LPs and more than 500 singles.

Villa competed only once in the accordionist competition of the Festival de la Leyenda Vallenata, and did not win. In 1998 he was given the title "King for life" (Spanish: Rey vitalicio) by the festival, alongside Andrés Landero, Antonio Salas, Pacho Rada, and Lorenzo Morales.

Villa was married to Débora Cañas, and had 11 children. He died on 10 June 2006 in Barranquilla.

== Musical style and compositions ==
Villa wrote over 500 songs in the vallenato rhythms of paseo, merengue, and puya, as well as cumbias. His best-known composition is "El Higuerón", which was popularised by Binomio de Oro. Other notable compositions by Villa are "Mi Candelaria", "Zoila", and "Amalia Vergara".

=== "La Muerte de Abel Antonio" ===
In 1943, when returning home from military service, Villa stopped to play accordion in various towns in Magdalena. He was in El Banco when a man called Abel Antonio Fernández, who looked like Villa, died. The news that "Abel Antonio has died" got back to his family in Piedras de Moler; his father telegrammed the mayor of El Banco, who confirmed his death. Five days into the wake, Villa appeared. From that time on he exclusively dressed in white, and he wrote the song "La Muerte de Abel Antonio" (The death of Abel Antonio) about the experience, which has been recorded by several artists including Alfredo Gutiérrez and Binomio de Oro.
