= Plato Airport =

Plato Airport Las Flores Airport
- IATA: PLT; ICAO: SKPL

Summary
- Airport type: Public
- Serves: Plato, Colombia
- Elevation AMSL: 69 ft / 21 m
- Coordinates: 9°48′00″N 74°47′10″W

Map
- Location of the airport in Colombia

Runways
Direction	Length		Surface
Direction	m	ft	Surface
18/36	1,100	3,609	Dirt
- Source: GCM Google Maps

Plato Airport (IATA: PLT, ICAO: SKPL) is an airport serving the town of Plato in the Magdalena Department of Colombia. The runway is adjacent to the northwest side of the town.

== See also ==
- Transport in Colombia
- List of airports in Colombia
