= Pedro Laza =

Colombian musician and bandleader

- Born: Pedro Ignacio Laza Gutiérrez; 2 December 1904; Cartagena, Colombia
- Died: 4 April 1980 or 1988 (aged 75 or 83) Cartagena, Colombia
- Years active: 1920s–1980
- Label: Discos Fuentes

Pedro Ignacio Laza Gutiérrez (Note: In this Spanish name, the first or paternal surname is Laza and the second or maternal family name is Gutiérrez.) (1904–1980 or 1988) was a Colombian musician and bandleader. He founded and led the orchestra Pedro Laza y sus Pelayeros, who were popular in the 1960s and released more than 30 LPs on record label Discos Fuentes.

== Biography ==
=== Early life and education ===
Laza was born on 2 December 1904 in Cartagena, capital of the Colombian department of Bolívar. He studied at the University of Cartagena.

=== Early music career ===
Laza's father did not want him to be a musician, but as a young man he built a bandurria and learned to play from his neighbour Abraham del Valle. He played the instrument in his first band, a string trio formed in secret with Antonio Conde on tiple and Fernando Barrios on guitar. In 1932 Laza expanded the trio to 7 members and renamed it the Estudiantina Bolívar, which lasted until 1936.

In 1936 Laza formed the band La Nueva Granada, and with them recorded El Aguacate, his first record on Discos Fuentes. Inspired by Francisco Lorduy, founder and leader of the Jazz Band Lorduy, Laza changed instruments to double bass, which he played with La Nueva Granada until the group disbanded in 1940. Following the dissolution of La Nueva Granada, Laza spent some time playing with the Orquesta Emisora Fuentes.

=== Pedro Laza y sus Pelayeros ===
In 1952 Laza founded the Orquesta de Pedro Laza, which was later renamed Pedro Laza y sus Pelayeros. The band was named for San Pelayo in the Colombian department of Córdoba, which was famed for performers of porro and fandango; none of the band members came from San Pelayo. The group became very popular in Colombia and recorded more than 30 LPs for Medellín record label Discos Fuentes. Other members of the Pelayeros included, at various times:

- Ladislao "Lalo" Orozco (piano)
- Clímaco Sarmiento (clarinet and alto saxophone)
- Leopoldo Cogollo (clarinet)
- Rufo Garrido (tenor saxophone)
- Nicolás de Ávila (saxophone)
- Ángel Mato (trumpet)
- Manuel García "El Tíbiri" Barcasnegra (trumpet)
- Carlos Morales (trumpet)
- Remberto "El Pollo" Sotomayor (trumpet)
- Edrulfo Polo Medina (trumpet)
- Otoniel Agudelo (trombone)
- Fidel Ortiz (percussion)
- Aniceto Franco (percussion)
- José Manuel Franco (percussion)
- Crescencio Camacho (vocals)
- Eustaquio Amín Pérez (vocals)
- Carlos "El Fulo" Gómez (vocals)
- Tony Zúñiga (vocals)

The Pelayeros' first single was the 78 record "Cariseco" (a porro, with the mapalé "El Cebú" as B-side, both written by Rufo Garrido). Their first LP was Candela (1958), a collection of previously released singles featuring vocals by Daniel Santos; their 1960 record Navidad Negra was the first LP to have stereophonic sound in Colombia. So many songs were recorded in the sessions for Navidad Negra that the Pelayeros released three more LPs comprising them in 1961: Rito Esclavo, Esperma y Ron, and Percusión Colombiana. The group continued to release records on Discos Fuentes until they disbanded in around 1973. Some of their records were attributed to Pedro Laza y su Banda, and several prominently featured a woman at the centre of the album cover, posing with brass instruments.

=== Later career and death ===
Laza released his final album Llegaron las Fiestas in 1980. He died in Cartagena on 4 April in either 1980 or 1988.

== Musical style and notable recordings ==
According to Jaime Monsalve Buriticá, the sound of Pedro Laza y sus Pelayeros had its roots in the 1954 porro "El Culebro" by Pello Torres and the Orquesta Ritmos de Sabanas. Peter Wade commented on the band's "ability to combine numbers in a smooth orchestral style...with others—often composed by Garrido or Sarmiento—that had a rather rougher, more gutsy sound that evoked much more immediately the local wind bands of the savannah of Bolívar". In an article for Radio Nacional de Colombia, Luis Daniel Vega wrote that "unlike the elegant and sophisticated sound of the orchestras of Lucho Bermúdez, Pacho Galán, and Edmundo Arias, Pedro Laza y sus Pelayeros were thunderous and visceral."

Songs notably recorded by Pedro Laza y sus Pelayeros include "Cumbia del Monte", "Navidad Negra", "Baranoa", "Rito Esclavo", "La Batea", and "El Güiro".
