= Julio Bovea =

Colombian musician

- Born: Julio César Bovea Fandiño; 6 or 8 September 1934; Santa Marta, Colombia
- Died: 11 September 2009 (aged 75) Bogotá, Colombia
- Genres: vallenato, paseo
- Years active: 1940s–2009

Julio César Bovea Fandiño (1934–2009) was a Colombian musician and songwriter. As the leader of the musical trio Bovea y sus Vallenatos, he played an important role in the development and popularisation of the Colombian folk music genre of vallenato, particularly his interpretations of compositions by Rafael Escalona.

== Biography ==
=== Early life and education ===
Julio Bovea was born in Santa Marta, Colombia, on either 6 or 8 September 1934. His father was Julio Bovea, a composer, tiplista, guitarist, and stringed instrument maker; his mother was Josefina Fandiño. Bovea left high school after only one year, due to the death of his father. Before beginning his career in music, Bovea worked as a barber.

=== Music career ===
Bovea initially played guitar in the ensembles of Guillermo Buitrago and Abel Antonio Villa, among others. In August 1947, at the age of 12, he formed his own musical trio, initially called Trío Magdalena and later renamed Bovea y sus Vallenatos. Bovea played lead guitar and sang alongside Alberto Fernández Mindiola, who played guacharaca and provided lead vocals, and Ángel Fontanilla, who played rhythm guitar and provided backing vocals. Bovea y sus Vallenatos played a role in the development and popularisation of the Colombian musical genre of vallenato and were among the first groups to record for Discos Tropical. Ignacio Castro Contreras described the trio's characteristic style as follows:

Un punteo en guitarra al inicio de la canción, con bastantes trinos y trémolos haciendo la frase melódica principal y cuya ejecución corre a cargo del propio Julio Bovea, luego la voz de Alberto Fernández, con las estrofas de la canción, el estribillo a tres voces, repetición de la frase melódica con la guitarra y estribillo final.

A guitar plucking at the beginning of the song, with many trills and tremolos making the main melodic phrase, executed by Julio Bovea himself, followed by the voice of Alberto Fernández, with the verses of the song, the chorus in three voices, repetition of the melodic phrase on the guitar, and the final chorus.

Bovea y sus Vallenatos are particularly known for their recordings of the compositions of Rafael Escalona, including "La Casa en el Aire". Their 1962 album Cantos Vallenatos de Escalona was the first collection of Escalona's compositions, and was successful in Bogotá, where vallento was at the time poorly received. Bovea also recorded and popularised several songs written by Rafael Campo Miranda. Bovea's own compositions include "La Mujer Celosa", "El Montañero", and "El Tigre Guapo".

In the 1950s Bovea y sus Vallenatos toured Argentina and were so well received that they decided to stay. Fernández and Fontanilla returned to Colombia in 1969, and Bovea formed a new group that released several albums with RCA Victor. Later Bovea also returned to Colombia, where he continued to perform until his death on 11 September 2009.

== Albums with Bovea y sus Vallenatos ==
- Merengues Colombianos (1957, Discos Fuentes)
- Los Cantos Vallenatos de Escalona (1962, Tropical)
