= San Estanislao, Bolívar =

San Estanislao
- Municipality and town
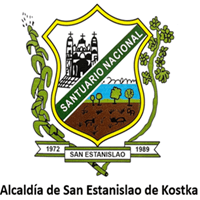
- Flag Coat of arms

- Location of the municipality and town of San Estanislao, Bolívar in the Bolívar Department of Colombia
- Coordinates: 10°24′N 75°09′W
- Country: Colombia
- Department: Bolívar Department
- Named for: Stanislaus Kostka

Area
  - Total: 208 km^{2} (80 sq mi)

Population (Census 2018)
  - Total: 16,518
  - Density: 79.4/km^{2} (206/sq mi)
- Time zone: UTC-5 (Colombia Standard Time)

San Estanislao is a town and municipality located in the Bolívar Department, northern Colombia.

San Estanislao is also informally known as Arenal by the locals, Arenal is Spanish for "sand", which earned its nickname in result that the town accumulates high amounts of sand during rain and wind. A mission was established on the present site in 1650. Access to the town can be challenging as the roads that access the town are unpaved and often water-logged after long periods of rain. Inhabitants of San Estanislao generally support themselves through family farms yielding a variety of produce and meat products, which are they often trade amongst themselves.

== Location ==
San Estanislao is located alongside the northeastern side of the Dique Canal 16 meters (55 feet) above sea level. Nearest major metropolitan municipalities are Barranquilla to the north by northeast, and Cartagena to the west. The town of Soplaviento is located across the canal from San Estanislao.

== Climate ==
The average temperature is approximately 35.0'C (95.0'F) during the day, 23.9'C (75.0'F) at night, and is generally the same most of the calendar year.
