= Rufo Garrido =

Colombian saxophonist, songwriter, and bandleader

- Also known as: El músico más alegre de Colombia; El saxo endiabla'o
- Born: Rufo Manuel Garrido Gamarra; 14 November 1896; Cartagena, Colombia
- Died: 3 November 1980 (aged 83) Cartagena, Colombia
- Genre: Tropical music

Rufo Manuel Garrido Gamarra (Note: In this Spanish name, the first or paternal surname is Garrido and the second or maternal family name is Gamarra.) (1896–1980) was a Colombian saxophonist, songwriter, and bandleader. He led his own orchestra and also played saxophone in groups including Pedro Laza y sus Pelayeros, the Sonora Cordobesa, and the orchestra Ondas del Sinú. Peter Wade described him as a central figure of mid-century Colombian costeño music, alongside Pedro Laza and Clímaco Sarmiento.

== Biography ==
Rufo Manuel Garrido Gamarra was born on 14 November 1896 in Cartagena, in the Colombian department of Bolívar. His father was Víctor Manuel Garrido, a baker. As a child Garrido attended a Salesian school, and learned to play ocarina.

Garrido's first job as a musician was in Sincelejo in the orchestra of Charles Butler, a saxophonist from San Andrés. In the 1930s Garrido played in saxophone in several groups in the Colombian Caribbean, including the Sonora Cordobesa and Ondas del Sinú. In 1952 he founded his own orchestra, which he led on saxophone and which included as members:

- Ladislao "Lalo" Orozco (piano)
- Manuel Villanueva (trumpet)
- Sabas Pacheco (trumpet)
- Rosendo Martínez (euphonium)
- Nicolás de Ávila (saxophone)
- Hernando Mendoza (saxophone)
- Cristóbal "Calilla" García (bass)
- Clodomiro Montes (percussion)
- Crescencio Camacho (vocals)
- Mariana Burgos (vocals)
- Isidro "El Pibe" Velasco (vocals)
- Tony Zúñiga (vocals)
- Eliseo Herrera (vocals)

Garrido also played saxophone with Pedro Laza y sus Pelayeros, the Cartagena orchestra led by Pedro Laza. He wrote around 100 songs in the styles of cumbia and porro, including notably "El Cebú", "El Cariseco", "La Palenquerita", "El Buscapié", "El Mochilero", and "Sin Breque".

Garrido's son Abraham is a saxophonist and bandleader and is known professionally as Rufo Garrido Jr. Garrido died on 3 November 1980 in Cartagena.
