= Rafael Campo Miranda =

Colombian songwriter and musician (1918–2024)

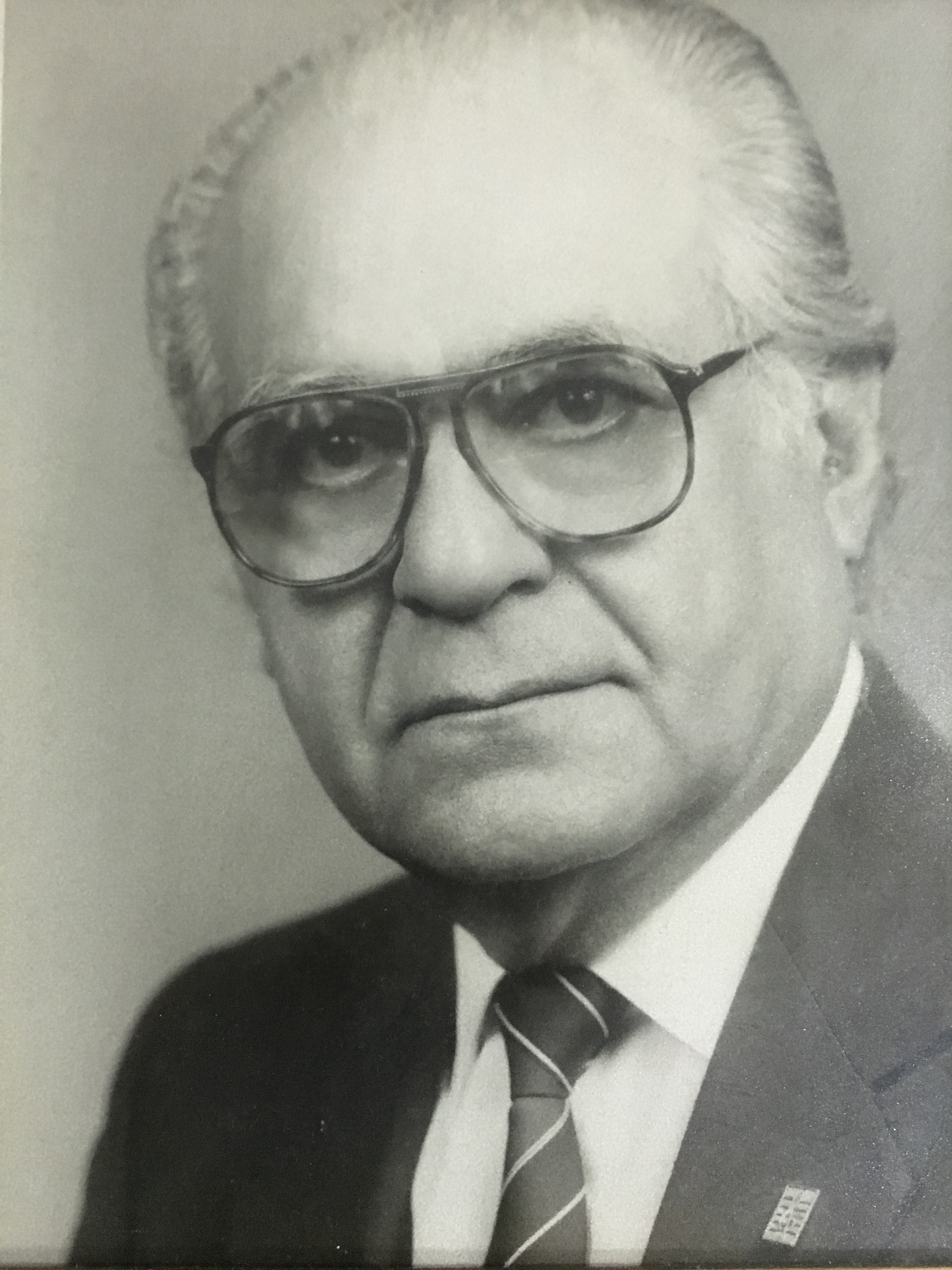

Background information
- Born: 7 August 1918; Soledad, Colombia
- Died: 15 June 2024 (aged 105) Barranquilla, Colombia
- Spouse: María del Socorro Vives Trespalacios
- Children: 3

Rafael Campo Miranda (1918–2024) was a Colombian songwriter and musician. His songs have been recorded by several prominent Latin American artists, including La Sonora Matancera and Pastor López. In 2022, Campo Miranda was awarded the Colombian Ministry of Culture's Premio Nacional Vida y Obra in the category of arts and culture.

== Biography ==
Rafael Campo Miranda was born on 7 August 1918 in Soledad in the Colombian department of Atlántico. His parents were Juan Bernardo Campo Serrano López and Cándida Miranda Robles. Around 1930 the family moved to the departmental capital, Barranquilla.

In Barranquilla, Campo Miranda studied at the Colegio Barranquilla and at the School of Fine Arts, and was taught by Pedro Biava at his music conservatory, which was attached to the University of Atlántico. He also learned classical guitar from Calixto González, cello from Guido Perla, and composition with Adolfo Mejía Navarro.

Campo Miranda worked white-collar jobs for most of his life, and composed music in his free time. In 1953, Radio Caracas Televisión and the record label Discomoda invited him to Venezuela, where he recorded several programmes for the radio. In 1965, Campo Miranda founded a music school, which is now run by his son.

Campo Miranda was still composing music as a centenarian in 2022. He died from complications due to pneumonia on 15 June 2024.

=== Personal life ===
In April 1951 Campo Miranda married María del Socorro Vives Trespalacios. The couple had three children: Marta, Margarita, and Rafael. He was good friends with bandleader Pacho Galán.

== Awards and recognition ==
- Named "illustrious citizen of Colombia" (Spanish: ciudadano ilustre de Colombia) by the President of Colombia, Misael Pastrana Borrero.
- Honor al Mérito medal, awarded by the Sociedad de Mejoras Públicas de Barranquilla.
- Medal of Artistic Merit, awarded by the Mayor of Barranquilla.
- National Music Award, awarded by the Colombian Ministry of Culture.
- Premio Nacional Vida y Obra (2022) in the category of arts and culture, awarded by the Colombian Ministry of Culture. The jury described his work as having "undeniable and evident impact on Colombian culture."

== Musical style and notable compositions ==
Campo Miranda's compositions have been recorded by artists including La Sonora Matancera, Billo's Caracas Boys, Lucho Bermúdez, Pacho Galán, Nelson Pinedo, Pastor López, Alejo Durán, and Alci Acosta. He composed in a wide range of styles, and his notable compositions include:

- Boleros: "Humo Que Quema", "Loca Obsesión", "Refugio", "Bajo Otro Cielo", "Apartamento", "Tatuaje"
- Cumbias: "Cumbia Celeste", "Hombre de Mar", "Playa, Brisa y Mar"
- Merengues–fandangos: "La Cometa", "Nube Viajera", "Pájaro Amarillo", "Uno Para Todos"
- Paseos: "Bajo el Ceibal", "Brisas del Valle", "Llano Verde", "Sin Rumbo"
- Porros: "Alborada"; "El Embrujao", "El Totumal", "Entre Palmeras", "Lamento Naúfrago", "Mi Delirio", "Miramar", "Pasión Tropical", "Playa", "Remando", "Suspiro Sabanero", "Te Fuiste Paloma", "Viento Verde", "Volaron las Garzas"
- Other styles: "Brisas del Valle" (vallenato), "La Mojana", "El Pescador" (merecumbé), "Trópico" (porro-merecumbe)

=== "Lamento Náufrago" ===
"Lamento Náufrago" is considered one of Campo Miranda's best compositions. He described the song as "my masterpiece. It is the memory of a love that still throbs in my mind." The song was written about a Mexican woman called Adriana whom Campo Miranda met in Puerto Colombia; it was first recorded in 1956 by Juancho Esquivel's band with the title "Recuerdos Náufragos", and later by Chucho Sanoja.
