= Villanueva, Bolívar =

Coordinates: 10.4456°N 75.2761°W

- Municipality and town
- Flag Coat of arms

- Location of the municipality and town of Villanueva, Bolívar in the Bolívar Department of Colombia
- Country: Colombia
- Department: Bolívar Department

Area
  - Municipality and town: 137.1 km^{2} (52.9 sq mi)
  - Urban: 1.39 km^{2} (0.54 sq mi)

Population (2018 census)
  - Municipality and town: 23,777
  - Density: 173.4/km^{2} (449.2/sq mi)
  - Urban: 20,769
  - Urban density: 14,900/km^{2} (38,700/sq mi)
- Time zone: UTC-5 (Colombia Standard Time)

Villanueva (also called Timiriguaco) is a town and municipality located in the Bolívar Department, northern Colombia.

A restoration of name of the municipality to Timiriguaco was pending in 2008.
