= Trío Morales Pino =

The Trío Morales Pino was a Colombian band. The band recorded a large number of discs with traditional Colombian music. The trio was innovative in its use of Colombian traditional instruments: the Bandola, Tiple, and guitar. Its name was inspired by Pedro Morales Pino, one of the most beloved composers and musicians in Colombia.

The main members of the Morales Pino Trio were:

- Álvaro Romero Sánchez - director, composer and guitarist
- Diego Estrada Montoya - Bandola
- Peregrino Galindo - Tiple

The trio developed a successful career in the Colombian musical scene, recording over 24 LP records with record label Sonolux.
