= Guillermo Buitrago =

Colombian composer (1920–1949)

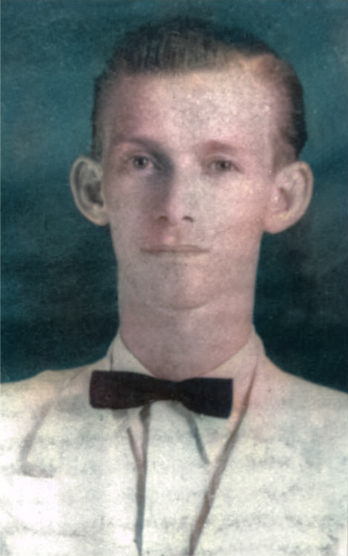
Buitrago c. 1943

Guillermo de Jesús Buitrago Henríquez, known as Guillermo Buitrago (1 April 1920, in Ciénaga – 19 April 1949) was a Colombian singer, composer and songwriter of vallenato music. He became one of the country's most influential early vallenato musicians. His songs, often exploring themes of love, relationships, and festivities, became staples of Christmas celebrations in Colombia. Among his best-known recording are "La Víspera de Año Nuevo" (New Year's Eve), "Grito Vagabundo" (Vagabond Scream or Wandering Cry), "Ron de Vinola" (Vinola Rum) and "Dame tu mujer, José" (Give me your Wife, José).

Buitrago was blonde, fair-skinned, tall, neatly coiffed, wore a tie with a perfect knot, and a triumphant smile that accentuated his prominent chin and his pronounced ears. His father, Guillermo Buitrago Muñoz, was from the region of Antioquia and arrived at Ciénaga from Marinilla, most likely attracted by the "banana boom" that had been dominating Magdalena's economy for several years already by that point. There, Buitrago Muñoz married Teresa Henríquez, a native of Ciénaga, and they had 7 children, 5 of which would die before turning 30. Amongst them was Guillermo, who died at 29 when he was about to sign a big contract that was going to launch his career internationally.

== Biography ==
At 18, Buitrago was already working as an in-house guitarist on a program called "La hora infantile" on the radio station Ecos del Córdoba, on which children from all the local towns would sing, competing for a prize. Buitrago started visiting radio stations to play his music, and finally had a stroke of luck at Radio Magdalena in the city of Santa Marta, where he would gain sufficient experience for his next career step in the coastal city of Barranquilla.

Buitrago since his adolescence had sought out business to record commercial jingles. On multiple occasions, Buitrago explored various opportunities to make songs to promote products or brands. Amongst multiple brand names, he recorded jingles for Ginger Ale and Cerveza Águila. Perhaps the most famous was "El ron motilón", which promoted a rum from the province of Santander, and the long-running Colombian Christmas classic "El ron de vinola", which promoted a type of sugar cane juice that was said to have similarities to wine.

Seven or eight radio shows later, along with a successful jingle El Negro Mendo that he recorded for a furniture and mattress factory, convinced the station directors to give him more air time during prime time, ultimately giving him 3 shows weekly. By 1947 Buitrago was basically living in Barranquilla. During the week he would complete his radio show commitments that were starting to flood in by this point, and on weekends he would travel to Ciénaga to visit his family and friends. Emisoras Unidas, realizing the growing success of Buitrago's music, contracted Julio Bovea, who had just split from Buitrago and had formed his own band to take on an air slot that would compete directly with Buitrago's programming. Pressed to find replacements, Buitrago contacted two musicians he had played with in years prior. With this new group, he would go on to record the majority of his hits, all of which are still known today. Guillermo Buitrago y sus muchachos, his band, had Ángel Fontanilla on lead guitar, Buitrago on rhythm guitar and lead singer, and Carlos "stumpy" Rubio on guacharaca (Rubio was missing part of his left forearm). In some of those early recordings, he also played with accordionist Abel Antonio Villa.

What came next was fame and success. Aside from radio, private parties, local fairs, serenades, by 1947 Toño Fuentes, founder of Discos Fuentes in Medellín and pioneer of the LP industry in Colombia, arrived in Barranquilla looking for Buitrago's band to take them to make a recording at his studio in Cartagena. Elsewhere, Odeón Records of Argentina had also contacted Buitrago, producing some recording that had won a strong following nationally, so much that plans were put in motion to have Buitrago and his band tour the south of the South America.

Two successful years later, Guillermo Buitrago woke up on a day in January 1949, sick and short on sleep. At first, he suspected too many performances had fatigued him, but as the weeks passed by, he started realizing he had an illness that was threatening to become critical. Locals claimed he had a weakened voice and that his "young handsome face looked like a specter with burning dark circles around his eyes". Guillermo Buitrago died on 19 April 1949 at the age of 29 years. The exact cause of his death remains uncertain.

== Discography ==
His music was originally distributed on 78 rpm records. Nobody knows exactly how many songs he recorded, but they were said to be more than 150 songs. His record producers were Discos Fuentes, who have compiled most of his songs in LPs and CDs. During the 1940s, Odeón Argentina and Chile released a few of his songs and some of that Odeón material was also released by Discos Fuentes. Some of his most important records are summarized below.

Víspera de año nuevo

1. "Las mujeres a mí no me quieren"
2. "Compae Heliodoro"
3. "La hija de mi comadre"
4. "Ron de vinola"
5. "Qué criterio"
6. "El hijo de la luna"
7. "Grito vagabundo"
8. "El huerfanito"
9. "La víspera de año nuevo"
10. "La araña picua"
11. "Dame tu mujer José"
12. "La vida es un relajo"

Guillermo Buitrago inédito

1. Se marchitaron las flores
2. La loca Rebeca
3. Muchacha patillalera
4. Gallo basto y pelao
5. El toque de queda
6. El desdichado
7. La cita
8. Careperro
9. Cinco noches de velorio
10. Las contradicciones
11. El gallo atravesao
12. El tigre guapo
13. El maromero
14. Buitrago me tiene un pique

La piña madura

1. La capuchona
2. Adiós mi maye (la despedida)
3. Cienaguera
4. La carta
5. El testamento
6. El tiburón de marbella
7. El amor de claudia
8. Pacha rosado
9. La piña madura
10. La varita de caña
11. Espera que me muera
12. El compa'e Miguel (el ermitaño).

Regalito de navidad

A Little Christmas gift, this long play was edited by Discos Fuentes. Among the 12 songs in the album, four were recorded after Buitrago's death by another singer called, Julio C. San Juan. The songs were San Juan performs in Guillermo Buitrago's place are marked with an asterisk.

1. Regalito de navidad (*)
2. Palomita mensajera (*)
3. Yo no monto en avión (*)
4. El amor es un collar
5. Las sábanas del diluvio
6. Luis Eduardo
7. Rosa Valencia (*)
8. La peste
9. Pacho y Abraham
10. Los enanos
11. El brujo de Arjona (El enviado)
12. Moralito

El testamento y otros cantos ineditos

1. El cazador
2. La mujer que quiere a uno
3. La fiera de pabayo
4. Pacho y Abraham
5. La costumbre de los pueblos
6. El testamento
7. La matica de yuca
8. Espera que muera
9. El dolor de Micaela
10. La vida es un relajo

Vispera de Año Nuevo EP
Discos Fuentes – 600083 Format
Vinyl, 7", 33 ⅓ RPM, EP

1. A1 Compae Heliodoro
2. A2 El Hijo de la Luna
3. B1 Víspera de Año Nuevo
4. B3 Dame tu Mujer Jose

=== Compilation album ===
A CD was produced to restore and compile some of his greatest hits, called 16 Éxitos de Navidad y Año Nuevo. Two of the songs were cut at the very beginning and are missing a small part of the original intro. Also, percussion and a bass were added to almost all the songs, differing from the original tracks:

1. Víspera De Año Nuevo
2. Ron De Vinola
3. Dame Tu Mujer José
4. Grito Vagabundo
5. El Huerfanito
6. Compa'e Heliodoro
7. El Amor De Claudia
8. La Carta
9. La Araña Picua
10. La Piña Madura
11. La Hija De Mi Comadre
12. Qué Criterio
13. Las Mujeres A Mi No Me Quieren
14. Cienaguera
15. El Testamento
16. El Brujo De Arjona

=== Other songs released in 78s ===
Some other songs that have only ever been released in 78s and never reissued as LPs or CDs (and thus they have disappeared almost completely, or only collectors possess them) include:

- Buitrago me tiene un pique (1st version)
- Como se pierde se gana (bolero)
- Compay Chaney (El zorro)
- El bachiller
- El bobo de la yuca (Buitrago just did backing vocals)
- El coco rayado
- El día de San Sebastián (El caimán)
- El doctor Rafael Lavalle
- El compa´e Miguel (1st version)
- El jerre jerre – El negro maldito
- El negro Mendo
- La estricnina
- La vaca lechera
- Linda nena
- Los panderos de Río Frío
- Mi guayabo
- Mil veces (Lombo)
- Mi morenita
- Petra la pelua
- Santo Tomás
- Zorro chucho, marimonda y baco

In addition to those, the following are completely unavailable:

- El alazanito
- Mala noche (El negrito figurín)
- Toño Miranda en el Valle
- Falsas caricias
- Anhelos
- Los choferes
- La rosca
- Teresa Mercedes
- Las muchachas de Buitrago
- Ritmo colombiano (Mi Colombia) (Buitrago just did backing vocals)
- La cañandonga

=== Radio advertising ===
Buitrago also recorded a number of songs for radio advertising that were never commercially released:

- Ron Añejo (*)
- Ron Motilón (*)
- Radio document (advertising Butrago's radio programme) (*)
- Canada Dry
- Nutrimalta
- La Costeña (a tailor shop)
- El Colegio (a food supply and liquor store)
- La piladora de Tomás
- Farmacia San José
- Farmacia Royal
- Almendra Tropical (a café)
- Muebles la Fama (a furniture shop)
- Gentleman (Colombian cigarettes)
- La Mayorquina (a candy store)
- Flor del campo (a bakery)

The songs marked with an asterisk are the only ones for which a recording by Buitrago has been found.
