= Francisco Cristancho Camargo =

Colombian musician, composer, and conductor

- Born: 27 September 1905; Iza, Colombia
- Died: 9 February 1977 (aged 71) Bogotá, Colombia
- Instruments: guitar; trombone
- Spouse: Sofía Hernández
- Children: Francisco Cristancho Hernández

Francisco Cristancho Camargo (Note: In this Spanish name, the first or paternal surname is Cristancho and the second or maternal family name is Camargo.) (1905–1977) was a Colombian musician, composer, and conductor. He studied at the Madrid Royal Conservatory and conducted several orchestras on his return to Colombia.

== Biography ==
=== Early life and education ===
Cristancho was born on 27 September 1905 in Iza, in the Colombian department of Boyacá. He went to school in Iza and then at the Colegio de Boyacá in Tunja. By the age of 5 he could play multiple instruments, and at 10 he composed his first song.

=== Music career ===
As a young man Cristancho moved to Bogotá, where he was selected to join a musical delegation (alongside Jerónimo Velasco, Emilio Murillo, Alejandro Wills, and Alberto Escobar) that travelled to Seville to perform at the 1929 Seville Fair. When the delegation returned to Colombia, Cristancho stayed in Spain and enrolled at the Madrid Royal Conservatory. He travelled in Europe and played with the Orquesta Andrés Moltó; he planned to stay permanently, but left in 1937 due to the Spanish Civil War.

Cristancho returned to Bogotá where he conducted orchestras including the Orquesta Suramérica, the Orquesta Universal, and the Orquesta Ritmo, as well as forming his own band (Francisco Cristancho Camargo y su Orquesta). In 1946–1950 Cristancho lived in Brazil, and after returning again to Colombia he conducted the Boyacá Department Band for eight years. He also played a part in restructuring SAYCO, the Colombian copyright collective, and in 1950 he took a Colombian radio station to court for broadcasting his song "Pa Qué Me Miró" without permission.

=== Personal life and death ===
Cristancho was married to Sofía Hernández, and their sons Mauricio and Francisco Cristancho Hernández were both musicians. He died on 9 February 1977 in Bogotá.

== Musical style and compositions ==
Cristancho could play guitar and trombone, and was also a renowned composer and arranger. He composed in several styles, and his notable compositions include the bambucos "Bochica", "Bacatá", and "Dende Que Se Jue con Otro", and the pasillos "Chía" and "Iza".
