= Soplaviento =

Coordinates: 10°20′N 75°06′W

- Municipality and town
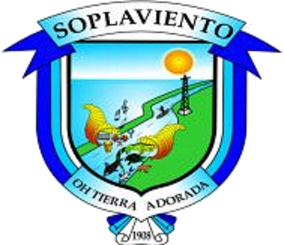
- Coat of arms

- Location of the municipality and town of Soplaviento in the Bolívar Department of Colombia
- Country: Colombia
- Department: Bolívar Department
- Time zone: UTC-5 (Colombia Standard Time)

Soplaviento is a town and municipality located in the Bolívar Department, northern Colombia. The town is located on the south bank of the Dique Canal across from the town of San Estanislao.
