= Discos Fuentes =

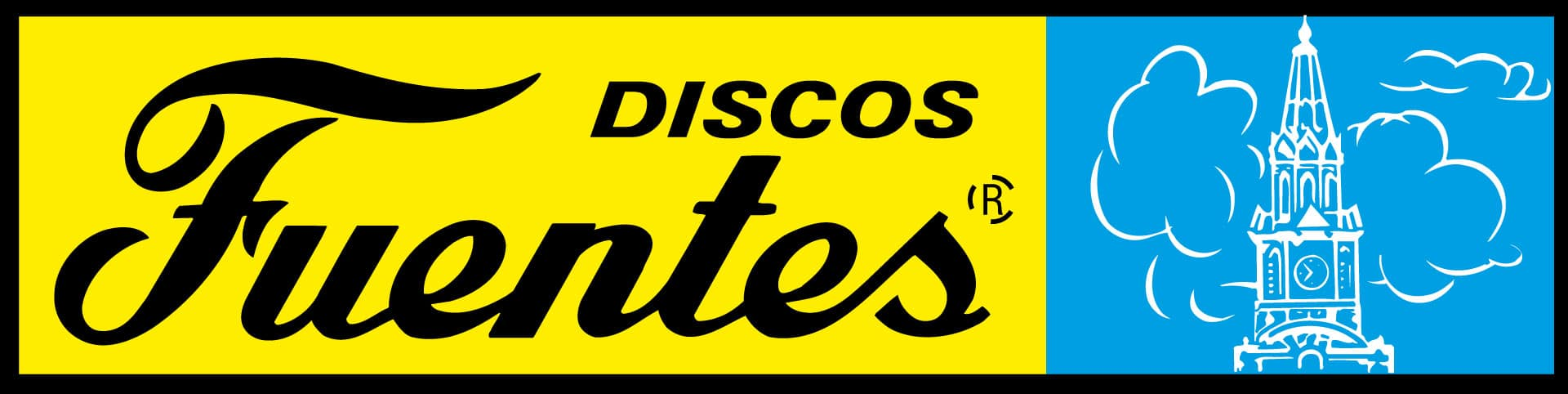
- Founded: 1934
- Founder: Antonio Fuentes Estrada
- Genre: Latin, cumbia, salsa
- Country of origin: Colombia
- Location: Medellín
- Official website: www.discosfuentes.com (in Spanish)

Discos Fuentes is a record label based in Medellín, Colombia. Founded by Antonio Fuentes Estada in 1934 in Cartagena, Colombia, it was the country's earliest major record label and, alongside Sonolux and Discos Vergara, helped establish Colombia's first generation of record companies.

Initially working alongside the radio station La Voz de Laboratorios Fuentes (later Emisora Fuentes), Toño Fuentes, himself a musician who had studied in Philadelphia, United States, sought to establish a record label devoted to exploring regional music and recording technoligies. The label played an instrumental role in introducing Colombian audiences to Afro-influenced genres such as cumbia, fandango, merengue, porro, salsa and rock and roll. It also helped launch the early careers of musicians and composers such as Guillermo Buitrago, Rafael Escalona, and Julio César Bovea. From the 1940s to the 1960s, Discos Fuentes issued recordings of porro, gaita, fandango, cumbia, merengue, paseo, pasillo, tango, bambuco and son vallenato, with some early recordings featuring guitar-based groups rather than accordion-based ensembles.

Between 1934 y 1954, Discos Fuentes recorded works by Guillermo Buitrago, Bovea y sus Vallenatos, Julio César Sanjuan «Buitraguito», Esther Forero, José Barros, Charlie Figueroa y La Sonora Malecón Club, Los Trovadores de Barú, and Lucho Bermúdez, along with his vocalists Matilde Díaz y Bobby Ruiz. Other artists and ensembles recorded by the label included Orquesta Emisora Fuentes, Orquesta Melodía y Pedro Laza, who recorded with Daniel Santos, El Trío Nacional and El Trío Los Romanceros, as well as traditional music ensembles featuring gaitas and other instruments, such as Manuel Silvestre Julio y su Conjunto de Gaitas.

Fuentes' approach to music production has been described as flexible and collaborative. While managing the business, he remained actively involved in musical arrangements, encouraing musicians from different ensembles to work together and experiment with new sounds. For example, ensembles such as "Los Trovadores de Barú" and "Los Piratas de Bocachica" served as the label's core backing groups, accompanying artists such as Buitrago, Barrios on their recordings.

The label's first two recordings were Dos Almas and Deuda, followed by Lucho Bermúdez's Doble Cero, and Clímaco Sarmiento's La vaca vieja.

Discos Fuentes has often been described as Colombia's version of "Motown", peaking in the 1960s and early 1970s. The label achieved a series of firsts for Colombia: the first compilation album (1960) and the first Compact Disc release (1987).

After the death of the label's founder, Antonio Fuentes Estrada, in 1985, the company expanded into video production and acquired several other music labels, including Curro, and Discos Tropical, which was founded by Emilio Fortou, the son of a French migrant who had worked for Avianca and several radio stations.

== US distribution ==
In the United States, the manufacture and/or distribution of Discos Fuentes releases was eventually handled by Miami Records, a Miami, Florida-based label specializing in Latin American music. Formed in 1950 by Colombian immigrant, Carlos Diaz-Granados, Sr., Miami Records also managed the manufacture and/or distribution of Latin music for other South American labels as well as for such American labels as Columbia Records.

== Select artists ==
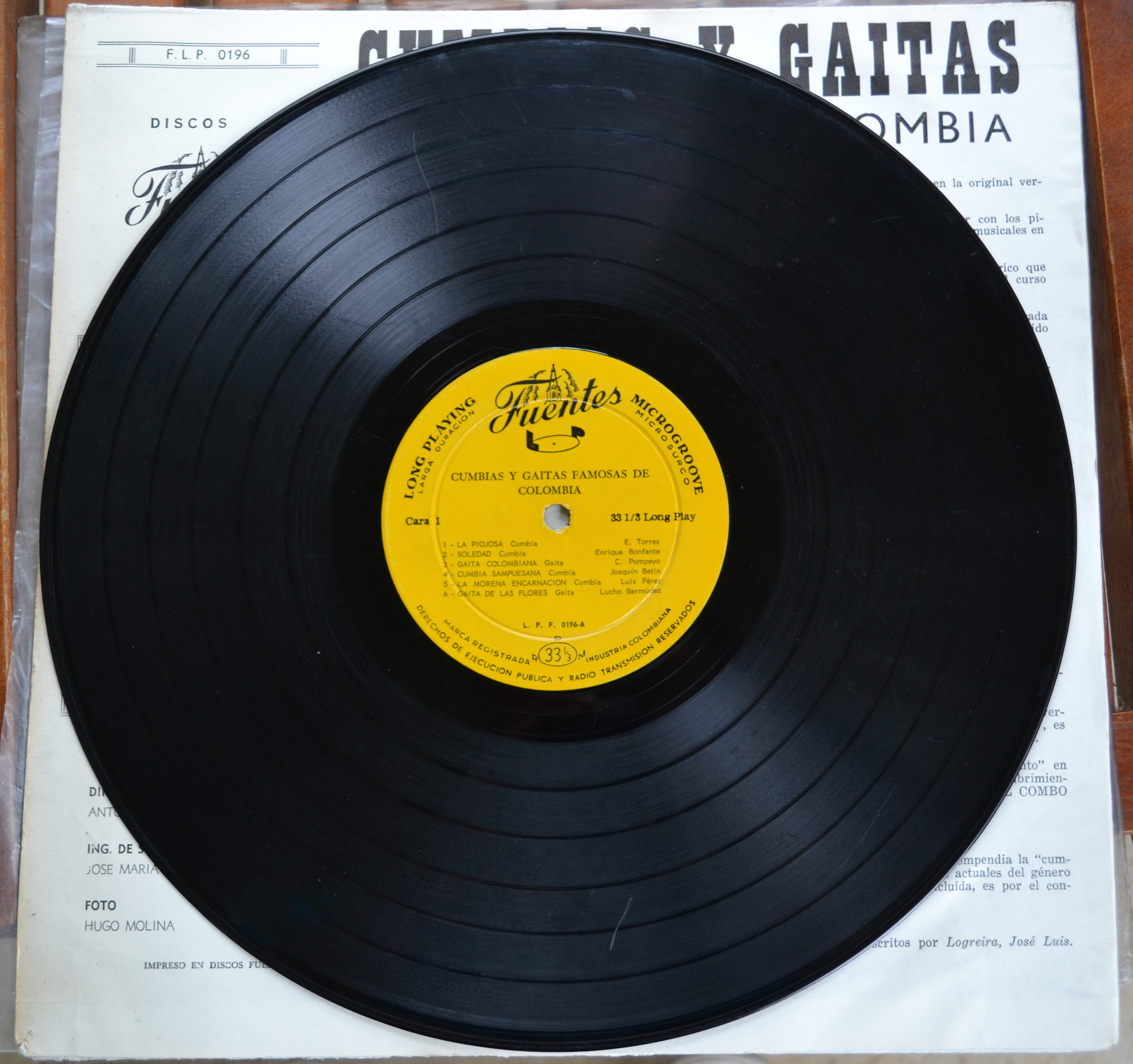
Discos Fuentes LP record

- Afrosound
- Rodolfo Aicardi
- Sonora Cordobesa
- Edmundo Arias
- Guillermo Buitrago
- Joe Arroyo
- Lucho Bermudez
- Ariza y Su Combo
- Lito Barrientos
- Los Bestiales
- Clímaco Sarmiento
- Combo Los Galleros
- El Combo Loco
- Los Corraleros de Majagual
- Rafael Escalona
- Tata Guines
- Fruko y sus Tesos/Fruko El Bueno
- Rufo Garrido
- Alfredo Gutiérrez
- Eliseo Herrera
- Fela Kuti
- Andrés Landero
- The Latin Brothers
- Pedro Laza y sus Pelayeros
- Los Lideres
- Calixto Ochoa
- Los Pico Pico
- Joe Rodríguez y su Grupo Latino
- Julio Bovea
- La Sonora Carruseles
- La Sonora Dinamita
- Los Teen Agers
- Michi Sarmiento y sus Bravos
- Pastor López
- Puerto Rican Power
- Rodolfo y su Tipica RA7
- Wganda Kenya
- Lisandro Meza
- Catalino Tejedor
- Aníbal Velásquez
