= Plato, Magdalena =

Plato
- Municipality and town
- Flag Coat of arms

- Location of the municipality and town of Plato in the Department of Magdalena.

- Location within Colombia
- Coordinates: 9°47′31″N 74°47′14″W
- Country: Colombia
- Region: Caribbean
- Department: Magdalena
- Founded: 1626

Government
  - Mayor: Jaime Peña Peñaranda

Area
  - Municipality and town: 1,457 km^{2} (563 sq mi)
  - Urban: 7.81 km^{2} (3.02 sq mi)
- Elevation: 20 m (66 ft)

Population (2018 census)
  - Municipality and town: 61,766
  - Density: 42.39/km^{2} (109.8/sq mi)
  - Urban: 47,141
  - Urban density: 6,040/km^{2} (15,600/sq mi)
- Demonym: Plateño
- Time zone: UTC-5
- Website: Official website (in Spanish)

Plato is a town and municipality in Magdalena Department in Colombia.

- Area: 1,457 km².
- Elevation: 20 meters
- Population: 66,362
  - Rural: 18,625
  - Urban: 47,737
- Agricultural products: livestock, corn, beans, tomatoes, yuca, tobacco

== Points of interest ==
- Alligator Man Park
- Statue of Bolivar
- Statue of the Virgin of Carmen

== Transports ==
The city is served by the Plato Airport (IATA: PLT, ICAO: SKPL)
