= Aníbal Velásquez =

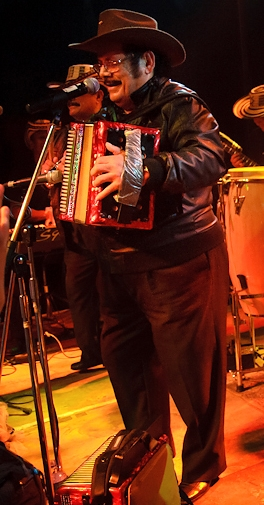
- Velásquez at Fusion Festival in 2011

Background information
- Birth name: Aníbal Velásquez Hurtado
- Also known as: "El Mago" (The Magician)
- Born: June 3, 1936 (age 89); Barranquilla, Colombia
- Genres: Cumbia, Guaracha, Vallenato
- Occupation(s): Composer, singer, accordionist
- Years active: 1952–present

Aníbal Velásquez Hurtado (born June 3, 1936) is a Colombian singer, composer and musician, recognized for playing the accordion. He is also known by his nicknames "El Mago" ("The Magician") and "El Rey de la Guaracha" ("The King of the Guaracha").

== Biography ==
Aníbal Velásquez was born in 1936 in Barranquilla, Colombia to parents José Antonio Velásquez and Belén Hurtado, and is the brother of the musician José "Cheíto" Velásquez. He is the father of Nelson Velásquez, former member of the vallenato group Los Inquietos del Vallenato.

He had his first hit ("La Gallina") in 1952 as part of the band Los Vallenatos del Magdalena with Roberto and Carlos Román and remained with the band until it disbanded due to Roberto's death. Later, he created his own group with his brothers Juan and José, and with them created a distinctive style of guaracha music with accordion at the beginning of the 1960s; it drew on both Caribbean and South American genres and influences.

Due to the local rise in cartel-associated violent crime, Velásquez moved to Caracas, Venezuela in the 1970s and resided there for 18 years before returning to Barranquilla.

In 2018 Telecaribe, a regional television network for the Caribbean region of Colombia, launched a bio-series as a living tribute to his career, called Aníbal 'Sensación' Velásquez. Over his six-decade-long career, it is estimated Velásquez has recorded over 300 albums and potentially over 500 singles.

In 2019, Velásquez was reported to be seriously sick and was hospitalized in Barranquilla due to a severe lung infection.
