= Pedro Biava =

Italian and Colombian musician, composer, and teacher

- Born: Pedro Biava Ramponi; 11 June 1902; Rome, Italy
- Died: 16 June 1972 (aged 70) Barranquilla, Colombia
- Spouse: Mercedes Sosa

Pedro Biava Ramponi (1902–1972) was an Italian and Colombian musician, composer, and teacher. He moved to Barranquilla in 1926 and had a significant influence on the Colombian tropical music scene, founding several orchestras and teaching musicians including Lucho Bermúdez and Antonio María Peñaloza.

== Biography ==
=== Early life ===
Pedro Biava Ramponi was born on 11 June 1902 in Rome to Constantino Biava and Lucía Ramponi. At the age of 9 he enrolled at the Conservatorio Santa Cecilia, where he studied clarinet, composition, and conducting. As a young man he served as a soldier in the 53rd Infantry Regiment "Umbria" of the Italian Army.

=== Music career ===
In 1926 Biava travelled by ship to Colombia, arriving to Puerto Colombia on 11 August 1926. He went to Barranquilla where he was employed, alongside several other Italian musicians, to play live accompaniment to silent films; his first such performance was on 15 August 1926 for The Lion of the Moguls. From 1928 to 1929 he played clarinet in the Banda Nacional de Bogotá led by José Rozo Contreras.

Biava taught for several years at the conservatory of the University of Atlántico. His students there included Hans Federico Neuman del Castillo, Lucho Bermúdez, Pacho Galán, Antonio María Peñaloza, Adaúlfo Moncada, Alberto Carbonell, the singers Miriam Pantoja, Tina Altamar and Fabiola Franco, and the pianists Delia Donado, Marta Emiliani, and Julita Consuegra.

In 1941 Biava founded the Philharmonic Orchestra of Barranquilla. He founded the Barranquilla Opera and the string quartet of the Barranquilla conservatory in 1943. From 1953 to 1959 Biava was director of the Banda Departamental of Atlántico.

=== Personal life and death ===
On 29 December 1929, Biava married Mercedes Sosa, daughter of conductor Luis Felipe Sosa. Together they had 6 children: Lucía, Luis, Pedro Rafael, Constantino, Miguel, and Carlos. Biava obtained Colombian nationality in 1942.

Biava suffered a thrombosis in 1970 and was partially paralysed for six months. He died on 16 June 1972 in Barranquilla.
