= Edmundo Arias =

Colombian musician, songwriter, and bandleader

- Born: Edmundo Dante Arias Valencia; 5 November 1925; Tuluá, Colombia
- Died: 28 January 1993 (aged 67) Medellín, Colombia
- Genres: tropical music, bolero, pasillo
- Years active: 1948–1993

Edmundo Dante Arias Valencia (Note: In this Spanish name, the first or paternal surname is Arias and the second or maternal family name is Valencia.) was a Colombian musician, songwriter, and bandleader. Arias composed more than 300 songs, and recorded for various Colombian record labels including Discos Fuentes, Zeida, Ondina, and Sonolux. He is considered one of the "big three" composers of Colombian tropical music of the 1950s and 60s, alongside Lucho Bermúdez and Pacho Galán.

== Biography ==
Edmundo Arias was born on 5 November 1925 in Tuluá, Colombia. His mother was Amelia Valencia Arizabaleta, and his father was Joaquín Arias Cardoza, a composer from Antioquia; altogether the couple had 9 children. As a child Arias learned to play various instruments at home, and together with his father and younger brother Ricaurte formed the Trío Arias, which performed in Valle del Cauca and Risaralda, and appeared on the radio in Pereira. Following the death of his father in 1948, Arias took over leadership of some of his bands.

In 1951 Arias moved to Medellín. In Medellín he recorded for various record labels, including Discos Fuentes, Zeida, Ondina, and Sonolux. Unlike other bandleaders in Colombia at the time, Arias did not have a permanent orchestra; instead he would bring musicians together only when he had new material to record. The groups that he formed in this way include Edmundo Arias y Su Orquesta, the Sonora Cabecenido, the Sonora Antillana, Conjunto de Edmundo Arias, and the Orquesta Estudiantina Sonolux.

Arias was well known for his shyness. He was nicknamed cabeza-de-nido, (Note: Or cabeza'e nido. The name means "bird's-nest-hair".) which was used for the name of the band Sonora Cabecenido.

Arias died of uremia on 28 January 1993 in Medellín.

== Musical style and notable compositions ==
Arias wrote his first song "Las Diez Velas" at the age of 25, and in total composed more than 300. Many of his compositions were also recorded by other artists, including Los Corraleros de Majagual, Los Melódicos, and Celia Cruz.

Arias composed and recorded in a wide range of styles. His notable compositions include:

- Cumbias, porros and merecumbés: "Ligia", "Diciembre Azul", "Cumbia Candelosa", "Güepa... Je", "Ave 'Pa 'Ve", "Cumbia del Caribe", "Juanita Bonita", "La Luna y el Pescador", "El Mecánico", "El Merecumbé de las Flores", "Algo Se Me Va", "Tu Juramento".
- Boleros: "Me Da Lo Mismo", "Si Hoy Fuera Ayer" (famously recorded by Alci Acosta), "Evocación", "El Chontaduro".
- Pasillos: "Rosalba".

== Discography ==
=== Albums ===
- Alma Colombiana (Zeida, 1959)
- Alfonso López y Amalia, with Conjunto Edmundo Arias (Zeida)

=== Compilations ===
- El Mecánico: Lo Mejor de Edmundo Arias (1978, Sónico)
- Guepa Je! (2024, Radio Martiko)
