= Peter Wade =

British anthropologist (born 1957)

- Born: 16 August 1957 (age 69)

Academic background
- Education: University of Cambridge

Academic work
- Discipline: Anthropology
- Sub-discipline: Race and ethnicity
- Institutions: University of Manchester

Peter Wade is a British anthropologist who specializes in issues of race and ethnicity in Latin America. Peter Wade is a Professor of Social Anthropology at the University of Manchester. He has written numerous books and articles about the social and historical meanings of race, ethnicity and sexuality in the context of Latin America. His "Race and Ethnicity in Latin America" has been described as an "essential text for students studying the region", and it has been published in a second edition.

== Bibliography ==
- 2019. Cultures of Anti-Racism in Latin America and the Caribbean. Edited by Peter Wade, James Scorer and Ignacio Aguiló. London: University of London Press.
- 2017. Degrees of Mixture, Degrees of Freedom: Genomics, Multiculturalism, and Race in Latin America. Durham: Duke University Press.
- 2014. Mestizo Genomics: Race Mixture, Nation, and Science in Latin America. Edited by Peter Wade, Carlos López Beltrán, Eduardo Restrepo, Ricardo Ventura Santos. Durham: Duke University Press.
- 2010. Race and Ethnicity in Latin America. Second, revised and updated edition. London: Pluto Press.
- 2009. Race and Sex in Latin America. London: Pluto Press.
- 2002. Race, Nature and Culture: An Anthropological Approach. London: Pluto Press.
- 2000. Music, Race and Nation: Música Tropical in Colombia. Chicago: University of Chicago Press.
- 1993. Blackness and Race Mixture: The Dynamics of Racial Identity in Colombia. Baltimore: Johns Hopkins University Press.
