= Joe Arroyo discography =

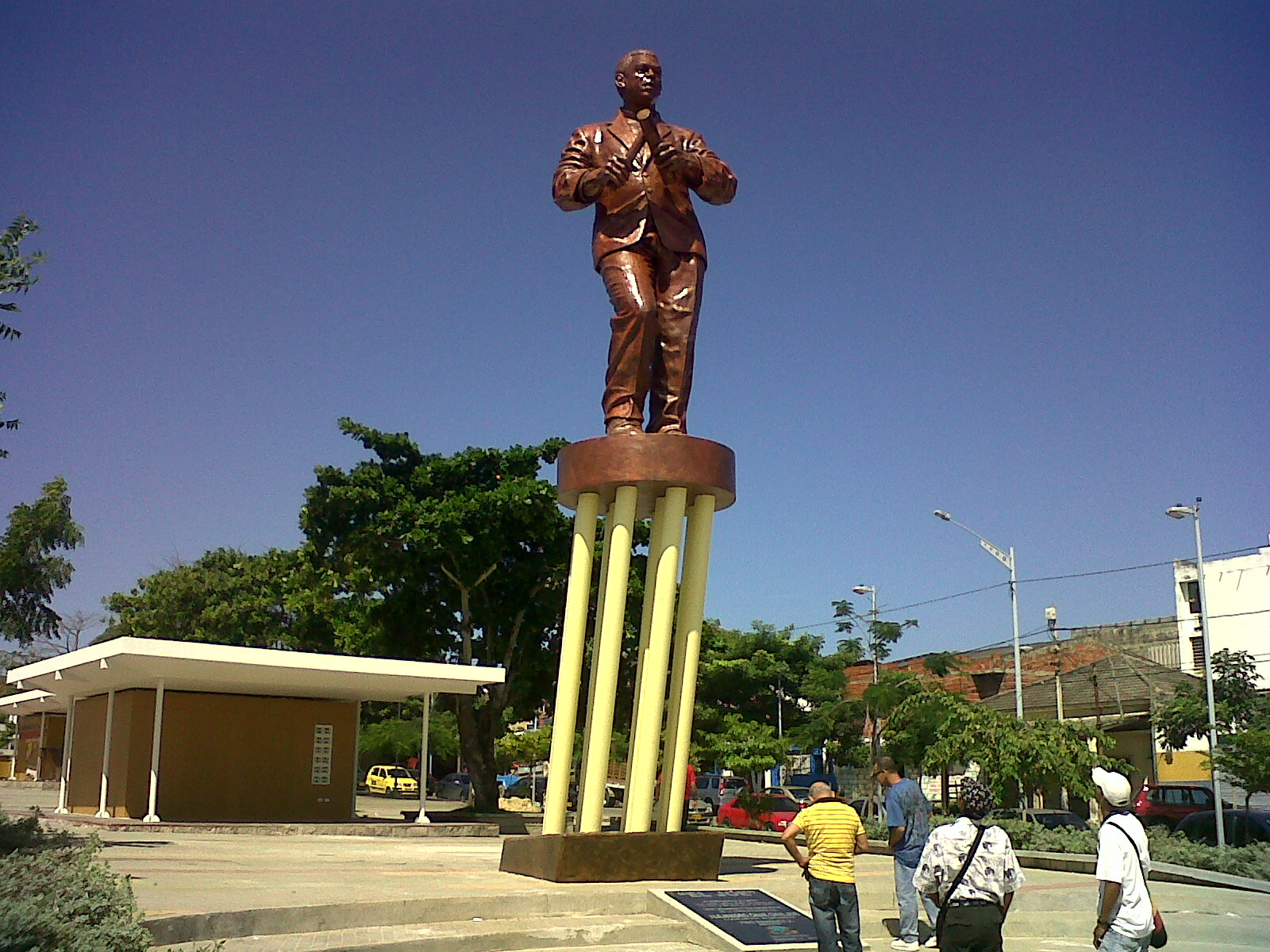
- Studio albums: 23
- Extended plays: 1
- Live albums: 2
- Compilation albums: 32

The discography of Colombian musician singer-songwriter Joe Arroyo consists mostly of twenty-three studio albums, thirty-two compilation albums, two live albums and one extended play. Joe Arroyo when he made his debut as artist in the 1970s, he participated on several albums with the Colombian salsa groups Fruko y sus Tesos and The Latin Brothers, all under the label Discos Fuentes. In 1981 he created his orchestra named "La Verdad", and that same year released two studio album, the first is Arroyando and the second is Con Gusto y Gana. The next year he released El Campeón, this is the album that he dedicates to Kid Pambele and Rocky Valdés. Following the costume of release one album per year. He released Actuando (1983), Hasta Amanecé (1984) and Me le Fugué a la Candela (1985) this last show the drug abuse that he experienced, the album had a great hit that is "Tumbatecho". In 1986 Arroyo recovered the fame and the money that had lost with her past musical productions. So, this year was decisive for him. Arroyo's seventh album Musa Original with the track "Rebelión" the most known song of Joe around the salsa music, also considered a Black anthem. Following the success for this album, released Echao Pa'lante (1987), Fuego en mi Mente (1988), En Acción (1989).

The next year he appeared on Billboard magazine's Tropical Albums chart, with his eleventh album El Super Congo/La Guerra de los Callados, which peaked at #12. This success allowed him to sign with Sony Music, so supporting the upcoming albums of Joe Arroyo: Toque de Clase (1991), Fuego (1993), Sus Razones Tendrá (1995), Mi Libertad (1996), Reinando en Vida (1997), Deja Que Te Cante (1998), Cruzando el Milenio (1999), En Sol Mayor (2000) and his last album on the Sony Music label Marcando Terreno (2001). After of a rest and return to Discos Fuentes, the label that saw it born. In 2004 released his first live album titled Live! and an EP Arroyo Peligroso, the last in a new style, more folk and traditional. Joe Arroyo released Se Armo la Moña en Carnaval (2005) and his last album El Súper Joe (2007) that was nominated as Best contemporary tropical album the next year.

== Albums ==
=== Studio albums ===
==== 1980s ====
List of albums, with selected details
Title	Album details
Arroyando	Released: January 20, 1981; Label: Discos Fuentes; Format: LP
Con Gusto y Gana	Released: December 1, 1981; Label: Discos Fuentes; Format: LP
El Campeón	Released: September 1, 1982; Label: Discos Fuentes; Format: LP
Actuando	Released: September 27, 1983; Label: Discos Fuentes; Format: LP
Hasta Amanecé	Released: November 1, 1984; Label: Discos Fuentes; Format: LP
Me le Fugué a la Candela	Released: August 1, 1985; Label: Discos Fuentes; Format: LP
Musa Original	Released: August 14, 1986; Label: Discos Fuentes; Format: LP, cassette
Echa Pa'lante	Released: November 26, 1987; Label: Discos Fuentes; Format: LP, cassette
Fuego en mi Mente'	Released: November 4, 1988; Label: Discos Fuentes; Format: LP, cassette
En Acción	Released: December 18, 1989; Label: Discos Fuentes; Format: LP, cassette

==== 1990s ====
List of albums, with selected details
Title	Album details
El Super Congo/La Guerra de los Callados	Released: December 28, 1990; Label: Discos Fuentes; Format: Cassette, LP
Toque de Clase	Released: June 15, 1991; Label: Sony Music Colombia; Format: CD, LP, cassette
Fuego	Released: August 6, 1993; Label: Sony Music Colombia; Format: CD, LP, cassette
Sus Razones Tendrá	Released: October 21, 1994; Label: Sony Music; Format: CD, LP, cassette
Mi Libertad	Released: December 12, 1995; Label: Sony Music Colombia; Format: CD, LP, cassette
Reinando en Vida	Released: November 27, 1996; Label: Sony Music; Format: CD, LP, cassette
Deja Que Te Cante	Released: November 26, 1997; Label: Sony Music; Format: CD, cassette
Cruzando el Milenio	Released: December 4, 1998; Label: Sony Music; Format: CD, cassette
En Sol Mayor	Released: December 3, 1999; Label: Sony Music Colombia; Format: Cassette, CD

==== 2000s ====
List of albums, with selected details
Title	Album details
Marcando Terreno	Released: December 14, 2001; Label: Sony Music Colombia; Format: CD
Se Armo la Moña en Carnaval	Released: May 10, 2005; Label: Discos Fuentes; Format: CD
El Súper Joe	Released: September 14, 2007; Label: Discos Fuentes; Format: CD

=== Live albums ===
List of albums, with selected details
Title	Album details
La Historia, Vol. 1	Released: April 29, 2003; Label: Sony Music Colombia; Format: DVD
Live!	Released: August 31, 2004; Label: Sony Music Colombia; Format: DVD

=== Extended plays ===
List of albums, with selected details
Title	Album details
Arroyo Peligroso	Released: March 16, 2004; Label: Discos Fuentes; Format: Digital download, CD
