= The Rough Guide to Salsa (1997 album) =

Compilation album by Various artists
- Released: 18 November 1997
- Genre: World, salsa
- Length: 67:43
- Label: World Music Network

Full series chronology
The Rough Guide to Reggae (1997)	The Rough Guide to Salsa (1997)	The Rough Guide to English Roots Music (1998)

The Rough Guide to Salsa is a world music compilation album originally released in 1997. Part of the World Music Network Rough Guides series, the album gives broad coverage to the salsa genre of Latin America, focusing on classic styles. Seven of the fourteen tracks are by Cuban musicians, five are Colombian, and one each is Venezuelan and American. The compilation was produced by Phil Stanton, co-founder of the World Music Network. Liner notes were written by Tom Andrews. This was the first of three similarly named albums: the second was released in 2007; the third, in 2012.

== Critical reception ==
Professional ratings
Review scores
Source	Rating
AllMusic	4.5/5 stars

The album received positive reviews. Raymond McKinney of AllMusic called it a "superb introduction". Michaelangelo Matos of the Chicago Reader felt it went down "as smooth as ice cream", praising its lack of drum machines.

== Track listing ==
No.	Title	Artist (Country)	Length
1.	"Carruseles"	Sonora Carruseles (Colombia)	3:46
2.	"Pegaso"	The Latin Brothers (Colombia)	4:31
3.	"Pa'l Bailador"	Joe Arroyo Y La Verdad (Colombia)	4:30
4.	"Azulito"	Mario Bauzá (Cuba)	4:16
5.	"El Lenguaje del Son"	Ritmo Y Candela II & Carlos "Patato" Valdes (Cuba)	6:24
6.	"Guateque Campesino"	Conjunto Campesino Cuyaguateje (Cuba)	4:30
7.	"Se Quema la Chumbambá"	La Familia Valera Miranda (Cuba)	4:57
8.	"Mulence"	Jesús Alemañy & ¡Cubanismo! (Cuba)	5:24
9.	"Mulata Coqueta"	Oscar D'León (Venezuela)	5:40
10.	"Del Monton"	La Sonora Dinamita (Colombia)	3:22
11.	"Manyoma"	Fruko y sus Tesos (Colombia)	4:08
12.	"La Negra Tomasa"	Grupo El Organo Pinareño (Cuba)	5:25
13.	"Tumbao a Peruchin"	Alfredo Rodriguez (Cuba)	4:39
14.	"Fiesta a la King"	Charlie Palmieri (United States)	6:11
