= Pa'lante =

Pa'lante is a Spanish contraction of para adelante (straight ahead). Pa'lante, or variants, may refer to:

== Music ==
=== Albums ===
- Pa'lante, by Willy Chirino
- Pa'lante! Straight!, by Tito Puente
- Echao Pa'lante, by Joe Arroyo and La Verdad
- Echando Pa'lante (Straight Ahead), by Eddie Palmieri
- Straight Ahead (Pa'lante), by Poncho Sanchez

=== Songs ===
- "Pa'lante", a song by Joelma from the album Joelma
- "Pa'lante", a song by Hurray for the Riff Raff from the album The Navigator
- "Palante", a song by Soleá representing Spain in the Junior Eurovision Song Contest 2020
- "Pa'lante", a song by Ilan Chester from the album Así

== Other ==
- Pa'lante, a newspaper of the Young Lords New York chapter

== See also ==
- Palante, France
- Pallante, a surname
