= The Punisher: One Last Kill (soundtrack) =

2026 soundtrack album

The Punisher: One Last Kill (Original Soundtrack)

Film score by Kris Bowers
- Released: May 15, 2026
- Genre: Film score
- Length: 24:22
- Labels: Hollywood; Marvel Music

Kris Bowers chronology
Goat (2026)	The Punisher: One Last Kill (Original Soundtrack) (2026)	Spider-Noir (2026)

The Punisher: One Last Kill (Original Soundtrack) is the film score to the Marvel Studios television special The Punisher: One Last Kill, composed by Kris Bowers. The soundtrack album was released by Hollywood Records and Marvel Music on May 15, 2026.

== Development ==
Director Reinaldo Marcus Green's frequent collaborator Kris Bowers was revealed to be composing the score for One Last Kill in April 2026. Bowers previously scored the MCU miniseries Secret Invasion (2023). The score album was digitally released on May 15.

Music featured in One Last Kill includes "Mother" by Danzig, "El Preso" by Fruko y sus Tesos, "La Vie en rose" by Louis Armstrong, and "I Will Be Heard" by Hatebreed.

== Track listing ==
All music is composed by Kris Bowers.

No.	Title	Length
1.	"Welcome Back, Frank"	1:05
2.	"The Punisher: One Last Kill"	2:17
3.	"The Dark Path"	1:43
4.	"I Think I Need Some Help"	1:38
5.	"I'm Tired, Baby"	2:49
6.	"Will God Forgive Us?"	1:31
7.	"Family Business"	4:14
8.	"No Mercy"	1:34
9.	"War Zone"	0:47
10.	"Check the Magazines"	1:27
11.	"Frank Castiglione"	2:51
12.	"This Is for You"	2:36
13.	"Circle of Blood"	0:55
14.	"Punisher Patrol"	1:35
Total length:		24:22
