= Arroyo Peligroso =

EP by Joe Arroyo
- Released: March 16, 2004
- Genres: Cumbia, Salsa, Porro, Tropical
- Language: Spanish
- Label: Discos Fuentes
- Producers: Álvaro Arroyo, Cheo Feliciano, Darío De Castro, Gustavo Rada

Joe Arroyo albums chronology
Marcando Terreno (2001)	Arroyo Peligroso (2004)	Live! (2004)

Arroyo Peligroso (Dangerous Creek) is the first EP by Colombian musician and singer-songwriter Joe Arroyo, released on March 16, 2004 under the label of Discos Fuentes. After the end of his contract with Sony Music, Arroyo decided to return to Discos Fuentes. This album offers a more commercial, folkloric rhythm and a mild introduction to his upcoming album Se Armo la Moña en Carnaval (2005). It had two hits in Colombia: "La Fundillo Loco" and "El Torito". It was released at the beginning of the year, coinciding with the Carnival of Barranquilla. Popular legend in Barranquilla has it that "La Fundillo Loco" was dedicated to his ex Mary.

== Track listing ==
No.	Title	Writer(s)	Length
1.	"La Fundillo Loco ("The Crazy Girl")"	Joe Arroyo	3:59
2.	"Chuvidu"	Joe Arroyo	3:43
3.	"Corazón Rumbero ("Rumbero Heart")"	Joe Arroyo	4:02
4.	"El Ratón ("The Rat")"	Cheo Feliciano	3:38
5.	"El Torito ("The Little Bull")"	Gustavo Rada	3:54
6.	"La Fundillo Loco" (Tribal Mix)	Joe Arroyo	4:30

== Personnel ==
Many people were involved in the production:

=== Musicians ===
- Joe Arroyo – composer, vocals
- Jorge Grajales – background vocals
- Alvaro Pava – background vocals
- Juan David – background vocals
- Morists Jiménez – background, trombone
- Luis Bolívar – lead guitar (electric)
- Edgardo Fabregas – bass, bajo sexto
- Giovanny Montoya – bass
- Ramón Benítez – bombard
- Diego Galé – bongo drum, conga, maracas, güiro
- Carlos Piña – saxophone, guache
- Ostual Serna – tres
- Hugo Fernández – trumpet
- Chelito De Castro – instrumentation, piano

=== Production ===
- Líliana Guarín – graphic design
- Julio Estrada – keyboard programming
- Jorge Parra Jr. – keyboard programming
- Gabriel Gutierrez – mastering
- Darío De Castro – arranger, production
- Cheo Feliciano – composer
- Gustavo Rada – composer
