= Afrosound =

Colombian band

- Also known as: The Afrosound
- Origin: Medellín, Colombia
- Label: Discos Fuentes
- Website: afrosoundoficial.com

Afrosound are a Colombian band, founded by Medellín-based record label Discos Fuentes in 1972. They released several successful albums in the 1970s and 1980s, and since reforming in the 2020s have released two more. Afrosound play various Colombian styles of music, significantly influenced by cumbia amazónica from Peru. The original members of Afrosound were studio musicians at Discos Fuentes, and concurrently played in other bands including Los Tesos and the Latin Brothers.

== Initial formation ==
Afrosound were initially formed by Discos Fuentes to allow the label to compete commercially with Chicano rock and Latin soul releases coming from the United States. The first Afrosound release was a cover of "Jungle Fever" by the Chakachas, which came out as a split single with a Tito Puente track. "Jungle Fever" was included on the 1972 compilation album Joint, alongside another Afrosound song called "Dog, Cat". That year Afrosound appeared on Fuentes' annual 14 Cañonazos Bailables compilation with the track "El Eco y el Carretero", a "fusion of son cubano and rock". Several of Afrosound's early tracks were reissued on the 2010 compilation album The Afrosound of Colombia Vol. 1 on Vampisoul. In a review of the album, PopMatters wrote that "Afrosound's music was indeed experimental, though its quirkiness can occasionally grate".

== 1973–1975: Colombian–Peruvian fusion ==
In 1973 Antonio Fuentes, owner of Discos Fuentes, requested that the label find a commercial answer to electric-guitar-driven cumbia amazónica coming out of Peru. (Note: Another version of the story attributes the idea to label director José María Fuentes.) Mariano Sepúlveda, the guitarist for Afrosound, took over leadership of the band; he was already "enthusiastic" about Peruvian cumbia artists, particularly los Destellos and their guitarist Enrique Delgado. In 1973, Afrosound released their debut album La Danza de los Mirlos, whose title track is a cover version of a song which had been a hit for Peruvian cumbia band Los Mirlos earlier in the year. The Afrosound version has a higher tempo, and was successful in Colombia and Peru. The rest of the album is more Colombian in style, but still features psychedelic elements of Peruvian cumbia amazónica like distorted electric guitar and Hammond organ. Fruko wrote the track "El Chorrillo" as a tribute to Sepúlveda. Other tracks on the album include "Sabor Navideño", which is reminiscent of Gildardo Montoya's "Navidad Negra", "Caliventura", a blend of cumbia and salsa that was specifically targeted at the music markets in Cali and Buenaventura, a version of Alejo Durán's vallenato "Cachucha Bacana", and three covers of Nelson y sus Estrellas songs. Musicologist Juan Diego Parra wrote that Afrosound were at the time making music "as innovative for Colombia as it was for Peru".

Afrosound released their second album Onda Brava in 1974. The album contains no Peruvian songs and has a sound closer to the Caribbean style of the Sexteto Miramar than their debut, but Sepúlveda's guitar playing again provides what Parra calls "psychedelic atmospheres". Other tracks include the tropical rock song "La Realidad" written by Fruko, a cover of Willie Colón's "El Día de Mi Suerte", and the Latin soul song "Una Abeja en el Semáforo".

Later in 1974, Afrosound released their third album, Carruseles, which is predominantly salsa. It includes cover versions of the tracks "Ponchito de Colores", by Ecuadorian musician Polibio Mayorga, and "Carruseles", originally recorded by the Sexteto Miramar. A Songlines review of a 2023 reissue of Carruseles described it as "quite bonkers". Afrosound's fourth album Calor was released in 1975. It features a cover of "Caminito Serrano" by los Destellos, and a version of Pedro Salcedo's "Pacífico" in a mix of bambuco and currulao styles.

== 1976–1984: Later albums, broader genres ==
In 1976 Afrosound released their fifth album, Afrosound Vol. 4. The LP sleeve features the head of a tiger, unlike the previous four album covers which were all photographs of women in swimsuits posing suggestively. The songs on Afrosound Vol. 4 are in a broader range of musical styles than Afrosound's earlier albums, including surf rock on "Honolulu" and samba on "Brasilia". The track "Salomé" was the debut record of singer Juan Carlos Coronel, and according to music journalist Jaime Andrés Monsalve is an example of Afrosound prioritising radio success over artistic expression.

Afrosound took three years to release their next album La Pichoncita in 1979, because the members of the band were busy playing in Fruko y sus Tesos and the Latin Brothers. La Pichoncita contains two compositions each by Sepúlveda and Fruko, as well as a cover of "La Marcha del Pato", originally recorded by Los Mirlos. Tiro al Blanco was released in 1981, and Parra describes the title track as "an aesthetic distillation of the Afrosound concept." The opening guitar riff was, according to Parra, probably taken from Pino Massara's 1979 hit "Margherita (Love In The Sun)". "Tiro al Blanco" was later sampled by Manu Chao on his song "Malegría". Some tracks on Tiro al Blanco have a Peruvian sound ("La Mordidita" by Fruko, and "Muñequita Bailarina" by Guillermo Chaponán of los Destellos), but others depart significantly in style.

In 1984, Afrosound released their eighth album La Negra Carolina, which features the major hit "Esa Pareja" (in paseaito style), and what Monsalve calls "a mind-blowing cumbiambera version" of the Weather Report song "Birdland". The members of Afrosound left Discos Fuentes in 1984, and in 1989 the album Mar de Emociones was released featuring none of the original musicians.

== Modern iteration ==
The current iteration of Afrosound perform regularly at concerts and festivals in Colombia, sometimes accompanied by Fruko and Sepúlveda.

== Albums ==
- La Danza de Los Mirlos (1973, Discos Fuentes)
- Onda Brava (1974, Discos Fuentes)
- Carruseles (1974, Discos Fuentes)
- Calor (1975, Discos Fuentes)
- Afrosound Vol. 4 (1976, Discos Fuentes)
- La Pichoncita (1979, Discos Fuentes)
- Tiro al Blanco (1981, Discos Fuentes)
- La Negra Carolina (1984, Discos Fuentes)
- Mar de Emociones (1989, Discos Fuentes)
- Cumbia y Nada Más (2024, Discos Fuentes)
- Dios Bendiga Este Negocio (2026, Discos Fuentes)
