= Pipe Yanguas =

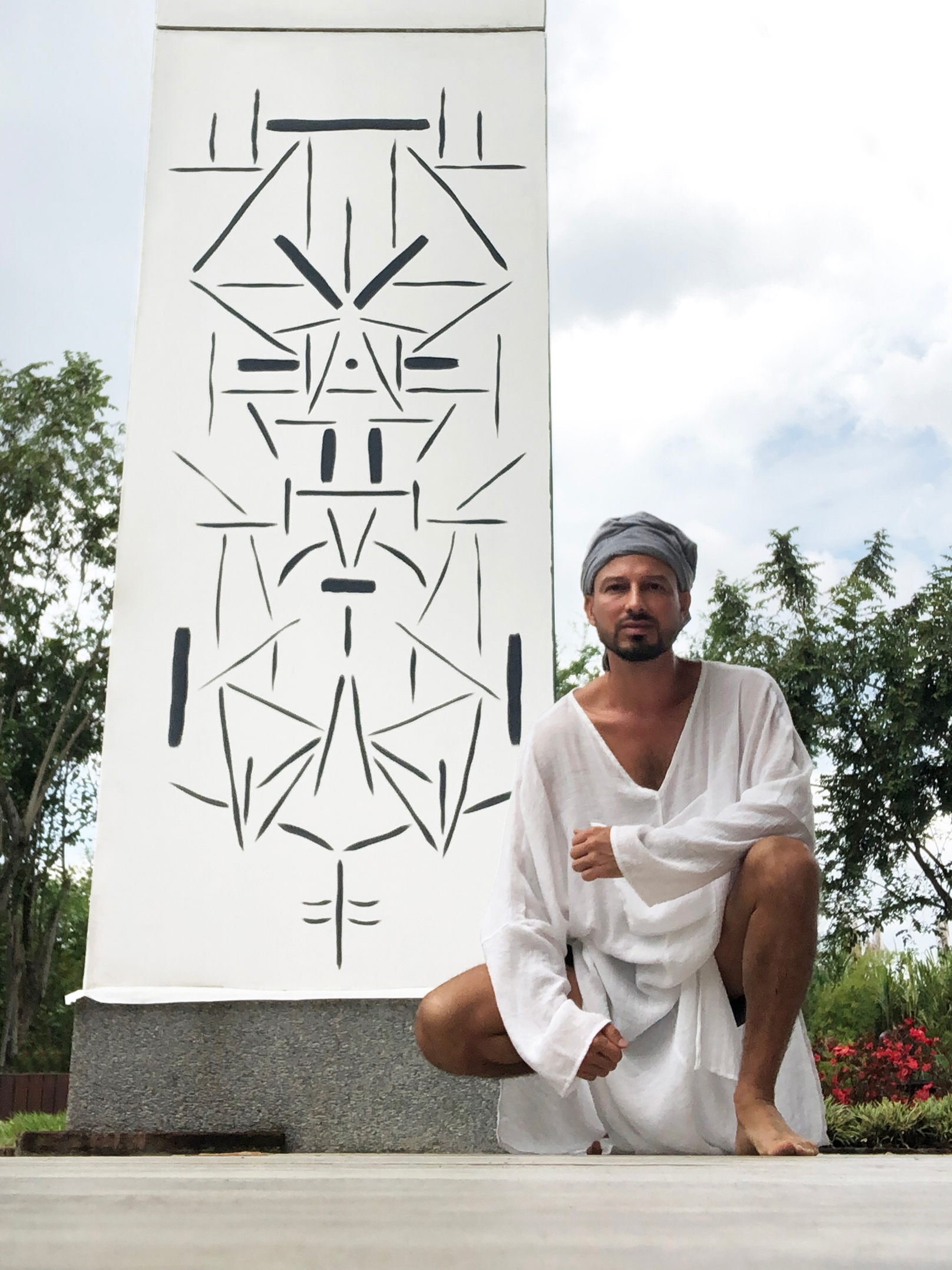
- Born: 1982 (age 43–44); Cali, Colombia
- Education: University of Miami Art Institute of Fort Lauderdale Istituto Europeo di Design Milan
- Occupations: Visual Artist, Photographer
- Notable work: Dots and Lines, Wisdom of the Century, Haiti Rediscovered,
- Website: https://www.pipeyanguas.com

Pipe Yanguas (Cali, 1982) is a Colombian visual artist based in Miami, Florida, whose contemporary art practice encompasses painting, photography, muralism, sculpture, video, and digital art. His work explores interconnectedness through a visual language composed of dots and lines and has been presented in exhibitions and cultural events in the United States and Latin America. He has also published photographic books documenting social and cultural subjects.

== Education ==
Pipe graduated from the University of Miami with a degree in Business Administration. He then studied residential design at the Art Institute of Fort Lauderdale and completed a three-year photography program at the Istituto Europeo di Design in Milan, Italy. During his time in Italy, he worked as a photographer for Vogue Italia, capturing urban style on the streets of Milan. Through his photographs, Pipe captures people's life stories and documents the passage of time by portraying their passions in everyday life.

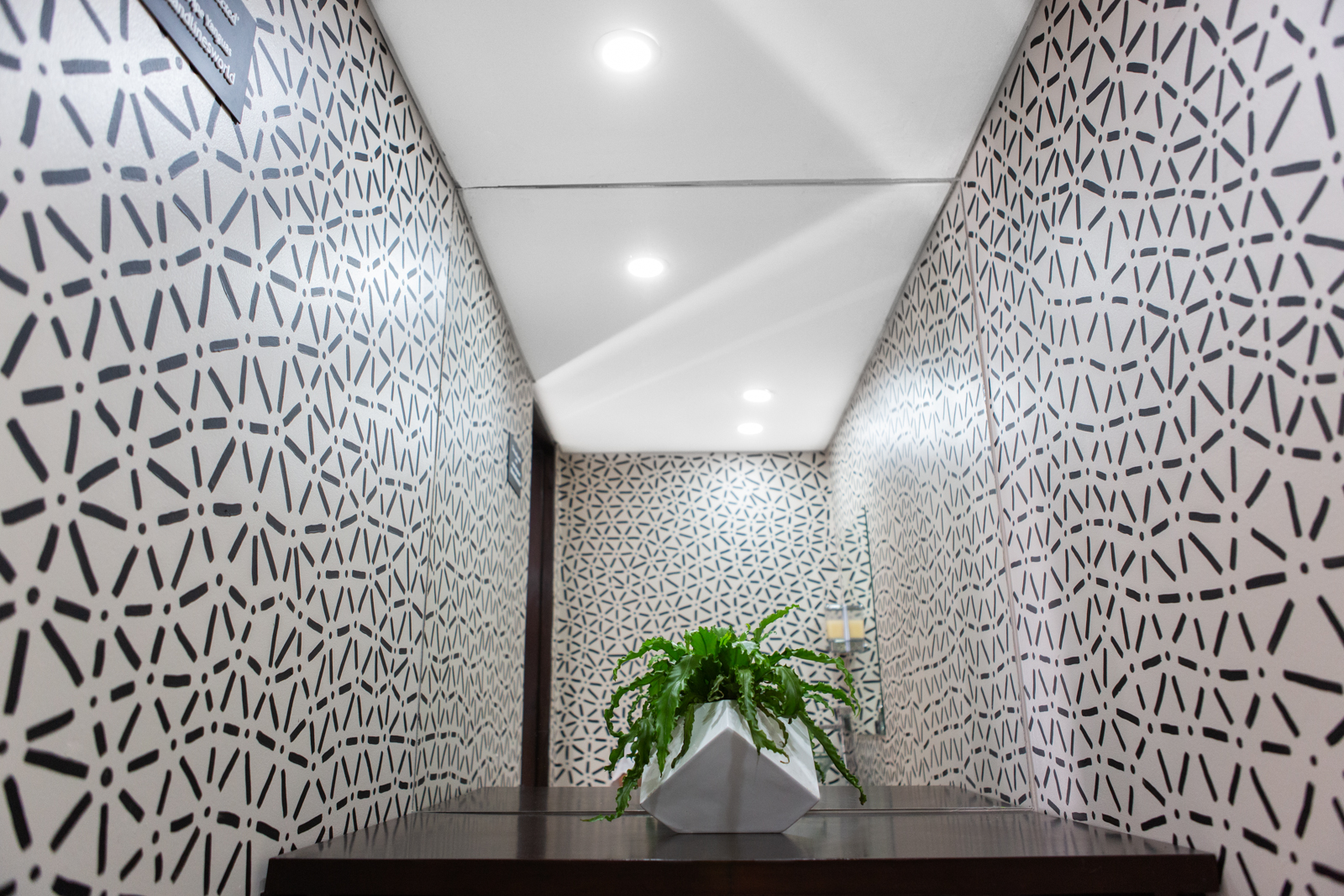
One of his Dots and Lines World murals

== Visual Artist Career ==
In 2020, he began a new artistic project as a painter, creating the "Black & White River Collection." This series consists of 36 unique pieces featuring compositions of lines and dots inspired by the natural forms of a coreid bug nymph. After photographing and drawing the insect, Yanguas interpreted the intricate network on its shell as carrying a visual message of connection, which he subsequently developed into the symbolic visual language that characterizes his paintings and public murals: Dots and Lines .

In 2021, he created a series combining photography, dots, and lines to capture the "Hacienda Cañasgordas," a cultural heritage site in Colombia. Titled Hacienda Cañasgordas: A Journey Through Its Windows and Doors, the series is on permanent display at the Historical Museum in Cali, Colombia.

Yanguas has participated in exhibitions in Miami, San Francisco, Guatemala City, Havana, and Cali, showcasing his dot and line artwork. His murals have also been installed in South Florida venues, including Carousel Studios and La Victoria in Miami’s Design District, and ArtServe in Fort Lauderdale.

As of 2026, Dots and Lines comprised four series: DNA, Day and Night, Miniature Metallic, and El Destino. Rather than representing distinct stylistic variations, these series have been interpreted as different expressions of a shared visual language.

His pieces encourage viewers to reflect on the power of the connections and bonds that unite people.

== Publications ==
In 2018, Pipe was the photographer for the book Haiti Rediscovered ISBN 978-0-9994838-0-0, by Françoise Elizée. The book documents the lives, work, and passions of twelve Haitian women and is presented as a tribute to the women of Haiti.

In 2024, he collaborated, as a photographer, with Sandra Coiffman, Jenny Menzel, and Merle R. Saferstein on the publication of the coffee table book Wisdom of the Century ISBN 979-8218494452. The book features interviews and portraits of 90 people over the age of 90, primarily Miami-Dade residents from over 20 countries. Wisdom of the Century documents the memories of a generation that has lived through wars, pandemics, migrations, and profound social and technological transformations. For the project, Yanguas visited subjects in their homes to document their lives through personal portraits, including a session with then 94-year-old artist and architect Kenneth Treister. Observing Treister still actively painting in his studio profoundly influenced Yanguas, prompting him to remark that he envisions himself continuing his artistic practice well into old age.

== Exhibitions ==
- In 2026, Yanguas participated in the Palette Project as part of the Evening of Art at the Lowe Art Museum in Miami, an annual event in which participating artists present works for a charity art auction; his work was among the selected pieces.
- During Miami Art Week 2025, he painted a mural titled "The Weave" on the exterior of La Victoria, a business in the Miami Design District in Miami, Florida. The work was completed and unveiled on December 5, 2025. Executed in a monochromatic palette, the mural features a composition of dots and lines, recurring elements in the artist's work, representing the convergence of people, stories, and relationships that unfold in the intervened space.
- He participated in the 15th Havana Biennial, organized by the Wifredo Lam Contemporary Art Center, from November 15, 2024, to February 28, 2025. Based on his concept of connectivity through dots and lines, Pipe's work was exhibited in the outdoor section called “Behind the Wall.” The pieces included a mural entitled "Nature Finds a Way," which blends in with the pre-existing imperfections of the wall, and a sculpture installation entitled "Hemoglobin," consisting of three cubic-meter-sized red pieces on a transparent acrylic base that creates a floating visual effect.
- From May 15 to June 20, 2024, Pipe held a solo exhibition entitled "Flow" at the Domo Museum of the Jorge Garcés Borrero Departmental Library in Cali. In this exhibition, Pipe presented pieces that fused painting and sculpture, immersing viewers in reflections on connections that unite people.
- In January 2023, Pipe joined the sustainable art exhibition "Art Interventions for Environmental Resilience," organized by ArtServe. The exhibition featured artists who develop and employ environmentally friendly practices. For the exhibition, he painted a mural titled "The Wave at ArtServe" on the north and west facades of the organization's headquarters. Composed of his signature dots and lines, the mural features an irregular wave painted freehand to symbolize the dynamic flow of creative ideas.
- In December 2022, he added to his "Together We Are Infinite" project with a new mural on the northwest side of ArtServe in Fort Lauderdale, Florida. This mural of dots and lines symbolizes people (dots) and their connections (lines). The undulating composition simulates the ocean waves that passersby will encounter along Sunrise Boulevard on their way to the shore.
- In October 2022, he participated in an ArtServe exhibition entitled "Narratives in Latin American Art" in Fort Lauderdale, Florida. This exhibition, which took place during Hispanic Heritage Month, featured the work of Latin American and Hispanic visual artists from twelve different countries.
- In March 2022, he created a mural titled "Cali Florece" (Cali Blooms) in collaboration with the Undersecretary of Heritage of the Ministry of Culture of Cali, Colombia. Inspired by the song "Las Caleñas Son Como Las Flores" (The Women of Cali Are Like Flowers) by the Colombian orchestra The Latin Brothers, the artist painted this mural on the old Hotel Menéndez, which is currently considered a heritage site in the city.
- In February 2022, he participated in the group exhibition "Fragmentos de la mente" (Fragments of the Mind). Inspired by people's reactions to everyday events, this exhibition was organized by the O.S. Gallery in Guatemala City. Pipe joined other contemporary artists, all of whom painted works in which the transition between form and color was the common factor.
- In 2020, he presented the mural "Street Wall Connection" in Cali's San Fernando neighborhood, marking the beginning of the "Together We Are Infinite" project. This project consists of a series of murals in different cities. Each new mural is welcomed with a variety of artistic expressions, including music, dance, acting, modeling, fashion design, and photography. Also in 2020, Pipe collaborated with Venezuelan pianist Elar and Colombian videographer Andrez Abril to produce a video art piece based on a floor mural he called "Air Connected."
- In 2013, Pipe participated in the collective exhibition "Nuestros acentos: 100 Imágenes de Iberoamérica en Miami" (Our Accents: 100 Images of Ibero-America in Miami). This event was organized by the Koubek Center to celebrate Hispanic Heritage Month and was part of the 2013 Miami Colloquium, "El Idioma Español y los Medios de Comunicación" (The Spanish Language and the Media). Noteworthy from this exhibition is the piece "COLOR ATTACHMENT Miami," a photograph taken by the artist in 2011.
- In July 2012, Pipe participated in the group exhibition "Small Works," held at the Cristina Chacón Studio Gallery in Miami, alongside other renowned artists.
