= Vuelve =

Vuelve (English: Come back) may refer to:

- Vuelve (album), a 1998 album by Ricky Martin
  - "Vuelve" (Ricky Martin song), 1998
- "Vuelve" (Daddy Yankee and Bad Bunny song), 2017
- "Vuelve" a song by Pecos Kanvas 1981
- "Vuelve", a song by Yuri from her 1983 album Yuri: Sí, soy así
- "Vuelve", a song by Luis Miguel from his 1986 album 33
- "Vuelve", a song by Carlos Vives from his 1986 album Por Fuera y Por Dentro
- "Vuelve", a song by Camilo Sesto from his 1991 album A Voluntad del Cielo
- "Vuelve", a song by Shakira from her 1995 album Pies Descalzos
- "Vuelve", a song by Joe Arroyo from his 1997 album Deja Que Te Cante
- "Vuelve", a song by Fey from her 1998 album El Color de los Sueños
- "Vuelve", a song by Intocable from their 2002 album Sueños
- "Vuelve", a song by Chayanne from his 2003 album Sangre Latina
- "Vuelve", a song by Reik from their eponymous 2005 album
- "Vuelve", a song by La Oreja de Van Gogh from their 2006 album Guapa
- "Vuelve", a song by A.B. Quintanilla y Los Kumbia All Starz from their 2008 album Planeta Kumbia
- "Vuelve", a song by C-Kan feat. MC Davo from his 2012 album Voy Por El Sueño De Muchos
- "Vuelve", a song by Julieta Venegas from her 2013 album Los Momentos
- "Vuelve", a song by Bomba Estéreo from their 2017 album Ayo
- "Vuelve", a song by Beret from his 2019 album Prisma

== See also ==
- Vuelvo (disambiguation)
