= Geotrigona subnigra =

Scientific classification
- Kingdom: Animalia
- Phylum: Arthropoda
- Class: Insecta
- Order: Hymenoptera
- Family: Apidae
- Genus: Geotrigona
- Species: G. subnigra

Binomial name
- Geotrigona subnigra (Schwarz, 1940)

Species of bee

Geotrigona subnigra is a species of eusocial stingless bee in the family Apidae and tribe Meliponini. It can be found in Brazil and Guyana.
