= Geotrigona subfulva =

Scientific classification
- Kingdom: Animalia
- Phylum: Arthropoda
- Class: Insecta
- Order: Hymenoptera
- Family: Apidae
- Genus: Geotrigona
- Species: G. subfulva

Binomial name
- Geotrigona subfulva (Camargo & Moure, 1996)

Species of bee

Geotrigona subfulva is a species of eusocial stingless bee in the family Apidae and tribe Meliponini. It can be found in Brazil and Colombia.
