= Chris Patrick (rapper) =

American rapper (born 1996)

Background information
- Also known as: SAINT, The Last Mohican
- Born: Christin Patrick; February 28, 1996 (age 30); East Orange, New Jersey, U.S.
- Education: Rider University
- Genre: East Coast hip-hop
- Occupations: Rapper; songwriter
- Years active: 2020–present
- Labels: Def Jam, CxR
- Website: chrispatrickofficial.com

Christin Patrick (born February 28, 1996), known professionally as Chris Patrick, is an American rapper from East Orange, New Jersey. His breakthrough single, "Swish," was included on the NBA 2K21 in-game soundtrack. He self-released his debut album From the Heart, Vol. 2 in December 2020, and signed to Def Jam Recordings in 2024.

In September 2025, he achieved viral breakthrough after performing a freestyle over Kendrick Lamar's "Man At The Garden" beat during Kai Cenat's Mafiathon 3 livestream. In June 2026, he appeared in XXL magazine as part of their 2026 Freshman Class.

== Early life ==
Chris Patrick was born and raised in East Orange, New Jersey. He grew up listening to artists including Mary J. Blige, Usher, Bell Biv DeVoe, The Notorious B.I.G., Jay-Z, J. Cole, Kendrick Lamar, and Drake. During his elementary school years, he felt like an outsider, where he experienced bullying. In sixth grade, he wrote his first rap, citing one of his close friends who introduced him to Lil Wayne and J. Cole, where the latter's The Sideline Story inspired him to pursue a rapping career.

He was a track and field athlete at Rider University as a hurdler and high-jumper, and became the 2016 winner of the R Factor Talent Show. During college, he went under the moniker The Last Mohican, based on the 1992 film of the same name. He explained its meaning: "I felt like I was the last of a dying breed of people who really rapped back when the whole Lil Uzi wave was up, so you got the 'ra-ra' and 'ya-ya' shit going very crazy. And then, you got me over here rapping. That's how I saw myself—The Last Mohican in the moment."

He was an opener for Travis Scott's Birds Eye View Tour. Following graduation, Patrick worked a number of jobs, including a stint at Best Buy. Upon hearing JID's "151 Rum," he decided to quit his job.

== Career ==
He released his debut album From the Heart, Vol. 2 in 2020 and began working on his next project, X-Files, the following day on December 15, 2020. His sophomore album is based on the past three years of his life. He was an opener for Russ on the European leg of his "It Was You All Along" Tour in 2024, as well as a subsequent opener for fellow rapper JID's world tour for the fall leg, ahead of his major label debut, Pray 4 Me, which was released through Def Jam Recordings on December 12.

In September 2025, he achieved viral breakthrough after performing a raw, two-part freestyle over Kendrick Lamar's "Man At The Garden" beat during Kai Cenat's Mafiathon 3 livestream. The massive online reception completely revitalized his career. His performance also earned a high-profile public co-sign from legendary rapper Nas, who praised the freestyle in an interview and told audiences to keep an eye on him.

== Artistry ==
Patrick has cited J. Cole, Kendrick Lamar, Drake, Doja Cat, Whitney Houston, SZA, Tsu Surf, Fetty Wap, JID, and Kenny Mason as influences on his music.

== Discography ==
=== Studio albums ===
List of albums, with year released
Title	Album details
From the Heart, Vol. 2	Released: December 14, 2020; Label: CxR; Format: Digital download, streaming
X-Files	Released: August 10, 2022; Label: CxR, Good Partners; Format: Digital download, streaming
Saint	Released: TBA; Label: Def Jam; Format: Digital download, streaming

=== Extended plays ===
List of extended plays, with year released
Title	Album details
Pray 4 Me	Released: December 12, 2025; Label: Def Jam; Format: Digital download, streaming

=== Mixtapes ===
List of mixtapes, with year released
Title	Album details
From The Heart, Vol. 1	Released: January 2020; Label: Self-released; Format: Streaming
The Calm	Released: April 3, 2024; Label: CxR; Format: Digital download, streaming

=== Singles ===
==== As lead artist ====
List of singles, showing year released and album name
Title	Year	Album
"Slide on Me"	2023	The Calm
"Silver and Gold"	2024	Non-album single
"Take Time for Myself"	2024	The Calm
"Mr. Fantastic"	2024	Non-album single
"Ramen Noodles"	2025	Pray 4 Me
"Frankenstein" (with Marco Plus)	2025	Pray 4 Me
"Close Range"	2026	Non-album single
"Run It Back" (featuring Mack Keane)	2026	Pray 4 Her (Deluxe)

==== Promotional ====
List of singles, showing year released and album name
Title	Year	Album
"Bigger Than Ever (We Back)"	2026	Scary Movie 6

=== Guest appearances ===
List of non-single guest appearances, with other performing artists, showing year released and album name
Title	Year	Other artist(s)	Album
"Pokemon Cypher 2019"	2019	Archer, OmarCameUp, Shofu, Tanukes, Kezura, TokenBlack, PE$O PETE, ShueTube, Scoot, Anonymuz, BlackLynk, JWittz, G.Yee, Matt Houston, CTC, VI Seconds	None
"Alley Oop"	2026	None	Goat (Original Motion Picture Soundtrack)

=== Soundtrack appearances ===
Title	Year	Album
"Swish"	2020	NBA 2K21

=== Music videos ===
Title	Year	Director
"Bag" (with Backpack Ben)	2025	Justinnla
"Ramen Noodles"	2025	Andrpw
"Frankenstein" (with Marco Plus)	2025	Andrpw
