= Vuelvo =

Vuelvo (Spanish "I return") may refer to:

- Vuelvo (album), by Erreway, or the title song, 2021
- "Vuelvo" (song), by Beto Cuevas, 2008
- "Vuelvo", a song by Yurena, 2005

== See also ==
- Vuelve (disambiguation)
