= Geotrigona aequinoctialis =

Scientific classification
- Domain: Eukaryota
- Kingdom: Animalia
- Phylum: Arthropoda
- Class: Insecta
- Order: Hymenoptera
- Family: Apidae
- Genus: Geotrigona
- Species: G. aequinoctialis

Binomial name
- Geotrigona aequinoctialis (Ducke, 1925)

Species of bee

Geotrigona aequinoctialis is a species of eusocial stingless bee in the family Apidae and tribe Meliponini.
