= Geotrigona fulvohirta =

Scientific classification
- Kingdom: Animalia
- Phylum: Arthropoda
- Class: Insecta
- Order: Hymenoptera
- Family: Apidae
- Genus: Geotrigona
- Species: G. fulvohirta

Binomial name
- Geotrigona fulvohirta (Friese, 1900)

Species of bee

Geotrigona fulvohirta is a species of eusocial stingless bee in the family Apidae and tribe Meliponini. It can be found in Bolivia, Brazil, Colombia, Ecuador, and Peru.
