= Geotrigona joearroyoi =

Scientific classification
- Kingdom: Animalia
- Phylum: Arthropoda
- Class: Insecta
- Order: Hymenoptera
- Family: Apidae
- Genus: Geotrigona
- Species: G. joearroyoi

Binomial name
- Geotrigona joearroyoi (Gonzalez & Engel, 2012)

Species of bee

Geotrigona joearroyoi is a species of eusocial stingless bee in the family Apidae and tribe Meliponini. It can be found on the Caribbean coast of Colombia, and was named after Joe Arroyo, who could also be found there before he died in 2011.
