= En Barranquilla me quedo =

Single by Joe Arroyo, La Verdad

from the album Fuego en mi mente
- Language: Spanish
- English title: In Barranquilla I Will Stay
- Recorded: July 25, 1988; 38 years ago
- Studio: Discos Fuentes
- Genre: Salsa
- Length: 5:10
- Songwriter: Álvaro José Arroyo González
- Producers: Isaac Villanueva, Álvaro José Arroyo González

"En Barranquilla me quedo" (I'm staying in Barranquilla) is a salsa song sung by Joe Arroyo. It appears on his 1989 album Fuego en mi mente. The song is an ode to Baranquilla, Colombia.

The song was recorded on July 25, 1988, in a two-hour session. Earlier that day, Arroyo, the pianist and arranger Chelito De Castro, and 12 musicians that formed the musical group La Verdad met at Arroyo's residence in the Ciudad Jardín neighborhood of Barranquilla. Together, they finally mapped out the song that Arroyo had been ruminating on for several days. According to Chelito, after attending a funeral over the weekend, Arroyo told him that he wanted to write a song about Barranquilla, with the first lines already written. Arroyo asked Chelito to work on an introduction, which became the chords that the song is known for.

== In popular culture ==
Shakira (originally from Barranquilla, Colombia) performed the song at the 2011 Latin Grammys when she won Person of the Year.

When the character Abuela asks for music, Agustin plays the initial chords of the song. Composer Germaine Franco further worked the song instrumentally into the film's score.
