= Geotrigona kraussi =

Scientific classification
- Kingdom: Animalia
- Phylum: Arthropoda
- Class: Insecta
- Order: Hymenoptera
- Family: Apidae
- Genus: Geotrigona
- Species: G. kraussi

Binomial name
- Geotrigona kraussi (Schwarz, 1951)

Species of bee

Geotrigona kraussi is a species of eusocial stingless bee in the family Apidae and tribe Meliponini. It can be found in Panama.
