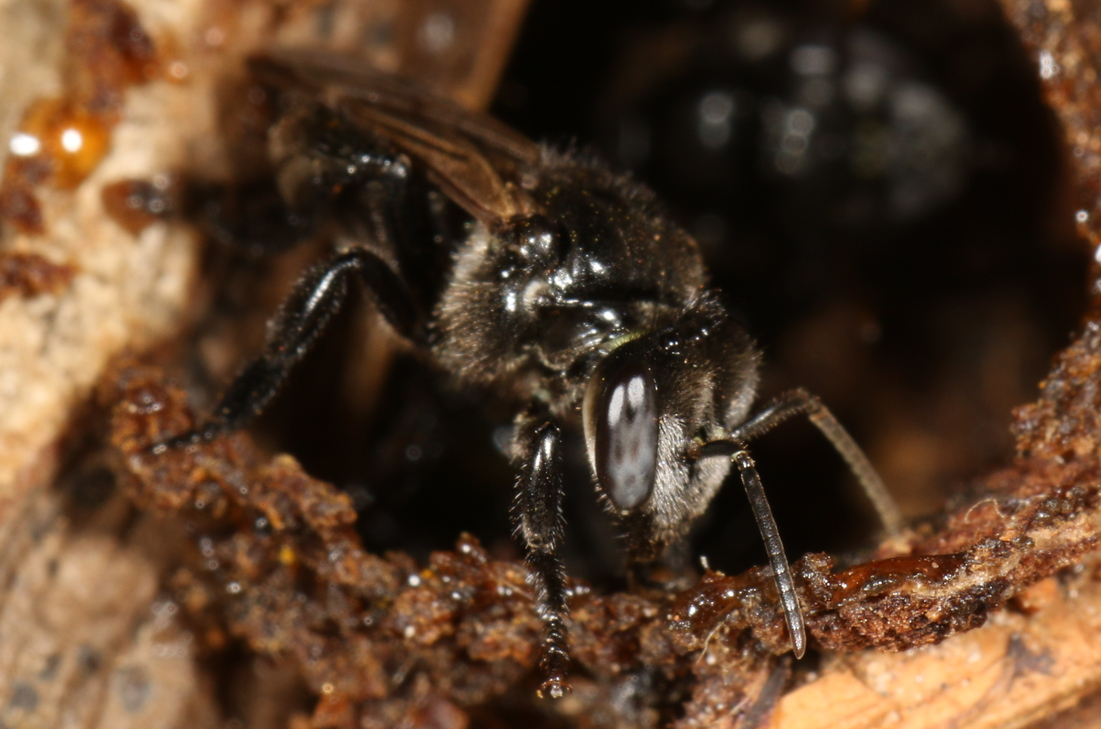

Scientific classification
- Kingdom: Animalia
- Phylum: Arthropoda
- Class: Insecta
- Order: Hymenoptera
- Family: Apidae
- Genus: Geotrigona
- Species: G. mombuca

Binomial name
- Geotrigona mombuca (Smith, 1863)
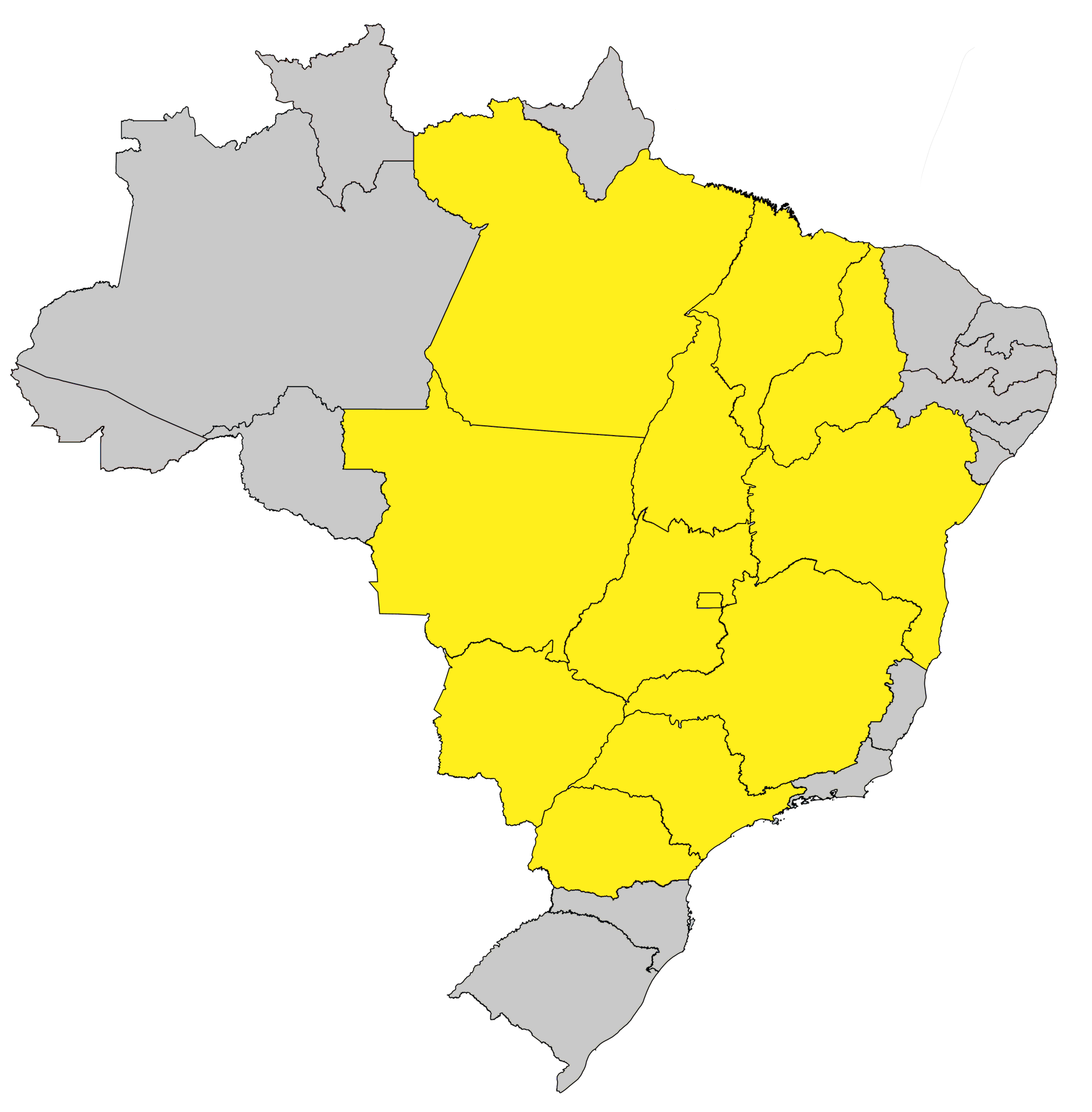
- Distribution of G. mombuca in Brazil

= Geotrigona mombuca =

Species of bee

Geotrigona mombuca (also called mombuca in Brazilian Portuguese) is a species of eusocial stingless bee in the family Apidae and tribe Meliponini. It can be found in Brazil and Paraguay.
