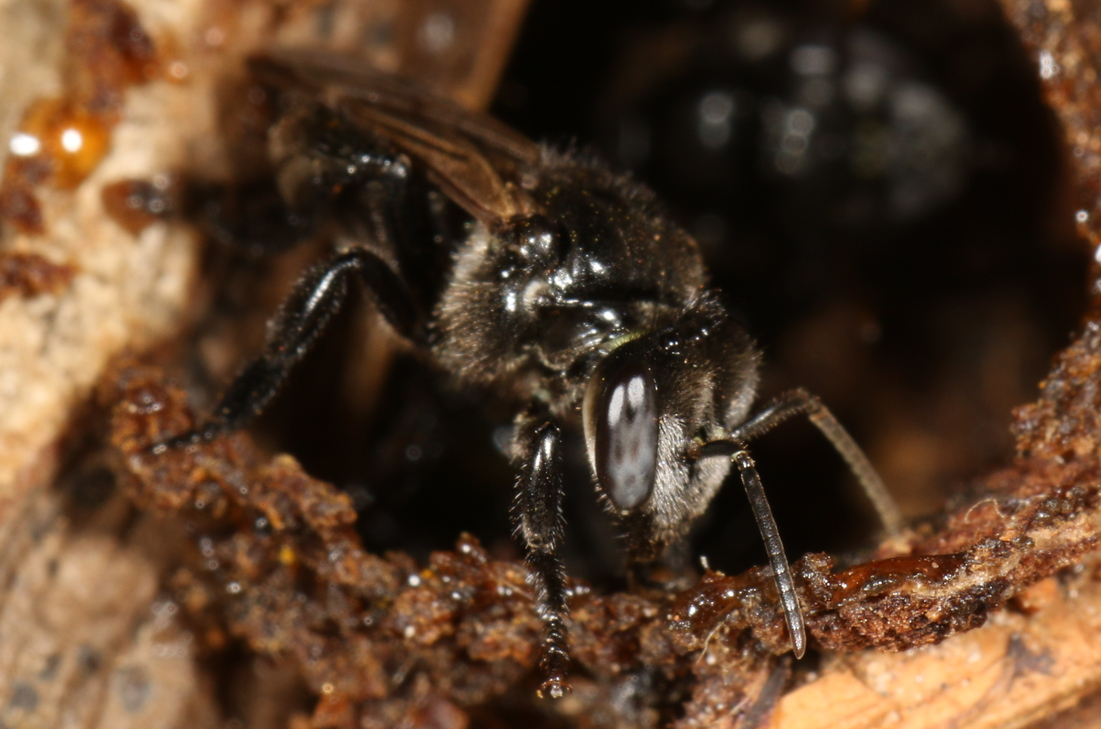
- Geotrigona mombuca in Brazil

Scientific classification
- Domain: Eukaryota
- Kingdom: Animalia
- Phylum: Arthropoda
- Class: Insecta
- Order: Hymenoptera
- Family: Apidae
- Tribe: Meliponini
- Genus: Geotrigona; Moure, 1943

= Geotrigona =

Genus of bees

Geotrigona is a genus of bees belonging to the family Apidae.

The species of this genus are found in South America.

Species:

- Geotrigona acapulconis (Strand, 1919)
- Geotrigona aequinoctialis (Ducke, 1925)
- Geotrigona argentina (Camargo & Moure, 1996)
- Geotrigona chiriquiensis (Schwarz, 1951)
- Geotrigona fulvatra (Camargo & Moure, 1996)
- Geotrigona fulvohirta (Friese, 1900)
- Geotrigona fumipennis (Camargo & Moure, 1996)
- Geotrigona joearroyoi (Gonzalez & Engel, 2012)
- Geotrigona kaba (Gonzalez & Sepúlveda, 2007)
- Geotrigona kraussi (Schwarz, 1951)
- Geotrigona kwyrakai (Camargo & Moure, 1996)
- Geotrigona leucogastra (Cockerell, 1914)
- Geotrigona lutzi (Camargo & Moure, 1996)
- Geotrigona mattogrossensis (Ducke, 1925)
- Geotrigona mombuca (Smith, 1863)
- Geotrigona subfulva (Camargo & Moure, 1996)
- Geotrigona subgrisea (Cockerell, 1920)
- Geotrigona subnigra (Schwarz, 1940)
- Geotrigona subterranea (Friese, 1901)
- Geotrigona tellurica (Camargo & Moure, 1996)
- Geotrigona terricola (Camargo & Moure, 1996)
- Geotrigona xanthopoda (Camargo & Moure, 1996)
