= Goat (soundtrack) =

Soundtrack and score to the 2026 film

Goat (Original Motion Picture Soundtrack) and Goat (Original Motion Picture Score) are the two musical projects released to promote the 2026 film Goat directed by Tyree Dillihay for Columbia Pictures and Sony Pictures Animation. The first album features original songs for the film, released through Mercury Records on February 6, 2026. The second album contains the original score composed by Kris Bowers, released on February 13, 2026, through Sony Classical and Milan Records.

== Original soundtrack ==
Goat (Original Motion Picture Soundtrack)

Soundtrack album by various artists
- Released: February 6, 2026
- Recorded: 2026
- Genres: Hip-hop; pop; rock; R&B
- Length: 42:15
- Label: Mercury

=== Background ===
The soundtrack was announced on January 21, 2026. The album features contributions from V.I.C., Jelly Roll, Quinn XCII, Flo, Joey Valence & Brae, Cortis, and Ayra Starr, among others.

=== Reception ===
Robert Stukowski of PopGeeks wrote how "the soundtrack reflects basketball's broad cross-demographic appeal," while Rosa Delegano of Shatter the Standards was less positive, assessing, "[the album] has two or three contributions that carry the residue of an actual life outside a recording booth, and a dozen others apparently drafted with a whiteboard of approved emotions and a two-and-a-half-minute timer."

=== Track listing ===
| No. | Title | Artist(s) | Length |
|---|---|---|---|
| 1. | "Overtime" | V.I.C. | 2:35 |
| 2. | "I'm Good" | Jelly Roll | 3:00 |
| 3. | "Best Day" | Quinn XCII | 2:22 |
| 4. | "Mamacitas" | Flo | 3:27 |
| 5. | "Hooligang" | Joey Valence & Brae | 2:48 |
| 6. | "Alley Oop" | Chris Patrick | 3:04 |
| 7. | "Crazy" | PartyOf2 | 2:27 |
| 8. | "Goat Tears" | Aaron Pierre; Gregory Fletcher | 0:39 |
| 9. | "WYA" | Russ; Sosocamo | 1:48 |
| 10. | "Grandmaster" | Trueno | 2:28 |
| 11. | "That's My Squad" | GOAT Cast; Jasper Ross | 0:42 |
| 12. | "Meets the Eye" | KAIRO | 2:23 |
| 13. | "Don't Dream It's Over" | Bryant Barnes | 3:13 |
| 14. | "Mention Me" | Cortis | 3:00 |
| 15. | "Brought the Family" | Jon Bellion; Ayra Starr | 3:01 |
| 16. | "Afro" (Bonus) | Lil Naay | 2:46 |
| 17. | "World Go Round" | Kole; Natania | 2:32 |
| Total length: | | | 42:15 |

=== Charts ===
Chart performance for Goat (Original Motion Picture Soundtrack)
| Chart (2026) | Peak position |
|---|---|
| UK Album Downloads (Official Charts) | 45 |
| UK Soundtrack Albums (Official Charts) | 41 |
| US Soundtrack Albums (Billboard) | 23 |

== Original score ==
Goat (Original Motion Picture Score)

Soundtrack album by Kris Bowers
- Released: February 13, 2026
- Recorded: 2026
- Genre: Film score
- Length: 62:39
- Labels: Sony Classical; Milan
- Producers: Kris Bowers; Max Wrightson; Dana Sano (exec.)

Kris Bowers chronology
| The Eyes of Ghana (2025) | Goat (2026) | The Punisher: One Last Kill (2026) |

=== Background ===
The film score was released through Sony Classical and Milan Records on February 13, 2026.

Kris Bowers, who composed the score for Goat, was originally concerned early in his career of being restricted as a Black composer who "can only write Black music." However, he felt comfortable in his role for Goat, given the freedom to create music he listened to growing up. The score incorporates influences of pop, hip-hop, and R&B music.

The music was designed to match the animation and visual style. Bowers recalled how the late basketball player, Kobe Bryant, had advised him to approach film music with a childlike wonder and took inspiration from John Williams' work; as a result, the score emphasizes heavy use of orchestra, especially in the roarball sequences.

=== Reception ===
Owen Gleiberman of Variety and Frank Scheck of The Hollywood Reporter regarded Bowers' score as "exciting" and "fascinating". Daniel Howat of Next Best Picture penned, "combined with a killer soundtrack and a strong score by Kris Bowers, the film's overall vibe is electric."

=== Track listing ===
| No. | Title | Length |
|---|---|---|
| 1. | "Good Morning Vineland" | 1:12 |
| 2. | "Look Who It Is" | 1:26 |
| 3. | "Long Walk Home" | 1:30 |
| 4. | "Jett Fuel" | 1:17 |
| 5. | "First One in the Gym" | 1:58 |
| 6. | "Chillin' in a Penthouse" | 1:21 |
| 7. | "TV in the Mini Bar" | 1:47 |
| 8. | "Mane Season" | 1:49 |
| 9. | "That's Gonna Be Me" | 0:35 |
| 10. | "The Cage" | 0:32 |
| 11. | "Flo" | 1:16 |
| 12. | "Gonna Need That Rent" | 0:39 |
| 13. | "Will's Got Next" | 1:29 |
| 14. | "Glue Factory" | 2:06 |
| 15. | "Two-Horned Unicorn" | 1:53 |
| 16. | "Morning Routine" | 1:39 |
| 17. | "Medium Dreams Come True" | 0:39 |
| 18. | "Not Even Media-trained" | 2:08 |
| 19. | "Not Bad, Right?" | 1:41 |
| 20. | "Just Study the Playbook" | 1:21 |
| 21. | "Roarball" | 0:41 |
| 22. | "That's a Technical" | 0:58 |
| 23. | "The Whole Planet's Watching" | 1:12 |
| 24. | "Eagle 24" | 0:57 |
| 25. | "Commercial Break" | 0:52 |
| 26. | "It's a Double Goat Meaning" | 0:32 |
| 27. | "No Love" | 1:46 |
| 28. | "The Locals" | 1:33 |
| 29. | "She Said to Dream Big" | 1:57 |
| 30. | "Jett's Got Bars" | 1:31 |
| 31. | "Did You Mean It?" | 0:36 |
| 32. | "Coach Dennis" | 0:50 |
| 33. | "Welcome to Dennis' World of Pain" | 2:52 |
| 34. | "Birds of a Feather Look Fly Together" | 0:46 |
| 35. | "I Never Joke About Money" | 1:30 |
| 36. | "Just Give Me the Ball" | 3:34 |
| 37. | "What Really Matters" | 1:43 |
| 38. | "Ready, Set, GOAT" | 1:18 |
| 39. | "Halftime" | 1:13 |
| 40. | "Dream Big" | 0:45 |
| 41. | "All Tied Up" | 1:12 |
| 42. | "Maniacs" | 1:30 |
| 43. | "I've Got a Game to Win" | 0:57 |
| 44. | "Fate of the Universe on the Line" | 2:05 |
| 45. | "Roots Run Deep" | 1:31 |
| Total length: | | 62:39 |

=== Credits ===
Credits adapted from Film Music Reporter:

- Music composer: Kris Bowers
- Music producer: Kris Bowers, Max Wrightson
- Additional music: Thomas Kotocheff
- Music supervisor: Sarah Bromberg
- Executive music producer: Dana Sano
- Music editors: DeVaughn Watts, Del Spiva
- Score recording and mixing: Scott Michael Smith
- Score engineer: Craig Beckett
- Digital score recordist: Liam Moses
- Music contractors: Alex Henery, Michele O'Young, Click Track Music
- Orchestra conductor: Christopher Gordon
- Lead orchestrators: Gregory Jamrok, Abraham Libbos, Josef Zimmerman
- Orchestrators: Cara Baterna, Andrew Rowan, Zach Yaholkovsky, Michael Kallin, Juan Arbodela, Max Fourmy
- Music preparation: Fine Line Music Service, Carolyn Burke, Jina Choi, Jennifer Fagre, Vincent Fasano, Daniel Gold, Bill Newlin, Meggan Quinn, Naomi Sato, Juliann Xu
- Synth programmers: Andrew Kawczynski, Matthew Wang, Benjamin Howell
- Score coordinators: Peter Lu, Elaine Beckett
- Score technical engineer: Sahil Jindal
- Vocal contractor: Jasper Randall
- Choir conductor: Gregory Jamrok
- Choir recording: Alan Meyerson
- Choir digital recordist: Keith Ukrisna
