= Sonora Carruseles =

Colombian salsa band

- Origin: Medellín, Colombia
- Genres: Heavy Salsa and Boogaloo
- Years active: 1995-Present
- Label: Miami Records / Discos Fuentes
- Members: Morist Jimenez Jr. (Musical Director), Daniel Marmolejo (Singer), Leonardo Sierra (Singer), Luis "Taquito" Ruíz (Singer), Jans Certuche (Singer), Luis Rodriguez (Bass), Horacio Miramontes (Piano), Hamilton Murillo (Timbal), Diego Camacho (Bongos), Yasmani Roque (Trompeta), Gerardo Rodriguez (Trompeta), Raul Rodriguez (Trompeta)
- Website: https://www.facebook.com/sonoracarruselesband?ref=hl

La Sonora Carruseles is a salsa band originating in 1995 from Colombia. They are currently established in Medellín.

Their music has been featured in televised competitions such as So You Think You Can Dance. In August 2015, U.S. president Barack Obama included the group's song "La Salsa la Traigo Yo!" on his personal #POTUS playlist which created significant international interest in the band.

== Beginnings ==
Sonora Carruseles was grouped in the Colombian city of Medellín in 1995. They originally started as an experiment for Mario Rincón "Pachanga", who was musical director at a Colombia-based record company, Discos Fuentes. After a sound rehearsal, the project was approved and an album was released that same year. The group has released an album every few years and traveled most of Europe and Latin America. It is now half Colombian, with other members from Latin American countries.

=== Reception ===
Sonora Carruseles has been received well in many Spanish-speaking countries.

== Discography ==
Albums

Sonora Carruseles has released many albums over the years.

- Espectacular, (1995)
- Salsa y Fuego, (1996)
- Heavy Salsa, (1998)
- Con Todos Los Hierros, (2000)
- De Una Vez Gozando, (2002)
- La Salsa La Traigo Yo, (2003)
- Que No Pare la Rumba, (2004)
- Somos los Duros de la Salsa, (2006)
- Mucho Mejor, (2008)
- Maestro de la Salsa Dura, (2009)
- Rumba Dura, "(2012)"
- Salsa Pa'l Mundo "(2013)"
- Live "(2014)"
- Se Prendió La Rumba "(2015)"

Contributing artist

- The Rough Guide to Salsa (1997, World Music Network)
