= Geotrigona kwyrakai =

Scientific classification
- Domain: Eukaryota
- Kingdom: Animalia
- Phylum: Arthropoda
- Class: Insecta
- Order: Hymenoptera
- Family: Apidae
- Genus: Geotrigona
- Species: G. kwyrakai

Binomial name
- Geotrigona kwyrakai (Camargo & Moure, 1996)

Species of bee

Geotrigona kwyrakai is a species of eusocial stingless bee in the family Apidae and tribe Meliponini.
