= Polibio Mayorga =

Ecuadorian musician and songwriter

- Also known as: Junior y su Equipo; Lupe Meléndez
- Born: Luis Polibio Mayorga Acurio; 19 January 1932 (age 94); Ambato, Ecuador
- Genres: tropical music, chicha
- Instruments: accordion, keyboard, Moog synthesizer

Luis Polibio Mayorga Acurio, known as Polibio Mayorga, is an Ecuadorian songwriter, accordionist, and keyboardist. In the 1960s and 1970s Mayorga was a prolific writer and performer of tropical music in Ecuador. His 1967 song "Cumbia Triste" is considered the first original Ecuadorian cumbia.

Mayorga released music under his own name and under pseudonyms, as well as with the groups Quinteto Casino and Los Locos del Ritmo. For a time in the 1970s Mayorga was artistic director of Quito record labels Fadisa and Profona.

== Biography ==
Polibio Mayorga was born in Chisalata (now called Atahualpa), a neighbourhood of Ambato, Ecuador, on 19 January 1932. He learned to play keyboard on the organ salvaged from a church that was destroyed in the 1949 Ambato earthquake.

Mayorga's first recordings were made on a public radio show called "Canciones del Ecuador". From 1966 to 1969 he led the Quinteto Casino. Mayorga's 1967 song "Cumbia Triste" is considered the first original Ecuadorian cumbia. The song was internationally successful, and was later covered by several artists, including Lisandro Meza, Los Hispanos, and Sonido Gallo Negro. In 1969 Mayorga was invited to join Quito band Los Locos del Ritmo, and he played with them until 1972.

On a trip to New York, Mayorga bought a Moog synthesizer. His first song to feature the Moog was the 1974 hit "Ponchito de Colores", which he says was composed by his wife. Vice wrote that the success of the song "was so resounding that other tropical bands of the time soon covered it, among them the Colombian group Afrosound." The Moog featured heavily on Mayorga's 1974 album La Farra Es Aquí.

In 1973 Mayorga left Los Locos del Ritmo and became the musical director of Quito record label Fadisa (Fábrica de Discos, S.A.). There he released – and often played on – records such as A Mi Maestra Con Cariño (1976) by Olmedo Torres, his bandmate from Los Locos del Ritmo. Mayorga also worked at label Profona (Producciones Fonográficas Nacionales).

At one point Mayorga was so dominant in the Ecuadorian music charts that he started releasing music under pseudonyms, to give the illusion of variety. The pseudonyms included Lupe Meléndez and Junior y su Equipo.

Mayorga has lived in the United States since 1985. In 2023 a compilation of Mayorga's work from the 1970s called Ecuatoriana: El Universo Paralelo de Polibio Mayorga 1969–1981 was released by German record label Analog Africa. Mojo described the compilation as a "madcap sonic tale of one man's mission to modernise the Ecuadorian music scene."

== Musical style ==
Mayorga wrote music in a wide range of styles. His early successes were with tropical music, particularly the Colombian styles of porro and cumbia. He helped to develop the style of Andean cumbia, also called chicha, in Ecuador. Vice writes that Mayorga also recorded sanjuanitos, pasillos, tangos, boleros, and vallenatos.

Notable compositions of Mayorga's include "Cumbia Triste" (considered the first original Ecuadorian cumbia) as well as "Con Mi Guitarra", "Maridito de Oro", "Casita de Pobres" and "El Agua Loca".

== Discography ==
=== Albums ===
- La Farra Es Aquí (1974)

=== Compilations ===
- Ecuatoriana: El Universo Paralelo de Polibio Mayorga 1969–1981 (2023, Analog Africa)
