= Geotrigona lutzi =

Scientific classification
- Kingdom: Animalia
- Phylum: Arthropoda
- Class: Insecta
- Order: Hymenoptera
- Family: Apidae
- Genus: Geotrigona
- Species: G. lutzi

Binomial name
- Geotrigona lutzi (Camargo & Moure, 1996)

Species of bee

Geotrigona lutzi is a species of eusocial stingless bee in the family Apidae and tribe Meliponini. It can be found in Costa Rica, El Salvador, Guatemala, Honduras, and Nicaragua.
