= El Preso =

Single by Fruko y sus Tesos
- Released: 1975
- Studio: Discos Fuentes
- Genre: Salsa
- Songwriter: Álvaro Velásquez

"El Preso" (translation "the prisoner") is a song recorded by Fruko y sus Tesos. It was released in 1975 with vocals by Wilson Saoko. The song was composed by the band's percussionist Álvaro Velásquez.

The lyrics are the narration of a prisoner ("preso") serving 30 years. The actual inspiration for songwriter Velásquez was a friend's letter describing another friend's pain being jailed for 30 years on a drug charge. In an interview, Julio Ernesto Estrada (aka Fruko) said it "became a world anthem of salsa music".

Radio Nacional de Colombia also called the song a "universal hymn of salsa."

The song has also been recognized as one of the greatest Colombian songs of all time by multiple media sources:

- In its list of the ten most iconic Colombian songs, El Nuevo Siglo, rated La Pollera Colorá at No. 10.
- It was selected by Hip Latina in 2017 as one of the "13 Old School Songs Every Colombian Grew Up Listening To"; the publication wrote that "the infectious beat will have you dancing quite freely."
- In its list of the 50 best Colombian songs of all time, El Tiempo, Colombia's most widely circulated newspaper, ranked the song at No. 41.
- It was selected by Billboard in 2018 as one of the "15 Best Salsa Songs Ever".
