= Pallante =

Pallante is a surname. Notable people with the surname include:

- Aladdin Pallante (1912–1970), American actor and musician
- Andre Pallante (born 1998), American baseball player
- Maria Pallante (born 1964), American attorney
- Pablo Pallante (born 1979), Uruguayan footballer
