= En Sol Mayor =

Studio album by Joe Arroyo
- Released: December 3, 1999
- Genres: Tropical, Salsa
- Label: Sony Music Colombia

Joe Arroyo albums chronology
Cruzando el Milenio (1998)	En Sol Mayor (1999)	Marcando Terreno (2001)

En Sol Mayor (In G Major) is the nineteenth studio album by Colombian musician singer-songwriter Joe Arroyo, released by Sony Music Colombia on December 3, 1999. Is one of the last albums with the sign "Sony Music", the album contains tropical mixes that shared with folk rhythms. The single "Sabré Olvidar" had a successful in Colombia, being a cover of the American salsa band, "The TnT Band".

== Track listing ==
No.	Title	Writer(s)	Length
1.	"Sabré Olvidar ("I'll Know to Forget")"	Tito Ramos, Tonny Rojas	4:13
2.	"Feliz Contigo ("Happy with You")"	Rolando Altamar	3:41
3.	"La Tortuga ("The Turtle")"	D.R.A.	5:08
4.	"Panamá Me Tombe"	Guydu Rosies	5:44
5.	"La Amaré ("I Will Love Her")"	Mari Cruz Ponce	3:52
6.	"Rosa"	Joe Arroyo	5:04
7.	"¿Y Qué Mi Socio?"	Pablo Cairo	3:53
8.	"Adiós Fulana ("Goodbye Girl")"	Antonio María Peñaloza	3:31
9.	"Soy el Folclor ("I'm the Folk")"	Luis Cujía	4:03

== Credits and personnel ==
Credits for En Sol Mayor adapted from Allmusic and liner notes.

=== Musicians ===
- Joe Arroyo – composer, vocals
- Juan Carlos Acosta – background vocals
- Maurico Daltaire – background vocals
- Luis Moyano – background vocals
- Juan Piña – background vocals
- Emiliano Zuleta – accordion
- Armando Castro – caja
- Carlos Piña – background vocals, saxophone
- Roberto Meza – keyboards
- Ramón Benítez – drums, trombone
- Alfonso Puello – guache, percussion, tambor alegre, tambora, telephone voice
- Carlos Huertas – guitar
- Jorge Bermúdez – saxophone tenor

=== Production ===
- Iván Cardenas – engineer, mixing
- Daniel Lopéz – engineer, mixing
- Humberto Chaparro – engineer
- Rolando Altamar – composer
- Pablo Cairo – composer
- Tito Ramos – composer
