= Deja Que Te Cante =

Studio album by Joe Arroyo
- Released: November 26, 1997
- Genres: Tropical, Salsa
- Label: Sony Music Colombia

Joe Arroyo albums chronology
Reinando en Vida (1996)	Deja Que Te Cante (1997)	Cruzando el Milenio (1998)

Deja Que Te Cante (Let Me Sing You) is the seventeenth studio album by Colombian musician singer-songwriter Joe Arroyo. It was released by Sony Music Colombia on November 26, 1997. The most successful songs were "Ella y Tú" and "Mosaico Lo de la Chula".

== Track listing ==
No.	Title	Writer(s)	Length
1.	"Deja Que Te Cante ("Let Me Sing You")"	Álvaro José Arroyo	3:02
2.	"Mosaico Lo de la Chula": "Tamarindo Seco"; "La Garrapata"; "La Mata de Patilla"	Santiago Ortega, D.R.A.
3.	"Ulala Cartagena"	D.R.A.	4:13
4.	"Blanco y Negro ("Black and White")"	Julio Jeremías Rivas	4:59
5.	"Ella y Tú ("She and You")"	Felipe Peláez	4:00
6.	"La Ponzoña"	Luis Vega Roca	3:25
7.	"No Sé Vivir Sin Ti ("I Don't Know Live Without You")"	Luis A. Lambis	4:08
8.	"No Tanto"	Álvaro José Arroyo	3:28
9.	"Vuelve"	Alberto Galán	3:51
Total length:			30:06
