= El Súper Joe =

Studio album by Joe Arroyo
- Released: September 14, 2007
- Genres: Cumbia, Salsa, Joeson, Tropical
- Language: Spanish
- Label: Discos Fuentes

Joe Arroyo albums chronology
Se Armo la Moña en Carnaval (2005)	El Súper Joe (2007)

El Súper Joe (The Super Joe) is the twenty-second and last studio album by Colombian musician singer-songwriter Joe Arroyo, released on September 14, 2007. Under the label Discos Fuentes. In 2008 the album received a Latin Grammy Award nomination as Best Contemporary Tropical Album.

== Track listing ==
No.	Title	Writer(s)	Length
1.	"Fue Tu Mirada ("It Was Your Look")"	Dubis Leonor Castilla	3:54
2.	"Mi Negra Va a Gozar"	D.R.A.	3:23
3.	"Canta Joe"	Victor del Real	4:29
4.	"Quiero Felicidad ("I Want Happiness")"	Luis Vega Roca	5:19
5.	"Mamá Pacha"	Rolando Altamar, Romualdo Gracia	4:20
6.	"Locura de Amor ("Madness of Love")"	Gerardo Varela	4:05
7.	"El Macaco"	Sergio Francisco Hurtado, Victor del Real	4:57
8.	"Lo Que Siento ("What I Feel")"	Rolando Altamar, Romualdo Gracia	4:20
9.	"Los Trabalenguas"; 9.1. "El Disco se Rayó (Empújate la Aguja)"; 9.2. "Pablo y Pabla"; 9.3. "El Tamarindo"; 9.4. "La Adivinanza"; 9.5. "Tres Tigres"	Carlos Román, Eliseo Herrera	3:58
10.	"Siempre Contigo ("Always With You")"	Luis Lambis	4:14

Bonus tracks "Joe de colección"
No.	Title	Writer(s)	Length
11.	"Kuka"	William Espejo	4:30
12.	"Las 20 Caras (Juana Tengo Un Dolor)"	Ricardo Ojeda	4:35
13.	"Mundo Cruel"	Álvaro Jose Arroyo	4:26
14.	"Todo Acabó"	Mateo Torres	4:50
15.	"Ayúdala Por Favor"	Mike Char	4:32
