= Se Armo la Moña en Carnaval =

Studio album by Joe Arroyo
- Released: May 10, 2005
- Genres: Cumbia, Chandé, Fandango, Salsa, Joeson
- Label: Discos Fuentes

Joe Arroyo albums chronology
Live! (2004)	Se Armo la Moña en Carnaval (2005)	El Súper Joe (2007)

Se Armo la Moña en Carnaval (The Party is Started in Carnival) is the twenty first studio album by Colombian musician singer-songwriter Joe Arroyo, released by Discos Fuentes on May 10, 2005. The album is innovative for Arroyo's music, because the song "Reggaeson Son Son" is a Reggaeton and alludes to the Carnival of Barranquilla.

== Track listing ==
No.	Title	Length
1.	"La Moña ("The Disorder")"	4:35
2.	"Yo ("Me")"	3:53
3.	"Está Pegao (La Invitación)"	4:22
4.	"Reggaeson Son Son"	3:42
5.	"A Fulana ("To Girl")"	3:39
6.	"El Trato ("The Treatment")"	4:34
7.	"El Palo ("The Bat")"	3:18
8.	"Dolores Tiene un Piano ("Dolores Has a Piano")"	2:32
9.	"Las Mujeres ("The Women")"	2:49
10.	"Amanecemos Si ("We Woke If")"	3:26
11.	"Papa Noel"	5:33
