= Fruko y sus Tesos =

Colombian salsa group

Fruko y sus Tesos is a salsa group from Colombia that is popular in both Latin America and the United States. It was formed in 1969 by multi-instrumentalist Julio Ernesto Estrada (a.k.a. Fruko). Beginning with Tesura in 1969, the band has recorded 42 albums to date. The band achieved a degree of success after Joe Arroyo was recruited as lead singer in 1973.

A Medellín native, Julio Ernesto "Fruko" Estrada Rincón grew up listening to tango and corrido, genres associated in his neighbourhood with "maleantes" (delinquents), "camorristas" (troublemakers) and "despechados" (heartbreak people). After being expelled from school for fighting, he began his musical career at the age of 15 as a studio musician for the record label Discos Fuentes. Noticed by Lisandro Meza, Estrada was added to Meza's popular group, Los Corraleros de Majagual. In 1968, Los Corraleros traveled to New York City giving Fruko his first opportunity to experience the city's burgeoning salsa scene. Fruko was influenced by New York City's salsa greats Richie Ray, Willie Colon, Ray Barretto, and Eddie Palmieri. In the 1970s, Estrada helped mold the Colombian salsa scene, acting as arranger, bass player, studio musician, and bandleader for his Tesos as well as backing the highly successful Colombian salsa band, The Latin Brothers, plus launching salsa acts Afrosound in 1973 and Wganda Kenya in 1976, Former lead singer Wilson Saoko remembered Estrada as a strict leader.

One of their most popular songs is "El Preso" recorded in 1975 and sung by Wilson "Saoko" Manyoma. In an interview, Estrada said it "became a world anthem of salsa music". The song was composed by the band's percussionist Álvaro Velásquez. The lyrics are the narration of a prisoner ("preso") serving 30 years. The actual inspiration for songwriter Velásquez was a friend's letter describing another friend's pain being jailed for 30 years on a drug charge.

In 1998, when Colombia secured a position in that year's FIFA World Cup, Fruko came up with the team song: "La Pachanga Del Futbol." This proved to be one of Fruko's more endearing and infectious hits.

In 2013, Estrada ran for the Colombian Senate on the ticket of the governing party of President Juan Manuel Santos. In an interview with Colombia's Semana, Fruko said his purpose was to "defend the arts", representing the rights of musicians who often outlive their commercial success. He was inspired by salsa musician Rubén Blades who attained elected office in Panama.

The nickname "Fruko" came from the advertising doll of a popular Colombian fruit company called FRUCO ("Frutera Colombiana"), for which friends saw a resemblance to Estrada. Estrada changed the "C" in the Fruco trademark to "K" to differentiate himself from the brand name. The name was ironic because the Fruco doll advertised tomato 'salsa', meaning tomato 'sauce', whereas "Fruko" Estrada introduced to Colombia the style of music also called 'salsa'.

== Prominent former members ==
=== Joe Arroyo ===
"Fruko" Estrada discovered teenager Arroyo, who started by singing in bordellos, in 1972 and in 1973 installed him as primary lead vocals for Fruko y sus Tesos. Arroyo left to embark on a solo career, forming his Joe Arroyo y la Verdad group in 1981. Arroyo's "La Rebelión" is one of the most successful songs in the history of salsa music.

=== Wilson "Saoko" Manyoma ===
Wilson "Saoko" Manyoma, from Cali, Colombia was discovered by Fruko Estrada. Manyoma sang lead on some of the group's most important tracks, beginning on the album Ayunando, and including "El Preso" before leaving to pursue a solo career. Manyoma died on February 20, 2025.

=== Edulfamid "Piper Pimienta" Diaz ===
"Piper Pimienta" Díaz rotated lead vocals in the early 1970s before moving on to perform with The Latin Brothers and recording solo.
