= Joe Arroyo =

Colombian salsa singer (1955–2011)

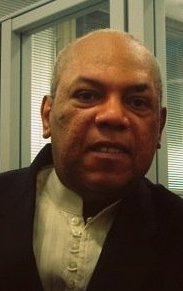
- Arroyo in 2008

Background information
- Also known as: El Joe
- Born: Alvaro Arroyo González; 1 November 1955; Cartagena de Indias, Bolívar, Colombia
- Died: 26 July 2011 (aged 55) Barranquilla, Atlántico, Colombia
- Genres: Joeson; salsa; tropical; cumbia; porro; chandé
- Occupations: Singer-songwriter; record producer; musician
- Instruments: Vocals; woodblock
- Years active: 1969–2011
- Labels: Discos Fuentes; Sony
- Formerly of: The Latin Brothers; Fruko y sus Tesos

Álvaro Arroyo González (also known as Joe Arroyo or El Joe; 1 November 1955 – 26 July 2011) was a Colombian salsa and tropical music singer, composer and songwriter. He is considered one of the greatest performers of Caribbean and salsa music in his country and across Latin America. In 2018, Billboard counted Arroyo's song "La Rebelión" as one of the "15 Best Salsa Songs Ever".

== Life and career ==
=== 1955–1970: Early life ===
Joe Arroyo was born and raised in the Nariño neighbourhood of Cartagena. His mother was Ángela González, a hotel manager. His father was Guillermo Arroyo, who fathered in total 39 children, with six wives, all named Ángela. At the age of eight Arroyo began singing in brothels in Tesca, a red-light district of Cartagena, which he did for several years.

=== 1970–1981: Early career ===
Arroyo's first credited release as vocalist was in 1970 with Manuel Villanueva Y Su Orquesta on their LP Hasta La Madrugada....!. He also sang with El Super Combo Los Diamantes in Sincelejo, and in 1970 performed vocals on their LP Capullito. Rubén Darío Salcedo, the leader of Los Diamantes, gave Arroyo the nickname El Joe. Arroyo also spent some time singing with La Protesta in Barranquilla.

In 1971 Arroyo was invited to join Fruko y sus Tesos by Julio Ernesto Estrada, the bassist and director of the band. By the end of the decade Arroyo had recorded 15 albums with Fruko y sus Tesos, alongside 4 more with The Latin Brothers, all for Colombian record label Discos Fuentes. Of Arroyo's tenure with Fruko y sus Tesos, El Tiempo wrote "Thus began the legend of the first great salsa orchestra in Colombia, with which Arroyo managed to impose a stamp that Colombia still dances to today". (Spanish: "Así comenzó la leyenda de la primera gran orquesta de la salsa en Colombia, con la cual Arroyo logró imponer un sello que todavía baila Colombia".) He performed with the band for ten years until 1981, when he began his solo career leading his band, named "La Verdad" (The truth).

=== 1981-2011: La Verdad ===
In 1981 Arroyo formed his own group, named Joe Arroyo y La Verdad, with whom he played around the world. The group recorded more than 20 albums between 1981 and 2007.

Arroyo became very successful by mixing salsa, cumbia, porro, soca, compas (or konpa), zouk and other music from the African Diaspora in a unique style. Some of his most famous songs are "Rebelión", "La Noche", "Tania", "El Ausente" and "En Barranquilla Me Quedo".

== Health issues and death ==
Arroyo suffered from health problems throughout his career, which forced him to cancel several performances. On at least one occasion he was falsely reported dead. In September 1983 Arroyo was nearly killed by a thyroid problem, and in 2000 a combination of diabetes and pneumonia brought him close to death while touring in Spain. He had to go through surgery because of problems with his eyes.

Arroyo's health issues have been attributed, in varying degrees, to drug use. He denied the involvement of drugs in his September 1983 illness.

Arroyo died in Barranquilla on 26 July 2011, after spending nearly a month in hospital due to multiorgan failure. The day before his death, he was given his final sacrament by the local bishop. Arroyo died at around 7:45 local time.

== Legacy ==
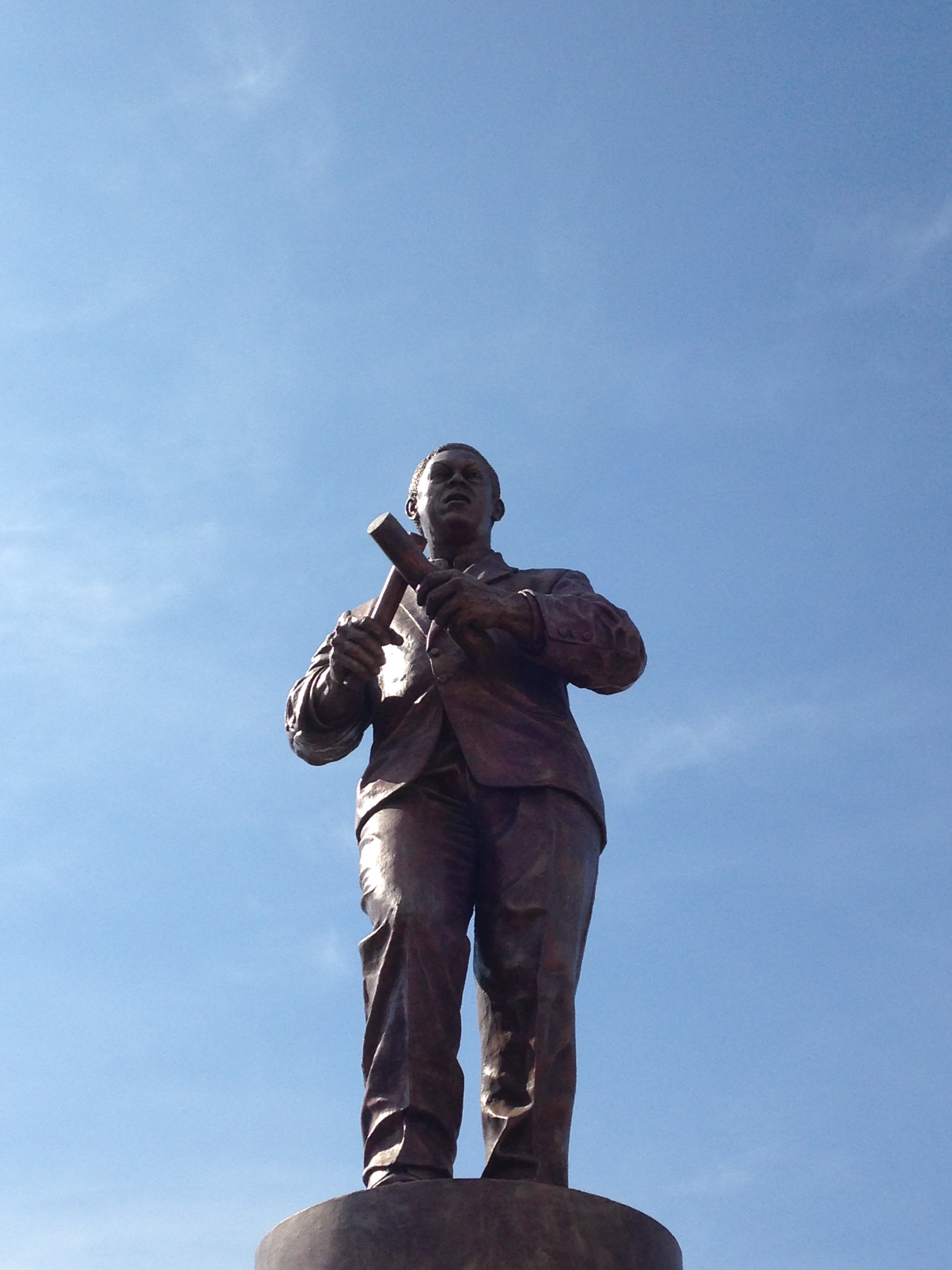
Statue of Joe Arroyo in Barranquilla.

Between June and December 2011 the RCN channel broadcast a soap opera based on the singer's life called El Joe, la leyenda (The Joe, the legend). On 9 November 2011, Shakira was honoured as Latin Recording Academy Person of the Year and performed a cover of Arroyo's song "En Barranquilla Me Quedo" at the Mandalay Bay Events Center as a tribute to the singer. A three-meter tall bronze and copper statue of Arroyo was unveiled in Cartagena, Colombia in 2013. Geotrigona joearroyoi, a species of bee discovered in 2014 in Colombia, was named in honour of Arroyo.

== Discography ==
- Arroyando (1981)
- Con Gusto y Gana (1981)
- El Campeón (1982)
- Actuando (1983)
- Hasta Amanecé (1984)
- Me le Fugué a la Candela (1985)
- Musa Original (1986)
- Echao Pa' Lante (1987)
- Fuego En Mi Mente (1988)
- En Acción (1989)
- La Guerra de los Callados (1990)
- Toque de Clase (1991)
- Fuego (1993)
- Sus Razones Tendrá (1994)
- Mi Libertad (1995)
- Reinando en Vida (1996)
- Deja Que Te Cante (1997)
- Cruzando el Milenio (1998)
- En Sol Mayor (1999)
- Marcando Terreno (2001)
- Se Armo la Moña en Carnaval (2005)
- El Súper Joe (2007)

== Awards and nominations ==
=== Latin Grammy Awards ===
A Latin Grammy Award is an accolade by the Latin Academy of Recording Arts & Sciences to recognise outstanding achievement in the music industry. Joe Arroyo received two nominations, and in 2011 he was presented with a posthumous career award.

Year	Nominee / work	Award	Result
2000	En Sol Mayor	Best Traditional Tropical Album	Nominated
2008	El Súper Joe	Best Contemporary Tropical Album	Nominated
2011	Special Awards (Posthumous)	Lifetime Achievement Award	Won

=== Congo de Oro ===
Arroyo has won the prestigious Congo de Oro prize of the Barranquilla Carnival 10 times. In 1990 the festival created the Super Congo de Oro award specifically to celebrate Arroyo.

== See also ==
- Fruko y sus Tesos
- Grupo Niche
- The Latin Brothers
