= The Latin Brothers =

Colombian salsa group originally led by Julio Ernesto Estrada Rincón

The Latin Brothers is a Colombian salsa group originally led by Julio Ernesto Estrada Rincón, known as 'Fruko'. It was created by Antonio Fuentes of the label Discos Fuentes as a response to the rival salsa groups of the day. Original lead singer Piper Pimienta along with Joe Arroyo and Julio Ernesto Estrada Rincón 'Fruko' carried the launch of the group's success in 1974. It was billed as a sister act to Fruko y sus Tesos on the Discos Fuentes label.

Among their most famous songs is "Las Caleñas son como las flores," which has become an anthem of sorts for the city of Cali, Colombia. The song was featured on the soundtrack of the video game Scarface: The World Is Yours and has been cited by British-born, Colombia-based funk artist Quantic as an inspiration. It is also featured on episode 8 of the Narcos Netflix tv series.

The Latin Brothers is a band created, managed, and led by Discos Fuentes personnel, establishing itself as one of the most important pillars of Colombian salsa and a cultural reference that has transcended borders, bringing the flavor and joy of Colombia to the entire world.

== Hits ==
- A la loma de la cruz - (1974) Singer: Piper Pimienta
- Dale al Bombo - (1975) Singer: John Jairo
- Buscándote - (1975) Singer: Piper Pimienta
- Patrona de los Reclusos - (1975) Singer: Joe Arroyo
- Las Caleñas son como las flores - (1975) Canta: Piper Pimienta
- Duelo de picoteros - (1975) Singer: Piper Pimienta
- Bailame como quieras - (1977) Singer: Joe Arroyo
- La guarapera - (1977) Singer: Joe Arroyo
- Sobre las olas - (1986) Singer: Joseito Martínez
- Fuma el barco - (1986) Singer: Joseito Martínez
- Dime que paso - (1986) Singer: Morist Jimenez
- A pesar - (1987) Singer: Morist Jimenez
- Las calaveras -(1988) Singer: Brigido "Macondo" Chaverra
- Salsa de la soledad- (1990)

== Discography ==
- El picotero (1974)
- Dale al bombo (1975)
- Te Encontre (1976)
- Bailame como Quieras (1977)
- Suavecito, Apretaito (1978)
- En su Salsa (1979)
- The Latin Brothers 80 (1980)
- El culebro (1981)
- Para bailar con The Latin Brothers (1986)
- The Latin Brothers en el Caribe (1987)
- Salsa y son caribe (1988)
- La negra quiere (1989)
- Sucesos (1990)
- Nuestra salsa (1991)
- The Latin Brothers (1994)
- Renaciendo (1997)
- Lo más sabroso (1999)
