= Los Hispanos =

Los Hispanos may refer to:

- Los Hispanos (Colombian band), a Colombian band founded in 1964
- Los Hispanos (quartet), a Puerto-Rican vocal quartet active in 1960s New York City
- The Spain men's national handball team, nicknamed Hispanos
