= Rodolfo y su Tipica RA7 =

Colombian orchestra

Rodolfo y Su Tipica R.A.7 was a Colombian Cumbia act, fronted by Rodolfo Aicardi (1946 - 2007), who had music released by the Discos Fuentes record label.

== Prominent hits ==
- "Tabaco y Ron" (1979)
- "La Colegiala" (1980), a cover of the omonym song by Peruvian combo Los Ilusionistas.

== Use in television advertising ==
In 1981, Nescafé used Rodolfo's "La Colegiala" in a French commercial for its Alta Rica brand. The commercial was credited with increasing sales by 60% and paving the way for Aicardi's successful European tour.
