= Golpe de suerte =

- Genre: Telenovela
- Based on: Si yo fuera rico by Rodrigo Cuevas
- Developed by: Kary Fajer
- Written by: Rubén Núñez; Ruth Tovar Tostado
- Directed by: Alejandro Gamboa; Isaías Gómez May
- Starring: Mayrín Villanueva; Eduardo Yáñez; Sergio Sendel; Eva Cedeño; Gonzalo García Vivanco; Marjorie de Sousa
- Theme music composer: Ángel Jaír Quezada Jasso; Jorge Eduardo Murguía; Mauricio L. Arriaga
- Opening theme: "Golpe de suerte" by Margarita La Diosa de la Cumbia and Santa Fe Klan
- Composer: Enrique Eduardo Pérez G.
- Country of origin: Mexico
- Original language: Spanish
- No. of seasons: 1
- No. of episodes: 92

Production
- Executive producer: Nicandro Díaz González
- Producer: J. Antonio Arvizu Velázquez
- Editor: Mauricio Coronel Cortez
- Production company: TelevisaUnivision

Original release
- Network: Las Estrellas
- Release: 16 October 2023 – 18 February 2024

Golpe de suerte (English: Stroke of Luck) is a Mexican telenovela produced by Nicandro Díaz González for TelevisaUnivision. The series aired on Las Estrellas from 16 October 2023 to 18 February 2024. It is an adaptation of the Chilean telenovela Si yo fuera rico, created by Rodrigo Cuevas. With an ensemble cast starring Mayrín Villanueva, Eduardo Yáñez, Sergio Sendel, Eva Cedeño, Gonzalo García Vivanco, Marjorie de Sousa, Daniela Martínez and Carlos Said, the series revolves around three families who win a grand prize jackpot and how their newfound fortune transforms their lives. This was the last telenovela produced by Nicandro Díaz González, who died a month after the conclusion of the telenovela.

== Plot ==
The telenovela follows three families from different social classes whose lives change the day they win the Melate lottery jackpot.

The first family are the Perez family: Nacho, his wife Lupita, and their children Wendy and Roni. Nacho has the Teporingos Neza football team in his heart, since his father was a player. Nacho's dream is to take the team to the first division and turn it into one of the best teams in the world.

The second family consists of Miranda, a single mother, and her son Diego, who, worried about their economic situation, asks his mother to buy a lottery ticket to buy a house and stop living on the streets.

The third family is formed by Brenda Uriarte and her brother Tony, who want to stop living under the control of their stepmother Constanza, but cannot collect their prize because they are minors.

The three families must deal with Dante Ferrer, an ambitious and corrupt financial advisor who becomes obsessed with stealing their money.

== Cast ==
=== Main ===
- Mayrín Villanueva as Lupita Flores de Pérez
- Eduardo Yáñez as Ignacio "Nacho" Pérez
- Sergio Sendel as Dante Ferrer
- Eva Cedeño as Miranda Ortíz
- Gonzalo García Vivanco as Tadeo Martínez
- Marjorie de Sousa as Eva Montana
- Horacio Pancheri as Facundo Grandinetti
- Michelle González as Roxana López
- Ricardo Silva as César Traven
- Alejandra Procuna as Irma
- Pietro Vannucci as Adrián
- Marcos Montero as Juan Ruiz Huerta
- Alex de Marino as Barrientos
- Maya Mishalska as Constanza Ramos
- Daniela Martínez as Brenda Uriarte
- Carlos Said as Alan Montes
- Elaine Haro as Sabrina Perea Ramos
- Marcelo Barceló as Ronaldo "Roni" Pérez Flores
- Tania Nicole as Wendy Pérez Flores
- Diego Escalona as José Antonio "Tony" Uriarte
- Fernanda Rivas as Cuky
- Camille Mina as Lucinda "Lucy" Chávez
- Constantino García as Diego Valardi Ortíz
- José Elías Moreno as Crispín Palominos
- Ana Bertha Espín as Dora Viuda de Flores

=== Recurring and guest stars ===
- Faisy as himself
- Ana Martín as Domitila
- Salvador Zerboni as León Yurma

== Production ==
On 24 March 2023, Horacio Pancheri announced that he had been cast in Nicandro Díaz González's upcoming telenovela. In April 2023, it was announced that the telenovela would be based on the 2018 Chilean telenovela Si yo fuera rico. On 1 June 2023, a press conference was held where the main cast was announced, as well as the official title of the series. Filming of the series began on 10 July 2023.

== Ratings ==
Viewership and ratings per season of Golpe de suerte
Season	Timeslot (CT)	Episodes	First aired		Last aired		Avg. viewers (millions)
Season	Timeslot (CT)	Episodes	Date	Viewers (millions)	Date	Viewers (millions)	Avg. viewers (millions)
1	Mon–Fri 8:30 p.m.	72	16 October 2023	3.1	18 February 2024	TBD	2.72

== Episodes ==
No.	Title	Original release date	Mexico viewers (millions)
1	"La esperanza muere al último"	16 October 2023 (Note: Premiered early online through Las Estrellas website on 13 October 2023.)	3.1
Sabrina makes life impossible for her stepsiblings, the most affected is Tony, who when trying to reach his stepmother's car accidentally destroys his school project. Tadeo takes advantage of Miranda's carelessness to steal her car keys, he tries to sell it to earn money, but finds a lottery ticket inside. Sabrina takes a compromising image of Brenda in order to slander her; however, Brenda threatens to denounce her. Nacho is sad because the Teporingos football team still can't win a game, but his mood changes he finds out the winning Melate lottery numbers.
2	"¡Me has hecho muy feliz!"	17 October 2023	3.0
Nacho wins the Melate jackpot and swears to Lupita that he will not change his ways now that they are millionaires. Roxana, upon learning that Tadeo is now a millionaire, proposes the idea of formalizing their relationship, since she is excited about starting a family. Miranda begins to get her hopes up about Tadeo, to the point of imagining a romantic story. Brenda and Tony fear that Constanza will take away the money they won in the Melate, but Dante looks for Brenda to help her collect her prize.
3	"Tú y yo le entramos al negocio"	18 October 2023	3.2
Crispín informs Nacho that the Teporingos' stadium is being sold, Nacho tries to negotiate so that this does not happen. Alan sees that Brenda is the victim of harassment by a classmate and defends her. Tadeo arrives at the Melate offices to collect the prize, knowing that the winning ticket belongs to Miranda and Diego. Nacho asks Dante for a favor.
4	"¿Quieres que me quede con todo el dinero?"	19 October 2023	2.9
Lupita does not accept that Nacho wants to buy the Teporingos, so she gives him a choice between their marriage or the football team. Nacho is mocked by his friends for changing his decision. Lucy convinces Tadeo to return to Miranda part of the money he stole from her, he accepts and leaves a large sum in her car. Brenda complains to her uncle Adrián about his abandonment when her father died and assures him that this mistake can be made up for if he agrees to do her a favor. Lupita reaches an economic agreement with Nacho and accepts that he buys the Teporingos team, Nacho proposes to spend the night in a luxury hotel.
5	"Darle la vuelta a la tortilla"	20 October 2023	2.6
Nacho officially purchases the Teporingos team and hires Dante as his financial advisor. Miranda does not accept the money from Tadeo. Nacho calls Facundo of Argentina to be part of the football team, but he is reluctant to accept for less than one million pesos.
6	"Ya me había ilusionado muchísimo"	23 October 2023	3.2
Lupita arrives on time for her date with Nacho, but he is busy communicating with Facundo and forgets about the date. After listening to the audio message sent by Miranda, Roxana thinks Tadeo is interested in another woman and slaps him. Brenda receives an image where she confirms that her uncle Adrián and Constanza are lovers.
7	"Nos vamos de la casa"	24 October 2023	2.9
Tadeo puts a stop to Ramón, Lucy's stepfather, and forbids him from hurting her again. Tadeo asks Lucy to stay at his house so that she feels safe. Nacho goes to Argentina with Lupita in order convince Facundo to be part of the Teporingos. Brenda does not forgive Constanza for being her uncle's mistress so she decides to leave the house. Roxana confesses to Irma, her godmother, that Tadeo won a large sum of money and ever since she learned the news she has become more interested in him.
8	"Yo no soy un pelagatos"	25 October 2023	3.0
Tadeo tells Roxana that they will not be able to live together since he does not plan to abandon Lucy. Alan manages to convince Brenda and Tony to move into his apartment, but Brenda assures him that it will be temporary. Lupita discovers that Nacho is being romantically linked to Lola Luján. Ashly makes it clear to Brenda that she is Alan's friend with benefits.
9	"Me trajiste con puros engaños"	26 October 2023	2.8
Tadeo asks Miranda to help him with Lucy's protection since she is in danger with her stepfather, Miranda hesitates to accept. Lucy pretends to be Tadeo and sends a text message to Roxana to inform her that he will be spending the night with Miranda. Alan makes Brenda believe that he is starting to feel something special for her, he tries to kiss her, but Tony interrupts them. Lupita is disappointed in Nacho because he made her believe that they would celebrate their honeymoon in Argentina, but in reality he had other plans.
10	"Quiero recuperar a mi hijo"	27 October 2023	2.8
Miranda assures Tadeo that he is a good man for her, since he is always helping people, and they kiss. Lupita wants nothing to do with Nacho and kicks him out of their hotel room, he asks her to let him in, but she throws all his belongings to the hallway. Brenda objects to Constanza taking custody of her brother Tony; however, Constanza shows her the order issued by the judge to take care of Tony.
11	"Miranda se va enterar que le robaste el boleto premiado"	30 October 2023	2.9
Tadeo scolds Lucy for using his phone to send a text message to Roxana, Lucy asks him to thank her as he can now be happy with Miranda. Miranda apologizes to Tadeo for stealing a kiss from him, he confirms that he can't feel anything for her since he has a girlfriend. Alan asks Brenda to get married so she can get her brother Tony back.
12	"Lo único que me importa eres tú y mis hijos"	31 October 2023	2.6
Brenda and Alan try to run away from Constanza's house, but Sabrina sees them and lets her mother know. Brenda thanks Alan for accompanying her in all her problems, he assures her that he will not leave her alone and surprises her with a kiss. Nacho assures Lupita that he bought her the house to show her that he is the opposite of what she thinks, since the only thing that matters to him is his family.
13	"Es imposible no enamorarme de ti"	1 November 2023	2.3
Brenda confesses to Alan that she won 200 million pesos, he assures her that he is willing to collect it so that she can enjoy her prize. Tadeo informs Lucy that her mother is back, she begs him not to take her home because she loves spending time with Miranda and her family. Tadeo confesses to Miranda that it is impossible not to fall in love with her and asks her to run away with him. Alan tells Dante that he does not want any of the prize money and makes it clear that he will collect the money to give it to Brenda.
14	"Olvídese de su matrimonio"	2 November 2023	2.8
Lupita confesses to Crispín that she does not want to leave her house because her family has been happy there for years. Alan finds out that Dante took it upon himself to tell Brenda the truth, she tells Alan that he is a traitor. Brenda confesses to Cuky that Alan is a swindler. Crispín warns Nacho that if he hires Facundo Grandinetti, his marriage to Lupita will end.
15	"Perdóname por no haberte creído"	3 November 2023	2.8
Tadeo rejects Dante as his financial advisor, Dante does not hesitate to blackmail him by revealing that he stole the prize he collected from Miranda. Tadeo forgets his commitment to Miranda and confronts Roxana for revealing that he stole the jackpot prize. Brenda threatens Constanza with making public the relationship she had with her uncle Adrián after her father's death and confesses to Tony that he had reason to distrust Alan.
16	"¡Miranda, yo cobré el premio de tu hijo!"	6 November 2023	2.7
Dante meets with Tadeo to ask him for 100 million pesos in exchange for not revealing to Miranda that he stole her prize. Tadeo confesses to Roxana that he is willing to return the money to Miranda as long as he does not give a single peso to Dante, Roxana refuses to let that happen. Tadeo has a nightmare where he reveals to Miranda that he collected the prize from her son Diego and for that reason he does not deserve her love. Alan looks for Brenda to explain to her what really happened with his uncle Dante, but she does not want to listen to him and Tony asks him to stay away.
17	"Te la jugaste por mí Roxana"	7 November 2023	2.9
Alan confesses to Brenda that at first he wanted to steal her money, but after getting to know her and seeing how special she is, he decided not to do so. Roxana meets with Dante to assure him that she will make sure that Tadeo agrees to give him the 100 million pesos and in exchange, she wants half of the money he will receive. Sabrina overhears Brenda's conversation with Cuky and discovers that her stepsister won a prize, so she informs Constanza.
18	"Si supieran que Dante es un estafador"	8 November 2023	2.7
Constanza places a camera in Brenda's bedroom to find out what prize her stepchildren are referring to. Alan asks his friends for help to support him with some money; however, they refuse. Constanza and Sabrina discover thanks to the surveillance camera that Brenda has won a prize of 200 million pesos, which causes Constanza to faint. Tadeo meets with Dante to show him Roxana's audio about the plan they had against him and thus confirming that he is a swindler and a hustler.
19	"No te tengo miedo Dante Ferrer"	9 November 2023	3.0
Sabrina tells Constanza that Brenda has not been able to collect her prize because she is a minor, Constanza concludes that this was the reason why she sought out her uncle Adrián. Tadeo assures Miranda that they can never be together since he cannot leave Roxana, Miranda, feeling used, asks him to get out of her life. Nacho is forced to accept his mother-in-law, Dora, in the house while she recovers from the accident he caused her, but he is sure that she is lying.
20	"Lupita recibe una propuesta indecorosa"	10 November 2023	2.6
Sabrina tells Brenda that the reason why Alan left her was because she was fat, but Brenda doesn't let Sabrina humiliate her. Tadeo manages to buy his dream motorcycle and decides that the first trip he is going to take will be with Roxana. Tadeo tells Lucy that he will take a trip with Roxana, she is disappointed since he swore to her that he would always take care of her. Facundo makes a pass at Lupita, to the point of offering her his house if she decides to leave Nacho.
21	"Nacho está emocionado con el debut de Grandinetti"	13 November 2023	2.9
Ramón gets tired of Lucy's questioning and, full of anger, breaks the cell phone that Tadeo gave her so that she could call him if she felt in danger. Roxana sets a trap for Alicia, Lucy's mother, with the intention of sending Lucy to a group home so that she will be away from Tadeo. Brenda tells Cuky that in the last few days she has seen a great change in Constanza so she is willing to ask her to collect her prize. Nacho is excited about Facundo Grandinetti's debut; however, he finds out that his new player has not arrived to the game.
22	"¿Facundo te está dedicando el gol?"	14 November 2023	2.8
Sabrina and Constanza agree that with Brenda's money, they will have several cosmetic procedures. Nacho asks Lupita to help him to get Facundo out of jail, she refuses and assures him that he should never have hired him. Tadeo visits Lucy at the group home and asks her forgiveness, she criticizes him for his lack of commitment, but does not hesitate to hug him. Facundo makes it to the Teporingos game and after scoring his first goal, he dedicates it to Lupita.
23	"Soy una mujer casada"	15 November 2023	2.8
Lucy suffers with the attitude taken by her roommates at the group home, while Tadeo hopes that he can take care of her while Alicia is released from jail. Dante threatens Constanza with revealing to Brenda everything she plans to do with her money, but Constanza puts a price on his silence. Facundo confesses to Lupita that she was his main reason for agreeing to be part of the Teporingos and steals a kiss from her.
24	"¡Soy Eva Montana!"	16 November 2023	2.6
Lupita slaps Facundo and asks him to respect her, Dora witnesses everything and is ready to tell Nacho the truth, but her daughter forbids her to do so. Roxana arrives at Tadeo's house and discovers that he kidnaped Lucy, he confesses that he plans to take her away while Alicia gets out of jail. Lucy abandons Tadeo because she doesn't want him to go back to jail, he freaks out and immediately goes out to look for her in the neighborhood. During one of the Teporingos' training sessions, Nacho is surprised by the visit of Eva Montana.
25	"Ignacio Pérez, el midas de Neza"	17 November 2023	2.4
Facundo confesses his feelings to Lupita, but she asks him to leave the Teporingos team. Eva quickly gains Nacho's trust and after the interview she says goodbye with a kiss on the cheek. Facundo tells Nacho that he wants to leave the team because of Lupita's behavior. Nacho objects and will do anything to keep him on the team. After being left on the street, Lucy seeks shelter from the storm, but finds herself in danger.
26	"¡Mamá, somos millonarias!"	20 November 2023	2.6
Nacho tears up the contract that Lupita made him and Facundo sign and assures her that from that moment on his working relationship with her ends. Sabrina and Constanza place a fake lottery ticket on Brenda's necklace and they celebrate that they will become millionaires. Lucy arrives at Miranda's house to ask for help, she immediately contacts Tadeo who reveals that he took the child out of the group home. Sabrina, seeing that Constanza does not intend to share the money with her, snatches the lottery ticket from her and threatens to burn it so that neither of them can collect Brenda's prize.
27	"¡Tadeo, no te vayas!"	21 November 2023	2.6
César asks Miranda not to endanger Lucy's life just to get away from Tadeo forever. Nacho kicks Dora out of his house after confirming that no one tried to rob her, since it was all an act of his mother-in-law. Sabrina and Constanza are ready to collect the Melate prize, but when they turn in the ticket, they find out that it is not the winning ticket. Eva arrives at Nacho's office for a photo shoot, but he immediately gets nervous having her close.
28	"Los declaro marido y mujer"	22 November 2023	2.8
Lupita finds the objects that the thieves supposedly stole from her mother and confronts her, who confesses that she lied because she is desperate. Miranda goes before a judge to prove that she can have temporary custody of Lucy, while Alicia is released from jail. Sabrina forces Constanza to go to the Civil Registry to marry Dante and thus continue with their plan to take Brenda's money. Eva tries to explain to Lupita about the change she plans to make to Nacho, but she understands that her husband's new image may make her insecure.
29	"Eres cómplice de tu madre"	23 November 2023	2.6
Diego lets Lucy and Tadeo know that he and his mother will soon be returning to Ensenada, Miranda explains that she will working with her father. Nacho informs Eva that he won't be able to do the photo shoot because of an unforeseen family event. Brenda tells Constanza that she won 200 million pesos and asks her to be the one to collect the grand prize. Nacho is sure that Lupita and Dora are accomplices in the supposed robbery of the house.
30	"¡Nacho se va de la casa!"	24 November 2023	2.5
Nacho questions Lupita about the little attention she pays to her son; she defends herself and assures him that he has never offended her like that before. Dante takes Constanza home and they kiss; he admits that everything is going easier than he thought. Nacho gets fed up with Dora and exposes her in front of his grandchildren, but Lupita gets tired of his dictatorship and puts him in his place.
31	"Amo a Miranda"	27 November 2023	2.5
Constanza cashes Brenda's lottery ticket and becomes the owner of the money. Alan reveals to Brenda that Dante has been tricking her to collect all her money. Eva helps Nacho to give a better image for the Teporingos and says goodbye to him with a kiss. Tadeo confesses to Roxana that he does not love her because he is in love with Miranda.
32	"¿Qué enciende tus pasiones, Nacho?"	28 November 2023	2.6
Eva questions Nacho about how he falls in love with a woman and what ignites his passion. Dante prevents Tony from leaving the house and Brenda decides to leave him with Constanza while she finds a way to do justice. Eva wants to win Nacho's heart through food and tries to seduce him, but Crispín ruins the moment. Brenda records a video to upload to social media and expose Dante.
33	"La nueva jefa de prensa de los Teporingos"	29 November 2023	2.5
Eva shows Nacho the photos that the paparazzo took of him and he decides to offer her the position of press officer for the Teporingos. Dante offers Brenda a monthly payment in exchange for forgetting the lawsuit. Eva deceives Nacho by trying to fix the mess of the photos against the Teporingos without realizing that she was the one who hired the paparazzo.
34	"Él es Marco, el papá de Diego"	30 November 2023	2.4
Tadeo visits Miranda and is surprised to meet Marco, who has returned to see his son Diego. Lupita finds Eva in Nacho's office and Eva tells her that she is the new press officer for the Teporingos. Lupita informs Nacho that she is going to college, but he assures her that she is too old for that.
35	"Terminemos de una vez por todas, Nacho"	1 December 2023	2.7
Lupita tells her mother how much it hurts her that Nacho has hired Eva on the football team. Miranda agrees to let Diego meet his father and he is finally reunited with him. Lupita gets tired of Nacho not letting her study and suffers from believing that he doesn't love her like he used to. Nacho confesses to Lupita that he is afraid she will meet another man at college and fall in love.
36	"Debo destruir el matrimonio de Nacho y Lupita"	4 December 2023	2.6
Nacho takes advantage of his reconciliation trip with Lupita to give her the engagement ring she was longing for. Tony declares in front of the judge that it was his stepmother who bought the Melate ticket and not Brenda, she, upon hearing the statement, lashes out at Constanza since she believes she manipulated her brother. Nacho informs Lupita that he had to leave town for a business meeting and promises her that he will be there for dinner; however, Eva prevents him from returning to his house.
37	"Nacho, dame un beso"	5 December 2023	2.4
Marco prevents Miranda from meeting with Tadeo and asks her for another chance since he confirmed that she is the woman he wants in his life. Eva steals a couple of kisses from Nacho and intends to spend the night with him, but he manages to stop her. Brenda confesses to Alan that she was scared when she saw some men trying to hurt him, he apologizes and assures her that he will soon solve her problems.
38	"Tadeo, siempre quiero estar contigo"	6 December 2023	2.7
Tadeo decides that the best thing for Lucy is for her to live in the group home, Miranda tries to stop this from happening. Miranda surprises Tadeo in his apartment and confesses that he is the man of her life, both kiss and make love. Lupita reveals to Nacho that they will soon become grandparents, he immediately confronts his son Roni for his irresponsibility.
39	"Eva, terminó su trabajo en los Teporingos"	7 December 2023	2.6
Nacho fires Eva from the Teporingos, she does not hesitate to defend herself and assures him that after the death of her father, she is taking medication that has fatal consequences if combined with alcohol. Constanza begs Brenda not to attempt against her life, since it would be a hard blow for Tony and swears that she will keep the promise she once made to her father. After what happened with Roni, Nacho confesses to Lupita that he failed as a father because he did not know how to raise his son and remembers the difficult moments his mother went through when she became pregnant.
40	"¿Por qué no me contaste que te casaste con Dante?"	8 December 2023	2.5
Miranda, upon seeing Tadeo's high expenses, questions him about how he manages to pay for them if he is currently unemployed. Alan confirms to Brenda that Constanza and Dante got married days before collecting the lottery money, they consult their lawyer to see if the marriage is legal. Roxana confirms that Tadeo has already forgotten her with Miranda, he tries to give her money to get her out of his life, but she puts a stop to him. Constanza decides to divorce Dante to avoid having more problems with Brenda, he opposes and manages to convince her by making her an offer.
41	"No te enamores de Tadeo"	11 December 2023	2.6
Brenda makes Constanza believe that Dante wants to take her on a trip to get rid of her so he can keep the money, so they make a plan to prevent it from happening. Miranda looks for Roxana to talk about what happened in her house, Roxana warns her not to fall in love with Tadeo because she will have a very bad time. In exchange for two million pesos, Roxana gives Dante the password to access Tadeo's information, he with the help of a hacker erases all his data. Lupita asks Eva if something happened with Nacho during their business trip, Eva assures her that something more than a simple meeting happened.
42	"¿Le contamos a Nacho lo que pasó entre tú y Grandinetti?"	12 December 2023	2.4
Eva complains to Lupita that she lost her job because of her unhealthy jealousy and takes the opportunity to bother her about the kiss with Facundo. Roxana reveals to Tadeo that she betrayed him with Dante, but when she confirmed that she is expecting his child, she broke their pact. Constanza tells Brenda that she hired a woman to seduce Dante, Brenda asks Alan to help her convince his uncle to go to dinner at the restaurant so he can meet his new lover.
43	"Roxana está esperando un hijo mío"	13 December 2023	2.7
Dante discovers that Constanza hired Lorenza so that he would be unfaithful to her, so he offers her double the money to abandon the plan. Tadeo accompanies Roxana to her ultrasound and they are thrilled to hear their baby's heartbeat for the first time. Miranda is very excited about her trip with Tadeo; however, he surprises her with the news that Roxana is pregnant.
44	"Tadeo, no necesito nada de ti"	14 December 2023	2.1
Tadeo gives Roxana a large sum of money and assures her that he will take care of all her son's expenses, but asks her not to get her hopes up about starting a family, since he will not be able to reciprocate. Dante arrives at Nacho's office where he meets Eva, he does not hesitate to congratulate her for her journalistic work and for how beautiful she is. Dante asks Negrete to investigate Eva, she does the same and also solists all the data of Nacho's financial advisor. Lupita tries to convince Nacho to ignore Dante's proposal, but he only mocks her and assures her that she thinks she is smarter because she goes to school.
45	"¡No me ponga esa cara de víctima!"	15 December 2023	2.2
Constanza is very excited with her engagement ring, but she discovers that it is a fake ring and complains to Dante, who assures her that he gave it to her with that intention so that she will not be a victim of crime. Sabrina arrives home with Alan and realizes that Brenda is watching them and to make her jealous, she kisses him in front of her. Constanza assures Sabrina that Alan is no good for her as he is just as ambitious as Dante. Lupita confesses to Nacho that Grandinetti will be her model for a university project, he gets upset and forbids her to use his image, since it is exclusive to his football team.
46	"¿Estás seduciendo a Nacho por sus millones?"	18 December 2023	2.6
Grandinetti gets upset with Nacho when he sees that he is being unfair to Lupita for not letting her grow professionally, Nacho warns him that he hired him just to score goals. Eva discovers that Dante is a swindler and assures him that she will reveal the truth to Nacho, but he brings up her dark past. The doctors do not give César much hope of life, but Miranda begs him to be saved since he is the only thing she has in life. Sabrina, being alone with Alan, makes a pass at him, but he rejects her.
47	"¡Me engañaste Brenda!"	19 December 2023	N/A
Alan goes to Brenda's house to see her, but she uses Hugo to make him jealous. Constanza discovers that Brenda and Alan want to prove that her marriage to Dante is a sham so that she can recover her fortune. Marco assures Miranda that he will not allow Diego to live with an aggressive man like Tadeo. Nacho accepts that Lupita uses Grandinetti's image for her project with the sole intention that they stop getting angry at each other.
48	"¡Compadre, Grandinetti le quiere comer el mandado!"	20 December 2023	N/A
Eva leads Nacho to believe that Lupita is fascinated by Grandinetti's fame and for that reason she used his image for her project. Constanza reveals to Sabrina that Alan still loves Brenda, Sabrina immediately confronts her for not letting her be happy. Alan tries to explain to Constanza that Dante is only trying to put her out on the street, she gives them a day to get evidence in order to believe them. Nacho arrives home and finds Lupita very attentive with Grandinetti, he gets upset and decides to go drinking with Crispín who assures him that the soccer player wants to steal his wife.
49	"Estoy dispuesta a declarar en contra de Dante"	21 December 2023	N/A
Alan records Dante as he confesses that he married Constanza to take her fortune and is willing to put up with her to get what he wants. Constanza, feeling fragile because of what happened with Dante, takes refuge in Brenda and asks for forgiveness because she has not been a good stepmother. Sabrina complains to Alan for betraying her and slaps him in the face. Dante asks Eva to forget the misunderstandings and toasts to the beginning of a friendship, both vow to take Nacho as far as possible.
50	"No pienso dejar a Lucy con su mamá"	22 December 2023	N/A
Dante surprises Constanza at her house and when he sees her trying to evade him, she reveals her plan with Brenda and Alan to denounce him. Dante convince Constanza to accompany him to the bank to transfer 100 million pesos. Constanza suffers a nervous breakdown because of the complaint she will file against Dante, but Brenda tries to calm her down by assuring her that she will not leave her alone financially.
51	"Brenda, aquí ya no tienes espacio"	25 December 2023	N/A
Lucy begs Tadeo not to let her go back to her mother, but when she sees that it is inevitable, she bursts into tears. Lucy escapes from her home when she learns that she will be moving to another state, Ramón manages to catch up with her and Alicia hurts her. Dante threatens Brenda with taking her brother away from her if she continues with the idea of taking his fortune, Alan assures her that they will reveal the truth to Nacho. Nacho gives Crispín a pickup truck to make up for the snub he gave him during the press conference, he refuses to accept it and resigns.
52	"¡Eres una traidora, Lupita!"	26 December 2023	N/A
Lucy contacts Tadeo to inform him that her mother and Ramón are planning to take her away, so she asks for his help. After confirming that Nacho has reconciled with Lupita, Eva makes him believe that his wife is cheating on him with Grandinetti. Nacho confronts Lupita about her infidelity, she tries to explain that Grandinetti kissed her by force, but he won't listen to reason. Brenda fears that Dante's threats will come true and asks Alan to stop his plan. Constanza prevents Tony from having contact with Brenda.
53	"Te juro que te volvería a besar, Lupita"	27 December 2023	N/A
Nacho complains to Grandinetti for messing with Lupita, he accepts that he stole a kiss from her, but Nacho kicks him off the team. Grandinetti apologizes to Lupita and informs her that Nacho has kicked him off the team. Nacho is determined to fire Grandinetti; however, Dante assures him that if he leaves the team his fortune will plummet. Unable to stay in a hotel, Brenda and Alan spend the night in a park, he promises her that when everything is over he will take her to the house he used to visit with his family to look at the stars.
54	"Nacho se va a dar cuenta de la cucaracha que eres"	28 December 2023	N/A
Brenda spends her first night with Alan, but assures him that she still doesn't feel ready to be with him. Lupita warns Eva that sooner or later Nacho will realize what kind of woman she is and assures her that it won't be so easy to destroy a marriage of 20 years. Dante informs Marco that Tadeo is not an investigator and may be a danger since he has been in jail for several years. Nacho discovers that his problem with Grandinetti has already been made public, so now the media will be looking for him for a statement.
55	"Grandinetti está enamorado de ti, Lupita"	29 December 2023	N/A
Dante confirms that it was Eva who spread the fight between Nacho and Grandinetti, so he demands her not to interfere in his business. Eva forces Nacho and Grandinetti to give a press conference to clarify the fight they had and in front of the cameras, they make peace. Alan returns to his uncle's apartment to pick up the last of his belongings and as he says goodbye, he wishes him that he will soon be in jail.
56	"Las cosas no tiene que cambiar entre nosotros, Lupita"	1 January 2024	N/A
Grandinetti does not want to leave Lupita's side and asks her if they can still be friends, but she refuses. Eva takes advantage of the distance between Lupita and Nacho to invite him to dinner and try to seduce him. Despite his anger with Lupita, Nacho does not want to be cheating on her with Eva.
57	"¡Acepta que me deseas, Nacho!"	2 January 2024	N/A
Lupita's alleged infidelity with Grandinetti continues to cause Nacho to be teased in public. Nacho lets himself be carried away by Eva's sensuality and stops resisting her kisses, without thinking that Crispín will surprise them.
58	"Te amo con toda mi alma, Nacho"	3 January 2024	2.6
After the kiss with Eva, Nacho decides to return home with Lupita and his children. Eva is furious when she realizes that her plan didn't work and that Nacho is back with Lupita. Eva's plan to let Lupita know that Nacho was unfaithful is set in motion, and Roni is the first to find out.
59	"Haz tu maleta y vete, Nacho"	4 January 2024	2.5
After arguing with his son, Nacho decides to show Lupita the photos of the kiss he had with Eva. Lupita can't stand that Nacho was unfaithful with Eva and asks him to leave the house. Eva is not willing to put an end to her plans and seduces Dante to get her way.
60	"Roni, ya sé que en este momento me debes estar odiando"	5 January 2024	2.3
Tadeo can't stand that Dante kept Miranda's money and decides to confess the truth. After spending a fun night with Brenda, Alan can't deny that he's falling in love with her. Nacho can't stand the disdain of his children and tries to make things right with them, but nothing goes as he expected. Crispín finds Eva again very close to Nacho and does not hesitate to point her out as the one responsible for everything bad that has happened to him.
61	"Quiero ser la señora de Ignacio Pérez"	8 January 2024	2.8
Miranda asks Lucy not to continue intervening on Tadeo's behalf because she does not intend to forgive him and is upset with her for being his accomplice. Lupita puts a stop to Eva and makes it clear that nobody messes with her, Nacho complains to his wife for the way she reacted. Brenda lives in terror after being taken by force by Bruno, who threatens to hurt Alan.
62	"¿Me puedes ayudar a que Larios no hable?"	9 January 2024	2.9
Alan does not know if he is ready to share his life with Brenda, so he is indifferent to her affection. César asks Miranda not to ratify the complaint against Tadeo since he had the courage to tell her the truth. Miranda begins remodeling the group home, but is surprised by a visit from Dante Ferrer.
63	"¿Nacho por qué le haces esto a nuestros hijos?"	10 January 2024	3.0
During their visit to the doctor, Tadeo and Roxana learn that the baby they are expecting is a boy. Nacho is sad because he did not receive any birthday messages from his children, Eva tries to take advantage of the moment to manipulate him. Wendy and Roni congratulate Nacho on his birthday, but Eva takes his cell phone to impersonate him and sends them a message.
64	"Salud por las esposas ingenuas"	11 January 2024	3.0
After learning that Alan kissed Antonella, Brenda decides to break up with him and is convinced that only she can get her brother Tony back. Constanta tries to surprise Dante at his apartment, but when she arrives she discovers that he is cheating on her with Eva. Antonella confesses to Alan that she loves him too much to let him ruin his life by marrying Brenda and steals a kiss.
65	"¡Ignacio, compórtate como un hombre decente!"	12 January 2024	2.8
Constanza is determined to expose Dante Ferrer on a national level, he tries to stop her by showing her the apartment he bought for her in Miami. Nacho finds out that images of him with the woman he met at the nightclub have begun to circulate, Lupita calls him out for his cynicism and asks him to behave like a decent man. Constanza confronts Dante and decides to kick him out of the house, he assures her that he has no relationship with Eva.
66	"¿Dante, te volviste loco?"	15 January 2024	3.0
Nacho tries to talk to Betzy to solve the scandal, but when he arrives, he sees the press and decides to pay a gasman to lend him his uniform so he won't be recognized. Dante sets a trap for Constanza and puts a couple of drops in the glass of water she is drinking. Lupita is very excited about her new project with Grandinetti, but Wendy is against it because she can't forget what happened between her mother and him.
67	"Lupita, esto del divorcio no te va a caer mal"	16 January 2024	3.1
Nacho is tired of being humiliated by his whole family, so he asks Lupita for a divorce, she accepts and asks him to be the one to break the news to their children. Nacho assures Grandinetti that if he keeps failing to score goals, he will sit him on the bench and take away the rewards assigned to him for every goal he does score. Brenda informs Constanza that she will take the trip to Miami with them, Dante and Constanza celebrate that she fell into their trap and will never see Tony again.
68	"¡Un día vas a pagar por todo Dante Ferrer!"	17 January 2024	3.0
Brenda starts receiving calls from Alan, but she ignores them, Tony questions her if something bad happened between the two of them. After taking her brother from school without Constanza's permission, Dante files a complaint against Brenda so that she can be imprisoned for the crime she committed.
69	"¿Qué pasa mami, te estás despidiendo para siempre?"	18 January 2024	2.9
Nacho allows himself to be manipulated by Dante and refuses to give Lupita the money they had agreed on for their children's education, as he believes the funds could fall into Grandinetti's hands. Dante is willing to remove from his path anyone who gets in the way of his plans, including Sabrina, whom he decides to commit to a rehabilitation clinic. Having the power over Tony, Dante decides to put him in a military school.
70	"Constanza, ahora vas a quedar como un triste vegetal"	19 January 2024	2.2
Brenda is tormented by a group of girls who try to prove to her that they are the ones in charge at the treatment center for minors. Dante convinces Constanza to swim for a while in the pool while he changes, but in reality, he is waiting for her to fall into his trap. Sabrina realizes that she is in a rehab clinic and believes it was Constanza's idea so that Dante wouldn't enroll her in acting school.
71	"Anoche me volví una gata salvaje"	22 January 2024	3.0
Brenda meets the lawyer who tries to help her get out of jail, but he asks her to pay a fee for her freedom, she suspects his bad intentions and escapes. Eva sees that Nacho has had too much to drink and takes him to her apartment with other intentions; however, things don't go as planned and she makes Nacho believe that they slept together. Miranda asks Tadeo not to try to get involved in Lucy's issue as it is not his problem and begs him to get out of her life because he only causes her harm.
72	"¡Dante Ferrer, es un estafador!"	23 January 2024	2.8
Miranda arrives at the school where Marco works and finds him seducing one of his students and reminds her of what he did to her several years ago. Alan is determined to help Brenda after learning that Raúl, the lawyer, is trying to hurt her. Tadeo makes it clear to Dante that nobody messes with him, so he steals his sports car.
73	"No voy a permitir que le hagas daño a Brenda"	24 January 2024	2.9
Grandinetti convinces Lupita to travel with him to Argentina to meet with the businessman who is interested in launching the clothing brand she is designing. Brenda takes the pills given to her by the headmistress to end all her problems, but seeing that she is in danger with Raúl, the other girls in the center save her. Dante gives Nacho documents where he proves that the man who seeks to defame him was in jail, so seeing Nacho's distrust, he decides to resign as his financial advisor.
74	"¿Viniste a Buenos Aires a aprovecharte de Facundo?"	25 January 2024	3.0
Fabiana apologizes to Brenda for the harm she did and assures her that there are few privileged women like her. Alan informs Brenda that she will never see him again and apologizes for the mistakes he made. Tadeo manages to track down León and asks him to help him gather evidence against his brother Dante Ferrer.
75	"¡Brenda, debes respetar las reglas!"	26 January 2024	2.6
Nacho confirms to Crispín that he is determined to run for mayor of Neza. León arrives to see his brother Dante, but in reality he only asks for money to escape and not to help Tadeo. Miranda receives the lawsuit filed by Alicia for final custody of Lucy, who asks Miranda not to allow her to be left with her mother and they talk to Tadeo.
76	"¡Tadeo, eres un metiche!"	29 January 2024	2.7
Brenda tries to escape from the group home; however, Jesús prevents this from happening. Brenda asks Miranda for a favor. The judge determines that Raúl, Brenda's aggressor, must pay a sentence of 120 years in prison for the crimes he committed against her. Nacho holds a press conference to announce that he will run for municipal president of Neza.
77	"Aquí no hay ranitas, solo dos escorpiones venenosos"	30 January 2024	2.7
Dante discovers that his brother León deceived him to obtain confidential information and decides put a stop to him. Tadeo arrives on time for his appointment with León, but is a victim of his evil, as he will not allow him to continue lying to him. Diego overhears his mom's conversation with Marco and confirms his dad's cheating by seeing him with another woman.
78	"Miranda, mi amor por ti es verdadero"	31 January 2024	2.8
Wendy finds the messages that Facundo sent to Lupita and complains to her for forgetting her father so quickly. Nacho lets Lupita know that Wendy will stay with him, after learning about her relationship with Grandinetti. León and his people threaten Roxana, she fears for her life and that of her baby and blames Tadeo for what happened.
79	"Mentir ante un juez, te podría costar la cárcel"	1 February 2024	2.8
After a custody trial for Lucy, Miranda receives the news that she becomes her legitimate and legal guardian. Maribel overhears Brenda's conversation with Alan and confirms that she is beginning to have feelings for Jesús. Rony surprises his mother when Grandinetti gives her a gift by assuring her that he is willing to support her in whatever decision she makes.
80	"Nacho Pérez, ya no te reconozco"	2 February 2024	2.6
Brenda arrives at Jesús' job and discovers that he is involved in a business that could bring him a lot of trouble. Nacho finds out that Grandinetti has returned to training and confronts him for falling in love with Lupita. Eva tries to win Wendy over and takes the opportunity to ask her forgiveness for falling in love with her father, since her only interest was to help him fulfill his dreams.
81	"¿Dante Ferrer te está molestando?"	5 February 2024	2.7
Dante blackmails Miranda with telling the judge that she lied in her statement about Lucy, but in exchange for his silence, he wants her entire fortune. Brenda returns to her house to retrieve some belongings that will be useful to Jesús to get him out of debt. Nacho thanks Eva for all the time she has been by his side, he kisses her, but thinks of Lupita.
82	"¡Nacho, voy a tener un hijo tuyo!"	6 February 2024	2.8
Wendy arrives at her Nacho's office and finds him kissing Eva, she questions him if he has a relationship with his publicist. Eva shows Nacho the results of her pregnancy test and confirms that she is expecting his child. Brenda discovers that Miranda is being blackmailed by Dante so she asks her not to make any deals with him.
83	"Te convertiste en la mujer del 'midas de Neza'"	7 February 2024	2.8
Nacho asks Eva to perform a DNA test on the baby to prove that the child she is expecting is indeed his. When Brenda learns that Dante will now be in charge of the group home, she does not hesitate to confront him and is sure that he will leave the institution. Eva confirms to Dante that she is expecting Nacho's child, but Dante suspects it might be his.
84	"Nacho, lo nuestro terminó para siempre"	8 February 2024	N/A
Lupita signs the divorce papers, but when Nacho is about to do it an earthquake interrupts them, he takes that moment to say goodbye to her. Dante confronts Eva for hiding from him that he is the real father of the child she is expecting. Tadeo is convinced that he wants to spend the rest of his life with Roxana, so he surprises her by giving her an engagement ring.
85	"Nacho renuncia a la candidatura"	9 February 2024	N/A
Sabrina tries to escape from the rehab clinic but is caught, she concludes that Dante betrayed her and Constanza. Brenda reveals to Miranda that she found her father's autopsy report and confirms that on the day of his accident, her father was drunk. Eva and Lupita confront each other at the hospital to see which of the two receives the reports on Nacho's health. During one of her check-ups, Constanza manages to wake up from her coma.
86	"Voy a desaparecer a Dante de tu vida"	12 February 2024	N/A
Tadeo subdues Dante and warns him that he has 24 hours to return all the money he stole from Miranda. Nacho warns Eva that he does not intend to marry her since he has no feelings for her, but assures her that he will take responsibility for her son. Eva assures Nacho that if he is absent, Lupita and her children will deny her what is owed to the baby, so she asks him to marry her as soon as possible.
87	"No tengo pruebas contra Dante Ferrer"	13 February 2024	N/A
Roxana confronts León's people, but she gets hurt and her life and that of her baby are in danger. The doctor informs Tadeo that his son will have to stay in the incubator for a while because he is premature, and Tadeo makes him a promise. Nacho seeks Dante to confess if it is true that he bribed the referees, he denies the accusations and assures him that Crispín is behind everything.
88	"Sé tantas cosas de ti, que puedo hundirte"	14 February 2024	N/A
Tadeo takes his son to Roxana so she can meet him, she asks Tadeo to tell him every day that she loves him, her body can no longer resist and she dies. Alan arrives at the home where Brenda is, but finds her kissing Jesús. Crispín seeks out Tadeo to meet with him and talk about the illegal things that Dante is doing, which compromise the credibility of the Teporingos team.
89	"Dante Ferrer también es un asesino"	15 February 2024	N/A
Lucy decides to read the letter she wrote to Roxana during her funeral. Brenda manages to get Sabrina to safety. Sabrina confesses that Dante locked her up in a rehab clinic and fears that her mother died because of him.
90	"Lo siento, tu mamá no puede hablar"	16 February 2024	N/A
Brenda asks Sabrina not to leave her room because Dante could see her and reveals that he also stole Miranda's money. Miranda finds Tony's whereabouts and with the help of the authorities, manages to rescue him so he can be reunited with his sister Brenda.
91	"Brenda eres muy valiente"	18 February 2024	N/A
92	"Nacho, puedes besar a tu esposa"	18 February 2024	N/A
Brenda uses her social media to denounce Dante Ferrer's thefts, Sabrina accuses him of wanting to kill her mother. Alan expresses his admiration for Brenda for denouncing Dante and reiterates his great affection for her. Eva does not want her child to be born in jail, so she decides to hurt herself. After Dante's attack, Nacho is rushed to the hospital where doctors resuscitate him after he suffers cardiac arrest. While trying to flee from the police, Dante falls off a cliff and dies. Tadeo informs Miranda that Dante's money has been confiscated and that there is a good chance that everyone will get their fortune back. Miranda and Tadeo get married in a civil ceremony with their loved ones as witnesses. Lupita and Nacho celebrate their silver wedding anniversary and reaffirm their love for each other.
