= La Sonora Dinamita =

Mexican musical group

- Also known as: La Sonora Dinamita
- Origin: Cartagena de Indias, Colombia (from 1960 to 1963); Mexico City, Mexico (since 1977)
- Genres: Cumbia; Salsa; Son Montuno; Merengue
- Years active: 1960–1963; 1977–present
- Labels: Discos Fuentes; Fonovisa; Universal
- Members: Charlie Alvarez; Tony Peregrino; Osman Ocoro; Johanna Betancourt; Lujan Zarate Edith Quetzaly
- Past members: Citlalli Moctezuma; Lucho Argaín; Margarita Vargas; India Meliyara; Rodolfo Aicardi; Raul Velasquez; Doris Montenegro; Maria Angeles Pupo; Manolo Garcia; Ariel Veliz; Álvaro Pava; Vilma Diaz; Macondo; Adriana; Lucy Peñaloza; Salvadorean Susana VelásquezPizarro; Armando Hernández; Louis Towers; Carlos Piña; Zoila Nieto; Luz Stella; Willie Calderón; Zayda Saladem; Leydi Ballesteros; Glenis Ramírez; Rubiana; Pilar Solano; Orlando Quesada; Mónica Guzmán; Mike Alvear; Angélica Rangel Macondo; Luz Esthela Montoya; Gaby Sánchez; Ernesto Elizondo; Carmen González; Bibiana Ramirez; Amina Osorio
- Website: originalsonoradinamita.com

La Sonora Dinamita is a Mexican musical group that plays cumbia, a tropical music genre that is popular throughout Latin America. As one of the first cumbia groups to reach international success, it is credited with helping to popularize the genre throughout Latin America and the world.

== Origins ==
The original orchestra was formed in 1960 in Cartagena de Indias, Colombia, under the direction of bandleader Lucho Argaín. Saldarriaga and Lalo Orozco began by gathering representative musicians from Colombia's Atlantic coast, striving to follow the recommendations made by Don Antonio Fuentes. The group made a few recordings on the Discos Fuentes record label. It disbanded in 1963.

== Recent decades ==
The group was re-formed in 1975 under the direction of Julio Ernesto Estrada "Fruko" Rincón, the artistic director of Discos Fuentes. La Sonora Dinamita in 1977 released its first album in its new formation, La Explosiva, and reactivated their audience with hits such as "Del monton", "Maicito a otro pollo", "Guitarra amiga", "Ave de paso", "Negro maluco" and "Ja ja venao".

In 1981, the group had its first hit recordings, including "Mi Cucu" (1988), in its new incarnation. Their 1986 album, Sida, reached number five on the Regional Mexican Albums charts.

In 1989, the group had its first European tour and in 1991, it had its first appearance at New York City's Madison Square Garden.

In 2002, the band's founder and frontman Lucho Argaín died, and the band continued with a new line-up. Today, their lead singer is Charlie Alvarez.

While the group's lineup has changed, it has always featured a strong female vocalist to accompany its ten-piece brass instrumentation, including Margarita Vargas (la Diosa de La Cumbia), Mélida Yará (La India Meliyará), Vilma Díaz (La Diva de La Cumbia), Susana Velasquez, and other female vocalists and also several male vocalists.

== Discography ==
- La Copa De La Vida 2019
- Juntos Por La Sonora 2016
- Los Mechones 2015
- Exitos Tropicosos 2015
- La Vibrante Sonora Dinamita 2015
- Que Nadie Sepa Mi Sufrir - Amor de Mis Amores 2014
- A Mover el Cucu 2014
- Cumbia Caliente con La Sonora Dinamita 2014
- La Gran Sonora Dinamita y sus Estrella 2014
- Esto si es Dinamita 2014
- Grandes Hits La Sonora Dinamita 2014
- Una Leyenda - La Sonora Dinamita 2014
- Historia Musical de La Sonora Dinamita 2014
- La Suprema Sonora Dinamita 2014
- La Tropicalisima Sonora Dinamita 2014
- 20 Grandes Exitos 2011
- Dinamitazos de Oro decada de los 80 Vol.2 2005
- Dinamitazos de Oro decada de los 80 Vol.1 2005
- Canta como - Sing Along: La Sonora Dinamita 2002
- 30 Pegaditas de Oro 1999
- A Mover la Colita 1999
- La Mera Mera 1999
- La Reina de La Cumbia 1997
- Super Exitos Vol.2 1996
- Super Exitos Vol 1 1994
- Chispeante 1993
- La Sonora Dinamita Gold 1991
- 16 Supercumbias 1990
- 30 Pegaditas de Oro Vol.1 1988
- 16 Grandes Exitos 1987
- La Cumbia Nació en Barú 1982
- Dinamita 1963
- Ritmo 1960
- Fiesta en el Caribe 1958

== Former vocalists and their recordings (hits) ==
Vocalist	Recorded Songs
Adriana	Pitaste (With Nando Malo).
Álvaro Pava	Mil horas, Despeinada, Pilar, Grito Vagabundo, Dame tu mujer José, La suavecita, El tuerto, La camisa negra, El vicio de tu boca, Mucho mejor, El Pollo, Mi mujer se puso buena, Que importa la edad, Cumbia Pigmeo, La negra sabrosa, Pintao el bigote (with Zoila Nieto), etc..
Álvaro León Pizarro	Amor en California, Cumbia Mario Bross.
Amina Osorio	El paraguas, Del ombligo para arriba, Busco un negro, El apagón, Ilusión perdida, La sobadita, No se levanta.
Aylem Rodríguez	Da que te vienen dando.
Bibiana Ramirez	Me duele el corazón, Mucha plata, La palmita, Dame un beso, La Soledad.
Bobby Ruiz	El marañon, pedazo de cariño.
Carlos Piña	Arbolito de Navidad, La víspera del Año Nuevo.
Carmen González	Noches de cumbia, Yo me llamo cumbia.
Doris Montenegro	La Lewinsky, Me Duele el Corazon.
Eddy Guerra	La que toma ron, El gusano peludo.
Ernesto Elizondo	Ni me hablen de ella, El dolor de Micaela, Que cheque su email, La mueve, A mover el cu..., Si no vuelve, La Disputa, Porque vives con ella, Con la cola entre las patas.
Gaby Sánchez	El baile del pum, Desnúdame, No vuelvas a llamarme.
Glenis Ramírez	Por que te quiero así, La sombra, Recuerdos, Cumbia iluminada.
John Jairo Murillo - El Sorullo	Llegó el timbal, Donde Andaras.
Juliett (Myriam del Socorro Valencia)	El africano, Electricidad, Evidencias.
La India Meliyará	Las velas encendidas, Changó, Los mechones, La cumbiambera del siglo, Mi cucu, El viejo del sombrerón, Empujaito, La conga, El nopal, La malumbia, El apreton, La firma, La corazonada, Chicharrón, Gallina y Pescao, El peluquín, Largate Manuel, Que es lo que tu quieres, Carrataplum, Velita mia, Atarrayando, La cumbia de batman, Lindo maridito, etc.
Leydi Ballesteros	La historia de mi vida, Sabor de idilio, Los calzones.
Louis Towers	La pochita, Josefina.
Lucho Argain	Mi cucu (with La India Meliyará), Se me perdió la cadenita, Cumbia Barulera, Las brujas, El baile de la vela, Ponte en cuatro, Maruja, La píldora de amor, De lo que te perdistr (with Vilma Díaz) No provoque mi pichichi (with Margarita), La parabólica, Golpes que da la vida, Ay chave, etc.
Lucy Peñaloza	Calinda (with Lucho Argain), La nueva reina

Vocalist	Recorded Songs
Luz Elena Restrepo	Otra ocupa mi lugar, El arrugadito (with Ernesto Elizondo).
Luz Esthela Montoya	El murciélago, La pelusita, Celosa, las cosquillitas, Calvo y cabezón.
Macondo (Brígido Chaverra)	El amor de Claudia, La bamba, El solitario, El viejo del sombreron (with La India Meliyará), Las mujeres a mi no me quieren, La piña madura (with La India Meliyará), La mochila, La araña picua (with La India Méliyara).
Marcela Díaz	Las solteras.
Margarita la Diosa de la Cumbia	Que nadie sepa mi sufrir, Oye, Macumba, Saca la maleta, De aquello na’, La cortina, A mover la colita, Capullo y sorullo, Cumbia del Sida, la tabacona, llámame, buscando el gato, la toalla mojada, el telon etc.
May González	Pilonera, La Cortina (junto a Margarita).
Mike Alvear	El maniquí, La Chiqui, Guatemalteca, La chava, El chicharrón peluo.
Mónica Guzmán	Cariño mío, Futuro, Uno, Cumbia aeróbica, Cumbia caliente, Cumbia Cristiana.
Nando Malo	Vuela vuela, La rama de pringamoza, Que criterio “La gota fría”, Talento en televisión, El muñeco, Kiskiriski, El anillito, La ventanita, La tierra, Agua viva, Cachete pechito & Ombliguito, Pitaste (with Adriana), La sejuela (with Amina Osorio).
Nathaly Guerra	Así no te amara jamás.
Natalia Herrera	Yo soy la cumbia.
Orlando Quesada	La medallita, El padre Armando, Amor a la mexicana, El chupacabras, Un día en New York, El traje de Eva, El tabacón (en Cuba no falta na').
Oscar Luis Argain	El tiguerón, Son dos.
Pilar Solano	Fiel o no fiel, Que lindo cu "la segunda del cucu" (with Lucho Argain).
Rodolfo Aicardi	El ciclón, La cumbia de mi pueblo, La niña nory, María Cristina, Carola, El tizón, Soledad en la playa, La ricachona, Maluca.
Rubiana	Aprovéchame.
Susana Velásquez vocalista [Salvadorian]	Si vos te vas, La Cumbia de El Salvador, Gracias Verónica, El Ratón Vaquero, Que te la pongo/la bolita (with Willie Calderon), El bardo, Otro día más sin verte, Yo no nací para amar, Misión imposible.
Vilma Díaz Colombian vocalist	Escandalo, El desamor, Ya para qué, Suspiros, Chiquita pero cumplidora, La tembladera, De lo que te perdiste (with Lucho Argain).
Willie Calderón	Maldito cucu, Mete y saca, Islas canarias, Que te la pongo/La bolita (with Susana Velásquez).
Zayda Saladem	Ni pío, Tus lágrimas, Tristes Recuerdos.
Zoila Nieto	El bigote, Fallé y te perdí, Pintao el bigote (with Alvaro Pava).
