= List of number-one albums of 1984 (Spain) =

The List of number-one albums of 1984 in Spain is derived from the Top 100 España record chart published weekly by PROMUSICAE (Productores de Música de España), a non-profit organization composed by Spain and multinational record companies. This association tracks record sales (physical and digital) in Spain.

== Albums ==
Week	Chart Date	Album	Artist
1	January 2	La Música	Mocedades
2	January 9	Monstruo	Varios Artistas
3	January 16	Monstruo	Varios Artistas
4	January 23	Monstruo	Varios Artistas
5	January 30	Thriller	Michael Jackson
6	February 6	Thriller	Michael Jackson
7	February 13	Thriller	Michael Jackson
8	February 20	Thriller	Michael Jackson
9	February 27	Thriller	Michael Jackson
10	March 5	Thriller	Michael Jackson
11	March 12	Thriller	Michael Jackson
12	March 19	Thriller	Michael Jackson
13	March 26	Thriller	Michael Jackson
14	April 2	Thriller	Michael Jackson
15	April 9	Thriller	Michael Jackson
16	April 16	Thriller	Michael Jackson
17	April 23	Thriller	Michael Jackson
18	April 30	Thriller	Michael Jackson
19	May 7	Thriller	Michael Jackson
20	May 14	Thriller	Michael Jackson
21	May 21	Thriller	Michael Jackson
22	May 28	Thriller	Michael Jackson
23	June 4	Thriller	Michael Jackson
24	June 11	Thriller	Michael Jackson
25	June 18	Thriller	Michael Jackson
26	June 25	Géminis	Ana Belén
27	July 2	Géminis	Ana Belén
28	July 9	Cuerpo a Cuerpo	Luis Eduardo Aute
29	July 16	Géminis	Ana Belén
30	July 23	Géminis	Ana Belén
31	July 30	Géminis	Ana Belén
32	August 6	Camouflage	Rod Stewart
33	August 13	Discovery	Mike Oldfield
34	August 20	Discovery	Mike Oldfield
35	August 27	Discovery	Mike Oldfield
36	September 3	Discovery	Mike Oldfield
37	September 10	Discovery	Mike Oldfield
38	September 17	1100 Bel Air Place	Julio Iglesias
39	September 24	1100 Bel Air Place	Julio Iglesias
40	October 1	1100 Bel Air Place	Julio Iglesias
41	October 8	Amaneciendo en tí	José Luis Perales
42	October 15	Amaneciendo en tí	José Luis Perales
43	October 22	Amaneciendo en tí	José Luis Perales
44	October 29	The Woman in Red	Stevie Wonder
45	November 5	Amaneciendo en tí	José Luis Perales
46	November 12	The Woman in Red	Stevie Wonder
47	November 19	The Woman in Red	Stevie Wonder
48	November 26	The Woman in Red	Stevie Wonder
49	December 3	The Woman in Red	Stevie Wonder
50	December 10	The Woman in Red	Stevie Wonder
51	December 17	The Woman in Red	Stevie Wonder
52	December 24	The Woman in Red	Stevie Wonder
53	December 31	The Woman in Red	Stevie Wonder

== See also ==
- List of number-one singles of 1984 (Spain)
