= Gustavo Quintero =

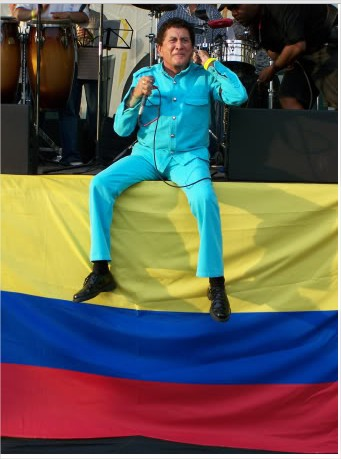
- Gustavo "El Loko" Quintero

Background information
- Also known as: Gustavo "El Loko" Quintero
- Born: Gustavo Quintero; 23 December 1939
- Origin: Medellín, Antioquia, Colombia
- Died: December 18, 2016 (aged 76)
- Genres: Cumbia; Tropical
- Occupations: Singer-songwriter; musician
- Instruments: Vocals; Accordion; Dulzaina
- Labels: Codiscos; Discos Fuentes; Sony Music; Discos Musart; Discos Victoria; Sonolux

Gustavo de Jesus Quintero Morales, better known as "El Loko", (23 December 1939 – 18 December 2016) was a Colombian singer-songwriter. He is considered one of the great representatives of the Colombian tropical music.

== Early life ==
Quintero studied at the Édgar Poe Restrepo school in Medellín and from an early age he has shown his musical skills. He participated in choirs of churches and received classes at the school of Fine Arts in Medellín. "El Loko", as he was known, studied Economics at the University of Antioquia, which he didn't finish. He was called "Loko" for his stage antics.

== Career ==
When he lived in Cali, he formed the band Los Gatos. He was also a singer with The Teen Agers. Upon his return to Medellín he formed the group Los Hispanos. Then he left Los Hispanos (Codiscos), with Rodolfo Aicardi replacing him, and formed Los Graduados.

"Asi Empezaron Papa Y Mama" was a famous dance song of Los Graduados. He was the first showman of Colombian tropical music.

Quintero is one of the most imitated artists in both style and music, many musical groups dedicating themselves to perform his music during the Christmas season.

== Death ==
Quintero had had several health problems and complications throughout his life. His death occurred on the Sunday of 18 December 2016 at 1:40 in the morning at the Las Americas Clinic in Medellín to stomach cancer.

== Songs ==
- La Cinta Verde
- Asi Empezaron Papa Y Mama
- Ese Muerto no Lo Cargo Yo (Don Goyo)
- Fantasia Nocturna (Lucerito)
- Carita De Angel
- La Pelea Del siglo
- La Banda Del Vecino
- La Maestranza
- Juanito Preguntón
- Quinceañera
- El Coquero
