= Rodolfo Aicardi =

Colombian singer

- Aicardi in an undated image

Background information
- Born: Marco Tulio Aicardi Rivera; May 23, 1946; Magangué, Bolívar, Colombia
- Died: October 24, 2007 (aged 61) Medellín, Colombia
- Genres: Cumbia, cumbión, merengue, paseo, balada romántica, balada-ranchera, paseaíto, bolero, porro, vallenato, zamba, cumbia andina, maestranza, puya, guaracha, tamborera
- Occupation: Singer
- Years active: 1965–2007
- Label: Discos Fuentes
- Formerly of: Sexteto Miramar, Rodolfo y su Tipica RA7, Los Hispanos, Los Ídolos, Los Bestiales, Grupo Monteadentro, La Sonora Dinamita

Marco Tulio Aicardi Rivera (23 May 1946 – 24 October 2007), better known by the name Rodolfo, was a Colombian singer of tropical music who was active from the 1960s until his death. He is most famous for his song "La Colegiala" credited to Rodolfo y su Tipica RA7.

== Career ==
Born in Magangué, Bolívar, he lived there until he was 15 years old, when he moved to Medellín. At a very young age he began his artistic career with great effort and passion for music.

He made his debut in tropical and romantic songs with the group "El Sexteto Miramar", with bolero-ballad songs "Que quiere esta música esta noche", "Una lágrima por tu amor", "Desde la ventana de mi apartamento" etc. His first recording as a singer was in 1966 with Club del Clan singing "Bellos Recuerdos" on the Sonolux label. In 1967 he adopted the name Rodolfo followed by a solo release for him in 1967 with Discos Fuentes. 1969 saw his major release as "Rodolfo y el sexteto Miramar" with songs like "El Triunfador" and "El de siempre" .

Clearly a star of tropical rhythms, Rodolfo joined the group "Los Hispanos" replacing their main singer Gustavo Quintero when the latter retired from the band before forming his own group "Los Graduados". "Los Hispanos" became his major band. Hits with them included "Adonay", "Boquita de caramelo", "Cariñito", "Ocho días", "Papelito blanco" etc. He stayed with them from 1969 to 1971 and would return from 1980 to 1992 as well. In between he was in "Los Ídolos" from 1971 to 1972 and "Los Bestiales" from 1972 to 1973. Other projects included "Grupo Monteadentro" in 1982 and "La Sonora Dinamita" in the mid 1980s.

Rodolfo's fame traversed all Spanish-speaking countries and further to Europe and Asia. He also varied his repertoire also singing in the Mexican ranchera and Argentinian zamba styles.

His most long-standing musical formation was La Típica RA7 and the formation was known as Rodolfo y su Tipica RA7 concentrating on the Peruvian cumbia style. Discos Fuentes was instrumental in his success aided further by its subsidiary Mexican Records. He toured extensively, promoted by Discos Fuentes visiting Mexico, the United States, all of Central America, South America and parts of Europe, also notably the Olympia of Paris.

Rodolfo also cooperated with Orquesta de Manuel Mantilla, with El Combo Palacio, Orquesta de Ray Cuestas, Combo Los Nativos, Pintura Roja. Famous songs include "Chica Bonita", "Besos de Fuego" and "Cumbia de la Vanidad". He was famous with "Tabaco y Ron" in 1979 credited to Rodolfo y su Tipica RA7. Another hugely popular song of Rodolfo in the 1980s was "Cariñito" originally by the Peruvian formation "Angel Rosado y Los Hijos del Sol". But his most famous hit was "La Colegiala", first locally in Latin America but later internationally when Nescafé used it in its commercial.

In the 2000s he continued to release popular songs like "Adolorido", "Las tres marías" and "A Dios le pido", the latter a cover of Juanes.

In the 2000s, Rodolfo suffered from serious health issues including diabetes and kidney failure, and had a transplant of kidneys. Rodolfo died in Medellín on October 24, 2007, from a cardiac arrest.

After Rodolfo Aicardi's death, his sons Marco Aicardi, Gianni Aicardi and Rodolfo Aicardi Jr. decided to continue singing with the group Los Hermanos Aicardi, a group created by Rodolfo himself.

== Discography ==
- Yo Vine Pa' Gozar (with El Sexteto Miramar) (1968)
- Salsa Mi Hermana (with El Sexteto Miramar) (1968)
- Con Ustedes (with El Sexteto Miramar) (1969)
- De Nuevo Los Hispanos (1969)
- De Pelea (1969)
- De Peligro (1969)
- El Triunfador (1969)
- De Triunfo En Triunfo (1970)
- El Incontenible Rodolfo (1970)
- El Insuperable Rodolfo (1971)
- De Primera (1971)
- El Ídolo Con Los Ídolos (1971)
- Se Pusieron Las Pilas (with la orquesta Los Ídolos) (1971)
- Definitivamente... Rodolfo (1972)
- Se Pusieron Las Pilas Vol. 2 (with la orquesta Los Ídolos) (1972)
- Lo Máximo (with la orquesta Los Ídolos) (1972)
- Aquí Vienen (with Los Bestiales) (1972)
- Rodolfo (1973)
- La Prima (with Los Bestiales) (1973)
- Sabor De Bestiales (with Los Bestiales) (1973)
- El Primerísimo (1974)
- A Quién No le Gusta Eso (with orquesta La Típica RA7) (1974)
- Baladista Sentimental (1976)
- Bailable (with orquesta La Típica RA7) (1975)
- Muy Bailable (with Típica RA7 y Los Hispanos) (1976)
- Show Bailable (with orquesta La Típica RA7) (1976)
- Sensacional (1977)
- La Pena De Mi Viejo (1978)
- De Regreso (1978)
- De Regreso (1978)
- Qué Chévere Vol. 1 (1979)
- Qué Chévere Vol. 2 (1980)
- El De Siempre (1980)
- El Incomparable (1981)
- Qué Chévere Vol. 3 (1981)
- Qué Chévere Vol. 4 (1982)
- Pa' Romper Parlantes (with El Grupo Monteadentro) (1982)
- El De Siempre Vol. 2 (1982)
- Qué Chévere Vol. 5 (1983)
- El Mano a Mano Del Año Vol. 1 (with Gustavo Quintero) (1984)
- El Mano a Maño Del Año Vol. 2 (with Gustavo Quintero) (1985)
- El Internacional (1985)
- Durísimo Bailable (1987)
- Rumba Bailable ¡¡Hasta las seis de la mañana!! (1988)
- Baladas Y Sentimiento (1988)
- Los Hispanos Y La Típica RA7 Con Rodolfo!! (1989)
- Lo Último En Bailable (1991)
- Cantares De Navidad (1991)
- Lo Nuevo (1992)
- El Mejor De Siempre (1993)
- El Espectacular (1995)
- El Cantante De Todos Los Tiempos (1996)
- Nos Fuimos (1997)
- Se Prendió El Fogón (1998)
- Fantástico (2000)
- De Regreso: Tropical y Original (2002)
- El Ídolo De Siempre (2002)

Compilations

- Grandes Éxitos de Los Hispanos con Rodolfo (1990)
- La voz que se nos fue (2007)
