= La Colegiala =

Song by Walter León Aguilar

"La Colegiala" ("the schoolgirl" in Spanish) is an iconic Latin song composed in 1975 by Walter León Aguilar, leader of the Peruvian cumbia ensemble Los Ilusionistas, and made hugely popular in the early 1980s by the Colombian singer Rodolfo Aicardi, crediting it to Rodolfo y su Tipica RA7.

== Los Ilusionistas original version ==
Walter León Aguilar, leader of the cumbia music band Los Ilusionistas, composed the song inspired by a young girl who was passing by while León Aguilar was riding a public bus. He called his friend, singer Carlos Ramirez Centeno, to sing and record the song for the first time in 1977. The song was a hit in Peru, mainly in the rural areas of its capital city Lima.

== Rodolfo y su Tipica RA7 cover version ==
Rodolfo used the arrangements of the version of El Combo Palacio (1980). El Combo Palacio is en Peruvian cumbia band. The director of the band Óscar 'Pitin' Sanchez made the arrangements that we know worldwide. The song was popularized in France and continental Europe in 1981 through the usage of the Rodolfo y su Tipica RA7 version for a Nescafé advertisement broadcast on French television. A longer version of the Nescafé ad was used in movie theatres. The ad concept had been tried initially in Ecuador by the ad agency Publicis, later spreading in other Latin American countries before making it to Europe.

In 1982, the Rodolfo y su Tipica version was released as a single in France by RCA, with the B-side containing "La Subienda", composed by Senon Palacio and interpreted by Gabriel Romero. Nescafé sales hugely increased as a result.

== Other versions ==
"La Colegiala" was later remade and remixed in various versions and languages. Notable versions include remakes by La Sonora Dinamita (1982), Gary Low (1984, German Italo disco version promoted in German-speaking markets, in the Benelux and in Italy; also reached number one in Spain), Alex Bueno (1990), Café Latino (1992), Caló (1995), and another version in 2007, Caló featuring Margarita La Diosa de la Cumbia.

Further versions were made by the Gipsy Kings, Jean-Claude Borelly (France), Fausto Papetti (Italy), Sandra Reemer (the Netherlands), Miguelo (Chile), Pastor López (Venezuela), and Parchis (Spain).

In 2017, The Boy Next Door revived it in a remix. The release was credited to The Boy Next Door and Fresh Coast featuring Jody Bernal.

=== Versions in other languages and adaptations ===
Richard Gotainer adapted it in the French language titled "Les frappés du café", Serge Nelson as "Les frappés du café (La Colegiala Remix)", and in 2004 Crooked Stilo retitled it as "Mis Colegialas". İdo Tatlıses released it in the Turkish language as "Sen". King África released it as "Africana", with additional changes in lyrics and music. In 2010, Belle Perez released it with notable changes in Spanish language lyrics.

In 2026, German electronic producer Topic and American singer Becky G released the single "Sorry Papi", a bilingual English and Spanish house music adaptation that features a prominent interpolation of the song's melody.

The Indian film Ullaasam's soundtrack contains the song "Cho Larey" which is based on "La Colegiala".

== See also ==
- List of number-one singles of 1984 (Spain)
