= Diego Escalona =

Mexican actor (born 2010)

- Born: Diego Escalona Zaragoza; December 13, 2010 (age 14); Mexico City, Mexico, North America
- Occupation: Actor
- Years active: 2013–present
- Notable work: Mi corazón es tuyo, La piloto, La suerte de Loli
- Awards: Bravo Award for Best Child Actor (2018)

Diego Escalona Zaragoza (December 13, 2010) is a Mexican actor known for his roles in television series such as Mi corazón es tuyo, A que no me dejas, and La suerte de Loli.

== Biography ==
Diego made his on-screen debut in the 2013 telenovela Corazón indomable, portraying the heartwarming character Miguelito at just three years old. His performance won immediate public affection and marked the beginning of a steady acting career.

In 2014–2015, he appeared as Mauricio González Sáenz nicknamed “Gansito” in Mi corazón es tuyo, where his portrayal left a memorable impression on viewers

Between 2015 and 2018, Diego expanded his television presence with roles in several prominent telenovelas and series like as A que no me dejas, Mujeres de negro, Enamorándome de Ramón and La piloto.

In 2020, Escalona appeared in the Telemundo telenovela La doña, portraying Ángel Contreras, the son of the character played by Carlos Ponce. That same year, he participated in the Mexican supernatural horror film La marca del demonio, where he played the role of young Karl Nüni.

In 2021, he was cast as Nicolás "Nicky" Torres in the Spanish-language American television series in Los Angeles La suerte de Loli, a comedy-drama produced by Telemundo. In the series, he worked alongside Silvia Navarro and Osvaldo Benavides.

In 2022, Escalona appeared in the Vix+ original series La mujer del diablo, playing the role of Rodrigo. The following year, in 2023, he was cast as Tony Uriarte in the TelevisaUnivision telenovela Golpe de suerte.

In 2025, he appeared as Lucas in the reboot of Rosario Tijeras, further solidifying his presence in contemporary Mexican television drama.

== Filmography ==
Television performances
Year	Title	Role	Notes
2013	Corazón indomable	Miguelito	Supporting role
2014–2015	Mi corazón es tuyo	Mauricio "Gansito" González Sáenz	Main role
2015–2016	A que no me dejas	Mauricio "Mau" Almonte / Mauricio "Mau" Fonseca Murat / Camilo Fonseca Olmedo	Main role
2016	Yago	Unknown	Guest star
2016	Mujeres de negro	Diego Zamora Leal	Supporting role
2017	Enamorándome de Ramón	Diego Fernández	Supporting role
2018	La Piloto	Arley Jr. Mejía Cadena	Supporting role (season 2)
2020	La Doña	Ángel Contreras	Recurring role (season 2)
2021	La suerte de Loli	Nicolás "Nicky" Torres	Main role
2022	La mujer del diablo	Rodrigo	Supporting role
2023	Golpe de suerte	Tony Uriarte	Main role
2025	Rosario Tijeras	Lucas	

Film performances
Year	Title	Role	Notes
2020	La marca del demonio	Young Karl Nüni	Supporting role

== Awards ==
Awards and Nominations
Year	Award	Category	Work	Result	Organization / Presenter
2018	Bravo Awards	Best Child Actor	La piloto	Won	Asociación Rafael Banquells
