= Nescafé =

Coffee brand made by Nestlé

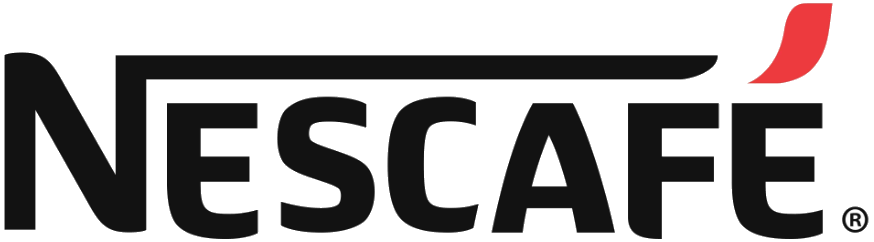

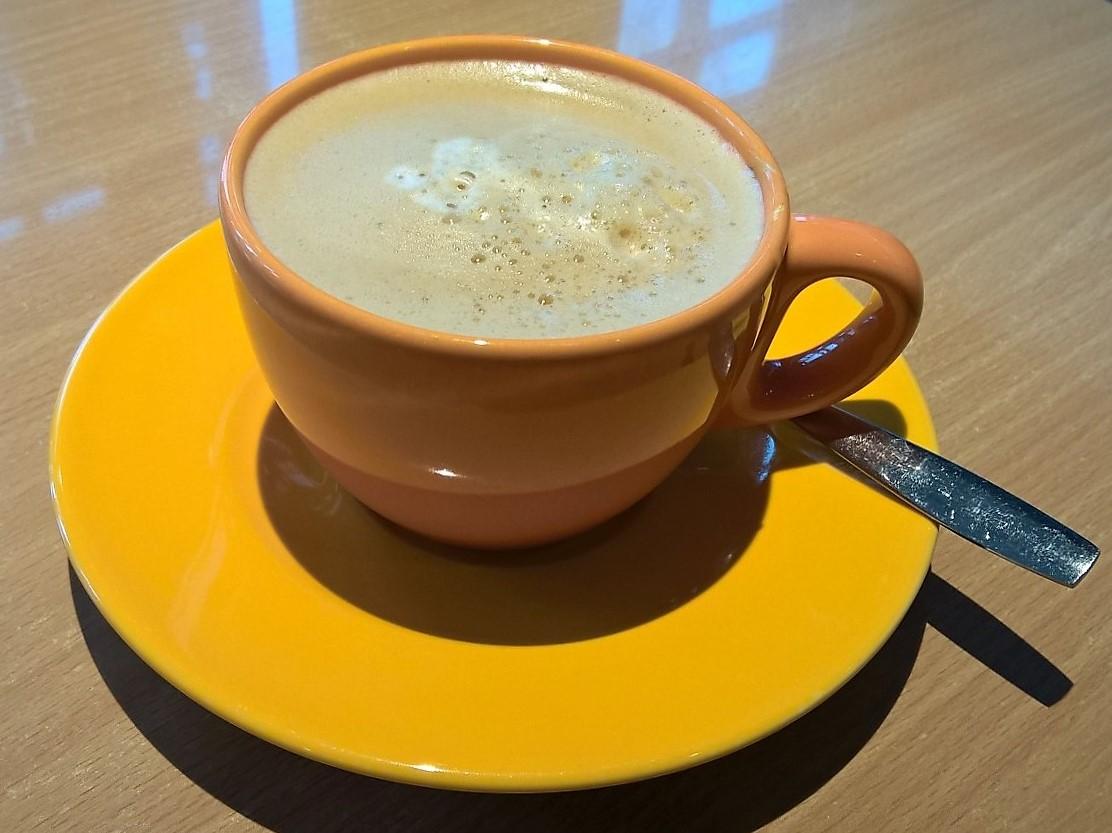
- Product type: Instant coffee
- Current owner: Nestlé
- Country: Switzerland
- Introduced: April 1, 1938; 88 years ago
- Markets: Worldwide
- Tagline: One good day coming up (2004–2005); One Moment, One Nescafé (2006–2014); It all starts with a Nescafé. (2014–2023); Make your world (2023–present)
- Website: nescafe.com

Nescafé is a brand of instant coffee sold by the multinational food and drink corporation Nestlé. It comes in many different forms. The name is a portmanteau of the words "Nestlé" and "café". Nestlé first introduced their flagship coffee brand in Switzerland on April 1, 1938.

== History ==
At the initiative of Sudameris, a French-Italian bank that served markets in South America, which had accumulated a large coffee surplus in its warehouses, Nestlé began developing a new instant coffee product in 1932 to use the surplus of beans. The large supply of surplus came from the lowered coffee prices in Brazil which resulted from the Wall Street Crash of 1929.

Max Morgenthaler led the development project of the instant coffee product, which initially used spray drying to create the product from liquid coffee. Nestlé introduced the new product under the brand name "Nescafé" on April 1, 1938. It became an American staple during World War II.

== Marketing ==
In the United States, Nestlé used the Nescafé name on its products until the late 1960s. Later, Nestlé introduced a new brand in Canada and the US called Taster's Choice, which supplanted Nescafé for many years. The company continues to sell Taster's Choice as a separate product, branded as superior to Nescafé and higher priced.

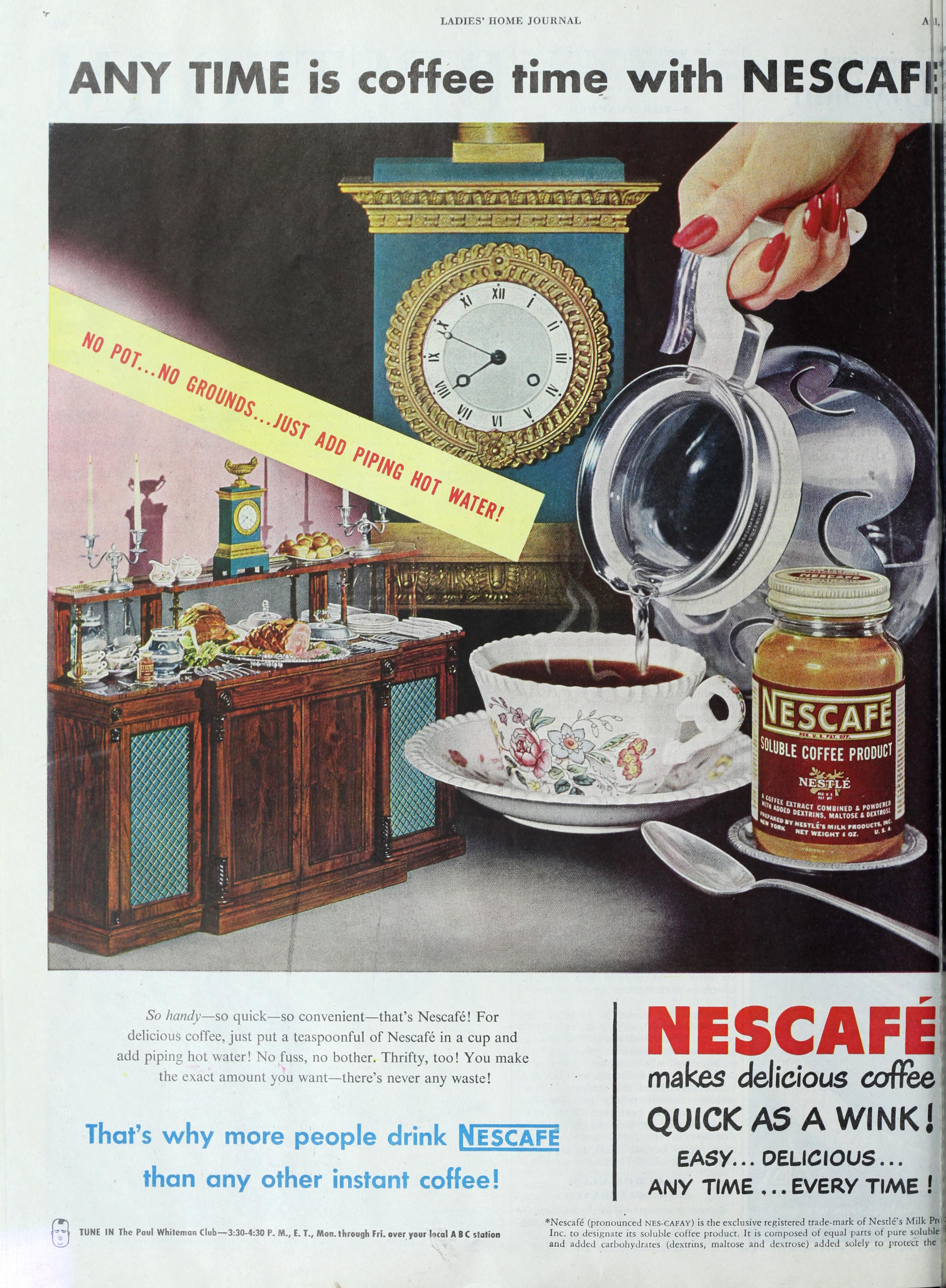
"Any time is coffee time with Nescafé", 1948 advertisement

In the United Kingdom, a television advertisement campaign, the Gold Blend couple starring Anthony Head and Sharon Maughan ran in 12 instalments between 1987 and 1993. The first 11 episodes were released as a promotional compilation video called Love Over Gold in 1993. A novelisation of the same name written by Susan Moody (under the pseudonym Susannah James) was released in the same year. The legendary boxer Chris Eubank and soccer star Ian Wright featured separately in television ads in the late 1990s and 2000s.

Before the Gold Blend couple made their debut, a series of British adverts for Nescafé starred Gareth Hunt, shown shaking his closed hand and opening it to reveal coffee beans, then smelling the aroma. Greene, who starred in some 26 adverts, commented that the shaking of the beans was crucial to the campaign's success, due to their sexual connotations. By 1986, adverts in this campaign also starred Sarah Greene and Mike Smith. In the 1986 Smash Hits readers poll, Nescafé were simultaneously ranked fifth in the "Best TV Ad" category and first in the "Worst TV Ad" category.

In 2003, the company reintroduced the Nescafé brand in Canada and the US, and the product is now known as Nescafé Taster's Choice. It is sold in North American supermarkets in both glass and plastic packaging.

While the Nescafé brand was created for soluble coffee, it has subsequently been used as an umbrella brand on a number of instant coffee products, including, in the UK, Gold Blend and Blend 37 freeze-dried coffees.

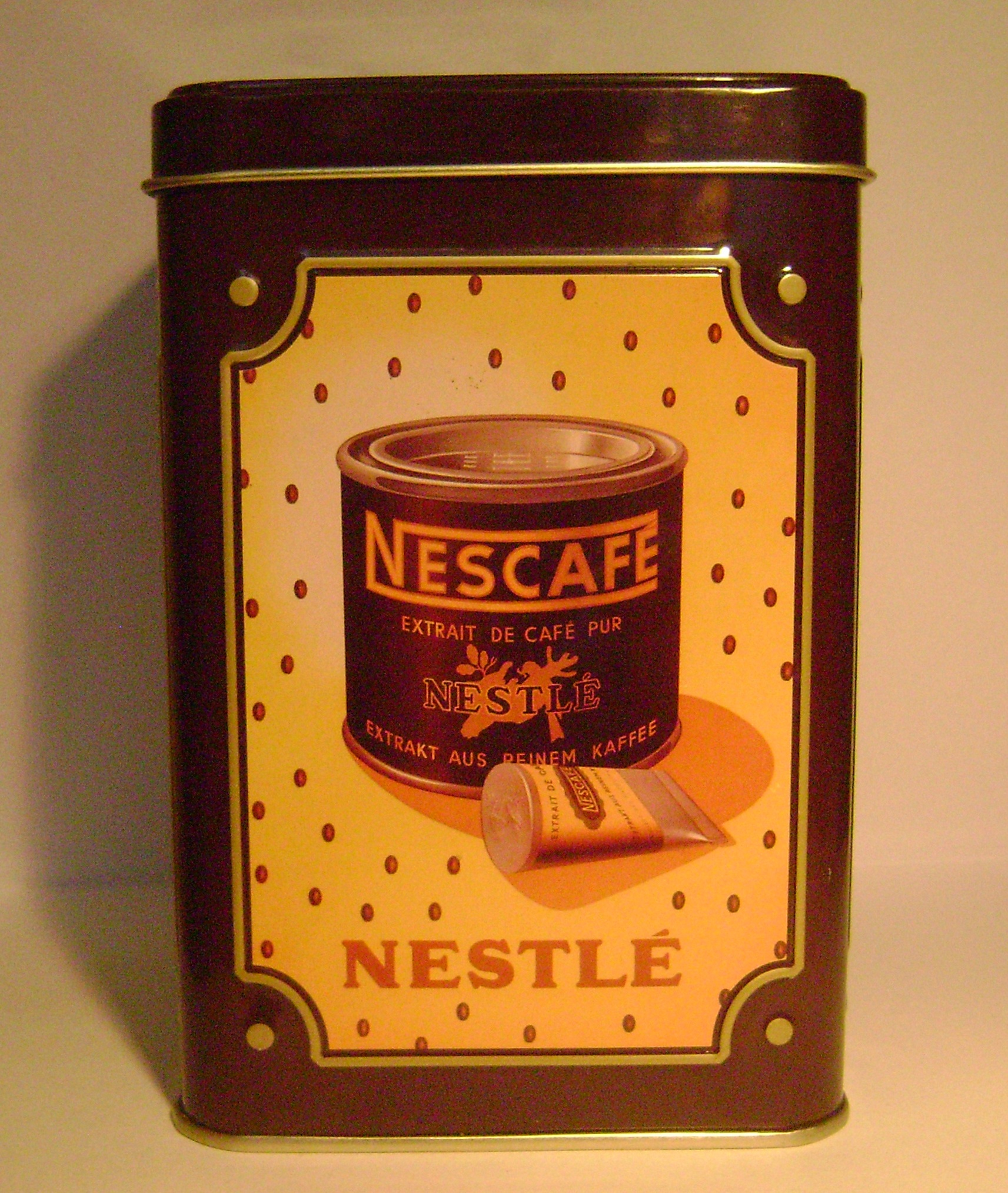
Old Nescafé tin

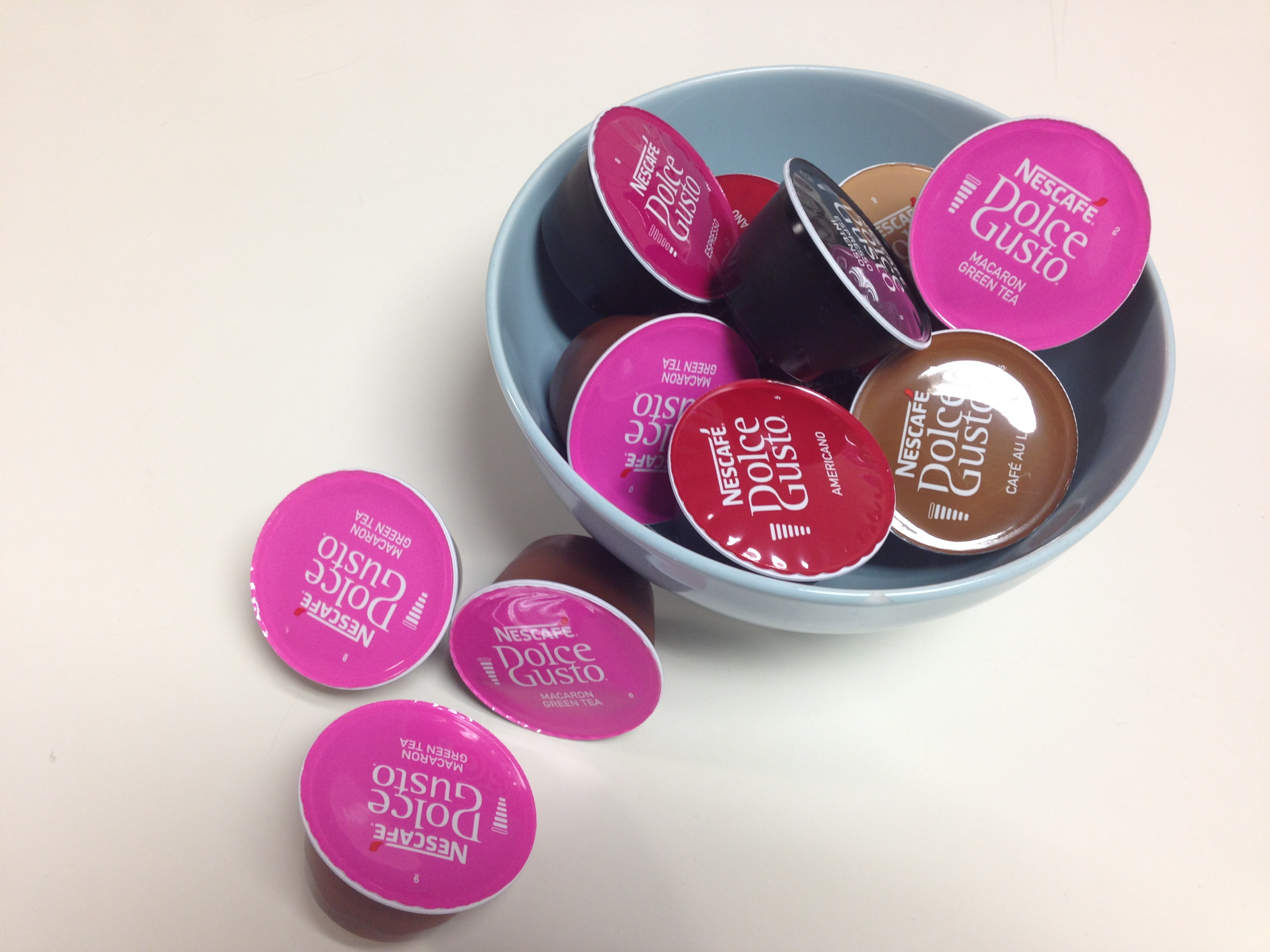
"Dolce Gusto" capsules

In 2006, Nescafé launched the new coffee machine system "Dolce Gusto" ("sweet taste" in Italian). The system allows consumers to make various styles of coffees themselves (cappuccino, latte macchiato, espresso, lungo, etc.). Additionally, hot chocolate and cold drinks can be prepared with the machine. The machines are now sold in more than 60 countries. Unlike other Nescafé products, most Dolce Gusto beverages use roasted and ground coffee beans, instead of instant coffee.

In the UK in August 2009, Nescafé unveiled a £43 million ad campaign for Nescafé, focusing on the purity of its coffee and featuring the strapline "Coffee at its brightest".

Nescafé was ranked 153rd among India's most trusted brands according to the Brand Trust Report 2012, a study conducted by Trust Research Advisory. In the Brand Trust Report 2013, Nescafé was ranked 230th among India's most trusted brands and subsequently, according to the Brand Trust Report 2014, Nescafé was ranked 209th among India's most trusted brands. Nestle India has branded instant coffee as Nescafe Classic and the 70:30 mix of instant coffee and chicory as Sunrise. In Australia and New Zealand, the original instant coffee is branded "Blend 43", originally to differentiate product made locally from imported beans, from the imported version.

In Pakistan, Nescafe launched an annual music show based on the same theme as of Coke Studio, named Nescafé Basement.

== Lawsuits ==
In February 2005, the Associated Press reported Nestlé lost a lawsuit and was ordered to pay US$15.6 million to Russell Christoff for using an image of him without his permission on their Taster's Choice label for approximately five years (1998–2003). The $15.6 million judgment was subsequently reversed in its entirety by the California Court of Appeal. On October 31, 2007, the California Supreme Court, with a vote of 6–0, granted review. On August 17, 2009, the court reversed the judgment (opinion S155242) and remanded the case to the trial court to consider whether the ad campaign covered a "single publication", which would have prevented Christoff from suing because the statute of limitations would have lapsed, or multiple publications.

== Influence in the world ==
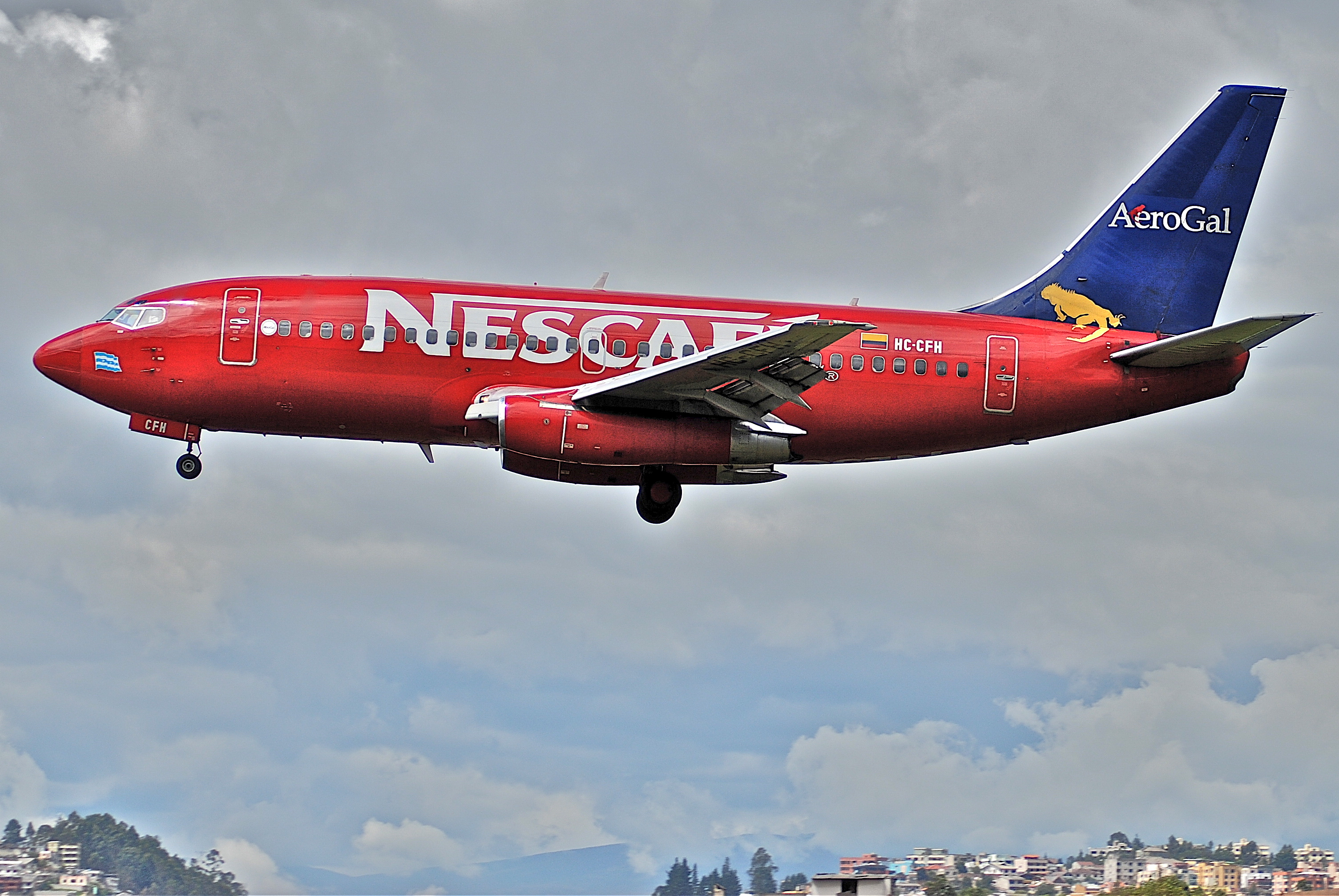
A Boeing 737-200 of AeroGal in a red "Nescafé" livery promotion

- In 1981, a commercial involving a train was made, the musical theme was "La Colegiala" composed by Rodolfo Aicardi.
- Due to the enormous popularity of Nescafé, during the Second World War, "all the production of the American plant was reserved only for the use of the military".
- In Ecuador, a Boeing 737-200 from the AeroGal company was painted red to promote the brand.
- In Chile, since 2009 the brand has sponsored and helped to restore a well-known Chilean theater that was in decline, making it the first Nescafé theater in the world and naming it the Nescafé Theater of the Arts. In previous years, the brand was sponsoring different stars of Canal 13, such as Esta Noche Fiesta and Tuesday 13, the 123 Nescafé competition and was for some time the sponsor of different campaigns of the Chilean Telethon, returning as sponsor to the campaign in 2011. In turn, its variant Nescafé Dolca was sponsor of Una Vez Más of Canal 13.
- In the Philippines, an advertising commercial was released in 2020 with their newest jingle and slogan, "Babangon tayo, susulong tayo" ("We will rise, we will advance").
- English rock band Muse successfully sued Nescafé in 2003 when their song "Feeling Good" was used in a television ad without permission and donated the £500,000 compensation to Oxfam.

== See also ==
- Nespresso, another brand of coffee made by Nestlé
