= Los Hispanos (Colombian band) =

Colombian band

Los Hispanos is a Colombian band founded in 1964. By Jairo Jimenez Jaramillo Their main vocalist was Gustavo Quintero who later retired from the band to form his own group "Los Graduados". That's when he was replaced by Rodolfo Aicardi. Other band members included Piter Botina, René Cárdenas, Jorge Laun, Jorge Grajales, Body Esmall, Tony Contreras, Jorge Restrepo (aka as J .R. Quintero), Pedro Julio Ruiz, Mario Sánchez, Jaime Ley, César Augusto, Jairo Jiménez and the Ecuadorian Gustavo Velázquez.
