= List of number-one singles of 1984 (Spain) =

This is a list of the Spanish Singles number-ones of 1984.

== Chart history ==
Issue date	Song	Artist
2 January	"Karma Chameleon"	Culture Club
9 January	"Karma Chameleon"	Culture Club
16 January	"Karma Chameleon"	Culture Club
23 January	"Karma Chameleon"	Culture Club
30 January	"Karma Chameleon"	Culture Club
6 February	"Say Say Say"	Paul McCartney featuring Michael Jackson
13 February	"Thriller"	Michael Jackson
20 February	"Thriller"	Michael Jackson
27 February	"Thriller"	Michael Jackson
5 March	"Thriller"	Michael Jackson
12 March	"Thriller"	Michael Jackson
19 March	"All Night Long (All Night)"	Lionel Richie
26 March	"Thriller"	Michael Jackson
2 April	"Thriller"	Michael Jackson
9 April	"Thriller"	Michael Jackson
16 April	"Thriller"	Michael Jackson
23 April	"Thriller"	Michael Jackson
30 April	"Thriller"	Michael Jackson
7 May	"Relax"	Frankie Goes to Hollywood
14 May	"Somebody's Watching Me"	Rockwell
21 May	"Lobo-Hombre en París"	La Unión
28 May	"Street Dance"	Break Machine
4 June	"Olvídame y Pega La Vuelta"	Pimpinela
11 June	"Pánico en El Edén"	Tino Casal
18 June	"Lobo-Hombre en París"	La Unión
25 June	"Lobo-Hombre en París"	La Unión
2 July	"Lobo-Hombre en París"	La Unión
9 July	"Lobo-Hombre en París"	La Unión
16 July	"Lobo-Hombre en París"	La Unión
23 July	"Lobo-Hombre en París"	La Unión
30 July	"Lobo-Hombre en París"	La Unión
6 August	"Lobo-Hombre en París"	La Unión
13 August	"La Colegiala"	Gary Low
20 August	"La Colegiala"	Gary Low
27 August	"La Colegiala"	Gary Low
3 September	"La Colegiala"	Gary Low
10 September	"High Energy"	Evelyn Thomas
17 September	"High Energy"	Evelyn Thomas
24 September	"High Energy"	Evelyn Thomas
1 October	"All of You"	Julio Iglesias and Diana Ross
8 October	"All of You"	Julio Iglesias and Diana Ross
15 October	"I Just Called to Say I Love You"	Stevie Wonder
22 October	"Tentación"	José Luis Perales
29 October	"I Just Called to Say I Love You"	Stevie Wonder
5 November	"I Just Called to Say I Love You"	Stevie Wonder
12 November	"I Just Called to Say I Love You"	Stevie Wonder
19 November	"I Just Called to Say I Love You"	Stevie Wonder
26 November	"I Just Called to Say I Love You"	Stevie Wonder
3 December	"Sevilla"	Miguel Bosé
10 December	"I Just Called to Say I Love You"	Stevie Wonder
17 December	"¿Cómo Pudiste Hacerme Esto a Mí?"	Alaska y Dinarama
24 December	"¿Cómo Pudiste Hacerme Esto a Mí?"	Alaska y Dinarama
31 December	"¿Cómo Pudiste Hacerme Esto a Mí?"	Alaska y Dinarama

== See also ==
- 1984 in music
- List of number-one hits (Spain)
- List of number-one singles of the 1980s in Spain
