= Margarita Vargas =

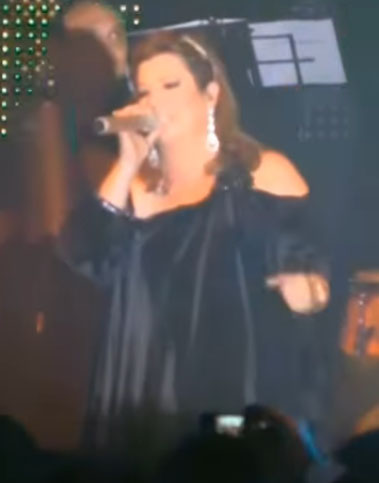

Background information
- Born: Margarita María de Santa Teresita Vargas Gaviria; October 3, 1960 (age 65); Medellín, Colombia
- Genres: Cumbia, Salsa, Latin,
- Occupation: Singer
- Years active: 1984–present
- Labels: Columbia, Sony Music Latin, Sony Music Mexico

Margarita María de Santa Teresita Vargas Gaviria (Spanish pronunciation: [maɾɣaˈɾita ˈβaɾɣas]) better known by her stage name Margarita La Diosa de la Cumbia, is a Colombian-Mexican singer.
