= Ghana Special: Modern Highlife, Afro-Sounds & Ghanaian Blues 1968–1981 =

2009 compilation album

Compilation album by Various Artists
- Released: 2 November 2009
- Genre: Highlife
- Label: Soundway Records

Ghana Special: Modern Highlife, Afro-Sounds & Ghanaian Blues 1968–1981 is a compilation album released by Soundway Records on 2 November 2009. The compilation is focused on highlife, a Ghanaian musical style that gained popularity across western Africa in the first half of the 20th century. The tracks from the compilation date from a period of political and economic instability in Ghana.

== Background and release ==
Soundway Records was founded in 2002, and its first release was a compilation called Ghana Soundz, consisting of Ghanaian afrobeat and funk from the 1970s; a second volume followed in 2004. In 2007 Soundway released Nigeria Special: Modern Highlife, Afro–Sounds & Nigerian Blues 1970–76, starting the series of which Ghana Special is a part. Soundway went on to release a Kenya Special compilation in 2013, and in 2024 released a direct sequel to Ghana Special entitled Ghana Special 2: Electronic Highlife & Afro Sounds In The Diaspora, 1980–93.

== Critical reception ==
Professional ratings
Review scores
Source	Rating
AllMusic	4.5/5 stars
Robert Christgau	(1-star Honorable Mention)
Pitchfork	8.5/10
Songlines	4/5 stars

Jude Rogers of The Guardian described Ghana Special as "rare and glitteringly good afropop". Jon Caramanica of the New York Times preferred the compilation to 2007's Nigeria Special, writing that "the vocals here are sweeter, the rhythms more delicate, the songs slower, lighter and more beguiling." Robert Barry of the Quietus described the album as having an "overwhelming sense of joy and prescience."

Joe Tangari of Pitchfork rated the compilation 8.5/10, writing that "Ghana Special offers a spoil of riches you can dance to in any language." He called the extensive liner notes "a treasure trove of backstory". Writing for AllMusic, Phil Freeman rated the album 4.5/5, and said that "most of the [tracks] will be incomprehensible to a U.S. listener -- and it won't matter one bit, because the rhythms and melodies are so overpowering and forceful." Chris Meinst of Songlines called the album "beautifully packaged and researched...a considered snapshot from an era that avoids musical classification."

== Track listing ==
Disc 1 track listing
No.	Title	Artist	Length
1.	"Kai Wawa"	The Mercury Dance Band	3:01
2.	"Owuo Adaadaa Me"	T.O. Jazz	2:52
3.	"Din Ya Sugri"	Christy Azuma & Uppers International	7:03
4.	"Aaya Lolo"	The Barbecues	3:48
5.	"Ohiani Sua Efir"	Asaase Ase	4:02
6.	"Bofoo Beye Abowa Den"	St. Peter & The Holymen	3:15
7.	"Nya Asem Hwe"	City Boys Band	4:51
8.	"Edinya Benya"	Hedzoleh Soundz	3:17
9.	"Hwehwe Mu Yi Mpena"	The Cutlass Dance Band	3:18
10.	"Sei Nazo"	Dr. K. Gyasi & His Noble Kings	3:02
11.	"I Go Die For You"	Kyeremateng Atwede & The Kyeremateng Stars	5:23
12.	"Obi Agye Me Dofo"	Vis A Vis	9:51
13.	"Twer Nyame" (excerpt)	Ebo Taylor	5:22
14.	"Mi Nsumõõ Bo Dõnn"	The Big Beats	3:39
15.	"Odo Mmera"	Pa Steele's African Brothers	3:01
16.	"You Monopolise Me"	The Ogyatanaa Show Band	3:14

Disc 2 track listing
No.	Title	Artist	Length
1.	"Wompe Masem"	The African Brothers International Band	4:19
2.	"Akoko Ba"	Gyedu-Blay Ambolley & His Creations	5:26
3.	"Akampanye"	The Sweet Talks	4:27
4.	"Enuanom Adofo"	Houghas Sorowonko	3:10
5.	"Bukom"	Oscar Sulley's Nzele Soundz	3:28
6.	"You Can Go"	Bokoor Band	3:22
7.	"Kyenkyen Bi Adu M'Awu"	K. Frimpong & His Cubano Fiestas	6:57
8.	"Dr. Solutsu" (Feat. Fela Anikulapo Kuti)	Basa Basa Soundz	3:22
9.	"Tamale"	Pagadeja	3:11
10.	"Omusu Da Fe M'musu"	Hedzoleh Soundz	4:58
11.	"Yahyia Mu"	The Uhuru Dance Band	4:11
12.	"Noble Kings (Yako Aba)"	Dr. K. Gyasi & His Noble Kings	5:46
13.	"Bindiga"	The Wellis Band	3:25
14.	"Boombaya"	Boombaya	3:39
15.	"Owuo"	Sawaaba Soundz	4:20
16.	"Them Go Talk Of You"	The Cutlass Dance Band	3:14
17.	"Sisi Mbon"	Honny & The Bees Band	6:47

== Personnel ==
- Miles Cleret – compliled by, liner notes, research
- Nick Robbins – mastering
