= Ghana Special 2: Electronic Highlife & Afro Sounds In The Diaspora, 1980–93 =

Ghana Special 2: Electronic Highlife & Afro Sounds in the Diaspora, 1980–93

Compilation album by Various artists
- Released: 10 May 2024
- Genre: Highlife, burger highlife
- Length: 1:51:52
- Label: Soundway

Ghana Special 2: Electronic Highlife & Afro Sounds in the Diaspora, 1980–93 is a compilation album released by Soundway Records on 10 May 2024. The compilation collects highlife, a style of music from Ghana, which underwent a shift to more electronic styles in the 1980s.

== Background and release ==
Ghana Special 2 is the sequel to Ghana Special: Modern Highlife, Afro-Sounds & Ghanaian Blues 1968–1981, a compilation of Ghanaian highlife released by Soundway in 2009.

By the late 1970s, economic recession and political instability had led many Ghanaians to emigrate. David Hutcheon of Mojo writes that "in Ghana, the venerated highlife giants were replaced by punks who could record quickly and cheaply using synths. Many of them were based in Europe or North America". Performing music in Ghana was also made more difficult by high tariffs on recording equipment. This led to diverse hybrid styles of highlife, such as burger highlife, being made by the Ghanaian diaspora. Ghana Special 2 collects highlife from this period, up to the Ghanaian return to democracy in 1993.

The tracks on this compilation tend to run longer than those on the first volume, because they are generally taken from LP or cassette releases rather than 45s. Some of the featured artists, like Pat Thomas and Gyedu-Blay Ambolley, were well known in Ghana before the 1980s, while others became well known for playing highlife in new ways.

== Promotion ==
On 11 July 2024 Pat Thomas and Charles Omoah played a show with K.O.B. and the Kwashibu Area Band at Haus der Kulturen der Welt in Berlin to promote the album.

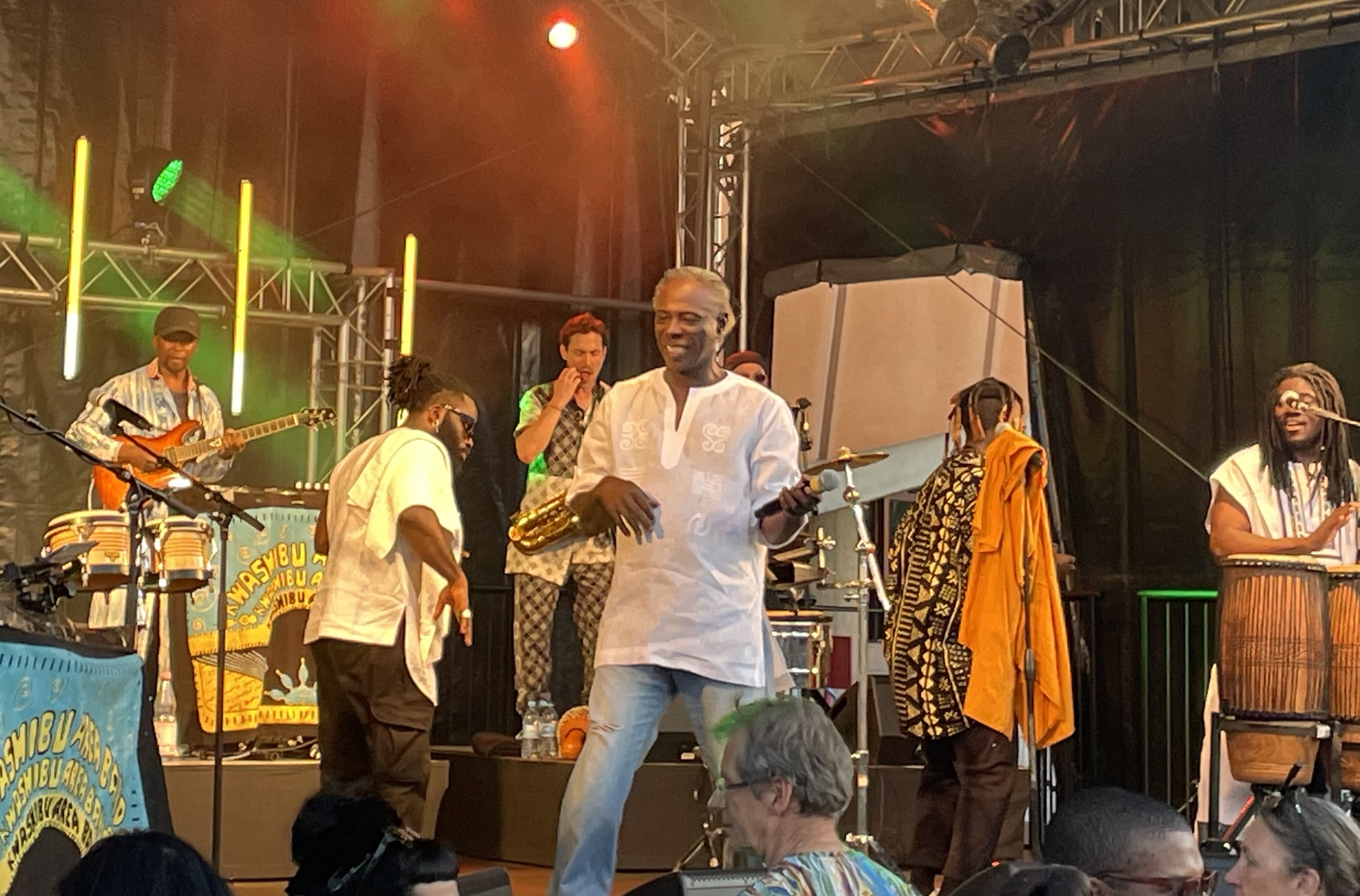
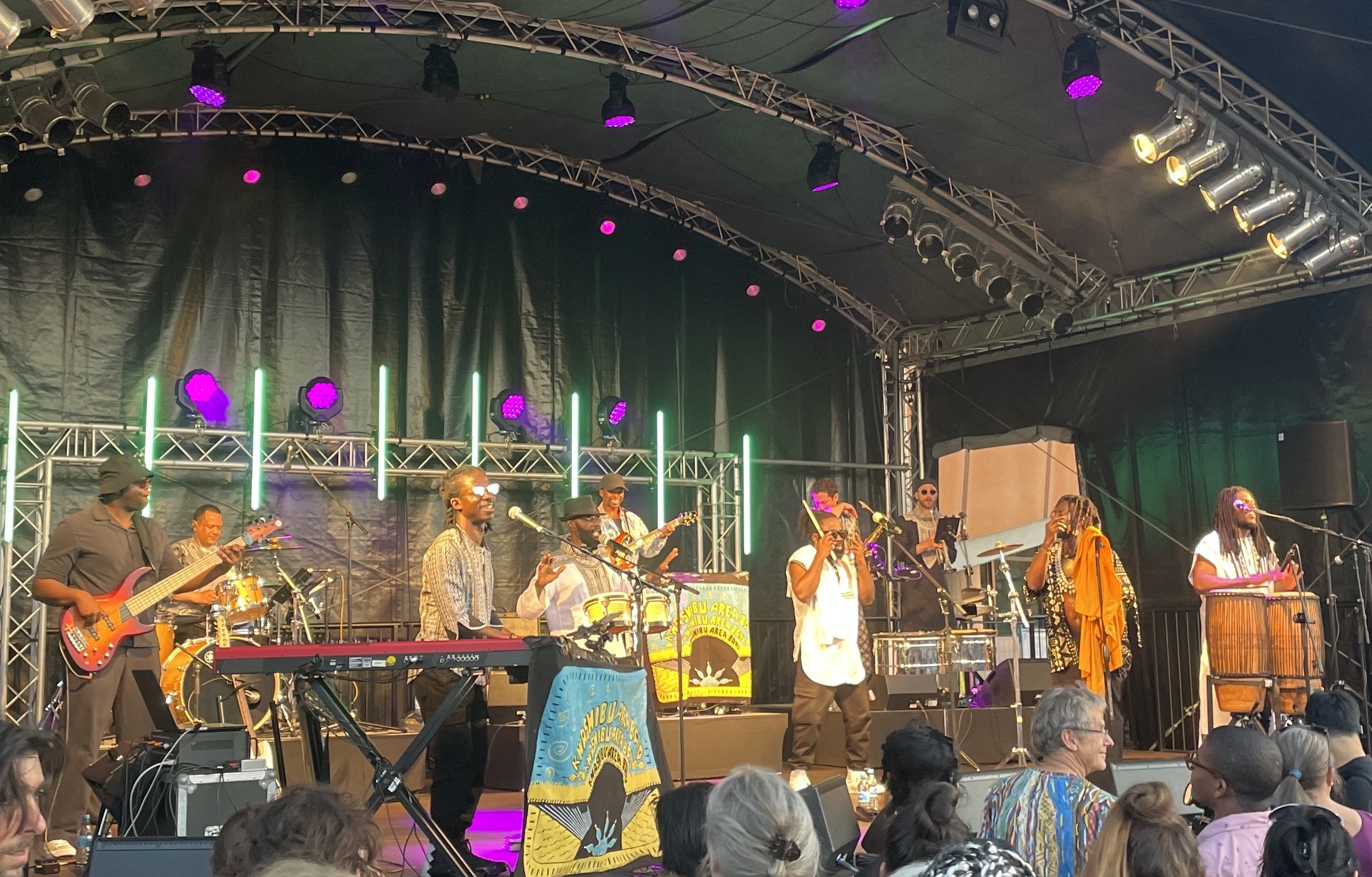
Charles Omoah and Pat Thomas performing with the Kwashibu Area Band at HKW

== Critical reception ==
Professional ratings
Aggregate scores
Source	Rating
Metacritic	78/100
Review scores
Source	Rating
AllMusic	4/5 stars
Jazzthetik	4/5 stars
Mojo	4/5 stars
PopMatters	7/10
Record Collector	4/5 stars
Songlines	3/5 stars
Uncut	7/10

Paul Simpson of AllMusic described the compilation as "documenting an era in which [Ghana's] music was heavily influenced by post-disco and boogie, new wave, and Caribbean sounds such as zouk and soca." He found the best track to be "Barima Nsu" by Kwasi Afari Minta, which he called a "hypnotic and haunting ten-minute whirlwind".

David Hutcheon of Mojo rated the album 4/5 stars, saying "the bulk of this collection of outsider art holds up 30-plus years on." PopMatters rated the compilation 7/10, calling it "a brilliant slice of pop music history, telling stories of movement and innovation via irresistible grooves." Adrian Nowak of Westdeutscher Rundfunk called the album an "exciting chronicle of rare pearls and a wonderful testimony to the unifying power of music." Writing for The Wire, Francis Gooding described Ghana Special 2 as "two patties of sizzling burger highlife." Uncut called the album "uneven but absorbing."

== Track listing ==
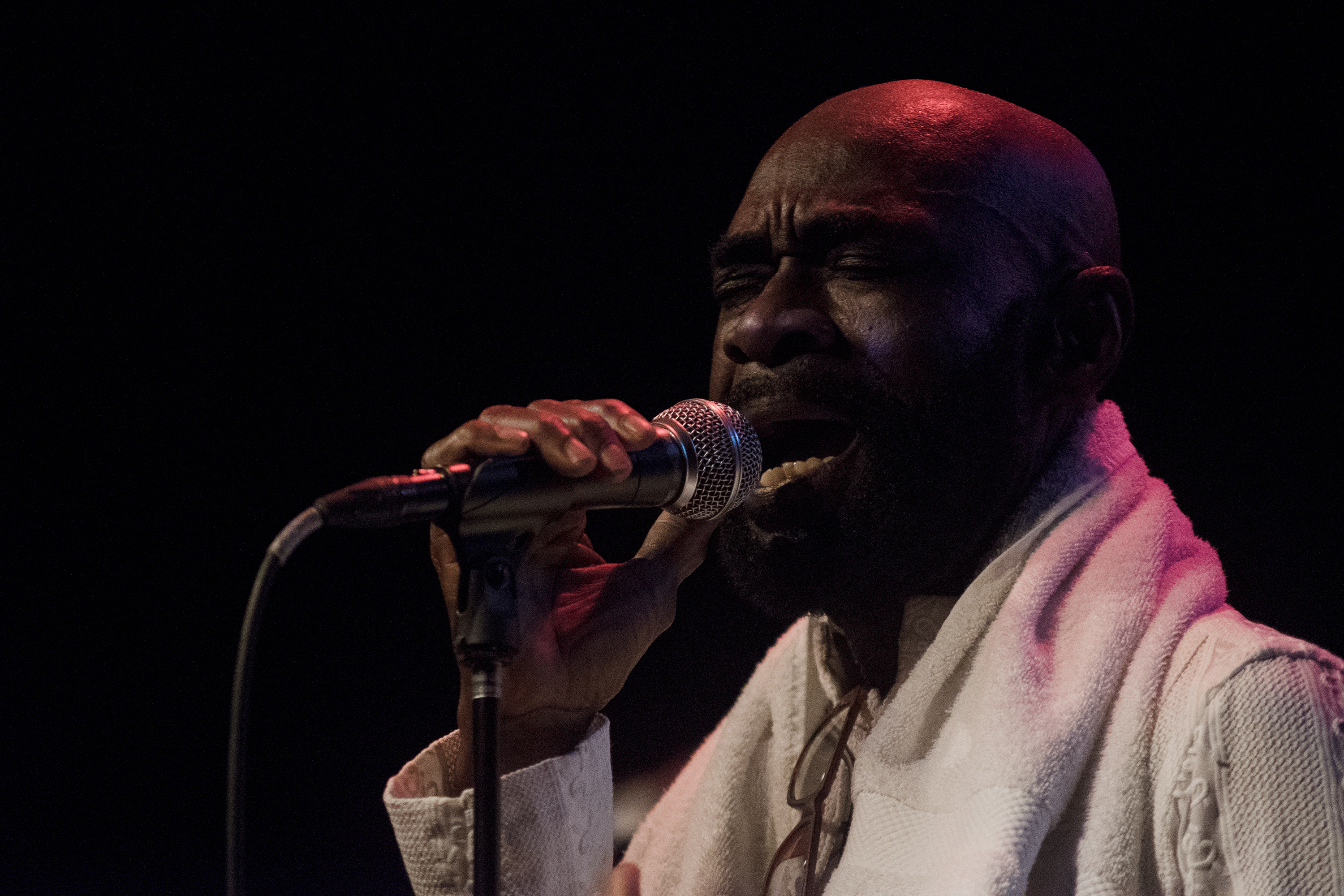
Pat Thomas re-released "Gye Wani" for this compilation on Ghanaian Independence Day, 6 March 2024.

Disc 1 track listing
No.	Title	Artist	Length
1.	"Ebe Ye Yie Ni"	The Godfathers	6:06
2.	"Gye Wani"	Pat Thomas	5:24
3.	"M.C. Mambo"	Pepper, Onion, Ginger & Salt	5:16
4.	"Adjoa Amisa"	Andy Vans	8:34
5.	"Kaakyire Nua"	George Darko	7:54
6.	"Obiara Bewu"	Rex Gyamfi	6:49
7.	"Anoma Koro"	Starlite	9:19
8.	"Alaiye"	Abdul Raheem	4:26
9.	"Asafo"	Jon K	4:46
Total length:			58:34

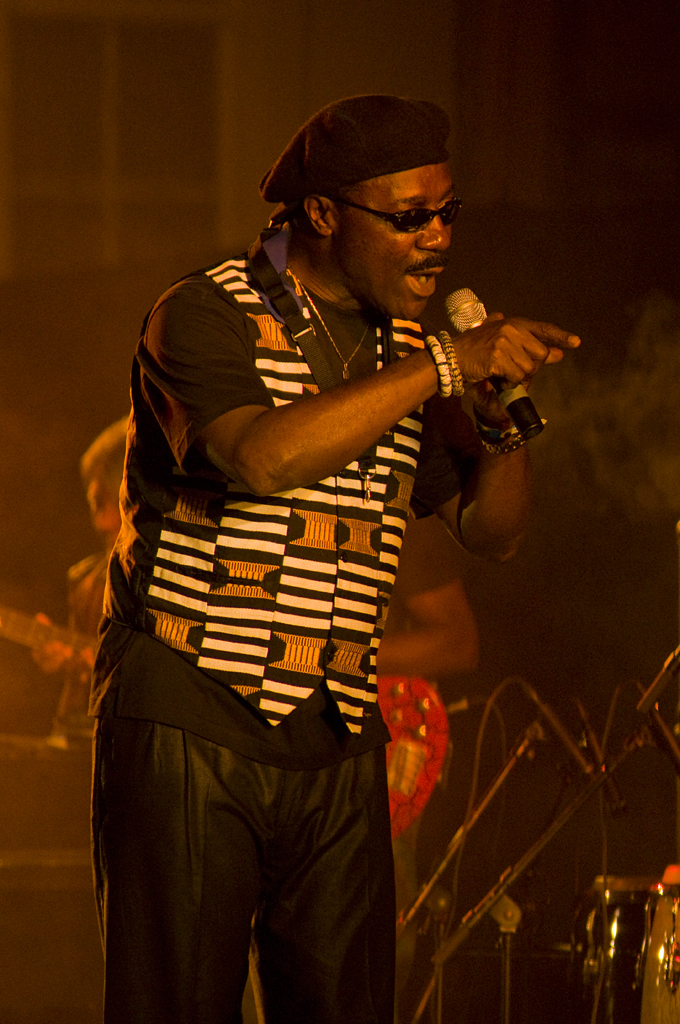
Gyedu-Blay Ambolley also featured on Soundway's first release, Ghana Soundz.

Disc 2 track listing
No.	Title	Artist	Length
1.	"Barima Nsu"	Kwasi Afari Minta	10:10
2.	"Otanhunu" (feat. Ata Kak)	Marijata	7:34
3.	"Apple"	Gyedu-Blay Ambolley	6:05
4.	"Jigi Jigi"	Dadadi	4:58
5.	"Fre Me (Call Me)"	Charles Amoah	6:21
6.	"New Dance"	Ernest Honny	4:03
7.	"Sii Nana"	Bessa Simons	5:47
8.	"Mumude"	Nan Mayen	3:18
9.	"Asobrachie"	Nana Budjei	5:02
Total length:			53:18

== Personnel ==
- Dan Elleson – restoration, mastering
- Lewis Heriz and Meurig Rees – artwork
