= Kwabena Onyina =

Ghanaian highlife musician (1932–2010)

- Also known as: King Onyina
- Born: Kwabena Onyina; 15 March 1932; Agona, Ashanti
- Origin: Ghana
- Died: May 2010 (aged 78)
- Genres: Highlife
- Occupation: Musician
- Instruments: guitar, piano, trumpet, saxophone, organ
- Years active: 1953–2010

Kwabena Onyina (15 March 1932 – May 2010), widely known as King Onyina, was a Ghanaian highlife guitarist, composer, and bandleader. A versatile multi-instrumentalist and influential figure in Ghana’s post-independence music scene, he played a key role in shaping the evolution of highlife music from the 1950s onward. Onyina also served as regional chairman of the Ashanti branch of the Musicians Union of Ghana (MUSIGA), stepping down later due to declining health.

== Music ==
=== Career ===
Onyina began playing guitar at the age of 16 and went on to form his first group, the Cooler's Band. The ensemble was later managed by Daniel Kyei, who renamed it Onyina's Guitar Band in 1953. That same year, the band made its first recordings with Decca Records.

In 1961, Onyina earned the nickname “King” after winning a national guitar band competition held in Accra. Among his most notable compositions are "Wiase Nsem Adoso," "Odo Ye Owu," "Lumumba," "Nantiyie," "Ohia Asoma Wo," and the widely recognized "The Destiny of Africa."

Following this recognition, he was invited to join a cultural delegation accompanying President Kwame Nkrumah on diplomatic tours to countries including Mali, Tunisia, Poland, and the Soviet Union in 1963. Other artists on this tour included E.K. Nyame, Dr. K. Gyasi, Bob Cole, and the Broadway Dance Band.

In 1964, King Onyina performed in London at a concert organized by the Ghana Musicians Union, helping introduce Ghanaian highlife music to an international audience.

=== Style and influence ===
King Onyina was known for his technical mastery and stylistic experimentation. In addition to the guitar, he played piano, trumpet, saxophone, and organ. His guitar technique integrated jazz harmonies and Western classical elements into traditional highlife structures, making his work stand out in an era dominated by rhythmic simplicity.

He was also a skilled composer of songs in both Twi and English, often weaving together social commentary, romantic themes, and Pan-African ideals. His musical contributions were both artistic and educational, as he reportedly mentored younger musicians and advocated for copyright awareness and musicians’ rights.

Onyina influenced an entire generation of Ghanaian artists, including his nephew Pat Thomas, Dr. K. Gyasi, T.D.B. Agyekum of the Happy Stars, Ofori Dominos, Lady Talata, and Otis Asamoah.

== Personal life and legacy ==
Kwabena Onyina was born in the town of Agona in the Ashanti Region of Ghana on 15 March 1932. He died in May 2010 at the age of 78 in his hometown.

Following his death, tributes came from across Ghana’s cultural and political spectrum. The Vice President of Ghana at the time called for stronger unity among musicians to protect their work, citing Onyina's legacy as emblematic of artistic excellence.

He is widely regarded as one of the foundational architects of modern Ghanaian highlife, remembered for his musical innovation, instrumental proficiency, and lifelong commitment to advancing the country’s musical heritage.
