= Steve Monite =

Nigerian singer and songwriter

- Born: 1961 (age 64–65); Benin City, Edo State, Nigeria
- Genres: Afro-boogie
- Years active: 1983–present
- Labels: His Master's Voice, Soundway Records

Steve Monite (born 1961) is a Nigerian singer and songwriter best known for the 1984 Afro-boogie song "Only You", the hit track and title of his album. The song had several versions and was produced by Chief Tony Okoroji for EMI Records in Nigeria.

Hailed as the holy grail of 1980s Nigerian funk by contemporary critics and record collectors, "Only You" has received renewed attention after being covered live at the 2017 FYF Fest by R&B singer Frank Ocean with backing instrumentation by Alex G. The track was also covered by Theophilus London, featuring Tame Impala, in October 2018. It was first reissued by Triassic Tusk Records in Screamers, Bangers & Cosmic Synths. Then picked up and released on Soundway Records' Doing It In Lagos: Boogie, Pop & Disco in 1980s Nigeria, a compilation of Nigerian music from the 1980s.

Monite's only album, Only You, was produced by Chief Tony Okoroji. Critics have noted its melodic darkness, space-age sound effects, and inventive instrumentation. The album also includes two versions of a track named after Nigerian writer Chinua Achebe’s 1958 novel Things Fall Apart. Original pressings of the album have sold for over $1,300. In 2017, Austrian label Presch Media GmbH bootlegged the album as part of a series of re-releases of rare Nigerian Afro-boogie recordings from the 1970s and '80s.

Only You, was reissued by Soundway Records in 2022.

== Discography ==
- Only You (1984)
