= Light in Your Mind =

Studio album by Cymbals
- Released: 25 August 2017
- Recorded: 2016–2017
- Studios: Total Refreshment Centre Studios; (London, England)
- Genres: New wave; indie rock; post-rock
- Length: 45:01
- Label: Tough Love Records
- Producer: Capitol K

Cymbals chronology
Age of Facture (2014)	Light in Your Mind (2017)

Singles from Light in Your Mind
- 1. "Decay" Released: 8 May 2017; 2. "Car Crash" Released: 29 June 2017; 3. "Where Nothing Can Be Defined" Released: 4 August 2017

Light in Your Mind is the third studio album by Cymbals, released on 25 August 2017, through Tough Love Records. It is the first album recorded by the band since the departure of founding band members Luke Carson and Neil Gillespie. The album was produced by Capitol K.

== Reception ==
Professional ratings
Review scores
Source	Rating
AllMusic	4.5/5 stars

Light in Your Mind was well-received by contemporary music critics upon its initial release. In a four-and-a-half star out of five review for AllMusic, writer Matt Collar found that the albums was "sanguine, deeply emotive, yet often brightly colored affair that reflects the turmoil and personal struggles the band went through prior to its recording."

== Track listing ==
All tracks are written by Jack Cleverly & Dan Simons.

Light in Your Mind
No.	Title	Length
1.	"Decay"	5:14
2.	"Car Crash"	5:49
3.	"Talk to Me"	4:09
4.	"I Thought I Knew You"	4:26
5.	"My Body [Winter Mix]"	1:27
6.	"Where Nothing Can Be Defined"	3:44
7.	"Splitting"	4:28
8.	"Euphoric Recal"	1:22
9.	"ASMR"	5:18
10.	"Fully Automated Luxury"	4:37
11.	"Lifetime Achievement Award"	4:27
Total length:		45:01

== Personnel ==
Adapted from AllMusic.

Cymbals

- Jack Cleverly – bass, electronic drums, guitar, piano, synthesizer, vocals
- Dan Simons – Piano, programming, synthesizer, viola

Additional Musicians

- Alabaster DePlume – saxophone
- Justin Goings – drums
- Josh Heffernan – drums
- Kristian Craig Robinson – electronic drums, programming, synthesizer bass

Technical

- Capitol K – engineer, producer
- Jorge Elbrecht – mixing
- Emily Graham – photography
- Stephen Quinns – mastering
- Matthew Walkerdine – design
