= Give Me a Reason =

Give Me a Reason may refer to:

- "Give Me a Reason" (The Corrs song), 2001
- "Give Me a Reason" (The Common Linnets song), 2014
- "Give Me a Reason" (Triple 8 song), 2003
- "Give Me a Reason", a song by Brandon Paris Band from On My Own, 2006
- "Give Me a Reason", a song by Doro Pesch from Calling the Wild, 2000
- "Give Me a Reason", a song by Frankie J. Galasso, 2009
- "Give Me a Reason", a song by Ibibio Sound Machine from Uyai, 2017
- "Give Me a Reason", a song by Jagwar Ma, 2016
- "Give Me a Reason", a song by Jeff Ament from Tone, 2008
- "Give Me a Reason", a song by Michael Bolton from Michael Bolotin, 1975
- "Give Me a Reason", a song by Third Day from Conspiracy No. 5, 1997
- "Give Me a Reason", a song by Three Days Grace from Transit of Venus, 2012
- "Give Me a Reason", a song by Hikaru Utada from First Love, 1998
- "Give Me a Reason", a song from the soundtrack of the film In Too Deep, 1999

== See also ==
- "Just Give Me a Reason", a 2013 song by Pink featuring Nate Ruess
- "Give Me One Reason", a 1996 song by Tracy Chapman
- Give Me the Reason (disambiguation)
