= Capitol K =

Brirish musician

- Genres: Folktronica, Indie-Pop, Experimental
- Instruments: Guitar, Keyboard, Electronic Effects, Laptop
- Label: Faith and Industry
- Website: Official website

Capitol K is the name under which Kristian Craig Robinson works as a musician, producer, recording engineer and label manager.

He was born in Malta and raised in Dubai, Brunei and England, and now based in London.

Capitol K first came to prominence from the single "Pillow" which peaked in the UK Singles Chart at number 99 on 9 March 2002. His early releases combined, found sound, lo-fi aside hi-fi production, electronica and Indie-pop that went someway to establishing the folktronica genre along with fellow artists, Leafcutter John, Four Tet and Tunng.

Robinson was first signed to the record label Planet Mu (1999) who released the debut album Sounds Of The Empire, and then to XL Recordings (2002) who released the album Island Row before he created the Faith and Industry label (2004) which has released recent Capitol K material as well as artists, John Johanna, Patrick Wolf, Blue House, and Super Best Friends Club.

Capitol K currently runs the recording studio Total Refreshment Studio part of the Total Refreshment Centre.

Capitol K's work as a producer and recording engineer notably includes, the Mercury award nominated The Comet Is Coming, Rozi Plain's album Friend, Ibibio Sound Machine's second album Uyai, Flamingods' Majesty, and Patrick Wolf's first album entitled Lycanthropy. Serafina Steer, Bas Jan and Bradford Cox of the bands Deerhunter and Atlas Sound.

He was a member of the Brazilian artist singer Cibelle's band. And a member of Du Blonde's band for her Welcome back to Milk tour.

The period 2009 to 2015 Capitol K played synth and bass with the Archie Bronson Outfit. He also performed on and co-produced their 2014 album Wild Crush.

in 2005 Capitol K release the album Nomad Junk, composed from field recordings made in Hong Kong city, Taipei and Tokyo.

In 2012, Capitol K released the album Andean Dub. The album combined the sounds of Peruvian huayno music and more broadly Latin American cumbia with electronic sounds.

In 2015, members of Capitol K and members of the Archie Bronson Outfit collaborated under the name Loose Meat, releasing the electronic single "Circular Motions".

In 2018, Capitol K released the album Goatherder.

On 14 November 2025, Capitol K released his milestone 10th album, Artichoke.

== Discography ==
=== Albums ===
Release date	Title	Label
1999	Sounds of the Empire	Planet Mu
2000	Island Row	Planet Mu
2002	Island Row	XL Recordings
2004	Happy Happy	Faith and Industry
2005	Nomad Junk	Faith and Industry
2008	Notes from Life on the Wire with a Wrecking Ball	Faith and Industry
2012	Andean Dub	Faith and Industry
2018	Goatherder	Faith and Industry

=== Singles/EPs ===
Release date	Title	Label
1999	Capitol K EP	Elf Cut
1999	Roadeater EP	Planet Mu
2002	Pillow	XL Recordings
2008	Libertania/Go Go Go	Faith & Industry
