= Dick Essilfie Bondzie =

Ghanaian musician (1930–2020)

Dick Essilfie Bondzie (May 1, 1930 - August 19, 2020) was a Ghanaian musician, producer and founder of Essiebons label.

== Early life ==
Bondzie was born on May 1, 1930, in Apam located in the Central Region of Ghana. He lived the first five years of this life in Apam, Central region and moved to Greater Accra following his father's transfer to the country's capital. Although he developed an interest in music at an early age, he was sent to London at age 20 to continue his schooling. After traveling to study for sometime, he returned to his country where he secured a job in 1957 until 1972.

== Career ==
His passion for music led to the establishment of a recording studio and pressing plant known as the Record Manufacturer (Ghana) Limited.

In 1959, Dick founded Ghanaian Record Label, Essiebons which produced a lot of popular highlife songs back in the days. He together with some musicians led the formation of Apagya Show Band in 1972 which lasted for less than a year due to low patronage. The year 1979 saw the Essiebons moving into the film industry. It released their first film on Ghanaian traditional music known as Roots to Fruits which featured some artistes of Essiebons. The Essiebons Record Label released their latest compilation album in 2021 in honor of Dick Essilfie Bondzie. The album featured songs by Gyedu-Blay Ambolley, C.K Mann, Ernest Honni, Ebo Taylor, Kofi Papa Yankson and Bob Roy Raindorf.
