= Give Me the Reason =

Give Me the Reason may refer to:

- Give Me the Reason (Luther Vandross album), 1986
- Give Me the Reason (Lady Saw album), 1996
- "Give Me the Reason" (song), a 1986 song by Luther Vandross

== See also ==
- Give Me a Reason (disambiguation)
- "Just Give Me a Reason", a 2013 song by Pink featuring Nate Ruess, fun.'s lead singer
- "Give Me One Reason", a 1996 song by Tracy Chapman
