= Dr. K Gyasi =

Ghanaian highlife musician

- Born: Kwame Gyasi; 1929; Ankaase
- Died: 2012 (aged 82–83) Kumasi
- Genres: Highlife
- Occupation: Musician
- Instrument: Voice

Kwame Gyasi (1929–2012) was a Ghanaian highlife musician. He originated the Sikyi highlife sub-genre which combined electric organ with the known highlife genres.

== Early life and career ==
Gyasi was born in 1929 at Ankaase in the Ashanti Region. His uncle taught him to play palmwine guitar highlife and the imported calypso music. He made his first recording two years after joining the Accra-based Appiah Adjekum’s band. The recording was made in a mobile studio in Nsawam in 1952.

In 1963, Ghana's president Kwame Nkrumah invited him to accompany him on his various visits to the Soviet Bloc and North Africa.

Gyasi later formed the Noble Kings Band with which he spent a larger portion of his career.

In 1974, he released the classic Sikyi highlife medley album on Dick Essilfie-Bondzie's Essiebons record label. The album was the first to use electronic organ in highlife. With Essibons, he went on to release albums including The Highlife Doctor, Akwaaba! and The Highlife Boss.

Gyasi, however, fell into Nkrumah's disfavour after releasing Agyimah Mansah in 1964.

Gyasi was given the title 'Dr' by his fans.

His Noble Kings band included many musicians who later broke away and formed their own successful bands. These include F. Micah, Eric Agyemang, Thomas Frimpong, Kwabena Akwaboah, Kofi Sammy and Alhaji K. Frimpong.

== Death ==
Gyasi died in 2012 at the Komfo Anokye Teaching Hospital in Kumasi.
