= Ibibio Sound Machine =

English electronic afro-funk band

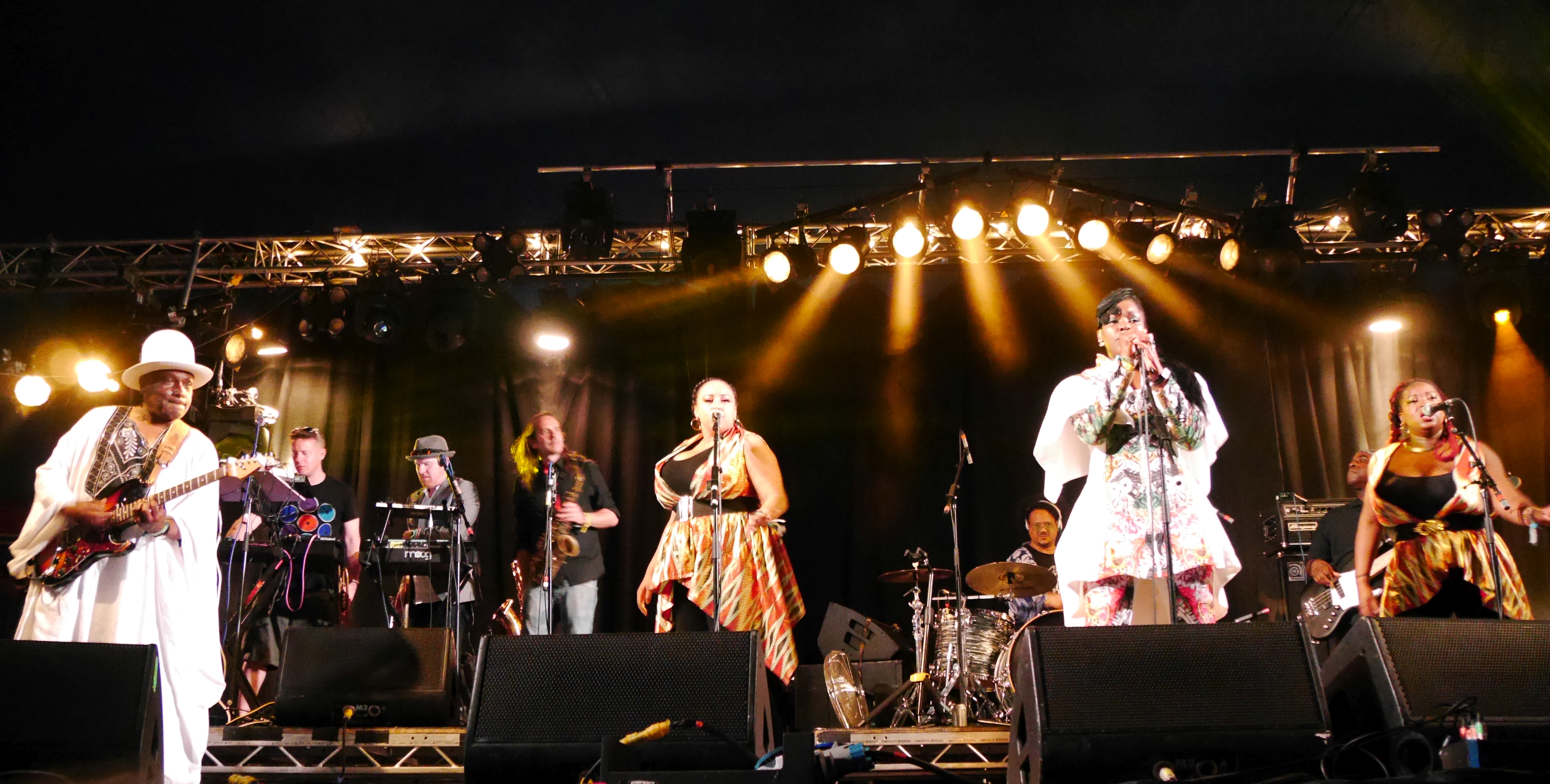
- Ibibio Sound Machine, Glastonbury Festival, 2019

Background information
- Origin: London, England
- Genres: Afrobeat; disco; electronic
- Years active: 2010s–present
- Labels: Soundway; Merge
- Members: Eno Williams; Scott Baylis; Max Grunhard; Alfred Kari Bannerman; Tony Hayden; Joseph Amoako; Philip PK Ambrose; Anselmo Netto

Ibibio Sound Machine is an English electronic afro-funk band from London. The band currently consists of vocalist Eno Williams, guitarist Alfred Kari Bannerman, percussionist Afla Sackey, drummer Joseph Amoako, bassist Philip PK Ambrose, trombonist/keyboardist Tony Hayden, trumpeter/keyboardist Scott Baylis and saxophonist/keyboardist Max Grunhard.

== History ==
The band was formed in London by producers Max Grunhard, Leon Brichard, and Benji Bouton. The trio were interested in producing music fusing elements from 1980s afrobeat and '90s drum-and-bass. They approached singer Eno Williams to create vocals for the project. After the first sessions had been successfully finished, live musicians were added to create a full band. These included the Ghanaian guitarist Alfred Bannerman from the band KonKoma and Afro-rock band Osibisa, Brazilian percussionist Anselmo Netto, and multi-instrumentalists Tony Hayden and Scott Baylis.

The band released their first single in January 2014 on Soundway, entitled Let's Dance. Their self-titled debut album followed in March the same year.

In 2016, the band signed to Merge Records to create their follow-up record. Their second album, Uyai, was released in 2017.

In 2022, they released Electricity, produced by Hot Chip. The album was received well, garnering positive reviews from outlets such as Pitchfork and The Guardian. Clash Music called the album "Bright, buoyant, and continually innovative" and Exclaim described it as "Ibibio Sound Machine manage to come across as enormously focused and imaginative while staying true to their wildly diverse, free-flowing modus operandi."

In 2024, the group released the album Pull the Rope.

== Musical style ==
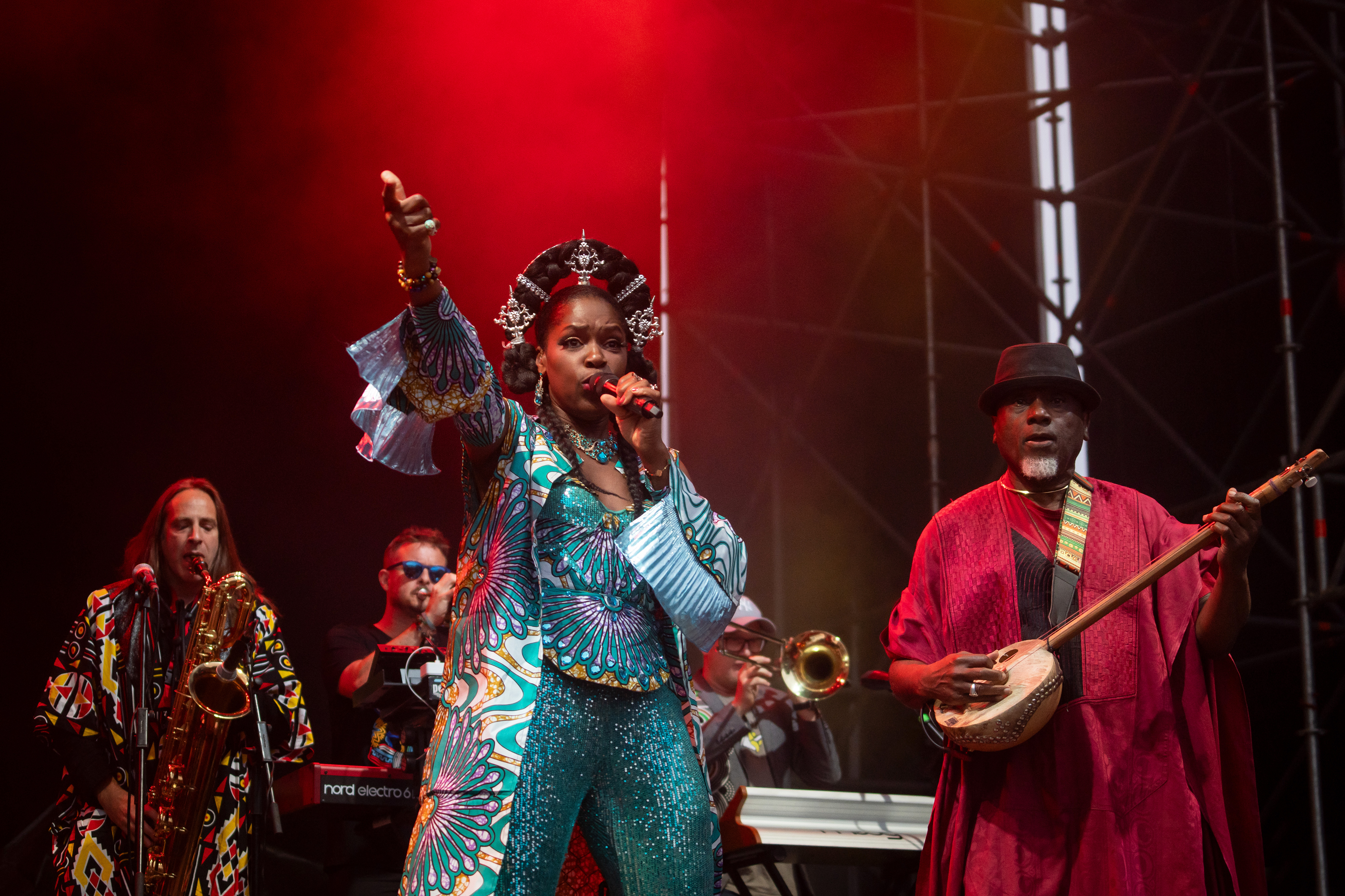
Ibibio Sound Machine in Turin, Italy.

Ibibio Sound Machine is a clash of African and electronic elements. According to the band, their sound is inspired in equal measure by the golden era of West African funk and disco, modern post-punk, and electro.

The name of the band itself finds influence from Eno Williams' mother, whose native tongue was Ibibio. While Williams was born in London, she spent most of her childhood in Nigeria with the rest of her family. Her mother often recounted numerous folk and children's stories from her heritage and passed them on to her daughter. Williams took this inspiration and crafted lyrics from these sources and married them to modern themes.

== Members ==
Current members

- Eno Williams – vocals
- Scott Baylis – trumpet, synth
- Max Grunhard – saxophone, synth
- Alfred Kari Bannerman – guitar
- Tony Hayden – trombone, synth
- Joseph Amoako – drums
- Philip PK Ambrose – bass
- Anselmo Netto – percussion

== Discography ==
=== Studio albums ===
- 2014 – Ibibio Sound Machine (Soundway Records)
- 2017 – Uyai (Merge Records)
- 2019 – Doko Mien (Merge Records)
- 2022 – Electricity (Merge Records)
- 2024 – Pull the Rope (Merge Records)
- 2026 – Chopping Mountain (Merge Records)
