= Cymbals (British band) =

- Origin: London, England
- Genres: New wave; post-punk
- Years active: 2010–present
- Labels: Tough Love Records
- Members: Jack Cleverly; Dan Simons
- Past members: Luke Carson; Neil Gillespie; Josh Heffernan

Cymbals (stylised as CYMBALS) are an English band from London. Formed in 2010, the band currently consists of vocalist/guitarist Jack Cleverly and keyboardist Dan Simons.

== History ==
The band was formed in London 2010 by Jack Cleverly (vocals/guitars), Dan Simons (keyboards), Luke Carson (bass), and Neil Gillespie (drums). The band released their debut album Unlearn a year later through the Tough Love record label, and followed up in 2012 with an EP called Sideways, Sometimes.

Their second album, entitled Age of Fracture, was released in 2014. This was followed by an EP called What Eternity, with new band member Josh Heffernan (drums). Songs from What Eternity would later be added to the bonus version of Age of Fracture. In 2017 the band entered a radical change after its releases with Carson, Gillespie and Heffernan leaving the band. Cleverly and Simons decided to continue working together as a duo and ended up releasing the band's third album, Light in Your Mind. The album was preceded by the release of the lead single, "Decay".

== Members ==
Current members

- Jack Cleverly – guitars, vocals
- Dan Simons – keyboards

Previous members

- Luke Carson – bass
- Neil Gillespie – drums
- Josh Heffernan – drums

== Discography ==
=== Studio albums ===
- Unlearn (2011, Tough Love Records)
- Age of Fracture (2014, Tough Love Records)
- Light in Your Mind (2017, Tough Love Records)

=== EPs ===
- Sideways, Sometimes (2012, Tough Love Records)
- What Eternity (2014, Tough Love Records)
