= Island Row =

Album by Capitol K

Studio album by Capitol K
- Released: 9 October 2000
- Recorded: 1999
- Genre: IDM
- Length: 53:57
- Label: Planet Mu; XL Recordings
- Producer: Capitol K, John Burton

Capitol K chronology
Sounds of the Empire (1999)	Island Row (2000)	Happy Happy (2004)

Professional ratings
Review scores
Source	Rating
AllMusic	4/5 stars
Drowned in Sound	8/10
Pitchfork	8.4/10

Island Row is the second album by IDM producer Capitol K. The record was released by Planet Mu in 2000, and re-released by XL Recordings in 2002.

"Pillow" peaked at No. 99 on the UK Singles Chart.

== Critical reception ==
Exclaim! wrote that "the music sounds so full and complex that you could lose your mind trying to figure out what all of the different noises are." The Independent called the album "the missing link between Badly Drawn Boy and Squarepusher, with the former's wistful introversion shredded into digital bricolage by the latter's cut-up techniques." The Sunday Times wrote that Capitol K "has astonishing sampling/sequencing/ programming skills, but he transforms his hours spent hunched over an Atari into music bursting with life."

== Track listing ==
1. "City" – 5:21
2. "Pillow" – 3:12
3. "Anon" – 6:07
4. "Soundwaves" – 5:26
5. "Capitol Beat Sticky" - 4:51
6. "Darussalam" – 4:31
7. "God Ohm" – 3:33
8. "Breakers" – 6:14
9. "Heat" – 5:45
10. "Monster" – 4:53
11. "Duffle Coat" – 4:01
