= Cabum =

Ghanaian highlife musician

- Born: Frank Kwame Gyasi- Frimpong; 15 June 1985 (age 40); Accra, Ghana
- Genres: Hip hop, rap
- Occupations: Singer-songwriter; performer; Rapper
- Years active: 2000–present
- Labels: OM / ChedeshiState

Cabum, born Frank Kwame Gyasi-Frimpong on 15 June 1985, to Ghanaian highlife musician Alhaji Kwame Frimpong (popularly known as Alhaji K. Frimpong) and Joyce Asabia Frimpong, is a Ghanaian rapper from Kumasi.

== Career ==
After two years of work, he got signed to Rock Entertainment and worked with a few managers including Andy Kem and Yaw Sarpong-Kumankuma. He has since released his first studio album "The Beginning". His slogan or emblem which literally means "Cherish it" normally precedes or ends all his records. He uses that slogan to usher his listeners into his music to cherish his lyrics. Cabum has since shared the stage with Angelique Kidjo and Youssou Ndour at the Mo Ibrahim Freedom Concert.

== Nominations ==
=== Ghana Music Awards ===
Year	Nominee / work	Award	Result
2016	Aka Blay ft Cabum	Highlife Song of the Year	Nominated
2017	Okyeame Kwame ft. Cabum, Medikal, Sister Derby,	HIP-HOP SONG OF THE YEAR.	Nominated

== Discography ==
=== Studio albums ===
- The Beginning

=== Singles ===
- "Dodoodo"
- "Atingya"
- "Style Bea be"
- "Devile in my temple"
- "To be a man"
