= The Original Sound of Cumbia =

Compilation album by Various artists
- Released: 5 December 2011
- Genres: cumbia; porro
- Length: 161:57
- Label: Soundway

The Original Sound of Cumbia (subtitled The History of Colombian Cumbia & Porro as Told by the Phonograph 1948–79) is a compilation album of Colombian cumbia and porro that was compiled by Will Holland and released by Soundway Records on 5 December 2011.

== Background and release ==
Cumbia and porro are genres of music and dance from the Colombian Caribbean. Cumbia originated in the department of Magdalena around the confluence of the Cauca and Magdalena Rivers. It is popular across Latin America and has also influenced music in the United States and Europe. Porro is a related genre that has its roots in the music of late 19th century wind bands in the departments of Bolívar and Córdoba. Both genres were originally played on instruments from African, European, and indigenous Colombian musical traditions.

In the 1930s–50s music from Colombia's Caribbean coast underwent a transition in style and sound, as bandleaders like Pacho Galán and Lucho Bermúdez played and composed traditional music with large orchestras modelled on big band and mambo groups. Cumbia and porro became popular in the interior of Colombia, and cumbia in particular started to be seen by Colombians as the national music style, which had up to that point been bambuco. In the 1960s cumbia orchestras shrunk in size, and bands like los Corraleros de Majagual introduced new instruments and brought the genre greater international popularity.

British musician and producer Will Holland selected the tracks that appear on The Original Sound of Cumbia from singles and LPs that he collected during a five-year stay in Colombia. The album was released by Soundway Records on 5 December 2011.

== Critical reception ==
Professional ratings
Review scores
Source	Rating
AllMusic	4.5/5 stars
Christgau's Consumer Guide	A−
The Irish Times	5/5 stars
The Observer	4/5 stars
Record Collector	3/5 stars
Songlines	4/5 stars
The Telegraph	4/5 stars

David Katz, in a review for BBC Music, called the album "a must for even the most seasoned cumbia hound." Nigel Wood of the Irish Times wrote that "the Soundway label is a byword for quality World archive collections, and this is a gem." In a review for AllMusic, Thom Jurek wrote that "the music found in this collection sounds as radical and vital in the 21st century as it did during the period documented here." Music journalist Robert Christgau wrote in his A− review that "there's not much of the surface sparkle of the Disco Fuentes [sic] cumbia comps here, but boy, are these guys determined to stand out and have fun."

Several reviews praised the liner notes of the album, written by Holland, which Songlines described as "passionately lengthy".

== Track listing ==
Part 1: "Original Colombian 78s" track listing
No.	Title	Artist	Length
1.	"La Cumbia Está Llamando"	Gastón (El Isleño) con El Conjunto de Jaime Simanca	2:56
2.	"Cumbia del Puerto"	Conjunto Los Rumberos	2:43
3.	"Judith"	Lucho Pérez	2:36
4.	"Sembrando Café"	Alberto Pacheco y su Conjunto	2:49
5.	"Nubia en la Playa"	Rafael Yepes Crespo con sus Negros de la Región	2:49
6.	"Capital Cebuista"	Santander Flores	2:57
7.	"El Pájaro Prieto"	Rufo Garrido y su Conjunto	2:47
8.	"La Fullera"	Conjunto Ritmos del Caribe	2:51
9.	"San Jacinto"	Aníbal Velásquez y su Conjunto	2:59
10.	"Montería"	Orquesta Ritmos de Sabanas	2:50
11.	"Amor del Magdalena"	Baldomero Urieles con Efraín Burgos y su Conjunto	2:46
12.	"Samaria"	Los Alegres del Valle	2:56
13.	"Cumbia Fonsequera"	Conjunto Martínez	3:07
14.	"Canto a Betty"	Silvio Guzman y Conjunto José M. Peñaranda	2:10
15.	"La Vaca y el Caporal"	Pedro Salcedo y su Orquesta	2:54
16.	"Cumbia Bucanera"	Los Alegres Bucaneros	3:13
17.	"Fabiola"	Gildardo Montoya y Conjunto Los Rumberos	2:56
18.	"Cumbia de Todos"	Guillermo Muñoz y Conjunto Típico del Magdalena	2:33
19.	"Me Quedo Con el Viejo"	Crescencio Salcedo	2:41
20.	"Flores de Colombia"	Lalito y Conjunto Colombia	2:43
21.	"Dulce Lamento"	Nacho Paredes con Los Vaqueros Sabaneros	2:55
22.	"La Margarita"	Los Ases del Ritmo	2:31
23.	"Los Cumbiamberos"	Emiro Caicedo y su Combo	2:23
24.	"Cumbia del Magdalena"	Hugo Racedo y su Conjunto	2:48
25.	"Cumbia Sobre el Mar"	Trío Serenata	2:53
26.	"Sangre Goajira"	Los Indígenas	2:31
27.	"La Muerte"	Toño Fernández	2:49
28.	"Cumbia del Mar"	Los Hermanitos Ferreyra	3:18
29.	"Cumbia Alegre" (Vinyl-only bonus track)	Angel Martínez con los Sabaneros	2:53

Part 2: "Original 45s and LP Cuts" track listing
No.	Title	Artist	Length
1.	"Cumbia del Carnival"	Betopey	2:28
2.	"Reina de Cumbias"	Conjunto Miramar	3:03
3.	"La Millera"	Los Cumbiamberos de Chorrera	2:33
4.	"Rosa y Mayo"	Andrés Landero	2:49
5.	"La Culebra"	Los Tigres con Morgan Blanco	2:55
6.	"Tambo, Tambo"	La Cumbia Soledeña	3:08
7.	"Cumbia Negra"	Jaime Simanca y sus Fandangueros	3:16
8.	"Cumbia Candela"	Aniceto Molina y su Conjunto	3:15
9.	"Descarga en Cumbia"	Banda Bajera de San Pelayo	2:48
10.	"Guayabita Colora"	Alberto Pacheco	2:34
11.	"La Cachona"	Banda 11 de Enero de Murillo	2:43
12.	"Rastrillando"	Lucho Campillo y su Conjunto	2:59
13.	"El 4 y 5"	Carlos Román	3:49
14.	"Tracionera"	Banda 2da de Laguneta Cordoba	3:41
15.	"Cumbia de la Monta̱a"	Satanás y su Grupo	2:41
16.	"La Guacharaca"	Toño Fernández	2:41
17.	"La Gaita del Pato"	Lucho Yépes	2:41
18.	"El Porro es Hermano de la Cumbia"	El Pholy Combo	3:20
19.	"A Baranoa"	Grupo Costa Brava	3:45
20.	"Playas Embrujadas"	Elías Morón y su Conjunto Vallenato	2:48
21.	"Cumbia Colombia"	Chico Cervantes	2:35
22.	"Cumbia Bogotana"	Aníbal Velásquez y su Conjunto	2:47
23.	"Pescadores del Mar"	Alfonso Puerta y su Conjunto	2:31
24.	"Elionora"	Miguel Durán	3:21
25.	"El Secuestro"	Celia Estremor y su Grupo de Baile Cantao	2:59
26.	"Lluvia"	Hermanos Tuirán	2:23
27.	"El Niño Llora"	unknown	1:46
28.	"Cumbia Linda" (Vinyl-only bonus track)	Heber Macías	2:21
Total length:			161:57
