= Doing It In Lagos: Boogie, Pop & Disco in 1980s Nigeria =

Compilation album by Various Artists
- Released: December 9, 2016
- Genre: Pop, disco, afropop
- Length: 116:07
- Label: Soundway Records

Professional ratings
Review scores
Source	Rating
Allmusic	4.5/5 stars
Pitchfork	(8.5/10)

Doing It In Lagos: Boogie, Pop & Disco in 1980s Lagos is a compilation album released in 2016 by Soundway Records. It collects Nigerian pop and club culture tracks released in the late 1970s through the 1980s. Though afrobeat, led by artists like Fela Kuti, dominated Nigerian music during the 1970s, Doing It In Lagos chronicles Nigerian music's move away from the afrocentric style of afrobeat and toward more American forms of pop music in the 1980s. Many of the tracks are rare and, prior to this album's release, were sold for high prices in online auctions.

== Track listing ==
Disc 1
No.	Title	Artist	Length
1.	"Fella's Doing It In Lagos"	Hotline	5:34
2.	"Don't You Know"	Peter Abdul	3:43
3.	"Only You"	Steve Monite	6:19
4.	"Enjoy Your Life"	Oby Onyioha	6:14
5.	"Ivory"	Kio Amachree	5:08
6.	"Holiday Action"	Livy Ekemezie	5:10
7.	"Don't Give Up"	Willy Roy	6:35
8.	"Funk With Me"	Danny Offia	5:20
9.	"Too Hot"	Rick Asik	5:14
10.	"Distant Lover"	Terry Mackson	5:32

Disc 2
No.	Title	Artist	Length
1.	"Burning Jungle"	Ofege	3:21
2.	"Identify With Your Root"	Odion Iruoje	6:45
3.	"Shake Your Body"	Mike Umoh	6:14
4.	"Where Is The Answer"	Burnis Moleme	6:58
5.	"Don't Stop That Music"	Sony Enang	5:11
6.	"Groove I Like"	Veno	3:36
7.	"Let's Do More Music"	Godfrey Odili	7:37
8.	"Ore Mi"	Toby Foreh	5:42
9.	"Colourful Environment"	Gboyega Adelaja	5:19
10.	"On The Air"	Lexy Mella	5:30
11.	"Be My Lady (Mix)"	Nkono Teles	4:26
