= Uyai =

Studio album by Ibibio Sound Machine
- Released: March 3, 2017
- Studios: Fish Market Studios; (London, England); Vanguard Studios; (London, England)
- Genres: Afrobeat; disco; electronic
- Length: 47:14
- Label: Merge Records
- Producer: Max Grunhard

Ibibio Sound Machine chronology
Ibibio Sound Machine (2014)	Uyai (2017)	Doko Mien (2019)

Singles from Uyai
- 1. "Give Me a Reason" Released: May 8, 2017

Uyai is the second studio album by Ibibio Sound Machine, released on March 3, 2017. It is the first album released by Merge Records since joining the label in 2016.

== Reception ==
Professional ratings
Aggregate scores
Source	Rating
Metacritic	84/100
Review scores
Source	Rating
AllMusic	3.5/5 stars

Uyai was well-received by contemporary music critics upon its initial release. At Metacritic, which assigns a normalized rating out of 100 to reviews from mainstream publications, the album received an average score of 84, based on 12 reviews, indicating "universal acclaim".

Reviewing the album for AllMusic, critic Paul Thompson wrote that "With this release, the eight-member group continues its blend of West African rhythms, disco, funk, and electro, adding a bit more post-punk and new wave this time around. Dynamic frontwoman Eno Williams is still the star of the show, and while many of her lyrics (sung in Ibibio and English) are still based on Nigerian folktales, this album is more socially conscious, reflecting on recent events and the general state of the world."

== Track listing ==
All tracks are written by Ibibio Sound Machine.

Uyai
No.	Title	Length
1.	"Give Me a Reason"	4:17
2.	"The Chant (Iquo Isang)"	4:29
3.	"One That Lights Up (Andi Domo Ikang Uwem Mi)"	3:37
4.	"The Pot Is on Fire"	4:20
5.	"Quiet"	3:54
6.	"Joy (Idaresit)"	3:43
7.	"Power of 3"	4:21
8.	"Lullaby"	4:05
9.	"Guide You (Edu Kpeme)"	3:13
10.	"Sunray (Eyio)"	4:27
11.	"Cry (Eyed)"	2:10
12.	"Trance Dance"	4:38
Total length:		47:14

== Personnel ==
Adapted from the album's Bandcamp page

- Eno Williams – Vocals
- Alfred Kari Bannerman – Guitar
- Anselmo Netto – Percussion
- Jose Joyette – Drums
- John McKenzie – Bass
- Tony Hayden – Trombone, Synthesizer, Additional Production
- Scott Baylis – Trumpet, Synthesizer
- Max Grunhard – Alto & Baritone Saxophone, Synthesizer, Production, Engineer on all tracks except 'Trance Dance', Mixing

Additional musicians

- Derrick McIntyre – Bass on ‘Give Me a Reason’
- CH Straatman – Bass on ‘Quiet’
- Emmanuel Rentzos – Keyboard on ‘Guide You’ and ‘Pot Is On Fire’
- Dan Leavers – Additional Production, Mixing, Additional Keyboard on ‘Give Me a Reason’, ‘Pot Is On Fire’ and ‘Joy’
- Kristian Craig Robinson– Additional Production, Mixing, Mbira, Flute and Synthesizer on ‘One That Lights Up’
- Affiong David Ekwere – Backing Vocals and Spoken Part on ‘The Chant’, Backing Vocals on ‘Guide You’
- Marilyn David Huck – Backing Vocals on ‘The Chant’ and ‘Guide You’
- Jaelee Small – Backing Vocals on ‘The Chant’ and ‘Pot Is On Fire’
- Beth Mburu-Bowie – Backing Vocals on ‘The Chant’ and ‘Pot Is On Fire’

Additional technical

- Benedic Lamdin – Engineer on 'Trance Dance'
- Guy Davie – Mastering
- Vanessa DeJongh – Design
- Daniel Murphy – Design
- Dan Wilton – photography
