= Gyedu-Blay Ambolley =

Ghanaian musical artist

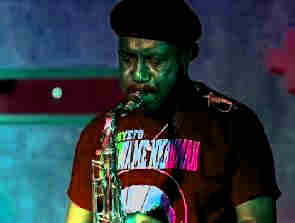

Background information
- Born: 1947 (age 78–79)
- Origin: Sekondi-Takoradi, Ghana; Los Angeles, United States
- Genres: Highlife; Afrobeat; Afropop; jazz
- Occupations: Saxophonist; bass guitarist; guitarist; composer; percussionist; singer; band leader; arranger; record producer
- Years active: Early 1970s–present
- Labels: Essiebons Records; Wea International; Dix Records; Simigwa

Gyedu-Blay Ambolley is a Ghanaian highlife musician, songwriter, producer, and composer. The first musician from Ghana and the world to formally incorporate rap forms into local highlife rhythms, Ambolley created the musical genre Simigwa.

== Career ==
Gyedu-Blay Ambolley was rather unknown outside of West Africa until Soundway Records included his seminal Simigwa-Do, which Ambolley released in 1973, on their first anthology, Ghana Soundz. Ambolley's sound has led many to label him the godfather of hiplife, the fusion of hip hop and highlife idioms. Ambolley stood aside AL Threats at the Playboy Jazz Festival in Los Angeles. His song "Simigua-do" is considered the first Ghanaian version of previously introduced American rap in the world released in 1973. Ambolley, Sammy Lartey and Ebo Taylor are the few musicians who envisioned a future for high-life music in the late 60s and early 70s and helped transform the genre fusing high-life, funk and jazz music.

== Achievements ==
In June 2015 Ambolley received a citation in the US from the City Council of Philadelphia, read by Councilwoman Honorable Jannie Blackwell and Hon. Stanley J. Staughter in recognition of the musician's contributions to Ghanaian music in the US.

== Awards ==
- Most Consistent Artist — Ghana (1980)
- Album and Song of the Year — Ghana (1990)
- Trend Music Awards — Ivory Coast (1997)
- Africa-American History Award — MWEPC, Los Angeles, CA (2001)
- Afrikan Music Award — Los Angeles, CA (2002)
- Malcolm X Music Festival Award — Los Angeles, CA (2002)
- Lifetime Achievement Award — The Jazz at Drew from Charles R. Drew University of Medicine and Science, Los Angeles, CA (2003)
- Congressional, Gubernatorial Certificate of Special Recognition — Congresswoman Juanita Millinder McDonald (2003)
- Best World Beat Recombinant Artist 2003 & Best World Beat Recombinant Artist 2003 L.A. Weekly nominated Ambolley for Best World Beat Recombinant Artist in 2003 and 2004
