= KonKoma =

London-based Afro-funk band

KonKoma are a London-based Afro-funk band signed to Soundway Records. The band fuse Afro-funk and Afrobeat with the influences of American blaxploitation-era soul and 1960s psychedelia.

== Members ==
Featured among KonKoma’s members are Ghanaian musicians Alfred "Kari" Bannerman and Emmanuel Rentzos, both of whom have shared the stage with artists Peter Green (founding member of Fleetwood Mac) and Hugh Masekela, as well as both having been long-standing members of the Afro-rock group Osibisa.

=== List of members ===
- Emmanuel Rentzos (vocals, keyboards)
- Reginald "JoJo" Yates (vocals, mbira, sepriwa, percussion)
- Alfred "Kari" Bannerman (guitar, vocals)
- Nii Tagoe (vocals, percussion)
- Jose Joyette (drums)
- Derrick McIntyre (bass guitar)
- Scott Baylis (trumpet)
- Max Grunhard (alto & baritone saxophone)
- Ben Hadwen (baritone saxophone, flute)

== Releases ==
KonKoma's self-titled debut LP was produced in 2012 by Max Grunhard and Benedic Lamdin (Nostalgia 77) and recorded and mixed by Mike Pelanconi (a.k.a. Prince Fatty) in Brighton.
