= Soundway Records =

British independent record label

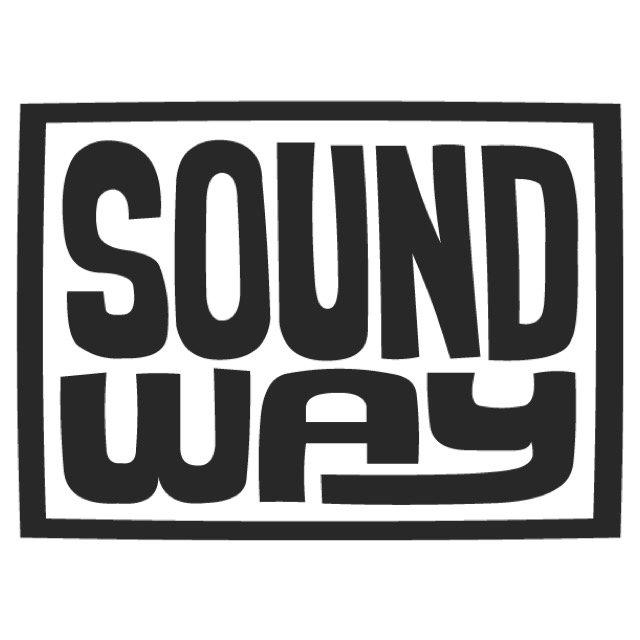
- Founded: 2002
- Founder: Miles Cleret
- Genre: African, Caribbean, Latin, and Asian music
- Country of origin: United Kingdom
- Location: London
- Official website: soundwayrecords.com

Soundway Records is a British, London-based independent record label, founded and run by English DJ and music producer Miles Cleret. Since its initial release of a collection of Ghanaian music in 2002, it has released compilation albums of African, Caribbean, Latin, and Asian music from the 1950s to 1980s.

== History ==
The label started in 2002 with the release of Ghana Soundz: Afrobeat, Funk & Fusion in '70s Ghana. Composed of Ghanaian music from the 1970s, the release was compiled from a hoard of dusty LPs and 45s that Cleret discovered whilst on a search mission to Ghana. With immediate critical acclaim from Joe Tangari, writer for Pitchfork Media and creator of Africa 100, Cleret was encouraged to set off again on a number of expeditions around the world.

As a result, the label has released a series of critically acclaimed compilation albums and re-issues of African, Caribbean, Latin, and Asian music from the 1950s to 1980s. These include the Nigeria Special, Ghana Special, and Kenya Special compilation albums, as well as Doing It In Lagos: Boogie, Pop & Disco in 1980s Nigeria, and a retrospective from Ghanaian disco legend Kiki Gyan.

Highlife on the Move (2015) features one of the earliest recordings of Afrobeat founder Fela Kuti. Fela recorded the song "Fela's Special" in London in 1960 for the Melodisc label with his band Fela Ransome-Kuti & the Highlife Rakers. In the sleeve notes, Markus Coester adds that "Even though [the recordings] had been discographically tracked and people interested in Fela's musical life knew of them, they kept hiding for more than 50 years. Before I came across them, I was even in doubt whether they had been released at all. These are amazing first recordings, however".

Since 2012, the label has issued a series of original contemporary releases as well as re-issued older music. These include releases from acts such as Batida, Ibibio Sound Machine, Debruit & Alsarah, Fantasma, Fumaça Preta, Ondatropica, The Meridian Brothers, Los Miticos Del Ritmo, Chico Mann, Bomba Estereo, My Panda Shall Fly, KonKoma, Family Atlantica, and Dexter Story.

The Guardian included Soundway Records on its list of the "10 British recording labels defining the sound of 2014".

In January 2017, Soundway Records was awarded 'Label of The Year' by Gilles Peterson's Worldwide Awards held at Koko London.

== Notable releases ==
- Ghana Special: Modern Highlife, Afro-Sounds & Ghanaian Blues 1968–1981 (2009)
- The Original Sound of Cumbia (2011)
- Doing It In Lagos: Boogie, Pop & Disco in 1980s Nigeria (2016)
- Ghana Special 2: Electronic Highlife & Afro Sounds In The Diaspora, 1980–93 (2024)
