= Pat Thomas (Ghanaian musician) =

Ghanaian vocalist and songwriter (born 1946)

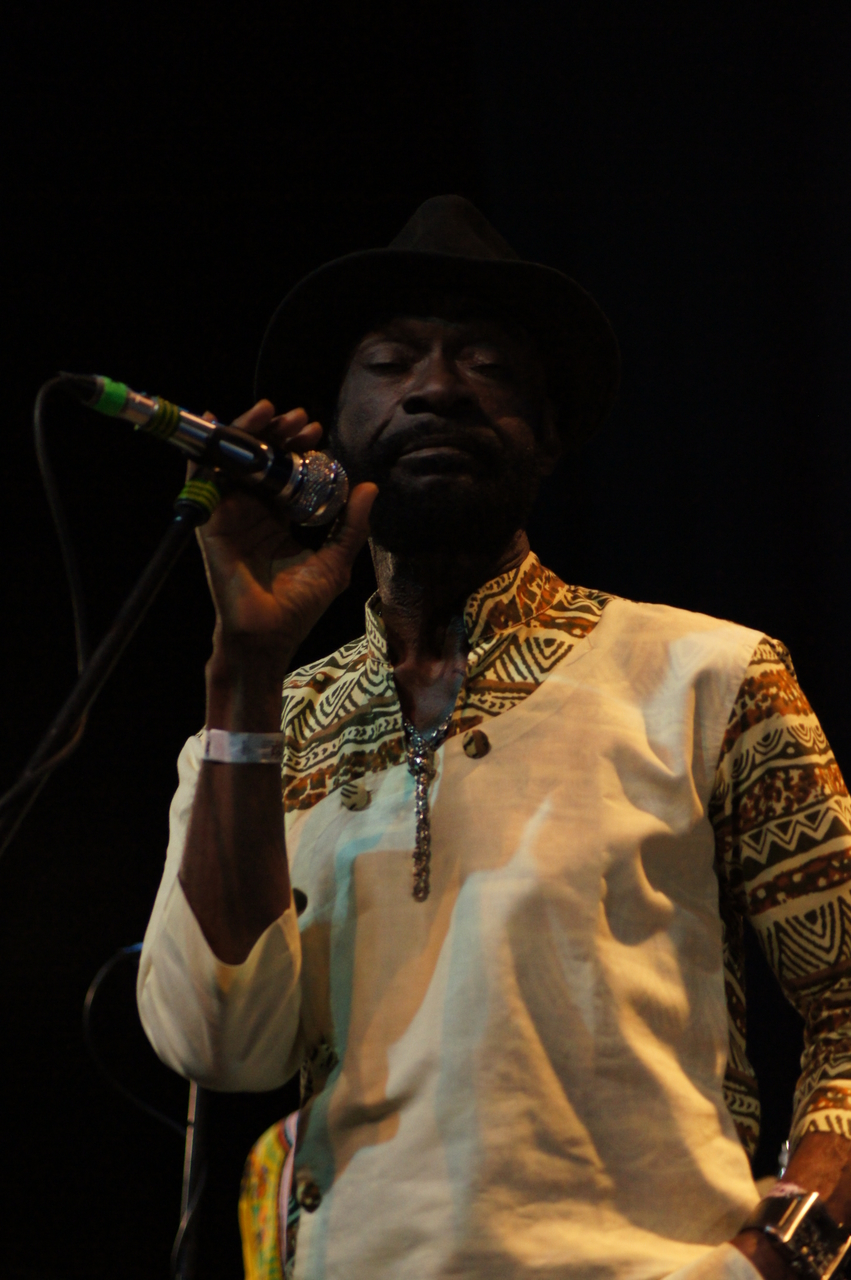
- Pat Thomas, performing live in May 2016 in Ljubljana, Slovenia

Background information
- Also known as: Paa Thomas, Nana Amoo-Mensah I
- Born: Nana Kwabena Amo Mensah; August 14, 1946 (age 80); Agona, Gold Coast
- Genre: Highlife
- Member of: Pat Thomas and Kwashibu Area Band

Pat Thomas (born Nana Kwabena Amo Mensah; August 14, 1946) is a Ghanaian vocalist and songwriter. He is widely known for his work in highlife bands of Ebo Taylor.

== Early life and education ==
Pat Thomas was born in Asante Agona in the Ashanti Region. His father was a music theory instructor and his mother a bandleader.

== Career ==
He started his musical career in the 1960s when he collaborated with Ebo Taylor. In 1974, he formed the band "Sweet Beans" and with them, he recorded his first album False lover. He recorded his second album "Pat Thomas Introduces Marijata" with the band Marijata. After the coup in Ghana in 1979, he relocated to Berlin and later settled in Canada. He is now touring worldwide with his Kwashibu Area Band. In June 2015 they released the album Pat Thomas and Kwashibu Area Band to mark 50 years of his musical career. Thomas is known as "The Golden Voice Of Africa". Thomas sings in Fante Language.

== Awards ==
In the year 2015, the Pat Thomas and Kwashibu Area Band self-titled album was listed by AllMusic as one of the "Favorite Latin and World Albums".

== Albums ==
- 1992 - Santrofi (Nakasi Records).
- 2015 – Pat Thomas & Kwashibu Area Band – Pat Thomas & Kwashibu Area Band (CD / 12") K7 Music
- 2016 – Pat Thomas – Coming home (CD) K7 Music
- 2019 – Pat Thomas & Kwashibu area band – Obiaa! (CD / 12") K7 Music
- 2019 – Pat Thomas & Kwashibu Are Band – Yamona (Dam Swindle remix) (CD) K7 Music
