= K. Frimpong =

Ghanaian highlife musician

Alhaji Mohammed Ibrahim Kwame Frimpong
- Born: 22 July 1939; Ofoase, Ashanti Region, Gold Coast
- Died: 18 October 2005 (aged 66); Kumasi, Ghana
- Children: Cabum and Kofi Kapone

Alhaji Mohammed Ibrahim Kwame Frimpong (22 July 1939 – 18 October 2005), known as K. Frimpong, was a Ghanaian highlife singer. He is known for his hit song "Kyenkyen Bi Adi M'awu", performed by K. Frimpong And His Cubano Fiestas.

He was born in Ofoase, Ashanti Region, Gold Coast (later Ghana). In the 1970s, he recorded with two different bands, with overlapping personnel. One was the Vis-A-Vis band, based in Kumasi and led by Isaac Yeboah. Their album Obi Agye Me Dofo was released in Ghana on the Probisco record label, and was later reissued on the Makossa International label. The second band was the Cubano Fiestas, who recorded the album K. Frimpong and His Cubano Fiestas in 1977 for the Ofori Brothers label. The album contained the track "Kyenkyen Bi Adi M'awu" for which Frimpong is best known. He recorded at least two other albums with the Cubano Fiestas: Me Da A Onnda (1980), and K Frimpong, both released in Ghana on the Polydor label.

Frimpong died on 18 October 2005 in Komfo Anokye Teaching Hospital, Kumasi, Ghana.

His two sons are rappers named Cabum and Kofi Kapone.

== Discography ==
- Kyenkyen Bi Adi M'awu (1976)
- Okwantuni (1995)
