= Ebo Taylor =

Ghanaian musician and producer (1936–2026)

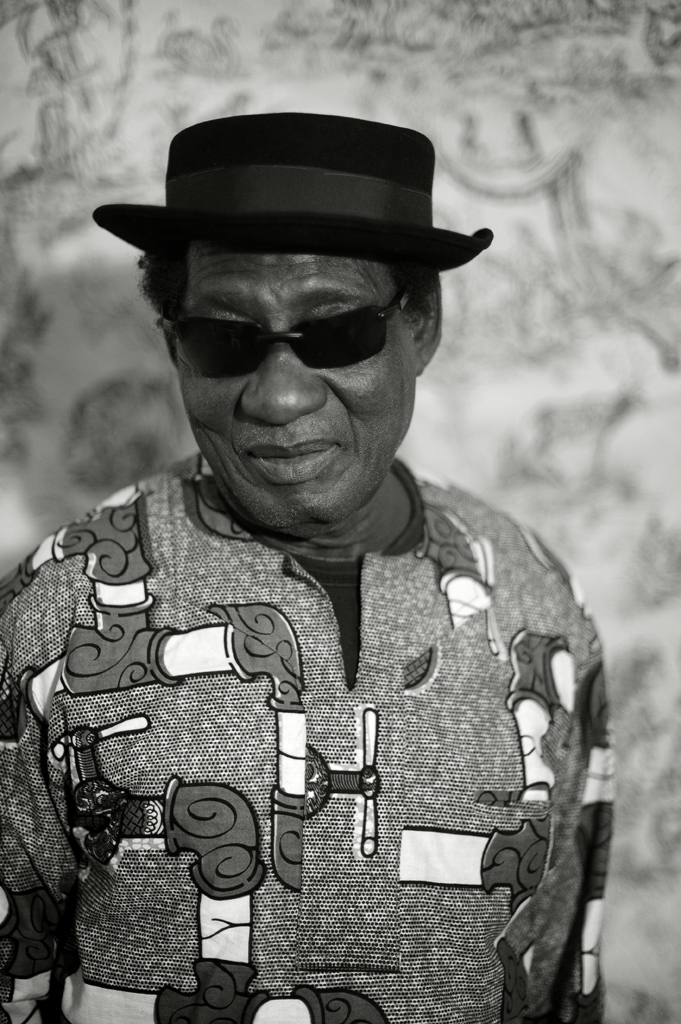
- Taylor in 2013

Background information
- Born: Deroy Taylor; 6 January 1936; Cape Coast, Gold Coast
- Origin: Accra, Ghana
- Died: 7 February 2026 (aged 90) Saltpond, Ghana
- Genres: Highlife; afrobeat; jazz
- Occupations: Guitarist; singer; composer; bandleader; record producer
- Years active: Late 1950s–2026
- Labels: Essiebons; Gapophone; Philips-West African-Records; Strut Records

Ebo Taylor (born Deroy Taylor; 6 January 1936 – 7 February 2026) was a Ghanaian guitarist, composer, bandleader, record producer and arranger focusing on highlife and afrobeat music.

== Life and career ==
Born Deroy Taylor in Cape Coast, in what was then the Gold Coast colony, on 6 January 1936, he started playing piano at the age of six.

Taylor was a pivotal figure in the Ghanaian music scene for over six decades. In the late 1950s, he was active in the influential highlife bands the Stargazers and the Broadway Dance Band. In 1962, Taylor took his group, the Black Star Highlife Band, to London where he collaborated with Nigerian afrobeat pioneer Fela Kuti as well as other African musicians.

Returning to Ghana, Taylor worked as a producer for musicians such as Pat Thomas and C. K. Mann—as well as pursued solo projects—combining traditional Ghanaian material with afrobeat, jazz, and funk rhythms to create his own recognizable sound in the 1970s. He was the inhouse guitar player, arranger, and producer for Essiebons, founded by Dick Essilfie Bondzie.

In 1992, Ghetto Concept included his afrobeats in their music.

Taylor's work became popular internationally with hip-hop producers in the 21st century. In 2008, Taylor met the Berlin-based musicians of the Afrobeat Academy band, including saxophonist Ben Abarbanel-Wolff, which led to the release of the album Love and Death with Strut Records (his first internationally distributed album) in 2010. The same year, Usher used a sample from Taylor's song "Heaven" for "She Don't Know" with Ludacris. His songs were also sampled by artists including the Black Eyed Peas, Kelly Rowland, Jidenna, Vic Mensa and Rapsody.

He collaborated again with the Afrobeat Academy in Berlin in 2011. In 2017, his Ghanaian funk anthem "Come Along" was popular among DJs.

The success of Love and Death prompted Strut to issue the retrospective Life Stories: Highlife & Afrobeat Classics 1973–1980, in the spring of 2011. A year later, in 2012, a third Strut album, Appia Kwa Bridge, was released. Appia Kwa Bridge showed that at 77 years old, Taylor remained creative, mixing traditional Fante songs and chants with children's rhymes and personal stories into his own sharp vision of highlife.

He performed at the 2015 edition of the annual Stanbic Jazz Festival along with Earl Klugh, Ackah Blay and others.

In 2025, at the age of 89, Taylor received renewed attention in the United States through the label Jazz Is Dead after decades as an often unheralded force in West African music, according to a New York Times article by David Peisner.

== Death ==
Ebo Taylor died on February 7, 2026, in Saltpond, a town on the coast of Ghana. A delegation from the Musicians Union of Ghana (MUSIGA), led by its president, Bessa Simons, paid a condolence visit to his family in Saltpond.

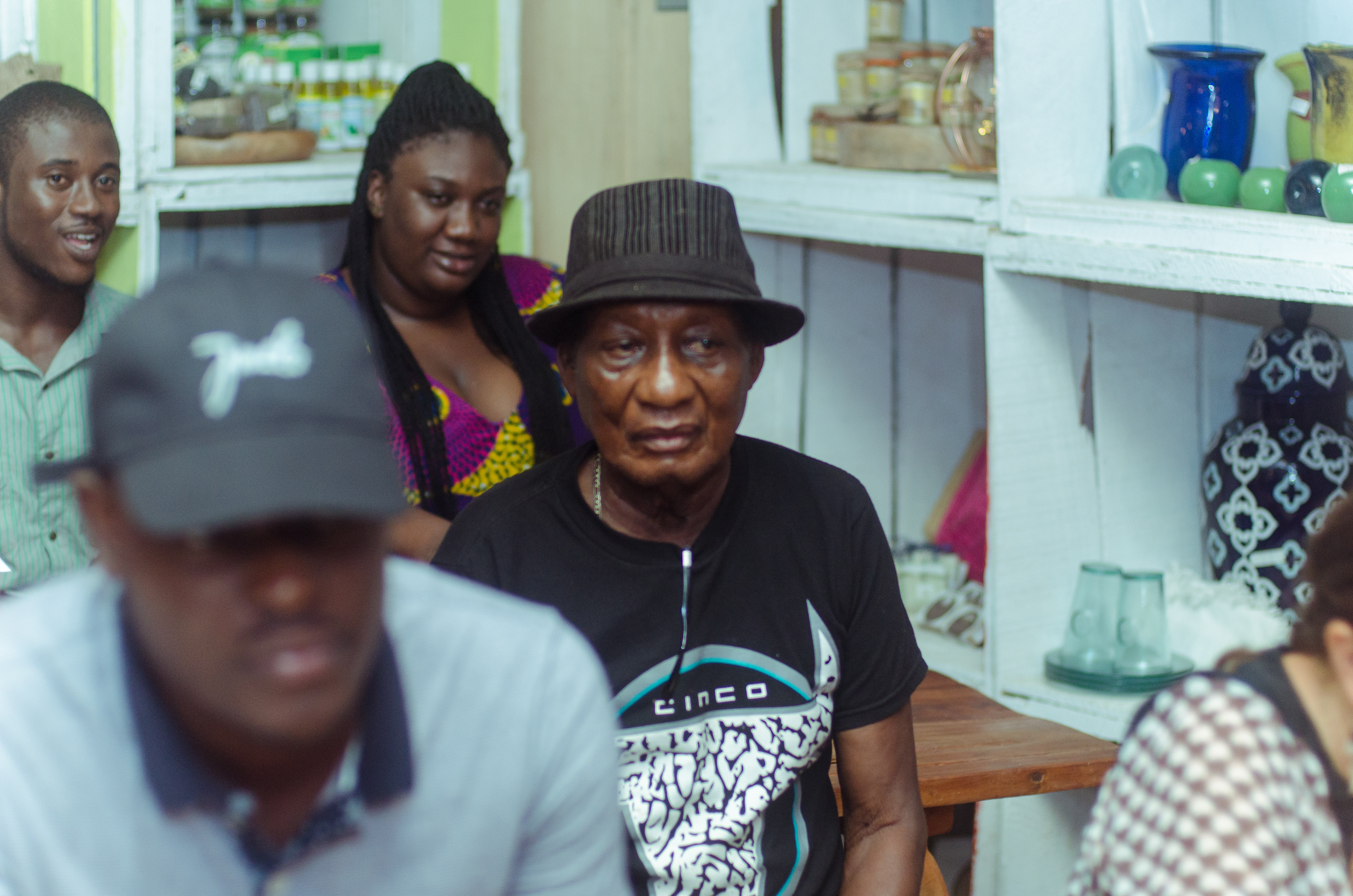
Taylor watching a musical performance by young Ghanaian artists

== Awards and recognition ==
- Life Time Achievement Award – 2014 Vodafone Ghana Music Awards
- Lifetime Achievement Award – 2019 Highlife Music Awards
- Music Legend of the year – 2019 Ghana Business Awards

== Selected discography ==
=== Albums ===
- My Love and Music (LP) (Gapophone Records), 1976
- Ebo Taylor (Essiebons), 1977
- Twer Nyame (Philips-West African-Records), 1978
- Me Kra Tsie - Ebo Taylor & Saltpond Barkers Choir (LP) (Essiebons), 1979
- Conflict - Ebo Taylor & Uhuru Yenzu (Essiebons), 1980
- Calypso "Mahuno" and High Lifes Celebration - Pat Thomas & Ebo Taylor (Pan African Records), 1980
- Hitsville Re-Visited - Ebo Taylor, Pat Thomas & Uhuru Yenzu (LP) (Essiebons), 1982
- Abenkwan Puchaa - Ebo Taylor & Bonze Konkoma (Essiebons), 2009
- Love and Death (Strut Records), 2010
- Life Stories: Best of Ebo Taylor 1973–80 (Strut Records), 2012
- Appia Kwa Bridge (Strut Records), 2012
- Yen Ara (Mr. Bongo), 2018
- Palaver (Tabansi/BBE Music), 2019 (rec. 1980)
- Ebo Taylor JID022 - Ebo Taylor, Adrian Younge & Shaheed Muhammad (Jazz Is Dead), 2025

As contributing artist

- The Rough Guide to Psychedelic Africa (World Music Network) 2012
