= Leonor Buenaventura de Valencia =

Colombian songwriter, poet, singer, and teacher

- Born: Leonor Buenaventura Torres; 10 May 1914; Ibagué, Colombia
- Died: 2 June 2007 (aged 93) Ibagué, Colombia

Leonor Buenaventura de Valencia (1914–2007) was a Colombian songwriter, poet, singer, and teacher. She led several choirs, and her compositions "La Ibaguereña" and "Ibagué" are anthems of the city of Ibagué.

== Biography ==
=== Early life and education ===
Buenaventura was born on 10 May 1914 in Ibagué, capital of the Colombian department of Tolima. Her father Juan Nepomuceno Buenaventura was a poet and historian, and wrote the lyrics to his daughter's first composition, the pasillo "Morir Soñando". Her mother María Esther Torres died of typhoid in 1931, and around the same time her father lost most of his money.

As a child Buenaventura studied music at the Tolima Conservatory. She went to high school in Bogotá, and then returned to Ibagué to help care for her younger siblings.

=== Life in Ibagué ===
In Ibagué, Buenaventura taught piano and singing. In 1938 she took over leadership of the children's choir El Muñequero, which had been founded by Josefina Acosta de Varón. She led the choir for 10 years before it disbanded. Buenaventura continued studying music at the Tolima Conservatory, and in the mid-1940s she obtained a degree in music under the teacher Demetrio Haralambis.

Buenaventura had studied composition, and by the 1950s she was well-known as a songwriter in Colombia. In 1949 she was appointed tenor soloist with the Tolima Choir, and she stayed in that role until the 1970s. With the choir she toured Cuba, Guatemala, the United States, and Europe. In the 1980s she formed her own choir, initially called the Leonor Buenaventura de Valencia Choir and now called the Rondalla Ibaguereña.

In 2004, Buenaventura recorded two albums with her choir at the University of Ibagué.

=== Personal life and death ===
Buenaventura married Gonzalo Valencia in Manizales in 1938. She was good friends with Matilde Díaz and Lucho Bermúdez, who recorded several of her compositions. She died on 2 June 2007 in Ibagué.

== Works ==
=== Compositions ===
Buenaventura's first composition was the pasillo "Morir Soñando", which she wrote at the request of her father, to accompany lyrics he had written. In 1947 she wrote the bambuco "La Ibaguereña", a tribute to her sister Olga who had died in 1939. The song, along with her porro "Ibagué", became an anthem of the city of Ibagué.

Many of Buenaventura's songs have lyrics that address themes of death. She also wrote about political topics, including "La Guerrillera" and "¿Por qué?" about victims of La Violencia. She also composed many songs for children, which were published together in the collection Canciones Infantiles.

Other notable compositions by Buenaventura include "Tolima Mío", "Novia del Sol Antioqueño", "Calentanita", and "Leyendas de Mi Tierra". Her songs have been recorded by artists including Víctor Hugo Ayala, Garzón y Collazos, Helenita Vargas, and her friends Matilde Díaz and Lucho Bermúdez.

=== Poetry ===
Buenaventura was introduced to poetry by her father and by her uncle Roberto Torres Vargas, who were both poets themselves. She began writing her own poetry as a child. Her poem "Dime la Verdad" (Spanish for "tell me the truth") was written about an infidelity of her husband during a trip to Cuba with the Tolima Choir.
