= Crescencio Salcedo =

Colombian flautist and songwriter

- Born: Crescencio Salcedo Monroy; 27 August 1913; Pinillos, Colombia
- Died: 3 March 1976 (aged 62) Medellín, Colombia

Crescencio Salcedo Monroy (Note: In this Spanish name, the first or paternal surname is Salcedo and the second or maternal family name is Monroy.) (1913–1976) was a Colombian flautist and songwriter. He wrote notable songs including "El Año Viejo" in several tropical music genres, and was admired by Gabriel García Márquez.

== Biography ==
Salcedo was born on 27 August 1913 in Palomino, a district of Pinillos in the Colombian department of Bolívar. His parents were Lucas Salcedo and Belén Monroy, and he had five siblings. As a child Salcedo learned to play and make flutes, and he did not attend school but was taught various trades by his maternal grandfather Telésforo Monroy.

As a young man Salcedo worked as a merchant and sailor on the Magdalena River. When his grandfather died he moved to La Guajira, where he lived for 8 years with indigenous people and became a yerbatero. After living in Paraguaipoa, Venezuela, he spent time in Santa Marta, Barranquilla, Cartagena, Sincelejo, Montería, and Bogotá, selling flutes on the streets, before settling in Medellín in the mid-1960s. In his memoir Living to Tell the Tale, Gabriel García Márquez describes watching Salcedo perform in Barranquilla:

"Crescencio Salcedo, a barefoot Indian who would stand on the corner of the Americana to sing without ceremony songs of his own and other people's creation, in a voice that had some tin in it, but with a very personal art that imposed itself on the daily crowd on Calle San Blas. I had spent a good part of my early youth standing near him, not even greeting him, not letting myself be seen, until I learned by heart his vast repertoire of everybody's songs."

Salcedo wrote several popular songs, including "El Año Viejo", but recorded only rarely. His albums include Tipicismo, published by Codiscos in the 1960s, and a few albums for Discos Tropical and Sonolux with Los Indios Selectos, a group comprising Salcedo, Alberto Pacheco, Ángel Martínez, and Tadeo Fuentes.

Salcedo died on 3 March 1976 in Medellín of cerebral thrombosis. Shortly before his death, Colombian poet Manuel Hernández had encountered him selling flutes on the streets and convinced Artesanías de Colombia to buy some of them.

=== Personal life ===
According to Salcedo, he never married and had five children: Rafael, Santiago, Francisco, Martín and Ramón.

== Musical style and compositions ==
Salcedo wrote over 100 songs in various styles including paseo, puya, cumbia, porro, merengue, and pasillo. His first composition was "El Gusto de las Mujeres", which he wrote in 1928, and his first commercial success was the cumbia "Cosquillas", which he recorded for RCA Victor in 1939.

Several of Salcedo's songs became widely known, although he rarely recorded them himself and was often reluctant to claim ownership. (Note: Radio Nacional de Colombia quotes Salcedo as saying "I never like to pass myself off as the composer of any work. I have never believed that one composes anything, but that the only thing one does is to collect motifs".) His most famous composition is "El Año Viejo", which was notably recorded by Mexican singer Tony Camargo, who first heard it in Venezuela. He also claimed to have written "La Múcura", although José Pinilla Aguilar argues in Cultores de la Música Colombiana that the melody was probably part of folk tradition before Salcedo's birth. Similarly, Pinilla Aguilar suggests that "El Hombre Caimán", often attributed to Salcedo and later adapted by José María Peñaranda into the song "Se Va el Caimán", was probably written by Daniel Lemaitre.

Some of these compositions, including "La Múcura", "Mi Cafetal" and "Se va el Caimán", were attributed to the Colombian musician and record producer Antonio Fuentes, because they were registered at the beginning under his name, and recorded by singers as "Trío nacional" and "Los Trovadores de Barú", as well as by Bobby Cappo in 1949 and Pérez Prado, known as the "King of Mambo", during the 1950s.

Salcedo wrote the lyrics to "Mi Cafetal", but according to Marcial Marchena Marín, "by 1939 this music was already known on the coast under the name of "Se Marchitaron las Flores", (Note: The song was recorded under that title by Guillermo Buitrago.) and Andrés Paz Barros was considered the author...Crescencio set the lyrics to the melody of Paz Barros." The song "La Varita de Caña" is also sometimes attributed to Salcedo, but according to Marchena Marín, "the people from the coast say that it was created by Julio Sobrino."

Other notable compositions by Salcedo include "Santa Marta y Cartagena" (a porro that was at one point claimed by an Argentine called Nóbile), "La Mano Descompuesta", "La Puerca Pollera", "Nació para Presidente", and "Colombia con Venezuela".
