= Alejandro Tovar =

Colombian musician and composer

- Also known as: Alex Tovar, Alex Tobar
- Born: Wolfano Alejandro Tovar García; 24 May 1908; Bogotá, Colombia
- Died: 23 February 1975 (aged 66) Bogotá, Colombia

Wolfano Alejandro Tovar García (Note: Tovar can also be spelled Tobar. In this Spanish name, the first or paternal surname is Tovar and the second or maternal family name is García.) (1908–1975), known as Alejandro Tovar or Alex Tovar, was a Colombian musician and composer. He played in the orchestras of Lucho Bermúdez and Efraín Orozco Morales, and led his own orchestra at the Hotel Granada in Bogotá. His best-known composition is the song "Pachito Eché".

== Biography ==
Tovar was born 24 May 1908 in Bogotá, Colombia, in the neighbourhood of San Diego. He learned to play violin as a child, and gave his first concert at the age of 9. He later learned to play saxophone, clarinet, guitar, viola, flute, trumpet, piano, accordion, and double bass.

Tovar studied in Bonn and in 1925 returned to Bogotá and joined Anastasio Bolívar's jazz band. From 1930 to 1933 Tovar and the band played regularly on HJN, the Colombian state radio station. In 1935 Tovar joined Efraín Orozco Morales' orchestra and toured with them in southern South America until he returned again to Bogotá in 1942.

From 1944 to 1950 Tovar played with three orchestras at the Hotel Granada in Bogotá. The first was Rafael Bolívar's Orquesta Ritmos, alongside Lucho Bermúdez and Matilde Díaz. The second was the Orquesta de Lucho Bermúdez, formed by Bermúdez in 1947 when he returned from a year-long recording contract with RCA Victor in Buenos Aires, and co-led by Tovar. The third was Tovar's own orchestra, which played at the hotel from 1948 to 1950.

While working at the Hotel Granada, Tovar also played regularly on the Radiodifusora Nacional de Colombia (now the Radio Nacional de Colombia), was a member of the National Symphony Orchestra, and accompanied the tenor Luis Macía González on piano. He was intermittently president of SAYCO, the Colombian copyright collective.

Tovar died on 23 February 1975 in Bogotá. At the time of his death he was a member of the Colombian Symphony Orchestra.

== Compositions ==
Tovar's best-known composition is the porro "Pachito Eché", which he wrote for Francisco "Pacho" Echeverri Duque, owner of the Hotel Granada. He wrote the song in 1948, and it was first recorded by the hotel orchestra with Jorge Noriega on vocals, and released by Discos Tropical. It has been recorded over 200 times by Colombian and international artists.

Other notable compositions by Tovar include the pasillo "Romanza de amor", and the songs "Cumbia del Caribe", "Engaño", "Impuesto de soltería", "Qué es la cosa", "El marido", "Recordaré tu cariño", and "Son carretón".
