= Emilio Sierra =

Colombian musician and composer (1891–1957)

- Born: Emilio Sierra Baquero; 15 September 1891; Fusagasugá, Colombia
- Died: 8 March 1957 (aged 65) Cali, Colombia

Emilio Sierra Baquero (Note: In this name that follows Hispanic American naming customs, the first or paternal surname is Sierra and the second or maternal family name is Baquero.) (15 September 1891 – 8 March 1957) was a Colombian musician and composer. Alongside Milcíades Garavito Wheeler he is credited with developing the Colombian musical genre of rumba criolla, also known as "rumba bogotana".

== Biography ==
Emilio Sierra Baquero was born on 15 September 1891 in Fusagasugá, in the Colombian department of Cundinamarca, to Teodomilda Baquero and Vicente Sierra. As a child he learned to play guitar, tiple, and harmonium. Beginning in 1906, Sierra directed his local choir in Fusagasugá. He then moved to Bogotá and directed choirs in various towns around the city, including Chía, Chipaque, Zipaquirá, and Girardot. In November 1921 Sierra married María Espinel Sabogal, with whom he had three children.

Sierra returned to Bogotá in 1935 and lived there for the following decade. During this period, he studied at the National Conservatory, led his own orchestra, and, alongside Milcíades Garavito Wheeler, is credited with developing the musical genre known as rumba criolla. In 1938, the year Radio Santa Fe began broadcasting, Sierra performed his composition "Vivan los novios" on the station. He recorded the song in 1940, identifying it as a rumba criolla, and subsequently recorded two songs with Matilde Díaz and her sister Elvira. In 1945, Sierra left Bogotá to embark on a nationwide musical tour. He eventually settled in Tuluá, where he taught at the Colegio del Pacífico. In 1946, helped establish SAYCO, Colombia's collective management organisation for musical copyright, and served as its first president.

Sierra died on 8 March 1957 in Cali.

== Musical style and compositions ==
Sierra composed over 120 songs. He is known for being one of the first composers of rumba criolla, and his notable compositions in the genre include "Vivan los novios", "Trago a los músicos", and "A juerguiar tocan". Sierra also composed in the styles of bambuco, pasillo, porro, and bolero.

Several of Sierra's compositions were given lyrics by Luis Eduardo Castillo, Rafael Almanza, and José Joaquín Jiménez. He also wrote some lyrics himself, for example to the song "Mojicón".
