= Rafael Mejía Romani =

Colombian musician and songwriter

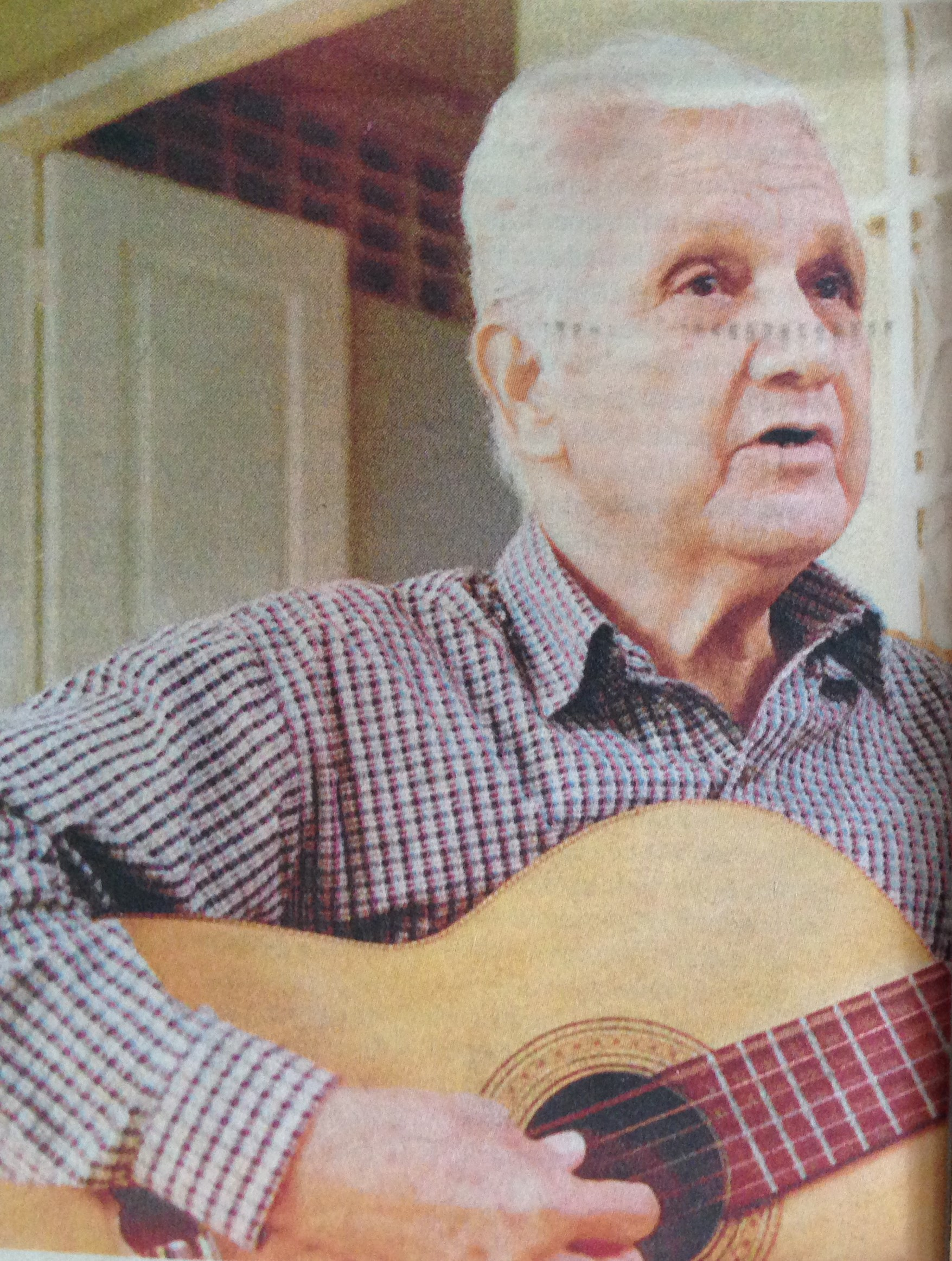

Background information
- Born: Rafael David Mejía Romani; 26 March 1920; Barranquilla, Colombia
- Died: 18 June 2003 (aged 83)
- Spouse: Ramonita Padilla

Rafael David Mejía Romani (1920–2003) was a Colombian musician and songwriter. He wrote over 300 songs, and is particularly remembered as a composer of boleros, and for writing the porro "Paisaje" and the cumbia "Cumbia Sobre el Mar".

== Biography ==
Mejía was born in Barranquilla, Colombia, on 26 March 1920. He began his musical career at 13, playing boleros and pasillos in the group Remembranza alongside his father Francisco Javier Mejía de la Hoz.

In the 1940s Mejía formed the duo Sentimiento Colombiano with Julio Samudio, and they started appearing on the radio. Sentimiento Colombiano had success with Mejía's compositions "Arroyito Campesino", "Donde Canta el Ruiseñor", "Triste Sin Ti" and "Esta Es Colombia". Later they expanded to the Trío Serenata, and toured Colombia supporting singers including Eva Garza and Sara Montiel.

In 1955 Mejía wrote "Carmiña", a song inspired by the beauty queen Carmiña Moreno. It was the first of several songs he wrote for beauty queens, including "Adelita" for Adela Segovia and "Cumbia Sobre el Mar" for Martha Ligia Restrepo, who was Miss Colombia in 1962.

For several years Mejía and his Trío Serenata were regular performers at a Chinese restaurant in Barranquilla called the Chop Suey, where other musicians including Lucho Gatica, Toña la Negra, Felipe Pirela, Johnny Albino and Los Panchos — as well as locals like Alberto Pacheco — would watch them play.

Mejía was married to Ramonita Padilla, with whom he had three children. He died on 18 June 2003.

== Musical style and compositions ==
Mejía composed over 300 songs. His best-known compositions are "Cumbia Sobre el Mar" (recorded by Quantic and Pacho Galán) and "Paisaje" (recorded by Carmencita Pernett, Claudia de Colombia, Los Isleños, and Billo's Caracas Boys).

Mejía is considered an important composer of bolero in Colombia. His bolero "Mientras Me Quieras Tú", recorded by Leo Marini, brought him particular recognition. Mejía's other notable boleros include "Vidas Iguales", "Nadie Más Que Tú", "Por Dios Que Eres Bonita", "Despierta Corazón", "Ahí Estás Tú", "Sabes Muy Bien", "Más y Más" and "Será Por Eso".

Mejía composed in several other styles, with other notable songs including:

- cumbia: "Como Nace el Amor", "Adelita", "Cumbia Morena"
- pasillo: "Falso Amor", "Alma Errante", "Pobrecito Corazón", "Tu Partida"
- merengue: "Loquito Por Tí", "Chinita Linda", "No Dudes de Mí", "Esta Es Colombia"
- porro: "Bahía de Santa Marta", "Diciembre Azul"
- others: "Por Tu Culpa" (ranchera), "Mi Ranchito" (paseo), "Gaita de Amor" (gaita), and "Picotero" (guaracha)
