= Hotel Granada =

Former hotel in Bogotá, Colombia

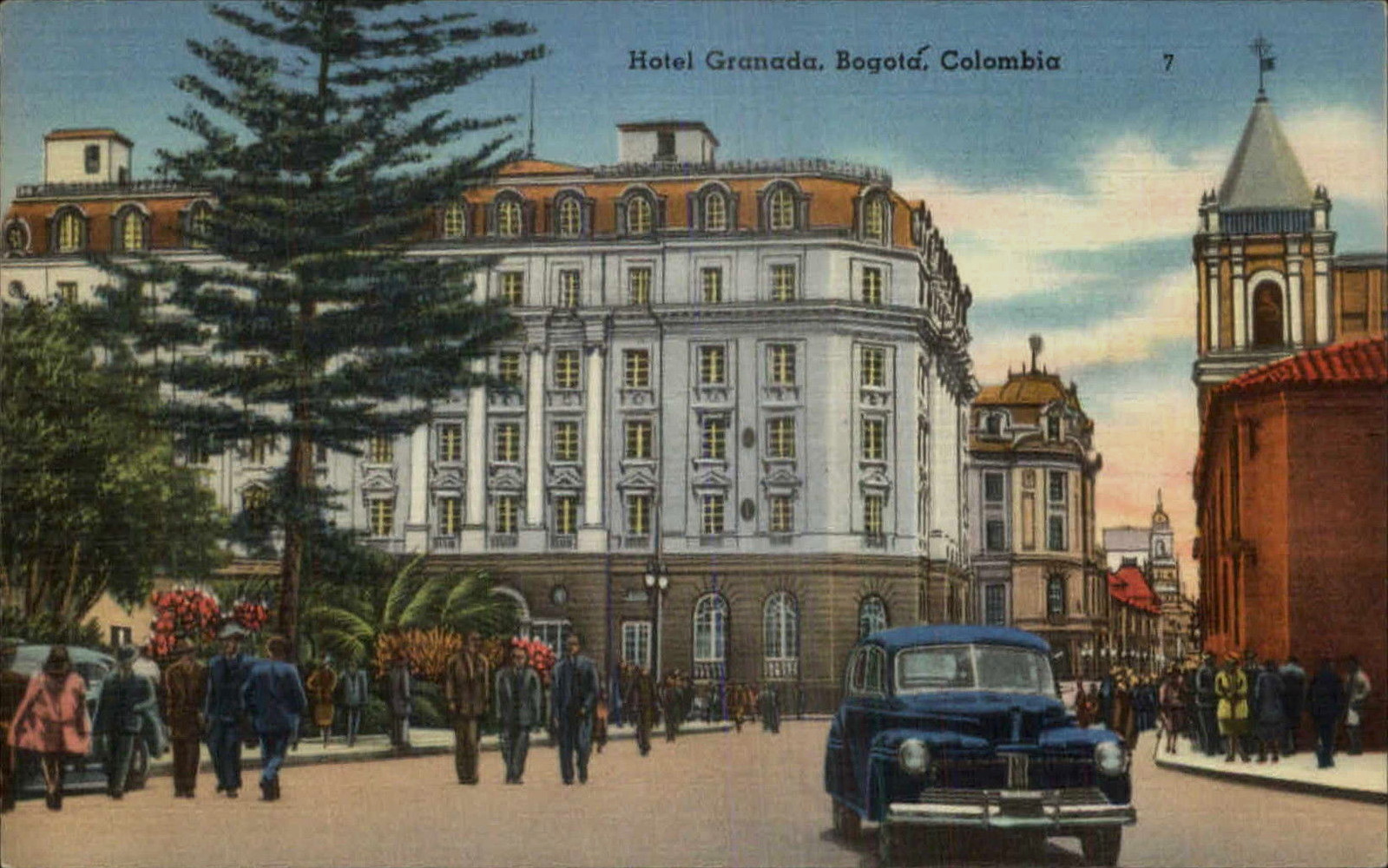
- Hotel Granada viewed from the north in a postcard from the 1940s

General information
- Status: Demolished
- Type: Hotel
- Architectural style: Beaux-Arts
- Location: Bogotá, Colombia, Carrera Séptima and Avenida Jiménez
- Opened: 1928
- Demolished: 1951

Technical details
- Floor count: 8

Design and construction
- Architect: Alberto Manrique Martín

The Hotel Granada was a hotel in central Bogotá, the capital of Colombia. It stood on the southeastern corner of the intersection of Carrera Séptima and Avenida Jiménez, on the southern side of Santander Park. Designed in the Beaux-Arts style by Alberto Manrique Martín, it was inaugurated in 1928. It was demolished in 1951, and a Bank of the Republic building was later erected on the site.

== History ==
Architect Diego Suárez prepared the preliminary design for the building in Paris, but the plans were adapted by Alberto Manrique Martín, who also designed other high-rise buildings in Bogotá in the 1920s, including the Cubillos Building and the Teatro San Jorge. Together with the Hotel Regina and the Jockey Club, it was one of the buildings that reshaped the urban space around Santander Park and gave the area a stately character for decades.

The hotel was built by the Chilean architectural firm Casanovas y Mannheim and opened in 1928. At the time, the San Francisco River still ran in the open, Avenida Jiménez had not yet been built, and the Post and Telegraph Building still stood between Carrera Séptima and Carrera Octava.

The hotel had 160 rooms and 108 apartments, all with bathrooms and telephones. Its amenities included a beauty salon and barber shop, a restaurant, a bar, a tea room, and the Salón Azul restaurant. From Monday to Friday it served grilled dishes, and on weekends it functioned as a ballroom. Musician Lucho Bermúdez performed there on several occasions, and his early artistic career was closely linked to the hotel.

The building survived the fires of the Bogotazo. It was demolished in 1951, and the Bank of the Republic Building was constructed in its place.

== In popular culture ==
The Hotel Granada is mentioned in Alejandro Tovar's porro "Pachito Eché", a tribute to Francisco Echeverri, the hotel's manager.

== See also ==
- History of Bogotá
