= Carmencita Pernett =

Colombian singer (1925–2014)

- Also known as: Queen of the Tropics
- Born: Sidney Pernett Trujillo; 11 October 1925; Cartagena, Colombia
- Died: 22 December 2014 (aged 89) Mexico City, Mexico
- Genre: Tropical music

Sidney Pernett Trujillo (Note: In this Spanish name, the first or paternal surname is Pernett and the second or maternal family name is Trujillo.) (1925–2014), known as Carmencita Pernett, was a Colombian singer. Pernett sang with several orchestras in Colombia, and helped to popularise the Colombian musical genres of cumbia and porro in North America. Her 1952 recording of "Me Voy a Plato" with Los Alegres Vallenatos was the first recorded vallenato sung by a woman. She lived much of her life in Mexico, where she was known as the "Queen of the Tropics" (Spanish: Reina del Trópico).

== Biography ==
Pernett was born in Cartagena, in the Colombian department of Bolívar, on 11 October 1925.

=== Music career ===
Around 1939 Pernett joined the orchestra of José Pianeta Pitalúa as a singer. This made her the first woman in Cartagena to sing porros with an orchestra, at a time when women singing Colombian music styles in public was frowned upon. She also sang with the Emisora Atlántico Jazz Band, led by trombonist Guido Perla, the Orquesta Emisoras Fuentes, the Orquesta Emisoras Unidas de Barranquilla (also known as "la romancera de la radio"), and during 1942 in the Jardín Águila. Around the same time she started calling herself Carmencita Pernett. She was later invited by Lucho Bermúdez to join his orchestra. In 1950, she performed in New York on NBC, performing Afro-Cuban and "stylizations of Colombian porro".

In 1952, Pernett recorded the son vallenato "Me Voy a Plato" (written by Armando Abello) for the Bogotá-based record label Vergara, backed by Los Alegres Vallenatos, the band founded by Julio Torres Mayorga. According to Julio Oñate Martínez, the song was the first recorded vallenato sung by a woman. Pernett later recorded other vallenatos including Alejo Durán's "039" and Tobías Enrique Pumarejo's "Callate Corazón".

Pernett lived in Cuba in 1954, and then moved to Mexico after marrying a Mexican, where she spent the rest of her life and became known as the "Queen of the Tropics" (Spanish: Reina del Trópico). In Mexico she sang with the orchestras of Rafael de Paz and Dámaso Pérez Prado, and she helped to popularise the Colombian genres of cumbia and porro in North America. Music critic Jaime Monsalve wrote that her Mexican recordings "reveal a different and unique understanding of Colombian Caribbean styles. With closer adherence to the score, and a special emphasis on the wind instruments and solo piano sections, the creations of Pacho Galán, Daniel Lemaitre, and José Barros seem...closer to the cha-cha-chá, mambo, or Cuban guaracha than to cumbia itself, porro, or gaita."

In Mexico, Pernett also sang on film soundtracks, including for the Italian film Anna accompanied by Tony Camargo.

=== Death ===
In later life, Pernett had Alzheimer's disease. She died in Mexico City on 22 December 2014.
