= Ride in Ibagué =

Bicycle-sharing system in Ibagué, Colombia

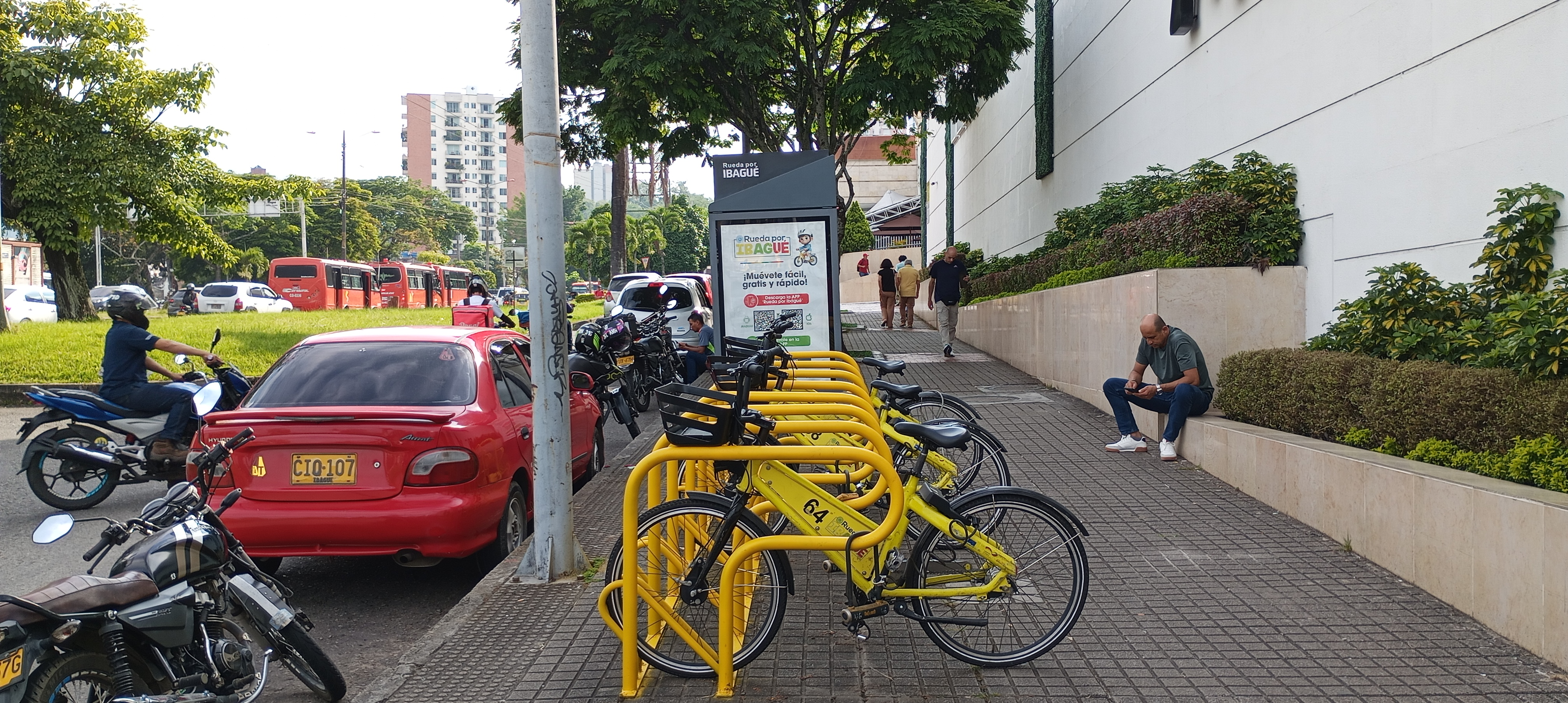
- Multicentro shopping mall station

Overview
- Native name: Rueda por Ibagué
- Area served: Ibagué, Colombia
- Transit type: Bicycle-sharing system
- Annual ridership: 7500 (2025)
- Website: www.infibague.gov.co/sistema-de-bicicletas-publicas

Operation
- Began operation: February 11, 2023; 3 years ago
- Operator: Infibagué
- Number of vehicles: 85

Ride in Ibagué (Rueda por Ibagué in Spanish) is a public bicycle-sharing system in Ibagué, Colombia, which began operation in February 11, 2023.

== Description ==
The system consists of 85 bicycles distributed over nine stations that are strategically located near points of attraction in the city. As of March 2026, the system had 2,426 active users and bicycles were rented over 7500 times in 2025.

The bicycles are free to use for Colombians aged 18 years old or older. Its hours of operation are from 6:30 am to 6:30 pm Monday through Friday and 8:00 am to 1:00 pm on weekends and bank holidays. To rent a bicycle, one must first register on-line on the Rueda por Ibagué iOS and Android application.

== Stations ==
The system has the following stations, listed from the west (closer to the city centre) to the east of Ibagué:

1. Belén Park
2. Bolívar Square
3. Panopticon Cultural Complex
4. Fontainebleau building
5. 42nd street Sports Complex
6. Multicentro shopping mall
7. La Estación shopping mall
8. University of Ibagué
9. 80th street Éxito
