= José María Peñaranda =

Colombian musician and songwriter

- Born: José María Peñaranda Márquez; 11 March 1907; Barranquilla, Colombia
- Died: 5 February 2006 (aged 98) Barranquilla, Colombia

José María Peñaranda Márquez (Note: In this Spanish name, the first or paternal surname is Peñaranda and the second or maternal family name is Márquez.) (1907–2006) was a Colombian musician and songwriter. He wrote the successful songs "Se Va el Caimán" and "Me Voy Pa' Cataca" and released the first 12-inch record on label Discos Fuentes in 1957.

== Biography ==
Peñaranda was born on 11 March 1907 in Barranquilla, capital of the Colombian department of Atlántico. As a child he often travelled to Magdalena with his mother Mercedes, who sold clothes in villages, and there he saw Francisco Moscote play. During his youth, he began composing and singing, accompanying himself on guitar and tiple. He later learned to play accordion and güiro. Peñaranda worked as an electrician and mason, and did not come from a musical family.

Peñaranda began writing songs in 1937; he also performed on local radio stations and began recording some of his songs during the early years of Colombia's recording industry. In 1940, while working as a technician at Emisoras Unidas, he composed "Se Va el Caimán" inspired by mythical creature—half man, half caiman—that he read about in newspapers. According to some sources, Peñaranda commissioned Pacho Galán to make a musical arrangement, and a local RCA Victor agent suggested sending it to Buenos Aires to be recorded. The song initially had little impact, but gained new life in 1945 with a successful version by Venezuelan singer Rosita Perón.

During the 1950s, Peñaranda began playing the accordion on his recordings, although on some early recordings he featured the accordionist Luis Enrique Martínez. He toured several countries in the Americas, including Puerto Rico and United States, in the 1940s–60s, and recorded hundreds of albums on record labels across the continent, including around 20 with his group Peñaranda y Sus Muchachos. The 1957 album Las Secretarias, attributed to Peñaranda y su Conjunto, was the first 12-inch record released by Colombian record label Discos Fuentes.

Peñaranda died on Sunday, 5 February 2006 in Barranquilla.

== Musical style and compositions ==
=== Lyrical content ===
Peñaranda was particularly known writing lyrics containing double entendre or explicit sexual content. Some of his LPs came with the warning "For adults only". Late in his life he converted to Christianity and expressed regret for his lyrical themes.

=== "Se Va el Caimán" ===
Peñaranda's best-known song is "Se Va el Caimán", which he wrote around 1940. The song was initially called "El Hombre Caimán", and may have been adapted from a song of the same name by Crescencio Salcedo (the melody of which José Pinilla Aguilar claims was probably written by Daniel Lemaitre).

Peñaranda first performed the song on Barranquilla radio station Voz del Litoral, playing guitar accompanied by Ana Luisa Colón on tiple and another musician on dulzaina and guacharaca. An acetate disc of this version eventually reached Eduardo Armani, who recorded the song as a porro in 1945. Rosita Perón recorded a successful version in Venezuela in 1945, and in 1946 the song appeared in the Mexican film Pasiones Tormentosas sung by Kiko Mendive.

Also in 1946, Colombian Efraín Orozco Morales recorded a version of "Se Va el Caimán" with his orchestra, adding an additional verse. Orozco lived in Argentina, and his version of the song was very popular there; when footballer Efraín Sánchez arrived to play for San Lorenzo de Almagro in 1948, he was nicknamed "El Caimán" because he came from Barranquilla. Other versions were recorded by several Colombian and international artists, in multiple languages, and Peñaranda released a version of his own in paseo vallenato style in the 1980s.

=== Other compositions ===
Another successful song written by Peñaranda is "Me Voy Pa' Cataca", which appeared in the 1950 Mexican film Amor Salvaje, and was later made famous by Nelson Pinedo and La Sonora Matancera under the name "Me Voy Pa' La Habana". Other notable songs by Peñaranda include "La Cosecha de Mujeres", "Las Cuatro Hijas", "Que le Den", "Las Secretarias", "Teresa", "Opera del Mondongo", "Compadre le Vendo un Carro", "La Bomba Atómica", "Celso", and "El Peluquero". His song "El Coge Coge" was written about the assassination of Jorge Eliécer Gaitán.
