= Victor Perez =

Victor Perez or Víctor Pérez may refer to:

== People ==
- Victor Perez (Tunisian boxer) (1911–1945), Tunisian boxer
  - Victor Young Perez, 2013 French biographical film about Victor Perez
- Víctor Pérez (Puerto Rican boxer) (born 1971)
- Víctor Pérez (director) (born 1981), Spanish director, producer and digital film compositor
- Victor Perez (golfer) (born 1992), French golfer
- Víctor Pérez (weightlifter) (born 1953), Cuban Olympic weightlifter
- Víctor Pérez (footballer) (born 1988), Spanish footballer
- Víctor Pérez Varela, Chilean politician
- Víctor Pablo Pérez (born 1954), Spanish conductor
- Víctor Pérez Pérez, Mexican journalist murdered in 2014
- Víctor Manuel Pérez Rojas (1940–2019), Venezuelan bishop

== See also ==
- Killing of Victor Perez

See also: All pages with titles containing Victor Perez
