= Rafael Mejía =

Rafael Mejía may refer to:

- Hipólito Mejía (Rafael Hipólito Mejía Domínguez, born 1941) Dominican politician who was president in 2000–2004
- Rafael Mejía Romani (1920–2003), Colombian musician and songwriter
