= Carmen de Bolívar (song) =

Song
- Released: 1958
- Songwriter(s): Lucho Bermúdez

"Carmen de Bolívar" is a Colombian song written and performed by Lucho Bermúdez. The song, released in 1958, is about Bermudez's home town, El Carmen de Bolívar in Colombia's Bolívar Department.

Viva Music Colombia rated the song No. 14 on its list of the 100 most important Colombian songs of all time. In its list of the 50 best Colombian songs of all time, El Tiempo, Colombia's most widely circulated newspaper, ranked the version of the song by Lucho Bermudez and his orchestra at No. 20.
