= Alberto Castilla =

Colombian musician

Alberto Castilla Buenaventura (Bogotá 9 April 1878 – Ibagué 10 June 1937), was a Colombian composer. He was born in Bogotá. He was also an engineer, journalist, poet, writer, mathematician and musician. He founded the Conservatory of Tolima in 1906.

He composed the famous instrumental "Bunde Tolimense" to which Nicanor Velásquez added verses to create what is now the Hymn of the Tolima Department.
