= Rumba =

Several music styles of Cuban origin

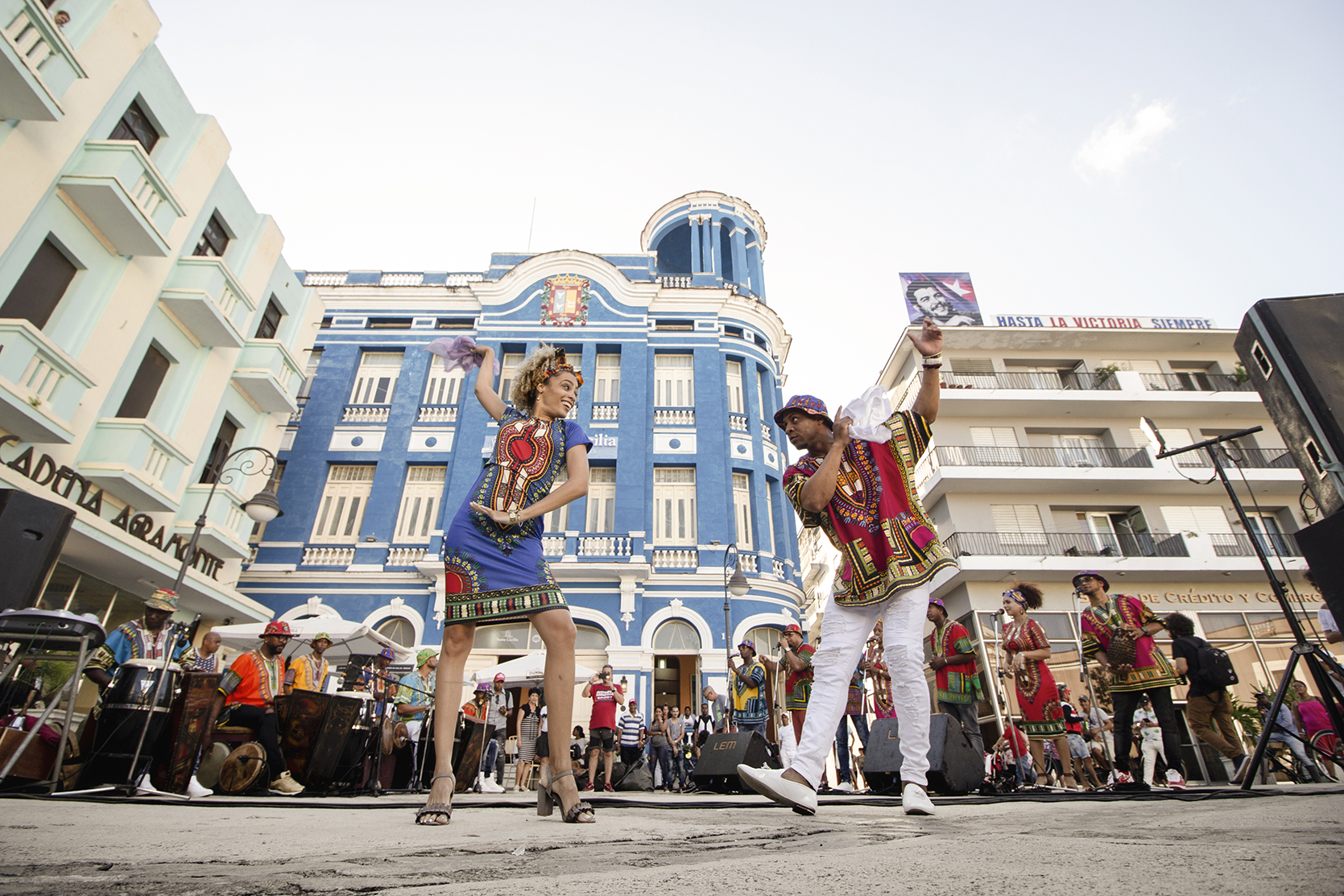
Cuban rumba dancers at the workers square in Camagüey, Cuba.

The term rumba may refer to a variety of unrelated music styles. Originally, "rumba" was used as a synonym for "party" in northern Cuba, and by the late 19th century it was used to denote the complex of secular music styles known as Cuban rumba. Since the early 20th century the term has been used in different countries to refer to distinct styles of music and dance, most of which are only tangentially related to the original Cuban rumba, if at all. The vague etymological origin of the term rumba, as well as its interchangeable use with guaracha in settings such as bufo theatre, is largely responsible for such worldwide polysemy of the term. In addition, "rumba" was the primary marketing term for Cuban music in North America, as well as West and Central Africa, during much of the 20th century, before the rise of mambo, pachanga and salsa.

"Rumba" entered the English lexicon in the early 20th century. Also in the first third of the 20th century, "rumba" entered the Spanish flamenco world as a fast-paced palo (style) inspired in the Cuban guaracha, and which gave rise to other forms of urban music now known as "rumba". Throughout Latin America, "rumba" acquired different connotations, mostly referring to Cubanized, danceable, local styles, such as Colombian rumba criolla (creole rumba). At the same time, "rumba" began to be used a catch-all term for Afro-Cuban music in most African countries, later giving rise to re-Africanized Cuban-based styles such as Congolese rumba.

== In Cuba ==
During the second half of the 19th century, several secular dance-oriented music styles were developed by Afro-Cuban workers in the poor neighbourhoods of Havana and Matanzas. These syncretic styles would later be referred to as "rumba", a word that also meant "party". Traditionally, the three main styles of rumba are yambú, columbia and guaguancó, each of which has a characteristic dance, rhythm and singing. Although still a purely folkloric genre, numerous innovations have been introduced in rumba since the mid 20th century, including new styles such as batá-rumba and guarapachangueo.

== In North America ==
In the US, the term "rhumba" (anglicised version of rumba) began to be used during the 1920s to refer to ballroom music with Afro-Cuban music themes, particularly in the context of big band music. This music was mostly inspired by son cubano, while being rhythmically and instrumentally unrelated to Cuban rumba. By 1935, with the release of "The Peanut Vendor" by Don Azpiazú and the popularity of Xavier Cugat and other Latin artists, the genre had become highly successful and well-defined. The rhumba dance that developed on the East Coast of the United States was based on the bolero-son. The first rumba competition took place in the Savoy Ballroom in 1930. Nowadays, two different styles of ballroom rumba coexist: American style and International style.

From 1935 to the 1950s, the Mexican and American film industry expanded the use of the term rumba as rumbera films became popular. In this context, rumberas were Cuban and Mexican divas, singers and actresses who sang boleros and canciones, but rarely rumbas. Notable rumberas include Rita Montaner, Rosa Carmina, María Antonieta Pons and Ninón Sevilla.

In the 1970s, with the emergence of salsa as a popular music and dance genre in the US, rhythmic elements of Cuban rumba (particularly guaguancó) became prevalent alongside the son. Like salsa, rhumba would then be danced to salsa ensembles instead of big bands. By the end of the 20th century, rhumba was also danced to pop music and jazz bands as seen in TV shows like Dancing with the Stars.

== In Spain ==
In Spain, the term rumba was introduced in the early 20th century as rumba flamenca, one of the palos (styles) of flamenco. Particularly, it is considered one of the cantes de ida y vuelta, since flamenco itself might have had an influence on Cuban rumba, particularly on its vocal style. However, musicologists agree that rumba flamenca does not truly derive from Cuban rumba, but from guaracha, a fast-paced music style from Havana. Apart from rumba flamenca, other syncretic styles of Afro-Cuban origin have been named "rumba" throughout the Iberian peninsula, outside of the context of flamenco (where the term cantes de ida y vuelta is mostly restricted), such as the Galician rumba.

In the late 1950s, popular artists such as Peret (El Rey de la Rumba) and El Pescaílla developed an uptempo style that combined elements from rumba flamenca, Spanish gypsy music and pop. This became known as Catalan rumba (rumba catalana). In the 1980s, the style gained international popularity thanks to French ensemble Gipsy Kings.

In the 1990s, the term “tecno-rumba” was used to describe the music of Camela, and later Azúcar Moreno. Since the early 2000s, the term rumba has been used in Spain to refer to derivatives of Catalan rumba with hip hop and rock elements, as recorded by Estopa, Huecco and Melendi.

== In Colombia ==
In the late 1930s and early 1940s, Colombian musicians such as Emilio Sierra, Milciades Garavito, Efraín Orozco, and Diógenes Chaves Pinzón developed a fusion of bambuco and Afro-Cuban music known as rumba criolla (Creole rumba). Born and raised in Colombia's interior, these musicians grew up surrounded by bambucos, pasillos, waltzes, and string-based music, often learning to play through church music programmes or local bands. The genre was also referred to as bambuco fiestero (festive bambuco) or bambuco recalentado (reheated bambuco), particularly when performed in jazz-band format). Rumba criolla developed distinct regional styles, including rumba antioqueña and rumba tolimense. Emilio Sierra described it as "a fandango, the younger brother of bambuco, more Colombian and more joyful".

Performances by ensembles such as "Emilio Sierra y su Orquesta" and the "Orquesta Garavito" illustrate the instrumentation associated with rumba criolla which included violins, trumpets, trombones, saxophones, maracas, pianos, doublebass, and ocassionally bongos. The genre also featured an interplay between 3/4 and 6/8 rhythmic patterns, reflecting its connections to bambucos. Another example is the Orquesta Garavito's recording of "Es algo que tiene gracia", which opens with a Cuban rumba rhythm featuring the genre's characteristic clave pattern.

== In Africa ==
In the 1930s and 1940s, Afro-Cuban son groups such as Septeto Habanero, Trio Matamoros and Los Guaracheros de Oriente were played over Radio Congo Belge in Léopoldville (Kinshasa), gaining widespread popularity in the country during the following decades. Their recordings were also made available to the public as part of the G.V. Series of 10" singles released by the British record label, His Master's Voice throughout Africa. Once local bands tried to emulate the sound of Cuban son (incorrectly referred to as "rumba" in Africa, despite being unrelated to Cuban rumba), their music became known as Congolese rumba or rumba Lingala. By the late 1960s, Congolese rumba was an established genre in most of Central Africa, and it would also impact the music of West and East Africa under Muziki wa dansi. Franco's OK Jazz and Le Grand Kallé's African Jazz were amongst the most successful Congolese rumba ensembles of the 20th century. A faster subgenre known as soukous (from the French word secouer, "to shake") was developed in the late 1960s by bands such as African Fiesta and is often used as a synonym of the former.
