= El Año Viejo =

Song
- Genre: Cumbia
- Songwriter: Crescencio Salcedo

"El Año Viejo" (translation "the old year") is a song written by the Colombian songwriter Crescencio Salcedo in the cumbia genre. First recorded in 1953, the song has been described as "the legitimate and necessary hymn to say goodbye to the old year."

Salcedo was an indigenous farmer who could neither read nor write. Despite the song's popularity, Salcedo died poor, selling flutes on the streets of Medellín.

== Significance ==
With lyrics reflecting on the year passed, the song is associated with the end of the year and has been recorded by numerous artists throughout Latin America.

In its list of the 50 best Colombian songs of all time, El Tiempo, Colombia's most widely circulated newspaper, ranked the version of the song recorded by Tony Camargo and his Orchestra at No. 15. Viva Music Colombia rated the song No. 16 on its list of the 100 most important Colombian songs of all time.

El Telégrafo, an Ecuadorian newspaper, described the iconic song's impact: 'Every year, during the last week of December, wherever we are (at home, in the office, in the car or on the street) we have heard, for many years now, a song that has a rhythm and lyrics that penetrate subtly thought, body and soul. It is a melody that causes joy, but, at the same time, it also causes us sadness and melancholy."

== Versions ==
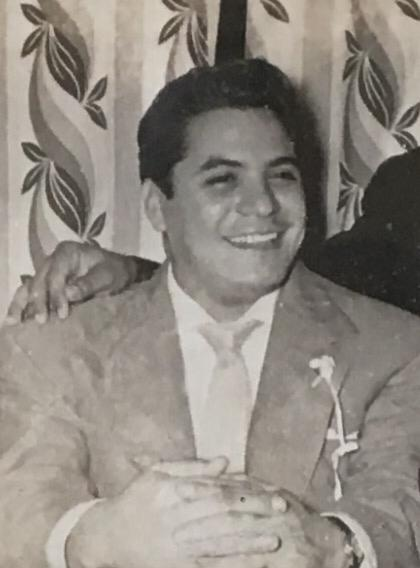
Tony Camargo

The most popular version of the song was recorded by Mexican singer, Tony Camargo in 1955. Another version, by Aniceto Molina, was selected by Hip Latina in 2017 as one of the "13 Old School Songs Every Colombian Grew Up Listening To" and described as a "legendary song" that was "a guaranteed song on the playlist for every New Year's Eve party." Celia Cruz's version was posthumously included on the compilation album Navidad Caribeña (2003) and reached number 12 on the Billboard Hot Latin Songs chart and number one on the Billboard Tropical Airplay chart in the United States.

Other artists recording the song include:

- Ninel Conde
- Oscar D'León (salsa version)
- Raúl di Blasio
- Rigo Domínguez
- Mike Laure
- Diana Reyes
- Samo and the Socios del Ritmo
- Gilberto Santa Rosa (salsa genre)
- Ninón Sevilla accompanied by the Pérez Prado orchestra
- Rigo Tovar
- Vicentico Valdés
- Aníbal Velásquez Hurtado
- Yuri

== See also ==
- List of number-one Billboard Hot Tropical Songs of 2004
