= La Múcura =

Traditional Colombian cumbia song

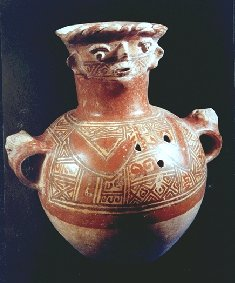
A Mayan múcura

"La Múcura" (the earthenware jar, es:múcura) is a traditional Colombian cumbia song.

== Composition ==
Rhythmically, the song is an example of a cumbia or Afro-Caribbean rhythm that may have originally been used for courtship rituals among Africans. The word cumbia itself may be related to cumbé, a Kongo word meaning "noise" that may be at the root of other Spanish words as well, viz. "cumbancha," a noisy party.

== Lyrics ==
The lyrics begin:

La múcura está en el suelo, mamá, no puedo con ella. Me la arrebató una estrella.

It was composed by Crescencio Salcedo, a flute player who also composed "Mi Cafetal", and has received many recorded versions. In 1948 it was recorded by Los Trovadores de Barú for Discos Fuentes, then in 1950 entering Mexican cinema in versions by Ninón Sevilla and Pérez Prado. "Little Jug" by Johnny Martin 1950 was an English-lyric version.

The song's lyrics are an example of double entendre in Hispanic popular song, according to social scientist Marcelino Canino Salgado. The image of the broken water jug (el cántaro roto) is an old and common metaphor for the loss of virginity in Latin and Latin American culture. The word "múcura" was once thought of as having precolombian origins but it is in fact of likely Kikuyu origin. Its meaning, in Colombian Spanish, is the same as "cántaro", namely, a clay jug. Salcedo himself claimed that "múcura" was a nickname for a short and herniated man.
