= Colombia Tierra Querida =

Song by Lucho Bermúdez
- Recorded: 1970
- Genre: Cumbia
- Label: CBS Records
- Songwriter: Lucho Bermúdez

"Colombia Tierra Querida" (translation "Colombia dear land") is a song written by Lucho Bermúdez in the Colombian cumbia genre. It is also the name of the 1970 album by Bermúdez, released on CBS Records, that introduced the song.

The song was popularized in 1970 with a version of the song recorded by Bermúdez and his orchestra with vocals by Matilde Diaz. Since its release, the song has been covered by many artists and is one of the most widely recognized pieces of Colombian popular music. It has been described as a "second national anthem" by multiple Colombian media.

The song has been listed as one of the greatest Colombian songs of all time by multiple media outlets:

- In its list of the top ten Colombian songs, El Heraldo rated Colombia Tierra Querida at No. 2.
- In its list of the ten most iconic Colombian songs, El Nuevo Siglo, rated Colombia Tierra Querida at No. 2.
- In its list of the 50 best Colombian songs of all time, El Tiempo, Colombia's most widely circulated newspaper, ranked the song at No. 4.
- Viva Music Colombia also rated the song No. 2 on its list of the 100 most important Colombian songs of all time.

Juan Carlos Coronel covered the song in 1994. In December 2020, Disney announced that its upcoming animated film Encanto, set in Colombia, would feature Coronel's version of the song.

Other artists covering the song include Checo Acosta, Andrés Cabas, Carolina la O, and the Bogotá Philharmonic Orchestra. It was also performed in 2015 on the Colombian version of "The Voice" by Fanny Lu, Cepeda, and Maluma, the official YouTube video of which has received over 7 million views. In 2019, the song was used as the opening of the so-called "Plantón Sinfónico" during the 2019 protests in Colombia.
