= Efraín Orozco =

Colombian musician, composer, and bandleader

- Born: Efraín Orozco Morales; 22 January 1897; Cajibío, Colombia
- Died: 27 August 1975 (aged 78) Bogotá, Colombia

Efraín Orozco Morales (Note: In this Spanish name, the first or paternal surname is Orozco and the second or maternal family name is Morales.) (1897–1975) was a Colombian musician, composer, and bandleader. He was bandleader of the group Efraín Orozco y su Orquesta de las Américas, and wrote several songs that were successful in Colombia and Argentina.

== Biography ==
=== Early life ===
Orozco was born on 22 January 1897 in Cajibío, in the Colombian department of Cauca. His mother Amelia Morales taught him guitar as a child, and his father Cenón Orozco Salazar gave him a cornet when he was 8 years old. Orozco was taught cornet by Ignacio Tovar, and composition and flute by Juan Calambás.

At the age of 12 Orozco played bass drum and cornet in the military band of Popayán, and afterwards he played in a tropical music orchestra in Buga. At the age of 19 he left Colombia and for five years travelled in Panama, Costa Rica, and Peru with his friend Leonardo Pazos. At 19 Orozco had already written the songs "Adiós a Popayán", "Enigma", and "Sandino" (about Augusto César Sandino).

=== Career and orchestra ===
Orozco moved back to Colombia and in 1927 became director of a music school. He moved back to Popayán and in 1932 formed his own orchestra, called Efraín Orozco y sus Alegres Muchachos. The ensemble toured Peru and spent three months in Chile before arriving in Buenos Aires, where it remained for 19 years, performing bambucos, pasillos and "costeño musical numbers", which Orozco presented as porros and cumbias, but which, according to Restrepo Duque (1991), were actually "bambucos fiesteros". The ensemble also made several recordings. In the 1940s Orozco renamed his band Efraín Orozco y su Orquesta de las Américas, at the recommendation of his friend Homero Manzi. In 1946 the band recorded a successful version of José María Peñaranda's song "Se Va el Caimán" with an extra verse, under the title "El Caimán". Members of the band included Colombians Carlos Julio Ramírez, Jorge David Monsalve, and Alejandro Tovar, as well as the Argentine pianist Luis Bacalof and singers Leo Marini, Carlos Argentino Torres, and Lita Nelson. Orozco was known in Buenos Aires as the "Maker of Stars" (Spanish: Hacedor de Estrellas) because of the success of the singers that worked with the band.

In 1953 Orozco returned back to Colombia, on contract to the Club San Fernando in Cali, with singer Carlos Argentino Torres. Shortly afterwards he moved to Bogotá, and around that time wrote several successful songs. Orozco wrote the song "El Regreso" about the experience of returning to his hometown Cajibío after being away for so long. The song was first recorded by Beatriz Arellano, with arrangements by Jaime Llano González.

=== Death and legacy ===
Orozco died on 27 August 1975 in Bogotá. The competition "Concurso de Música Andina Colombiana Efraín Orozco Morales" is held in Cajibío in his honour.

== Musical style and compositions ==
Orozco wrote over 200 songs. He is known for his songs in the styles of bambuco, pasillo, and bolero, and his notable compositions include: "Señora María Rosa", "Allá en la Montaña", "Romanza de Amor", "Fogoncito", "Bandolitis", "Comadre Juana Ruperta", "Tenjo", "Diana", "Adiós a Popayán", "Ramón", "Claudia", "Dos Vidas", "Volver", and "El Regreso".
