= List of number-one Billboard Hot Tropical Songs of 2004 =

The Billboard Tropical Songs chart is a music chart that ranks the best-performing tropical songs of the United States. Published by Billboard magazine, the data are compiled by Nielsen Broadcast Data Systems based on each single's weekly airplay.

== Chart history ==
| Issue date | Song | Artist | Ref |
|---|---|---|---|
| January 3 | "Me cansé de ti" | Obie Bermúdez | |
| January 10 | "El Año Viejo" | Celia Cruz | |
| January 17 | "Loca conmigo" | Hector Acosta (singer) & Los Toros Band | |
| January 24 | "Loca conmigo" | Hector Acosta (singer) & Los Toros Band | |
| January 31 | "Loca conmigo" | Hector Acosta (singer) & Los Toros Band | |
| February 7 | "Tengo ganas" | Víctor Manuelle | |
| February 14 | "Tengo ganas" | Víctor Manuelle | |
| February 21 | "Tengo ganas" | Víctor Manuelle | |
| February 28 | "Tengo ganas" | Víctor Manuelle | |
| March 6 | "Tengo ganas" | Víctor Manuelle | |
| March 13 | "Tengo ganas" | Víctor Manuelle | |
| March 20 | "Tengo ganas" | Víctor Manuelle | |
| March 27 | "Tengo ganas" | Víctor Manuelle | |
| April 3 | "Tengo ganas" | Víctor Manuelle | |
| April 10 | "Tengo ganas" | Víctor Manuelle | |
| April 17 | "Tengo ganas" | Víctor Manuelle | |
| April 24 | "Tengo ganas" | Víctor Manuelle | |
| May 1 | "Tengo ganas" | Víctor Manuelle | |
| May 8 | "Hora enamorada" | Elvis Crespo | |
| May 15 | "Creo en el amor" | Rey Ruiz | |
| May 22 | "Creo en el amor" | Rey Ruiz | |
| May 29 | "Creo en el amor" | Rey Ruiz | |
| June 5 | "Creo en el amor" | Rey Ruiz | |
| June 12 | "¿Ahora quién?" | Marc Anthony | |
| June 19 | "¿Ahora quién?" | Marc Anthony | |
| June 26 | "¿Ahora quién?" | Marc Anthony | |
| July 3 | "¿Ahora quién?" | Marc Anthony | |
| July 10 | "¿Ahora quién?" | Marc Anthony | |
| July 17 | "¿Ahora quién?" | Marc Anthony | |
| July 24 | "¿Ahora quién?" | Marc Anthony | |
| July 31 | "¿Ahora quién?" | Marc Anthony | |
| August 7 | "¿Ahora quién?" | Marc Anthony | |
| August 14 | "Sombra loca" | Gilberto Santa Rosa | |
| August 21 | "Fabricando fantasías" | Tito Nieves | |
| August 28 | "Las Avispas" | Juan Luis Guerra 440 | |
| September 4 | "Las Avispas" | Juan Luis Guerra 440 | |
| September 11 | "Las Avispas" | Juan Luis Guerra 440 | |
| September 18 | "Son de amores" | Andy & Lucas | |
| September 25 | "Las Avispas" | Juan Luis Guerra 440 | |
| October 2 | "Las Avispas" | Juan Luis Guerra 440 | |
| October 9 | "Las Avispas" | Juan Luis Guerra 440 | |
| October 16 | "Las Avispas" | Juan Luis Guerra 440 | |
| October 23 | "Las Avispas" | Juan Luis Guerra 440 | |
| October 30 | "Las Avispas" | Juan Luis Guerra 440 | |
| November 6 | "Perdidos" | Monchy & Alexandra | |
| November 13 | "Las Avispas" | Juan Luis Guerra 440 | |
| November 20 | "Perdidos" | Monchy & Alexandra | |
| November 27 | "Perdidos" | Monchy & Alexandra | |
| December 4 | "Perdidos" | Monchy & Alexandra | |
| December 11 | "Perdidos" | Monchy & Alexandra | |
| December 18 | "Perdidos" | Monchy & Alexandra | |
| December 25 | "Perdidos" | Monchy & Alexandra | |

== See also ==
- List of number-one Billboard Hot Tropical Songs of 2005
- List of number-one Billboard Hot Latin Tracks of 2004
- List of number-one Billboard Hot Latin Pop Airplay of 2004
