= Bunde Tolimense =

Song by Los Tolimenses
- Songwriter(s): Alberto Castilla

"Bunde Tolimense" is a Colombian song written by Alberto Castilla in 1914 and popularized in the 1950s with a recording by Los Tolimenses. In 1959, it was adopted as the official anthem of Colombia's Tolima Department.

Viva Music Colombia rated the song No. 15 on its list of the 100 most important Colombian songs of all time. In its list of the 50 best Colombian songs of all time, El Tiempo, Colombia's most widely circulated newspaper, ranked the version of the song by Los Tolimenses at No. 18.
