= San Bernardo, Cundinamarca =

San Bernardo
- Municipality and town
- Flag Coat of arms

- Location of the municipality and town inside Cundinamarca Department of Colombia

- Location in Colombia
- Coordinates: 4°10′44″N 74°25′20″W
- Country: Colombia
- Department: Cundinamarca
- Elevation: 1,600 m (5,200 ft)

Population (Census 2018)
  - Total: 7,417
- Time zone: UTC-5 (Colombia Standard Time)

San Bernardo (Spanish pronunciation: [sam beɾˈnaɾðo]) is a municipality in Colombia, in the department of Cundinamarca. It is 99 km from Bogotá. It is characterized as an agricultural pantry area due to the high fertility of its land and variety of climates. San Bernardo's main products are blackberry and pea, renowned for its excellent quality.

Due to its location on the Andes, the weather conditions are ruled by the altitude and wind coming from Páramo Sumapaz; this affects the municipality with the cooling of some areas, especially at night, providing mild weather in some other high altitude areas.

== History ==
San Bernardo was established July 22, 1910, when Father Mazo celebrated Mass and said the town was founded in honor of the Archbishop of Bogotá, Bernardo Herrera Restrepo; according to him, San Bernardo was blessed that day. The bells of its chapel were donated by General Charles J. Heredia. The first mayor was Miguel Mena. The parish was established by decree of January 29, 1932 Archbishop Ismael Perdomo.

== Mummies ==
The mummies of San Bernardo are located in a mausoleum at the local cemetery. Due to severe floods and the cemetery's relocation in the mid-1950s, hundreds of mummies have been discovered at the old cemetery.

It is unclear what caused the bodies buried at the cemetery to mummify. Many locals believe that a diet rich in a local fruits, such as the chayote (known locally as the guatila), causes this phenomenon. However, scientist refute these beliefs because the clothes of the buries are also preserved. It is believed that the cause of mummification is more likely due to the climate and/or the high altitude of the town's cemetery.

The mausoleum displays approximately 14 mummies. Most are preserved almost completely with skin, hair and even the clothes. The cemetery's Groundskeepers insist that the bodies are not embalmed or treated in any way before being buried. The cause is the micro climate in the tombs, and the fact that the buried bodies wear clothes that protect from fly larvae inside the tombs. The only insects that enter the tombs are from burial flowers, and flies enter on those. The bodies are buried with clothes, which protect the bodies from the larvae, the dry micro climate in the tomb then dries out the bodies. The bodies have arched backs, which is typical of mummies from dry climate, according to forensic specialist in the documentary Udda platser i Världen (2018), season 1, episode 9 of 20.

=== Events and places ===
- Fairs and festivals are held at the end of June and early July;.
- Cerro Paquilo
- Natural caves
- Piedra del Sol: rock in the sidewalk "El Carmen" with prehispanic indigenous petroglyphs.
- The Lajas
- Mirador of Portones
