= Pinillos =

Coordinates: 8°55′N 74°28′W

- Municipality and town
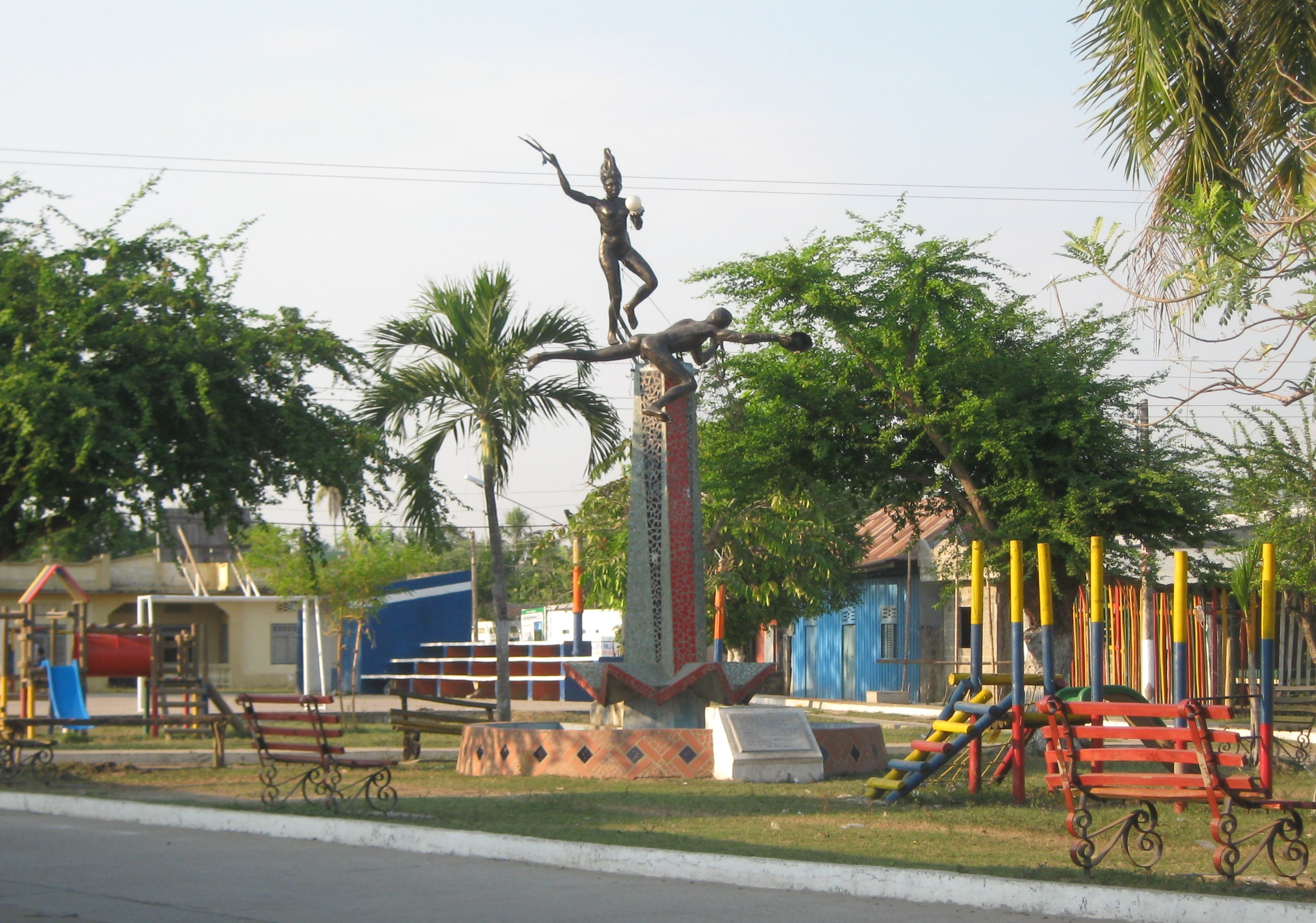

- Flag

- Location of the municipality and town of Pinillos in the Bolívar Department of Colombia
- Country: Colombia
- Department: Bolívar Department

Population (Census 2018)
  - Total: 23,349
- Time zone: UTC-5 (Colombia Standard Time)

Pinillos is a town and municipality located in the Bolívar Department, northern Colombia.

== Climate ==
Climate data for Pinillos, elevation 10 m (33 ft), (1981–2010)
Month	Jan	Feb	Mar	Apr	May	Jun	Jul	Aug	Sep	Oct	Nov	Dec	Year
Mean daily maximum °C (°F)	33.9 (93.0)	34.2 (93.6)	34.4 (93.9)	33.9 (93.0)	33.3 (91.9)	33.5 (92.3)	33.3 (91.9)	33.3 (91.9)	33.3 (91.9)	33.3 (91.9)	32.9 (91.2)	33.4 (92.1)	33.5 (92.3)
Daily mean °C (°F)	28.8 (83.8)	28.9 (84.0)	29.1 (84.4)	28.9 (84.0)	28.7 (83.7)	28.8 (83.8)	28.8 (83.8)	28.7 (83.7)	28.6 (83.5)	28.4 (83.1)	28.4 (83.1)	28.7 (83.7)	28.7 (83.7)
Mean daily minimum °C (°F)	24.1 (75.4)	24.0 (75.2)	24.1 (75.4)	24.0 (75.2)	23.9 (75.0)	24.1 (75.4)	24.2 (75.6)	24.1 (75.4)	23.9 (75.0)	24.3 (75.7)	24.6 (76.3)	24.8 (76.6)	24.2 (75.6)
Average precipitation mm (inches)	25.0 (0.98)	23.6 (0.93)	50.1 (1.97)	113.9 (4.48)	223.4 (8.80)	239.1 (9.41)	229.9 (9.05)	251.0 (9.88)	312.1 (12.29)	326.1 (12.84)	244.8 (9.64)	110.4 (4.35)	2,149.7 (84.63)
Average precipitation days (≥ 1.0 mm)	2	2	3	6	11	10	10	11	13	14	11	6	98
Average relative humidity (%)	77	76	76	76	77	77	77	77	77	78	78	78	77
Source: Instituto de Hidrologia Meteorologia y Estudios Ambientales
