= Víctor Pérez Pérez =

Mexican journalist and murder victim

Victor Pérez Pérez was a Mexican journalist who was murdered in 2014.

== Career ==
Pérez was a writer and editor of the magazine Suceso, which was published irregularly in Ciudad Juarez and focused on political reportage and opinion.

In June 2008, his father, Candelario Pérez Rodríguez, who also worked on the same magazine, was assassinated.

== Murder ==
On September 3, 2014, Pérez was assaulted in his home in Luis Echeverría, a suburb of Ciudad Juarez, by two men who broke in, one of whom shot him at close range. He made it alive to a nearby hospital but died shortly after his arrival there.

He was the seventh journalist to be murdered in Mexico in 2014.
