= Ibagué =

- Municipio
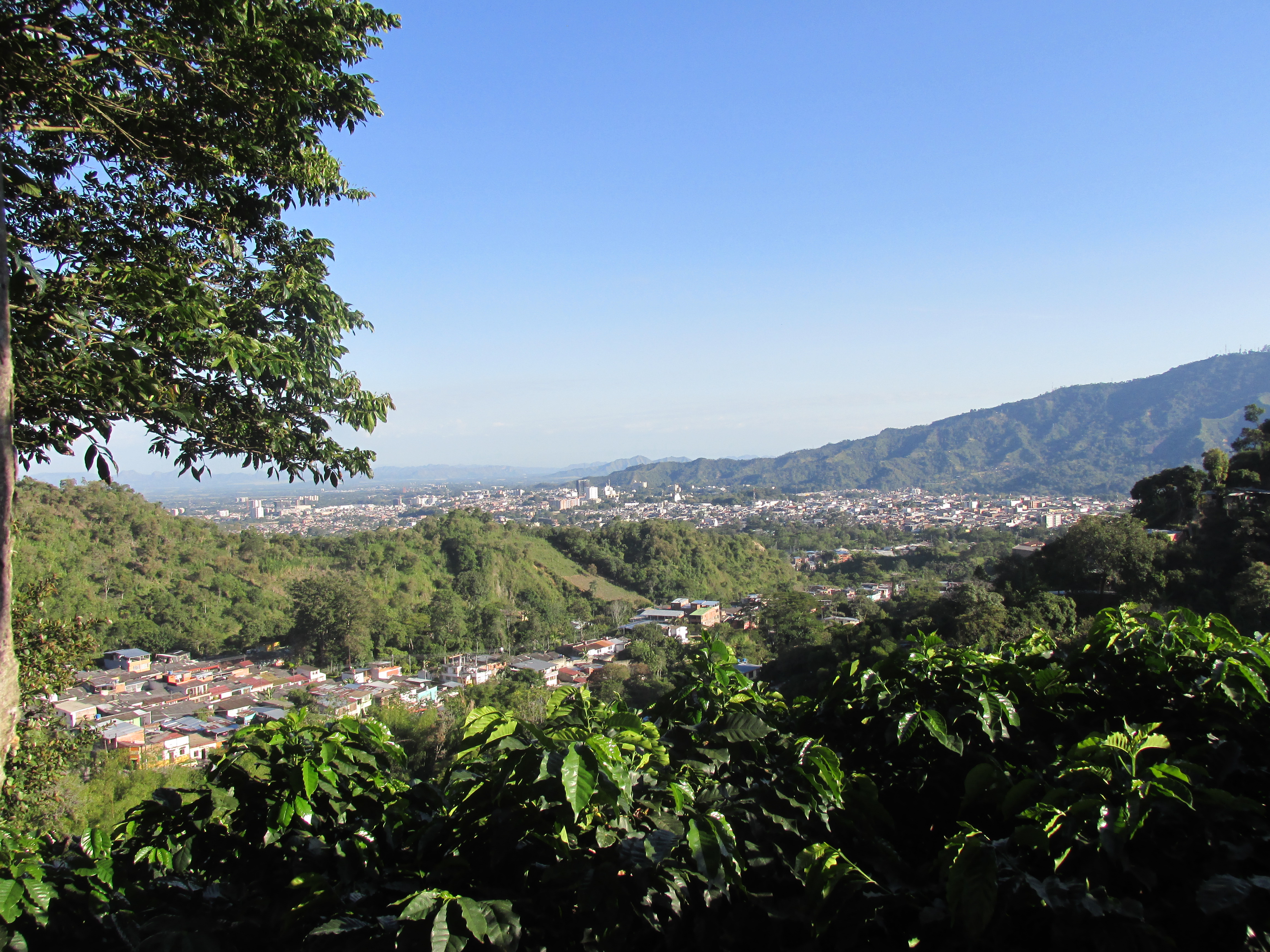
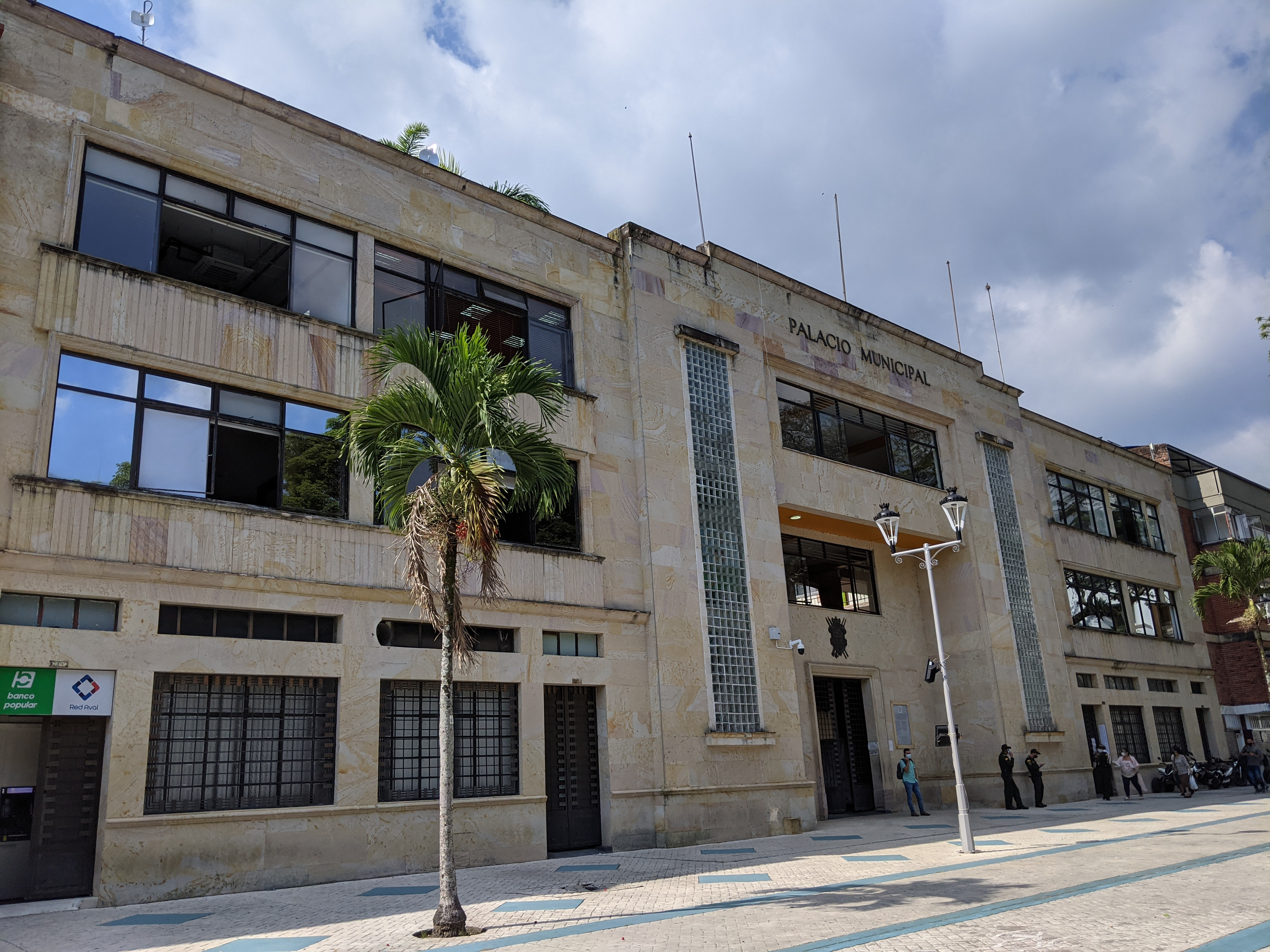
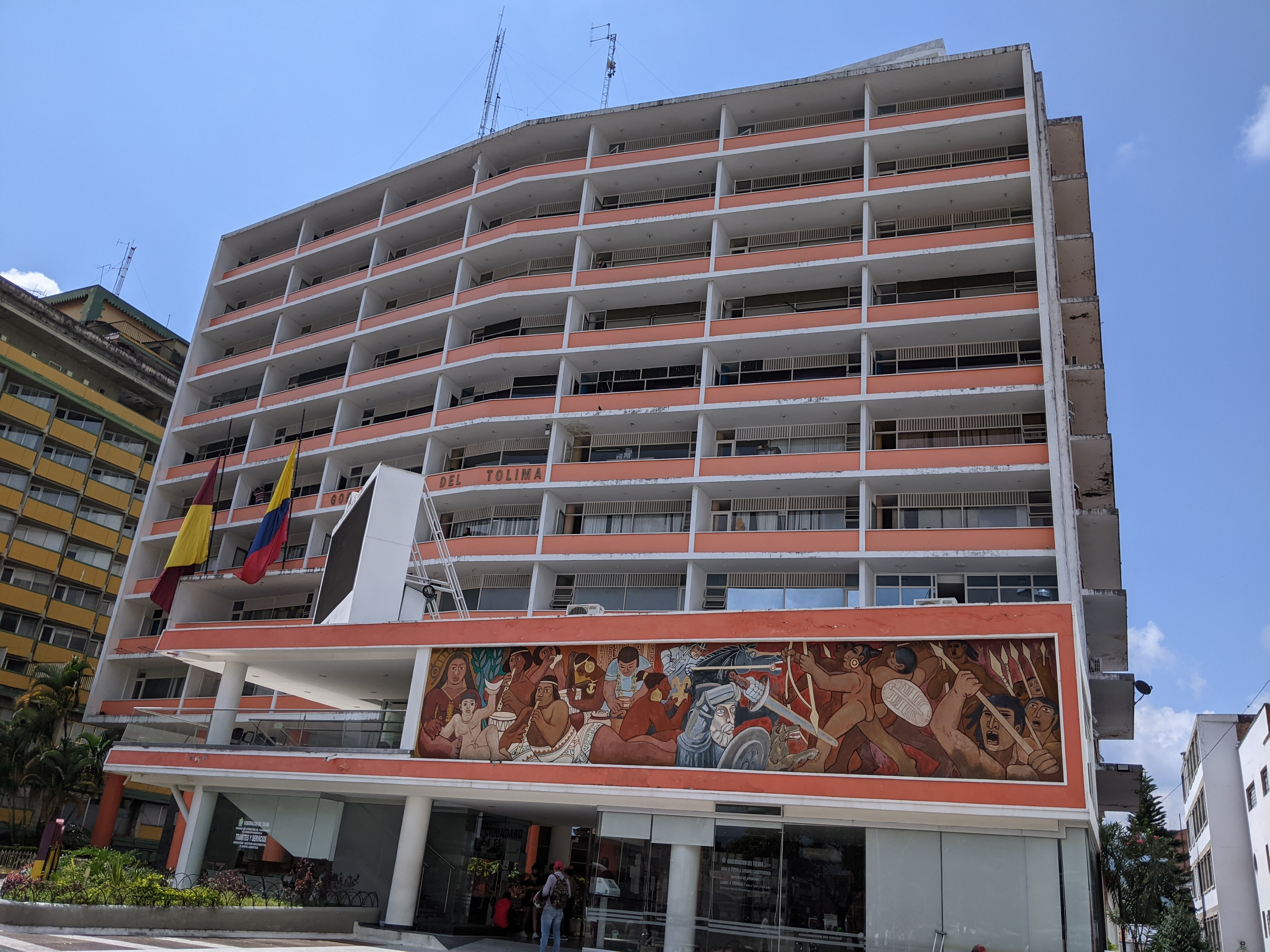
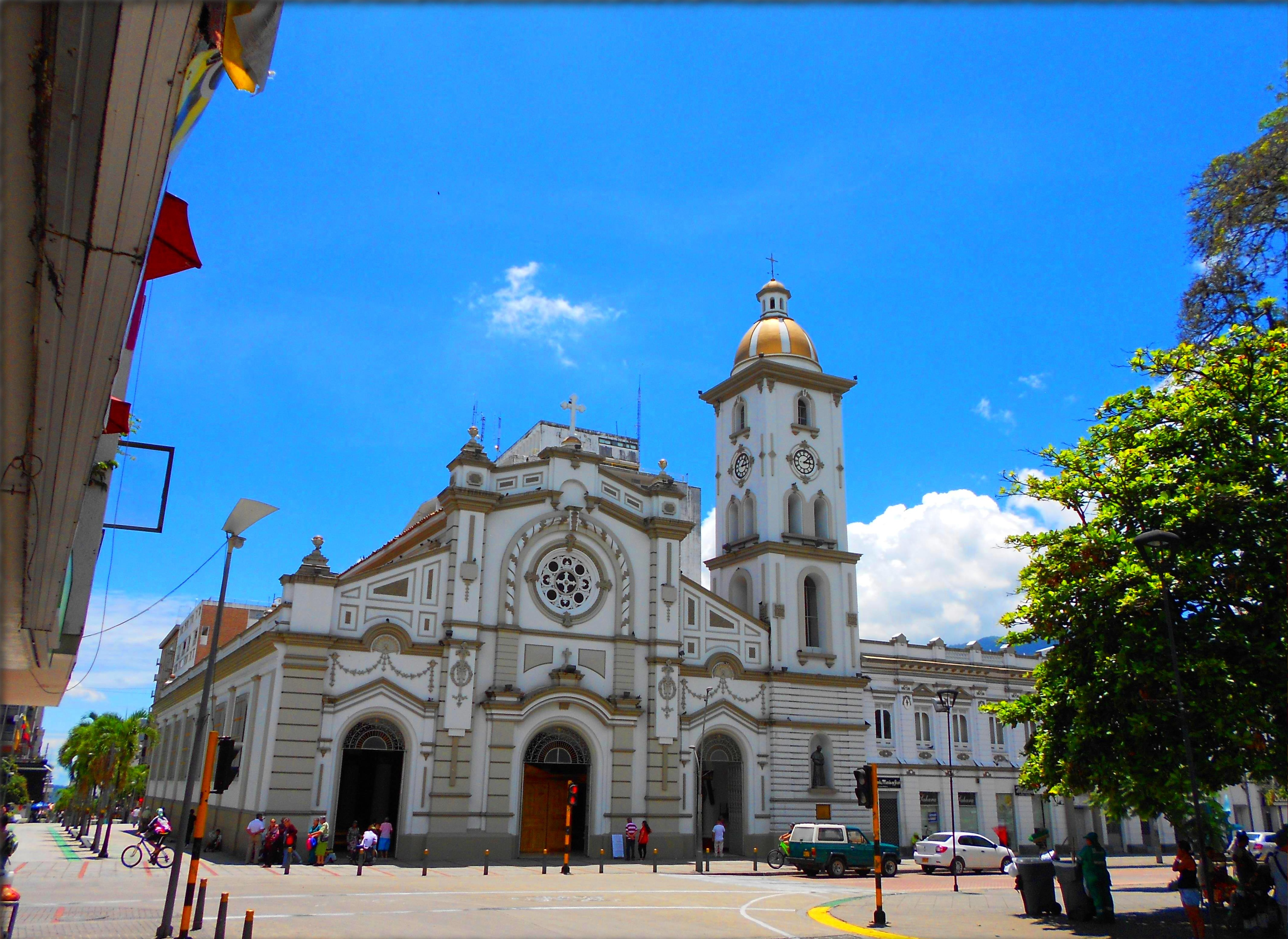
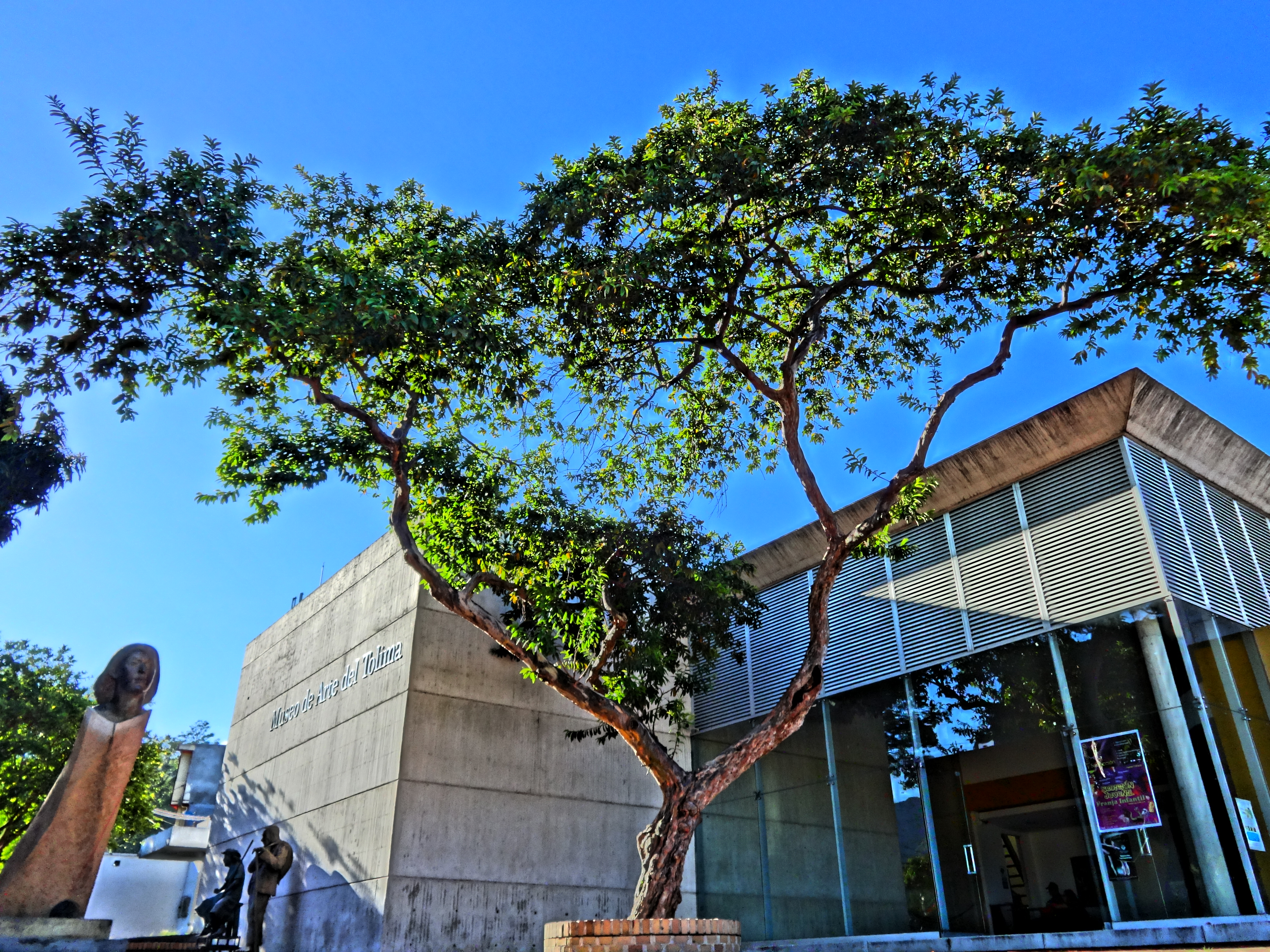
- Panorama of Ibagué Ibagué's city hall Governorate of Tolima Cathedral of Ibagué Art Museum of Tolima

- Flag Coat of arms
- Nickname: Ciudad musical de Colombia (Musical city of Colombia)
- Location of the city of Ibagué in Tolima.

- Location in Colombia
- Coordinates: 4°26′N 75°14′W
- Country: Colombia
- Region: Andean Region
- Department: Tolima
- Foundation: 14 October 1550

Government
  - Mayor: Johana Aranda

Area
  - Municipio: 1,498 km^{2} (578 sq mi)
  - Urban: 47.96 km^{2} (18.52 sq mi)
- Elevation: 1,285 m (4,216 ft)

Population (2018)
  - Municipio: 529,635
  - Rank: 8th in Colombia
  - Urban: 492,554
  - Urban density: 10,270/km^{2} (26,600/sq mi)
  - Rural: 37,081
- Demonym(s): Ibaguereño, ibaguereña
- Time zone: UTC-5 (Eastern Time Zone)
- Postal code: 730001-730019
- Area code: 57 + 8
- Website: ibague.gov.co (in Spanish)

Ibagué (Spanish pronunciation: [iβaˈɣe]) (referred to as San Bonifacio de Ibagué del Valle de las Lanzas during the Spanish period) is the capital of Tolima, one of the 32 departments that make up the Republic of Colombia. The city is located in the center of the country, on the central mountain range of the Colombian Andes, near Nevado del Tolima. It is one of the most populous cities in the country, with a population of 500 thousand people approximately, making it the eleventh most populous in Colombia, and with a population of 544,132 in the municipality. It was founded on 14 October 1550, by the Spanish captain Andrés López de Galarza. The city of Ibagué is divided into 13 communes and the rural area has 17 corregimientos. As the capital of the department of Tolima the city hosts the Government of Tolima, the Departmental Assembly, and the Attorney General's Office. It is the main epicenter of political, economic, administrative, business, art, culture, and tourism activities in the area.

Ibagué was one of three cities in the country chosen by the World Trade Center Association (WTCA) to build headquarters along with Cali, adding to the one existing in Bogotá. The economy of Ibagué is based primarily on the industrial, tourism, and agricultural sectors, with its textile industry being the third largest in Colombia. According to "Doing Business" from the World Bank in Washington DC, Ibagué tops the ranking of the cities with ease of doing business and investment in the country after Manizales. The city is also part of the Colombian coffee growing axis.

The city is known as "The Musical Capital of Colombia and America", thanks to the Conservatory of Tolima (one of the most prestigious and important in Colombia), folklore festivities, and its many monuments referring to music. The city's main educational institutions are the University of Tolima, the University of Ibagué, and the Conservatory of Tolima.

== History ==
Ibagué was founded by Andrés López de Galarza on 14 October 1550, as "Villa de San Bonifacio de Ibagué del Valle de las Lanzas" ("Town of Saint Boniface of Ibagué of the Valley of the Spears") in a nearby location where now lies the urban area of the neighboring municipality of Cajamarca about 42 km (26 miles) to the west of Ibagué's current whereabouts. The indigenous Pijaos commanded by cacique Ibagué were not fond of Spaniards colonizing the area so the city was re-founded in its current location on 7 February 1551.

From April to December 1854, Ibagué was briefly the capital of the New Granada following a coup d'etat promoted by general José María Melo. In 1908, when the department of Tolima was created, Ibagué was designated as its capital. The University of Tolima was founded in 1945, and was raised to state university status in 1954. The city is also the home of the Roman Catholic Archdiocese of Ibagué.

== Geography ==
Ibagué is located in the Colombian Andean region, in the center of the department of Tolima, surrounded by mountains on all sides with the exception of a plateau which extends to the east.

=== Volcanism ===
Ibagué lies within the Andean Volcanic Belt. It has two active volcanoes in its immediate vicinity: the Nevado del Tolima, 28 km (17 mi) NW of the city, and the Cerro Machín, 17 km (11 mi) west of the city center but still within the Municipality of Ibagué. The city is one access point to Los Nevados National Park, the other being Manizales.

Cerro Machín has been dormant for the last 800 years, but seismological activity has been registered recently causing several earthquakes, and in 2007 a 400 meters steam column from the crater. The volcano is classified as "III – Changes in behavior of volcanic activity" by Ingeominas, the Colombian Institute for Geology and Mining. A map of menaced areas has been published indicating that in the event of an eruption the city of Ibagué would not be affected despite its proximity to the volcano.

== Demographics ==
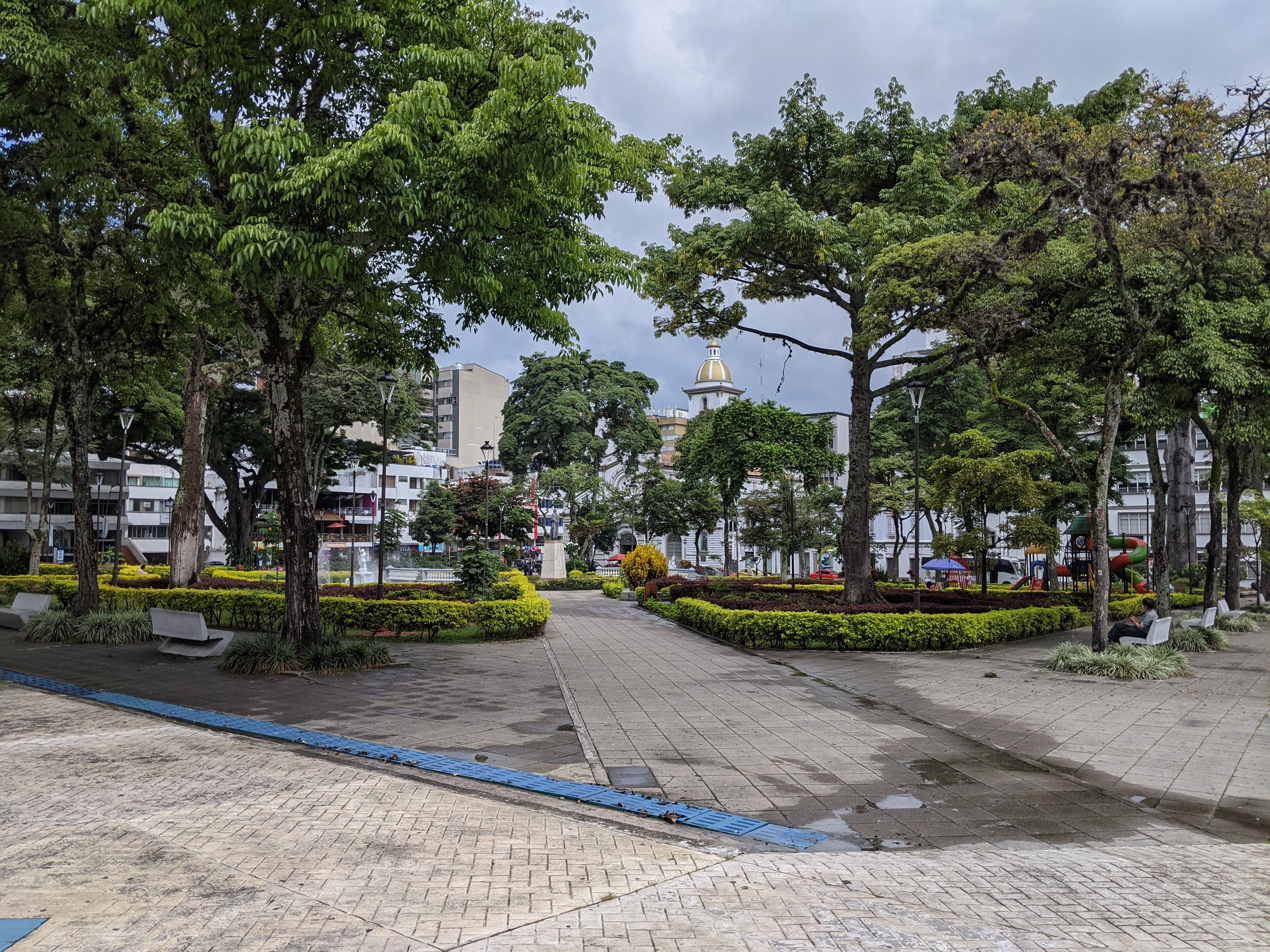
Plaza de Bolívar, the city's main park.

The total population of the municipality of Ibagué (including urban and rural areas), according to the 2025 census, was 544,132 inhabitants, of which approximately 500 thousand people resided in the urban area.

== Infrastructure ==
=== Transportation ===
Municipal transport is managed by several local bus companies that operate minibuses throughout the city and to neighboring villages. Also, there is a public bicycle-sharing system called Ride in Ibagué (Rueda por Ibagué in Spanish).

Ibagué lies at the intersection of national roads 40 and 43, connecting the city to Magdalena River Valley and Bogotá to the east, Armenia and the Valle del Cauca to the west, and Honda to the north. There is a long distance bus terminal with connections to most big cities in Colombia. There are frequent connections to Bogotá, Cali, Medellín, and several overnight buses to Cartagena, Barranquilla, and seasonal services to Santa Marta.

About 10 km (6 mi) east of the city lies Perales Airport which has several flights a day to Bogotá and Medellín.

== Climate ==
Ibagué features a tropical rainforest climate under the Köppen climate classification, albeit a relatively cooler version of the climate due to the high altitude. Although the city does experience noticeably drier conditions during and around the months of January and July, the city has no true dry season month, as all twelve months see on average more than 60 mm (2.4 in) of rain. As is commonplace in areas with this climate, temperatures are relatively consistent throughout the course of the year in Ibagué, with average high temperatures of about 28 °C or 82.4 °F and average low temperatures of about 18 °C or 64.4 °F. On average Ibagué sees 1,700 mm (66.9 in) of rain annually.

Climate data for Ibagué (Chapeton), elevation 1,300 m (4,300 ft), (1971–2000)
Month	Jan	Feb	Mar	Apr	May	Jun	Jul	Aug	Sep	Oct	Nov	Dec	Year
Mean daily maximum °C (°F)	25.7 (78.3)	26.0 (78.8)	25.9 (78.6)	25.4 (77.7)	25.6 (78.1)	25.9 (78.6)	26.5 (79.7)	26.9 (80.4)	26.5 (79.7)	25.4 (77.7)	25.2 (77.4)	25.3 (77.5)	25.8 (78.4)
Daily mean °C (°F)	20.3 (68.5)	20.6 (69.1)	20.9 (69.6)	20.6 (69.1)	20.7 (69.3)	20.8 (69.4)	20.9 (69.6)	21.1 (70.0)	20.9 (69.6)	20.3 (68.5)	20.2 (68.4)	20.2 (68.4)	20.6 (69.1)
Mean daily minimum °C (°F)	15.7 (60.3)	16.1 (61.0)	16.5 (61.7)	16.4 (61.5)	16.5 (61.7)	16.1 (61.0)	15.7 (60.3)	16.0 (60.8)	16.1 (61.0)	16.1 (61.0)	16.1 (61.0)	15.7 (60.3)	16.1 (61.0)
Average precipitation mm (inches)	101.9 (4.01)	114.2 (4.50)	154.4 (6.08)	212.8 (8.38)	249.6 (9.83)	158.8 (6.25)	93.1 (3.67)	111.6 (4.39)	183.2 (7.21)	219.6 (8.65)	212.5 (8.37)	133.7 (5.26)	1,945.4 (76.59)
Average precipitation days	14	14	19	22	22	17	13	13	17	21	22	17	211
Average relative humidity (%)	81	81	82	83	83	79	74	73	77	83	85	83	80
Mean monthly sunshine hours	158.1	124.4	130.2	117.0	145.7	159.0	176.7	170.5	153.0	124.0	126.0	139.5	1,724.1
Mean daily sunshine hours	5.1	4.4	4.2	3.9	4.7	5.3	5.7	5.5	5.1	4.0	4.2	4.5	4.7
Source: Instituto de Hidrologia Meteorologia y Estudios Ambientales

Climate data for Ibagué, Colombia (Perales Airport), elevation 928 m (3,045 ft), (1991–2020)
Month	Jan	Feb	Mar	Apr	May	Jun	Jul	Aug	Sep	Oct	Nov	Dec	Year
Record high °C (°F)	34.4 (93.9)	35.4 (95.7)	34.4 (93.9)	34.2 (93.6)	35.9 (96.6)	33.6 (92.5)	35.0 (95.0)	36.4 (97.5)	36.0 (96.8)	34.8 (94.6)	31.9 (89.4)	34.2 (93.6)	36.4 (97.5)
Mean daily maximum °C (°F)	29.2 (84.6)	29.5 (85.1)	28.9 (84.0)	28.6 (83.5)	28.6 (83.5)	29.2 (84.6)	30.4 (86.7)	31.6 (88.9)	30.8 (87.4)	28.9 (84.0)	27.8 (82.0)	28.4 (83.1)	29.3 (84.7)
Daily mean °C (°F)	23.9 (75.0)	24.3 (75.7)	24.0 (75.2)	23.8 (74.8)	23.8 (74.8)	24.2 (75.6)	24.7 (76.5)	25.4 (77.7)	24.9 (76.8)	23.7 (74.7)	23.1 (73.6)	23.5 (74.3)	24.1 (75.4)
Mean daily minimum °C (°F)	19.2 (66.6)	19.5 (67.1)	19.5 (67.1)	19.4 (66.9)	19.5 (67.1)	19.2 (66.6)	19.2 (66.6)	19.5 (67.1)	19.2 (66.6)	19.1 (66.4)	19.2 (66.6)	19.2 (66.6)	19.3 (66.7)
Record low °C (°F)	15.3 (59.5)	15.2 (59.4)	14.8 (58.6)	15.6 (60.1)	16.2 (61.2)	15.2 (59.4)	15.2 (59.4)	10.6 (51.1)	14.4 (57.9)	16.0 (60.8)	15.2 (59.4)	15.4 (59.7)	10.6 (51.1)
Average precipitation mm (inches)	86.0 (3.39)	105.9 (4.17)	160.3 (6.31)	230.2 (9.06)	220.7 (8.69)	99.1 (3.90)	67.4 (2.65)	60.8 (2.39)	124.7 (4.91)	189.1 (7.44)	173.1 (6.81)	110.5 (4.35)	1,627.7 (64.08)
Average precipitation days (≥ 1 mm)	8.8	9.9	13.3	15.5	14.9	8.5	6.9	5.7	10.3	14.4	14.1	11.1	133.5
Average relative humidity (%)	77	77	79	81	81	77	70	66	72	80	83	81	77
Mean monthly sunshine hours	179.8	144.0	139.5	138.0	155.0	168.0	192.2	195.3	180.0	158.1	141.0	164.3	1,955.2
Mean daily sunshine hours	5.8	5.1	4.5	4.6	5.0	5.6	6.2	6.3	6.0	5.1	4.7	5.3	5.4
Source: Instituto de Hidrologia Meteorologia y Estudios Ambientales (humidity, sun 1971-2010)

Climate data for Ibagué (Perales Hato Opia), elevation 700 m (2,300 ft), (1981–2010)
Month	Jan	Feb	Mar	Apr	May	Jun	Jul	Aug	Sep	Oct	Nov	Dec	Year
Mean daily maximum °C (°F)	30.4 (86.7)	30.5 (86.9)	30.1 (86.2)	29.4 (84.9)	29.2 (84.6)	29.9 (85.8)	31.1 (88.0)	32.4 (90.3)	31.1 (88.0)	29.3 (84.7)	28.9 (84.0)	29.5 (85.1)	30.2 (86.4)
Daily mean °C (°F)	25.3 (77.5)	25.2 (77.4)	25.1 (77.2)	24.7 (76.5)	24.8 (76.6)	25.1 (77.2)	25.7 (78.3)	26.4 (79.5)	25.8 (78.4)	24.8 (76.6)	24.4 (75.9)	24.7 (76.5)	25.2 (77.4)
Mean daily minimum °C (°F)	19.2 (66.6)	19.7 (67.5)	19.9 (67.8)	19.9 (67.8)	19.7 (67.5)	19.6 (67.3)	19.4 (66.9)	19.6 (67.3)	19.5 (67.1)	19.5 (67.1)	19.5 (67.1)	19.5 (67.1)	19.6 (67.3)
Average precipitation mm (inches)	63.0 (2.48)	72.6 (2.86)	115.1 (4.53)	200.7 (7.90)	212.9 (8.38)	92.4 (3.64)	62.5 (2.46)	74.9 (2.95)	152.9 (6.02)	170.9 (6.73)	125.7 (4.95)	78.1 (3.07)	1,421.6 (55.97)
Average precipitation days	8	9	11	16	16	10	8	7	12	16	13	10	136
Average relative humidity (%)	76	77	78	81	81	77	71	69	73	79	81	79	77
Mean monthly sunshine hours	182.9	146.8	142.6	135.0	158.1	171.0	195.3	198.4	174.0	158.1	144.0	170.5	1,976.7
Mean daily sunshine hours	5.9	5.2	4.6	4.5	5.1	5.7	6.3	6.4	5.8	5.1	4.8	5.5	5.4
Source: Instituto de Hidrologia Meteorologia y Estudios Ambientales

== Neighborhoods ==
- Picaleña
- Combeima
- Ricaurte
- Kenedy
- Jordan (I-IX etapa)
- Sta Helena
- Belen
- Pueblo Nuevo
- Galan
- Sta Rita
- Venecia
- Ambala
- Pedregal
- Vergel
- Martires
- Estadio
- La Francia
- San Francisco
- Claret
- Hipodromo
- Las Ferias

== Notable people ==
- Leonor Buenaventura de Valencia, songwriter and poet
- Patricia Caicedo, soprano
- James Cañón, novelist
- Óscar Escandón, boxer
- Estefanía Gómez, actress
- Andres Marin, competitive ice climber
- Darío Ortiz Robledo, artist
- James Rodríguez, footballer
- Gloria Valencia de Castaño, journalist
- Juan Devis, producer and executive

== Sports ==
The Colombian Football Association announced that Ibagué will be one of the venue cities to host the 2016 FIFA Futsal World Cup, although in the end it was not designated as the venue for the sporting event.

Ibague has one professional soccer team Deportes Tolima three times Liga BetPlay winner in 2003, 2018, and 2021. Club Deportes Tolima was founded on 18 December 1954, under the leadership of Manuel Rubio Sánchez, who was in charge of registering the team with Dimayor for the sum of 10,000 pesos. In 1957, one of the most important men in the history of Deportes Tolima, Jorge Guzmán Molina, arrived, achieving the first sub-championship of the team.

== Twin towns – sister cities ==
Ibagué is twinned with:

- Vitoria-Gasteiz, Spain
