= Conservatory of Tolima =

Colombian musical school in Ibagué

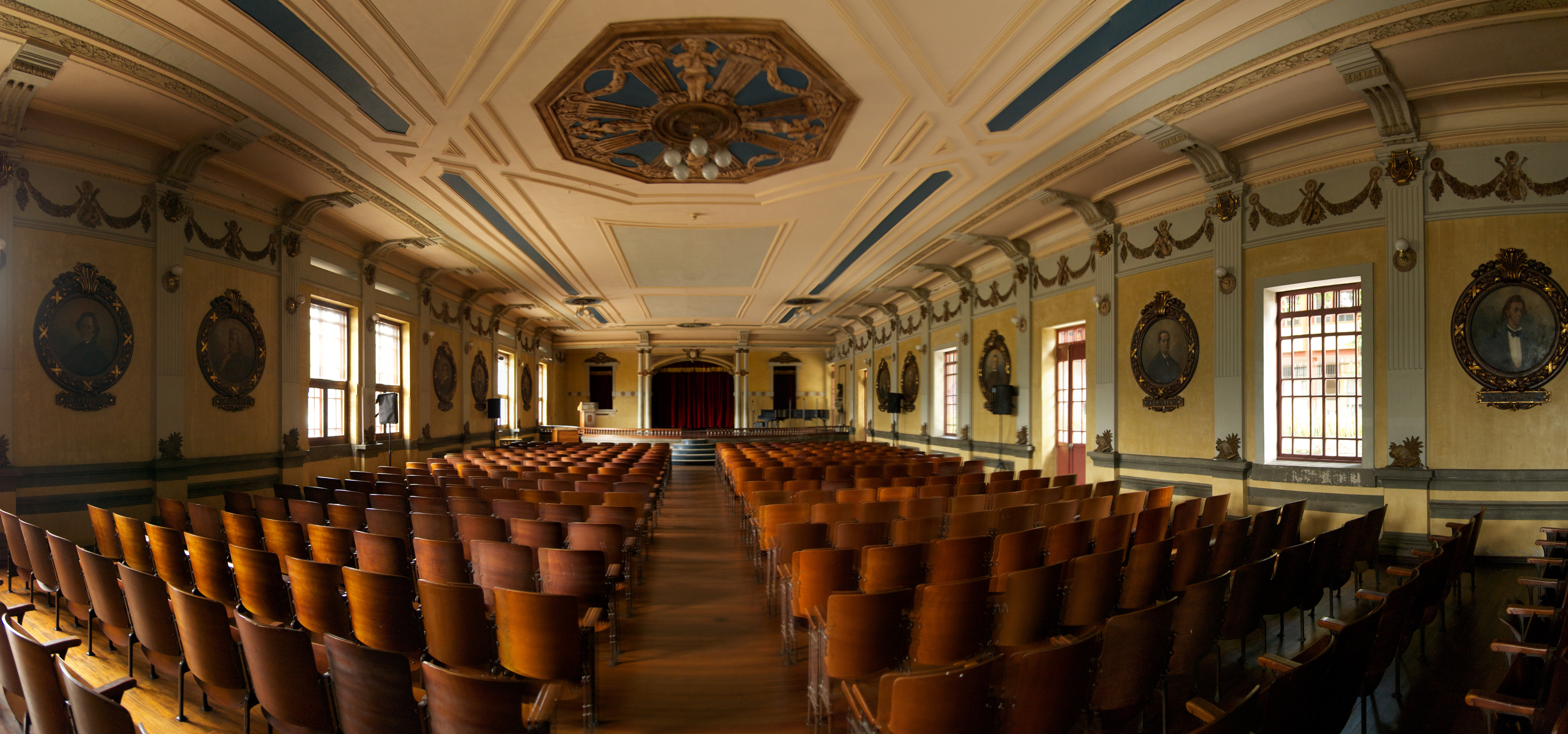
Alberto Castilla Hall.

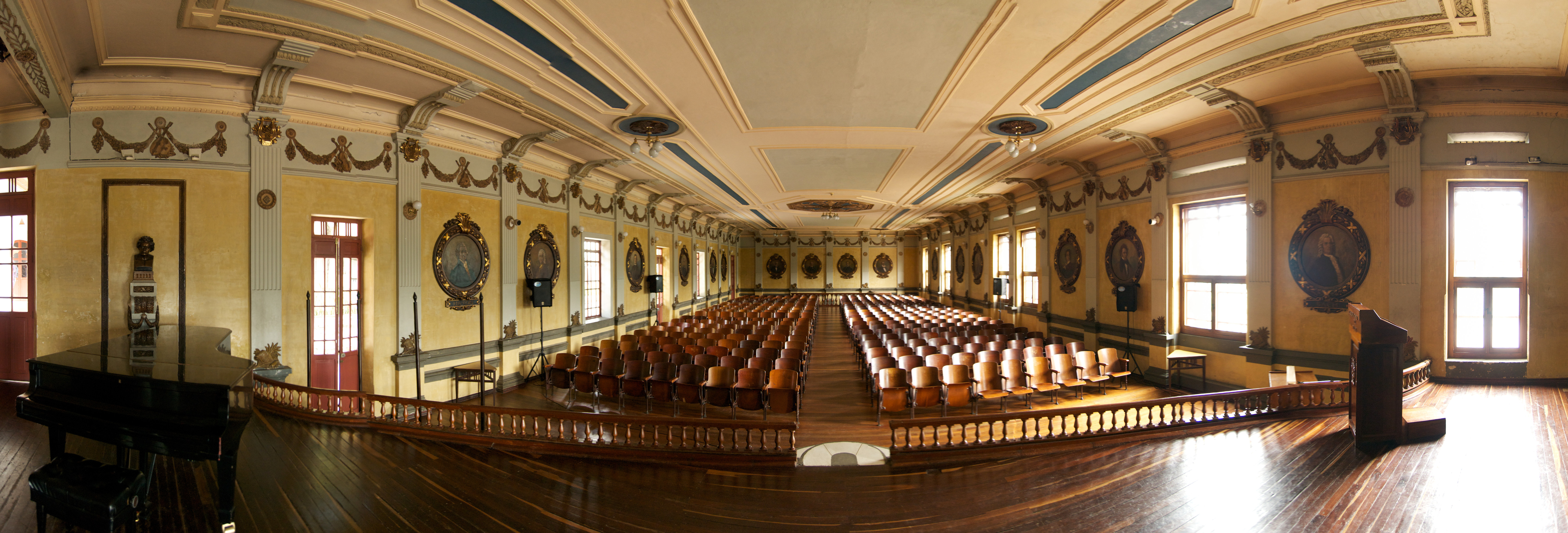
Alberto Castilla Hall.

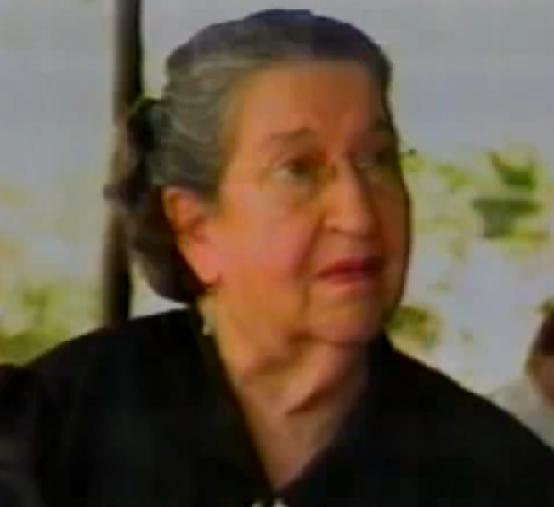
Amina Melendro de Pulecio

The Conservatory of Tolima is one of the most important musical schools in Colombia. Its clearest predecessor was the School of Music for strings and piano founded by the Melendro and Sicard families, which led to the creation of the Colegio San Simón, but its beginnings were in the Academy of Music created by Ordinance No. 22 of 1889 and in the decree of Governor José I. Camacho who, on April 22, 1893, named maestro Temístocles Vargas as its principal.

The Academy suspended operations upon the outbreak of the Thousand Days' War, and reappeared in 1906, around the Orchestra School directed by maestro Alberto Castilla. The historian Héctor Villegas, who for many years was both the principal and a teacher at the institution, attributes the belief that the Conservatory was founded in 1906 to oral tradition, but indicates that no document supports this. Instead he provides the documentation for the date mentioned earlier. Also, in the book "Itinerary of a Feat: History of the Tolima Music Conservatory" by Carlos Orlando Pardo Viña, the earlier date is corroborated by the recording of the fact of the Academy of Music's suspension.

From 1959 until 1998 the Conservatory of Tolima was led by Amina Melendro de Pulecio, who had previously been a piano teacher and vice principal of the school. She also founded the High School of Music, known today as the Conservatory of Ibagué. She was responsible for its conversion to a university of music in 1983. For several years the International Choir Contest was held, based in Ibagué, but attended by choirs from various countries of the Americas and Europe. In 1994 it was declared a National Monument and its Alberto Castilla Hall was named a masterwork of architecture and design.

The Conservatory is currently housed in a Republican style building, with adobe masonry, rammed earth in some parts, wood floors, roofed in clay tile and with false ceilings. It was the seat of the Normal School and of a monastery run by the Community of the Marist Brothers. The Conservatory of Tolima currently offers high level certified education in Music performance, sound production and music performance, among others.
