= Matilde Díaz =

Background information
- Born: Aura Matilde Díaz Martínez; 29 November 1924; San Bernardo, Cundinamarca, Colombia
- Died: 8 March 2002 (aged 77) Colombia
- Genres: Porro; Bolero
- Occupation: Singer

Aura Matilde Díaz Martínez (29 November 1924 – 8 March 2002), known professionally as Matilde Díaz, was a Colombian singer best known for her performances of porro and bolero music. Alongside her husband, composer and bandleader Lucho Bermúdez, she helped popularise Colombian music across Latin America. She was among the first women to perform as a vocalist with a professional orchestra in Colombia and gained international recognition at a time when women's participation in the music industry faced considerable social restrictions.

Diaz claimed to be the first woman to sing for a Colombian orchestra. She died of cancer in Bogotá on 8 March 2002, aged 77. She was posthumously inducted into the International Latin Music Hall of Fame on 10 April 2002, approximately one month after her death.

== Biography ==
Díaz was born in San Bernardo, Cundinamarca, although she always identified herself as being from Icononzo, Tolima, where she spent her childhood. Her musical career began when she formed a singing duo with her sister Elvira. After the family moved to Bogotá, the sisters gained recognition through performances on radio stations such as Radio Mundial, la Voz de Bogotá, and Radio Nacional de Colombia, as well as at the Municipal Theatre. Supported by musicians such as Winston Miranda, they performed traditional Colombian genres, particularly bambucos and pasillos.

After Elvira married and her husband prevented her from continuing her singing career, Matilde began performing as a solo artist. In 1944, she won a singing competition that attracted the attention of composer and bandleader Lucho Bermúdez, who invited her to join his orchestra. At the time, Díaz was married to Alberto Figueroa. Her decision to pursue a professional singing career attracted criticism in Colombia's conservative social environment, particularly because she was a married woman performing publicly. To avoid such criticism, she reportedly presented herself as Mexican rather than Colombian.

In 1945, Díaz travelled to Buenos Aires, where she recorded with Lucho Bermúdez, marking the beginning of an international career that would span approximately two decades.

Following the dissolution of her first marriage, Díaz married Bermúdez. Their marriage lasted 18 years, during which they had a daughter, Gloria María. The couple also formed a successful musical partnership, performing and promoting genres associated with Colombia's and Latinamerican Caribbean region, particularly porro, gaita, cumbia, and bolero. Their performances and recordings contributed to the wider circulation of Colombian popular music throughout Latin America.

Díaz largely retired from professional performing following her third marriage in 1964 to Alberto Lleras Puga, son of former Colombian president Alberto Lleras Camargo and Berta Puga de Lleras. Their marriage attracted considerable attention within Colombia's upper-class social circles, where attitutdes towards women working in the entertainment industry remained conservative. Díaz subsequently limited her public performances to special occasions.

She died of cancer in Bogotá on 8 March 2002.
