= Se Va el Caimán =

"Se va el caimán"

Song
- Genre: Cumbia
- Songwriter(s): José María Peñaranda

"Se va el caimán" (Spanish for "the caiman is going") is a cumbia written by the Colombian songwriter, José María Peñaranda. It was first recorded by the Eduardo Armani orchestra in 1945.

In its list of the 50 best Colombian songs of all time, El Tiempo, Colombia's most widely circulated newspaper, ranked the song at No. 6. Viva Music Colombia rated the song No. 11 on its list of the 100 most important Colombian songs of all time.

The song has been recorded by multiple artists, including Digno Garcia, Orquestra Plateria, Cuarteto Imperial, Pequeña Compañía, Luis Bordón, Rudy Ventura y Su Orquesta, Manolo Avalos Orquesta y Coros, Edmundo Arias y Su Orquesta, Max Woiski, Luis Alberto Del Parana, Chico Hernandez Y Sus Muchachos, Garibaldi, Grupo Raices, Mike Laure, and Billo's Caracas Boys.
