= University of Ibagué =

University in Colombia

Universidad de Ibagué
- Universidad de Ibagué
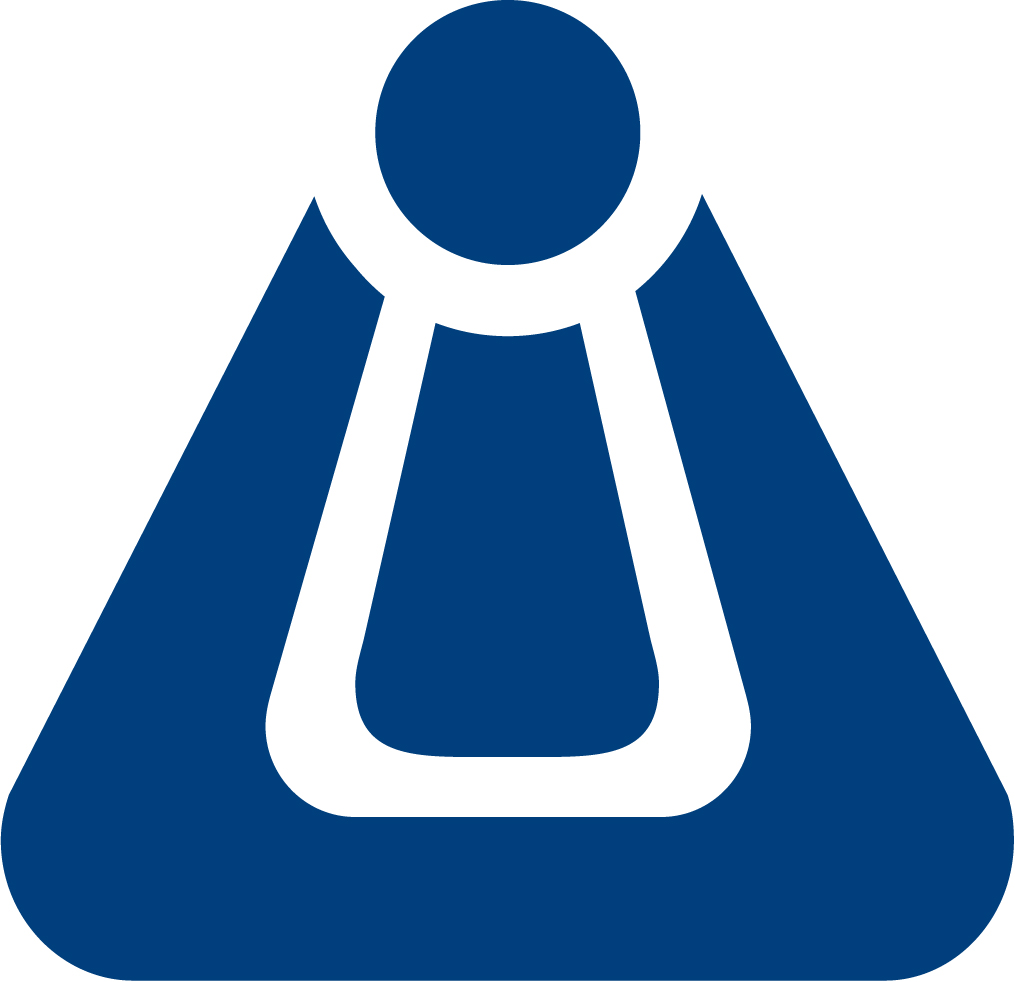
- Former names: Corporación Universitaria de Ibagué, Coruniversitaria
- Motto: Comprometidos con el desarrollo regional (Spanish)
- Motto in English: Committed with regional development
- Type: Private
- Established: 1980
- Academic affiliations: ASCUN; Universia
- President: Alfonso Reyes Alvarado
- Academic staff: 484 (Fall 2014)
- Administrative staff: 482
- Students: 5,024 (Fall 2014)
- Undergraduates: 4,784 (Fall 2014)
- Postgraduates: 240 (Fall 2014)
- Location: Ibagué, Tolima, Colombia; 4°26′54″N 75°11′56″W
- Campus: Urban, 10.25 ha (25.3 acres)
- Colors: Blue & white
- Website: www.unibague.edu.co

The Universidad de Ibagué (Spanish: Universidad de Ibagué) is a private university located in Ibagué, Colombia. It was founded in 1980 as University Corporation of Ibagué (Spanish: Corporación Universitaria de Ibagué, Coruniversitaria) by business and civic leaders from Tolima.
