= Lucho Bermúdez =

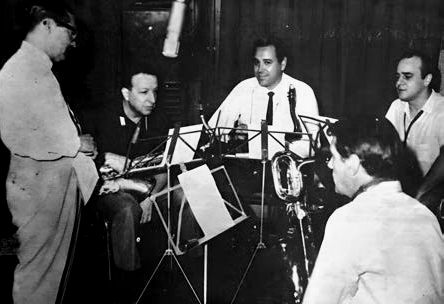
- Lucho Bermúdez with Argentine jazz musicians in Buenos Aires, 1962.

Background information
- Born: Luis Eduardo Bermúdez Acosta; January 25, 1912; Carmen de Bolívar, Bolívar, Colombia
- Died: April 23, 1994 (aged 82) Bogotá, Colombia
- Genres: Cumbia, porro, fandango
- Occupations: Musician; composer; arranger; DJ; director; performer
- Instruments: Brass, woodwind
- Labels: Sonolux; Discos Fuentes; Philips Records; CBS Records International

Luis Eduardo Bermúdez Acosta (January 25 1912 – April 23 1994) better known as Lucho Bermúdez, was a Colombian musician, composer, arranger, director and performer. He is widely regarded as one of the most important fiugres in the 20th-century Colombian popular music. He adapted traditional Colombian musical genres such as cumbia and porro into orchestral arrangements that contributed to their emergence as symbols of Colombian national identity from the 1930s onwards..

Bermúdez's approach has often been described through the expressing "dressing porro in a tailcoat" ("Vestir el porro de frac"), referring to his adaptation of a musical genre traditionally associated with working-class and rural communities into the sophisticated arrangements of big-band orchestras. By incorporating orchestral instrumentation and arrangementes associated with ballroom music, he helped bring porro to middle- and uper-class audiences and facilitated its wider circulation throughout Colombia. His work also gained recognition across Latin America. His compositions and arrangements drew heavily on the porros and fandangos of the savanna region of Bolívar and the Caribbean coastal towns of northern Colombia. He also acknowledged the influence of musicians and composers such as Pedro Biava, Ernesto Lecuona and Rafael Hernández on his work.

== Early years ==
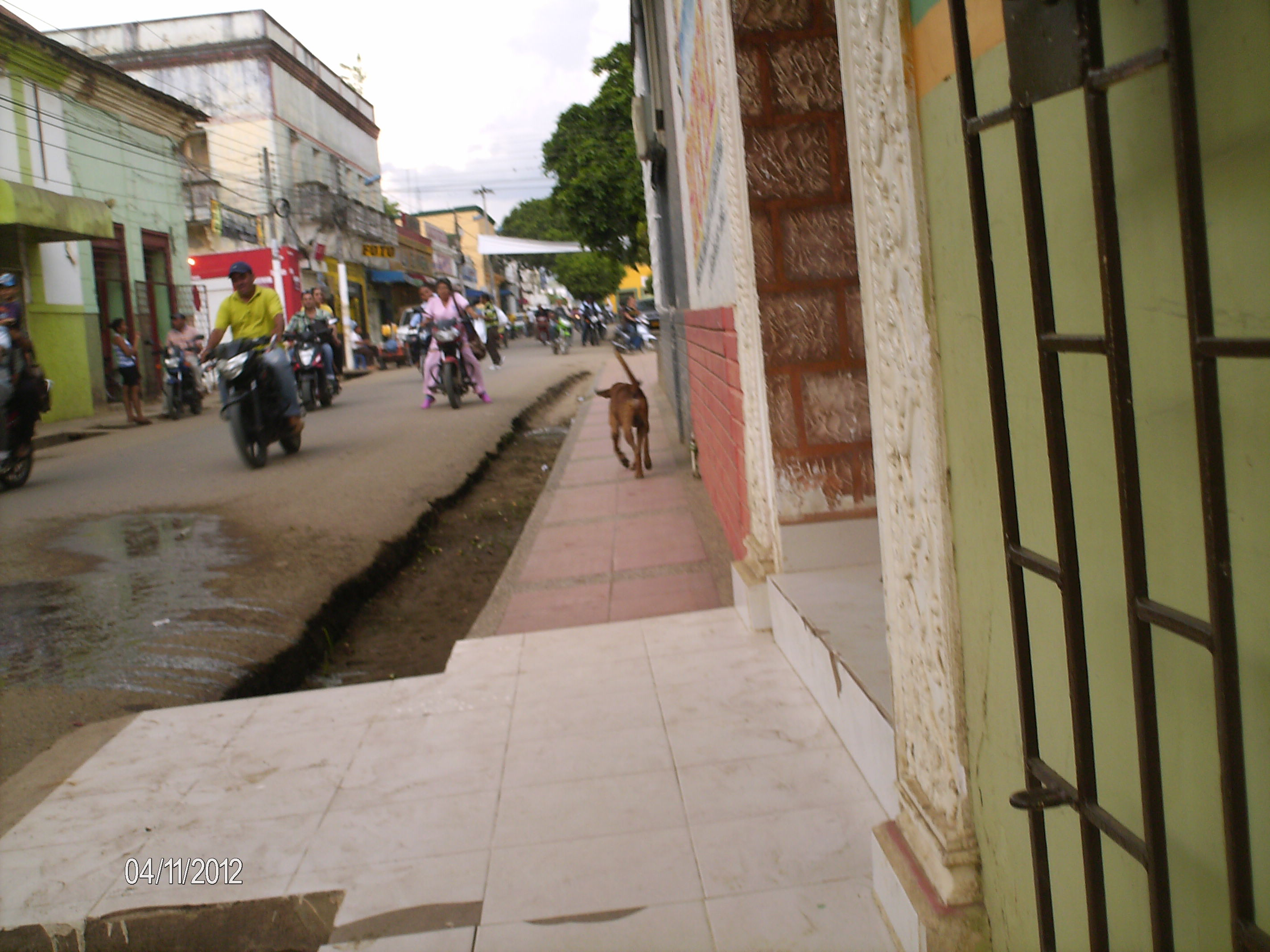
El Carmen de Bolívar, where Bermúdez grew up

Bermúdez's father died when he was two years old after falling into a ravine, forcing his mother to support the family (including his sister Helena) with limited resources. At four years old, he learned to play the piccolo from his uncle Montes, who, upon discovering the boy's interest and abilities, encouraged him to become a musician. During his childhood, he lived in El Carmen de Bolívar. In a military band, he later learned to play the trombone, tuba, trumpet, saxophone and clarinet.

Bermúdez dedicated himself to learning the rhythms of Colombian Caribbean music, and adapting them to suit an orchestra; in the town of María La Baja he discovered how cumbia was organized by the black community. Seeing a girl named María Isabel dancing barefoot on the sand, he had the inspiration for his first hit, "Prende la Vela." He became musical director for the A Numero uno de Cartagena orchestra, and later the Orquesta del Caribe, in which he played many of his compositions and completed his first recordings, including "Marbella," "Cartagenerita," "Joselito Carnaval" and "Borrachera."

== Orchestral career ==
Thanks to the success of "Prende la Vela," he was invited in 1943 to play for a season at the El Metropolitan nightclub in Bogotá. In 1946, he made his first international trip to Buenos Aires, Argentina, on a six-month contract. There, he formed an orchestra of 22 musicians (including Eduardo Armani and Eugenio Nóbile), with whom he recorded around 60 songs for record company RCA Víctor, as "Danza Negra", "Caprichito", "Cuca", "Cumbia Colombiana" y "El Porro Buenos Aires".

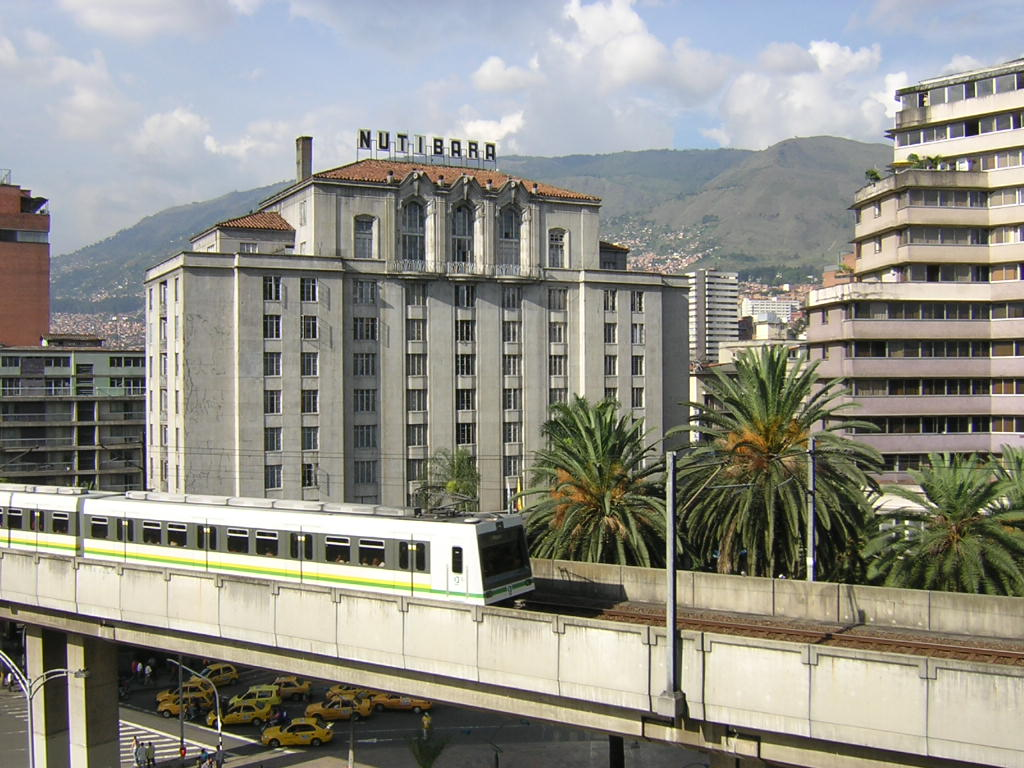
The Hotel Nutibara

After returning to Colombia, he and his orchestra were hired to play at the Hotel Granada in the heart of the city of Bogotá. Bermúdez officially presented the Lucho Bermúdez Orchestra on July 15, 1947 at the Hotel Granada, initiating an intense agenda of presentations, tours and recordings that would last his entire life. In 1948, he moved to Medellín where he worked as a staff at the Hotel Nutibara, and at the Campestre Club. During this time, he also served as musical artistic director of the radio station "La Voz de Antioquia". In Medellín, he associated with Pedro Vargas, Eva Garza, Miguelito Valdés, Avelina García and Toña La Negra among others. Medellín became the most important record venue in the country. There, he recorded the song "Salsipuedes" that turned him into a true popular idol. In all, he spent 15 years in Medellín.

In 1952, he was invited to participate in the Festival of Latin American Music in Havana, Cuba, organized by composer Ernesto Lecuona. In Cuba he recorded four songs with RCA Víctor, directed the Orquesta de Bebo Valdés for the radio and Lecuona's orchestra for television. Between 1952 and 1954, Bermúdez lived in Cuba and Mexico with his orchestra; promoting his music internationally. In Mexico, he met Dámaso Pérez Prado, Celia Cruz and Beny Moré. Upon his return to Colombia, he was invited to participate in the first ever broadcasts on Colombian television on June 13, 1954.

Back in his home country, he recorded around 80 albums. Furthermore, he performed in many major US cities, including New York, Los Angeles, Miami, San Francisco, Las Vegas, Washington and Texas. Bermúdez also performed in Venezuela, Costa Rica and Ecuador. Many artists have been inspired by his music, including Hugo Romani, Leo Marini, Gregorio Barrios, Bienvenido Granda, Jaime Llano González, Leonor González Mina, Carmiña Gallo, Sonora Matancera, Benny Moré, Pacho Galán, Juanes, Tego Calderón, Billo's Caracas Boys, Melodicos Tito Rodríguez and Juan Gariel, among others.

== Family and death ==
Bermúdez's first marriage was to Leda Montes, with whom he had a son named Luis Eduardo Antonio. Later, he married Matilde Díaz with whom he had a daughter named Gloria María. His final marriage was to Elba Gallo Pardo, with whom he had two sons, Elba Patricia and Luis Enrique.

Bermúdez died from kidney and heart problems on April 23, 1994, aged 82.

== Selected compositions ==
- Año nuevo
- Buenos Aires
- Fantasía Tropical
- Embelezo
- Borrachera
- Bolombolo
- Burrucua
- Caprichito
- Cachito
- Carmen de Bolivar
- Colombia Tierra Querida
- Coqueteando
- Doble Cero
- Fiesta Naval
- Salsipuedes
- Tolu
- Fiesta de negritos
- Gaita de las flores
- Gammin
- Gloria Maria
- La buchaca
- Los Primos Sanchez
- Minarete
- Porro operatico
- Pata cumbia
- Prende la vela
- Roberto Mendez
- Sabrocita
- San Fernando
- San Andres
- Te busco

== Awards ==
Caracol Radio awarded him their "Caracol de Oro" award.
