= Eduardo Armani =

Argentine musician (b. 1898, d. 1970)

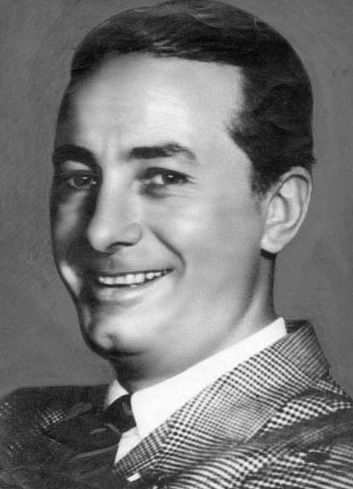

Background information
- Born: 22 August 1898; La Boca, Buenos Aires, Argentina
- Died: 13 December 1970 (aged 72)
- Occupations: musician, conductor, arranger, composer

Eduardo Armani (22 August 1898 – 13 December 1970) was an Argentine violinist and conductor.

== Biography ==
He studied music at the Conservatorio Santa Cecilia (in Buenos Aires) with teachers Cayetano Troiani and Hércules Galvani, finishing his studies at the age of 15.

He began performing with prominent classical music figures such as Juan José Castro, Luis Gianneo, Julio Perceval, José María Castro, Washington Castro, and Ennio Bolognini. In 1919 he performed as solo violin during the performances of the dancer Isadora Duncan, at the Teatro Opera (in Buenos Aires). He repeated the following year accompanying Ana Pavlova at the Teatro Coliseo, which earned him a contract to perform in Brazil, Puerto Rico, Uruguay, and Venezuela.

In 1921 he conducted the French orchestra of Madame Rasimi's Revue Company, at the Opera theater. He repeated in 1922 with the Folies Bergère, in 1923 with the Moulin Rouge and in 1924 with the Casino de Paris. In 1922 he joined the country's first symphony orchestra, performing until 1929.

Since 1925 he has participated in the radio broadcast of classical music on Radio Cultura, Radio Fénix and Radio Municipal. It was led by famous Baturas like Ernesto Ansermet and Arthur Rubinstein This interpreter of classical music, he alternated this task with the execution of tango in the orchestras of Juan Carlos Cobián and Francisco Lomuto. He composed several tangos such as Normiña, No olvidarás, Un capricho.

In 1928 he began to cultivate jazz, joining the pianist René Cóspito, creating the Jazz Cóspito Armani. He stayed for five years, during which time he recorded albums for the RCA Victor label.

In 1933 he became independent creating his own jazz orchestra with which he stood out on Radio El Mundo and in presentations in the Federal Capital, in the El Águila coffee shop on the Rambla in Mar del Plata, and in Montevideo. His orchestra animated the parties at the meetings of the Porteña Society, as well as his presentations on transatlantic ships and clubs.

Among the members of his 25-piece orchestra was the singer Eduardo Farrell, who in 1954 performed the song "Vidita". Farrell left the orchestra together with the pianist Dante Amicarelli to form the Amicarelli-Farrell orchestra, of great musical quality but a commercial failure. Other musicians in his orchestra were the pianist and saxophonist Jose Tieri, the singer Jorge David Monsalve (who recorded the song El vendor de cocos, representing the joy of the Colombian Caribbean), and the accordionist and pianist Dionisio Gaitán (who would emigrate to Cuba, where he would adopt the pseudonym Eddy Gaytán and be director of the EGREM label).

Following Colombian composer Lucho Bermúdez visit to Argentina, he and Eugenio Nóbile, recorded several Colombian songs, including "Marbella", "La buchaca", "Borrachera", among others.

It was brought to the big screen during the golden age of Argentine cinema by directors such as Eduardo Morera, Manuel Romero, and Luis José Moglia Barth.

He was responsible for bringing the actress, director, and producer Blackie closer to black music, taking her to sing with his orchestra at the Teatro Colón.

He shared many dances with his dear friend, Osvaldo Fresedo, his partner in the Rende Vouz nightclub. His orchestra was famous as he accompanied renowned international artists who visited Argentina such as Bing Crosby, Maurice Chevalier, and Frankie Laine.

He participated in the inauguration of the Ópera cinema theater performing Rapsodia en azul by George Gershwin.

Together with the composer and journalist Roberto Gil on the song "Migajas" from 1962. He worked until 1963.

== Filmography ==
Eduardo Armani in the movie Así es el tango (1937).

As an interpreter:

- 1937: Así es el tango, with Olinda Bozán, Tito Lusiardo, Tita Merello and Luisa Vehil.
- 1942: Come... my heart calls you, along with Elvira Ríos, Tito Lusiardo, Alicia Barrié and Elena Lucena.

As music:

- 1954: Dringue, Castrito y la lámpara de Aladino, headed by comedians Dringue Farías, Carlos Castro and the duo Tincho Zabala - Mariano Bauzá. There he edited his phonographic record with the musical piece of the soundtrack of the film entitled the theme "Aladdin's lamp".

== Interpreted themes ==
Disco Dance in Cartagena:

- "Wow, how are you?"
- "Drunkenness"
- "Snail"
- "The Hawk"
- "The Coconut Seller"
- Kalamari
- "The buchaca"
- "The Pillars"
- "Marbella"
- "Beach, breeze and sea"
- "Play the trumpet Juancho"
- "Play me the trombone."

Tour of the World Disc :

- San Pedro in the spinal cord
- "Villetan"
- "That's how my flat laughs"
- "Women of my Tolima"
- "Across the River"
- Guabina chiquinquireña
- I'm going p' to the jump»
- "Port city"
- "monkeys"
- "If you love me"
- "My beauty"
- "My land"
- "The Bells of Oblivion"
- "To Calvary"
- "Companion Demon"
- "Colombian Girls"
- "Pascual of Vechio"
- "Beware the shark"
