= Porro =

Music genre

- Stylistic origins: Cumbia
- Cultural origins: Caribbean region of Colombia
- Typical instruments: Gaita flute Percussion; Brass instrument

Subgenres
- Porro tapao porro palitiao

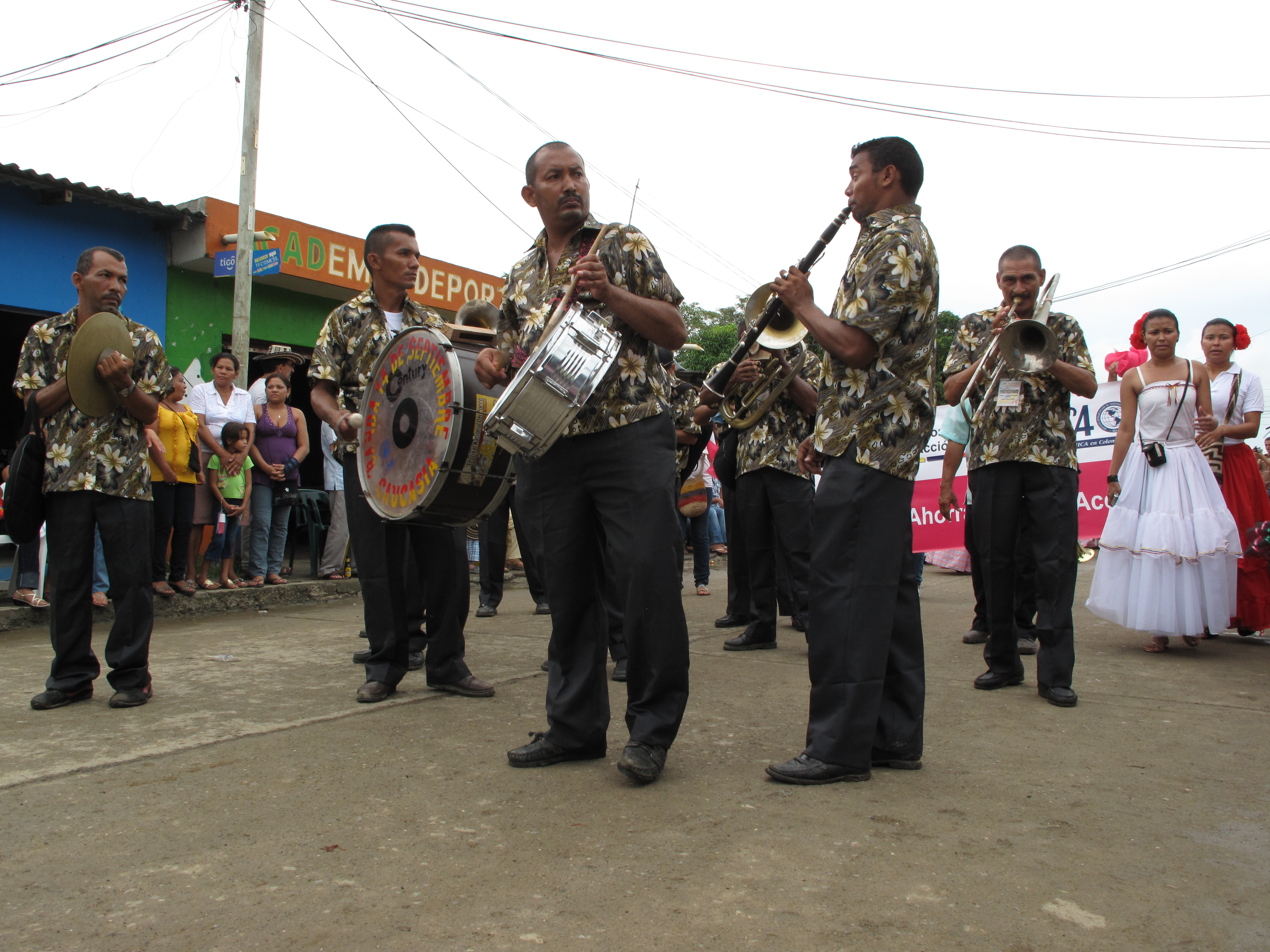
Porro band, Banda 14 de Septiembre, at the San Pelayo Music Festival.

Porro is a musical style and dance from the Caribbean region of Colombia. It is a Colombian cumbia rhythm that developed into its own subgenre. It was originally a folkloric expression from the Sinú River area that evolved into a ballroom dance. It is played mostly by brass bands or orchestras, and danced in couples. This genre influenced some of the greatest Latin American bands of the 1960s, with songs such as "Pachito E'ché" (written by Wolfano Alejandro Tovar García, then interpreted by Benny Moré), "Se Va el Caimán", and "Me voy pa'Cataca" (originally from José María Peñaranda, then interpreted by La Sonora Matancera.)

== Types ==
The two types of folkloric porro are porro palitiao and porro tapao.

=== Porro palitiao ===
The term "palitiao" is derived from the way the bombo drum is struck along its rim to produce the sound of a cowbell. This type of porro is associated with the Sinú River, and its surrounding cities and towns. Some would agree on San Pelayo, Colombia, Córdoba as its place of birth. This is the reason why it can also take the name of porro pelayero. In orchestrated variants, porro palitiao or pelayero is known as gaita. See La Sonora Cordobesa and Pacho Galán for exemplary orro palitiao and gaita music.

=== Porro tapao ===
The porro tapao is associated with the savannas around Cartagena, Colombia. Its birthplace is believed to be the town of El Carmen de Bolívar, Colombia. In orchestrated forms, this type of porro is called porro sabanero. See Lucho Bermúdez or Toto La Momposina for samples of porro sabanero.

== In contemporary culture ==
Today, orchestrated porro has lost the widespread popularity it had during the 1940s-1970s in Colombia. However, since the 1980s in Medellín, Colombia, the genre has seen a revived interest among younger audiences. Dozens of schools in the city specialize in teaching porro moves as well as mambo, pasodoble, tango, and chachachá) where participants learn complex turns to compositions by such artists as Lucho Bermúdez and Pacho Galán.

The Festival del Porro in San Pelayo and the Festival del Porro in Medellín hold ballroom and folkloric dance competitions.

== Notable artists ==
- Totó la Momposina
- Wolfano Alejandro Tovar García
- La Combo d'Lido
- Lucho Bermúdez y su Orquesta
- Orquesta Sonoritmo
- Orquesta Manuel J. Posada
- Jesús Nuncira Machado
- Pacho Galán
- José María Peñaranda
- Mario Gareña
- Pedro Laza y sus Pelayeros
- Tarry Garcés
