= Emyl Rusev =

Colombian singer and songwriter

- Born: Emil Rousseff; 22 April 2003 (age 23); Medellín, Colombia
- Genre: Pop
- Occupations: Singer, songwriter
- Years active: 2023–present

Emyl Rusev (born Emil Rousseff; 22 April 2003) is a Colombian singer and songwriter from Medellín. He is known for his pop music and for incorporating Colombian and Bulgarian influences into his artistic identity.

Rusev gained wider recognition in 2026 following the release of "Así de Rico (Va uno a ver y ve Remizzz)", a collaboration with Colombian artists Juliana and Juan Duque. The song reached number two on the Billboard Colombia Hot 100 and was later associated with celebrations surrounding the Colombia national football team during the 2026 FIFA World Cup.

== Early life ==
Rusev was born in Medellín, Colombia, to a Colombian mother and a Bulgarian father. Both of his parents are musicians; his mother is a singer and his father is a double bassist. According to Rusev, his parents met at a music festival in Cali, Colombia, and music played an important role in their relationship and his upbringing.

Rusev grew up surrounded by music and attended music-oriented educational institutions from an early age. He has described his Colombian and Bulgarian heritage as an important part of his identity and has used the term "EuroPaisa" to describe the combination of his European and Colombian roots.

== Career ==
Rusev developed his career as a singer and songwriter after years of musical training. In August 2023, he appeared on the Colombian public radio station Radiónica, where he discussed his music and his early career. The appearance was his first visit to the station.

Before his wider recognition in 2026, Rusev released music including the singles "Afrodita" and "Poesía Olvidada" and the single "El Enemigo". His later releases included "Pesadilla", "ESTILACHO", "Mil Besos Más" and "Va uno a ver y ve".

Billboard Colombia described Rusev's musical project as combining Colombian traditions, Bulgarian heritage and contemporary pop. The publication reported that he grew up in a musical family and had sought to incorporate elements of Colombian traditional music into his work.

== "Así de Rico (Va uno a ver y ve Remizzz)" ==
In June 2026, Rusev released "Así de Rico (Va uno a ver y ve Remizzz)" with Juliana and Juan Duque. The single was released on 11 June 2026.

The song reached number two on the Billboard Colombia Hot 100 and remained on the chart for several weeks. In the week of 27 July 2026, it was ranked at number 15, with a peak position of number two.

The song received coverage from Colombian media following its release. Caracol Radio reported that the collaboration with Juliana and Juan Duque became popular on TikTok, Instagram and YouTube.

Billboard later included "Así de Rico" at number 23 on its selection of the 30 best Latin songs of 2026 so far. The publication described the song as a collaboration between Rusev, Juliana and Juan Duque that gained popularity during the 2026 FIFA World Cup.

During the 2026 FIFA World Cup, the song became associated with Colombian supporters and celebrations surrounding the national team. Rusev said that the song was not originally conceived as a World Cup anthem but was subsequently adopted by listeners.

Rusev also discussed the song and its impact in an interview with the Canadian-based Spanish-language media outlet ON LATINO.

== Musical style ==
Rusev's music combines contemporary pop with influences from Colombian and Bulgarian musical traditions. He has discussed incorporating elements inspired by Bulgarian traditional music into his compositions and has expressed an interest in combining Colombian folk traditions with contemporary pop.

Billboard Colombia reported that his music incorporates elements associated with Colombian genres including vallenato, bambuco, guabina and pasillo within contemporary pop arrangements.

== Live performances ==
In May 2026, Rusev opened Ed Sheeran's concert in Bogotá during Sheeran's Loop Tour. The performance took place at the Vive Claro venue.

The performance was also covered by Revista Vea, which reported that Rusev performed before Sheeran's concert in Bogotá.

Rusev has described the opportunity to open for Sheeran as an important milestone in his career.

== Discography ==
=== Singles ===
- "Afrodita" (2023)
- "El Enemigo" (2024)
- "Pesadilla" (2025)
- "ESTILACHO" (2025)
- "Va uno a ver y ve" (2026)
- "Mil Besos Más" (2026)
- "Así de Rico (Va uno a ver y ve Remizzz)" (2026), with Juliana and Juan Duque
