= Emilio Murillo =

Colombian musician and composer (1880–1942)

- Also known as: The Apostle of National Music
- Born: Emilio Murillo Chapull; 9 April 1880; Bogotá, Colombia
- Died: 8 August 1942 (aged 62) Bogotá, Colombia

Emilio Murillo Chapull (Note: In this Spanish name, the first or paternal surname is Murillo and the second or maternal family name is Chapull.) (1880–1942) was a Colombian musician and composer. He led the Estudiantina Murillo, composed over 200 songs in various styles, and performed in the United States and Spain. For his public support of Colombian musical genres, he was later known as "the apostle of national music".

== Early life and music career ==
Emilio Murillo Chapull was born to Emilio Murillo and Eloíza Chapull on 9 April 1880 in Bogotá, Colombia. As a young man he was present at some meetings of the Gruta Simbólica, a tertulia in Bogotá. He was initially taught music by Pedro Morales Pino, and then in 1905 entered the National Academy of Music in Bogotá, where he was taught by Honorio Alarcón.

Murillo led a string ensemble called the Estudiantina Murillo, which he founded around 1908. Other members of the band included Ernesto Neira, Jorge Rubiano, Alejandro Wills, Cerbeleón Romero, and Arturo Patiño. The Estudiantina Murillo were very successful in Colombia, and released several records.

Murillo recorded some songs in New York in 1910 and 1917, in various Colombian styles including pasillo and polka, some of which were accompanied by the Lira Antioqueña. In 1929, he represented Colombia at the Festival Hispanoamericano de Música in Seville, alongside Wills y Escobar.

In later life, Murillo was a proponent of Colombian musical genres, particularly música popular, and argued with musicians including Guillermo Uribe Holguín and Gonzalo Vidal about the value of classical music. This earned him the nickname "the apostle of national music". (Spanish: el Apóstol de la Música Nacional). In 1935, Murillo was awarded the Cruz de Boyacá.

== Personal life and death ==
Besides music, Murillo also ran one of the first breweries in Colombia. He was married to María Helena Escobar Larrazábal, who was the sister of musician and composer Gustavo Escobar Larrazábal. They had three children together.

Murillo died on 8 August 1942 in Bogotá.

== Musical style and compositions ==
Murillo composed over 200 songs in a range of styles, including danza, bambuco, torbellino, and pasillo. His most notable songs include "El guatecano", "El trapiche", "Canoíta", and "Margaritas". Some of his compositions had lyrics written by others, including "De lejos" (Federico Rivas Frade), "Canta mis coplas" (Francisco Restrepo Gómez), "Canción de la tarde" (Julio Flórez), "La reina de mis sueños" (Daniel Arias), and "Golondrinas" (José Asunción Silva).

"Coplas del Terruño" by Áñez and Briceño
Murillo's bambuco "Coplas del Terruño", recorded in 1927 by Jorge Áñez and Alcides Briceño

Many of Murillo's compositions were made popular by other performers, including Jorge Áñez, Berenice Chávez, and Garzón y Collazos.
