= Fulgencio García =

Colombian musician and composer

- Born: 10 May 1880; Purificación, Colombia
- Died: 4 March 1945 (aged 64) Bogotá, Colombia

Fulgencio García (10 May 1880 – 4 March 1945) was a Colombian musician and composer. He studied bandola in Bogotá under Pedro Morales Pino and is remembered for his instrumental compositions, particularly "La Gata Golosa".

== Biography ==
García was born on 10 May 1880 in Purificación, in the Colombian department of Tolima. At a young age he moved to Bogotá.

In Bogotá García took guitar lessons from Vicente Pizarro, and was taught music by Pedro Morales Pino. He later played in the bands of Morales Pino and Emilio Murillo. García is particularly remembered as a player of bandola, his favourite instrument. He played in the group Estudiantina Bogotá (alongside Arturo Patiño, Alejandro Wills, and Ignacio Afanador) and the conjunto Arpa Nacional, led by Jerónimo Velasco. He also led an estudiantina bearing his own name.

García was married and had three children. He died in Bogotá on 4 March 1945.

== Musical style and compositions ==
García is known for his instrumental compositions in various traditional Colombian styles. His best-known composition is "La Gata Golosa", an instrumental pasillo that he wrote in 1912 and originally titled "Soacha". Other notable compositions of his include:

- bambucos: "Del Mar, la Ola", "Diciembre", "El Vagabundo", "Melancolía", Qué Nos Importa", "Requiebro", "Sobre el Humo", and "Veredita Florida"
- danzas: "Al Galope del Remo se Aleja en las Olas" and "Beatriz"
- pasillos: "Coqueteos", "Mi Negra", "Mística Pastoril", "Rosas de la Tarde", "Vino tinto", and "Zepelín"
- waltzes: "Nieblas"
- gavottes: "Luna de Miel"
