= La Guaneña =

Song
- Genre: Bambuco
- Songwriter(s): Nicanor Díaz

"La Guaneña" is a Colombian song in the bambuco genre. The song is attributed to Nicanor Díaz. In its list of the 50 best Colombian songs of all time, El Tiempo, Colombia's most widely circulated newspaper, ranked it No. 1 as the best Colombian song of all time and called it the first bambuco.

La Guaneña has been recorded by many artists including the following:

- Chimizapagua
- Don Medardo y sus Players
- Génesis
- Los Sabandeños
- Eddy Martínez
- Lisandro Meza
- Julio Atahualpa Poalasín
- Oriol Rangel
