= Festival Folclórico y Reinado Nacional del Bambuco =

Bambuco Pageant and Folkloric Festival Festival Folclórico y Reinado Nacional del Bambuco
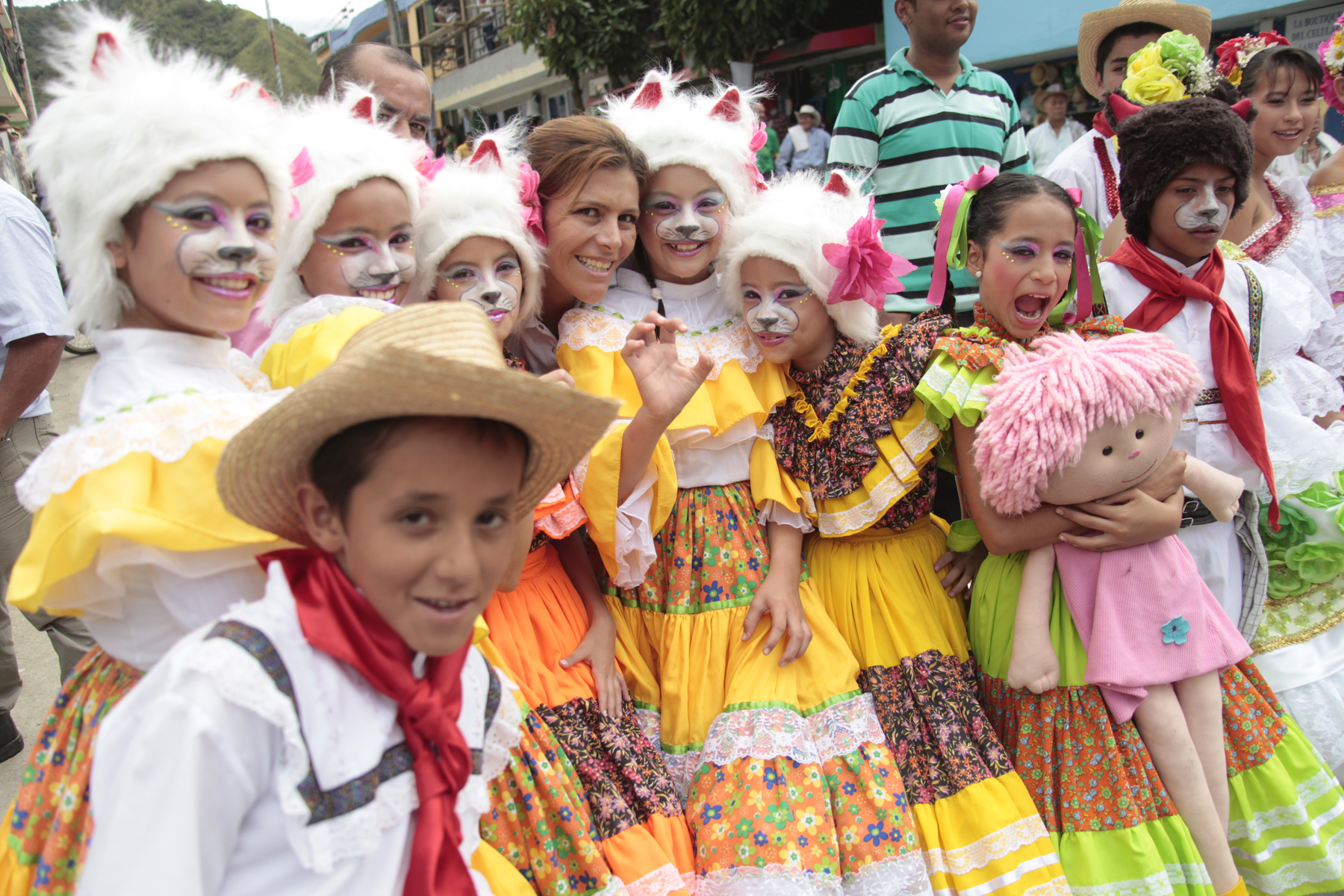
- Woman wearing the festival's traditional outfit.
- Official name: Festival Folclórico, Reinado Nacional del Bambuco y muestra Internacional del Folclor
- Observed by: People from Huila
- Type: Catholic, Cultural
- Significance: Feast of Saint Peter and Saint John.
- Celebrations: Parades, parties, music festival, pageant
- Date: last weeks of June
- Duration: 1 or 2 weeks
- Frequency: annual
- Related to: Carnival, Bambuco

The "Festival del Bambuco en San Juan y San Pedro", formerly called "Festival Folclórico y Reinado Nacional del Bambuco" or Bambuco Pageant and Folkloric Festival in English, is the largest and most important celebration in Huila Department and one of the most important celebrations in southern Colombia. It is celebrated annually in the city of Neiva during the Feast of Saints Peter and Paul and attracts a considerable number of Colombian and foreign tourists. The festival was declared National Cultural heritage by the Congress of Colombia in 2006.

The Festivity is formed by three events, the Folkloric Festival, the Bambuco Pageant and the International Folklore Exposition. The Festival celebrates Bambuco music.

== History ==
Since the 18th century, locals celebrated obedience to the Spanish monarch in the months of June and July, as well as the Feast of Saint Peter and Saint John. At the time, Saint John's Feast was a rural festivity while Saint Peter's was celebrated in the cities.

In 1960, the festivities were officialized and the Festival Folclórico y Reinado Nacional del Bambuco were established.

== Reinado Nacional del Bambuco ==
The Reinado Nacional del Bambuco is a contest similar to beauty pageants in which contestants, each representing a Colombian Department, are judged on six parameters: Performance of Sanjuanero dance, beauty, general knowledge, popularity, punctuality and performance of regional dance. Of these, the performance of the Sanjuanero dance grants the most points, followed by beauty. The contests' winner is declared as the National Bambuco Queen (Spanish: Reina Nacional del Bambuco). It has been made in 57 uninterrupted editions from 1961 to 2017, the first winning department was Huila while the most recent and current winner of the title is Huila as well. In the 57 editions a total of 21 territorial entities (20 departments and Bogotá) have obtained at least one crown, the department that has won the most is the host department, Huila, with a total of 7 crowns, followed by Atlántico with 6, Meta and Caquetá both with 5 and Valle del Cauca with 4, the information of all the winning departments with their respective years is shown below:

Year	National Bambuco Queen	Department
1961	Luz Cucalón Garcia	Huila
1963	Rocio Cock Jaramillo	Antioquia
1964	Lucy Abuchaibe Ochoa	Atlántico
1965	Maria Cristina Lalinde	Valle del Cauca
1966	Martha Querubin	Bogotá
1967	Myriam Tovar Diaz	Meta
1968	Beatriz Eugenia Fajardo	Atlántico
1969	Maria Eugenia Gomez López	Cauca
1970	Liliana Gomez	Cundinamarca
1971	Luz Teresa Zamora	Tolima
1972	Lucy Abuchaibe Ochoa	Caquetá
1973	Melba Becerra Serrano	Santander
1974	Luz Stella Velandiaa	Bogotá
1975	Luz Marina Gonzalez	Santander
1976	Patricia Abello Marin	Atlántico
1977	Martha Isabel Gomez	Santander
1978	Raquel Garcia	Sucre
1979	Carla Maria Fattoni	Antioquia
1980	Maite Show del Rio	San Andrés, Providencia and Santa Catalina
1981	Silvana Gonzalez Mortelo	Atlántico
1982	Gloria Patricia Farfan	Caquetá
1983	Maria Sther Espinosa	Córdoba
1984	Marixa Fernandez Fernandez	Huila
1985	Liliana Serrano Ochoa	Bolívar
1986	Diana Esperanza Rodriguez	Meta
1987	Sandra Maria Muñoz	Valle del Cauca
1988	Indira Maria Gutierrez	Cesar
1989	Naffy Sther Adarraga	Cesar
1990	Claudia Lorena Muñoz	Valle del Cauca
1991	Adriana Lucia Uribe	Huila
1992	Lina Maria Jaramillo Castaño	Risaralda
1993	Liliana Maria Merlano Valderrama	Atlántico
1994	Linda Abuchive Echavarria	La Guajira
1995	Ana Milena Gomez Henao	Caldas
1996	Liliana Andrea Lozano	Caquetá
1997	Maribel Lopera Sierra	Antioquia
1998	Heidy Johana Moreno	Meta
1999	Gloria Helena Garcia Cruz	Tolima
2000	Alicia Eugenia Bosi Martinez	Bolívar
2001	Larissa Fernanda Calderon Ortiz	Huila
2002	Leidy Sanchez Loaiza	Caquetá
2003	Marta Carolina Mora Acevedo	Atlántico & Barranquilla
2004	Valentina Cuervo Correa	Caldas
2005	Maria del Mar Tovar Gomez	Huila
2006	Dayana Zamara Delgado Contreras	Norte de Santander
2007	Beatriz Pinedo Pavon	La Guajira
2008	Diana Milena Ortiz Rojas	Meta
2009	Shadia Rujana Artunduaga	Huila
2010	Ana María Hernández Romero	Cundinamarca
2011	Zaira Karina Pérez Colina	Arauca
2012	Paola Andrea Novoa	Bogotá
2013	Natalia Andrea Fernández Copete	Meta
2014	Gabriela Garcia Giraldo	Valle del Cauca
2015	Gleidy Paola Joven Losada	Caquetá
2016	Valentina Bonilla Neira	Tolima
2017	Evelyn Tatiana Bello Yara	Huila

== By Department ==
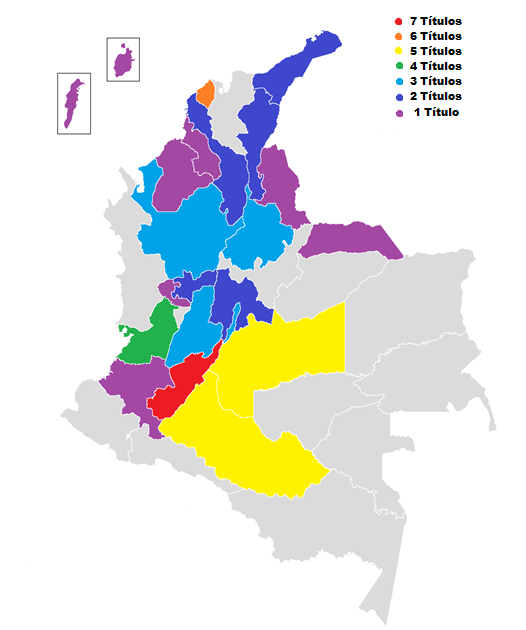
The image shows the number of times a department has won the contest

Department	Wins	Years
Huila	7	1961, 1984, 1991, 2001, 2005, 2009, 2017
Atlántico	6	1964, 1968, 1976, 1981, 1993, 2003
Caquetá	5	1972, 1982, 1996, 2002, 2015
Meta	5	1967, 1986, 1998, 2008, 2013
Valle del Cauca	4	1965, 1987, 1990, 2014
Antioquia	3	1963, 1979, 1997
Tolima	3	1971, 1999, 2016
Bogotá	3	1966, 1974, 2012
Santander	3	1973, 1975, 1977
Cundinamarca	2	1970, 2010
La Guajira	2	1994, 2007
Caldas	2	1995, 2004
Bolívar	2	1985, 2000
Cesar	2	1988, 1989
Arauca	1	2011
Norte de Santander	1	2006
Risaralda	1	1992
Córdoba	1	1983
San Andrés, Providencia and Santa Catalina	1	1980
Sucre	1	1978
Cauca	1	1969

== Festival activities ==
- "Anselmo Durán Plazas" National Music Performing Contest.
- "Jorge Villamil Cordovez" National Music Composition Contest.
- "Inés García de Durán" National and International Dance Encounter.
