= El río de las tumbas =

El río de las tumbas, aka Dead men's river
- Movie poster for "El río de las tumbas"
- Directed by: Julio Luzardo
- Music by: Jorge Villamil, Lucho Bermúdez
- Distributed by: Cine TV Films
- Release date: March 11, 1965
- Running time: 90 minutes
- Country: Colombia
- Language: Spanish

El río de las tumbas, sometimes referred to as Dead Men's River, is a Colombian drama film released in 1965. Directed by Julio Luzardo, it depicted the response of officials in a Colombian town when bodies of murder victims wash up on the riverbank near the town.

== Plot ==
In the opening scene, a group of men in a pickup truck stop on a bridge and throw a man's body into the Magdalena River.

Chocho, a intellectually disabled man, discovers the body on the river bank. He tries to tell the mayor and a police sergeant what he has seen, but they do not listen to him. Chocho tells her sister, Rosa Maria, what he saw, and she asks the mayor to look into it. The sergeant, sent by the mayor, lifts the corpse from the river bank with the help of the town's beggar.

The next day an investigator from the capital of the department arrives to determine the identity of the dead man. No one in the town knows the identity of the dead man, and the investigation ends. Rosa María invites the investigator to stay for a few more days as the town's festival (the Pitaya) is set to begin.

A group, including the mayor, his secretary, the sergeant, and the investigator meet at Rosa María's bar, La Tatacoa. Víctor Manuel, a former guerilla who is dating Rosa Mria, enters the bar and begins to play the guitar. Another man invites Rosa Maria to dance, and Víctor Manuel hits the man, starting a bar fight. Víctor Manuel and others involved in the fight are locked up and fined.

The town beggar discovers the truck that transported the dead man. He listens to its occupants talk about the dead man and the bad luck that he ended up on a shore near the town.

The next morning, Chocho finds another body on the river bank and informs the sergeant. The sergeant pushes the body back into the river so that it becomes someone else's problem. He later buys a bottle of liquor for the beggar in exchange for his silence.

On the day of the festival, a political candidate arrives and gives a speech in the town square. As the festival begins, the people leave the square, leaving the candidate without an audience.

During the festivities, the beggar asks the sergeant for another bottle of liquor but he refuses. The beggar then talks to the investigator about the other body. The investigator becomes enraged and asks the beggar to remain silent so as not to ruin the festival. That night, the beggar again sees the truck that transports the dead. The murderers notice the beggar and approach him.

Meanwhile, in La Tatacoa there is a dance attended by the mayor, the investigator and the candidate's assistant. The investigator says he believes that the first body was a murder. Others do not believe that homicide is possible in such a happy and calm town.

Rosa María talks to Víctor Manuel about her future. Víctor tells Rosa that he has some savings and now they can move to another place. Víctor goes looking for his guitar to play for Rosa María, but on the way he meets the murderers who seem to recognize him, and they shoot him. The only witness to this is the beggar, who has been beaten (perhaps by the murderers), and watches from the shadows.

== Production ==
The film was shot in the town of Villavieja, Huila, Colombia, and in the Tatacoa Desert. It premiered on March 11, 1965.

Principal contributors listed in the film's opening credits included the following:

- Director - Julio Luzardo
- Producer - Hector Echeverri
- Director of photography - Helio Silva
- Music - Jorge Villamil ("Espumas", "La Zanquirrucia", "El Embajador", and "El Barbasco")
- Music - Lucho Bermúdez and his Orchestra with Lucho Garcia and Berenice Chaves ("Matambo")
- Incidental music - Trio Los Islenos (Gaston, Oscar, and Santander)

== Cast ==
Actors listed in the film's opening credits are:

- Santiago Garcia
- Carlos Duplat
- Jorge Andrade Rivera
- Carlos Jose Reyes
- Carlos Perozzo
- Rafael Murillo
- Eduardo Vidal
- Milena Fierro
- Alberto Piedrahita
- Juan Harvey Caycedo
- Pepe Sanchez
- Yamil Omar
- Alejandro Perez Rico
- Hernando Gonzalez
- Carlos J. Sanchez
- Ricardo Moncaleano
- Carlos J. Sanchez Jr.
- Jacinto Castellanos

== Reception ==
The characters are presented in a biting way. The hot climate has put the town's residents and visitors into a soporific condition that makes them indolent. Not even the appearance of corpses shock them, each viewing the violent events with total indifference.

The film brought focus to the Colombian problem in which authorities reject responsibility for the investigation of political crimes. It also began a theme in Colombian cinema treating the Magdalena River as a national cemetery.

In 2016, film critic Jeronimo Rivera-Betancur of El Tiempo rated the film at No. 35 in his list of his favorite Colombian fiction films. It was the oldest film included on the list.
