= Manuel J. Bernal =

Colombian pianist, songwriter, and conductor (1926–2004)

- Born: Manuel José Bernal González; 2 February 1924; La Ceja, Colombia
- Died: 19 May 2004 (aged 80) Bogotá, Colombia
- Years active: 1940s–1980s

Manuel José Bernal González (Note: In this Spanish name, the first or paternal surname is Bernal and the second or maternal family name is González.) (1926–2004), known as Manuel J. Bernal, was a Colombian pianist, organist, songwriter, and conductor. He conducted the in-house orchestra of the Voz de Antioquia, and recorded several albums of his own compositions and those of others. He was described by Radio Nacional de Colombia as "fundamental in the development of the keyboard in Colombian Andean music, both as a pianist and as an organist."

== Life and career ==
Bernal was born on 2 February 1924 in La Ceja in the Colombian department of Antioquia. His parents were Samuel Bernal and María González. As a child he was taught by his father to play piano and organ and to read solfège. As a teenager, he was the organist at the church in Abejorral.

As a young man Bernal went to Bogotá, where he spent two years being taught organ by the Italian Egisto Giovanetti. In 1948, following the Bogotazo, he moved to Medellín, where he was taught by the Italian pianist Luisa Manighetti. In Medellín, Bernal played with the orchestra of the radio station Voz de Antioquia, and when conductor José María Tena died in 1951 he took over the role. During his tenure as conductor the orchestra performed with singers including Celia Cruz, Matilde Díaz, and Pedro Vargas. Around this time he also played accompaniment to the baritone Carlos Julio Ramírez.

In the 1950s, Bernal recorded several albums for the record label Silver, encouraged by Lucho Bermúdez, who was the director at the time. He conducted a performance of Giuseppe Verdi's opera La traviata at the Junín Theater in 1962, which led to an invitation to conduct at the Rio de Janeiro Opera. In 1965 he moved to Bogotá, where he worked as artistic director of the record label Philips and from 1965 to 1971 conducted the orchestra of the radio station Nuevo Mundo (now called Caracol). At Philips, Bernal released three albums of tropical music called Sucesos Bailables. He also worked in television, and appeared regularly on the programmes Los Maestros and El Show de las Estrellas alongside other Colombian musicians like Jaime Llano González and Francisco Zapata.

Bernal twice accompanied Colombian presidents on diplomatic visits in the role of cultural ambassador, first with Alfonso López Michelsen to the United States where he performed at the White House, and later with Julio César Turbay to the Dominican Republic. He retired from music in the 1980s.

== Personal life and death ==
Bernal married Lía Ghelman Wainer in Medellín in 1952, and they had six children. He died on 19 May 2004 in Bogotá.

== Musical style and compositions ==
Bernal's notable compositions include the bambucos "Bodas de plata", "Medio siglo", and "Patria", and the pasillo "Gloria Eugenia". He also recorded tropical music, notably on the three Sucesos Bailables albums that he released on Philips. His album Recuerdo Nupcial on Codiscos comprises recordings of classical music (from composers including Beethoven and Schubert) played on the organ.
