= Jorge Áñez =

Colombian musician, singer, songwriter, and music historian (1892–1952)

- Born: Jorge Áñez Avendaño; 23 April 1892; Bogotá, Colombia
- Died: 22 July 1952 (aged 60) Bogotá, Colombia

Jorge Áñez Avendaño (Note: In this name that follows Hispanic American naming customs, the first or paternal surname is Áñez and the second or maternal family name is Avendaño.) (1892–1952) was a Colombian musician, singer, songwriter, and historian of music. He played in the Lira Colombiana and in various bands in New York, and wrote one of the first books on the musical history of Colombia.

== Early life and education ==
Jorge Áñez Avendaño was born on 23 April 1892 in Bogotá, Colombia, to Helena Avendaño and Julio Áñez. His father was a writer and journalist who compiled the influential poetry collection Parnaso Colombiano. Áñez attended school at the Universidad del Rosario. As a young man, he learned to play tiple, guitar, and bandola.

== Music career ==
"Ingrata" by Áñez and Briceño
1922 recording of Áñez and Alcides Briceño performing the bambuco "Ingrata" by Pedro Morales Pino

Áñez studied music at the National Conservatory in Bogotá, and played in the second iteration of the Lira Colombiana led by Pedro Morales Pino. In 1917 he formed a musical duo with Víctor Justiniano Rosales, and their first performance was at the Teatro Municipal on 17 July 1917. That same month they took a boat to Panama, travelled through central America, and eventually arrived in New York. Áñez wrote about the journey in his book Canciones y Recuerdos. In New York, Áñez and Rosales were joined by Ignacio Afanador; under the name Trío Colombiano they released several records on Columbia Records and RCA Victor.

In 1922, Áñez formed a quartet called the South American Troubadours alongside Alcides Briceño from Panama, Manuel Valdespino from Mexico, and Carlos Molina from Bogotá. They toured in the United States and Canada, and played at the opening of the Orpheum Theatre in Los Angeles in 1926. The Troubadours recorded for RCA Victor for several years, and later for the labels Durium and Brunswick Records. Áñez and Briceño also recorded together for several years as a duo, and from 1929 to 1931 Áñez led his own band, called the Estudiantina Áñez.

Áñez returned to Colomba in 1934. In Bogotá he founded the radio station Ecos del Tequendama, which was later renamed HJCK. He was a founding member of SAYCO, the Colombian copyright collective, in 1946. In the years before his death, Áñez wrote a book of musical history and personal recollection called Canciones y Recuerdos, which Radio Nacional de Colombia described as "one of the first historical books about Colombian popular music". The book was published in 1952, a few months before Áñez died.

== Personal life and death ==
Áñez married his wife Margarita Calvo in the United States, and they had two daughters. He died on 22 July 1952 in Bogotá.

== Musical style and compositions ==
"Ausencia" by Áñez and Rosales
1920 recording of Áñez and Víctor Justiniano Rosales performing his composition "Ausencia"

Áñez wrote songs in traditional Colombian styles including pasillo, guabina, bambuco, and torbellino. His notable songs include "Agachate el sombrerito" and "Los cucaracheros", which he wrote about Bogotá and its people.
