= Soy Colombiano =

Song
- Released: 1945
- Genre: Bambuco
- Songwriter: Rafael Godoy

"Soy Colombiano" is a Colombian song in the bambuco style written by Rafael Godoy. It was first recorded in 1945 by Eduardo Armani and his orchestra.

In its list of the 50 best Colombian songs of all time, El Tiempo, Colombia's most widely circulated newspaper, ranked it at No. 7. Viva Music Colombia also rated the song No. 4 on its list of the 100 most important Colombian songs of all time.

Soy Colombiano has also been recorded by many other artists including Lisandro Meza, Andrés Landero y du Conjunto, Silva y Villalba, Los Escamilla, Los Huayanay, Cantares de Colombia, Alfredo Rolando Ortiz, Beatriz Arellano, Dario Robayo, Hector Alvarez Mejia, Nino Moran, Los Graduados, Hermanos Collazos, Juan Carlos Coronel, Colombia All Stars, Osmar Pérez y los Chiches Vallenatos, Víctor Hugo Ayala, and Garzón y Collazos.
