= Cuatro Preguntas =

Song
- Genre: Bambuco
- Songwriters: Pedro Morales Pino, Eduardo López

"Cuatro Preguntas" (translation "four questions") is a Colombian song in the bambuco genre written by Pedro Morales Pino and Eduardo López.

In its list of the 50 best Colombian songs of all time, El Tiempo, Colombia's most widely circulated newspaper, ranked the version of the song recorded by the group Oi at No. 8. It was also ranked No. 1 by the Colombian magazine Semana on its list of the ten best Colombian songs for broken hearts.

The song has been recorded by multiple artists, including Obdulio y Julian, Espinosa y Bedoya, Los Diplomaticos, Carmiña Gallo, Manuel J. Bernal, Leonor Gonzalez Mina, Cantares de Colombia, Jaime Llano González, Gerardo Arellao, Coros Voces de Colombia, Los Tolimenses, Hector Alvarez Mejia, Trio Los Quechuas, Lucho Ramírez, and Estudiantinas Melodicas De Colombia.
