= Julio Flórez =

Colombian poet and musician (1867–1923)

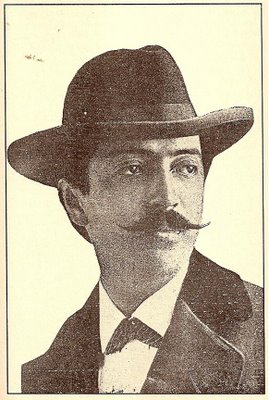
- Born: Julio Flórez Roa; 22 May 1867; Chiquinquirá, Colombia
- Died: 7 February 1923 (aged 55); Usiacurí, Colombia

Julio Flórez Roa (Note: In this Spanish name, the first or paternal surname is Flórez and the second or maternal family name is Roa.) (1867–1923) was a Colombian poet and musician. He published several books of poetry, was a founding member of a tertulia called the Gruta Simbólica, and shortly before his death was named National Poet of Colombia. Flórez's best-known poem "Flores negras", for which he also composed music, was influential in its sentimental style.

== Early life ==
Julio Flórez Roa was born on 22 May 1867 in Chiquinquirá, in the Colombian department of Boyacá. His father Policarpo María Flórez was a doctor, and was liberal president of the Federal State of Boyacá in 1871. His mother Dolores Roa Pinillos was a member of the Colombian Conservative Party. Flórez was the seventh of ten children; he and his brothers were educated at a religious school.

== Poetry career ==
In 1881, Flórez's family moved to Bogotá. He started studying literature at the Colegio del Rosario, but paused his studies soon afterwards. In 1882, Flórez left his parents house and moved in with his brother Leónidas. He spent time in literary circles in Bogotá, and his first public performance was reading a tribute poem at the funeral of the poet Candelario Obeso in 1884. In 1886, a poem of Flórez's was included in the anthology La Lira Nueva, published by José María Rivas Groot.

Following the death of his brother Leonidas in 1887, Flórez left his house and started living alone. He was offered various jobs by the conservative government of the time, but turned them down because of his liberal political convictions. In 1893 Flórez published Horas, his first book of poetry. The title was suggested to him by his friend José Asunción Silva. Asunción Silva committed suicide in 1896, and Flórez read an elegy at his funeral that was "condemned as blasphemous by the Bishop of Bogotá".

In 1900, Flórez helped found a tertulia of poets called the Gruta Simbólica. At the time, a curfew due to the Thousand Days' War was subduing cultural life in Bogotá. Flórez and the other members of the group developed a bad reputation, partly because they would sometimes hold meetings in the Central Cemetery of Bogotá. The Gruta Simbólica disbanded in November 1903. Around this time Flórez wrote his best-known poem, "Flores negras", which "had a significant influence on an entire movement of sentimental expression, both in poetry and music".

Oye: bajo las ruinas de mis pasiones,
en el fondo de ésta alma que ya no alegras,
entre polvo de ensueños y de ilusiones
brotan entumecidas mis flores negras.

Listen: under the ruins of my passions,
at the bottom of this soul that you no longer satisfy,
between dust of dreams and illusions
my black flowers sprout numb.

— first verse of "Flores negras"

Conservative general Rafael Reyes was elected President of Colombia in 1904, and fearing persecution, Flórez left Bogotá in 1905. He travelled via the Colombian Caribbean to Caracas, where he published the book Cardos y lirios. He then went on a "poetry tour" of central America in 1906–1907. In San Salvador in 1906 he published the books Manojo de zarzas and Cesta de lotos. While Flórez was in Mexico, and preparing to return to Colombia, Reyes appointed him "second secretary" to the Colombian embassy in Spain; he went there in 1907, and published Fronda lírica in 1908 and Gotas de ajenjo in 1909.

Flórez returned to Colombia in 1909. On his return he held a poetry recital in Barranquilla, and then went to Usiacurí to visit some hot springs. In Usiacurí, he met Petrona Moreno Nieto, who later became his wife. In 1917, Flórez published the book of poetry De pie los muertos in Medellín. Fronda lírica was republished in Barranquilla in 1922, and Flórez's final book of poetry, Oro y ébano, was published posthumously in 1943. Shortly before his death in 1923, Flórez was named National Poet by the government of Pedro Nel Ospina.

== Music career ==
Aside from being a poet, Flórez was also a musician and composer. He could play tiple, guitar, piano, and violin. His best-known poem "Flores negras" was also put to music as a pasillo, probably composed by Flórez himself. According to José Pinilla Aguilar, Flórez performed "Flores negras" with Pedro Morales Pino and the Lira Colombiana at the Teatro Colón in Guatemala in 1899; other sources claim that the poem was first written in 1903. Other notable pasillos written by Flórez include "Y lo besó en la frente", "Tanto me odias", and "Góndolas azules". Flórez also played violin in a quintet with other literary musicians including Clímaco Soto Borda on guitar, Diego Fallón on bandola, and Rafael Pombo on dulzaina.

"Flores negras" by Áñez and Briceño
Flórez's pasillo "Flores negras", recorded in 1923 by Jorge Áñez and Alcides Briceño

Several of Flórez's poems were put to music by other composers, including "Canción de la tarde" and "Hondos pesares" (by Emilio Murillo), and "En las tristes noches del helado invierno" (by Eduardo Cadavid).

== Personal life and death ==
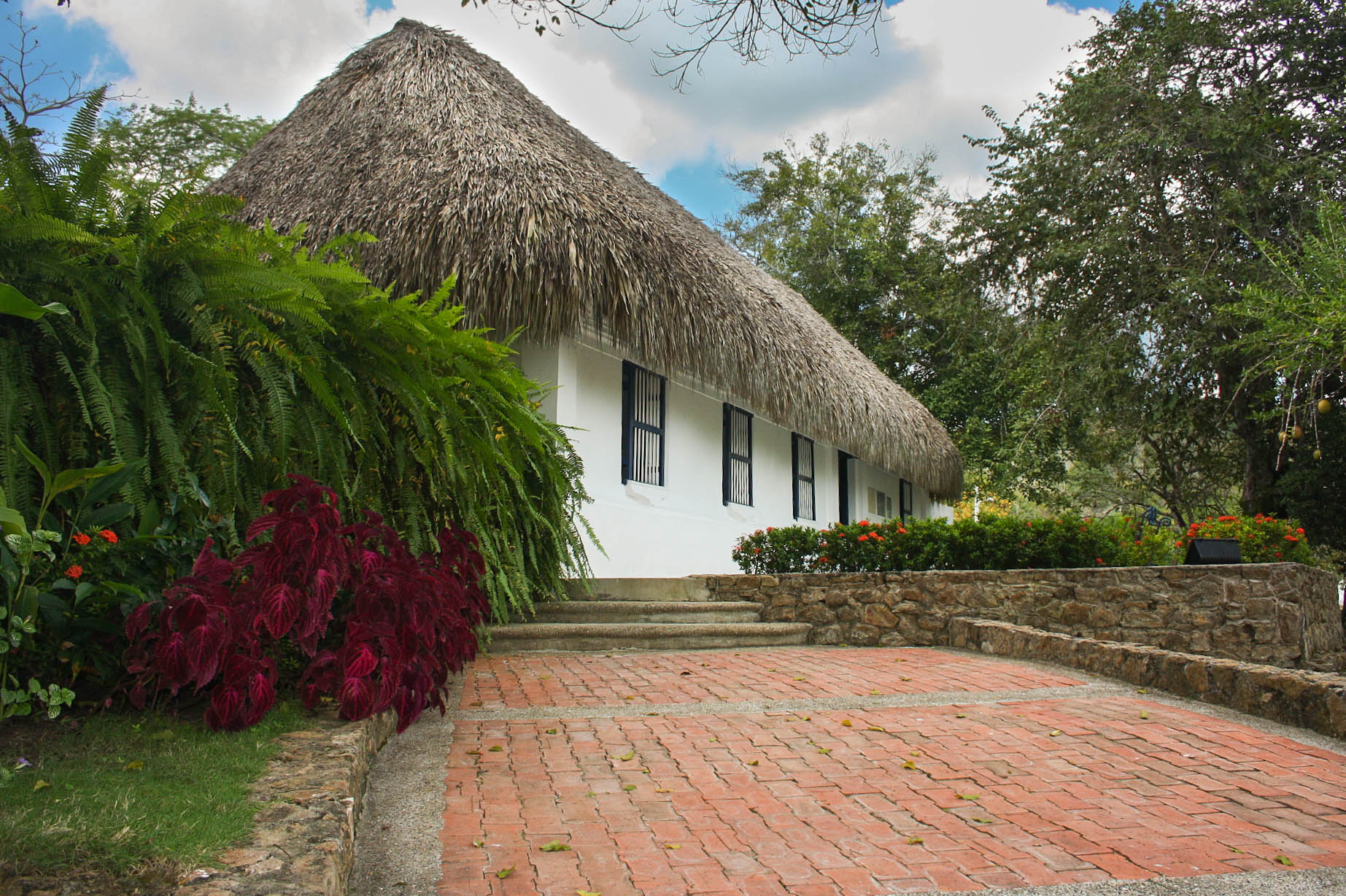
The house where Flórez lived and died in Usiacurí, now a museum

While visiting Usiacurí in 1909, at the age of 42, Flórez fell in love with a 14-year-old girl named Petrona Moreno Nieto. They had five children together out of wedlock, and were only formally married in 1922 when Flórez was already deathly ill, in order that their children not be declared illegitimate.

Flórez died on 7 February 1923 in Usiacurí.

== Books of poetry ==
- Horas (1893)
- Cardos y lirios (1905)
- Manojo de zarzas (1906)
- Cesta de lotos (1906)
- Fronda lírica (1908)
- Gotas de ajenjo (1909)
- De pie los muertos (1917)
- Oro y ébano (1943)
