= Torrealba =

Torrealba is a surname, and may refer to:

- Annae Torrealba (born 1975), Venezuelan singer
- Daniela Torrealba (born 1989), Venezuelan model
- Honorio Torrealba (1950-2010), Venezuelan comedian
- Irania Torrealba (born 1953), Venezuelan architect
- José Torrealba (born 1980), Venezuelan football striker
- José Francisco Torrealba (1896-1973), Venezuelan microbiologist
- Juan Vicente Torrealba (born 1917), Venezuelan musician and composer
- Jesús Torrealba (born 1958), Venezuelan politician
- Manuel Torrealba Lossi (born 1927), Venezuelan poet and writer
- Moisés Torrealba (born 1978), Venezuelan musician
- Pablo Torrealba (born 1948), Venezuelan baseball player
- Pilar Torrealba (born 1947), Venezuelan singer
- Pompeyo Torrealba (born 1946), Venezuelan militar
- Rafael Torrealba (born 1953), Venezuelan jockey
- Steve Torrealba (born 1978), Venezuelan baseball player
- Witremundo Torrealba (1935-1981), Venezuelan microbiologist
- Yorvit Torrealba (born 1978), Venezuelan baseball player
- Alberto Arvelo Torrealba (1905 - 1971), Venezuelan lawyer, educator and poet
- Mariángel Ruiz Torrealba (born 1980), Venezuelan actress and show hostees
