= Sanjuanero =

Song
- Genre: Bambuco
- Songwriter(s): Sofía Gaitán Yanguas
- Composer(s): Anselmo Duran Plazas

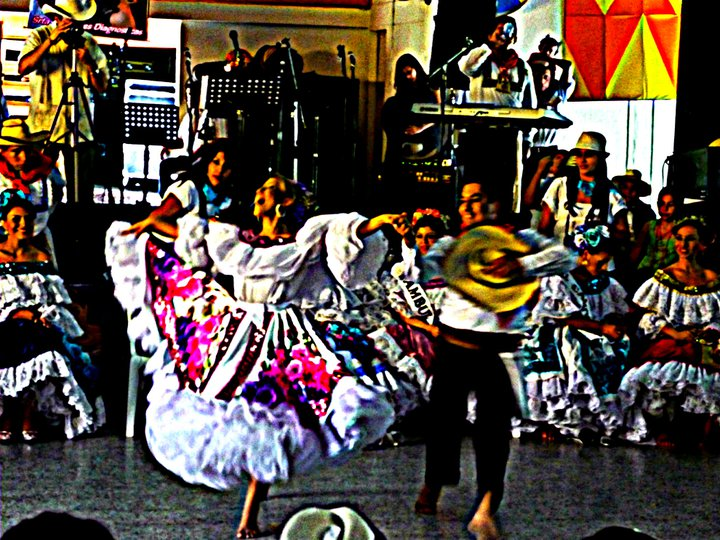
Sanjuanero, first figure of the choreography, "The Invitation".

El Sanjuanero, often called simply Sanjuanero, (translation "St. John's Festivities Song") is a traditional Colombian bambuco song. Its music was written in 1936 by Anselmo Duran Plazas and its lyrics were written by Sofía Gaitán Yanguas. It was first performed on July 12, 1936. and recorded for the first time in the 1950s by the duo Garzon y Collazos. It's one of Colombia's most recognizable folkloric songs, and it is the anthem of the Festival Folclórico y Reinado Nacional del Bambuco.

== Accompanying dance ==
The traditional Sanjuanero choreography was created by folklorist Inés García de Durán in 1960 and consists of three basic steps (caminado, bambuqueado, and contradanza), eight basic figures and five or more adornment figures.

=== Basic steps ===
- El Caminado
- El Bambuqueado
- Los Tres Cuartos

== Role in festivities ==
El Sanjuanero is commonly associated with Huila's Festival Folclórico y Reinado Nacional del Bambuco celebrated each year, in Neiva during the feasts of Saint Peter and Saint John. The Reinado Nacional del Bambuco is a contest similar to beauty pageants in which contestants, each representing a Colombian Department, are judged on six parameters, one of which is performance of the Sanjuanero dance.
