= Vallenata =

Vallenata could refer to:

- A feminine adjective to a person or object from the valley or city of Valledupar, in Colombia.
- The music genre Vallenato ("musica vallenata").
- A radio Station named La Vallenata part of the Colombian radio network Caracol Radio.
