= José A. Morales =

Colombian musician and songwriter (1913–1978)

- Born: José Alejandro Morales López; 19 March 1913; Socorro, Colombia
- Died: 22 September 1978 (aged 65) Bogotá, Colombia

José Alejandro Morales López (Note: In this name that follows Hispanic American naming customs, the first or paternal surname is Morales and the second or maternal family name is López.) (1913–1978) was a Colombian musician and songwriter. He wrote over 200 songs, including notably the waltz "Pueblito viejo". Morales' compositions have been recorded by artists including Garzón y Collazos, Oriol Rangel, and Silva y Villalba.

== Early life and career ==
José Alejandro Morales López was born on 19 March 1913 in Socorro, in the Colombian department of Santander. His father was Marco Tulio Morales, a tailor, and his mother was Dolores López. Morales' father left the family when he was still young, and he lived with his mother in a house with several other women while she worked various jobs. He was first taught music by José de Jesús Vargas, and was already performing on the tiple by 1920.

When Morales was a teenager he formed a musical duo with a travelling singer called "El Negro" Barragán. They went on a tour of Santander, accompanied by a musician called Manuel Durán, which ended in Barichara where Barragán was killed after offending some locals. Morales returned to Socorro to find that his mother had left for Bogotá, because Barragán had given her the keys to a flat that he owned there. Morales did not see his mother again for several years. He left Socorro for Vélez, where in 1933 he met Pacho Benavides, with whom he later performed.

Morales moved to Bogotá in September 1935. He was given a job working at the military armoury by Minister of War Marco Antonio Aulí, where he stayed for eight years. In 1936 he wrote his first song, the tango "Martha". In 1943, the Colombian Ministry of Foreign Affairs sent a cultural delegation to Caracas, which Morales joined, alongside Pacho Benavides. Morales first gained recognition as a composer in 1949, with his bambuco "María Antonia". In total he wrote over 200 songs, which were recorded by artists including Garzón y Collazos, Oriol Rangel, and Silva y Villalba.

Morales wrote for cultural journals and from 1950 onwards appeared on the radio, where he hosted the show Oriente with Flavio de Castro. He worked for record label Sonolux as head of public relations, a job he held for over a decade, and became good friends with the label's artistic director Jaime Llano González, for whom he composed several songs.

== Personal life and death ==
Morales was highly secretive about his personal life, and regularly claimed to have no family at all. He had one daughter Josefina, born to Aurora Gutiérrez Chaparro in 1935. Morales' close friend Jaime Llano González said that he only learned of Josefina's existence two days before Morales died.

Morales died in Bogotá on 22 September 1978. His funeral was held at the Basílica de Nuestra Señora de Lourdes in the neighbourhood of Chapinero. It was the first funeral to be televised in Colombia, at the request of businessman Carlos Ardila Lülle. Morales is buried in a mausoleum in Socorro, designed by Jairo Rojas González.

== Musical style and compositions ==
In total, Morales wrote 231 songs. He started his career composing tango and bolero, foreign styles which were popular in Colombia at the time. The first song that he wrote was the tango "Martha" in 1936. His first composition in a Colombian genre was the bambuco "Socorraniya", in 1939. The first song of Morales' to be recorded was the bambuco "Campesina santandereana", by the trio Los Provincianos.

Morales' best-known composition is the waltz "Pueblito viejo". It was first recorded by Garzón y Collazos, and versions have appeared in over 20 languages, including Esperanto. Other notable songs written by Morales include "Ayer me echaron del pueblo" (written in the 1950s about La Violencia, sometimes called the first Colombian protest song), "Yo también tuve 20 años", and "Pescador, lucero y río".

Morales dedicated many songs to people he knew. He wrote the pasillos "Titiribí" and "Jaime Llano González" for his friend Jaime Llano González, as well as "Marielena" for Llano's daughter. He also wrote songs for beauty queens ("Sarita Consuegra", "Merceditas Baquero") and other women that he was enamored with ("María Antonia", "Doña Rosario").
