= Jorge Villamil =

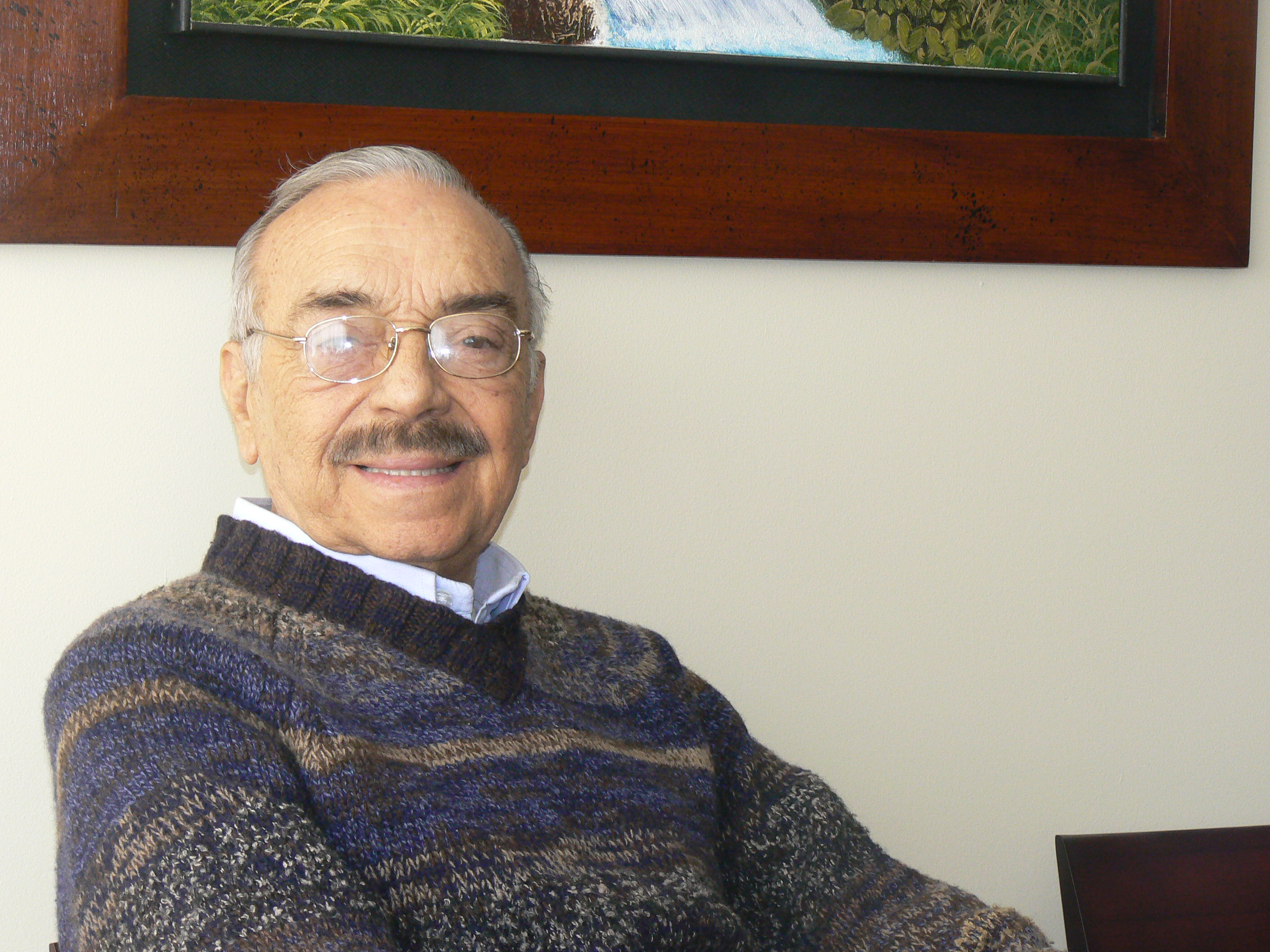

Background information
- Born: Jorge Augusto Villamil Cordovez; June 6, 1929; Huila, Colombia
- Died: February 28, 2010 (aged 80) Bogotá, Colombia
- Genres: Music of Colombia; Bambuco; Guabina; Vals
- Occupations: Songwriter, Musician, Producer, Physician
- Instruments: Voice; Guitar; Tiple
- Years active: 1940–2010

Jorge Villamil Cordovez (June 6, 1929 – February 28, 2010) was a Colombian composer and songwriter born in El Cedral, a large coffee plantation near Neiva (Huila). He was one of the most prolific and important composers of Colombia and South America. Villamil's talent was evident when he learned to play Colombian tiple at 4 years of age. He was the youngest and only male of a family of 7.

== Biography ==
Villamil's parents were Jorge Villamil Ortega and Leonor Cordovez Pizarro (Panama). He grew up in a large farm in the country side of Colombia this was a critical factor on his future musical works; some of them describe the social struggles of Colombian history and the colorful life of the country side. Jorge Villamil studied elemental school in Garzón (a small town in Huila Department) and graduated from high school in Bogotá (Colombia). In 1958, Jorge Augusto Villamil received his doctorate in medicine with a specialization in orthopedic surgery from Pontificia Universidad Javeriana.

On November 11, 1965, he married Olga Lucia Ospina (daughter of Mariano Ospina Navia and Beatriz Serrano de Ospina). They had two children Jorge and Ana Maria Villamil Ospina. One year later, the couple moved to Mexico D.F. to study on Centro Cuauthémoc. There he came in contact with many famous artists who influenced his career such as José Alfredo Jiménez, Pedro Vargas, Mario Moreno Cantinflas, Los Panchos, Armando Manzanero, Marco Antonio Muñiz, Consuelo Velásquez, Lola Beltrán, Amalia Mendoza La Tariácuri, Estela Núñez, Antonio Aguilar and Vicente Fernández. During his stay in Mexico, he created more than 20 songs including El Barcino, Entre cadenas, Ocasos, Oropel, Penas al viento, Sólo recuerdos, Soñar contigo and Soy Cobarde.

In the '70s, Jorge Villamil was living between his medicine practice in the Instituto de Seguros Sociales, his family and music. During 1976, in one of the hardest decisions of his life, Jorge Villamil retired from a promissory medicine career and started officially a career in arts as a composer.

He separated from his wife Olga Lucia (1974), who died 4 years later at the age of 33.

== Interpreters ==
Jorge Villamil has written more than 190 songs. His country geographical richness and beauty as well as a constant admiration for the human nature are depicted on his musical work. His songs are part of Colombian history and have been interpreted by many famous international and Colombian artists. From Mexico, Javier Solis, Marco Antonio Muñiz, Alejandro Fernández, Vicente Fernández, Felipe Arriaga; other international artists are Soraya, Juan Erasmo Mochi (Spain), Julio Jaramillo (Ecuador), Jerónimo (Alberto Pedro Gonzales, Argentina), Leo Marini (Argentina), Olga Guillot (Cuba), Hamid Saab (France), Salvatore Castagnada (Italy), Lindomar Castilho (Brazil), Los Chalchaleros (Argentina) and Franck Pourcel (France), among others. In Colombia, musical groups like Silva y Villalba, Garzon y Collazos, Emeterio y Felipe, Los Hermanos Martinez, Carlos Julio Ramirez, Víctor Hugo Ayala, Jaime Mora, Billy Pontoni, Jesus David Quintana, Alci Acosta, Carmenza Duque, Isadora, Helenita Vargas, Carmina Gallo, Lyda Zamora, Jaime Llano González, among others.

He has been the recipient of numerous national and international awards. Internationally, The Association of Latin Entertainment Critics ACE – Composer of the Year (1978), Hollywood Gold Palm (1969), Carnegie Hall – Latin Recognition (1977), Human Values Award by the Organization of American States, United Nation Recognition (1985), Gallo de Oro (Brazil), Distinguished Guest by URSS. From Colombia, different Presidential, Congressional and cultural awards.

== Death ==
Jorge Villamil died at his residence in Bogotá at 10 pm (UTC-5) on February 28, 2010, of diabetes-related complications.

== Songs ==
Some if his songs are:

- Espumas (1962)
- Llamarada (1970)
- Llorando por amor (1961)
- Los Remansos (1964)
- Los Guaduales (1965)
- Me llevarás en Ti (1966)
- El Barcino (1969)
- Oropel (1969)
- Adiós al Huila (1951)
- Garza Morena (1962)
- Luna Roja (1976)
- Vieja Hacienda del Cedral (1958)
- Brumas (1971)
- Campanas de Navidad (1957)
- Cruz sin nombre (1982)
- Desesperanzas (1960),
- Canaguaro (1978)
- El caballo Colombiano (1976)
- El canalete (1970)
- El caracoli (1958)
- El Embajador (1962)
- El Gualanday (1965)
- El Peregrino (1997)
- Fantasia Sabanera (1994)
- La Chimenea (1975)
- La Cicatriz (1968)
- La Mestiza (1984)
- La Mortaja (1958)
- La Trapichera (1958)
- La Vaqueria (1960)
- Llano Grande (1963)
- Matambo (1961)
- Mirando al Valle del Cauca (1964)
- Al Sur (1967)
- Noche de Azahares (1962)
- Noches de la Plata (1960)
- Painima (1964)
- Tepeyac (1998)
