= Francisco Zapata =

Colombian musician and bandleader

- Also known as: Pacho Zapata
- Born: Francisco Zapata Vallejo; 2 February 1941; Támesis, Colombia
- Died: 16 May 2011 (aged 70) Santa Marta, Colombia

Francisco Zapata Vallejo (Note: In this Spanish name, the first or paternal surname is Zapata and the second or maternal family name is Vallejo.) (1941–2011), also known as Pacho Zapata, was a Colombian musician and bandleader. He led several bands including Los Teen Agers and Los Ocho de Colombia, and is remembered for his virtuosity on the piano and Hammond organ.

== Biography ==
=== Early life and education ===
Francisco Zapata Vallejo was born in Támesis, in the Colombian department of Antioquia, on 2 February 1941. His father was a well-known singer and singing teacher. Zapata studied at the University of Antioquia and was taught music at the Institute of Fine Arts in Medellín by Harold Martina and Enrique Gallego.

=== Music career ===
In 1960 Zapata replaced Aníbal Ángel as leader of Los Teen Agers, a band that had been founded in 1956 by Juan José Veléz (guitar), Octavio Velásquez (accordion), and Luis Fernando Escobar (percussion). At the same time Gustavo Quintero was replaced as singer by Vicente Villa.

In 1968 Los Teen Agers were renamed to Los Ocho de Colombia by the organiser of a festival in Argentina where they were playing, because the festival rules forbade English names. After the renaming, Zapata and the group relocated to Bogotá, where they recorded 12 LPs. In Bogotá, Zapata became musical director of TV station Caracol and programadora Jorge Barón Televisión. Later he directed the Orquesta de las Estrellas, which played live on the TV show el Show de las Estrellas. Around this time Zapata also directed groups Los Zeta and Grupo Maffia Bella, and recorded solo LPs. By the end of 1979 Zapata had recorded 52 LPs for record labels including Codiscos, Discos Fuentes, Discos Tropical, Philips, and Discos Orbe.

Zapata is remembered for his virtuosity on the piano and Hammond organ. José Pinilla Aguilar writes that "artistically, [Zapata] has rivalled Jaime Llano González, Manuel J. Bernal, and other gentlemen of that calibre. Although, to tell the truth, Pachito surpasses them in his skill, versatility, and originality."

=== Death ===
Zapata died on 16 May 2011 in Santa Marta.
