= Gildardo Montoya =

Colombian musician and songwriter

- Born: Gildardo Montoya Ortiz; 10 February 1939; Palermo, Antioquia, Colombia
- Died: 25 November 1976 (aged 37) Medellín, Colombia
- Years active: 1960–1976

Gildardo Montoya Ortiz (Note: In this Spanish name, the first or paternal surname is Montoya and the second or maternal family name is Ortiz.) (1939–1976) was a Colombian musician and songwriter. He played tiple, guitar, and accordion, was the artistic director of Codiscos, and wrote well-known songs in several Colombian and Latin American styles before his death in a road accident at the age of 37.

== Biography ==
=== Early life ===
Montoya was born on 10 February 1939 in Palermo, in the Colombian department of Antioquia. His father was Jesús Montoya Sánchez and his mother was Julia Ortiz Echeverry. His maternal grandfather Manuel Ortiz made and played tiples and guitars in the town of Jericó.

=== Career ===
Montoya's first job was picking coffee in Fredonia. He then moved to Medellín where he worked at a butcher's shop in the neighbourhood of Aranjuez. In Medellín he became interested in music, particularly the work of Mexican musician José Alfredo Jiménez and Colombian songwriters José A. Bedoya and José Muñoz. Montoya won an accordion in a raffle at his work, and he started writing songs; his first recordings were "Los Reyes Magos" and "Aguinaldo al Escondido" in 1960.

Montoya wrote hundreds of songs in several styles, and his lyrics are known for their wit and wordplay. In 2021 El Colombiano called him "one of the best – if not the best – Antioquian lyricists of the last century." He recorded 307 songs in total before his early death.

In 1972 Montoya became artistic director of Medellín record label Codiscos. Around this time he wrote one of his best-known songs, "Plegaria Vallenata", which was recorded by Alejo Durán and Daniel Santos, among others.

=== Personal life and death ===
Montoya was married to Silvia Cruz, whom he met in 1963 in Medellín. They had three children. He died in Medellín on 25 November 1976 after being hit by a truck while driving his Honda 350 motorbike.

== Musical style and compositions ==
Montoya is particularly remembered for the songs he wrote in the style of parranda paisa, which is a type of traditional Christmas music in Antioquia. He also composed in other styles, including ranchera, corrido, vallenato (particularly paseo and merengue), currulao, pasodoble, bambuco, pasillo, porro, and cumbia.

Although he is well-known for his parranda paisa compositions, Montoya often credited their authorship to others because he saw them as lesser work compared to his compositions in tropical music genres and his directorship of Codiscos.

Montoya's notable compositions include: "El Arruinado", "Como Yo Soy Tan Raro", "Plegaria Vallenata", "Maldita Navidad" (recorded by Gabriel Romero), "La Trilogía del Arruinado", "El Gitano Groserón", "Dele por Ahí", "El Trovador del Valle", "El Corbata Gastador", "Te Casaste", "Toño", "En el Tren de Seis", "El Barrilito", "El Aguardientosky", and "Tiburón Comelón".

== Albums ==
- Dele Por' Ai (1975, Discos Victoria), as Gildardo Montoya y su Conjunto
- El Gitano Groserón (1976, Discos Victoria), as Gildardo Montoya y su Conjunto
