= Guabina Chiquinquireña =

Colombian instrumental song

Song
- Genre: Guabina
- Songwriter(s): Alberto Urdaneta

"Guabina Chiquinquireña" is a Colombian instrumental song in the guabina rhythm written by Alberto Urdaneta.

In its list of the 50 best Colombian songs of all time, El Tiempo, Colombia's most widely circulated newspaper, ranked the version of the song recorded in the 1960s by Garzón y Collazos at No. 15. Viva Music Colombia rated the song No. 33 on its list of the 100 most important Colombian songs of all time.
