= Oriol Rangel =

Colombian musician and composer

- Also known as: The Pianist with the Silken Hands
- Born: José Oriol Rangel Rozo; 12 August 1916; Pamplona, Colombia
- Died: 14 January 1977 (aged 60) Bogotá, Colombia
- Spouse: Josefina Ramírez

José Oriol Rangel Rozo (Note: In this Spanish name, the first or paternal surname is Rangel and the second or maternal family name is Rozo.) (1916–1977), known as Oriol Rangel, was a Colombian musician and composer. Rangel could play piano, violin, organ, cello, and flute. His soft style on the piano earned him the nickname "The Pianist with the Silken Hands" (Spanish: El Pianista de las Manos de Seda).

== Biography ==
=== Early life ===
Rangel was born on 12 August 1916 in Pamplona, in the Colombian department of Norte de Santander. His father Gerardo Rangel was a pianist, organist, and composer, and his maternal uncle José Rozo Contreras was a composer, musician, and orchestra conductor. Rangel's father taught him to play music as a child, and his first performance was on the organ at a local church at the age of seven.

=== Music career ===
Rangel studied at the school of music in Pamplona. In 1932 he went to Cúcuta and was hired as the in-house pianist of radio station Radio Unica. Rangel moved to Bogotá in 1934 at the age of 18, where he studied at the National Conservatory from 1935 to 1940 and worked as a backing pianist at the radio station La Voz de la Víctor. Later he organised and directed musical performances at the open-air theatre La Media Torta, and directed the orchestras of the radio stations La Voz de Colombia and Nueva Granada (the latter for over two decades). He was also an in-house musician at Radiodifusora Nacional de Colombia, which later became Radio Nacional de Colombia.

Rangel worked with many other well-known Colombian musicians, including Jaime Llano González, Berenice Chávez, Ruth Marulanda, and Los Hermanos Martínez. He was in a conjunto with Llano González and his brother Otón Rangel, and also recorded duet albums with Llano González, including notably Inspiración (1964).

=== Personal life and death ===
Rangel was married Josefina Ramírez, with whom he had two children: Josefa and Oriol. He died in Bogotá on 14 January 1977 of a heart condition.

== Musical style and compositions ==
Rangel wrote over 100 songs and recorded for labels including Sonolux and RCA Victor. He was particularly known for composing in traditional Colombian styles including guabina, pasillo, bambuco, bunde chocoano, joropo, and torbellino. In Cultores de la Música Colombiana, Rangel is quoted as saying that "every musician should present folklore as they feel it and as it is, not with foreign influences of puritanism and modernism".

Rangel's notable compositions include "Pamplona", "Yolanda", "Amanecer en Monserrate", "A Mi Colombia", "El tigre", "Ríete Gabriel", "Los Ojos de Mi Morena", "El Tato", "Fita Chiquita", "Santandercito", "Fantasía Para Trío de Cuerdas Sobre Motivos Colombianos", "Hágame el Favor Cleofás", "Estudio de Bambuco", and "Radiolocos". He also recorded other people's compositions, and his version of Fulgencio García's "La Gata Golosa" was included by El Tiempo in their 2013 list of the 50 greatest Colombian songs.
