= Rafael Godoy =

Rafael Godoy Lozano (24 October 1907 – 14 March 1973) was a well-known Colombian composer born in Natagaima, Tolima.

== Biography ==
From a young age, he was linked to the trade-union movement in Barrancabermeja, Santander, from where he had to emigrate when his personal security was threatened. He fled to Venezuela, where he developed his musical career and composed what are often taken to be his best musical pieces.

His most widely known, and possibly best song, is the bambuco "Soy Colombiano" (I'm Colombian); he composed many other less-known bambucos and andean music songs, such as "Arrunchaditos", "Pasito", "Mi cafetal", "Canto a Colombia", "Tierra caliente" and many others.

Many versions of "Soy Colombiano" have appeared since it was composed, even a vallenato version by Lisandro Meza, although the most popular version is the one from the Tolimense folk music duet Garzón y Collazos.

Rafael Godoy died in Caracas, Venezuela, on March 14, 1973 at the age of 65.
