= The Boy and the Pope =

1986 film

The Child and the Pope
- Directed by: Rodrigo Castaño
- Starring: Carmenza Duque; Cristopher Lago Verónica Castro; Andres Garcia
- Release dates: January 28, 1987 (Colombia); April 16, 1987 (Mexico)
- Running time: 96 minutes
- Countries: Colombia; Mexico

The Boy and the Pope (Spanish: El niño y el Papa) (also known as The Child and the Pope) is a 1987 Colombian film. It tells the story of a nine-year-old Mexican boy named Angel who wants to meet the Pope after he is a victim of the 1985 Mexico City earthquake.

The film was directed by Rodrigo Castaño and stars Christopher Lago and Verónica Castro. In 1987 it was released after Pope John Paul II's visit to Colombia.

== Plot ==
The film is set in a humble Mexico City neighborhood. Angel, a small boy, lives with his mother, who is a homemaker and works as a seamstress. She dreams that her son will study and someday receive a bachelor's degree. When Angel is at school, a strong earthquake strikes the city leaving thousands of people injured (or worse), including Angel and his mother.

Angel is desperate to find his mother, so he decides to walk until arriving at the Basilica of our Lady of Guadalupe, with the intention of praying for her. At the same time, Alicia, his mother, is helped by Carlos, a hospital doctor. As the boy leaves the church, he sees a large statue of Pope John Paul II, and a priest tells him that the Pope's next visit will be to Colombia.

An hour later, he goes to the registration of missing people, and he decides that his mother's name would not appear among those who had been found and he could be sent to an orphanage. Hearing this, he flees, coming to the airport, where he thinks it would be a good idea to take the next flight bound to Colombia to meet the Pope.

Arriving in Colombia, flight attendants find him hidden in a bathroom of the plane and hand him over to a woman to take charge, but Angel escapes. The next day, he goes to a food stand and is seen by Carmen, who works there. When she offers him a potato, he steals a piece of "black pudding" and is caught immediately by the business owner. When Carmen realizes he is attacking Angel, she intervenes on his behalf and eventually quits her job.

Angel apologizes for his behavior and she forgives him. He explains what happened with the earthquake and his mother and asks to stay in her home; she finally believes him and agrees to give him shelter. On the other hand, the doctor realizes that Alicia suffers from amnesia, because she does not remember anything about her past life and had forgotten her own name. The doctor decides to call her "Guadalupe".

Carmen knows that Angel's wish is to meet the Pope. She accompanies him to Bolivar square and suggests places where he might go to get information regarding the Pope.

After unsuccessful attempts to establish contact with the Pope, Angel reads the newspaper and notices that they were looking for a performer to sing at the Pope's reception. Angel realizes that Carmen has a great aptitude for singing, and convinces her to answer this call. Alicia remembers little about her past and Carlos invites her to meet his mother, who cordially receives her at home. Meanwhile, Angel decides to ask for help from "Mr Fulgencio" to compose a song for the Pope. However, Carmen was not entered formally in the competition and is rejected. Despite the adversities, the parish Father noticed that Carmen had a great talent and sang the best song. However, the contest has been rigged in favor of another singer. Angel discovers that everything had been rigged, which gives Carmen that chance to sing. When Carmen is about to sing, Angel is prevented from entering. Ultimately, he gets in and is received by the Pope, who kisses him on the forehead and blesses him.

Carlos's mother turns on the TV just as the Pope's visit to Colombia is broadcast, so that Alicia sees her son and she begins to remember. She asks Carlos' help, and he communicates with the singer. The film ends when Angel greets his mother by phone.
