= Pedro Morales Pino =

Colombian musician and songwriter (1863–1926)

- Morales Pino (standing, centre) and the Lira Colombiana, c. 1902

Background information
- Also known as: The father of Colombian music
- Born: Pedro Pascacio de Jesús Morales Pino; 22 February 1863; Cartago, Granadine Confederation
- Died: 4 April 1926 (aged 63) Bogotá, Colombia
- Years active: 1884–1922

Pedro Pascacio de Jesús Morales Pino (Note: In this Spanish name, the first or paternal surname is Morales and the second or maternal family name is Pino.) (1863–1926) was a Colombian musician, songwriter, bandleader, and painter. He led the Lira Colombiana, who were the first Colombian band to tour outside the country. Morales Pino composed in the traditional Colombian styles of bambuco and pasillo, and is known as the "father of Colombian music" (Spanish: padre de la música colombiana).

== Early life and education ==
Morales Pino was born to Ramón Morales and Bárbara Pino on 22 February 1863 in Cartago, in what is now the Colombian department of Valle del Cauca but was then Cauca State. He was baptised two days later with the name Pedro Pascacio de Jesús. Morales Pino had two siblings, Arcelia and Luisa, and he grew up in poverty after his father left the family.

In Cartago, Morales Pino was taught charcoal drawing by José Hoyos and bandola by Ramón Antonio de la Peña. His mother moved the family to Ibagué in 1878, and there his bandola playing was noticed by Adolfo Sicard, who paid for him to continue his musical education in Bogotá.

In 1880, Morales Pino moved into a studio in the Pasaje Rivas area of Bogotá. He continued painting, and took part in the National Painting Exhibition held in Bogotá in 1881, where his exhibited works included a portrait of Salvador Camacho Roldán. That year he painted a portrait of Anselmo Pineda which was hung in the Pineda Library. In 1882, Jorge Wilson Price founded the National Academy of Music in Bogotá, and Morales Pino enrolled. There he was taught composition by Julio Quevedo Arvelo.

== Music career ==
=== First musical groups ===
Morales Pino formed his first musical group in 1884, a duo in which he played bandurria alongside Vicente Pizarro on guitar. Their first performance was at the Teatro Maldonado in Bogotá in November 1884. They expanded to a trio called the Trío Colombiano with Rafael Riaño on tiple in 1886, and Pizarro was replaced on guitar by Ricardo Acevedo Bernal in 1887. The trio disbanded in 1889 and Morales Pino went to live with his mother in Ibagué, where he worked as a music teacher until his return to Bogotá in 1893.

=== Lira Colombiana ===
Following a meeting with Emilio Bobadilla, who encouraged him to continue his musical career, Morales Pino formed a group called the Lira Colombiana in 1897. Fulgencio García was also in the group initially. Morales Pino wanted to take the Lira Colombiana to Paris for the 1900 Paris Exposition, and in an unsuccessful attempt to secure government funding for the trip they performed for president Manuel Antonio Sanclemente in Anapoima in November 1898.

Nine members of the band embarked on the trip anyway without the funding, and they left Anapoima and passed through Girardot and Honda (where they played at the opening ceremony of the Navarro Bridge in January 1899), Puerto Berrío, Medellín, Manizales, and Cartago, where they stayed while Morales Pino recovered from a typhus infection. The band then went to Cali where they performed in July 1899. In Cali, the Lira Colombiana lost three members: Isaías Rodríguez, cellist Julio Valencia who left to get married, and guitarist Silvestre Cepeda who became seriously ill with typhus. Now with six members, the band went to Buenaventura, where they had planned to take a ship to Europe. The city was experiencing an epidemic of yellow fever, and so the band took the first ship out of port, which took them to Panama.

From Panama, the Lira Colombiana travelled northwards through Central America, performing in San José, Costa Rica and León, Nicaragua. On Christmas Day 1899 they played in San Salvador, and they then went to Santa Ana, where they stayed until April 1900. After El Salvador they travelled to Guatemala, where they were joined for some performances by Colombian poet Julio Flórez on violin. Tiple player José Vicente Martínez had become schizophrenic after witnessing a devastating fire in San Salvador, and he died in Guatemala, bringing the group to five members. Morales Pino wanted the band to perform at the Pan-American Exposition in the US, and so the band took a ship in July 1901 to New Orleans, from where they went to play in St. Louis and then at the Exposition in Buffalo. On the Fourth of July 1902 the Lira Colombiana played in New York, and then they disbanded. In New York, singer and bandola player Carlos Wordsworthy committed suicide. The trip was the first international tour made by a Colombian band.

=== Later iterations of the Lira Colombiana ===
After living in Guatemala for several years, Morales Pino returned to Bogotá with his family in 1912. He reformed the Lira Colombiana, and directed the band until the death of his wife in 1916, at which point he returned to Guatemala. In 1920, Morales Pino once again moved back to Bogotá and reformed the Lira Colombiana. The singers Alejandro Wills and Alberto Escobar were members of this iteration of the band.

Morales Pino again appealed to the Colombian government for funds to finance an international tour, and was again unsuccessful. Despite this, he and the Lira Colombiana travelled to Cali where they performed in July 1922. The band then left Colombia and played shows in Quito and Lima, after which they disbanded for the final time.

== Musical style and compositions ==
Morales Pino predominantly played and composed in the styles of bambuco and pasillo. He played guitar and bandola, and together with instrument maker Jorge Montoya created a modified version of the bandola which is now the standard form in Colombia.

Notable songs written by Morales Pino include "Cuatro Preguntas", "Fusagasugueño", and "María Luisa". He was also the first person to transcribe many of the traditional pasillos and bambucos. Morales Pino is known as the "father of Colombian music" (Spanish: padre de la música colombiana), and is the namesake of the Trío Morales Pino.

== Personal life and death ==
Morales Pino met his wife Francisca Llerena Lambour in Guatemala, and they lived there together from 1905 to 1912, when they moved to Bogotá with their daughters Alicia, Rebeca, and Raquel. Llerena died of typhus in 1916.

In the last years of his life, Morales Pino worked as a music teacher. He died of liver cirrhosis on 4 March 1926 in Bogotá.
