= Carmenza Duque =

Colombian singer (1951–2025)

- Born: Carmen Elvira Duque Uribe; 17 March 1951; Manizales, Colombia
- Died: 22 May 2025 (aged 74) United States

Carmen Elvira Duque Uribe (Note: In this Spanish name, the first or paternal surname is Duque and the second or maternal family name is Uribe.) (17 March 1951 – 22 May 2025), known by the stage name Carmenza Duque, was a Colombian singer. She released 40 albums in a decades-long career. On her death El Espectador wrote that "her soft and deep voice marked several generations and left an indelible mark on Colombian popular music."

== Biography ==
Duque was born on 17 March 1951 in Manizales, in the Colombian department of Caldas.

She started singing at school, but hid it from her parents. She began her music career on La Noche Fantástica, a radio programme on Caracol Radio hosted by Otto Greiffestein, although at the request of her father she was credited only as "The Phantom Voice" (Spanish: La Voz Fantasma). Duque moved to Bogotá to study anthropology, and there she released her first two albums; one was distributed privately, and the other, Soy Tan Feliz, was successful in Colombia, Peru, Ecuador, and Venezuela. In Bogotá Duque became friends with Óscar Golden and other performers from El Club del Clan. She also started appearing regularly on television, which increased her popularity.

In 1972 Duque married Jorge Alberto Gutiérrez Gómez. He disapproved of her singing career, and until their separation in 1990 she only performed once a year. With Gutiérrez, Duque had two children, Simon and Maria Francisca. In 1987 Simon was diagnosed with leukemia, and following his recovery Duque founded the Los Niños de Carmenza Duque Foundation, which helped to fund treatment for 35 children with leukemia before closing seven years later.

Duque sang for Pope John Paul II during his 1986 visit to Colombia, and later starred in the 1987 film The Boy and the Pope, which is partially set during the visit.

Duque's successful songs include "Popurrí", "La Potra Zaina" (soundtrack of the telenovela of the same name), "El Barcino", the ranchera "Se Me Olvidó Otra Vez", the boleros "Sabor a Mí", "Se Te Olvida", "Sin Ti", and "Tu Me Acostumbraste", and the ballads "Mejor Que Nunca" and "Tú Me Complementas". She released 40 albums in total, 11 of which were recorded in Mexico, and performed with singers including Armando Manzanero, Alicia Juárez, Pedro Vargas, and José Alfredo Jiménez.

Duque's final album was El Secreto de Mi Voz, released in 2013. She had multiple heart attacks following her retirement, and she died on 22 May 2025 of pancreatitis while on holiday in the United States.
