= Támesis, Antioquia =

Támesis
- Municipality and town
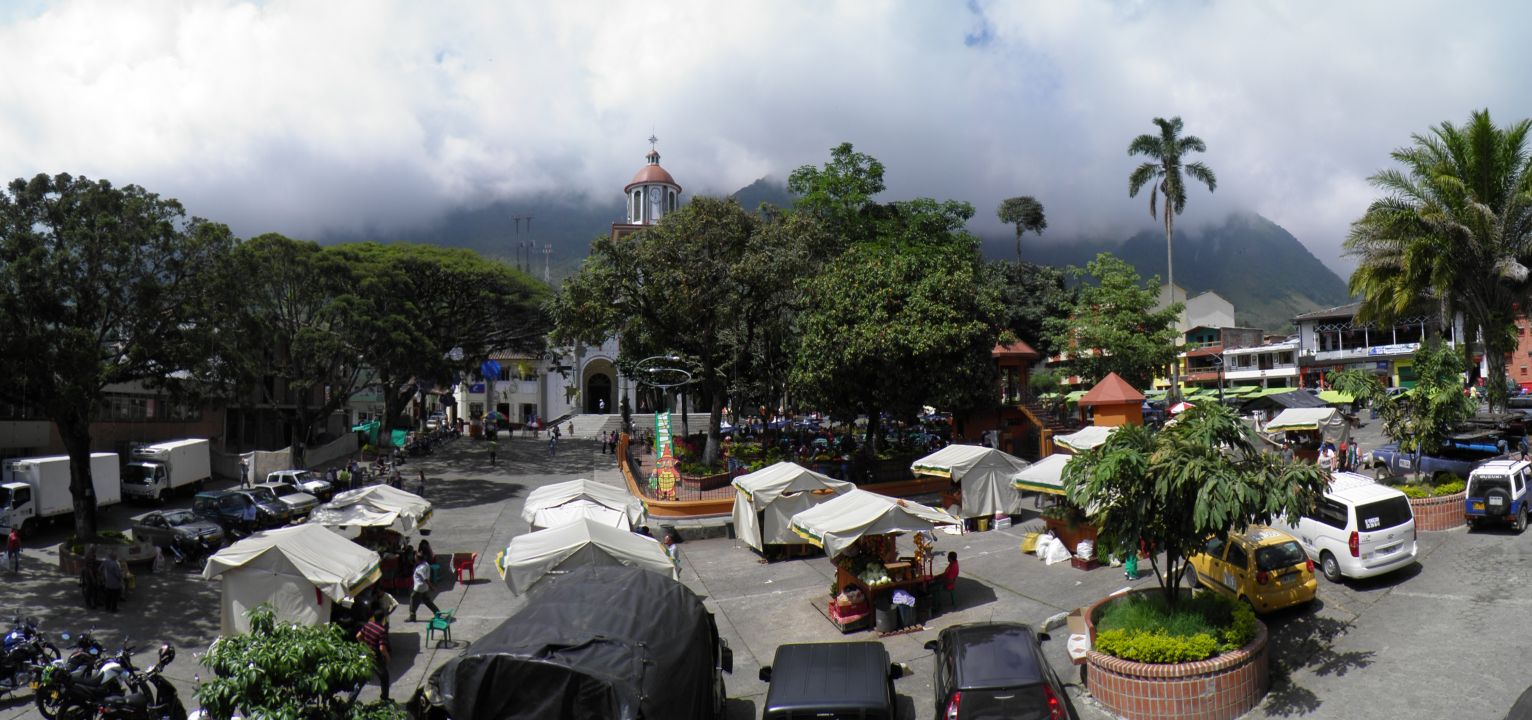
- The main square — Parque Principal. Cerro de Cristo Rey in the background, covered by clouds

- Flag Coat of arms

- Location of the municipality and town of Támesis, Antioquia in the Antioquia Department of Colombia

- Location in Colombia
- Coordinates: 5°39′53″N 75°42′52″W
- Country: Colombia
- Department: Antioquia Department
- Subregion: Southwestern

Area
  - Municipality and town: 243 km^{2} (94 sq mi)
  - Urban: 1 km^{2} (0.39 sq mi)
- Elevation: 1,638 m (5,374 ft)

Population
  - Municipality and town: 16,500
- Time zone: UTC-5 (Colombia Standard Time)
- Website: http://www.tamesis-antioquia.gov.co/index.shtml

Támesis is a town and municipality in the Colombian department of Antioquia. Part of the subregion of Southwestern Antioquia. Located at an elevation of 1,638 m (5,374 ft) above sea level, it was established in 1858. The local economy is based on agriculture.

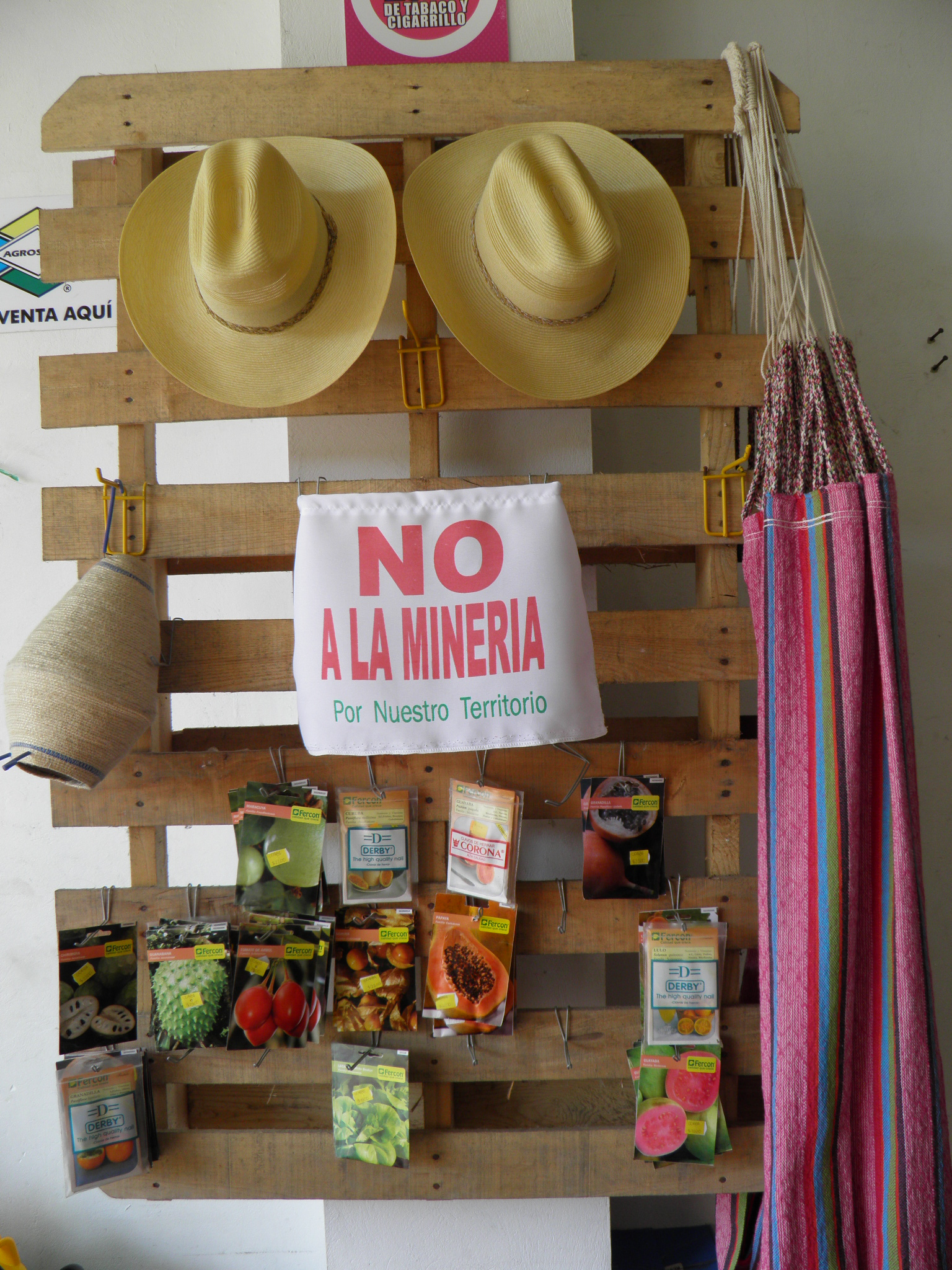
"No to the mine" sign in Támesis

== Environmental issues ==
The mountains in the area, including the Cerro de Cristo Rey mountain overlooking Támesis and a sacred mountain to the Indians, contain valuable mineral deposits. There are plans to develop these resources, but these plans have met local opposition. Some locals are against mining in general, whereas others are questioning the regulation of mining activities that is seen as protecting the multinational companies.

== Climate ==
Climate data for Támesis (Nacional Gja La), elevation 1,151 m (3,776 ft), (1981–2010)
| Month | Jan | Feb | Mar | Apr | May | Jun | Jul | Aug | Sep | Oct | Nov | Dec | Year |
|---|---|---|---|---|---|---|---|---|---|---|---|---|---|
| Mean daily maximum °C (°F) | 28.0 (82.4) | 29.0 (84.2) | 28.9 (84.0) | 27.7 (81.9) | 27.0 (80.6) | 27.2 (81.0) | 27.8 (82.0) | 28.3 (82.9) | 27.5 (81.5) | 26.5 (79.7) | 26.5 (79.7) | 26.9 (80.4) | 27.6 (81.7) |
| Daily mean °C (°F) | 22.7 (72.9) | 23.4 (74.1) | 23.4 (74.1) | 22.9 (73.2) | 22.5 (72.5) | 22.5 (72.5) | 22.7 (72.9) | 23.0 (73.4) | 22.4 (72.3) | 21.8 (71.2) | 22.0 (71.6) | 22.1 (71.8) | 22.6 (72.7) |
| Mean daily minimum °C (°F) | 18.3 (64.9) | 18.6 (65.5) | 18.8 (65.8) | 18.8 (65.8) | 18.8 (65.8) | 18.6 (65.5) | 18.2 (64.8) | 18.3 (64.9) | 18.3 (64.9) | 18.2 (64.8) | 18.5 (65.3) | 18.4 (65.1) | 18.5 (65.3) |
| Average precipitation mm (inches) | 85.9 (3.38) | 102.6 (4.04) | 148.4 (5.84) | 230.5 (9.07) | 291.3 (11.47) | 204.4 (8.05) | 192.3 (7.57) | 202.3 (7.96) | 278.5 (10.96) | 306.5 (12.07) | 246.9 (9.72) | 161.5 (6.36) | 2,451 (96.5) |
| Average precipitation days (≥ 1.0 mm) | 11 | 13 | 16 | 20 | 22 | 17 | 15 | 16 | 20 | 23 | 22 | 15 | 210 |
| Average relative humidity (%) | 81 | 79 | 80 | 83 | 86 | 85 | 82 | 81 | 83 | 86 | 86 | 85 | 83 |
| Mean monthly sunshine hours | 195.3 | 175.0 | 164.3 | 135.0 | 133.3 | 156.0 | 195.3 | 189.1 | 153.0 | 133.3 | 141.0 | 167.4 | 1,938 |
| Mean daily sunshine hours | 6.3 | 6.2 | 5.3 | 4.5 | 4.3 | 5.2 | 6.3 | 6.1 | 5.1 | 4.3 | 4.7 | 5.4 | 5.3 |
Source: Instituto de Hidrologia Meteorologia y Estudios Ambientales

== Notable people ==
- Francisco Zapata, musician and bandleader

== See also ==
- Palermo
