= La Gata Golosa =

Song
- Songwriter: Fulgencio García

"La Gata Golosa" is a Colombian pasillo (dance) written in 1912 by Fulgencio García. It was originally titled "Soacha" (a village near to Bogotá) but was retitled by Garcia in honor of a famous Bogota chichería (chicha bar). Initially the new name was "La gaîté gauloise" in French (the French joy) -the chicha bar in Bogotá was named in reference to La Gaîté, a French famous name (popular journal from 1903, ballet from Offenbach, guinguette open air restaurant and dancing). But the name of the chicha bar and the name of the musical piece changed : the pronunciation of the French words was quickly transformed into the Spanish "La gata golosa" (the sweet-toothed cat).

In its list of the 50 best Colombian songs of all time, El Tiempo, Colombia's most widely circulated newspaper, ranked the version of the song recorded in the 1960s by Oriol Rangel at No. 30. Viva Music Colombia rated the song No. 28 on its list of the 100 most important Colombian songs of all time.
