= Pueblito Viejo (song) =

Song
- Genre: Waltz
- Songwriter: José A. Morales

"Pueblito Viejo" (translation "old town") is a Colombian waltz written by José A. Morales. The song was inspired by the steep, cobbled streets of Socorro, Santander, where Morales spent his childhood. It won a gold record in 1966.

The song has been named as one of the top Colombian songs of all time by multiple media sources:

- In its list of the top ten Colombian songs, El Heraldo rated Pueblito Viejo at No. 4.
- In its list of the 50 best Colombian songs of all time, El Tiempo, Colombia's most widely circulated newspaper, ranked the version of the song by Garzón y Collazos at No. 12.
- Viva Music Colombia rated the song No. 8 on its list of the 100 most important Colombian songs of all time.

The song has been recorded by multiple artists, including Garzón y Collazos, Soraya, Gabino Pampini, Alfredo Rolando Ortiz, Jimmy Salcedo y Su Onda Tres, Manuel Villanueva y Su Orquesta, Orlando Carrizosa, Toño Fuentes, Carmiña Gallo, and Silva Y Villalba.
