= Palermo, Antioquia, Colombia =

Palermo, Támesis
- Populated center
- Location in Colombia
- Coordinates: 5°43′52″N 75°41′42″W
- Country: Colombia
- Department: Antioquia Department

Palermo is a populated center of Colombia in Antioquia, Colombia, in the municipality of Támesis.

Musician and songwriter Gildardo Montoya was born in Palermo.
