= Berenice Chávez =

Colombian singer

- Also known as: Queen of Colombian Song
- Born: Berenice Chávez Cifuentes; 12 June 1926; Bogotá, Colombia
- Died: 7 September 2008 (aged 82) Bogotá, Colombia

Berenice Chávez Cifuentes (Note: In this Spanish name, the first or paternal surname is Chávez and the second or maternal family name is Cifuentes. Chávez's name is sometimes spelled Chavez, Cháves, or Chaves.) (12 June 1926 – 7 September 2008) was a Colombian singer. She sang in various traditional Colombian styles and was known as the "Queen of Colombian Song".

== Biography ==
=== Early life and education ===
Chávez was born on 12 June 1926 (Note: Despite this date being widely published, Chávez was reported on her death in 2008 to have been 87 or 89 years old.) in Bogotá, Colombia to Isidoro Chávez Castillo, a musician and folklorist, and Antonia Cifuentes Hernández. She attended school at the Colegio de la Inmaculada Concepción in Bogotá, where she sang in the school choir. She also knew how to play tiple, but preferred to sing to accompaniment.

=== Music career ===
Chávez was in a duo with her sister Cecilia called Las Hermanas Chávez, and together they regularly sang on radio stations including Radio Nacional de Colombia and La Voz de Colombia; at the same time, Chávez worked at the Colombian Ministry of Public Works for a decade starting from 1944. Las Hermanas Chávez later performed on Rádio Nacional in Brasília.

Las Hermanas Chávez split when Cecilia moved to New York, and Berenice embarked on a solo career. She was known for singing songs in traditional Colombian styles by composers including Alejandro Wills, Alberto Urdaneta Forero, Pelón Santamarta, José A. Morales, and Jorge Villamil. She was friends with musician Jaime Llano González, whom she introduced to his collaborator Oriol Rangel. Chávez also worked in Colombian cinema from the beginnings of the industry, and in total sang in 1,937 films.

Chávez was known as the "Queen of Colombian Song" (Spanish: reina de la canción colombiana). In 2006 she received the Aplauso a las Bellas Artes prize, which is awarded annually at the Teatro de Cristóbal Colón.

=== Personal life and death ===
Chávez was married to Paraguayan harpist Digno García from 1950 to 1961, and they had one son. She died in Bogotá on 7 September 2008.
