= Radio Sutatenza =

Colombia
- Broadcast area: Colombia
- Frequency: See list

Programming
- Format: Community radio

Ownership
- Sister stations: Bachillerato por radio

History
- First air date: 28 September 1947
- Last air date: 17 February 1990

Radio Sutatenza was a Colombian radio network which broadcast cultural and educational programs between 1947 and 1990. It is considered as an inspiration for community radio stations, since it was conceived by a Catholic Church organisation as a direct response to the high levels of illiteracy in rural communities at the time.

Radio Sutatenza was established in 1947 by the Catholic priest José Joaquín Salcedo Guarín in the Colombian town of Sutatenza, located in the Tenza Valley, Boyacá, who founded the Escuelas Radiofónicas (Radio Schools). Radio Sutatenza was conceived as a direct response to the high levels of illiteracy in rural communities at the time. Radio Sutatenza was granted a license from the then Colombian Ministry of Communications with the call sign HK7HM.

Initial broadcasts used a 90-watt transmitter manufactured by the priest's brother. In 1948, General Electric donated 100 radio sets and a 250-watt transmitter and, years later, donated a 1 kW transmitter. By 1978, Radio Sutatenza was the largest Latin American radio network for rural education, with a power of 600 kW.

It started with programs where the farmers performed local music. Later, Father Salcedo, with the support of a Catholic organization called Acción Cultural Popular – ACPO – and the rural community, developed a series of courses on math, writing, agricultural instruction, health and sanitation, among other subjects that aimed to diminish illiteracy and improve farmers' life quality. Even though it was not a Catholic radio, it was mainly funded by the Church and it was blessed by Pope Paul VI during his papal visit to Colombia in 1968. Radio Sutatenza freely talked about topics that were not strictly within the church's ideas, such as family planning.

Radio Sutatenza grew to the point where it aired 19 hours of educational programs per day, covering 687 towns and four main Colombian cities at the time. It distributed 6,453,937 handbooks, answered 1,229,552 letters from students, it created a weekly newspaper called El Campesino, and educated about 8,000,000 farmers around the country. It also became a model for other rural education initiatives in Latin America, such as Fundación Radio Escuela para el Desarrollo Rural (FREDER) in Osorno, Chile; Instituto de Cultura Popular (INCUPO) in Reconquista, Argentina; Escuelas Radiofónicas Populares de Ecuador (ERPE); Radio Onda Azul in Puno, Perú; Asociación Cultural Loyola (ACLO) in Sucre, Bolivia; Radio Occidente in Tovar, Venezuela, and Escuelas Radiofónicas de Nicaragua.

Despite its important role in improving the education of millions of people, by the late 1980s Radio Sutatenza was on the verge of bankruptcy and ended being sold in March 1989, with its powerful transmitters, to Caracol Radio, the largest radio network in Colombia. The last broadcast was made on 17 February 1990. The rest of the literacy project by ACPO folded by 1994.

== Stations ==
As of July 1969:

- Bogotá: 810 kHz AM (HJGL, 300 kW), covering Central Colombia (Cundinamarca, Caldas, Risaralda, Quindío, Boyacá, Santander, Tolima, Huila, and Meta)
- Barranquilla: 960 kHz AM (120 kW), covering northern Colombia (Atlántico, Bolívar, Córdoba, Sucre, Cesar, Magdalena, Norte de Santander)
- Medellín: 590 kHz AM (HJCR, 10 kW), covering Antioquia, Caldas, and Chocó.
- Cali: 700 kHz AM (HJCX, 120 kW), covering western Colombia (Valle del Cauca, Cauca, Huila, Risaralda, Caldas, and Nariño)
- Shortwave stations:
  - 5.075 MHz (25 kW)
  - 5.095 MHz (50 kW)
  - 6.075 MHz (10 kW)
