= Inés García de Durán =

- Born: Inés García Salas; June 26, 1928; Neiva, Huila
- Origin: Huila, Colombia
- Died: July 7, 2011 (aged 83)
- Occupation: Folklorist

Inés García de Durán (June 26, 1928 – July 7, 2011) was a Colombian folklorist linked specially to the traditions of her native land, the Huila Department. She founded the Departmental Dance School and taught in the Departmental Music Conservatory. She is notable for having created the choreography for El Sanjuanero, Huila's most famous dance and one of Colombia's best known tunes. Neiva's International Dance Encounter Inés García Durán was named in her honour. She is the daughter of a prominent engineer and politician Joaquín García Borrero.

== Personal life ==
In 1950 she married Ernesto Durán Cordovez and had three children. She was a friend of prominent local and national figures such as musician Jorge Villamil, and politicians Rodrigo Lara Bonilla and Guillermo Plazas Alcid.
