= Moisés Torrealba =

Venezuelan musician (born 1978)

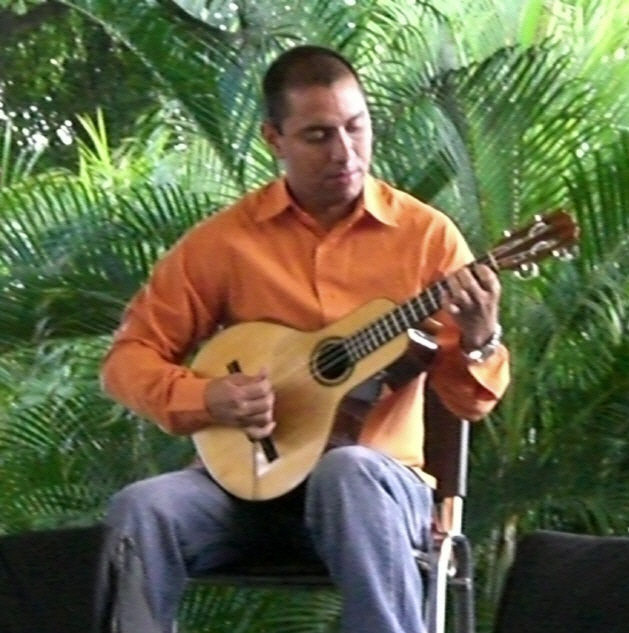

Background information
- Born: January 5, 1978 (age 48); Barinas, Venezuela
- Genre: Venezuelan folk music
- Occupations: Musician, bandola executant
- Instrument: Bandola llanera

Moisés Torrealba (born January 5, 1978) is a Venezuelan musician.

== Travel ==
He has toured in countries including Norway, France, London, Spain, Brazil, Curaçao and Colombia.

== See also ==
- Bandola
- Venezuelan music
