= Purificación, Tolima =

- Municipality and town
- Flag Coat of arms
- Nicknames: Puri, villa de las palmas (palm tree town)
- Location of the municipality and town of Purificación, Tolima in the Tolima Department of Colombia.
- Coordinates: 3°51′31″N 74°55′50″W
- Country: Colombia
- Department: Tolima Department
- Province: Southeastern
- Established: May 25th 1664

Government
  - 2020: Cristián Andrés Barragán

Area
  - Total: 422 km^{2} (163 sq mi)
- Elevation: 329 m (1,079 ft)

Population (2017)
  - Total: 29,539
- Time zone: UTC-5 (Colombia Standard Time)

Purificación is a town and municipality in the Tolima department of Colombia.

== Climate ==
Climate data for Purificacion (Lozania), elevation 400 m (1,300 ft), (1981–2010)
Month	Jan	Feb	Mar	Apr	May	Jun	Jul	Aug	Sep	Oct	Nov	Dec	Year
Mean daily maximum °C (°F)	32.2 (90.0)	32.3 (90.1)	32.1 (89.8)	31.4 (88.5)	31.3 (88.3)	31.5 (88.7)	32.1 (89.8)	33.2 (91.8)	32.8 (91.0)	31.7 (89.1)	31.3 (88.3)	31.5 (88.7)	32.0 (89.6)
Daily mean °C (°F)	26.5 (79.7)	26.6 (79.9)	26.5 (79.7)	26.2 (79.2)	26.2 (79.2)	26.0 (78.8)	26.0 (78.8)	26.6 (79.9)	26.7 (80.1)	26.3 (79.3)	26.3 (79.3)	26.4 (79.5)	26.4 (79.5)
Mean daily minimum °C (°F)	20.7 (69.3)	20.7 (69.3)	20.8 (69.4)	21.4 (70.5)	20.8 (69.4)	20.2 (68.4)	19.9 (67.8)	19.9 (67.8)	20.2 (68.4)	20.9 (69.6)	21.0 (69.8)	21.0 (69.8)	20.6 (69.1)
Average precipitation mm (inches)	119.6 (4.71)	146.8 (5.78)	215.9 (8.50)	231.7 (9.12)	193.7 (7.63)	85.2 (3.35)	49.7 (1.96)	53.7 (2.11)	135.8 (5.35)	288.6 (11.36)	280.0 (11.02)	186.9 (7.36)	1,976.5 (77.81)
Average precipitation days	11	13	16	18	18	14	11	9	13	19	18	15	175
Average relative humidity (%)	80	80	82	84	84	82	79	75	77	81	83	82	80
Source: Instituto de Hidrologia Meteorologia y Estudios Ambientales

Climate data for Purificación (Sta Helena), elevation 300 m (980 ft), (1981–2010)
Month	Jan	Feb	Mar	Apr	May	Jun	Jul	Aug	Sep	Oct	Nov	Dec	Year
Mean daily maximum °C (°F)	32.9 (91.2)	33.1 (91.6)	32.7 (90.9)	31.7 (89.1)	31.7 (89.1)	32.2 (90.0)	33.1 (91.6)	34.1 (93.4)	33.3 (91.9)	31.9 (89.4)	31.5 (88.7)	31.9 (89.4)	32.5 (90.5)
Daily mean °C (°F)	27.9 (82.2)	27.8 (82.0)	27.7 (81.9)	27.1 (80.8)	27.1 (80.8)	27.3 (81.1)	27.6 (81.7)	28.3 (82.9)	27.9 (82.2)	27.0 (80.6)	27.0 (80.6)	27.3 (81.1)	27.5 (81.5)
Mean daily minimum °C (°F)	22.9 (73.2)	22.9 (73.2)	23.0 (73.4)	22.9 (73.2)	22.7 (72.9)	22.3 (72.1)	21.8 (71.2)	22.2 (72.0)	22.6 (72.7)	22.5 (72.5)	22.6 (72.7)	22.8 (73.0)	22.6 (72.7)
Average precipitation mm (inches)	89.9 (3.54)	118.7 (4.67)	155.4 (6.12)	230.3 (9.07)	210.3 (8.28)	82.1 (3.23)	57.0 (2.24)	52.0 (2.05)	141.5 (5.57)	228.0 (8.98)	193.5 (7.62)	142.0 (5.59)	1,696.5 (66.79)
Average precipitation days	8	10	12	17	17	10	8	7	11	16	15	11	141
Average relative humidity (%)	74	73	75	77	77	75	71	68	70	76	77	76	74
Mean monthly sunshine hours	127.1	107.3	102.3	99.0	124.0	168.0	182.9	192.2	159.0	111.6	105.0	120.9	1,599.3
Mean daily sunshine hours	4.1	3.8	3.3	3.3	4.0	5.6	5.9	6.2	5.3	3.6	3.5	3.9	4.4
Source: Instituto de Hidrologia Meteorologia y Estudios Ambientales
