= Ángel Medardo Luzuriaga =

Ecuadorian musical artist

Ángel Medardo Luzuriaga González (17 September 1937 – 19 June 2018) was an Ecuadorian musical artist, precursor of the Andean cumbia.

Luzuriaga was born in Loja on 17 September 1937, and in his music he extolled the beauty of the Ecuadorian territory, especially that of the province of Manabí. On 11 September 1967, he founded the orchestra "Don Medardo y sus Players", a group with which he released 105 albums. He died on 19 June 2018 in Quito.
