= Víctor Hugo Ayala =

Colombian singer (1934–2026)

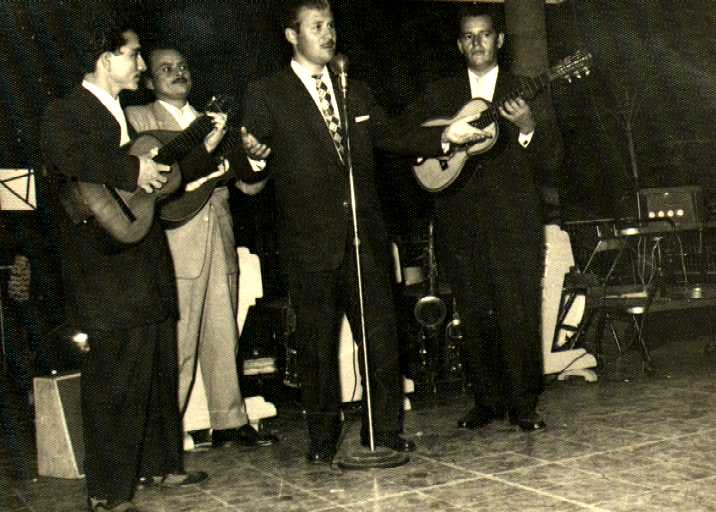
- Ayala performing in 1960

Background information
- Born: 13 June 1934; Bogotá, Colombia
- Died: 6 October 2026 (aged 92) Bogotá, Colombia

Víctor Hugo Ayala (13 June 1934 – 6 October 2026) was a Colombian singer. He is known for his bolero records, particularly "Si Te Vuelvo a Besar", and for his performance of the Colombian national anthem.

== Life and career ==
Víctor Hugo Ayala was born in Bogotá on 13 June 1934. His mother was Leonor Caro. Ayala attended school in Bogotá, and studied architecture for five semesters at a state university. He worked in the Colombian Navy as an architectural draughtsman.

Ayala started singing in competitions on radio shows, and won first prize in one on Radio Santa Fe. In 1951 he started singing regularly on Radio Santa Fe, and on stations La Voz de Colombia and Nueva Granada (where he was accompanied by Jaime Llano González). He was then invited by Hernán Restrepo Duque to record for Sonolux; his first record was the bolero "Camino Verde", and his second was "La Quiero Porque la Quiero". Ayala came to prominence at a time when imports of several luxuries, including foreign-made LPs, were tightly controlled in Colombia. As a result, along with Alberto Granados and Alberto Osorio, he benefitted from improved sales of records in foreign styles like bolero.

He recorded more than 20 LPs with labels including Sonolux, RCA Victor, Philips, and Discos Orbe, and recorded songs in six languages. He is particularly known for his version of "Si Te Vuelvo a Besar" by Jaime Llano González, and for performing the Colombian national anthem, which for some years he sang every 31 December as part of the end-of-year celebrations on Colombian television. Other songs notably recorded by Ayala include "Qué Fácil Fue Olvidarte", "Un Compromiso", "Fuego en el Alma", "Ayer Me Echaron del Pueblo", and "Por Si no te Vuelvo".

Ayala died in Bogotá on 6 October 2026, at the age of 92.
