= Jaime Llano González =

Colombian musician and composer

- Also known as: The Organist with the Silken Hands
- Born: 5 June 1932; Titiribí, Colombia
- Died: 6 November 2017 (aged 85) Bogotá, Colombia
- Years active: 1950s–2012

Jaime Llano González (Note: In this Spanish name, the first or paternal surname is Llano and the second or maternal family name is González.) (1932–2017), was a Colombian organist and composer. He regularly appeared on Colombian television and radio throughout his career, and his skill on the organ earned him the nickname "The Organist with the Silken Hands" (Spanish: El Organista de las Manos de Seda).

== Biography ==
=== Early life and education ===
Jaime Llano González was born on 5 June 1932 in Titiribí, in the Colombian department of Antioquia. His mother was Magdalena González, a piano teacher, and his father was Luis Eduardo Llano. He attended secondary school at the Pontifical Bolivarian University and studied undergraduate medicine at the University of Antioquia for two semesters.

Llano's mother taught him to play tiple and piano, and introduced him to the Colombian musical styles of pasillo and bambuco. He taught himself to play the organ, an instrument for which he later became famous.

=== Music career ===
Llano quit his university studies and moved to Bogotá in the 1950s. There he got his first regular music gig playing weekends at La Cabaña bar, with a group called the Conjunto Arepa. At La Cabaña he met Julio Sánchez Venegas, director of the radio station La Voz de Colombia, who took him to play on the radio, where he met Berenice Chavez and Oriol Rangel.

Llano appeared on television on 13 June 1954, during the first day of broadcasting of television in Colombia. He later regularly appeared on television programmes about Colombian music. In 1956 Llano became director of the Orquesta Nueva Granada, and for several years he performed alongside Oriol Rangel on Radio Santa Fe. Other artists that he played with include Víctor Hugo Ayala, Alberto Granados, Luis Uribe Bueno, José A. Morales, and Ruth Marulanda.

Llano's first record was released in 1961 on the label Vergara. He released over 60 albums in his career, some of which were duet albums with Oriol Rangel, including notably Inspiración (1964). He was known more for his skill at performance than composition, but he did write over 100 songs including "Si Te Vuelvo a Besar", "Titiribí", "Orgullo de Arriero", "Puntillazo", and "Ñito", in traditional Colombian styles.

=== Personal life and death ===
Llano married his wife Luz Aristizábal on 11 October 1954. They had 3 children: Jaime León, Luis Eduardo, and María Elena.

Llano stopped making music when he was diagnosed with a blood clot in the brain in 2012. He developed Alzheimer's in the final years of his life, and died on 6 November 2017 in Bogotá.
