= Radio Santa Fe =

Colombia
- Broadcast area: Bogotá
- Frequency: 1070 kHz
- Branding: HJCG

Programming
- Format: News / talk / music

Ownership
- Owner: Caracol Radio

History
- First air date: 1 April 1938

Links
- Website: http://www.radiosantafe.com/

Radio Santa Fe is a radio station in Bogotá, Colombia, founded 1 April 1938 by Hernando Bernal Andrade and his wife Luisa Mahe. The station broadcasts news and talk, with some music programmes.

Bernal purchased a communications system from a crashed airplane, repaired it and with his wife bought a house in Centenario, a neighbourhood in southern Bogotá, where the first broadcasts of Radio Santa Fe started. Radio Santa Fe was one of the first commercial radio stations in Colombia. After Bernal's sudden death in 1962, at age 42, Ms. Mahé and their four children have been in charge of the station.

In 2013, Radio Santa Fe signed an agreement with Caracol Radio in order to become part of the short-lived Q'Hubo Radio network (Q'Hubo is a tabloid newspaper with quasi-nationalwide distribution). It switched back to «La 1070 AM de Radio Santa Fe» in late 2016, still operated by Caracol Radio.

Between 1998 and 2013, Radio Santa Fe owned HJN86, an FM station in Pasto, at 100,1 MHz. In 2013, with the aforementioned agreement with Caracol Radio, it became an affiliate of Tropicana Estéreo.
