= Caracol Radio =

Radio network in Colombia

Coordinates: 4.598056°N 74.075833°W

- Colombia
- Broadcast area: Colombia
- Frequencies: List of frequencies
- Branding: HJCY (AM), HJGL (FM)

Programming
- Format: News / talk

Ownership
- Owner: Grupo PRISA

History
- First air date: 1935 (as La voz de Antioquia) 1948 (as Emisoras Nuevo Mundo)
- Former call signs: HJKC
- Former frequencies: 850 kHz (1948–1990)

Links
- Website: caracol.com.co

Caracol Radio (Cadena Radial Colombiana, "Colombian Radio Network") is one of the main radio networks in Colombia. Founded in Medellín in 1948 when La Voz de Antioquia station acquired the 50% of Emisoras Nuevo Mundo, based in Bogotá.

Julio Mario Santo Domingo was its main shareholder until 2003, when Spanish Grupo Prisa bought the Grupo Latino de Radio, whose 17% was Santo Domingo's.

== History ==
In 1945 Colombian Liberal Party politicians César García, Jorge Soto del Corral, Luis Uribe Piedrahita, Alberto Arango Tavera, Carlos Sanz Santamaría, José Gómez Pinzón, Alfonso López Pumarejo, and Alfonso López Michelsen created Sociedad Radiodifusión Interamericana, which would create the Emisora Nuevo Mundo in Bogotá. On 3 September 1948, La Voz de Antioquia acquired the 50% of Emisora Nuevo Mundo. Caracol would be legally founded in 1949. Coltejer, a textile company which had invested in La Voz de Antioquia and Emisoras Nuevo Mundo, would own some shares until 1959.

In the 1950s, the network expanded when Emisoras Fuentes (Cartagena de Indias), Emisoras Unidas (Barranquilla) and RCO Radiodifusora de Occidente (Cali) became affiliates. In 1952 Caracol would create a second station, Radio Reloj, which would become the first station with an all-music format, with a time mention between songs. In 1956, Caracol owned and operated four stations: La Voz de Antioquia (Compañía Colombiana de Radiodifusión, Medellín, HJDM, currently Radio Reloj Medellín), La Voz del Río Cauca (Cali, currently Caracol Cali, HJED), Emisoras Nuevo Mundo and Radio Reloj. The first three created in 1956 the so-called Triángulo de Oro ("Gold triangle"), with 50 kW each, in order to broadcast the Vuelta a Colombia. La Voz del Río Cauca could be heard as far as Argentina. In 1960, Fernando Londoño Henao, a prominent member of the Colombian Conservative Party, became its president.

Between 1958 and 1963, Caracol would acquire several stations, such as Emisora Mil 20, Emisoras Eldorado and La Voz de Colombia (Bogotá), Radio Reloj (Panama), Sociedad Informativa de Contrapunto, La Voz del Café (Pereira), Pregones del Quindío (Armenia), Radio Comercio (Bucaramanga), and Radio Visión (Medellín), and absorb small networks as Cadena Radial Andina and Sociedad Nacional de Radiodifusión. In 2003, Caracol TV was spun off from Caracol Radio. In 1970 it would acquire exclusive broadcasting rights for the 1970 FIFA World Cup in Mexico.

In 1986 Caracol Radio would rent the stations of the Núcleo Radial Bienvenida. In the same year Julio Mario Santo Domingo would acquire the 50% of both Caracol Radio and Caracol TV, with 25% belonging to Alfonso López Michelsen, and the other 25% for the family of Fernando Londoño Henao. In 1990, it acquired Radio Sutatenza, a network of educational radio stations founded in 1947 which was having financial problems. Radio Sutatenza was the only network in Colombia with transmitters over 50 kW.

On 12 August 2010 at 05:30 (10:30 UTC), a car bomb exploded outside the headquarters of the network, which did not interrupt its broadcast, despite having its building's tiles and windows shattered. FARC were held responsible for the attack.

=== Merger with W Radio ===
As of January 13, 2026, it merged with W Radio to create the station called W Caracol or La W de Caracol. This was done to expand its news coverage and information resources throughout the country.

== Radio Stations ==
=== Current ===
Music Radio Stations

Radio Station	Main Style
Caracol Estéreo	Contemporary adult
Tropicana	Various genres (Mixed/Tropical)
Los 40	Pop hits, reggaeton, Latin pop
Bésame Radio	Pop and Romantic Ballads
Radioacktiva	Rock, metal and punk

General programming stations

Radio Station	Main Style	Coverage / Signal
Caracol Colombia	News, talk radio, analysis, music	National basic chain
Radio Santa Fe	News, popular, ranchera, regional Mexican, sports	AM (currently operated by Caracol)

Sports programming station

Radio Station	Main Style	Coverage / Signal
AS Colombia	sports	AM - FM

== Disappeared radio stations ==
Radio Station	Operating Period	Grades
Mil 20	1958–1991	The country's first record-playing radio station.
Radio Visión	1964–1987	
Tropical de Oro	1982–1989	
Radio Deportes	1983–2001	
Nota Estéreo	1987–1989	
Musicar FM	1984–1993	In partnership with Carvajal S.A.
Bienvenida Estéreo	1986–1992	Precursor of the Tropicana Stereo System.
Radionet	1997–2004	First 24-hour radio station dedicated to real-time news.
Corazón AM	1989–1997	
Corazón Estéreo	1998–2001	
Radio 15	1963–1977	
La Deportiva	2001	
La Vallenata	1994–2016	
Radio Recuerdos	1985–2012	
Oxígeno	1998–2022	
Los 40 Urban	2022–2023	
Colorín ColorRadio	1992–2013	First children's programming station in the country.
Q'hubo Radio	2013–2023	
Radio Mercadeo	1995–1998	The first 24-hour radio station dedicated to selling products and services. It operated on 1220 AM.
Radio Reloj	1951–2008	
W Radio	2003–2026	Contemporary and informative broadcaster, merged with the basic network since January 13, 2026.
W+	2020–2026	Classics from the 80s and 90s

== Frequencies ==
City	Department	AM Frequency (License Plate)	FM Frequency (Platform)
Bogotá	Bogotá D.C.	810 HJCY	100.9 HJGL
Medellín	Antioquia	750 HJDK	90.3 HJE27
Medellín	Antioquia	750 HJDK	102.9 HJE71
Arauca	Arauca		102.3 HJC34
Barranquilla	Atlántico	1100 HJAT	90.1 HJQU
Barranquilla	Atlántico	1100 HJAT	97.6 HJH26
Cartagena de Indias	Bolívar	1170 HJNW	107.5 HJA25
Magangué	Bolívar	960 HJND	
Tunja	Boyacá	1120 HJKQ	99.3 HJCW
Nobsa	Boyacá		107.3 HJB86
Duitama	Boyacá	1150 HJGJ	107.3 HJB86
Manizales	Caldas	1180 HJFX	101.7 HJB62
Popayán	Cauca	1330 HJLS	98.1 HJK40
Montería	Cordoba	1310 HJDG	107.5 HJA21
Neiva	Huila	1010 HJJR	105.1 HJM65
Neiva	Huila	1210 HJFR	105.1 HJM65
Santa Marta	Magdalena	890 HJPM	101.1 HJA79
Villavicencio	Meta		102.3 HJN24
Pasto	Nariño	1280 HJLR	97.1 HJD32
Cúcuta	Norte de Santander	1090 HJBC	99.9 HJO65
Cúcuta	Norte de Santander	1250 HJHS	99.9 HJO65
Armenia	Quindío	1150 HJFI	106.4 HJO84
Pereira	Risaralda	950 HJFN	88.7 HJB23
San Andrés	San Andrés and Providencia	1260 HJHU	
Bucaramanga	Santander	880 HJGE	99.2 HJP29
Bucaramanga	Santander	880 HJGE	90.7 HJQ72
Sincelejo	Sucre		100.3 HJP69
Sincelejo	Sucre		103.5 HJL40
Sincelejo	Sucre		106.3 HJB59
Ibagué	Tolima	1260 HJCO	96.3 HJB81
Cali	Valle del Cauca	820 HJED	90.5 HJAF
Cali	Valle del Cauca	700 HJCX	95.5 HJMQ
International frequencies
Miami, Estados Unidos	Florida		106.3 WRAZ Caracol América

=== Affiliated Broadcasters ===
Name	City	Department	AM Frequency (License Plate)	FM Frequency (Platform)
La Voz de Amalfi	Amalfi	Antioquia	1460 HJMU	
Apartadó Stereo	Apartadó	Antioquia		103.3 HJB70
Radio Son Oriente	Sonsón	Antioquia	1490 HJTC	
La Voz del Cinaruco	Arauca	Arauca	1050 HJE73	
Tropicana	Yopal	Casanare		106.3 HJB20
La Voz de Marquezote	Valledupar	Cesar		103.9 HJA50
Platino Stereo	Condoto	Chocó		102.3 HJB76
Caracol Girardot	Girardot	Cundinamarca	1230 HJTP	
Armoníaz	Zipaquirá	Cundinamarca	1600 HJHV	
Caracol Guaviare	San José del Guaviare	Guaviare		102.3 HJYA
Guaviare Stereo	Calamar	Guaviare		92.7 HJM37
Tropicana	Pitalito	Huila		101.8 HJM68
Cardenal Stereo	Riohacha	La Guajira		91.7 HJM30
Planeta Radio	El Banco	Magdalena		106.1 HJC46
La Voz de los Centauros	Villavicencio	Meta	1140 HJE67	
Radio Caracol Ipiales	Ipiales	Nariño	1400 HJJJ	
Tropicana	Ipiales	Nariño		93.1 HJN51
Radio Catatumbo	Ocaña	Norte de Santander	1150 HJBT	
Maguaré Stereo	Mocoa	Putumayo		89.3 HJO66
La Voz del Petróleo	Barrancabermeja	Santander	1540 HJHD	
Sonora Stereo	Cimitarra	Santander		96.7 HJO97
Voces Rovirenses	Málaga	Santander	1560 HJHE	
Radio Palmira	Palmira	Valle del Cauca	1050 HJNG	
Caracol Sevilla	Sevilla	Valle del Cauca	1530 HJEU	

== See also ==
- WSUA - Radio Caracol's sister network in Miami
