= Guabina =

Guabina is a rhythm from the Andean mountains in Colombia. The word "Guabina" refers to the musical style, as well as a type of fish or a tool used to control domestic animals. The features of this music are based on dances and lifestyles of the people from Antioquia, Santander, Boyacá, Cundinamarca, Tolima, and, Huila. The Guabina rhythm includes dancers, but it may be played without them. There is a version of the Guabina that is played faster and is called Torbellino.Another type of Guabina, known as guabina-torbellino, is a mixture of the instrumental torbellino and the sung guabina, particularly in its a cappella format. Guabina is most popular in rural communities.

Interludes in Guabina songs are often absolutely vocal without any accompaniment. It's a lyrical lament, coplas performed repetitively by labores (laborers) and travelers. And as a rhythm section includes string instruments such as requinto, tiple, and guitar and sometimes bandolas. Some regions incorporate cane flute and hand percussion instruments such as: chucho, carraca, quiribillo, carraca de burro, and puerca.

Some of the most traditional Guabina songs are: "Guabina chiquinquireña” by Alberto Urdaneta, "Mi Guabinita" by Octavio Quiñones, "Sogamoseñita" and "Paisaje boyacense" by Juan C. Goyeneche, "Lagunita de mi pueblo" by Juan Francisco Aguilera. This rhythm has its own music festival called the Festival Nacional de la Guabina y el Tiple, celebrated in August in the city of Velez, Santander department.

== Most famous Guabina songs ==
In this genre the most important national composition is "Guabina Chiquinquirena" by Alberto Urdaneta and Daniel Bayona. in its traditional version performed by a traditional band like, Guabina @Zikha Hall Open House. There are other samples of music from Tolima Grande as "Guabina Huilense" by Carlos E. Cortes, or "La Suite Colombiana No. 1 – III Guabina" by Gentil Montana, and the Guabina Santandereana (#2) by Lelio Olarte Pardo. Among the new singer-songwriters of Guabina is John Jairo Torres de la Pava from Antioquia.

== History ==
History references Guabina from the end of the 18th century, becoming more popular among potters and singers from Santander during Christmas holidays, and farmers’ parties. This music was rejected by the Church due to the close physical contact of the dancers. From the second half of the 19th century, romanticism was an essential part in Guabina compositions. That is when Guabina lyrics started to become romantic and amorous like Alberto Urdaneta's composition "Guabina Chiquinquirena".

Various composers from Boyaca had been using Guabina as background music for songs about the land, for example Octavio Quinones with "Mi Guabinita", Juan C. Goyeneche with "Sogamosenita" and "Paisaje Boyacense", and Juan Francisco Aguilera with "Lagunita de mi pueblo".

It's important to mention the great musician and composer Maestro Lelio Olarte Pardo from Puente Nacional, composer of "Guabina Santandereana No. 1 and 2". No. 2 is more popular since it has formed part of the repertoire of many Colombian music albums and has been performed by The Colombian Symphony Orchestra, and by some bands which have won contests in Paipa, Boyaca.

== Instruments ==
The basic instruments to perform Guabina are tiple, carraca, capador, pandereta, requinto, esterilla, bandola and chucho or alfandoque.
