= Bandola =

Pear-shaped box lute

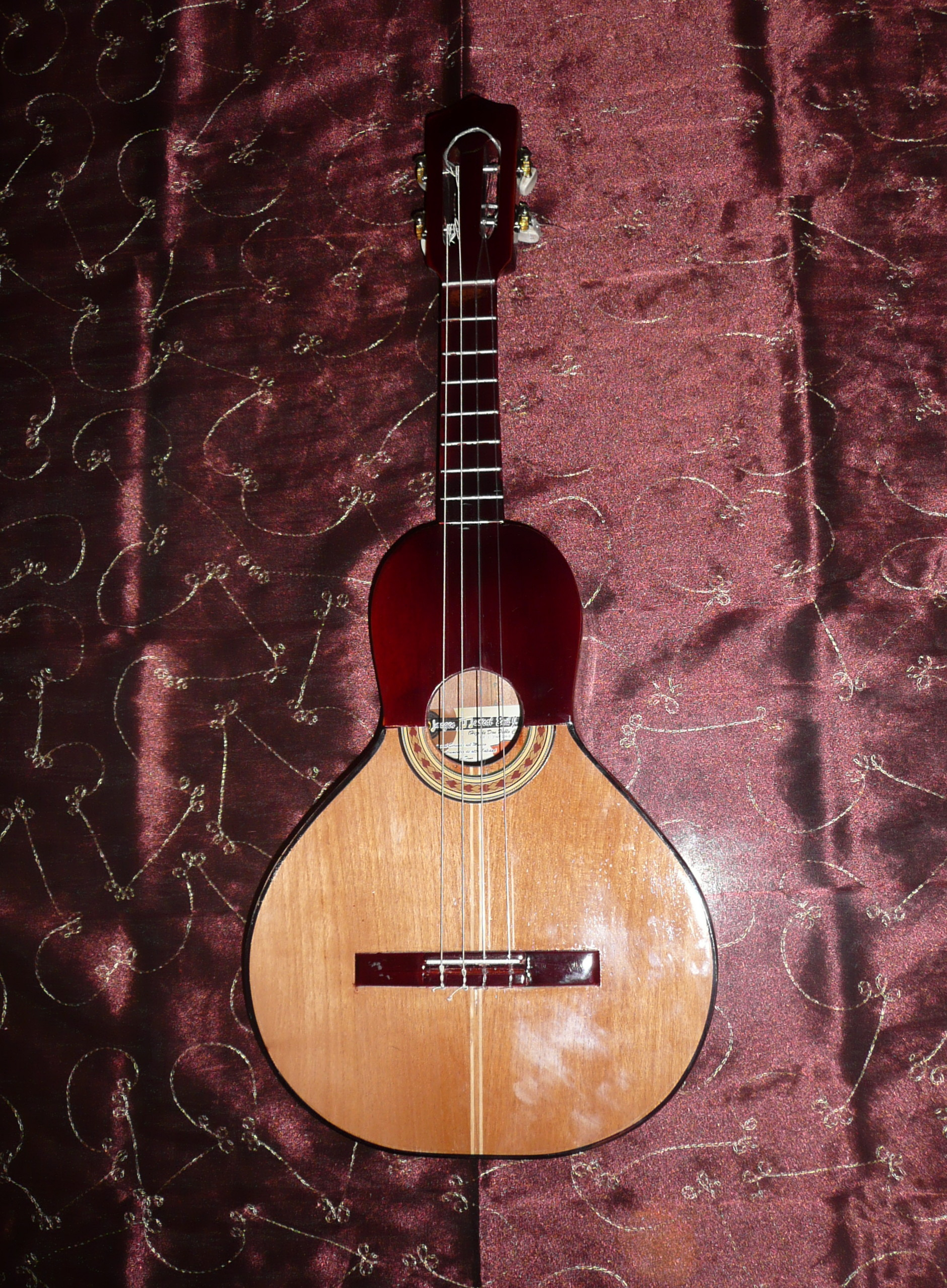
- Bandola llanera
- Classification: String instrument (plucked)
- Hornbostel–Sachs classification: 321.322 (Composite chordophone)

Related instruments
- List: Bandurria; Mandolin; Mandola; Octavina

The bandola is one of many varieties of small pear-shape chordophones found in Venezuela and Colombia. They are related to the bandurria and mandolin.

== Traditional varieties ==
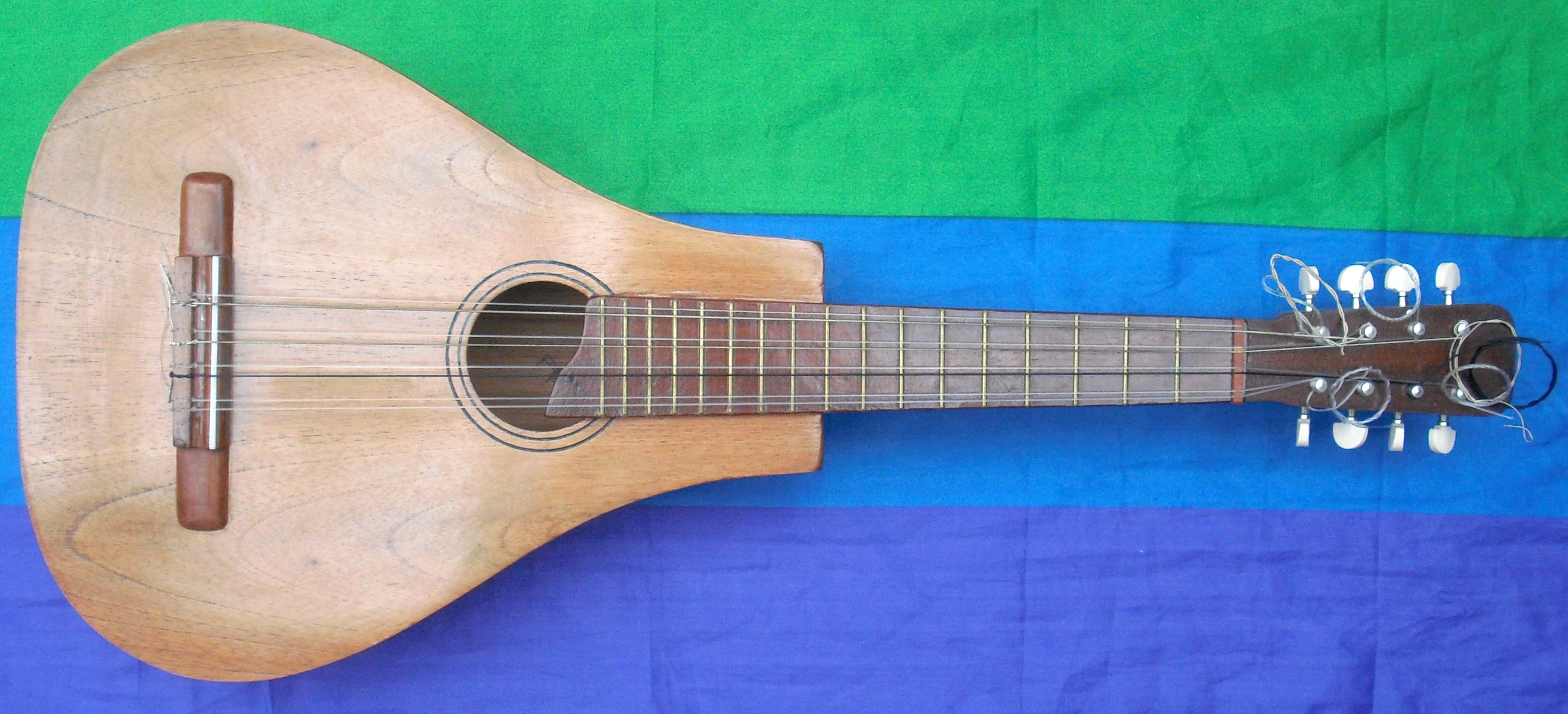
Bandola Oriental

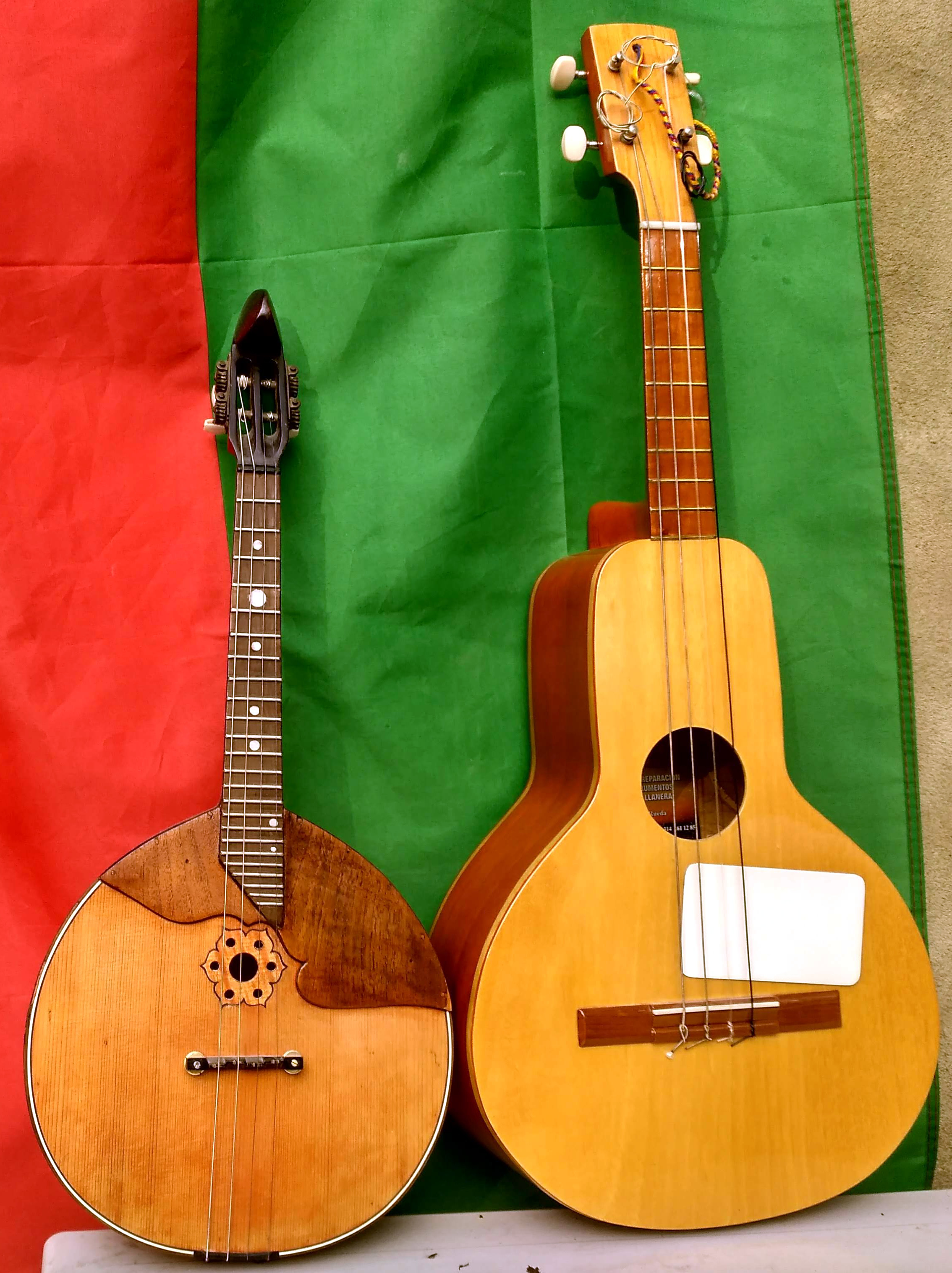
Domra (left) and Bandola Llanera (right)

Instruments known as bandola include:

- Bandola llanera: traditionally built with only seven frets and four gut strings and played with a pick in the music of Joropo llanero, many bandolas being made nowadays can have up to 21 frets, with musicians such as Saúl Vera, Moisés Torrealba Franco Bortolotti and Mafer Bandola using these more extensively fretted versions. The strings used to string the bandola llanera nowadays are usually taken from classical guitar sets; most commonly the wound E and A, and the nylon G and B strings. The bandola is today undergoing a resurgence, with the instrument gaining popularity in both Venezuela and Colombia, as well as North America and Europe. The instrument was in danger of extinction in the first half of the 20th century until Anselmo Lopez (b.1934 Barinas Venezuela, d.2016 Barinas Venezuela) adapted techniques from the classical guitar, most famously the "segundeo", in order to give the instrument what is today considered to be its characteristic sound. The segundeo involves using the nails of the index or middle finger in an upward motion to clip one of the strings below the one being struck by the plectrum, producing a percussive sound.
- Bandola andina colombiana: this instrument has six courses of strings in several different arrangements. It may have 12 strings in doubled courses, 14 strings with the first two courses tripled and the rest doubled, 16 strings with the first four courses tripled and the last two doubled, or 18 strings in triple courses. The instrument strongly resembles its ancestor, the Spanish bandurria. This instrument resembles the Mexican bandolón.
- Bandola oriental: like the bandola llanera but with a deeper body and four double courses with eight strings in all, with both nylon and metal strings.
- Bandola guayanesa: played in Venezuela's Guayana Region, with eight metal strings, paired in four courses. The instrument combines techniques of the oriental and llanera bandolas.
- Bandola Andina or Bandola Aymara or Peruvian Bandola or Bolivian Bandola: These have 4 courses of triple, or sometimes quadruple strings.

== Modern varieties ==
- Luís Alberto Paredes Rodríguez and Manuel Bernal Martínez build a range of bandola bajo ("bass bandola"). These instruments have 12 strings in six courses and a fanned fretboard.
- Some mandolin players convert their instruments to a bandola oriental by adding a fixed bridge and stringing with nylon strings.

== See also ==
- Venezuelan music
