= Bambuco =

Music genre originating from Colombian and Venezuelan Andes

Danza Del Bambuco
- Stylistic origins: Basque folk, European Waltz, Indigenous Music
- Cultural origins: 19th and 20th centuries in the Andean Region of Colombia

Subgenres
- Sanjuanero - Bambuco Fiestero

Fusion genres
- Bambuco Jazz

Bambuco is a traditional music genre from Colombia. Its metric structure is similar to the European waltz or polska (not to be confused with the polka). Typically a bambuco piece is accompanied by a stylized group dance in either a 6/8 or 3/4 meter.

Bambuco took a cultural foothold in the Andean region of Colombia and has spread in popularity throughout Latin America. The Festival Folclórico y Reinado Nacional del Bambuco in Neiva is a festival celebrating bambuco music.

"Cuatro Preguntas" is one of the most famous songs in the genre, having been included by El Tiempo at No. 8 on its list of the 50 best Colombian songs of all time.
