= 2003 in Colombia =

- Decades: 1980s; 1990s; 2000s; 2010s; 2020s
- See also: Other events of 2003; Timeline of Colombian history

Events from the year 2003 in Colombia.

== Incumbents ==
- President: Álvaro Uribe Vélez (2002 – 2010).
- Vice President: Francisco Santos Calderón (2002 – 2010).

== Events ==
=== January ===
- 15 January – President Uribe requests military assistance from the United States similar to that of the Iraq War.

=== February ===
- 6 February – Social Protection Minister Juan Luis Londoño and four others die in a small plane crash near Tolima.
- 7 February – 2003 El Nogal Club bombing: A car bomb on the third floor of El Nogal Club in Bogotá filled with 200 kilograms (440 lb) of explosives is detonated, killing 36 and injuring more than 200.
- 13 February – United Nations Security Council Resolution 1465 is unanimously adopted, condemning the El Nogal Club bombing.
- 14 February:
  - 2003 Neiva bombing: A car bomb explodes near the Benito Salas Airport, killing 16 and injuring dozens more.
  - Two CIA operatives are captured by the Revolutionary Armed Forces of Colombia (FARC).

=== March ===
- 5 March – Seven people are killed in Cúcuta when a car bomb explodes.
- 18 March – The football club Bogotá F.C. is founded.

=== April ===
- 6 April – Radio journalist José Emeterio Rivas is murdered in Barrancabermeja after publicly accusing the local politicians of corruption, his body is found alongside that of Paolo César Montesinos, a student.
- 10 April – Mayor of El Roble Eudaldo Diaz's body is found beaten, tortured, and executed two months after he pleaded with President Uribe during a televised community meeting to save him from assassination. This came after he had accused Uribe's ally Salvador Arana and other politicians of paramilitary connections and corruption.
- 30 April – President Álvaro Uribe meets with U.S. President George W. Bush and press in the Oval Office of the White House in Washington, D.C.

=== May ===
- 5 May – Guillermo Gaviria Correa, Governor of Antioquia, Gilberto Echeverri Mejía, Minister of Defense, and eight soldiers who were kidnapped by the FARC's 34th Front are killed during a failed Army rescue operation in Urrao.

=== June ===
- 27 June – The 14th Andean Presidential Council is held in Rionegro, Carmen de Viboral, Antioquia at Recinto de Quirama. The presidents of Bolivia (Gonzalo Sánchez de Lozada), Colombia (Álvaro Uribe), Ecuador (Lucio Gutiérrez), and Venezuela (Hugo Chávez) as well as the vice president of Perú (Raúl Diez Canseco) attend.

=== July ===
- 8 July – Opération 14 juillet
- 15 July – The United Self-Defense Forces of Colombia (AUC) agrees to disband.
- 18 July – Manuel Octavio Bermúdez is arrested after the murder of Luis Carlos Gálvez.

=== August ===
- 30 August – The FARC releases a second proof of life to the family of kidnapped French-Colombian politician Ingrid Betancourt.

=== September ===
- 15 September – The National Liberation Army (ELN) kidnaps eight tourists from Ciudad Perdida.

=== October ===
- 25 October – 2003 Colombian constitutional referendum
- 26 October – The 2003 Fusagasugá City Council elections takes place, electing 17 council seats.

=== November ===
- 12 November – Miss Colombia 2003 takes place in Cartagena de Indias.
- 15 November – 2003 Zona Rosa attacks: Grenades are thrown into two bars in the Zona Rosa neighborhood in Bogotá, killing one and injuring 73.

=== December ===
- 28 December – A judicial assistant for the Prosecutor's Office in Chiquinquirá, Dora Inés Rodríguez, is murdered in her sleep.
- 30 December – A 50 kilograms (110 lb) car bomb is neutralized in the Puerto Jordán district of Tame, Arauca by the 18th Brigade of the Military Forced of Colombia.

=== Uncertain ===
- The Democratic Colombia Party is founded.

== Deaths ==
- 3 February – Fulgencio Berdugo, football player (b. 1918).
- 6 April – José Emeterio Rivas, radio journalist (b.1957/8).
- 25 April – Jaime Silva Gómez, football player (b. 1935).
- 18 June – Rafael Mejía Romani, musician and songwriter (b. 1920).
- 17 July – Francisco Rada, accordionist and songwriter (b. 1907).
- 30 July – Carlos Lemos Simmonds, politician, former vice president (1996–1998) (b. 1933).
- 27 September – Colacho Mendoza, vallenato accordionist (b. 1936).
- 21 October – Juan Harvey Caicedo, actor and radio personality (b.1937).
- 12 November – Jesús Manuel Estrada, vallenato singer (b. 1963).
