= 2011 in Colombia =

- Decades: 1990s; 2000s; 2010s; 2020s
- See also: Other events of 2011; Timeline of Colombian history

Events in the year 2011 in Colombia.

== Incumbents ==
- President: Juan Manuel Santos Calderón (2010-2018)
- Vice President: Angelino Garzón (2010–2014)

== Events ==
=== Ongoing ===
- Colombian conflict

=== January ===
- 9 January – The Reinado Internacional del Café 2011 is held in Manizales.

=== April ===
- 23 April – 2011 Colombia floods: A state of emergency is declared.

=== May ===
- 30 May – The Revolutionary Armed Forces of Colombia (FARC) reportedly killed two mayoral candidates in the municipality of Campamento in the Antioquia department.

=== October ===
- President Santos dissolves National Intelligence Service.
- 12 October – The 2011 Colombian student protests begin.
- 30 October – The 2011 Colombian regional and municipal elections are held.

=== November ===
- 4 November – Top FARC leader Guillermo León Sáenz aka Alfonso Cano is killed by the Colombian army.
- 14 November – Miss Colombia 2011 is held.
- 26 November – The FARC reportedly kill four members of the Colombian Security Forces that were held captive for more than a decade.

== Deaths ==
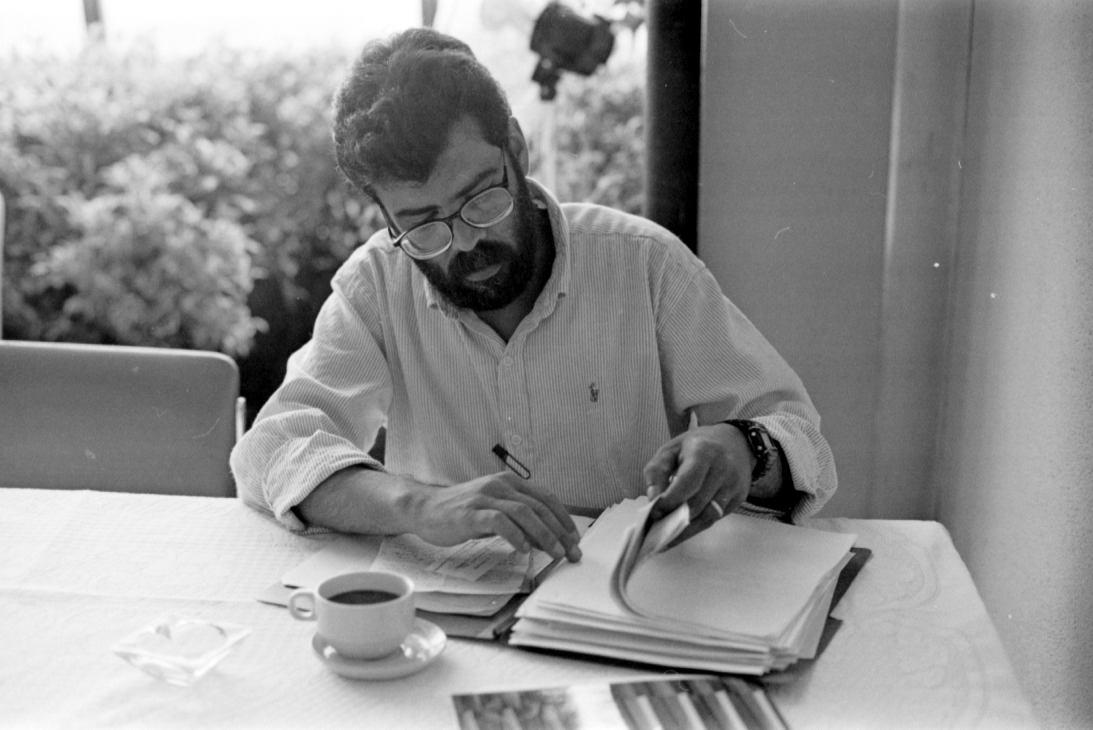
Alfonso Cano

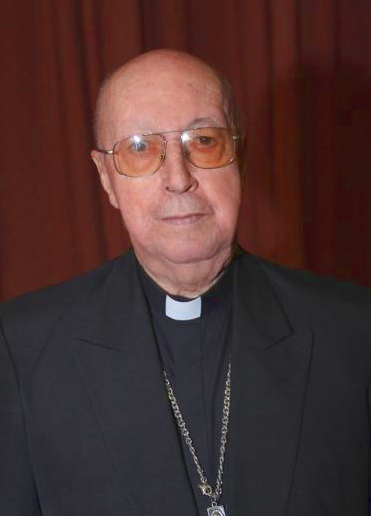
Hector Rueda

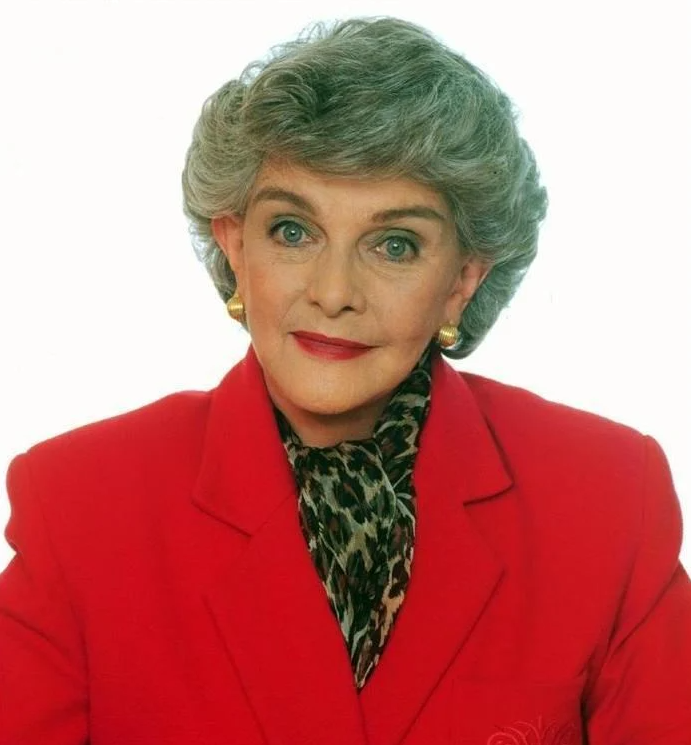
Gloria Valencia

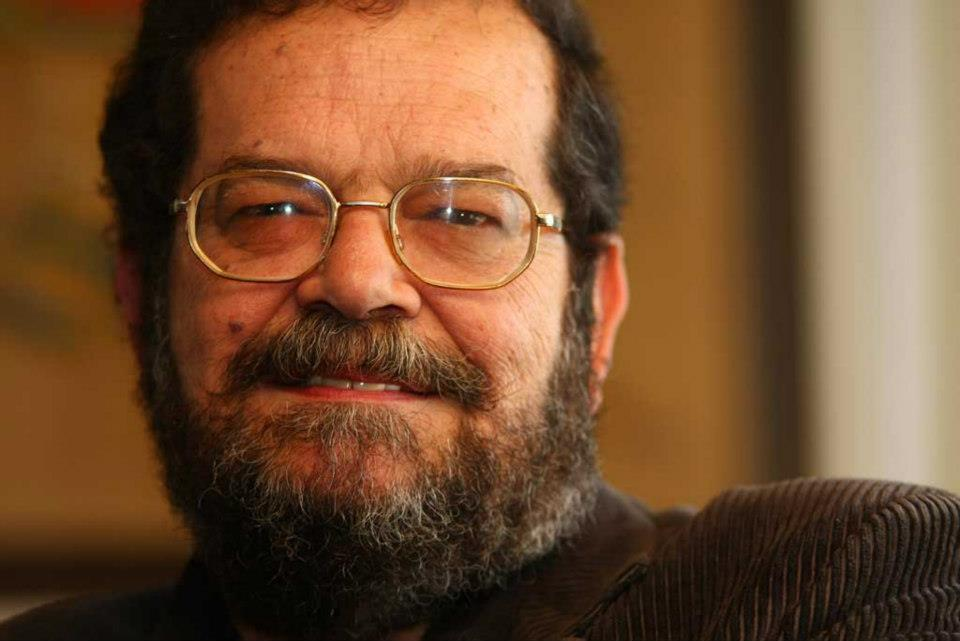
David Sanchez

=== January ===
- 31 January – Hernán Alvarado Solano, 65, Colombian Roman Catholic prelate, Vicar Apostolic of Guapi (b.1946).

=== February ===
- 7 February – Helenita Vargas, singer (b. 1934).
- 9 February:
  - Olga de Angulo, 55, Colombian Olympic swimmer (b.1955).
  - David Sánchez Juliao, 65, Colombian author (b. 1945).

=== March ===
- 24 March – Gloria Valencia de Castaño, 83, Colombian television host, respiratory failure (b. 1927).
- 28 March – Sonia Osorio, 83, Colombian ballet dancer and choreographer, respiratory failure (b.1928).

=== April ===
- 19 April – Rafael Salas, 58, vallenato accordionist.

=== May ===
- 5 May – Salomón Hakim, 88, Colombian neurosurgeon, researcher, and inventor (b. 1922).
- 11 May – Dolores Salinas, singer and songwriter (b. 1933)
- 16 May – Francisco Zapata, musician (b. 1941).

=== June ===
- 14 June – Augusto Ramírez Ocampo, 77, Colombian politician, Mayor of Bogotá (1982–1984), Foreign Minister (1984–1986), heart ailment (b. 1934).

=== July ===
- 26 July – Joe Arroyo, 55, Colombian singer (b. 1955).

=== September ===
- 2 September – Alberto Zalamea Costa, 82, Colombian journalist and politician, Ambassador to Côte d'Ivoire, Venezuela and Italy (b. 1929).

=== October ===
- 5 October – Níver Arboleda, 43, Colombian footballer, heart attack (b. 1967).
- 7 October – Julio Mario Santo Domingo, 88, Colombian businessman (b. 1923).
- 19 October – Édison Chará, 31, Colombian footballer, shot (b. 1980).
- 30 October – Boris de Greiff, 81, Colombian chess master (b. 1930).

=== November ===
- 1 November – Héctor Rueda Hernández, 90, Colombian Roman Catholic prelate, Archbishop of Medellín (b. 1920).
- 4 November – Guillermo León Sáenz, 63, revolutionary (b. 1948).
- 20 November – Fabio Betancur Tirado, 73, Colombian Roman Catholic prelate, Archbishop of Manizales (b. 1938).
- 23 November – Luis Fernando Jaramillo Correa, 76, Colombian politician, Minister of Foreign Affairs (b. 1935).
- 25 November – Libio José Martínez, military officer (b. 1976).

=== December ===
- 1 December – Wilson Choperena, 87, composer of the lyrics to "La Pollera Colorá" (b. 1923).
