= Zona Rosa attacks =

Zona Rosa attacks may refer to

- 1985 Zona Rosa attacks on 19 June 1985 in San Salvador, El Salvador
- 2003 Zona Rosa attacks on 12 November 2003 in Bogotá, Colombia
