= 2010 in Colombia =

- Decades: 1990s; 2000s; 2010s; 2020s
- See also: Other events of 2010; Timeline of Colombian history

The following lists events that happened during 2010 in Colombia.

== Incumbents ==
- President: Álvaro Uribe Vélez (until August 7), Juan Manuel Santos (starting August 7)
- Vice President: Francisco Santos Calderón (until August 7), Angelino Garzón (starting August 7)

== Events ==
=== January ===
- January 1 - At least 18 FARC rebels are killed while celebrating the New Year in an air raid by the Colombian Air Force in the south of the country.
- January 3 - The volcano Galeras erupts, forcing the evacuation of 8,000 people.
- January 5 - David Murcia Guzman is extradited to the United States to face charges of conspiracy and money laundering in the case of marketing company D.M.G. Group.
- January 9 - Reinado Internacional del Café 2010 is held in Manizales.
- January 28 - Colombia makes a formal diplomatic protest to Venezuela over the latter's alleged violation of Colombian airspace by a military helicopter.
- January 29 - The American newspaper El Nuevo Herald reports on the discovery of a mass grave behind a local cemetery in the town of La Macarena, Meta. The grave is reported to contain close to 2,000 unidentified bodies, killed and buried there by the Colombian military as guerillas over the span of 5 years according to locals and officials.

=== February ===
- 24 February - The first athlete to represent Colombia at the Winter Olympics, Cynthia Denzler, competes in her first event: the women's giant slalom alpine skiing competition.
- 26 February - The Constitutional Court of Colombia rejects a referendum proposal which, if passed, would have allowed sitting president Alvaro Uribe to run for a third term in office in a 7-2 vote.

=== March ===
- March 1–4 - Transit company owners go on strike in Bogotá, demanding inclusion in the planned Integrated Public Transport System (SITP).
- March 14 - Parliamentary elections are held for members of both chambers of Congress.
- March 15 - Jhonny Hurtado, a farmer and the President of the Human Rights Committee in La Catalina, is shot dead in La Catalina, Meta.
- March 19–30 - The IX South American Games is held in Medellín.

=== April ===
- April 22 - Television personality and model Lina Marulanda dies after falling from her apartment's 6th story balcony in Bogota. Her death is ruled a suicide.

=== May ===
- May 30 - The first round of voting in the 2010 Presidential Election takes place; no candidate receives a majority, triggering a second round.

=== June ===
- June 7 - Artist Omar Rayo dies on an ambulance ride to a hospital in Cali after a heart attack.
- June 20 - The second round of the 2010 Presidential election is held; Juan Manuel Santos wins with 69% of the vote.
- June 25 - A series of secret recordings emerge of conversations between former congressperson Germán Olano and construction company owner Miguel Nule Velilla, whose Nule Group had managed numerous public projects in Bogotá. The recordings detail multi-million dollar public commission negotiations. These recordings spark a scandal dubbed the 'Carrusel de la Contratación' (Eng. Hiring Carousel) and will lead to numerous investigations into Bogotan public officials and businessmen.

=== July ===
- July 15 - Colombian Defense Minister Gabriel Silva holds a meeting with press claiming that Venezuela is harboring high-ranking FARC and ELN leaders, this triggers the 2010 Colombia–Venezuela diplomatic crisis.

=== August ===
- August 1 - The 60th Vuelta a Colombia, an annual road cycling race, begins.
- August 4 - Resolution 1501 declares Uramba Bahía Málaga National Natural Park in Valle de Cauca to be a protected area.
- August 7 - Juan Manuel Santos is inaugurated as the 32nd President of Colombia.
- August 12 - A car bomb explodes outside the headquarters of Caracol Radio in Bogotá; Nine people are injured and FARC is blamed for the attack.
- August 16- AIRES Flight 8250 crashes on the Caribbean island of San Andrés, Colombia while trying to land at Gustavo Rojas Pinilla International Airport, killing 2 and injuring 107 of the 131 people on board. It was flying from Bogotá's El Dorado International Airport.

=== September ===
- September 22 - FARC-EP Easter Bloc commander Victor Julio Suárez (a.k.a. Jojoy Monkey) is killed by Colombian authorities during 'Operación Sodoma' in La Macarena, Meta.

=== October ===
- October 21 - The 1st Macondo Awards are held at the Jorge Eliécer Gaitán Theater in Bogotá.
- October 31 - Luis Andres Colmenares dies after attending a Halloween party at the Zona Rosa nightclub in Bogotá. His death will be the focus of multiple investigations, trials, and controversies in the following years.

=== November ===
- November 15 - Miss Colombia 2010 is held in Cartagena.

=== December ===
- December 15 - Sinú River in northwestern Colombia begins to flood as a result of heavy rains, it affects multiple localities within the Córdoba Department, including the city of Montería.
- December 24 - Pedro Oliveiro Guerrero Castillo, drug lord and leader of the right-wing ERPAC militia, dies in Mapiripán, Meta, after police operations to capture him led to a raid on his hideout.

== Deaths ==
- 26 January – Etelvina Maldonado, bullerengue singer and songwriter (b. 1932)
- 29 January – Jaime R. Echavarría, musician, Governor of Antioquia (b. 1923)
- 8 June – Armando Zabaleta, musician and songwriter (b. 1927)
