= Alberto Costa =

Alberto Costa may refer to:

- Alberto Costa (British politician) (born 1971), British politician
- Alberto Costa (Portuguese politician) (born 1947), Portuguese politician
- Alberto Zalamea Costa (1929–2011), Colombian diplomat
- Alberto Costa (footballer, born 2003), Portuguese footballer

== See also ==
- Albert Costa (born 1975), Spanish tennis player
- Albert Costa (racing driver) (born 1990), Spanish racing driver
- Costa Pereira (Alberto da Costa Pereira, 1929–1990), Portuguese footballer
- Tino Costa (Alberto Facundo Costa, born 1985), Argentine footballer
- Rui Costa (cyclist) (Rui Alberto Faria da Costa, born 1986), Portuguese road bicycle racer
