= Programar Televisión =

Programar Televisión is Colombian programadora set up in 1983 by Juan Guillermo Ríos, the family of former President Alfonso López Michelsen headed by Felipe López Caballero, Inversiones Restrepo and the Castaño Valencia family (Gloria Valencia de Castaño, Pilar Castaño and Rodrigo Castaño). This programadora is remembered for producing the Noticiero de las 7 newscast.

In 2002 allied with NTC Television to realize the Noticias Uno newscast. Programar was one of the surviving programadoras to the crisis of the programadoras. In the 2003 bidding cycle was grouped in a consortium with RTI. Programar Televisión didn't file for the extension of 2014 due to internal conflicts with R.T.I.

Programar Televisión opposed to the 2017 bidding cycle and because of that filed a criminal complaint against Minister of Information Technologies and Communications David Luna and requested precautionary measures before the Superintendency of Industry and Commerce in order to stop the bidding, arguing that it was not true that the company renounced the TV spaces it had until 2013. The ANTV defended itself by arguing that the adjudication at the time was made to a temporary union between Programar and RTI and that applied for the 40 months extension that was given to the licensees in 2013, though RTI and Programar didn't agree.
