= 2003 Neiva bombing =

Terrorist incident in Colombia

- Part of Colombian conflict
- 2003 Neiva bombing (Colombia)
- Location: Neiva, Huila, Colombia
- Date: 14 February 2003
- Weapon: Bomb
- Deaths: 13
- Injuries: 66
- Perpetrator: FARC

The 2003 Neiva bombing was a major bomb attack carried out by Revolutionary Armed Forces of Colombia (FARC) rebels in the city of Neiva, Colombia on February 14, 2003. Sixteen people died and a dozen others were injured after the explosion of a car bomb near Benito Salas Airport. Police claimed FARC tried to blow up a plane carrying President Álvaro Uribe who was flying overhead. Nine police officers were among those who died. The explosive charge of the blast was 330-440 pounds.

Police discovered the plot and raided the house. Because of this the terrorists decided to detonate the bomb at that moment instead, thus missing the President in the plane. The powerful blast managed to destroy five nearby houses and damaged 30 more.

On the same day, two CIA operatives were captured by the guerillas in Colombia, whilst two others were thought to have been assassinated.

== See also ==
- 2003 El Nogal Club bombing
- 2003 Zona Rosa attacks
