= 2005 in Colombia =

- Decades: 1980s; 1990s; 2000s; 2010s; 2020s
- See also: Other events of 2005; Timeline of Colombian history

Events from the year 2005 in Colombia.

== Incumbents ==
- President: Álvaro Uribe Vélez (2002 – 2010).
- Vice President: Francisco Santos Calderón (2002 – 2010).

== Events ==
=== January ===
- 26 January – Catalina Sandino Moreno becomes the first Colombian to be nominated for Best Actress at the Oscars for her role in Maria Full of Grace as María Álvarez.

=== February ===
- 21–22 February – San José de Apartadó massacre: Members of the Military of Colombia and United Self-Defense Forces of Colombia (AUC) kill five adults and three children in the village of San José de Apartadó.

=== March ===
- 25 March – West Caribbean Airways Flight 9955: A flight between the Providencia and San Andres Islands crashes after its left engine flames out. The two pilots and seven of the passengers are killed.

=== April ===
- 8 April – Solar eclipse of April 8, 2005: An annular version of a total solar eclipse is visible in areas of Colombia.

=== May ===
- 12 May – Ex-Justice Minister Alberto Santofimio Botero is arrested for the 1989 assassination of Luis Carlos Galán.
- 22 May – Jamundí massacre: The Colombian National Army's High Mountain Battalion kill 10 policemen of the Colombian National Police and a civilian in Jamundí, Valle del Cauca.

=== June ===
- 25 June – The 48th Front of the Revolutionary Armed Forces of Colombia- People's Army (FARC-EP) fight with National Army Military troops at Teteyé military base; 19 soldiers die, 11 are injured, and one is kidnapped.

=== July ===
- 24 July – The 55th Vuelta a Colombia begins in Pitalito, Huila.

=== August ===
- 12–21 August – The 15th Bolivarian Games is held in Armenia, Pereira, Cartagena, and Bogotá, officially opened on the 12th by President Uribe.
- 24 August – Vallenato singer Kaleth Morales is killed in a traffic accident at 21 years old.

=== September ===
- 13 September – Ex-president Julio César Turbay Ayala dies.

=== October ===
- 19 October –The Constitutional Court approves reform that would allow president Uribe to run for a second presidential term in 2006.

=== November ===
- 14 November – Miss Colombia 2005 is held in Cartagena de Indias; Miss Atlántico Valerie Dominguez wins.
- 25 November – The Green Alliance Party of Colombia is founded as the Center Option Party (Spanish: Partido Opción Centro).

=== December ===
- The Independent Democratic Pole (PDI) and the Democratic Alternative (AD) merge to form the Alternative Democratic Pole (PDA).
- 3 December – Ex-senator Jaime Lozada Perdomo is assassinated by the FARC-EP.

== Births ==
- 22 February – Linda Caicedo, professional soccer player.

== Deaths ==
- 18 July – Antonio María Peñaloza, musician, arranger, and songwriter (b. 1916)
- 24 August – Kaleth Morales, vallenato singer (b. 1984).
- 13 September – Julio César Turbay Ayala, president of Colombia from 1978 to 1982 (b. 1916).
- 3 December – Jaime Lozada Perdomo, former senator (b. 1949).
