= 2008 in Colombia =

- Decades: 1980s; 1990s; 2000s; 2010s; 2020s
- See also: Other events of 2008; Timeline of Colombian history

The following lists events that happened during 2008 in Colombia.

== Incumbents ==
- President: Álvaro Uribe Vélez
- Vice President: Francisco Santos Calderón

== Events ==
=== January ===
- January 10 - FARC guerrillas release Colombian hostages Clara Rojas and Consuelo González.

=== February ===
- February 27 - Venezuelan president Hugo Chávez negotiates a deal leading to the release of four hostages held by Colombian FARC rebels. The hostages were members of Congress and had been held since 2001 and 2002.

=== March ===
- March 2 - President of Venezuela Hugo Chávez orders the closure of the Venezuelan embassy in Colombia and moves ten battalions to the Colombian border in response to the killing of FARC leader Raúl Reyes in Ecuador by Colombian armed forces the previous day. Rafael Correa, the President of Ecuador, orders troops to the Colombian border. The Colombian government accuses Correa of having "a relationship and commitments" with FARC.
- March 14 - Colombian Ministry of National Defense Juan Manuel Santos says the government will pay US$2.5 million to Pedro Pablo Montoya, the FARC rebel who killed Iván Ríos.

=== April ===
- April 6 - Mark Penn resigns as chief strategist for the Hillary Clinton 2008 presidential campaign. This comes in the wake of revelations that he performed lobbying work for the Colombian government, regarding a free trade pact that Senator Clinton opposes.
- April 14 - The Nevado del Huila volcano erupts in Colombia, causing thousands to evacuate.

=== May ===
- May 13 - Colombia extradites 14 former paramilitary leaders, including Salvatore Mancuso, Rodrigo Tovar Pupo, and Diego Murillo Bejarano, to the United States where they have been charged with drug trafficking
- May 15 - Interpol confirms that Colombia did not tamper with computer files in hardware seized from Raul Reyes. This alleged that Venezuela and Ecuador provided funding, assistance and drug routes to the terrorist group Revolutionary Armed Forces of Colombia. However, Interpol stated that they had not looked at the content of the files, only their authenticity.
- May 18 - A senior Revolutionary Armed Forces of Colombia commander known as "Karina" surrenders to Colombian authorities.
- May 24 - A 5.9 earthquake with its epicentre in the Department of Meta strikes the Central and West areas of Colombia; at least 11 people are killed with over 4000 injuries reported.

=== June ===
- June 24 - Representing Pope Benedict XVI, Colombian Cardinal Darío Castrillón Hoyos makes a reconciliation offer to the conservative Society of St. Pius X. Hoyos requested the Society respect the Pope's authority, and expected a positive response by the end of the month.

=== July ===
- July 2 - Íngrid Betancourt, held captive by the FARC guerilla for six years, is rescued in an operation by the Colombian government.
- July 20 - The Colombian diaspora celebrates Colombia's Independence Day with concerts and marches against violence, kidnapping and the FARC in Bogotá, Leticia, the country's other 1,119 cities and municipalities, and events in cities around the world including Paris (attended by Ingrid Betancourt), London, Washington, D.C., New York City and Miami.

=== October ===
- October 26 - Óscar Tulio Lizcano, a Conservative congressman kidnapped by the FARC in August 2000, is freed by the military in Chocó Department.

=== November ===
- November 22 - The government of Colombia confirms that the eruption of Nevado del Huila, a volcano in southern Colombia, has led to at least ten deaths in recent days and the evacuation of 12,000 people.

== Deaths ==
- 9 March – Pello Torres, trumpeter and songwriter (b. 1924)
- 7 September – Berenice Chávez, singer (b. 1926)
