= 2007 in Colombia =

- Decades: 1980s; 1990s; 2000s; 2010s; 2020s
- See also: Other events of 2007; Timeline of Colombian history

The following lists events that happened during 2007 in Colombia.

== Incumbents ==
- President: Álvaro Uribe Vélez
- Vice President: Francisco Santos Calderón

== Events ==
=== January ===
- 15 January – Colombian police arrest Eugenio Montoya, also known as Don Hugo, suspected of being a leader of the Norte del Valle syndicate, which is described by the Federal Bureau of Investigation as the “most powerful and violent drug-trafficking organization in Colombia”.

=== February ===
- 15 February – Six Colombian legislators are arrested due to alleged links to paramilitary groups, including Senator Álvaro Araújo, the brother of Foreign Minister María Consuelo Araújo.
- 19 February – Colombian foreign minister María Consuelo Araújo resigns days after the arrest of her brother, Senator Álvaro Araújo, in the country's ongoing para-political scandal. President Álvaro Uribe Vélez appoints Fernando Araújo as the new Minister.

=== March ===
- 23 March – Jorge Noguera, former Colombian intelligence chief, is freed from prison following a ruling by an appeals court after having been jailed last month for collaborating with right wing militia.

=== April ===
- 26 April – A nationwide mid-morning power outage hits Colombia; government sources discount guerrilla activity and blame a technical fault.

=== May ===
- 9 May – At least nine Colombian policemen are killed, and six others injured, from a bomb planted by the Revolutionary Armed Forces of Colombia in Santander Department.
- 14 May – Jorge Daniel Castro, the head of the Colombian National Police force and Guillermo Chavez, the intelligence chief, resign over an illegal wiretapping scandal.

=== July ===
- 10 July – Simón Trinidad, a high-ranking member of the Revolutionary Armed Forces of Colombia, is found guilty of conspiracy to hold three Americans hostage by a U.S. court.
- 28 July 28 – Colombia's intelligence chief Andrés Peñate claims FARC rebels accidentally killed 11 politicians it was holding, after running into another rebel unit.
- 30 July 30 – Juan Manuel Santos, the Defense Minister of Colombia, claims that the military has been infiltrated by FARC and drug gangs.

=== August ===
- 7 August – Juan Carlos Ramirez-Abadia, Colombian cocaine trafficker boss of the Norte del Valle Cartel is apprehended in Brazil and faces extradition to the United States. The US Government had offered a reward of US$5 million.

=== September ===
- 10 September – Diego León Montoya Sánchez, leader of the Norte del Valle cartel and one of the FBI Ten Most Wanted Fugitives, is captured by Colombian authorities.

=== October ===
- 13 October – At least 20 people die following a landslide at an open pit gold mine near Suarez in the Tolima department.

== Deaths ==
- April – Pedro García Díaz, 68–69, singer, songwriter, accordionist, and lawyer
- 2 June – Leonor Buenaventura de Valencia, 93, songwriter and poet
- 21 June – Elberto López, 56, accordionist
- 18 October – Peregoyo, 90, musician and songwriter
