= 2012 in Colombia =

- Decades: 1990s; 2000s; 2010s; 2020s
- See also: Other events of 2012; Timeline of Colombian history

The following lists events that happened during 2012 in Colombia.

== Incumbents ==
- President: Juan Manuel Santos
- Vice President: Angelino Garzón

== Events ==
=== January ===
- January 9 - FARC Commander in Chief Rodrigo Londoño Echeverry calls on the Colombian government to restart the Caguán peace accord agenda that ended in 2002 in a letter to President Juan Manuel Santos.

=== February ===
- February 26 - The Revolutionary Armed Forces of Colombia or FARC announces that it has abandoned kidnapping and will soon release its last remaining captives.

=== March ===
- March 26 - Colombian forces kill 32 FARC rebels in the latest government offensive.

=== April ===
- April 2 - FARC releases its last remaining police and military captives.
- April 5 - Russian businessman Victor Bout is sentenced to 25 years in prison for smuggling weapons to FARC.
- April 14/15 - The 6th Summit of the Americas is held in Cartagena
- April 15 - The U.S. Secret Service announces it has put 11 agents on leave while it investigates alleged "inappropriate conduct" in Cartagena before the 6th Summit of the Americas there attended by U.S. President Barack Obama. It emerges that five soldiers are also facing investigation.
- April 16 - The U.S. military's top officer Martin Dempsey speaks of being "embarrassed" and tells a Pentagon news conference "we let the boss down" in relation to allegations that United States Secret Service agents habitually associated with prostitutes in Colombia. Pentagon spokesman George E. Little tells reporters that the number of military staff involved could be more than the five originally reported.
- April 19 - An agent at the center of the U.S. prostitution scandal in Colombia denied one of his escorts $770 from an agreed fee of $800, according to The New York Times, thus prompting the row that revealed the scandal to the public.
- April 21 - The U.S. Secret Service dismisses three more employees over the prostitution scandal involving U.S. agents at last weekend's 6th Summit of the Americas in Colombia.
- April 21 - The Patriotic March (Marcha Patriótica) Political Party, member of the São Paulo Forum (FSP), is founded.
- April 23 - White House lawyers launch an internal investigation into the role its advance staff may have played in the U.S. Secret Service sex scandal in Colombia, though no evidence has been found to implicate anyone in the scandal.
- April 27 - The Revolutionary Armed Forces of Colombia (FARC) kills eight people in two separate attacks.
- April 29 - The Revolutionary Armed Forces of Colombia (FARC) kills four members of Colombian Army on a mission to destroy cocaine laboratories in Caquetá Department with another four soldiers, a police officer and a French journalist missing.

=== May ===
- May 15 - Fernando Londoño, former Minister of the Interior and Justice, is targeted in a car bombing in Bogotá. The blast kills his driver and injures 20 bystanders in addition to Londoño himself.

=== June ===
- June 12-24 - The 62nd Vuelta a Colombia is held.
- June 26 - Telecommunication companies Comcel and Telmex Colombia merge to form Claro Colombia.

=== July ===
- July 28 - 2012 Summer Olympics: Rigoberto Urán finishes second in the men's road race final, winning a silver medal for Colombia.

=== August ===
- August 26 - A General Agreement for the Termination of the Conflict and the Construction of a Stable and Lasting Peace is signed by representatives for the Colombian government and FARC in Havana, Cuba as a part of the Colombian peace process.

=== September ===
- September 3 - Infamous drug trafficker Griselda Blanco is shot and killed walking out of a butcher's shop in Medellin at the age of 69.
- September 17 - The Sabaneta and the La Estrella stations of line A of the Medellín Metro opens.
- September 30 - The Integrated Public Transport System (SITP) begins operation in Bogotá.
- September 30 - The 7.2 La Vega Earthquake occurs in La Vega, Cauca at a depth of 170 km in the subducting Nazca Plate.

=== October ===
- October 1 - The first season of La Voz Colombia, Colombia's version of The Voice, premieres on Caracol TV.

=== November ===
- November 12 - The 60th Miss Colombia is held in Cartagena.
- November 20- The Revolutionary Armed Forces of Colombia (FARC) announces a unilateral temporary ceasefire with the Colombian Government until January 20, 2013.

=== December ===
- December 11 - The Senate approves a constitutional amendment, modifying Articles 116, 152, and 221 to expand the military's jurisdiction over criminal acts.
- December 28 - The constitutional amendment approved by the senate on December 11 is put into effect as Legislative Act No. 2 on Military Jurisdiction.

== Deaths ==
- 13 November – Cecilia Meza Reales, accordionist and singer (b. 1946)
