= 2006 in Colombia =

- Decades: 1980s; 1990s; 2000s; 2010s; 2020s
- See also: Other events of 2006; Timeline of Colombian history

Events from the year 2006 in Colombia.

== Incumbents ==
- President: Álvaro Uribe Vélez (2002 – 2010).
- Vice President: Francisco Santos Calderón (2002 – 2010).

== Events ==
=== January ===
- 8 January – Football player Elson Becerra is shot dead at a nightclub in Cartagena.
- 10 January – The 2006 Reinado Internacional del Café is held in Manizales, Colombia.

=== February ===
- 14 February – Esneda Ruiz Cataño kills her husband José Valencia Guzmán for life insurance in Aranjuez, stabbing him in the neck beside a pool. He was her second known victim.
- 27 February – United States Trade Representative Rob Portman and Colombian Minister of Commerce, Industry, and Tourism Jorge Humberto Botero announce the conclusion of the bilateral United States–Colombia Free Trade Agreement.

=== March ===
- 12 March – The 2006 Colombian parliamentary election and Presidential Primaries are held, electing Senators and Chamber Representatives and selecting Liberal Party and Alternative Democratic Pole presidential candidates.

=== April ===
- 27 April – Liliana Gaviria Trujillo, sister of ex-president César Gaviria, is kidnapped and murdered by the Columna Móvil Teófilo Forero of the FARC-EP in Dosquebradas, Risaralda.

=== May ===
- 28 May – The 2006 Colombian presidential election is held. President Uribe is re-elected with 62.35% of the vote, defeating Carlos Gaviria Díaz and Horacio Serpa.

=== June ===
- 25 June – Deportivo Pasto becomes a champion in 2006 Categoría Primera A semifinals for the first time in its history after defeating Deportivo Cali in the finals with a collective score of 2–1.

=== July ===
- 15–30 July – The 20th Central American and Caribbean Games are held in Cartagena de Indias, with some events also in Bogotá and Barranquilla.
- 29 July – Lissette Ochoa domestic violence case: Lissette Ochoa and her husband Rafael Dangond attend a wedding in Barranquilla. Dangond becomes jealous and beats Ochoa for hours, eventually shooting at, and missing, her when she escaped. This becomes an infamous example of domestic violence against women in Colombia after photos of Ochoa before and after the wedding went viral.

=== August ===
- 7 August – The Second inauguration of Álvaro Uribe is held in Bogotá, President Uribe is the 4th Colombian president to be re-elected.

=== September ===
- 21 September – Vladimiro Montesinos, former Peruvian intelligence chief, is convicted and sentenced to 20 years for smuggling guns to the FARC.

=== October ===
- 18 October – President Uribe orders for the newly created Black Eagles paramilitary to be shut down and detained.

=== November ===
- 12 November – Miss Colombia 2006 is held in Cartagena de Indias.
- 22 November – The United States–Colombia Free Trade Agreement is signed.

=== December ===
- 1 December – Lissette Ochoa domestic violence case: Rafael Dangond publicly acknowledges his drug addiction and mental health issues and their effects on his wife and children, apologizing for what he did earlier in the year.

== Births ==
- Karla Torres, footballer.

== Deaths ==
- 8 January – Elson Becerra, footballer (b. 1978).
- 5 February – José María Peñaranda, musician and songwriter (b. 1907)
- 18 February – Arturo Abella Rodríguez, journalist, writer, and historian (b. 1915).
- 21 February – Hernán Echavarría Olózaga, economist and industrialist (b. 1911).
- 10 May – Soraya (37), songwriter (b. 1969).
- 10 June – Abel Antonio Villa, singer and composer (b. 1924).
