= 2009 in Colombia =

- Decades: 1980s; 1990s; 2000s; 2010s; 2020s
- See also: Other events of 2009; Timeline of Colombian history

Events in the year 2009 in Colombia.

== Incumbents ==
- President: Álvaro Uribe

== Events ==
=== February ===
- February - FARC frees a former provincial governor along with five other high-profile hostages since 2001.

=== March ===
- 18 March - FARC releases a Swedish engineer thought to be the rebel group's last foreign hostage.

=== November ===
- November - President Alvaro Uribe signs a deal giving the US military access to seven military bases.

=== December ===
- December - Marxist rebel groups intend to stop fighting each other and focus on attacking the Colombian armed forces.
- December - Venezuelan President Hugo Chavez orders 15,000 troops to the Colombian border.

== Deaths ==
- 10 January - Liliana Lozano, 30, Colombian actress and beauty queen, shot.
- 16 March - Ramón Mantilla Duarte, 83, Colombian Bishop of Ipiales (1985–1987).
- 13 May - Rafael Escalona, 81, Colombian Vallenato composer and troubador.
- 30 May - Alexander Obregón, 32, Colombian footballer, car accident.
- 5 June - Helena Benítez de Zapata, 93, songwriter, politician, teacher, and journalist.
- 18 July - Ricardo Londoño, 59, Colombian racing driver, shot.
- 29 August - Gustavo Martínez Frías, 74, Colombian archbishop of Nueva Pamplona.
- 11 September - Julio Bovea, 75, musician.
- 20 September - Herman Córdoba, 19, Colombian footballer, traffic collision.
- 1 November - Arturo Salazar Mejía, 88, Colombian Roman Catholic Bishop of Pasto.
- 6 November - Abraham Escudero Montoya, 69, Colombian Roman Catholic Bishop of Palmira.
- 21 December - Jaime Agudelo, 84, Colombian comedian, respiratory failure.
- 22 December - Luis Francisco Cuéllar, 69, Colombian politician, Governor of Caqueta, assassination.
