= Neiva National Telegraph and Post Office Building =

Colombian building/landmark

National Telegraph and Post Office Building
- Edificio Nacional de Correos y Telégrafos
- Location within Colombia

General information
- Architectural style: Neo-Mudéjar
- Location: Neiva, Colombia, Colombia
- Coordinates: 2°59′55″N 75°18′16″W
- Current tenants: DIAN
- Completed: 1935
- Client: Colombian government

Height
- Height: 142 metres (466 ft)

Dimensions
- Diameter: 160 by 150 metres (520 ft × 490 ft)

Technical details
- Floor area: 260,000 square metres (2,800,000 sq ft)

Design and construction
- Architect: Alberto Wills Ferro

The National Telegraph and Post Office Building is a public building and landmark in the city of Neiva in the Huila Department. It was built in the early 1930s commissioned by Alfonso Araújo, the Colombian Minister of Public Works, during the presidencial term of Enrique Olaya Herrera.

The National Building was designed by the architect Alberto Wills Ferro influenced by Mudéjar Architecture and Art Deco. The building originally was used mainly as post office. Currently it is used by DIAN, the Colombian National Tax and Customs office.
