= 2004 in Colombia =

- Decades: 1980s; 1990s; 2000s; 2010s; 2020s
- See also: Other events of 2004; Timeline of Colombian history

Events from the year 2004 in Colombia.

== Incumbents ==
- President: Álvaro Uribe Vélez (2002 – 2010).
- Vice President: Francisco Santos Calderón (2002 – 2010).

== Events ==
=== January ===
- 2 January – Senior Revolutionary Armed Forces of Colombia (FARC) member Simón Trinidad is captured in Quito, Ecuador.

=== February ===
- 21 February – The 2004 Barranquilla Carnival begins.

=== March ===
- 4 March – President Uribe is in Doral, Florida, U.S.A speaking at U.S. Southern Command.

=== April ===
- 16 April – Carlos Castaño Gil, co-founder of the Peasant Self-Defenders of Córdoba and Urabá (ACCU) and leader in the United Self Defense Forces of Colombia (AUC), is killed under uncertain circumstances.

=== May ===
- 5 May – Senior FARC member Simón Trinidad is sentenced to 35 years in prison for kidnapping and rebellion in Valledupar.

=== June ===
- 6 June – The Colombia national football team plays Uruguay's in Barranquilla in a FIFA World Cup CONMEBOL qualification game. Colombia wins 5–0.

=== July ===
- The AUC and Colombian Government begin peace talks; AUC leaders address Congress.

=== August ===
- 5 August – U.S. Secretary of Defense Donald Rumsfeld receives a memo about recent reporting from the New York Times, Newsweek, and the Los Angeles Times on a declassified 1991 memo linking President Uribe to paramilitaries, drug trafficking, and Pablo Escobar.
- 5 August – Colombian soldiers assassinate union leaders Jorge Eduardo Prieto, Leonel Goyeneche, and Hector Alirio Martinez in Saravena, Arauca. The army initially claims that the victims were Marxist rebels killed in a battle.

=== September ===
- 6 September – The Attorney General's Office of Colombia admits that Colombian soldiers assassinated three union leaders on August 5 in Saravena. It orders the arrest of two soldiers, a civilian, and an army officer for the deaths of Jorge Eduardo Prieto, Leonel Goyeneche, and Hector Alirio Martinez.

=== November ===
- 12 November – Miss Colombia 2004 is held in Cartagena de Indias. Miss Atlántico Adriana Tarud is crowned the winner.
- 15 November – At 4:06 local time (9:06 UTC), a magnitude 7.2 earthquake hits near Bajo Baudó, Chocó. There are no reported fatalities.

=== December ===
- 13 December – Rodrigo Granda affair: Foreign Minister of the FARC Rodrigo Granda is captured by Venezuelan Officials in Caracas, Venezuela and transferred to Cúcuta, Colombia.

== Deaths ==
- 2 January – Hernando Caro Mendoza, music critic, journalist, and teacher (b. 1927).
- 11 February – Albeiro Usuriaga, footballer (b. 1966).
- 15 March – Amparo Arrebato, dancer (b. 1944).
- 1 April – Enrique Grau, painter and sculptor (b. 1920).
- 16 April – Carlos Castaño Gil, AUC leader (b. 1965).
- 26 April – Hernando Valencia Goelkel, critic and essayist (b. 1928).
- 27 April – María Teresa Benavídez Díaz, catholic nun (b. 1956).
- 19 May – Manuel J. Bernal, pianist, organist, composer, arranger, and orchestra director (b. 1924).
- 4 June – Tirso Vélez, poet, teacher, and politician (b. 1954).
- 27 July – Carlos Gustavo Arrieta Alandete, politician and lawyer (b. 1914).
