= Fernando Ospina Hernández =

Colombian engineer and politician (1929–2021)

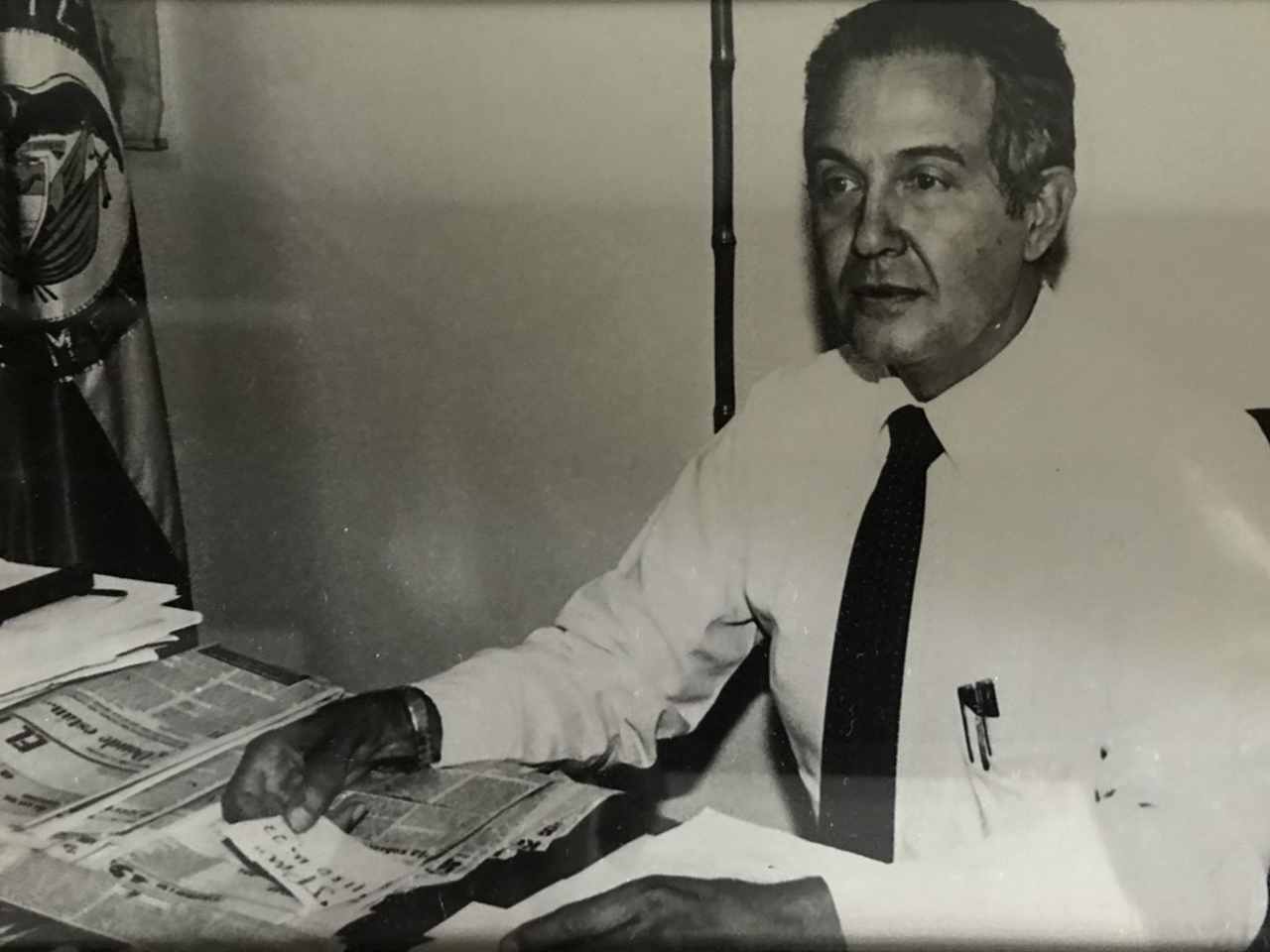

Member of the Chamber of Representatives
- In office 20 July 1982 – 20 July 1986
- Constituency: Antioquia; Chocó

Personal details
- Born: 29 March 1929 Medellín, Antioquia, Colombia
- Died: 15 December 2021 (aged 92) Bogotá, D.C., Colombia
- Party: Conservative
- Spouse: Olga Duque de Ospina (m. 1954; died 2019)

Fernando Ospina Hernández (29 March 1929 – 15 December 2021) was a Colombian engineer and politician. A member of the Colombian Conservative Party, he served in the Chamber of Representatives of Colombia from 1982 to 1986. He died on 15 December 2021, at the age of 92.
