= Olga Duque de Ospina =

Colombian politician (1930–2019)

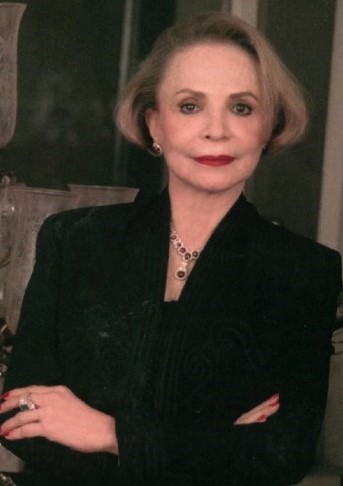

Minister of National Education
- In office July 10, 1996 – July 7, 1997
- President: Ernesto Samper
- Preceded by: María Emma Mejía
- Succeeded by: Jaime Niño

Senator of Colombia
- In office July 20, 1986 – July 20, 1990
- In office July 20, 1978 – July 20, 1982

Governor of Huila
- In office September 7, 1975 – March 5, 1975
- Preceded by: Héctor Polanía
- Succeeded by: David Rojas

Member of the Chamber of Representatives
- In office July 20, 1970 – July 20, 1975
- Constituency: Capital District

Personal details
- Born: Olga Duque Palma; July 14, 1930 Neiva, Huila, Colombia
- Died: September 16, 2019 (aged 89) Bogotá, D.C., Colombia
- Party: Conservative
- Spouse: Fernando Ospina Hernández (m. 1954)
- Children: 6
- Parents: Maximiliano Duque Gómez; María Josefa Palma
- Education: Saint Thomas Aquinas University (BBL)
- Occupation: Politician; lawyer; diplomatic
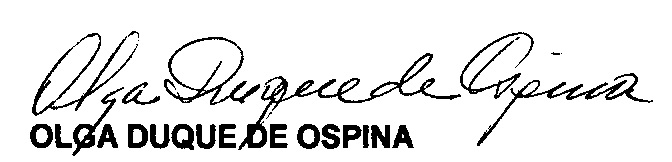
- Signature

Olga Duque de Ospina (née Duque Palma; July 14, 1930 - September 19, 2019) was a Colombian lawyer and politician, a member of the Conservative party, having served as a member of the Chamber of Representatives representing Bogotá, D.C. from 1970 to 1974. She later served as Governor of Huila and later served as Senator of Colombia from 1978 to 1982 and again from 1986 to 1990. She would finally serve as Minister of National Education, being the sixth woman in the history of Colombia to hold that position.
