= Wilson Choperena =

Colombian composer and singer

- Born: Wilson Darío Choperena Mugno; 25 December 1923; El Plato, Colombia
- Died: 1 December 2011 (aged 87)

Wilson Darío Choperena Mugno (25 December 1923 – 1 December 2011), known as Wilson Choperena, was a Colombian composer and singer. He is particularly remembered for composing the lyrics to "La Pollera Colorá" and the song "Lamento Costeño".

== Biography ==
Choperena was born on 25 December 1923 in El Plato, Magdalena. As a child he learnt popular songs from his grandmother. Choperena's first original composition was a song called "¿Por qué estás así?", which he recorded accompanied by Los Trovadores de Barú.

Choperena moved to Barrancabermeja around 1955, and there joined the orchestra of Pedro Salcedo. In 1960 Choperena suggested to clarinetist Juan Madera Castro that they put words to Madera's instrumental composition "La Pollera Colorá", which the band had been playing for several months. In 1962 Choperena and Madera registered the song together at the notary office in Barrancabermeja.

The success of "La Pollera Colorá" led Pedro Salcedo to move his orchestra to Bogotá, but Madera chose to stay in Sucre. At some point Choperena started claiming sole credit for composing the song. Madera took him to court, and in 2010 Choperena was sentenced to 5 years in prison.

Choperena died on 1 December 2011, at the age of 87, after being hospitalised due to symptoms of Parkinson's disease.
