= Neiva, Huila =

Neiva
- Municipality and city
- Municipio de Neiva
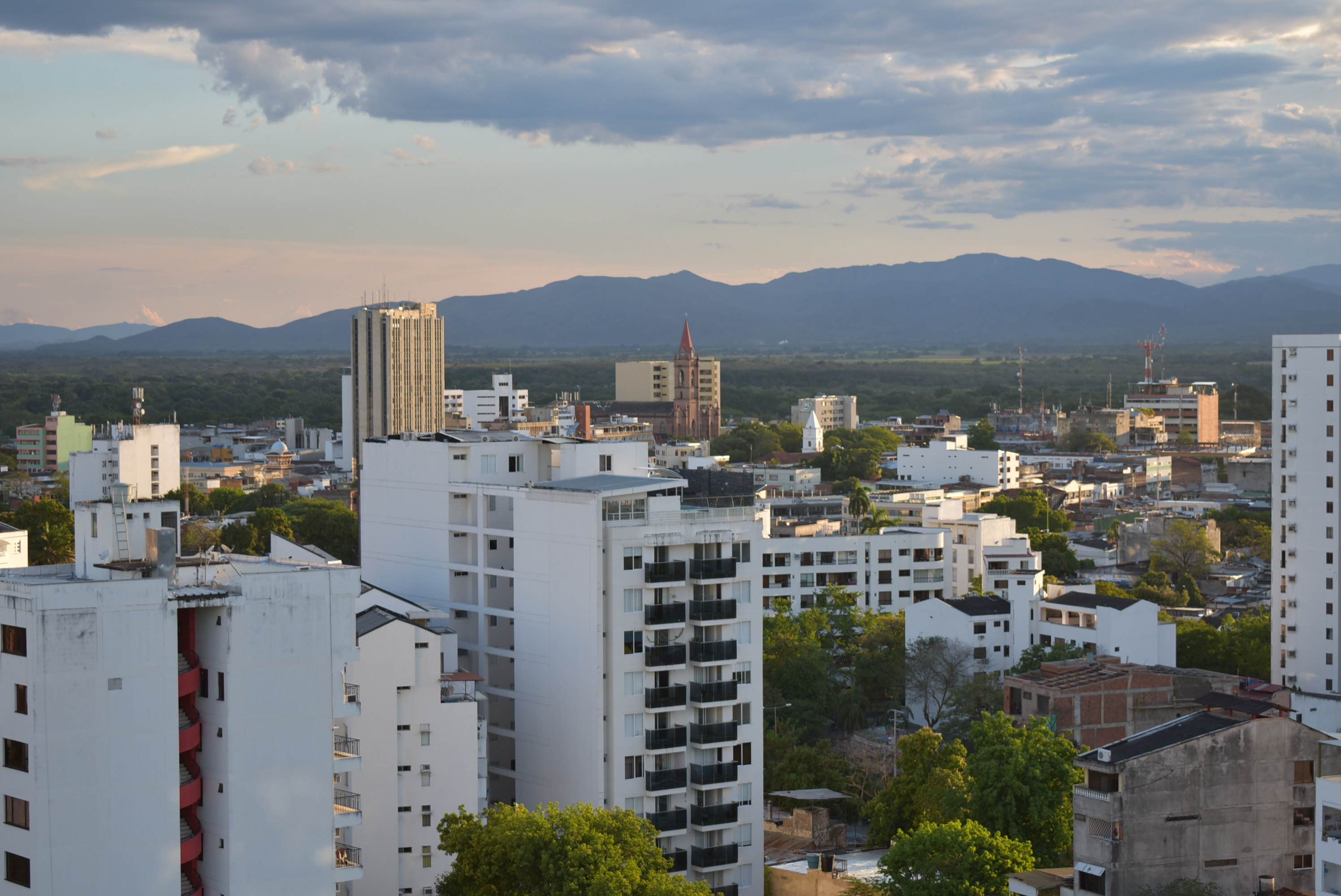
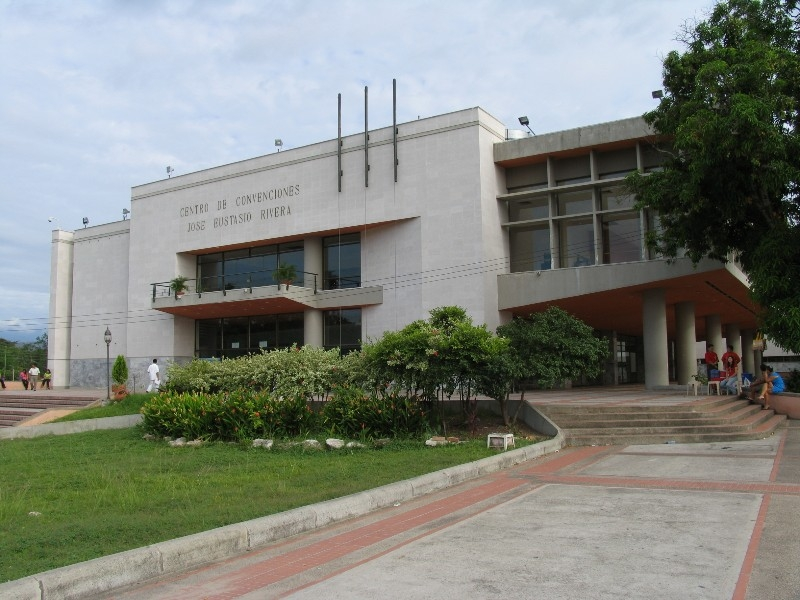
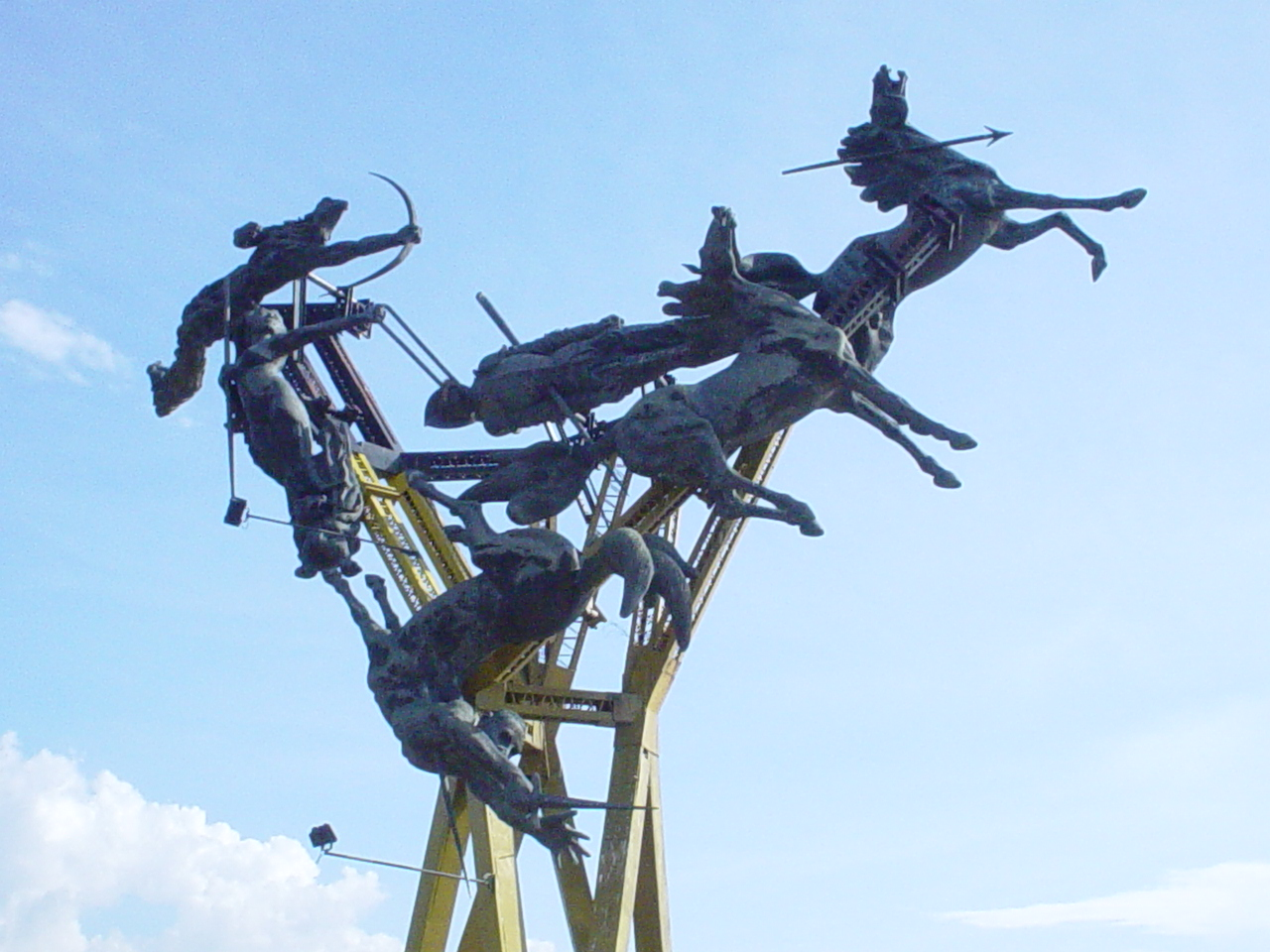
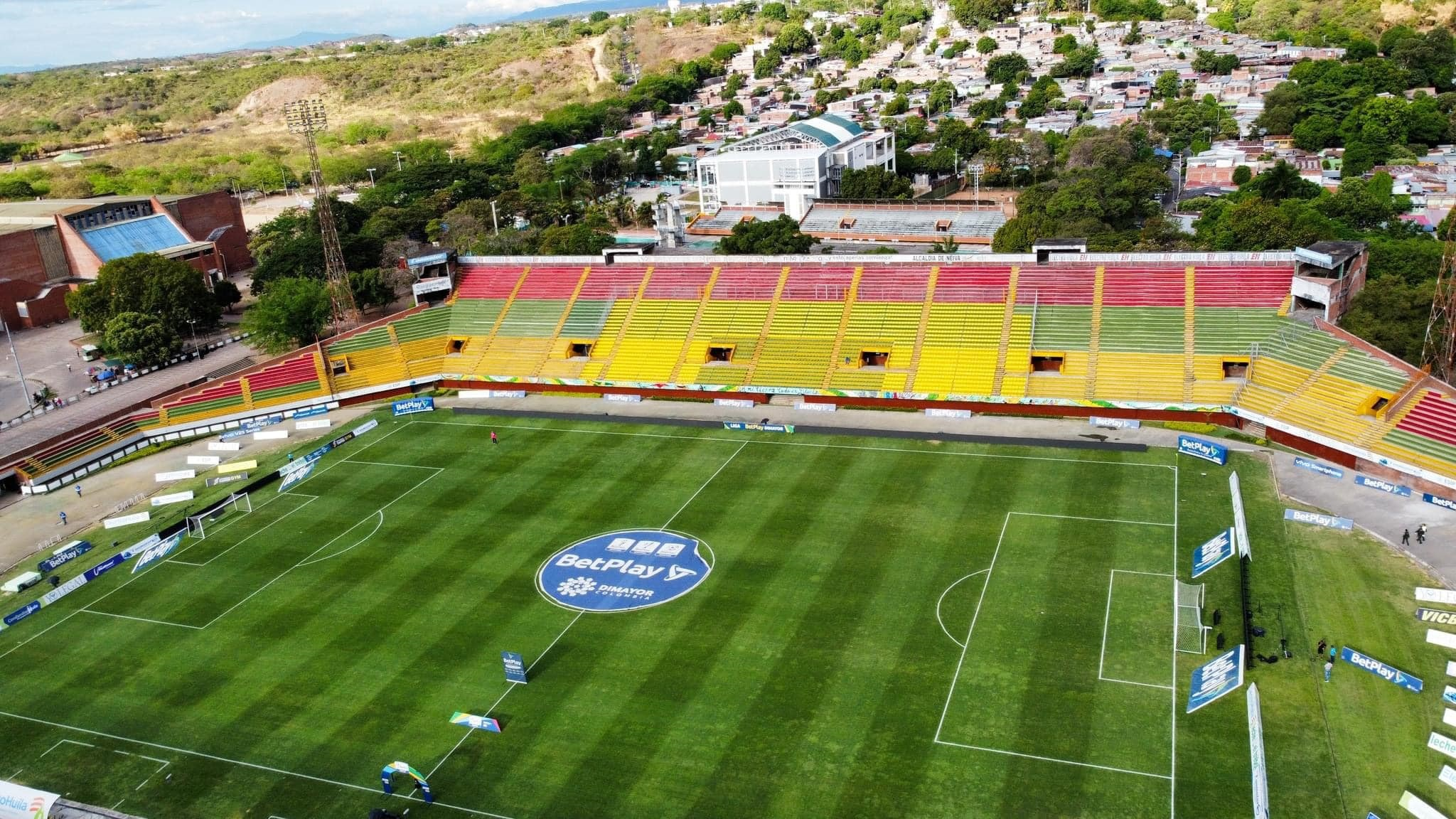
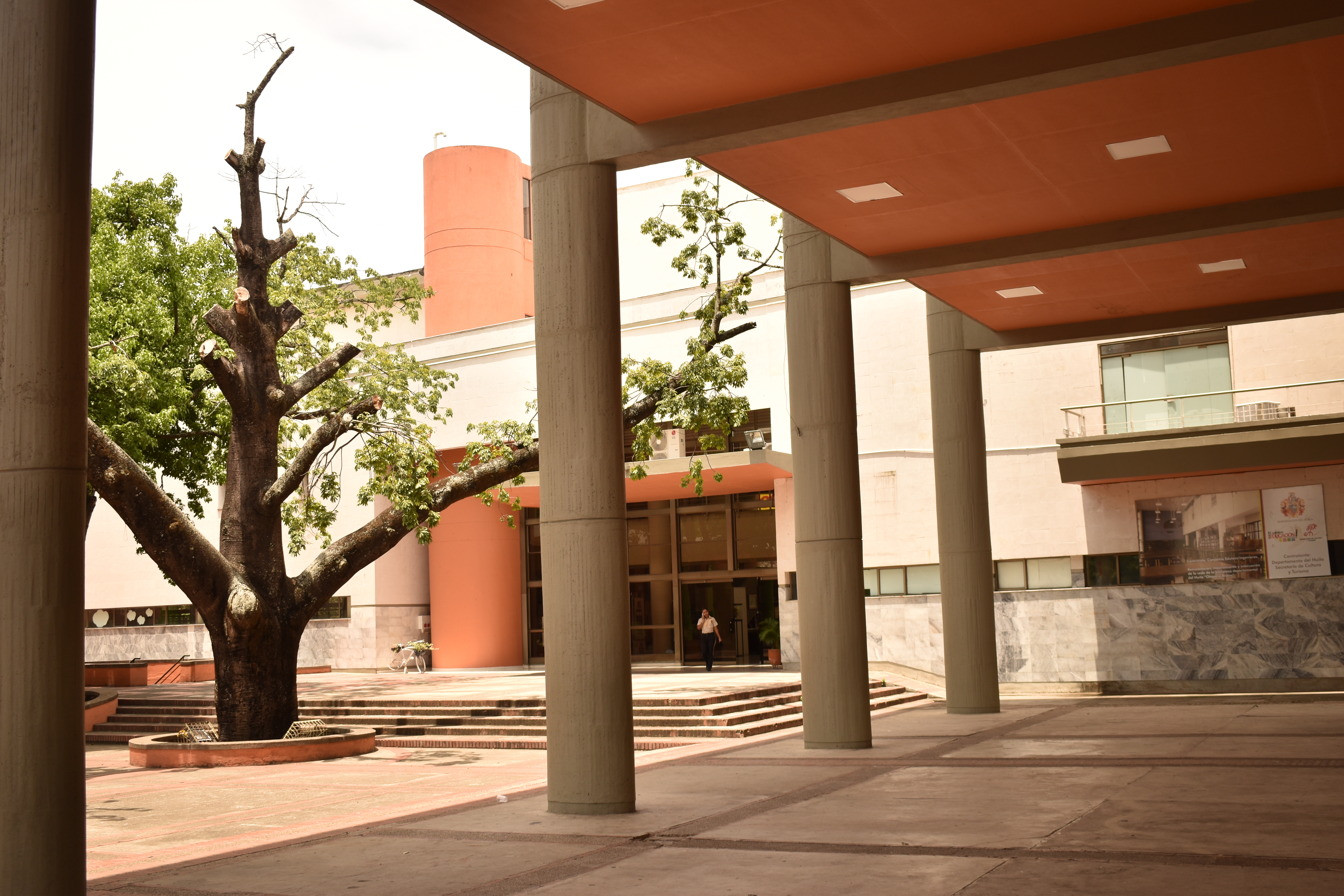
- Neiva skyline José Eustasio Rivera convention center Cacica La Gaitana monument Guillermo Plazas Alcid stadium Contemporary art of Huila museum

- Flag Coat of arms
- Nickname: La capital del río Magdalena (Magdalena River's Capital)
- Location in the Huila Department. Urban in red, municipality in dark gray

- Location in Colombia
- Coordinates: 2°56′04.14″N 75°16′51.24″W
- Country: Colombia
- Region: Andean
- Department: Huila
- Foundation: May 24, 1612

Government
  - Mayor: Germán Casagua Bonilla

Area
  - Municipality and city: 1,270 km^{2} (490 sq mi)
  - Urban: 47.29 km^{2} (18.26 sq mi)
- Elevation: 442 m (1,450 ft)

Population (2026 census)
  - Municipality and city: 392,009
  - Density: 309/km^{2} (799/sq mi)
  - Urban: 365,542
  - Urban density: 7,730/km^{2} (20,020/sq mi)
- Demonym: Neivano
- Time zone: UTC-05 (Eastern Time Zone)
- Postal code: 410001-18
- Area code: 57 + 8
- Anthem: "Hoy a Neiva Cantad Corazones"
- Website: Official website (in Spanish)

Neiva (Spanish pronunciation: [ˈnejβa]) is the capital and most populated city of the Department of Huila, south central Colombia. It is located in the valley of the Magdalena River with a municipal population of 392,009 as of 2026. It is one of the most important cities in southern Colombia, mainly because of its strategic geographical location.

== History ==
Neiva was first founded in 1539 by Juan de Cabrera in an area now belonging to the municipality of Campoalegre. In 1550, Juan de Alonso y Arias relocated the city to the place that is now the municipality of Villavieja. At this location, the city was destroyed by indigenous tribes in 1560. The city was founded, at its current location, for the third and final time in 1612 by Diego de Ospina y Medinilla.

Neiva became important during the colonial times because of its strategic location. It was located in the trade route that communicated the Viceroyalty of Peru with Bogotá and Caracas. The city was declared as the capital of the Province of Neiva, made up of the Neiva, La Plata, Timaná, Purificación cabildos. In 1905 the city became the capital of the newly created Huila Department, which had been severed from the Tolima Department by the national government.

In 1967, the city suffered an earthquake of magnitude 7.2. The earthquake destroyed several buildings including the Palacio de las 57 ventanas, the Governor's building.

In 2003 the city was the scene of a large bombing that was targeted at the Colombian President. 13 people were killed.

== Geography and climate ==
The city has the dry-summer tropical savannah climate (Köppen climate classification: As), relatively rare and scattered across the world.

Due to its location near the equator and its low altitude, the city has a hot annual average climate with daytime temperatures ranging from 88 to 95 degrees Fahrenheit. It is about 300 kilometers / 186.4 miles (about a five-hour drive) from the Colombian capital, Bogotá.

The city of Palembang in Indonesia is the antipode of Neiva.

Climate data for Neiva (Benito Salas Airport), elevation 439 m (1,440 ft), (1981–2010)
Month	Jan	Feb	Mar	Apr	May	Jun	Jul	Aug	Sep	Oct	Nov	Dec	Year
Mean daily maximum °C (°F)	32.8 (91.0)	33.1 (91.6)	32.6 (90.7)	32.3 (90.1)	32.5 (90.5)	33.2 (91.8)	33.7 (92.7)	34.6 (94.3)	34.7 (94.5)	32.9 (91.2)	31.5 (88.7)	31.8 (89.2)	33.0 (91.4)
Daily mean °C (°F)	27.9 (82.2)	28.1 (82.6)	27.7 (81.9)	27.3 (81.1)	27.5 (81.5)	27.8 (82.0)	28.1 (82.6)	28.9 (84.0)	29.1 (84.4)	27.8 (82.0)	26.9 (80.4)	27.1 (80.8)	27.8 (82.0)
Mean daily minimum °C (°F)	22.4 (72.3)	22.6 (72.7)	22.6 (72.7)	22.5 (72.5)	22.5 (72.5)	22.4 (72.3)	22.5 (72.5)	23.1 (73.6)	23.0 (73.4)	22.5 (72.5)	22.3 (72.1)	22.3 (72.1)	22.5 (72.5)
Average precipitation mm (inches)	100.4 (3.95)	123.6 (4.87)	162.5 (6.40)	149.5 (5.89)	94.9 (3.74)	34.8 (1.37)	31.3 (1.23)	19.9 (0.78)	60.5 (2.38)	204.2 (8.04)	232.3 (9.15)	165.9 (6.53)	1,379.8 (54.32)
Average precipitation days	11	11	15	16	15	11	10	8	10	16	17	15	156
Average relative humidity (%)	69	68	71	72	71	64	58	55	56	67	75	74	66
Mean monthly sunshine hours	204.6	160.9	151.9	150.0	164.3	165.0	170.5	173.6	162.0	170.5	165.0	186.0	2,024.3
Mean daily sunshine hours	6.6	5.7	4.9	5.0	5.3	5.5	5.5	5.6	5.4	5.5	5.5	6.0	5.5
Source: Instituto de Hidrologia Meteorologia y Estudios Ambientales

Climate data for Neiva (Palacio-Vegalarga), elevation 1,100 m (3,600 ft), (1981–2010)
Month	Jan	Feb	Mar	Apr	May	Jun	Jul	Aug	Sep	Oct	Nov	Dec	Year
Mean daily maximum °C (°F)	27.2 (81.0)	27.5 (81.5)	27.2 (81.0)	27.0 (80.6)	27.1 (80.8)	27.4 (81.3)	27.7 (81.9)	28.6 (83.5)	28.8 (83.8)	27.7 (81.9)	26.3 (79.3)	26.4 (79.5)	27.4 (81.3)
Daily mean °C (°F)	22.5 (72.5)	22.6 (72.7)	22.3 (72.1)	22.2 (72.0)	22.3 (72.1)	22.3 (72.1)	22.3 (72.1)	22.8 (73.0)	23.0 (73.4)	22.5 (72.5)	21.9 (71.4)	22.0 (71.6)	22.4 (72.3)
Mean daily minimum °C (°F)	18.6 (65.5)	18.7 (65.7)	18.7 (65.7)	18.5 (65.3)	18.7 (65.7)	18.5 (65.3)	18.2 (64.8)	18.5 (65.3)	18.7 (65.7)	18.5 (65.3)	18.5 (65.3)	18.5 (65.3)	18.5 (65.3)
Average precipitation mm (inches)	121.9 (4.80)	119.8 (4.72)	188.2 (7.41)	181.5 (7.15)	135.3 (5.33)	65.5 (2.58)	53.5 (2.11)	44.3 (1.74)	63.8 (2.51)	212.8 (8.38)	215.6 (8.49)	158.9 (6.26)	1,550.4 (61.04)
Average precipitation days	13	14	19	22	23	19	17	14	16	21	22	18	214
Average relative humidity (%)	77	77	80	81	79	76	73	70	71	77	82	81	77
Mean monthly sunshine hours	158.1	127.0	114.7	108.0	124.0	132.0	142.6	145.7	126.0	117.8	111.0	139.5	1,546.4
Mean daily sunshine hours	5.1	4.5	3.7	3.6	4.0	4.4	4.6	4.7	4.2	3.8	3.7	4.5	4.2
Source: Instituto de Hidrologia Meteorologia y Estudios Ambientales

Climate data for Neiva (Julia La), elevation 1,691 m (5,548 ft), (1981–2010)
Month	Jan	Feb	Mar	Apr	May	Jun	Jul	Aug	Sep	Oct	Nov	Dec	Year
Mean daily maximum °C (°F)	22.6 (72.7)	22.9 (73.2)	22.7 (72.9)	22.7 (72.9)	23.0 (73.4)	23.2 (73.8)	23.1 (73.6)	23.9 (75.0)	24.0 (75.2)	23.1 (73.6)	22.2 (72.0)	22.3 (72.1)	23.0 (73.4)
Daily mean °C (°F)	18.6 (65.5)	18.7 (65.7)	18.6 (65.5)	18.8 (65.8)	18.9 (66.0)	19.0 (66.2)	18.7 (65.7)	19.0 (66.2)	19.1 (66.4)	18.7 (65.7)	18.4 (65.1)	18.5 (65.3)	18.7 (65.7)
Mean daily minimum °C (°F)	15.2 (59.4)	15.2 (59.4)	15.4 (59.7)	15.4 (59.7)	15.3 (59.5)	15.3 (59.5)	15.1 (59.2)	15.3 (59.5)	15.3 (59.5)	15.2 (59.4)	15.1 (59.2)	15.0 (59.0)	15.2 (59.4)
Average precipitation mm (inches)	165.0 (6.50)	170.7 (6.72)	212.6 (8.37)	190.9 (7.52)	139.0 (5.47)	65.7 (2.59)	63.7 (2.51)	48.8 (1.92)	92.2 (3.63)	220.8 (8.69)	229.1 (9.02)	168.7 (6.64)	1,747.5 (68.80)
Average precipitation days	16	15	18	17	16	11	11	9	11	18	21	19	179
Average relative humidity (%)	79	79	80	79	78	77	74	73	74	77	80	80	77
Source: Instituto de Hidrologia Meteorologia y Estudios Ambientales

== Ethnography ==
According to DANE 2018, the ethnography composition of the city is:

- Whites or Europeans descendants and Mestizos: 98.9%
- Indigenous: 0.3%
- Black, Mulatto or Afro-descendant: 0.8%

== Economy ==
Neiva is a distribution center for many consumer goods to the national economy such as rice, coffee, beef, milk, leather by-products and other agricultural products. Its annual agricultural fair held in May showcases horses, cattle and pork from local municipalities and other surrounding towns.

== Tourist attractions ==
Throughout the city a tourist might enjoy the scattered city monuments, especially around the edges of the Magdalena River, where the local government has been maintaining the recently built sanctuary meant to safeguard the Magdalena from any pollutants and human produced contamination. Around this sanctuary there are parks and gardens usually crowded by locals and tourists who came to the growing city. The city can be reached by road travel, or by all major national airlines, coming to the Benito Salas Airport.

== Education ==
Neiva is home to several universities which serve primarily Southern Colombia. Among the most important are the Universidad Surcolombiana, the Corporación Universitaria del Huila, and the Universidad Cooperativa de Colombia.

== Transport ==
=== Air transportation ===
The Benito Salas Airport, named after Benito Salas Vargas, is located inside the city and serves domestic destinations.

== Culture ==
The city is known as the Bambuco capital. José Eustasio Rivera, born in Rivera, is the most famous writer of a "pléyade" of creators that lived in Neiva (Regulo Suárez, Eustaquio Álvarez, Felio Andrade, Antonio Iriarte, Yezid Morales, Humberto Calderón, Jorge Guebelly, Luis Alberto Campos, Winston Morales, Jader Rivera, David Alberto Campos)

=== Festivals and events ===
This city is known for the Festival Folclórico y Reinado Nacional del Bambuco festivities held between the last two weeks of June and early July. During this time, there are daily parades through the downtown area and showings of the Sanjuanero, a folk dance, where the participants dress in typical costumes and compete for being the best performers of the Sanjuanero choreography.

=== Sports ===
Soccer is currently the most popular sport in the city. The city is the base for the Atlético Huila club which competes in the second division of the Colombian professional association football league, the Categoría Primera B. The games are played at the Estadio Guillermo Plazas Alcid stadium.

Basketball historically had a high popularity, although it has decreased in recent years. The city's basketball games are played at the Coliseo Álvaro Sánchez Silva court.

The city has hosted important national and international sport events. For example:

- XI National Games of Colombia 1980
- Juvenile Finswimming World Championship 2008
- South American Basketball Championship 2010
- FIBA Americas Championship for Women 2011

== Notable people ==
- Misael Pastrana Borrero, president of Colombia
- Olga Duque de Ospina, senator and governor of Huila
- Rodrigo Lara, lawyer and politician
- Natalia Valenzuela, model, presenter and beauty pageant titleholder
- Claudia Bahamón, model and presenter
- María Alejandra Salazar, model and beauty pageant titleholder
- Sebastián Garzón, racing driver

== See also ==
- Immaculate Conception Cathedral, Neiva
- Neiva National Telegraph and Post Office Building

== Gallery ==
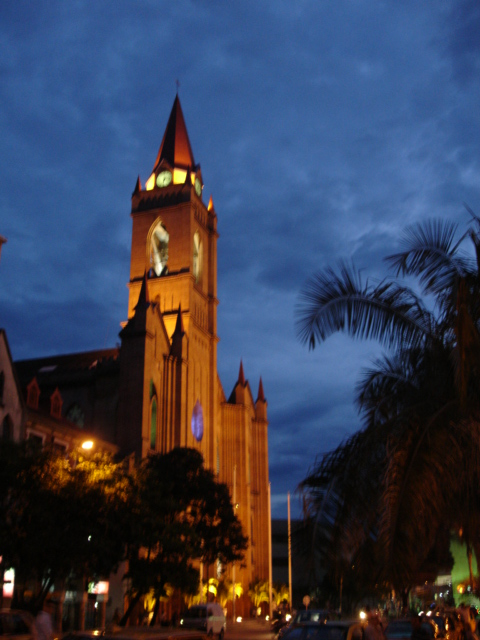
Catedral de Neiva

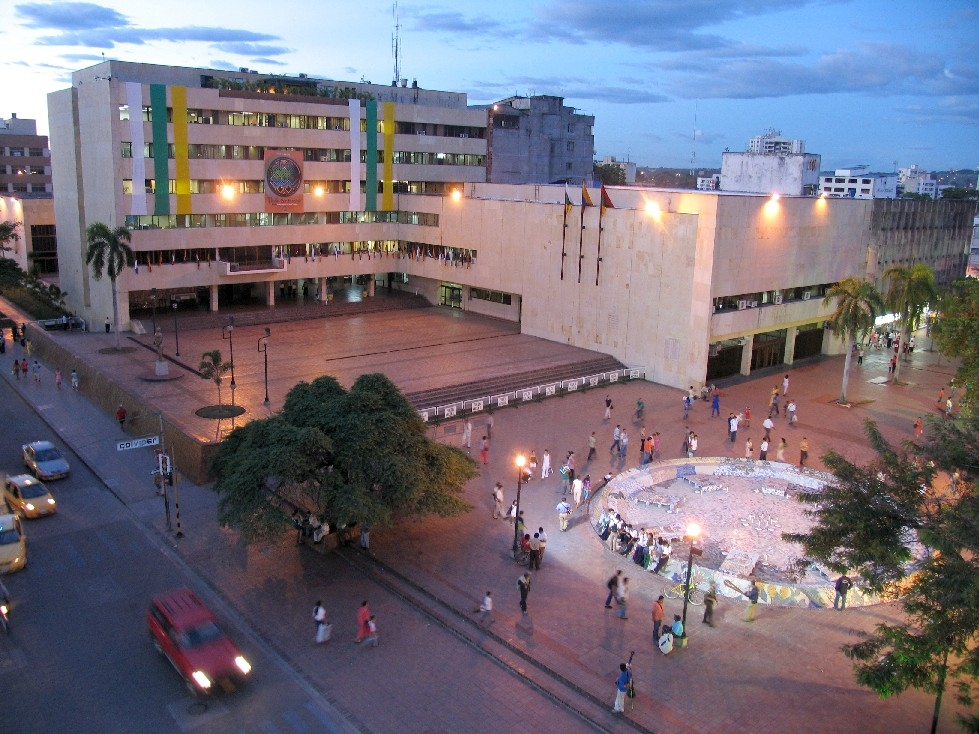
Government office in Neiva

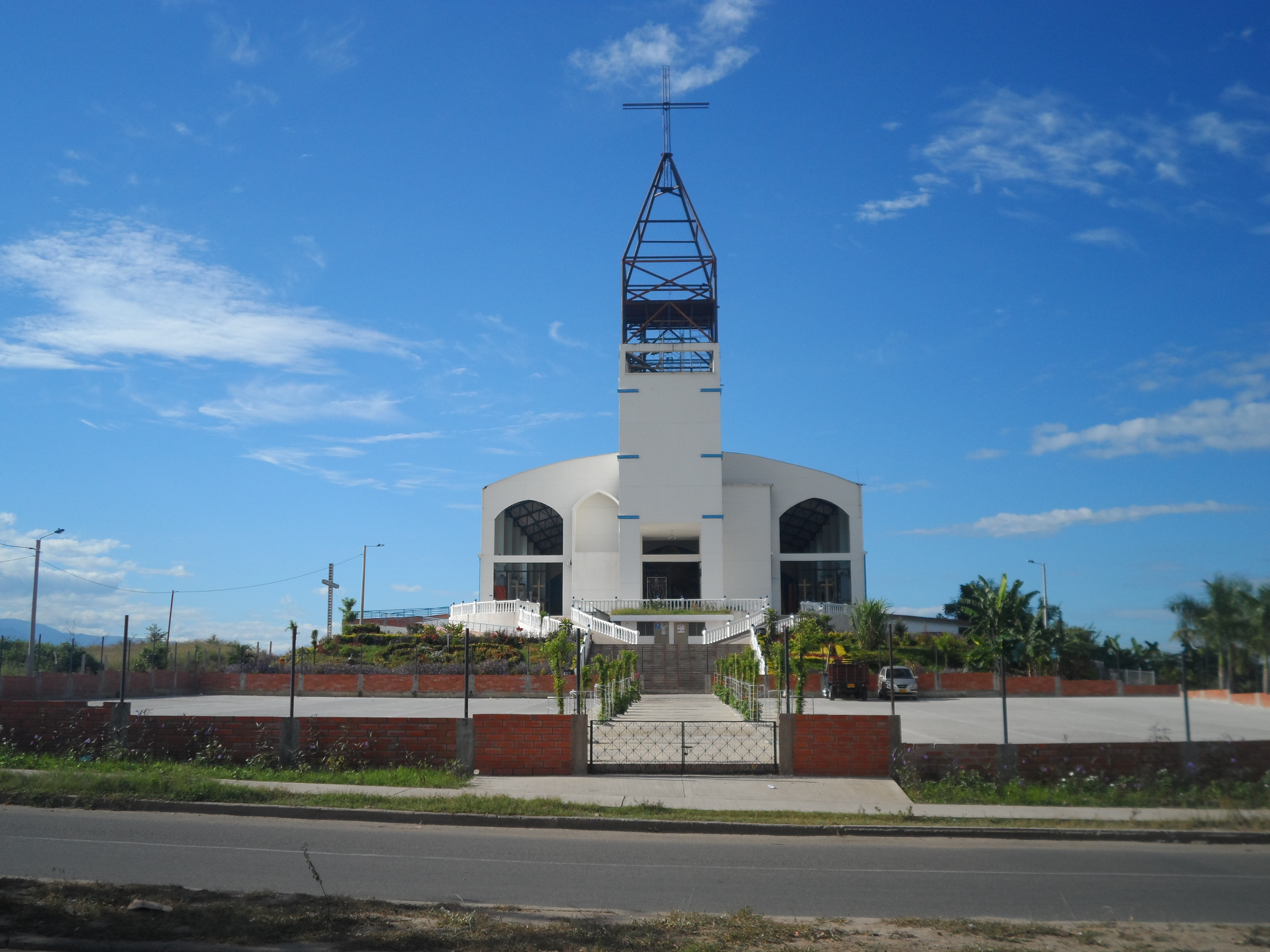
Church of St. George in Neiva

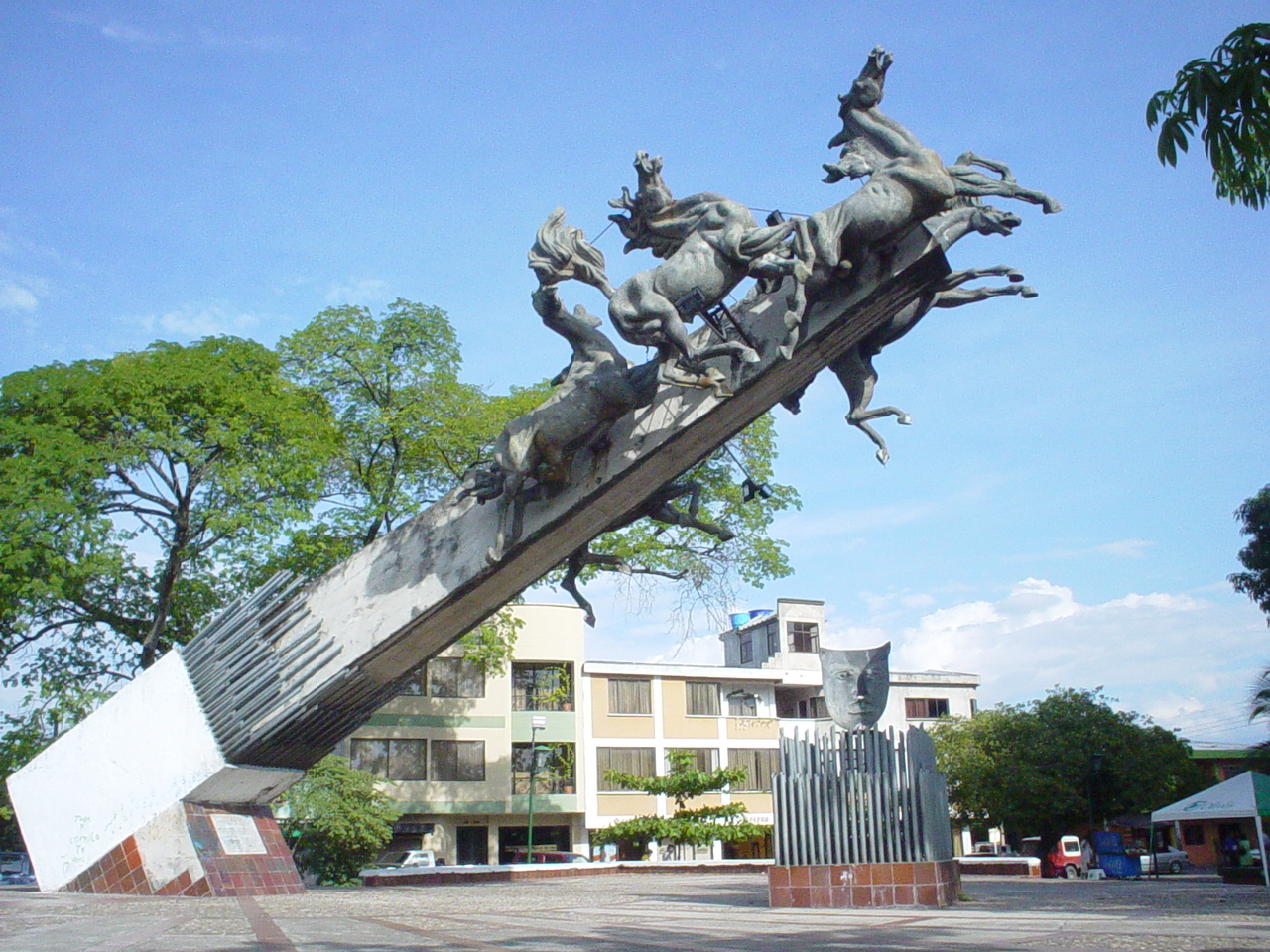
Los Potros, a tribute to José Eustasio Rivera by Rodrigo Arenas Betancur, in Neiva

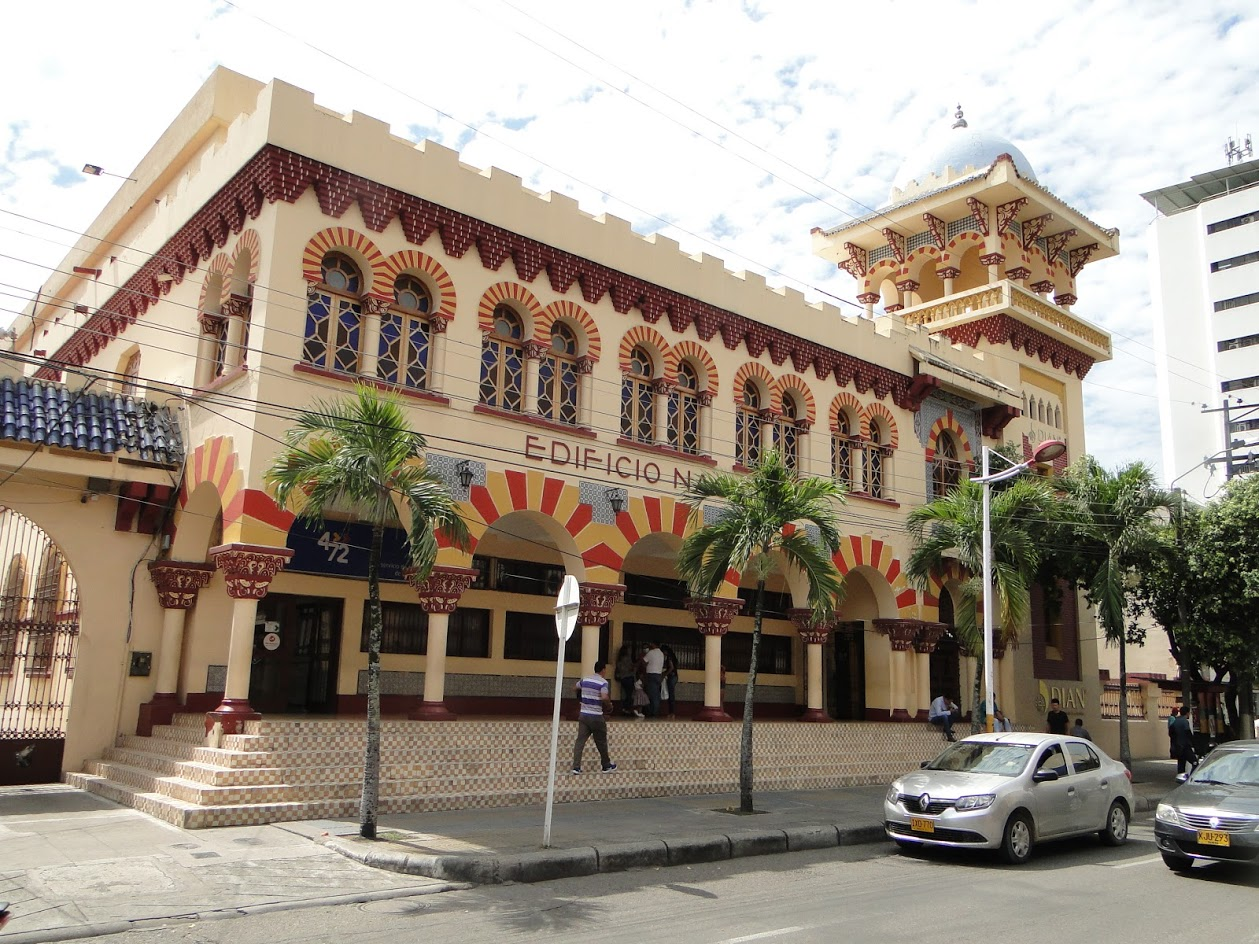
Office building in Neiva

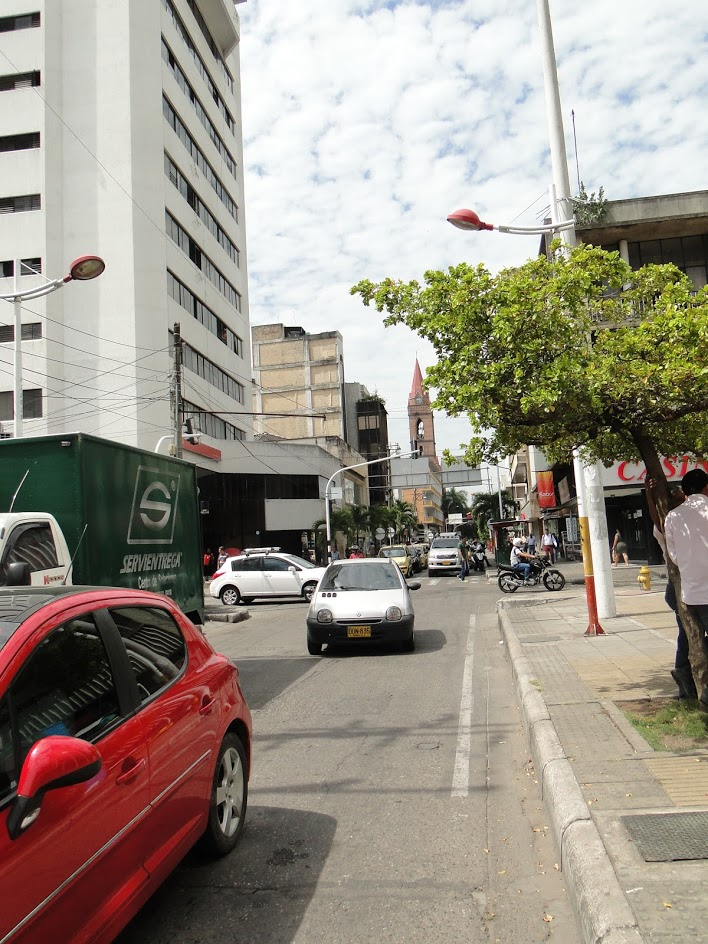
On the main street

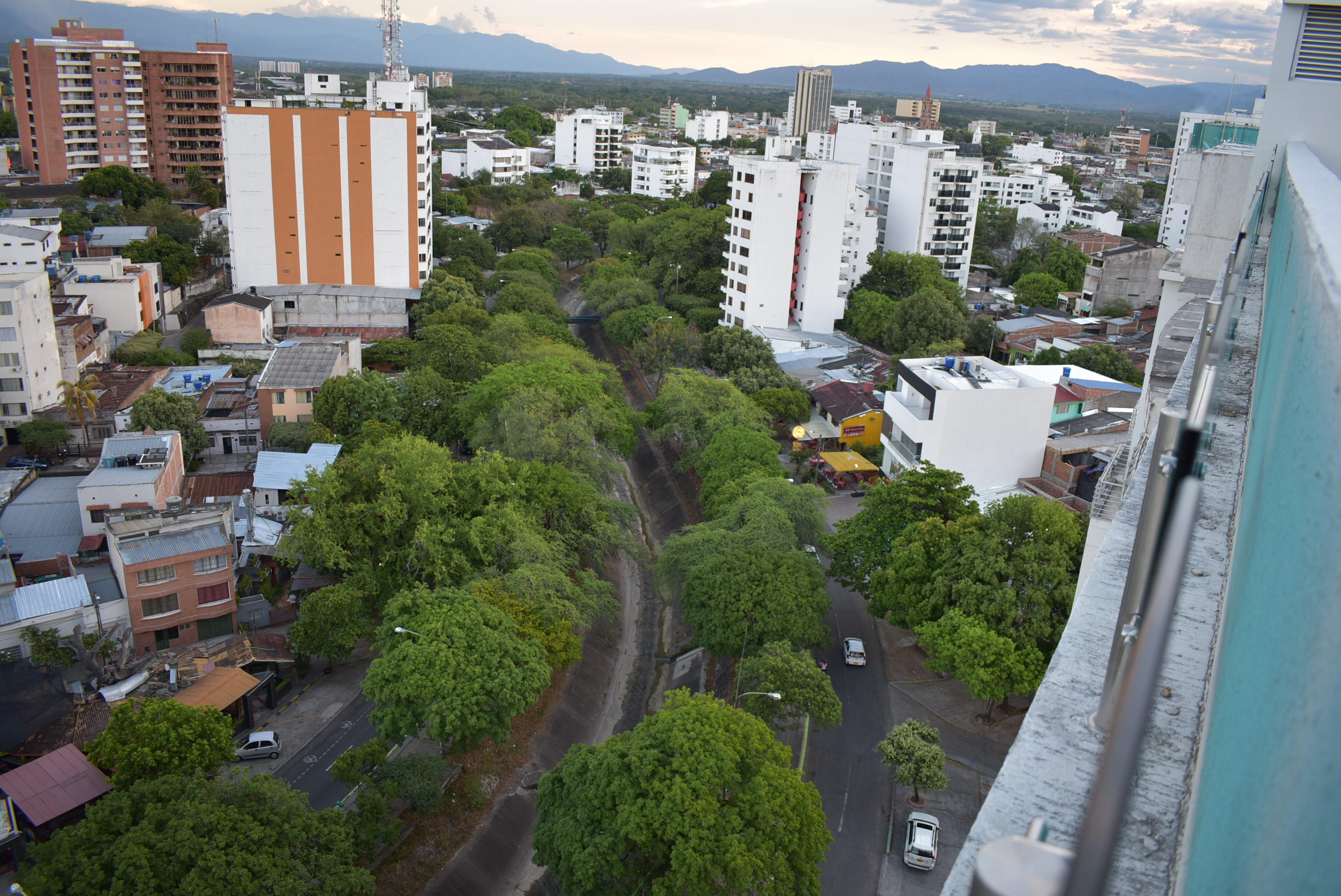
Toma Avenue in downtown Neiva
