= 2013 in Colombia =

- Decades: 1990s; 2000s; 2010s; 2020s
- See also: Other events of 2013; Timeline of Colombian history

The following lists events that happened in 2013 in Colombia.

== Incumbents ==
- President: Juan Manuel Santos (2010-2018)
- Vice President: Angelino Garzón (2010-2014)

== Events ==
=== January ===
- 1 January – 13 FARC members are killed in an airstrike by the Colombian military.
- 19 January – A drug lord named Amaury Smith Pomare, who had long been wanted by the police, is arrested at his villa on the Atlantic coast of Honduras.
- 20 January – FARC rebels dynamite two southern oil pipelines and planted a bomb on the top coal exporter's northern railway after the end of a rebel ceasefire.
- 22 January – FARC rebels dynamite two southern oil pipelines and planted a bomb on the top coal exporter's northern railway after the end of a rebel ceasefire.

=== February ===
- 9 February – A magnitude 6.9 earthquake strikes southwest Colombia, causing major disruption to the region and injuring at least 8 people.
- 25 February – Coffee growers of the country start a labour strike protesting the situations in which coffee growing is practiced.

=== March ===
- 8 March – The strike of the coffee growers is over.

=== April ===
- Nohra Padilla, a pioneer and executive director of the Association of Recyclers of Bogotá, was awarded the 2013 Goldman Environmental Prize for her contribution to waste management and recycling in Colombia.

=== May ===
- 5 May – A ceremony commemorating the first sacred indigenous land to be designated under a new protected land status occurs, formally transferring Jaba Tañiwashkaka in La Guajira to the Kogi people.

=== June ===
- 10 June – The Venezuelan government arrests nine Colombian right-wing paramilitaries over a plot to assassinate President Nicolás Maduro.

=== July ===
- 20 July – government soldiers are killed in an attack by FARC revolutionaries in the Colombian department of Arauca.
- 22 July – The presidents of Colombia and Venezuela meet to resolve a high-level diplomatic dispute.

=== August ===
- 19 August – An agrarian strike is planned for today in Colombia to demand labor rights.

=== October ===
- 12 October – A building collapses in Colombia, killing 1, with 10 still missing.

=== November ===
- 9 November – A gunman kills eight people in a bar in Cali.

=== December ===
- 9 December – Gustavo Petro, mayor of Bogotá, is removed from office and banned from re-taking it for fifteen years, due to a failing city cleaning policy promoted by him.
- 14 December – A mass protest is held in Bogotá in protest against the unseating of Mayor Gustavo Petro.

== Deaths ==
- 13 September – Graciela Salgado, drummer, singer, and songwriter
