= Juan Madera Castro =

Juan Bautista Madera Castro (May 7, 1922 – July 28, 2024) was a Colombian composer and clarinetist, best known as the creator of the famous cumbia song "La Pollera Colorá".

In 2021 he was awarded the Medal of Cultural Merit from the Ministry of Culture (Colombia) for his outstanding contribution to Colombian culture.
