= Nule Group corruption scandal =

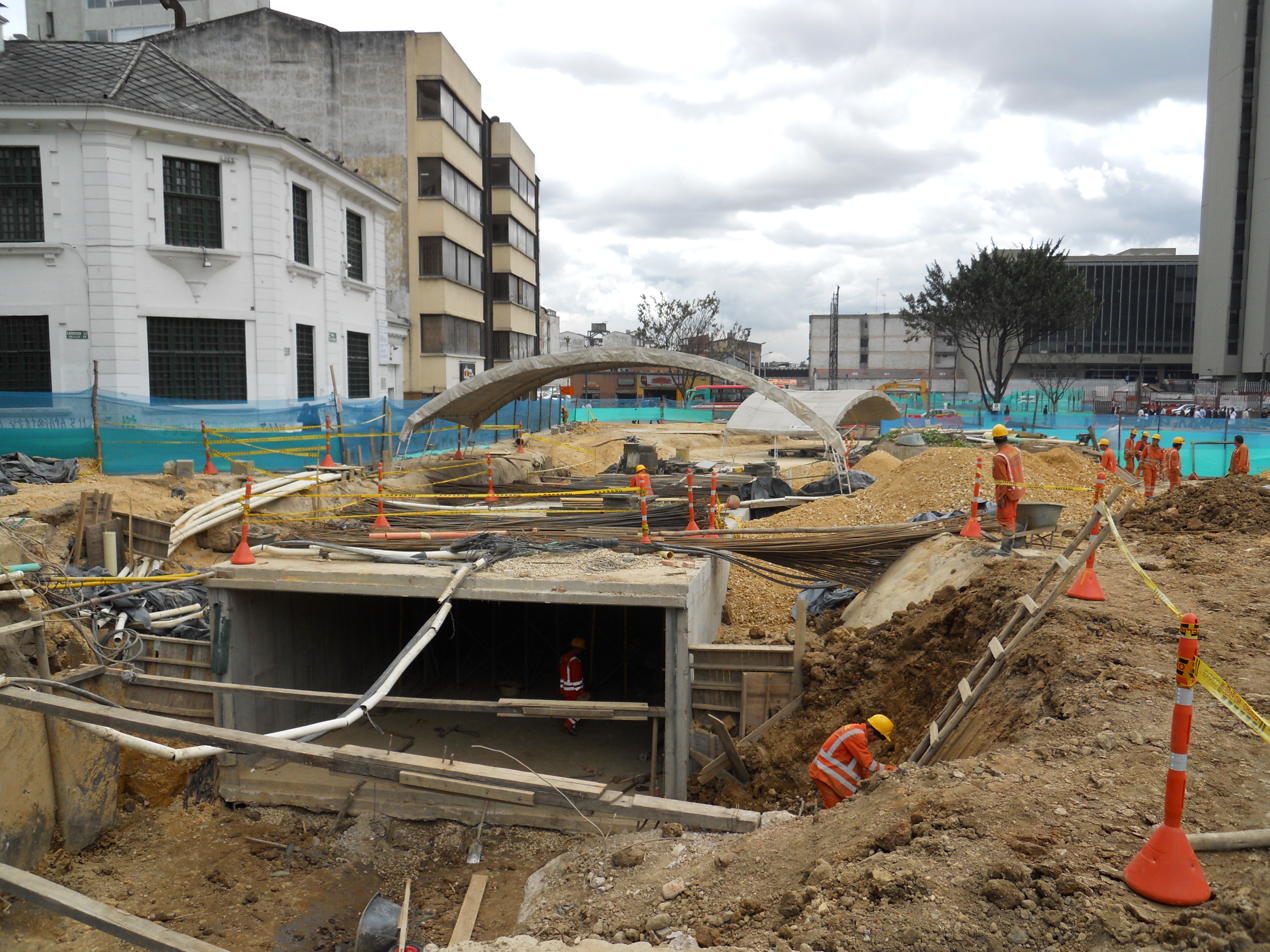
The construction contract for the Calle 26 TransMilenio was awarded in 2007 and was forecast to be finished by 2009. The almost two years in delay in the execution of the work turned it into the symbol of the scandal.

The Nule Group corruption scandal (Spanish: Carrusel de la Contratación = "Contract Carousel") is a case of political corruption that took place in the city of Bogotá during the administration of former mayor Samuel Moreno Rojas of the Polo Democrático Alternativo party in 2010. The controversy exploded on June 25 of that year when secret recordings surfaced of the multimillion-dollar commission negotiations between Germán Olano, a former Colombian congressman, and construction mogul Miguel Nule Velilla, whose company, the Nule Group, handled many Bogotá public works contracts.

This scandal eventually led to many at the top of the Nule Group pleading guilty to embezzling millions of dollars meant for the construction of the Transmilenio public transport system and of roads in the city. Guido, Manuel, and Miguel Nule were charged with embezzlement, bribery, and conspiracy. At a pretrial hearing, Miguel said they had paid a 6% commission to the mayor and to Senator Iván Moreno Rojas, and called it extortion. Subsequent investigations revealed further corruption and several politicians, businessmen, leaders of the Institute of Urban Development and even the mayor himself were implicated. Mayor Moreno was consequently suspended from office in 2011 and has now been formally accused of corruption, bribery, embezzlement by appropriation, and extortion. The national government lost nearly one trillion Colombian pesos (roughly $521 million) as a result of the crime. Olano surrendered to Colombian authorities on his return from Miami in May 2011.

The corruption scandal is considered one of the biggest in recent Colombian history.
