= David Sánchez Juliao =

Ambassador of Colombia (1945–2011)

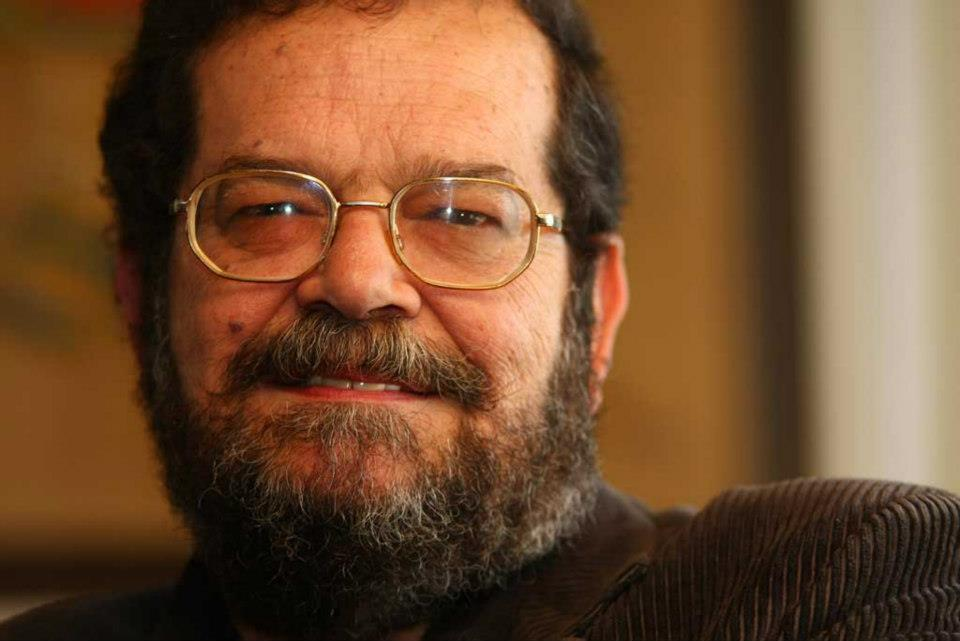

Colombia Ambassador to Egypt
- In office 1995–1996
- President: Ernesto Samper Pizano

Colombia Ambassador to India
- In office 1991–1993
- President: César Gaviria

Personal details
- Born: David Sánchez Juliao; November 24, 1945 Santa Cruz de Lorica, Córdoba, Colombia.
- Died: February 9, 2011 (aged 65) Bogotá, Colombia.
- Occupation: Writer, ambassador, short story, journalist.
- Website: http://www.davidsanchezjuliao.com/

David Sánchez Juliao (November 24, 1945 – February 9, 2011) was a Colombian author, journalist, storyteller and diplomat.

Sánchez Juliao was born in Lorica. He was the Colombian ambassador to India during the César Gaviria administration and ambassador to Egypt during the Ernesto Samper administration. Among his most important works are: El pachanga, El flecha, El flecha II el retorno (2006), Abraham al humor, Fosforito, Historias de Racamandaca y Dulce Veneno Moreno.

Sanchez Juliao's works have been translated into 15 languages and received a number of literary prizes. Sánchez Juliao's works provide an outline of the culture of Colombia's North Coast, and the Córdoba region specifically.

Sanchez Juliao died in Bogotá on February 9, 2011, at the age of 65.

== Published works ==
- ¿Porqué me llevas al hospital en canoa, papá? (1973)
- Historias de Racamandaca (1974)
- El arca de Noé (1976)
- Cachaco, palomo y gato (1977)
- El Flecha
- Pero sigo siendo el rey (1983)
- Mi sangre aunque plebeya (1986)
- Buenos días, América (1988)
- El país más hermoso del mundo (desconocido)
- Dulce Veneno Moreno
- Fosforito
- La cucarachita Martínez
