= 2003 Colombian constitutional referendum =

25 October 2003

1. Incapacity in public office
For	93.33%
Against	4.68%
Invalid	1.99%

2. Restricted voting to the electoral roll
For	94.35%
Against	3.73%
Invalid	1.92%

3. Abolishing replacement members
For	93.27%
Against	4.72%
Invalid	2.01%

4. Congressional input to public broadcasters
For	86.52%
Against	11.44%
Invalid	2.03%

5. MPs working for parliamentary services
For	93.60%
Against	4.67%
Invalid	1.72%

6. Reduction in size of Congress and councils
For	93.00%
Against	5.16%
Invalid	1.83%

7. Removing public officials from office
For	94.71%
Against	3.65%
Invalid	1.65%

8. Pensions for public sector workers
For	90.06%
Against	7.93%
Invalid	2.01%

9. Abolition of regional and local audit offices
For	90.57%
Against	7.51%
Invalid	1.92%

10. No public money for election campaigns
For	94.73%
Against	4.64%
Invalid	1.79%

11. Money from abolished audit offices used on health and education
For	93.87%
Against	4.47%
Invalid	1.66%

12. Redistribution of education and health funds
For	90.16%
Against	4.62%
Invalid	1.99%

13. Freeze government spending for two years
For	80.28%
Against	17.40%
Invalid	2.32%

14. Parties with less than 2% of the vote lose legal status
For	91.06%
Against	7.02%
Invalid	1.92%

15. Immediate implementation of the reforms
For	93.71%
Against	4.62%
Invalid	1.66%

A fifteen-part constitutional referendum was held in Colombia on 25 October 2003. Whilst all fifteen proposals were approved by voters, only one question had a sufficient numbers of votes to pass the 25% quorum requirement.

== Background ==
After taking office in August 2002, President Álvaro Uribe put forward several constitutional reforms. The Congress approved the proposals on 20 December 2002, but also suggested several changes, including reducing the size of the Chamber of Representatives and the Senate by a fifth rather than creating a unicameral Congress, and forcing parties that received less than 2% of the vote in elections to disband.

Uribe subsequently signed the changes into law, and they were submitted to the Constitutional Court on 22 January 2003. On 9 July the Court passed judgement that the referendum was valid, but that four questions were not acceptable.

Under articles 374 and 378 of the Constitution, proposed amendments to the constitution require a quorum of 25% of registered voters casting a valid vote, and a majority of those who have voted to vote in favour.

== Results ==
#	Subject	For		Against		Invalid		Quorum		Blank votes	Total	Registered voters	Turnout
#	Subject	Votes	%	Votes	%	Votes	%	Votes	%	Blank votes	Total	Registered voters	Turnout
1	Incapacity in public office	5,874,193	93.33	294,348	4.68	125,266	1.99	6,293,807	25.11	379,243	6,673,050	25,069,773	26.62
2	Restricted voting to the electoral roll	5,871,354	94.35	232,121	3.73	119,213	1.92	6,222,688	24.82	450,362	6,673,050	25,069,773	26.62
3	Abolishing replacement members	5,839,612	93.27	295,616	4.72	125,850	2.01	6,261,078	24.97	411,972	6,673,050	25,069,773	26.62
4	Congressional input to public broadcasters	5,319,557	86.52	703,634	11.44	124,915	2.03	6,148,106	24.52	524,944	6,673,050	25,069,773	26.62
5	MPs working for parliamentary services	5,668,819	93.60	283,030	4.67	104,406	1.72	6,056,255	24.16	616,795	6,673,050	25,069,773	26.62
6	Reduction in size of Congress and councils	5,328,733	93.00	295,908	5.16	105,040	1.83	5,729,681	22.85	943,369	6,673,050	25,069,773	26.62
7	Removing public officials from office	5,403,139	94.71	208,100	3.65	93,982	1.65	5,705,221	22.76	967,829	6,673,050	25,069,773	26.62
8	Pensions for public sector workers	5,602,823	90.06	493,563	7.93	124,926	2.01	6,221,312	24.82	451,738	6,673,050	25,069,773	26.62
9	Abolition of regional and local audit offices	5,557,950	90.57	460,941	7.51	117,946	1.92	6,136,837	24.48	536,213	6,673,050	25,069,773	26.62
10	No public money for election campaigns	5,174,738	94.73	283,440	4.64	109,104	1.79	6,107,282	24.36	565,768	6,673,050	25,069,773	26.62
11	Money from abolished audit offices used on health and education	5,668,878	93.87	270,039	4.47	100,384	1.66	6,039,301	24.09	633,749	6,673,050	25,069,773	26.62
12	Redistribution of education and health funds	5,587,469	90.16	285,842	4.62	123,228	1.99	6,187,539	24.68	485,511	6,673,050	25,069,773	26.62
13	Freeze government spending for two years	4,907,283	80.28	1,063,877	17.40	141,545	2.32	6,112,705	24.38	560,345	6,673,050	25,069,773	26.62
14	Parties with less than 2% of the vote lose legal status	5,457,866	91.06	420,859	7.02	115,300	1.92	5,994,025	23.91	679,025	6,673,050	25,069,773	26.62
15	Immediate implementation of the reforms	5,457,951	93.71	270,249	4.62	97,197	1.66	5,843,397	23.31	829,653	6,673,050	25,069,773	26.62
Source: Direct Democracy

== Aftermath ==
Following the referendum, President Uribe objected to the presence of 700,000 voters on the electoral roll, whose removal would have meant nine of the fifteen questions passing the quorum. However, his protests were rejected by the National Electoral Council on 19 December 2003.
