= La Pollera Colorá =

Song
- Genre: Cumbia
- Songwriter: Juan Madera Castro/Wilson Choperena

"La Pollera Colorá" ("Red Pollera") is a Colombian cumbia song. It was composed in 1960 as an instrumental by clarinetist Juan Madera Castro. Singer-songwriter Wilson Choperena composed the lyrics in 1962.

== Rankings ==
It has been rated as one of the best Colombian songs of all time by multiple media sources:

- In its list of the ten most iconic Colombian songs, El Nuevo Siglo, rated La Pollera Colorá at No. 1.
- In its list of the 50 best Colombian songs of all time, El Tiempo, Colombia's most widely circulated newspaper, ranked the version of the song recorded by Wilson Choperena with the Pedro Salceo orchestra at No. 5.
- In its list of the top ten Colombian songs, El Heraldo rated Colombia Tierra Querida at No. 7.
- Viva Music Colombia rated the song No. 10 on its list of the 100 most important Colombian songs of all time.

== Ownership controversy ==
Ownership of the rights to the song was later subject of legal proceedings. The song was registered with Wilson Choperena as the author of the lyrics and Juan Bautista Madera Castro as the author of the music. Castro accused Choperena of appropriating the song's rights. He found contracts of Choperena with record labels in which all rights to the song were assigned to him. Choperena was sentenced, in 2010, to 24 months in prison and ordered to pay a fine of more than 10 million Colombian pesos.

== Versions ==
It is one of the most popular Colombian songs. It has been recorded by many artists including the following:

- Alberto Barros
- Carolina la O
- Wilson Choperena
- Juan Diego Flórez
- La Sonora Dinamita
- La Sonora Ponceña
- Los Corraleros de Majagual
- Los Llopis
- Los Wawancó
- Margarita la Diosa de la Cumbia
- Gonzalo Martinez
- Aniceto Molina
- Carmen Rivero
- Pedro Salcedo & His Orchestra
- Tropical Panamá
- Charlie Zaa
- Yuri
