= United Nations Security Council Resolution 1465 =

UN Security Council Resolution 1465
- Colombia
- Date: 13 February 2003
- Meeting no.: 4,706
- Code: S/RES/1465 (Document)
- Subject: Threats to international peace and security caused by terrorist acts
- Voting summary: 15 voted for; None voted against; None abstained
- Result: Adopted

Security Council composition
- Permanent members: China; France; Russia; United Kingdom; United States
- Non-permanent members: Angola; Bulgaria; Chile; Cameroon; Germany; Guinea; Mexico; Pakistan; Spain; Syria

United Nations Security Council resolution 1465, adopted unanimously on 13 February 2003, after reaffirming the principles of the United Nations Charter and Resolution 1373 (2001), the council condemned the bomb attack outside the El Nogal Club in Bogotá, Colombia on 7 February 2003.

The Security Council reaffirmed the need to combat threats to international peace and security caused by terrorist acts and condemned the bomb attack in the Colombian capital in which many people died and people injured. It expressed sympathy and condolences to the families of the victims and the people and government of Colombia.

The resolution called upon all states to co-operate with and provide assistance to the Colombian authorities to bring the perpetrators to justice in accordance with their obligations under Resolution 1373. Finally, the council concluded by expressing its determination to combat all forms of terrorism.

== See also ==
- 2003 El Nogal Club bombing
- Colombian armed conflict (1964–present)
- List of United Nations Security Council Resolutions 1401 to 1500 (2002–2003)
