= José Emeterio Rivas =

Colombian radio journalist (c. 1957–2003)

- Born: c. 1957 or '58
- Died: April 6, 2003; Magdalena Medio Antioquia in Northeastern Colombia
- Cause of death: Gun shots
- Body discovered: next to Magdalena River
- Occupation: Radio journalist
- Employer: Radio Calor Estéreo
- Known for: Hosting a hard-hitting radio program in Colombia

José Emeterio Rivas (c. 1957 or '58 – April 6, 2003) was a Colombian radio journalist and host of the talk show "Las Fuerzas Vivas" (Translated: "Live Forces") for Radio Calor Estéreo in Barrancabermeja, Magdalena Medio Antioquia, Colombia. Rivas was murdered along with another man by a paramilitary group. Unlike most murderers of journalists in Columbia, Rivas' murderer was brought to justice.

== Personal ==
José Emeterio Rivas lived in Barrancabermeja, Colombia. He was 44 years old and a father of two children.

At one point, Rivas ran for senate where he acquired more than 8000 votes.

== Career ==
Rivas was a political radio journalist for the Radio Calor Estéreo. He hosted a morning public affairs show called "Fuerzas Vivas" (Translated: "Live Forces") with opinions about politics that critics found to be insulting to some Barrancabermeja politicians. On his program, Rivas accused the mayor of corruption and collaboration with members of the right-wing paramilitary group United Self-Defense Forces of Colombia, known as the AUC. He had called the mayor a "plunderer".

== Death ==
Barrancabermeja in Colombia compared to the Colombian capital Bogotá.

On April 5, 2003, a day before his death, José Emeterio Rivas publicly accused the town's mayor Julio César Ardila Torres and other local politicians of corruption and collaboration with members of the right-wing paramilitary group AUC. It was said that Rivas called Ardila a "plunderer" in the television appearance.

The next day Rivas was murdered in Barrancabermeja but detectives found his corpse seven days after his killing in the same spot he had been shot, next to Colombia's Magdalena River. Rivas's body was alongside another body of a man named Paolo César Montesinos, a 22-year-old college student majoring in Environmental Engineering at the University Institute of Peace. It is not known why these two bodies were found together. When Riva's body was found, there were four bullet holes in his abdomen, indicating that he probably died almost instantly.

=== Investigation ===
There was an investigation after the bodies were found and it took them about ten years to finalize the case and send the men to prison that were involved.

Diego Waldrón, a colleague to Rivas, told Committee to Protect Journalists that Rivas had received repeated death threats. It was after hearing this that the detectives linked some killers to Rivas's murder.

The mayor and his three collaborators, Fabio Pajón Lizcano, Abelardo Rueda Tobón, and Juan Pablo Ariza, who were a few of his high-up officials, had hired militia leaders to kill Rivas with the reward for $68,000. A militia leader by the name of Bedoya later admitted his participation as a material author in Riva's death. Ardila was sentenced to 28 years and eight months in prison and Lizcano and Tobón were each sentenced to 26 years and eight months in prison. Along with imprisonment, the mayor was also fined 1,192 million pesos (US $531,000).

The case continued in 2016, with the arrest of Elkin Bueno Altahona, a.k.a., "Ernesto Báez," who was the mayor of Barrancabermeja mayor until 2015 and president of the Colombian Federation of Municipalities, on suspicion of being at a meeting where Rivas's murder was discussed and receiving financial support for one of his political campaigns.

== Context ==
Armed paramilitary groups threaten journalists in Colombia and were hired for Riva's murder by the town mayor at the time. This shows how easy it is for someone of power to hire a paramilitary group to do a job.

Due to impunity, it is still dangerous for journalists in Colombia. Although they are doing their job by stating their political opinions, like Rivas when he called the mayor a "plunderer", there are very few cases reported that have been brought to justice after death threats and murders to a journalist.

== Impact ==
The Rivas case affected Colombia because it was the first case of a journalist killing in a long time that someone was found responsible for the death. From 1994-2009 there were 57 journalists killed and of those 57, over 70 percent of them went unpunished.

The impunity, exemption from punishment, in Colombia is said to be one of the highest and is still a threat.

== Reactions ==
The Inter American Press Association found reason to be "optimistic" about the convictions in Rivas's case.

The Committee to Protect Journalists released a statement after the case was resolved in the courts: "We welcome the sentencing of these three former officials for plotting the murder of José Emeterio Rivas. This is the first time in recent Colombian history that the masterminds of a journalist's murder were effectively prosecuted and punished. We commend the attorney general's office and its human rights unit for taking this crucial step forward in the campaign to end impunity in the murders of journalists around the world."

== See also ==
- Human rights in Colombia
