= Alberto Zalamea Costa =

Colombian journalist, politician, and diplomat

Alberto Zalamea
- Born: Alberto Zalamea Costa; Bogotá, Colombia
- Died: 2 September 2011 (aged 82); Bogotá, Colombia
- Occupations: Politician, journalist and diplomat
- Years active: 20th century

Alberto Zalamea Costa (24 August 1929 – 2 September 2011) was a Colombian journalist, politician, and diplomat. He served as the ambassador of Colombia to Côte d'Ivoire, Venezuela and Italy.

Zalamea began his early career as a journalist. His first job in journalism was with the La Razon newspaper. By 1959, Zalamea had been promoted to the editor of La Semana. A strong proponent of freedom of the press, Zalamea operated a magazine called La Nueva Prensa. He also became a columnist for El Tiempo and Revista Cromos. Zalamea was elected to the Chamber of Representatives of Colombia in 1970. He later became a diplomat, serving as Colombia's ambassador to Côte d'Ivoire, Venezuela and Italy.

== Death ==
Zalamea underwent hip surgery in 2011, which preceded a decline in his health. He died on 2 September 2011, aged 82, and was survived by his wife, Cecilia Fajardo.
