= 2003 El Nogal Club bombing =

Terrorist attack in Colombia in 2003

El Nogal Club bombing
- Part of Colombian conflict
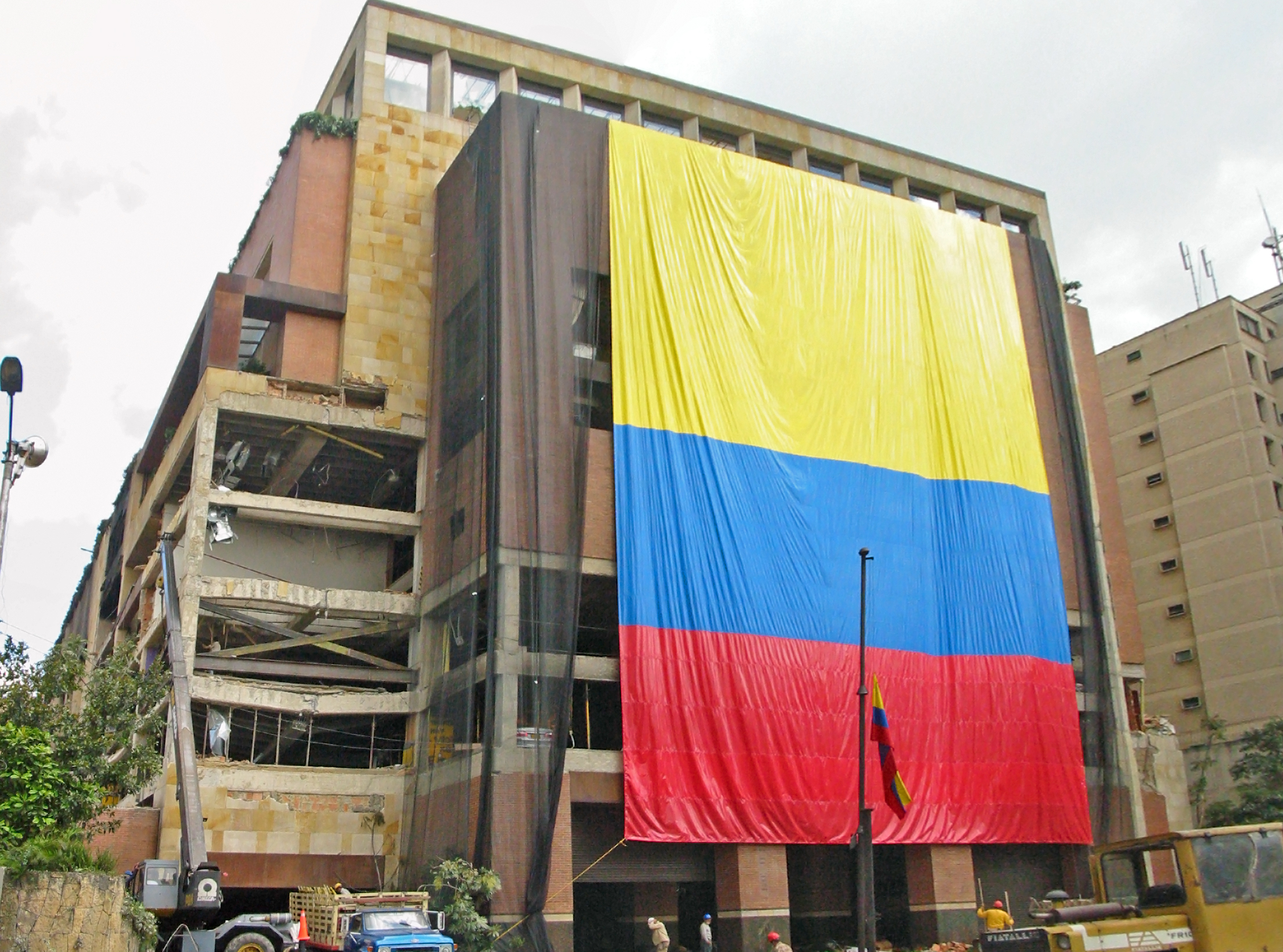
- The club during reconstruction after the attack.

- 2003 El Nogal Club bombing (Colombia)
- Location: 4°39′36.8″N 74°03′02.3″W; Bogotá D.C., Colombia
- Date: February 7, 2003; 23 years ago c. 20:15 (COT)
- Target: El Nogal club
- Attack type: Car bomb
- Deaths: 36
- Injuries: 200+
- Perpetrators: FARC; John Freddy Arellan

The 2003 El Nogal Club bombing (Spanish: Atentado al Club El Nogal de 2003) was a terrorist attack that occurred in Bogotá, Colombia. On 7 February 2003, a car containing 200 kg of explosives that was parked in a garage on the third floor of the multi-story El Nogal club, an elite, high-class social and business club, exploded, killing 36 people and wounding more than 200. There were approximately 600 people in the building at the time of the explosion. The attack was the worst in Colombia for more than a decade.

No group publicly claimed responsibility for the bombing. The United Nations adopted Security Council Resolution 1465 on 13 February 2003 condemning the attack.

Colombian Vice President Francisco Santos Calderón blamed the guerrilla group FARC, saying that there was "not the slightest doubt" that they were responsible and that the government had enough evidence of its involvement. Colombian authorities and investigators, with the aid of ATF members from the U.S., inspected the scene and the remains of the car bomb. Colombian prosecutors linked FARC to the bombing through the participation of, among others, John Freddy Arellan, a squash instructor who died in the bombing. According to the government, Arellan had recently acquired membership in the club and drove the explosives-laden car, a vehicle which had been bought in late 2002 using false documents, into the parking area. The government claimed Arrellan would have been employed by FARC's "Javier Paz", not knowing that the bomb would be detonated with him and his uncle still inside the club.

On 10 March 2003, FARC denied any responsibility for the attack and described it as "state terrorism", claiming that the government of Colombia planted the bomb in order to unite the country against them.

In March 2008, Colombian authorities released documents said to be found in a computer belonging to the slain FARC commander "Raúl Reyes", including a 13 February 2003 message in which "Reyes" called the attack a "formidable act" and mentioned the "political convenience of denying responsibilities".
