= Gloria Valencia de Castaño =

Colombian journalist and television presenter

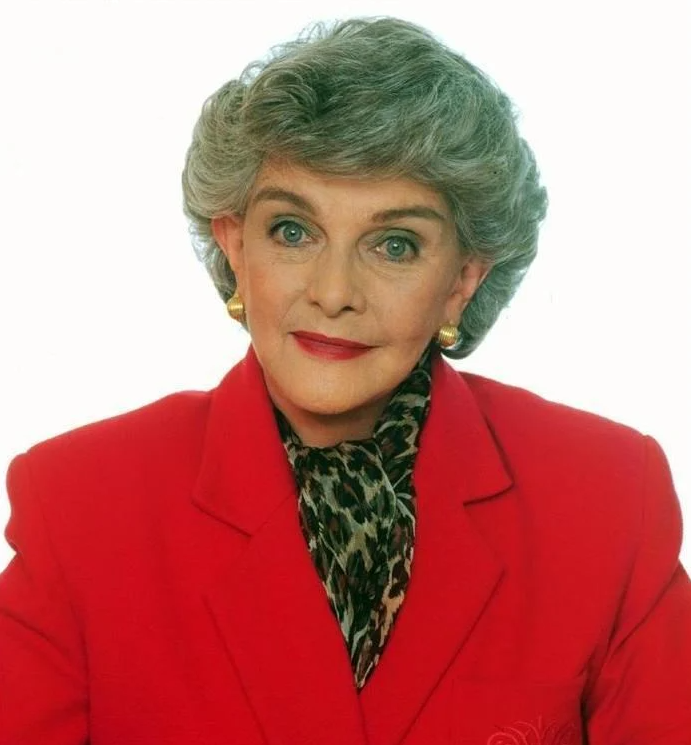

Gloria Valencia de Castaño (27 July 1927 – 24 March 2011) was a Colombian journalist and television presenter, best known as the "first lady" of Colombian television. She was born in Ibagué and died in Bogotá.
