= 2003 Zona Rosa attacks =

Terrorist attack in Bogotá, Colombia on November 15, 2003

- Part of the Colombian conflict
- 2003 Zona Rosa attacks (Colombia)
- Location: Zona Rosa, Bogotá, Colombia
- Date: 15 November 2003; 10:30 pm
- Weapon: Fragmentation grenades
- Deaths: 1
- Injuries: 73
- Perpetrator: FARC

On November 15, 2003, in a terrorist attack, grenades were thrown in two bars in the wealthy Zona Rosa neighborhood of Bogotá, Colombia, killing one person, injuring 73 and badly damaging the premises.

The authorities blamed Revolutionary Armed Forces of Colombia (FARC) guerillas for the attack. The fatal victim was a young woman. Three Americans and a German were among the injured. It was believed the FARC targeted Americans in the attack. The U.S. government provided $2.5 billion to the Colombian government in its fight against rebels and drug traffickers. The attack was the sixth in Bogotá that year, and prompted security concerns to residents amid the rebels' increasing attacks in urban areas.

The national police captured one of the men who threw the grenades.
