= 2021 in Colombia =

- Decades: 2000s; 2010s; 2020s
- See also: Other events of 2021; Timeline of Colombian history

Events in the year 2021 in Colombia.

== Incumbents ==
- President: Iván Duque Márquez
- Vice President: Marta Lucía Ramírez

== Events ==
- Continuous— COVID-19 pandemic in Colombia

=== January ===
- January 5 – General Luis Fernando Navarro says that illegal armed groups lost 5,120 members in 2020. The number includes deaths, capture, and desertions. He said the National Liberation Army (ELN) still has 2,450 members and Revolutionary Armed Forces of Colombia (FARC) has 2,500.
- January 17 – Scientists say the cocaine hippos in the Magdalena river basin are breeding voraciously and are an increasing menace so they must be culled.
- January 25
  - FARC changes its name to Comunes ("Commoners").
  - Notorious paramilitary commander, drug trafficker, and sexual abuser of young girls Hernán Giraldo Serna ("El Taladro") finishes his sentence in the United States and returns to Colombia.
- January 29 – 647 Haitian nationals, 23 Cubans, and 19 migrants from African countries are stranded on a beach in Necoclí, Antioquia Department, hoping to pass through the Darién Gap to Panama and, eventually, the United States.
- January 31 – Seven adults and seven children are killed and 16 people are missing after two boats collide near Tumaco, Nariño Department.

=== February ===
- February 8 – Cuba warns of an attack on Bogotá by the ELN in the "next few days." Mayor Claudia López Hernández and Defense Minister Diego Molano Vega say they take the threat seriously.

=== March ===
- March 3 – Ten former members of FARC are killed in a military bombing on Calamar, Guaviare. Three "dissidents" are captured.
- March 10 – A 26-year-old woman and her 4-year-old daughter are killed in a landslide in Siloé, Cali.
- March 27 – A car bomb explodes in Corinto, Cauca, injuring eleven. A later report indicates 43 were injured.
- March 30 – The government sets up a camp in Arauquita, Arauca, Arauca for 4,700 refugees from Apure, Venezuela.

=== April ===
- April 28 – The 2021 Colombian protests against tax increases begin.

=== September ===
- September 27 -– Gásper, a rescue dog at the Bogotá Fire Department's Puente Aranda station, goes missing during a search operation at Guadalupe Hill. His disappearance receives much local, national news coverage and sympathy from the public. He is found 2 days later on the 29th.

== Deaths ==
=== January ===
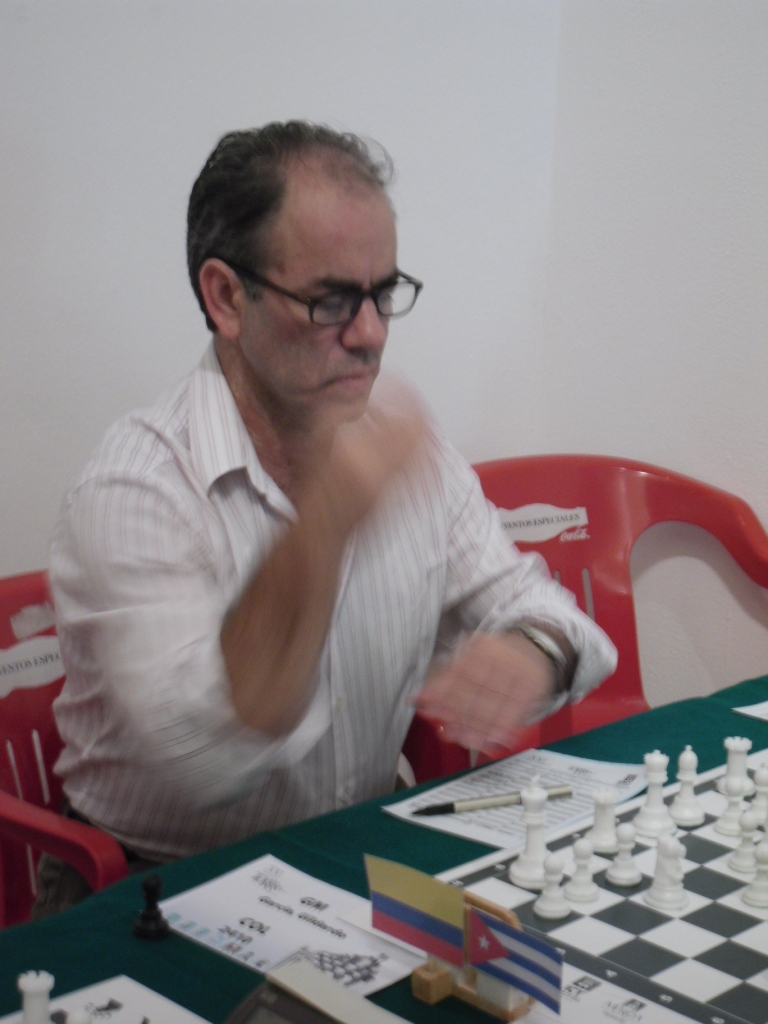
Gildardo García

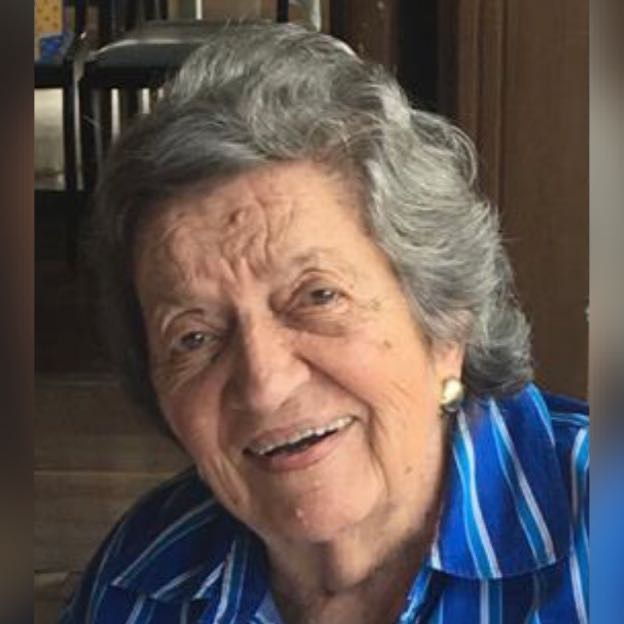
Mireya Arboleda

- 1 January – Pablo Hernández, racing cyclist (born 1940).
- 2 January – Laura Weinstein, transexual activist; respiratory complications.
- 11 January – Luis Adriano Piedrahita, 74, Roman Catholic bishop and theologian; COVID-19; (b. 1946)
- 12 January – Álvaro Mejía, long-distance runner (born 1940).
- 14 January – Antún Castro Urrutia, 74, musician and actor.
- 15 January – Gildardo García, chess player (born 1954).
- 21 January – Calixto Avena, 77, footballer; COVID-19.
- 26 January – Carlos Holmes Trujillo, 69, politician, Defense Minister; COVID-19.
- 27 January – Bertulfo Álvarez, 69, guerrilla fighter (Caribbean Bloc of the FARC-EP).

=== February ===
- 2 February
  - Héctor Epalza Quintero, 80, Bishop of Roman Catholic Diocese of Buenaventura (2004–2017).
  - Yordan Guetio, social activist in Corinto, Cauca; murdered.
- 17 February – Beder Guerra Gutiérrez, 67, journalist.
- 21 February – Mireya Arboleda, 92, classical pianist.
- 23 February – Herbin Hoyos, 53, journalist and broadcaster (Las voces del secuestro) who was in exile in Spain; COVID-19.
- February 25 – Juan Francisco Sarasti Jaramillo, 82, archbishop of Roman Catholic Archdiocese of Cali (2002–2011); COVID-19.
- 28 February – Jorge Oñate, 71, vallenato singer; complications from COVID-19.

=== March ===
- 2 March – Telma Barria Pinzón, diplomat (consul of Panama in Colombia); drowned
- 24 March – Pedro Saúl Morales, 61, racing cyclist; heart attack.
- 29 March – Antonio Caro, 71, conceptual artist; heart failure.

=== April ===
- 11 April – Guillermo Berrio, 53, footballer; cardiac arrest
- 13 April – Morgan Blanco, 85, accordionist and songwriter
- 14 April – Eduardo Enríquez Maya, 72, politician; COVID-19

=== May ===
- 1 May – José Daniel Falla Robles, 65, bishop; COVID-19
- 13 May – Pablo Uribe, 90, Olympic fencer
- 17 May – Jesús Santrich, 54, revolutionary; murdered
- 26 May – Arturo de Jesús Correa Toro, 80, bishop; COVID-19

=== November ===
- 22 November – Abelardo Carbonó, 73, musician and songwriter; COVID-19
- 26 November – Michi Sarmiento, 83, saxophonist and bandleader
