= 2020 in Colombia =

- Decades: 2000s; 2010s; 2020s
- See also: Other events of 2020; Timeline of Colombian history

Events in the year 2020 in Colombia.

== Incumbents ==
- President: Iván Duque Márquez
- Vice President: Marta Lucía Ramírez

== Events ==
- April 29
  - 500 Venezuela migrants living in Colombia block a highway in protest of the lockdown due to the COVID-19 pandemic in Colombia. They say the makes it impossible for them to work. There are 1.8 million Venezuelan migrants living in Colombia.
  - Two dozen Colombians deported from the United States have been found to have coronavirus.
- May 7 – Colombia legally exports marijuana seeds to Colorado, the United States.
- May 20 – COVID-19 pandemic in Colombia: Colombia reports a record of 752 new cases of the infection in one day, bringing the total to 17,787 with 630 deaths. Most of the cases are in Cartagena de Indias.
- May 24 – Two men on the radio program ‘Buenas Tardes con Fabio’ in Valledupar, Cesar Department joke about human trafficking and sexual slavery and may be prosecuted.
- May 27 – The United States Army sends a Security Force Assistance Brigade unit to Colombia to train anti-drug forces for a period of four months.
- June 4 – Indignation across social media due to the police beating to death of Anderson Arboleda, 21, for not wearing a facemask during the COVID-19 pandemic in Puerto Tejada, Cauca on May 19. His case is being compared to that of George Floyd in the United States.
- June 9 – A soldier, Ángel Zúñiga Galicia, removes his uniform and puts down his gun in refusal of an order to remove peasants from their home in Pance, Valle del Cauca Department.
- June 25 – Seven soldiers confess to raping a 12-year-old girl from the Embera Katio indigenous group, in the northwestern Risaralda Department.
- August 11 – COVID-19 pandemic: There are more than 400,000 confirmed cases and 13,500 deaths.
- August 14 – The bodies of four coal miners are found after a cave-in sevendays ago in Sogamoso, Boyacá Department.
- August 20 – Colombia requests the extradition of drug lord and paramilitary warlord Salvatore Mancuso, 56, on fears that he may be deported to Italy and released. Mancuso has been convicted over 1,000 murders and other crimes.
- August 21 – Two thousand indigenous Arhuaco protest against armed groups who are seizing land in the Sierra Nevada de Santa Marta.
- August 22 – Six young people are murdered in Tumaco, Nariño Department. This is the fourth massacre this week.
- August 24 – Three miners are rescued after being trapped for five days by a cave-in in Lenguazaque, Cundinamarca Department.
- August 25 – The Climate Green Fund of the United Nations donates US$28 million to prevent deforestation in the Amazon rainforest.
- August 30 – COVID-19 pandemic: The number of cases passes 600,000.
- September 4 – Opening of La Línea road tunnel.
- September 9 – Protests following the death of Javier Ordóñez, 42, at the hands of police leave seven dead and 140 injured in Bogota and Soacha.
- September 11 – Protests against police brutality leave ten dead, 209 civilians injured, 194 police injured, and 17 police kiosks burned in Bogotá, Medellín, Cali, and Manizales.
- September 16 – A statue of Spanish conquistador Sebastián de Belalcázar is torn down by indigenous Misak in Popayán, Cauca Department in protest of 500 years of slavery and oppression.
- November 15 – COVID-19 pandemic: Colombia reports 1,191,634 positive cases, ninth highest number in the world.
- December 15 – The United Nations Office of the Commissioner for Human Rights (OHCHR), reported it recorded the deaths of 255 people in 66 massacres in 2020, as well as the killing of 120 human rights defenders.
- 30 December – The government reports the manual elimination of 130,000 hectares (320,000 acres) of coca crops, the largest figure in a decade.

=== Culture ===
- January 7 – The telenovela Amar y vivir premiers on Colombian television.

== Deaths ==
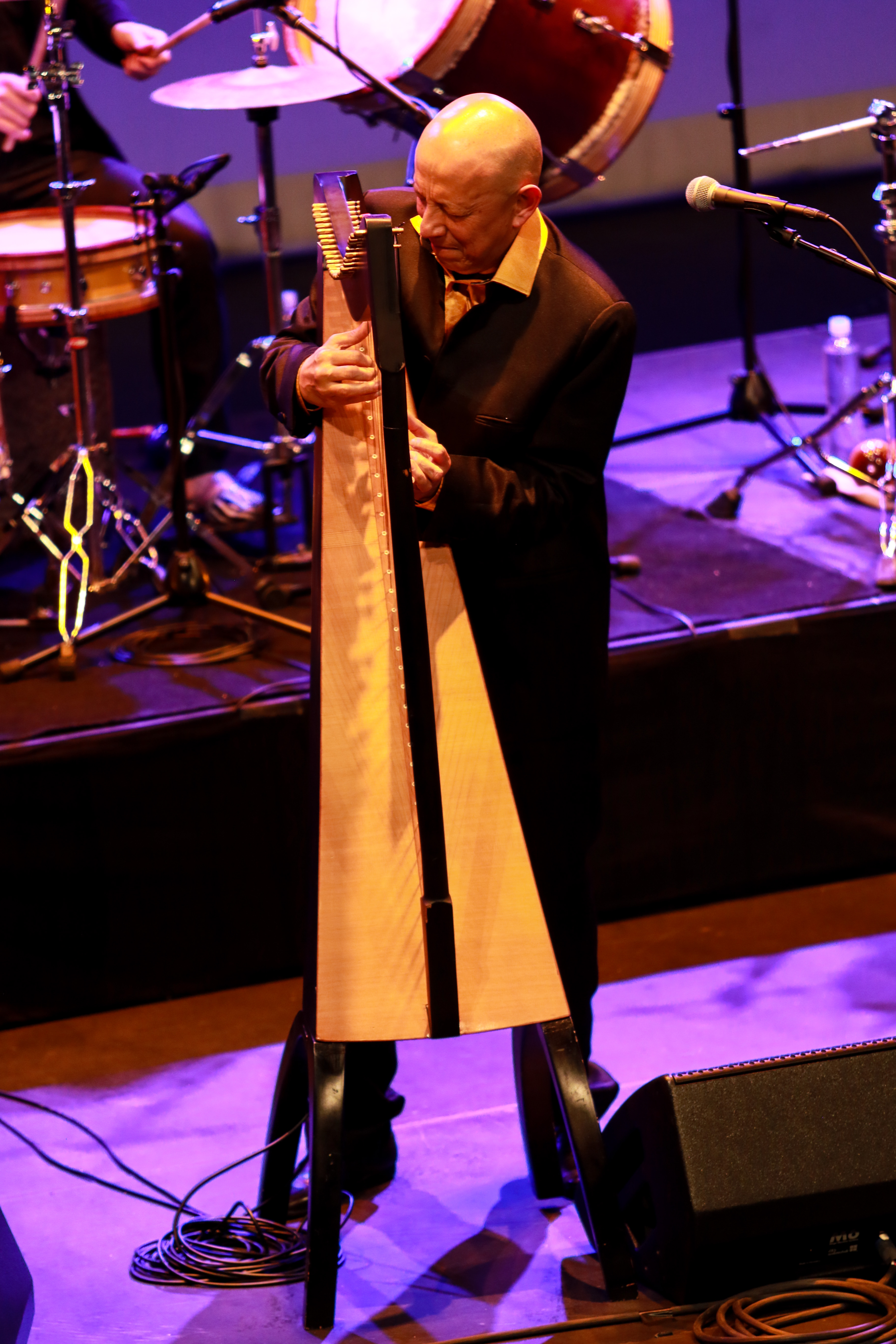
Carlos Cuco Rojas

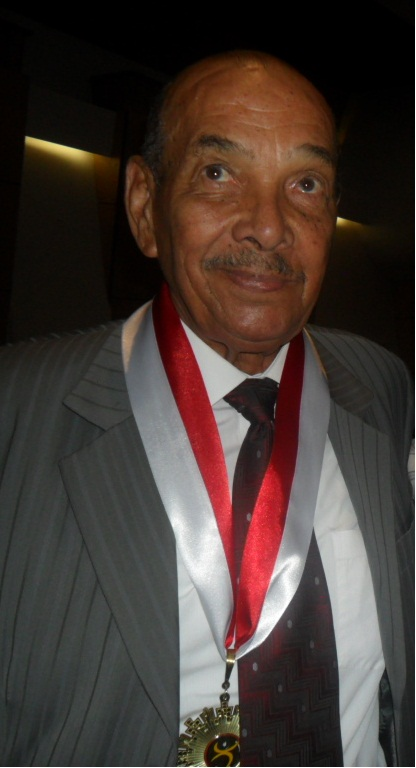
Efraín Sánchez

=== January to March ===
- 10 January – Carlos Cuco Rojas, harpist (b. 1954)
- 16 January – Efraín Sánchez, footballer (b, 1926)
- 6 February – Jhon Jairo Velásquez, 57, hitman, drug dealer and extortionist (Medellín Cartel); esophageal cancer
- 26 February 26 – Clementina Vélez, 73, doctor, academic and politician, MP (1990–1991, 1998–2002) and city councillor of Cali (1972–1986, 1992–1997, 2004–2019); heart attack
- 27 February – Juan Diego González, 39, soccer player (Once Caldas, La Equidad, Philadelphia Union) (body discovered on this date)

=== April to June ===
- 4 May – Álvaro Teherán, 54, basketball player (Baloncesto Málaga, Fort Wayne Fury, KK Olimpija); kidney failure

=== July to September ===
- 5 July – Alexander Balanta, 42, footballer; COVID-19.
- 24 July – El indio Rómulo, 89, poet; COVID-19.
- 15 August – Mercedes Barcha, 87, widow of writer Gabriel García Marquez, dies in Mexico City.
- 17 August – Massacre of Samaniego in Samaniego, Nariño
  - Brayan Cuaran
  - Bairón Patiño
  - Elian Benavides
  - Daniel Vargas
  - Laura Riascos
  - Joan Quintero
  - Rubén Ibarra
  - Óscar Obando
- 21 August – Antonio Bayter Abud, 86, Roman Catholic prelate, Vicar Apostolic of Inírida (1996–2013).
- 7 September – Aurelio Iragorri Hormaza, 83, politician, Senator (1991–2014), Governor of Cauca (1975–1976) and President of the Chamber of Representatives (1981–1982).
- 15 September – Rafael Uribe Ochoa, 59, actor (Punto y Raya, Cyrano Fernández).
- 17 September – Ricardo Ciciliano, 43, footballer (Deportes Tolima, Millonarios, Juan Aurich); pneumonia.
- 25 September – José María Ramos, 71, accordionist

=== October to December ===
- 16 October – Joaquín Pardo, 74, Olympic footballer (1968).
- 31 October – Horacio Serpa, 77, politician, Minister of Interior (1994–1997), Senator (1985–1988, 2014–2018) and Governor of Santander (2008–2012).
- 7 November – Roberto Reyes Toledo, 71, actor and stage and film director.
- 20 November – Romualdo Brito, 67, vallenato musician and composer; traffic collision.

== See also ==
- 2020 in the Caribbean
- 2020 in Central America
- COVID-19 pandemic in Colombia
- 2020 in politics and government
- 2020s
- 2020s in political history
- List of George Floyd protests outside the United States
