= Helena Benítez de Zapata =

Colombian songwriter, politician, teacher, and journalist

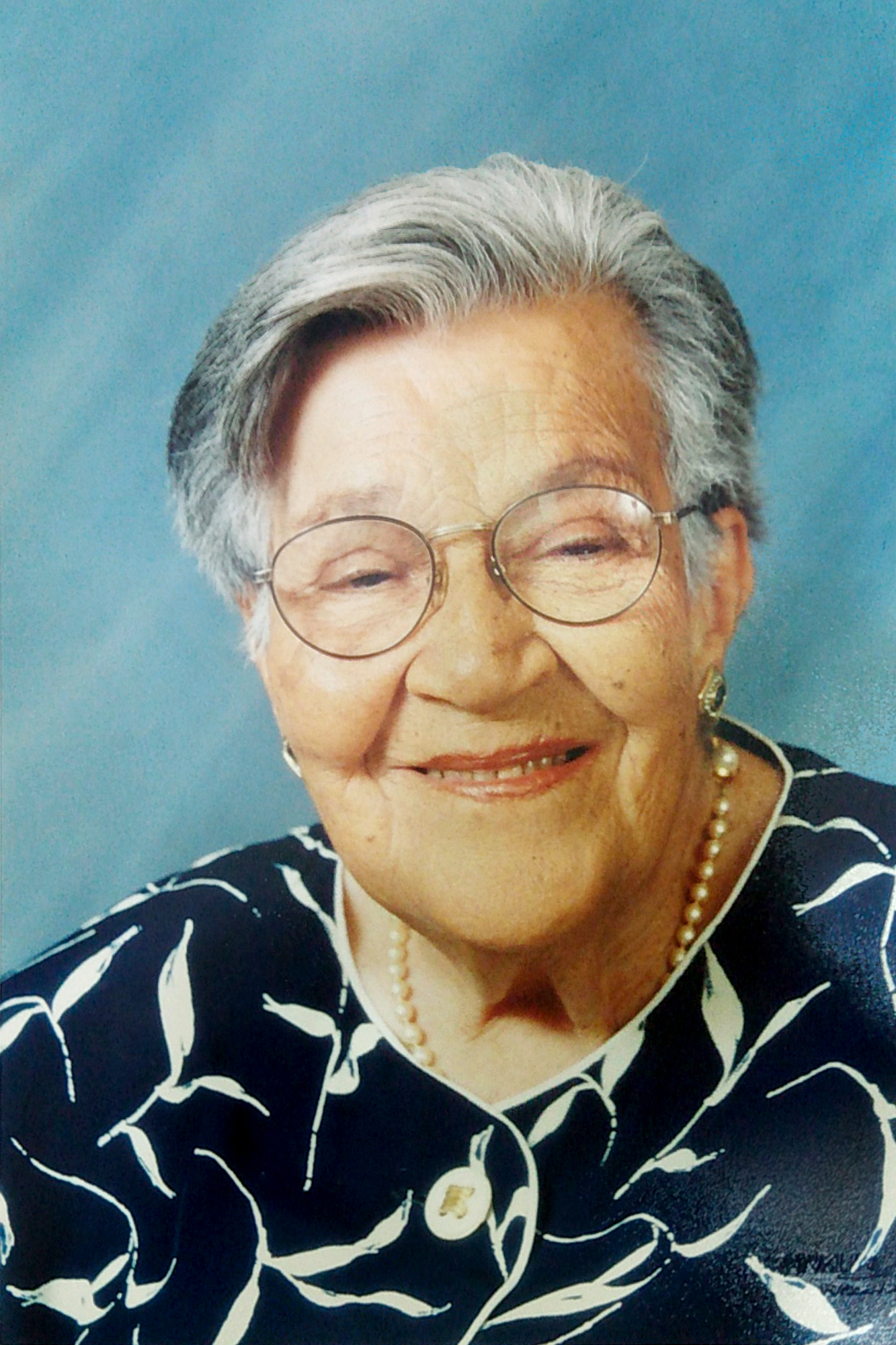
- Born: Helena Benítez Trejos; 26 June 1915; Riosucio, Colombia
- Died: 5 June 2009 (aged 93)
- Spouses: Jorge López Santacoloma (disappeared 1956); José Zapata Zapata
- Children: 5
- Musical career
- Labels: Codiscos, Victoria, Sonolux

Mayor of Riosucio
- In office April 1955 – May 1957

Helena Benítez Trejos de Zapata (1915–2009) was a Colombian songwriter, politician, teacher, and journalist. In 1955 Benítez became the first woman to be appointed mayor in Colombia, in her hometown of Riosucio. Many of her songs were recorded by Helenita Vargas, and her song "Feria de Cali" was made the official song of the Cali Fair in 1987.

== Biography ==
=== Early life ===
Benítez was born on 26 June 1915 in Riosucio, Caldas, to Manuel Benítez and Edelmira Trejos. Her father Manuel owned El Cordobés, a conservative newspaper in Riosucio.

=== Early career, first marriage, and mayorality ===
As a young woman Benítez spent three years living as a nun in a convent of the Vincentian Sisters of Charity in Riosucio. On leaving the convent she moved to Ansermanuevo, where she worked as a teacher and met her first husband Jorge López Santacoloma. Benítez moved with López to Manizales, where she again worked as a teacher and in 1948 started writing a column for the newspaper La Patria. She joined the choir of the conservatory Normal de Caldas, and taught herself piano and guitar.

Benítez used her platform in the press to advocate for women's suffrage in Colombia, which was achieved in 1954, and for promoting education. She was a member of a women's rights group alongside Josefina Valencia de Hubach and Esmeralda Arboleda.

In April 1955 Benítez was appointed mayor of Riosucio by brigadier Gustavo Sierra Ochoa, for which she is often called the first female mayor in Colombian history — although Juana de J. Sarmiento was acknowledged for the same reason when she served as interim mayor of Sabanalarga for five months in 1951. Benítez was mayor until a few days before Gustavo Rojas Pinilla lost power in May 1957.

=== Songwriting career and second marriage ===
In 1956 Benítez's husband Jorge disappeared while working in the Llanos Orientales, an area affected by guerrilla violence. This prompted Benítez to start writing songs. Benítez recorded for Colombian record labels Codiscos, Victoria and Sonolux. She performed in vocal groups with her children and with other members of her family. She wrote songs in a variety of styles that were recorded by several other artists, including Helenita Vargas and Claudia de Colombia.

Benítez remarried José Zapata Zapata and with him moved to Cali in 1958. Radio Nacional de Colombia wrote that there she "joins the written and radio media of the city, from which she continues to fight for education and women's rights, also leading demonstrations."

=== Personal life and death ===
Benítez had four children with her first husband Jorge López Santacoloma: Jorge Iván, Olga Victoria, Omar (who died young) and Alba Lucía. With her second husband José Zapata Zapata she had one daughter, Maria Elena.

She died on 5 June 2009, at the age of 93.

== Musical style, compositions, and other writing ==
Benítez's first record was an LP of Christmas carols called "Ecos Navideños", released on Codiscos. She also recorded records of carols for record labels Victoria and Sonolux.

Besides carols, Benítez wrote songs in a variety of other styles, including bolero, pasodoble, cumbia, and waltz. Many of her songs were recorded by Helenita Vargas, including "Vuelve Hacia Mí", "Mi Noche de Amor", "Esa Libreta", "Te Fuiste", "Mi Vida en Estaciones", "Simplemente", and the pasodoble "Feria de Cali". In 1987 "Feria de Cali" was made the official song of the Cali Fair, and Benítez was named "valued daughter of the city" (Spanish: hija dilecta de la ciudad). Other artists recorded songs by Benítez, including Isidora, Fausto, and Claudia de Colombia.

Besides songs, Benítez was a successful writer of prose. She wrote for newspapers La Patria, El País, Occidente, and El Pueblo, and also published three books: "Mi Vida en Estaciones", "Carmen, la Loca", and "Del Paraíso al Infierno".
