= 2017 in Colombia =

- Decades: 1990s; 2000s; 2010s; 2020s
- See also: Other events of 2017; Timeline of Colombian history

Events in the year 2017 in Colombia.

== Incumbents ==
- President: Juan Manuel Santos
- Vice President:
  - until 21 March: Germán Vargas Lleras
  - 21 March-29 March: vacant
  - starting 29 March: Oscar Naranjo

== Events ==
- 7 January – the Reinado Internacional del Café 2017, held in Manizales

== Deaths ==
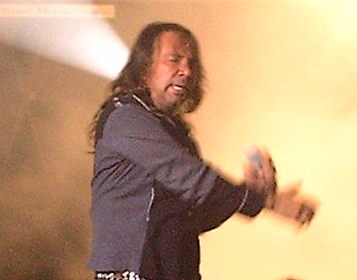
Elkin Ramírez

- 29 January – Elkin Ramírez, singer-songwriter (b. 1962).
- 15 March – Vicky, singer and songwriter (b. 1947)
- 5 June – Marcos Coll, footballer (b. 1935)
- 2 November – Efraín Mejía, musician and songwriter (b. 1934)
- 6 November – Jaime Llano González, musician and composer (b. 1932)
