= 2019 in Colombia =

- Decades: 1990s; 2000s; 2010s; 2020s
- See also: Other events of 2019; Timeline of Colombian history

Events of 2019 in Colombia.

== Incumbents ==
- President: Iván Duque Márquez
- Vice President: Marta Lucia Ramirez

== Events ==
=== January ===
- Blacks and Whites' Carnival
- January 17 - 2019 Bogotá car bombing: A vehicle-bound suicide bomb attack in Bogotá, Colombia, kills 22 people and injures 68 others, making it the deadliest attack on the Colombian capital since 2003.

=== February ===
- 2019 Tour Colombia
- 2019 shipping of humanitarian aid to Venezuela
- February 14 - The FECODE teachers union, Colombia's largest, stages a single day strike in protest of underfunding of and poor conditions in the public education system.

=== March ===
- Barranquilla's Carnival
- Cartagena Film Festival
- March 30 - A 14-year old "hit man" is arrested in Medellín after killing victims #11 and #12 in cold blood. The victims were businessman Darío Alexis, 42, and a messenger, Mateo C, 20.

=== July ===
- July 9 - A Laser Aéreo Douglas DC-3 plane carrying the mayor of Taraira and 13 others crashes near San Carlos de Guaroa, Colombia, killing all 14 people on board.
- July 28 – 22-year-old cyclist Egan Bernal wins the 2019 Tour de France.

=== August ===
- Some former FARC commanders re-arm and form Segunda Marquetalia (FARC-SM), abandoning the 2016 peace accord and becoming one of the largest FARC dissident groups.

=== September ===
- September 30 - Farmers Alberto Armando Sánchez, Fernando Salcedo, and Cristian Sánchez are killed in Tarazá, Antioquia. They were working under an illicit crop replacement program as a part of the 2016 Colombian peace agreement.

=== October ===
- October 11 - The joint headquarters for the Colombian Communist Party (PCC) and the Patriotic Union (UP) in Bogotá, under the Colombia Humana Coalition, is attacked with an explosive and gunfire. Soon after, the office of the People's Alternative Revolutionary Force (FARC) is vandalized. The same note is left at both the premises.
- October 27 - Regional and municipal elections are held, electing 32 department governors and 1,102 municipal mayors.

=== November ===
- November 6 - Defense Minister Guillermo Botero resigns right before a second motion to censure him was to be voted on. His resignation comes after a string of scandals including "false positive" extrajudicial killings and the bombing of FARC dissidents in Caquetá that killed 18 children.
- November 21 - Hundreds of thousands of Colombians across the country participate in a national strike to protest the Duque Márquez Administration, specifically inaction on the implementation of the 2016 peace accord and proposed pension cuts.
- November 23 - An 18-year-old protester, Dilan Cruz, is killed by riot police using 'non-lethal' ammunition in Bogotá, sparking outrage and further protest.

=== December ===
- December 4 - A third national strike against the Duque Márquez Administration takes place across Colombia.

== Deaths ==
=== January ===
- January 1 – María Teresa Uribe, sociologist and academic at the University of Antioquia (b. 1940).
- January 3 – Radamel García, Olympic footballer (b. 1957).
- January 8 – Julio Rubiano, Olympic racing cyclist (b. 1953).
- January 11 – Rafael Arcadio Bernal Supelano, Roman Catholic prelate, Bishop of Arauca and Líbano-Honda (b. 1934).
- January 29 – Fernando Gaitán, Screenwriter (Café, con aroma de mujer, Yo soy Betty, la fea) (b. 1960).
- January 30 – Jaime Ardila Casamitjana, writer (b. 1919).

=== February ===
- February 7 – Legarda, singer (b.1989).

=== May ===
- May 19 – Leidy Asprilla, footballer (b. 1997).

=== June ===
- June 6 – Jota Mario Valencia, television presenter (b. 1956).
- June 9 – Humberto Álvarez, footballer (b. 1929).

=== July ===
- July 2 – Jaime Posada Díaz, writer and politician: Minister of National Education and Governor of Cundinamarca Department (b. 1924)
- July 24 – Luis González, Olympic swimmer (b. 1925).

=== August ===
- August 13 – Cecilia Caballero Blanco, socialite and First Lady of Colombia (b. 1913).

=== September ===
- September 3 – José de Jesús Pimiento Rodríguez, Roman Catholic cardinal (b. 1919).

=== October ===
- October 20 – Gonzalo de Jesús Rivera Gómez, Roman Catholic prelate and Auxiliary Bishop of Medellín (b. 1933).

=== November ===
- November 19 – Ernesto Báez, United Self-Defense Forces of Colombia leader (b. 1955).

=== December ===
- December 10 – Fabio Vásquez Castaño, co-founder of the National Liberation Army (b. 1940).

== See also ==
- 2019 Pan American Games
