= Helenita Vargas =

Colombian singer

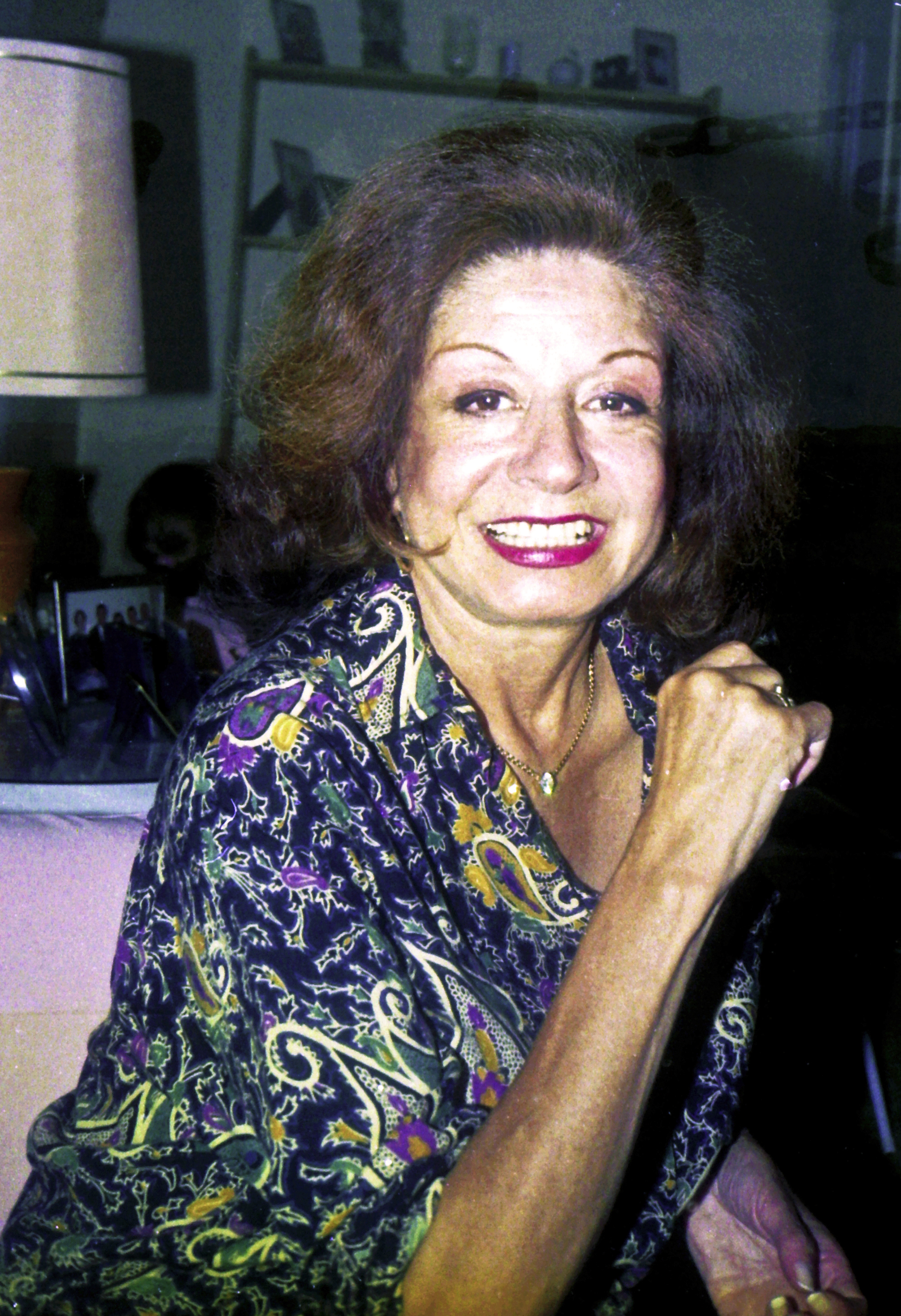
- Helenita Vargas in 1989

Background information
- Also known as: La Ronca de Oro
- Born: Sofía Helena Vargas Marulanda; 3 March 1934; Puerto Tejada, Colombia
- Died: 7 February 2011 (aged 76) Cali, Colombia
- Years active: 1967–2009
- Spouses: Hernán Isaías Ibarra (m. 1951); Gonzalo Zafra (m. 1964–1984)

Sofía Helena Vargas Marulanda (Note: In this Spanish name, the first or paternal surname is Vargas and the second or maternal family name is Marulanda.) (1934–2011), known as Helenita Vargas or La Ronca de Oro, was a Colombian singer. She recorded over 30 albums, and is known for her distinctive singing style that Jaime Andrés Monsalve described as "a husky voice that flows through our ears, minds, and hearts like velvet."

== Biography ==
Vargas was born on 3 March 1934 in Puerto Tejada, in the Colombian department of Cauca. Her parents were Eliécer Vargas and Susana Marulanda.

=== Music career ===
Vargas recorded for the first time in 1967 for record label Vergara. In 1968 at the age of 34 she signed a recording contract with Sonolux, and went on to release over 30 albums. Hernán Restrepo Duque was Vargas' musical director at Sonolux; he formed his own record label Preludio in 1975, and there released Vargas' album La Ronca de Oro, on which she was accompanied by Jaime Llano González and Tomás Burbano Ordóñez.

Vargas recorded songs in many Latin American styles, including ranchera, tango, pasillo, and bambuco. She had more than 50 gold records across her career. Notable hits for Vargas included "Búscame" and "Feria de Cali" (written by Helena Benítez de Zapata), "La Guerrillera" (Leonor Buenaventura de Valencia), "Señora" and "Mi Huella" (Graciela Arango de Tobón), "María de los Guardias" (Carlos Mejía Godoy, with lyrics rewritten by Alfonso López Michelsen), "Cuando Voy Por la Calle" (Jaime R. Echavarría), "Pasaste a la Historia", "No te Pido Más", and "Me Llaman la Ronca".

In 2009 Vargas recorded and released her final album, following a liver transplant. El Tiempo compared her singing to that of Esther Forero, Darío Gómez, and Diomedes Díaz, writing "They are not the ones with the most refined voice, nor the ones with the best intonation...But they have something in their expression and in their throat that manages to create feelings that people identify with."

=== Personal life and death ===
Vargas was married to Hernán Isaías Ibarra in 1951, and to Gonzalo Zafra from 1964 to 1984. Her nickname "La Ronca de Oro" was given to her by journalist José Pardo Llada, in an article in El Espacio.

She died on 7 February 2011 in Cali.
