= 2016 in Colombia =

- Decades: 1990s; 2000s; 2010s; 2020s
- See also: Other events of 2016; Timeline of Colombian history

Events in the year 2016 in Colombia.

== Incumbents ==
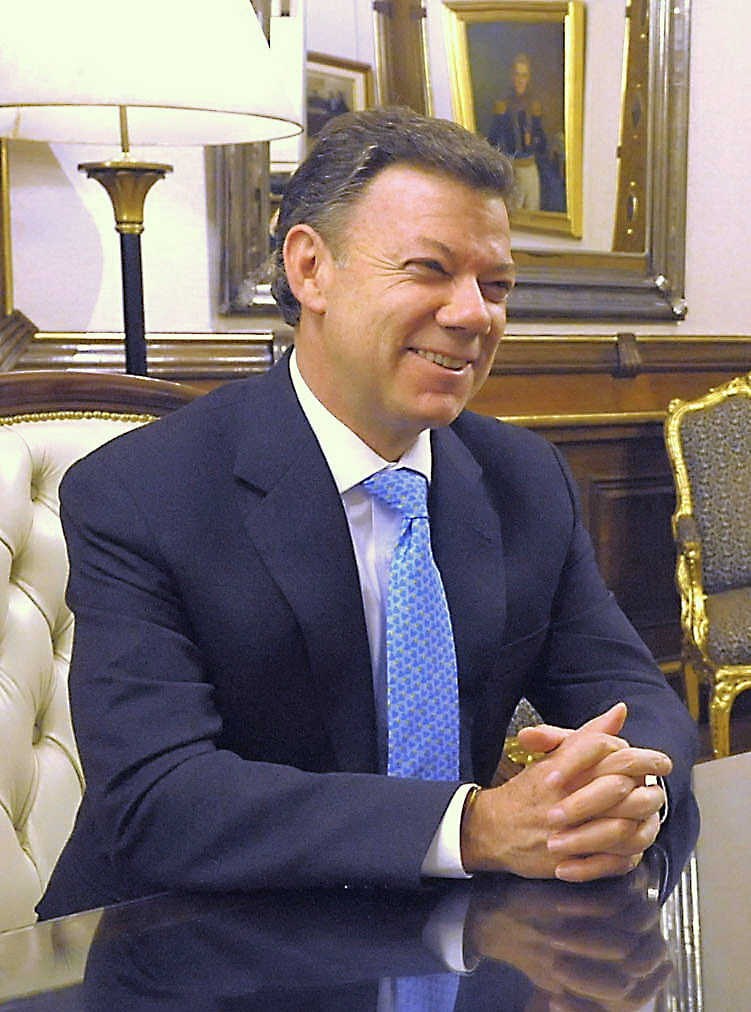
Juan Manuel Santos, President and Nobel Peace Prize laureate

- President: Juan Manuel Santos
- Vice President: Germán Vargas Lleras

== Events ==
=== Ongoing ===
- Colombian conflict
  - Colombian peace process

=== August ===
- 5-21 August – Colombia at the 2016 Summer Olympics: 147 athletes representing Colombia compete in 23 sports, winning three gold, two silver, and three bronze medals.

=== October ===
- 2 October – 2016 Colombian peace agreement referendum: a referendum aiming to ratify a final agreement on ending the conflict between the government and the Revolutionary Armed Forces of Colombia (FARC) fails, with 50.2% of votes against it and 49.8% in favor.
- 7 October – the 2016 Nobel Peace Prize is awarded to the President of Colombia Juan Manuel Santos.

=== November ===
- 28 November – LaMia Flight 2933: a charter flight from Santa Cruz de la Sierra, Bolivia to Medellín crashes into a mountain near La Unión, Antioquia. 71 people are killed, including members of the Brazilian football club Chapecoense.
- 30 November – Congress ratifies a revised peace accord with the FARC.

== Deaths ==
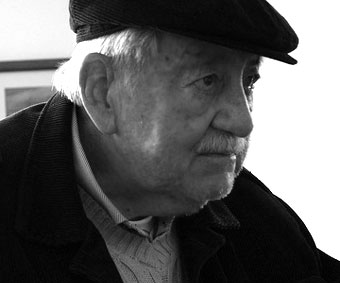
Fernando Soto Aparicio

- 16 February – Gregorio Garavito Jiménez, Roman Catholic bishop (b. 1919)
- 5 March – Eliseo Herrera, singer and songwriter (b. 1925)
- 22 March – Javier de Nicoló, salesian priest (b. 1928)
- 23 March – Gloria Galeano Garcés, botanist and agronomist (b. 1958)
- 31 March – Aníbal Alzate, footballer (b. 1933)
- 3 April – Phanor Arizabaleta-Arzayus, criminal (b. 1937).
- 11 April – Édgar Perea, politician and football commentator (b. 1934)
- 17 April – Luis Horacio Gomez González, Roman Catholic bishop (b. 1958)
- 2 May – Fernando Soto Aparicio, poet, storyteller, playwright, novelist, librettist, and screenwriter (b. 1933)
- 20 June – Julio Rojas Buendía, accordionist (b. 1958)
- 16 August – Jorge García Isaza, Roman Catholic bishop (b. 1928)
- 27 October – Nelson Pinedo, singer (b. 1928)
- 18 December – Gustavo Quintero, singer-songwriter (b. 1939)
