= 2014 in Colombia =

- Decades: 1990s; 2000s; 2010s; 2020s
- See also: Other events of 2014; Timeline of Colombian history

The following lists events that happened during 2014 in Colombia.

== Incumbents ==
- President: Juan Manuel Santos (2010 – 2018).
- Vice President:
  - Angelino Garzón (2010 – 7 August 2014).
  - Germán Vargas Lleras (7 August 2014 – 2017).

== Events ==
=== Ongoing ===
- Colombian conflict
  - Colombian peace process

=== March ===
- March–June – 2014 El Carmen de Bolívar illness outbreak: over 600 teenage girls and women in El Carmen de Bolívar, Bolívar Department developed medically unexplained symptoms, including fainting, twitching, and loss of consciousness. Media and residents suggested the symptoms resulted from HPV vaccines, but the event is concluded to be an instence of mass psychogenic illness by medical professionals and president Juan Manuel Santos.
- 9 March – 2014 Colombian parliamentary election: President Santos's coalition wins a reduced majority of seats in Congress, while former President Álvaro Uribe is elected to the Senate.

=== May ===
- 18 May – 2014 Fundación bus fire: A bus in Fundación, department of Magdalena, ignites while transporting children from a religious service, killing 31 children.
- 25 May – 2014 Colombian presidential election: the first round of the presidential election is held. Opposition candidate Óscar Iván Zuluaga of the Democratic Centre wins a plurality of votes; with no candidate winning a majority of the votes, the election goes to a second round.

=== June ===
- 15 June – 2014 Colombian presidential election: the second round of the presidential election is held, pitting incumbent Juan Manuel Santos against Óscar Iván Zuluaga. Santos is reelected with 51% of the vote.

=== August ===
- 7 August – Second inauguration of Juan Manuel Santos: Juan Manuel Santos is sworn in for a second term as the 32nd President of Colombia.

=== September ===
- 29 September–4 October – 2014 Claro Open Cali tennis tournament occurs in Cali, Valle del Cauca Department.

=== November ===
- 17 November – Miss Colombia 2014: the 62nd edition of the Miss Colombia pageant is held in Cartagena; Ariadna Gutiérrez of Sucre Department is crowned as the winner.
- 30 November – The Revolutionary Armed Forces of Colombia (FARC) releases Colombian Army general Rubén Alzate and two other prisoners they had recently captured.

== Deaths ==
- 18 September – Enrique Díaz, 69, accordionist and songwriter
- 13 December – Crescencio Camacho, 96, singer and songwriter
