= 2018 in Colombia =

- Decades: 1990s; 2000s; 2010s; 2020s
- See also: Other events of 2018; Timeline of Colombian history

Events of the year 2018 in Colombia.

== Incumbents ==
- President:
  - Juan Manuel Santos (until August 7)
  - Iván Duque (starting August 7)
- Vice President:
  - Oscar Naranjo (until August 7)
  - Marta Lucía Ramirez (starting August 7)

== Events ==
=== Ongoing ===
- Colombian conflict

=== February ===
- 9–25 February – Colombia at the 2018 Winter Olympics: Four athletes from Colombia compete at the 2018 Winter Olympics.

=== July ===
- 3 July – The Colombian national football team is knocked out of the 2018 FIFA World Cup in the second round, losing on penalties to England at the Otkritie Arena in Moscow, Russia.

=== October ===
- 6–18 October – Colombia competes at the 2018 Summer Youth Olympics.
- 11 October – A mudslide in the town of Marquetalia in Caldas Department results in at least 12 deaths.

== Deaths ==
- August 2 – Herbert King, 55, television and film actor (heart attack)
- August 11 – Nacho Paredes, 83, singer and songwriter
- December 20 – Adolfo Echeverría, 86, musician and songwriter
