= Herbin Hoyos =

Colombian journalist (1967–2021)

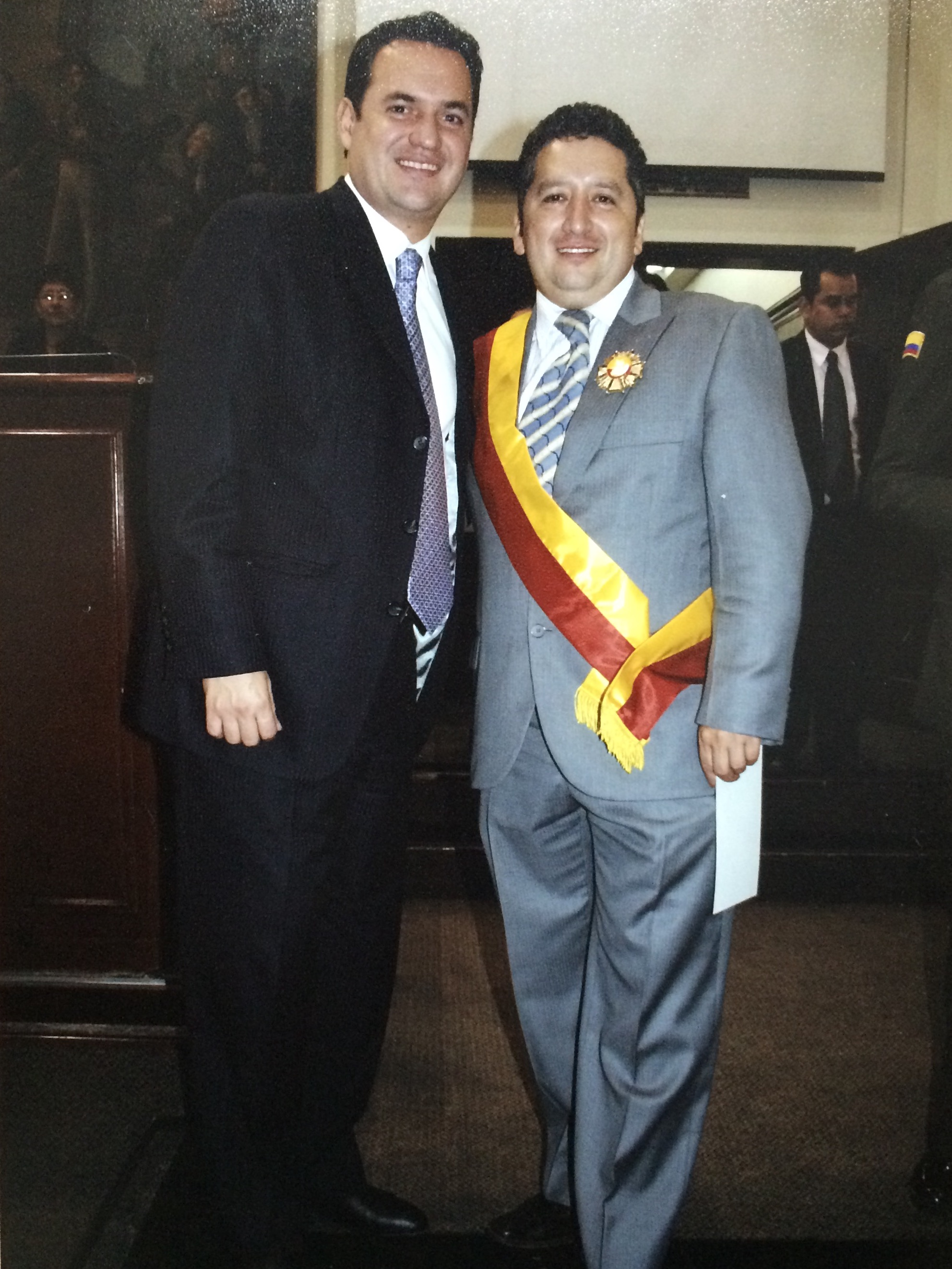
Hoyos

José Herbin Hoyos Medina (13 September 1967 – 23 February 2021) was a Colombian journalist and broadcaster who was in exile in Spain after receiving death threats from the Revolutionary Armed Forces of Colombia (FARC). He had a radio program called Las voces del secuestro (The voices of the kidnapped) which began in 1994. He was inspired by his own experience of being kidnapped by the FARC for 17 days. In 2008 he received the Premier Ondas (Wave Prize). Exiled in October 2009, he continued his program using the studios of Cadena SER.

== Education and career ==
Hoyos Medina was a journalist and war reporter in sixteen international conflicts: Iraq, Lebanon, Bosnia, Sarajevo, Belgrade, Kosovo, Rwanda, Angola, Sierra Leone, Chechnya, Afghanistan, Palestine - Gaza Strip, Syria and Libya. He studied at the Complutense University of Madrid and Television Production in Madrid IORTVE and he was awarded a scholarship by the Spanish Cooperation Agency.

He had a number of specializations: International Humanitarian Law, Sociology, Conflict Resolution and Negotiation with the United Nations (UN), "Counter-terrorism strategies" in Israel.

José Herbin Hoyos Medina also studied "Production of News and Documentary Television" with the Official Institute of Radio Spanish Television (IORTVE), Institute for Arab Israeli Conflict Studies and training for journalists on "Coverage of information in areas of conflict" issued in September 2002 in Israel; "Retraining for war reporters and Blue Helmets" of the UN issued in Campo de Mayo, Buenos Aires, Argentina October 2003.

He was trained in air, wáter, car and confined space rescue, first aid, survival tests, crisis and management rescue. He was a private pilot licensed by the Civil Aviation Authority from Colombia and an active founder member of Air Search and Rescue Organization: BAYR (Buqueda Aérea y rescate).

Herbin Hoyos was a lecturer on Defense of Human Rights in Conflict Areas and exponent of his experiences in war, studies and research at universities in Latin America, Europe and Colombia. He has denounced the violation of HR 1991 in Iraq during Operation Desert Storm and in 1998 during Desert Fox.

Herbin Hoyos was dedicated to humanitarian missions and presenting complaints to foreign media and international organizations about violations of human rights in Sarajevo, Bosnia and Herzegovina; Kosovo; Palestine; Sierra Leone; Belgrade; Iraq, and Chechnya, where he was tortured by the paramilitaries of Grozny. In September 2002 he interviewed President Yasser Arafat when covered the Al-Aqsa Intifada between Israel and Palestine.

In March 2003 he was the only Colombian journalist who accompanied the U.S. invasion of Iraq, broadcasting live on Caracol Radio and sixteen other radio and TV networks in Latin America.

Hoyos Medina created "Voices of Kidnapping" program on Caracol Radio after he was kidnapped by the FARC guerrillas March 12, 1994. He was rescued by the army 17 days later on March 29 after a thirteen-day battle. On the program "Voices of Kidnapping" he accompanied hostages through the radio, keeping them alive, allowing their families and loved ones speak to them through the radio program, which was unique in the world. Herbin Hoyos denounced human rights violations of over 24,000 victims kidnapped by the Farc, 6,500 by the National Liberation Army (ELN), and more than other 4,000 missing people in Colombia. Kidnapping survivors frequently thanked "Voices of Kidnapping" for keeping alive while in captivity.

His campaigns brought him closer to Uribismo, the conservative movement that opposed negotiations with the FAEC, created around former president Álvaro Uribe (2002-2010). While in exile he was a kind of spokesperson for the failed efforts to repeal the Special Jurisdiction of Peace (JEP), the agreements signed by the government of Juan Manuel Santos (2010-2018).

== Involvement in foreign exchange Ponzi scheme ==
In October 2008, Herbin Hoyos partnered with the Panamanian company FinanzasForex to open a fund to collect money for the kidnapping victims. The money as supposedly invested, with the proceeds going to kidnapping victims to help them attain financial security upon their release. The Commissions of Securities of Panama and Spain had already issued warnings that Finanzasforex was not licensed to take deposits nor to trade in financial markets. Finanzasforex eventually collapsed when the banks stopped accepting money transfers to its accounts under suspicion of illegal activities. In March 2011, its founder German Cardona Soler was detained in Spain under accusations of money laundering and of operating a Ponzi scheme that defrauded at least 100,000 people in Europe, the United States, and South America, including people who had contributed to the kidnapping fund.

== Exile and death ==
Hoyos went into self-exile in Spain after receiving death threats from insurgents, and he won a Premio Ondas the same year.

José Herbin Hoyos Medina died on 23 February 2021, aged 53, of respiratory difficulties related to COVID-19 in Bogotá during the COVID-19 pandemic in Colombia. The day before he died he tweeted, “Gracias a todos por sus oraciones, por su fe, por su solidaridad y su acompañamiento en esta nueva prueba de vida. Aquí sigo guerriando cada respiro. Cada toma de aire es una oportunidad más que apuntalo con sus oraciones, la fe en Dios y en los médicos. Sigan orando por favor.” (“Thank you all for your prayers, for your faith, for your solidarity and your accompaniment in this new test of life. Here I keep fighting every breath. Each air intake is one more opportunity to support it with your prayers, faith in God and in doctors. Please keep praying.”)

Colombian President Iván Duque Márquez tweeted, “Duele la muerte de nuestro amigo, el periodista Herbin Hoyos. Luchador incansable por la libertad y valiente denunciante de atrocidades del terrorismo” (“The death of our friend, the journalist Herbin Hoyos, hurts. A tireless fighter for freedom and a brave whistleblower of terrorism atrocities”). Former president Uribe tweeted, “Ha fallecido un campeón de la libertad, un protector inigualable de la ciudadanía martirizada por el narco terrorismo secuestrador” ("A champion of freedom has died, an unequaled protector of citizens martyred by the kidnapping narco terrorism").
