= Samaniego, Nariño =

Coordinates: 1°21′N 77°36′W

Samaniego
- Municipality and town
- Flag Coat of arms

- Location of the municipality and town of Samaniego, Nariño, in the Nariño Department of Colombia.
- Country: Colombia
- Department: Nariño Department

Population (2020 est.)
  - Total: 49,085
- Time zone: UTC-5 (Colombia Standard Time)

Samaniego (Spanish pronunciation: [samaˈnjeɣo]) is a town and municipality in the Nariño Department, Colombia.

Samaniego is known as the landscape's city and musical of Nariño. The majority of the city's population is dedicated to coffee and sugar cane to manufacture a handcrafted product named Panela, similar to sugar. Samaniego is known for having the principal youngest musical competition in Nariño, called the Departmental Competition of Musical Bands and Meeting of Dances in Nariño, where 20 musical bands have a competition to be the best band in Nariño and represent Nariño in other band competitions like in the Vega - Cundinamarca, San Pedro - Valle and Paipa - Boyaca.

Eight people were killed in the August 2020 Massacre of Samaniego. The victims are identified as Brayan Cuaran, Bairón Patiño, Elian Benavides, Daniel Vargas, Laura Riascos, Joan Quintero, Rubén Ibarra, and Óscar Obando.

== Climate ==
Climate data for Samaniego (Tanama), elevation 1,500 m (4,900 ft), (1981–2010)
Month	Jan	Feb	Mar	Apr	May	Jun	Jul	Aug	Sep	Oct	Nov	Dec	Year
Mean daily maximum °C (°F)	25.0 (77.0)	25.5 (77.9)	25.4 (77.7)	25.3 (77.5)	25.5 (77.9)	25.6 (78.1)	26.2 (79.2)	26.8 (80.2)	26.7 (80.1)	25.7 (78.3)	24.9 (76.8)	24.8 (76.6)	25.6 (78.1)
Daily mean °C (°F)	19.5 (67.1)	19.7 (67.5)	19.8 (67.6)	19.8 (67.6)	19.9 (67.8)	19.9 (67.8)	20.0 (68.0)	20.2 (68.4)	20.0 (68.0)	19.8 (67.6)	19.5 (67.1)	19.5 (67.1)	19.8 (67.6)
Mean daily minimum °C (°F)	14.5 (58.1)	14.4 (57.9)	14.5 (58.1)	14.8 (58.6)	14.9 (58.8)	14.4 (57.9)	13.7 (56.7)	13.7 (56.7)	13.9 (57.0)	14.6 (58.3)	14.8 (58.6)	14.8 (58.6)	14.4 (57.9)
Average precipitation mm (inches)	113.1 (4.45)	88.7 (3.49)	130.1 (5.12)	154.0 (6.06)	129.5 (5.10)	65.5 (2.58)	36.5 (1.44)	32.6 (1.28)	76.0 (2.99)	182.4 (7.18)	169.7 (6.68)	149.4 (5.88)	1,327.3 (52.26)
Average precipitation days	14	12	14	17	16	11	8	7	9	17	20	18	163
Average relative humidity (%)	82	82	82	82	82	80	76	74	76	81	83	83	80
Source: Instituto de Hidrologia Meteorologia y Estudios Ambientales
