= Martín Caballero =

Colombian guerrilla leader (1962–2007)

Gustavo Rueda Díaz (21 February 1962 – 24 October 2007), known by his nom de guerre Martín Caballero, was a Colombian guerrilla leader, member of the Revolutionary Armed Forces of Colombia (FARC) and commander of the 37th Front Caribbean Bloc of the FARC-EP that operates in the Caribbean Region. He was killed in action by the Colombian Army after a military operation on 25 October 2007. Colombian authorities wanted him on charges of rebellion, extortion, terrorism, first-degree murder, armed assault, assault and battery, and kidnapping, among others. Defense Minister Juan Manuel Santos described his death as the "most important" blow against FARC in 2007.

== Early years ==
In 1979 Gustavo Rueda Díaz studied in the northern Colombian port city of Barrancabermeja; during that year he became a militant in the Colombian Communist Youth (JUCO). Two years later in 1981, Rueda joined the 4th Front of the FARC-EP in the Middle Magdalena Region and assumed the alias of "Martín Caballero". He was later sent to the area of the Serranía del Perijá mountain range near the border with Venezuela. In 1991, he was appointed commander of the 37th Front of the FARC-EP, which he led until his death in 2007.

== Kidnapping of Fernando Araújo ==
Caballero was suspected of being the mastermind behind the kidnapping of the former Colombian minister of Foreign Affairs Fernando Araújo in the city of Cartagena in December 2000 and escaped in 2006.

== Attempted attack on President Bill Clinton ==
In 2000, President Bill Clinton visited Cartagena de las Indias in part to stand by Colombia in solidarity for its long war. Caballero was accused of planning to attack him in 2000 by placing explosives along the route of Clinton's presidential limousine.

== Kidnapping of three United States citizens ==
Martín Caballero was accused by Colombian authorities of being the man responsible for the majority of kidnappings in the northern Caribbean region of Colombia, including the three United States citizens Keith Stansell, Thomas Howes and Marc Gonsalves. Stansell, Thomas and Gonsalves were kidnapped when their Cessna Grand Caravan crashed while working for California Microwave Systems, which the U.S. Defense Department had contracted with to gather information about illicit coca and opium crops in Colombia. They were rescued in July 2008. For this case the Attorney General of Colombia formally accused Caballero on 5 October 2006 and ten other guerrilla leaders of being responsible for their kidnapping.

According to Colombian military intelligence, Caballero ordered the incursion of the 37th Front of the FARC-EP in the corregimiento of Matuya in the municipality of Maria La Baja, Bolívar Department, in which the insurgents assaulted a farm, threatened the workers, demanded a ransom and stole some 140 cattle. Under his orders, insurgents also attacked numerous farms with the same strategy while also extorting agricultural producers throughout the region.

== Death ==
The guerilla leader was killed in combat in October 2007, along with 17 other FARC guerrillas in Colombia.
