= Calixto Avena =

Colombian footballer (1943–2021)

Personal information
- Date of birth: 18 October 1943
- Date of death: 21 January 2021 (aged 77)
- Place of death: Santa Cruz de Lorica, Colombia
- Position: Goalkeeper

Senior career*
Years	Team	Apps	(Gls)
1963–1964	Millonarios		
1965–1970	Junior		

International career
- Colombia
- * Club domestic league appearances and goals

Calixto Avena (18 October 1943 – 21 January 2021) was a Colombian footballer who played as a goalkeeper.

== Career ==
Avena played professionally for Millonarios and Junior between 1963 and 1970.

Avena also represented the Colombia national team in qualifying matches for the 1966 FIFA World Cup.

He died from COVID-19 in Santa Cruz de Lorica, on 21 January 2021, aged 77, during the COVID-19 pandemic in Colombia.
