= 2015 in Colombia =

- Decades: 1990s; 2000s; 2010s; 2020s
- See also: Other events of 2015; Timeline of Colombian history

Events of 2015 in Colombia.

== Incumbents ==
- President: Juan Manuel Santos
- Vice President: Germán Vargas Lleras

== Events ==
=== January ===
- 10 January – Reinado Internacional del Café 2015.
- 25 January – Miss Colombia 2013 Paulina Vega is crowned Miss Universe 2014.

=== February ===
- 22 February – The 2015 Pan American Cross Country Cup is held in Barranquilla.

=== March ===
- 10 March – 2015 Santander earthquake.

=== April ===
- 12 April – The Attorney General announces that there are 22 open investigations against Army generals concerning false positive killings during an event honoring its victims.

=== May ===
- 18 May – 2015 Colombian landslide.

=== June ===
- 18-22 June – The 2015 South American Artistic Gymnastics Championships are held in Cali.

=== July ===
- 15-19 July – The 2015 World Youth Championships in Athletics are held in Cali.

=== August ===
- 2-15 August – 2015 Vuelta a Colombia.
- 4 August – 2015 Colombia helicopter crash.
- 19 August – 2015 Colombia–Venezuela migrant crisis: 3 Venezuelan soldiers are injured from gunfire on the border with Venezuela.
- 20 August – 2015 Colombia–Venezuela migrant crisis: Venezuelan President Nicholas Maduro declares a state of emergency.

=== September ===
- 12 September– 2015 Colombia–Venezuela migrant crisis: Both Colombia and Venezuela send moving troops and armored vehicles to their shared border.

=== October ===
- 25 October – 2015 Colombian regional and municipal elections

=== November ===
- 16 November – Miss Colombia 2015.

=== December ===
- 22 December – Medical marijuana is legalized.

== Deaths ==
- 18 November – Calixto Ochoa, 81, accordionist and songwriter
