= Jaime R. Echavarría =

Colombian musician, singer, songwriter, politician, and chemical engineer

- Born: Jaime Rudecindo Echavarría Villegas; 13 November 1923; Medellín, Colombia
- Died: 29 January 2010 (aged 86) Medellín, Colombia

Governor of Antioquia
- In office 1974–1975

Colombia Ambassador to Ethiopia
- In office 1967–1967

Jaime Rudecindo Echavarría Villegas (Note: In this Spanish name, the first or paternal surname is Echavarría and the second or maternal family name is Villegas.) (13 November 1923 – 29 January 2010), known as Jaime R. Echavarría, was a Colombian musician, singer, songwriter, politician, and chemical engineer. In his book Lo Que Cuentan los Boleros, Hernán Restrepo Duque described Echavarría as "one of the most important, beloved, and respected composers in Colombia".

== Biography ==
Echavarría was born on 13 November 1923 in Medellín, in the Colombian department of Antioquia. His parents were Jaime Echavarría and Alicia Villegas. His mother was a pianist, and his uncle Luis Eduardo taught him to play tiple and accordion. Echavarría went to school at the Colegio San Ignacio in Medellín, and got a bachelor's degree in chemical engineering from the Pontifical Bolivarian University.

Echavarría was a self-taught musician, and never formally studied music. His first album was Yo Nací Para Ti (1963), on which he played his compositions on the piano and sang, accompanied by Luis Uribe Bueno on guitar and Iván Uribe Vélez on double bass.

He was the ambassador extraordinary of Colombia to UNCTAD in 1964, its inaugural year. In 1967 he was the ambassador of Colombia to Ethiopia, and in 1974–1975 he was the Governor of Antioquia.

From 1982 to 1986 Echavarría was the president of Acinpro (the Colombian Association of Performers and Producers), and was later made director.

=== Personal life and death ===
Echavarría was married to Rosa Elena López. He died of kidney failure on 29 January 2010 in Medellín.

== Musical style and notable compositions ==
Echavarría is particularly celebrated as a composer of boleros; Radio Nacional de Colombia called him "undoubtedly the most important personality of the Colombian bolero". He also wrote bambucos and pasillos, and in total wrote over 100 songs.

Echavarría's notable compositions include:

- bambuco: "Noches de Cartagena", "Muchacha de Mis Amores", "Serenata", "Yo Nací Para Tí"
- bolero: "La Flor de las Flores", "Entre Estas Cuatro Paredes", "Me Estás Haciendo Falta", "Aquel Ayer", "Vamos a Ver", "Dime Por Qué", "Traicionera"
- pasillo: "Mi Guitarra te Añora", "Amor", "Sueño Tal Vez", and "Qué Tienes Tú"
- waltz: "Cuando Voy Por la Calle"

His songs have been recorded by María Dolores Pradera, René Cabel, Helenita Vargas, Armando Manzanero, Matilde Díaz, Leonor González Mina, Patricia González, María Martha Serra Lima, Beatriz Márquez, Sofronín Martínez, Alfonso Ortiz Tirado, and Gerardo Arellano.
