= Vicky (singer) =

Colombian singer and songwriter

- Born: Esperanza Acevedo Ossa; 11 November 1947; Ansermanuevo, Colombia
- Died: 15 March 2017 (aged 69) Bogotá, Colombia

Esperanza Acevedo Ossa (Note: In this Spanish name, the first or paternal surname is Acevedo and the second or maternal family name is Ossa.) (1947 – 2017), known by the stage name Vicky, was a Colombian singer and songwriter. She became known through her performances on El Club del Clan, and was a part of the Colombian nueva ola in the 1960s and 70s.

== Biography ==
Vicky was born on 11 November 1947 in Ansermanuevo, in the Colombian department of Valle del Cauca. Her parents were Sáulo Acevedo Arboleda and Graciela Ossa. She attended school in Palmira and Bogotá, and from 1963 worked at a bank for two years.

In 1965, Vicky made her first appearance on El Club del Clan (then called Campeones), singing "Tú Eres Mi Baby". For the performance she was mistakenly introduced by Guillermo Hinestroza as "Vicky", and the name stuck. Vicky stayed at El Club del Clan for over a year before leaving to pursue a solo career. Her debut album Llorando Estoy was released on Sonolux in 1967, and most of the tracks were written by her. Later in 1967 she released the album Vicky on Codiscos.

Vicky then left Colombia and lived with her aunt in Caracas for five years, to escape harassment due to rumours that she was a man. She returned in 1972 at the request of Alfonso Lizarazo, and her third album Esa niña was released in August 1973. Vicky went on to release several other albums on record labels Discos Orbe, Fonoson, and Discos Fuentes. In 2014, she published her autobiography, Canto de Gorrión.

Vicky died of lung cancer on 15 March 2017 in Bogotá.

== Musical style and compositions ==
Vicky was a part of the Colombian nueva ola (Spanish for "new wave"), alongside artists like Óscar Golden, Claudia de Colombia, Fernando Calle, and Billy Pontoni. She wrote over 100 songs, notably "Pobre Gorrión".
