= Javier de Nicoló =

Javier De Nicoló
- Saverio De Nicoló
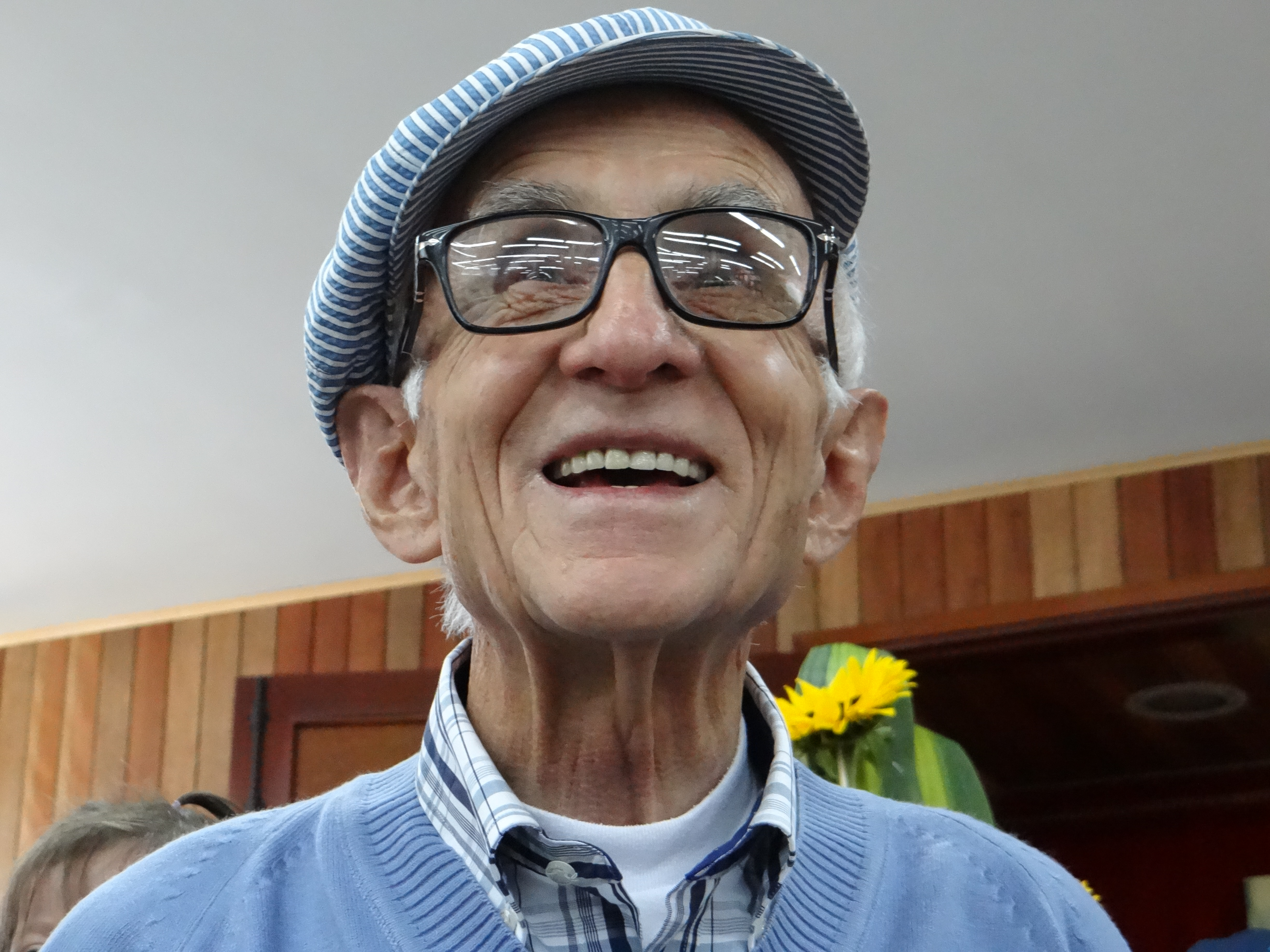

Personal life
- Born: 29 April 1928 Bari, Italy
- Died: 22 March 2016 (aged 87) Bogotá, Colombia

Religious life
- Religion: Roman Catholic
- Institute: Salesians of Don Bosco
- Profession: Salesian priest

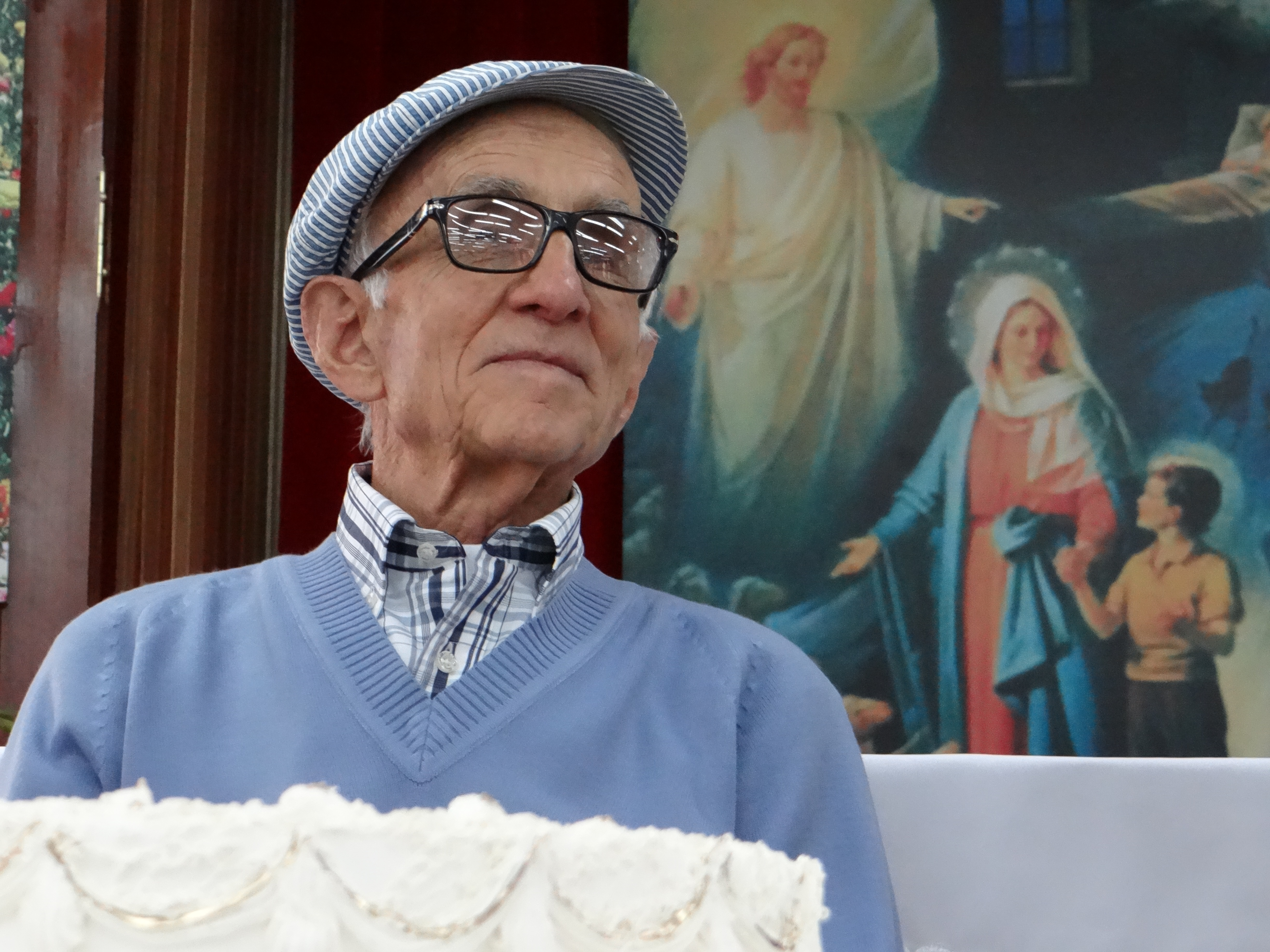
Javier de Nicoló in 2013

Javier De Nicoló (29 April 1928 – 22 March 2016), or Saverio (Javier) De Nicolò, was an Italian-born Colombian salesian priest who developed a program that has offered more than 40,000 young people the education and moral support they needed to become productive citizens. Father Javier De Nicoló received countless distinctions. UNICEF was one of those who paid tribute to the father Javier De Nicoló. De Nicoló was awarded La Orden De Boyacá (Colombia's highest government honor).

== Life ==
Javier de Nicoló was born in Bari, Italy in 1928, the youngest of six children in the family of de Nicolò Lattanzi. His father was wounded three times in World War I and died when Javier was still a child. During World War II, Javier pursued his vocational training in a slaughter- house, after bombing raids destroyed his high school. In October 1949, as a seminarian, Javier de Nicoló landed at Buenaventura, Colombia a year after the bogotazo. Javier de Nicoló was ordained priest on 28 October 1958.

Javier de Nicoló spent his life in the planning and implementation of projects for the rehabilitation and education of thousands of street children, especially in the cities of Bogotá, Bucaramanga and Barranquilla. He had a determination to live up to his resolution: "the best experience in the world is to serve humanity."

UNICEF published the book "Street children", about his work and life, which were honored in Washington, on October 25, 2001. Javier received the award "Ivy Humanitarian Prize ' a lifetime of humanitarian achievements", created to strengthen and differentiate those who have made great contributions to the well-being of children. Father Javier de Nicoló received countless distinctions such as the recognition made by the UNICEF and the award "Order of the Star of Italian Solidarity" by the Government of Italy.

De Nicoló directed both the government's Instituto Distrital para la Protección de la Niñez y la Juventud (IDIPRON) and the nongovernmental organization he had founded, Fundación Servicio de Orientación Juvenil (FSJ). IDIPRON helps children rescued from the streets.

Javier de Nicoló died in Bogotá on 22 March 2016.

== See also ==
- Salesians of Don Bosco
