= Bertulfo Álvarez =

Colombian militant (1951–2021)

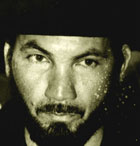
- Bettulfo Álvarez Portrait
- Born: 1951; Ermilo Cabrera Díaz
- Died: 27 January 2021 (aged 69–70)
- Occupation: guerrilla fighter

Bertulfo Álvarez (born Ermilo Cabrera Díaz; 1951 – 27 January 2021) was a Colombian guerrilla fighter and member of the FARC-EP. He was the chief of the Caribbean Bloc of the FARC-EP and was mentioned as a possible new member in the FARC's seven-member secretariat after the death of Alfonso Cano. He was also a member of FARC's Higher Command, which is composed of some 60 members.
