= Hernán Giraldo =

Colombian paramilitary leader

- Born: 16 August 1948 (age 78); Pácora, Caldas, Colombia
- Organization: United Self-Defense Forces of Colombia

Hernán Giraldo Serna (born 16 August 1948), also known as the "Lord of the Sierra", is the leader of the Colombian paramilitary organization Tayrona Resistance Block, a 1,166-member armed group that is part of the United Self-Defense Forces of Colombia. Colombian prosecutors have described Giraldo as "one of the richest narco-paramilitaries". In the Justice and Peace process, he accepted responsibility for 35 acts of gender-based violence, some committed by his subordinates—including the rape of 11 girls. A Colombian court sentenced him to 20 years in prison for his role in the massacre of 20 workers.

His son, Cristhian Giovanni Giraldo Cadavid, born in Colombia and raised in Brooklyn, New York City, was captured in 2017 while living in Madrid, Spain, with family members and over $28 million. Colombian authorities considered him to be one of the up-and-coming biggest drug lords in Colombia if he were to take control after his father. He is also suspected of the murders of two narcotics agents, the killings of Kankuamo people as part of his war against leftist guerrilla groups, and the abduction of Colombian senator José Gnecco.

On February 2, 2006, he signed a peace deal with the Colombian government and demobilized his armed faction. He is expected to serve a prison sentence of 5 to 8 years if he complies with the terms of the agreement. There are also outstanding warrants for his arrest in the United States for his role in the cocaine trade, but it is expected that part of his peace deal includes an implicit no-extradition pledge, as long as he does not violate any of the agreement's terms. Hernán is one of the 14 criminals who have been extradited to the United States. According to the U.S. DEA website, Hernán "pleaded guilty in 2009 to one count of conspiracy to distribute cocaine knowing and intending that it would be imported into the United States." However, the website indicates he was not sentenced until Friday, March 3, 2017. He was sentenced to "198 months" (16.5 years) in prison. He was released from U.S. federal prison on January 4, 2021. The Colombian government immediately called for his extradition back to Colombia to face outstanding charges related to his time as a paramilitary leader. He was arrested on his arrival back in Colombia, facing charges related to massacres, murder, kidnapping, rape, and drug trafficking.

The Tayrona Resistance Block was demobilized in February 2006, but some of its members, including some of Giraldo's relatives, continued to commit crimes. A group called El Taladro ("the drill"), which includes some of Giraldo's relatives, continued to commit crimes. Some of Giraldo's victims fear he will regain control of the Sierra Nevada de Santa Marta now that he is back in Colombia.

In July 2026, Hernán Giraldo was also sentenced to 21 years in prison for abusing three girls aged 11 and 12, forcing them to live on the farms where he resided, and requiring them to visit him every week in the various prisons where he was held before being extradited to the United States.
