= El Espacio =

Colombian newspaper

- Type: Daily newspaper
- Format: Online newspaper
- Founder: Jaime Ardila Casamitjana
- Editor-in-chief: Andrés Castañeda
- Founded: 22 August 1965; 60 years ago
- Language: Spanish
- Headquarters: Bogotá, D.C., Colombia
- Website: www.elespacio.co

El Espacio (meaning "The Space") is a Colombian newspaper from Bogotá.

== History and profile ==
El Espacio was founded in 1965 by Ciro Gomez Mejia. The paper is headquartered in Bogota. Due to financial difficulties, technological changes in recent decades, strong competition from free newspapers and lower prices, the newspaper was last circulated on 23 November 2013. However, since August 2014, an online version is available on El Espacio's official website.
