= Adolfo Echeverría =

Colombian musician and songwriter

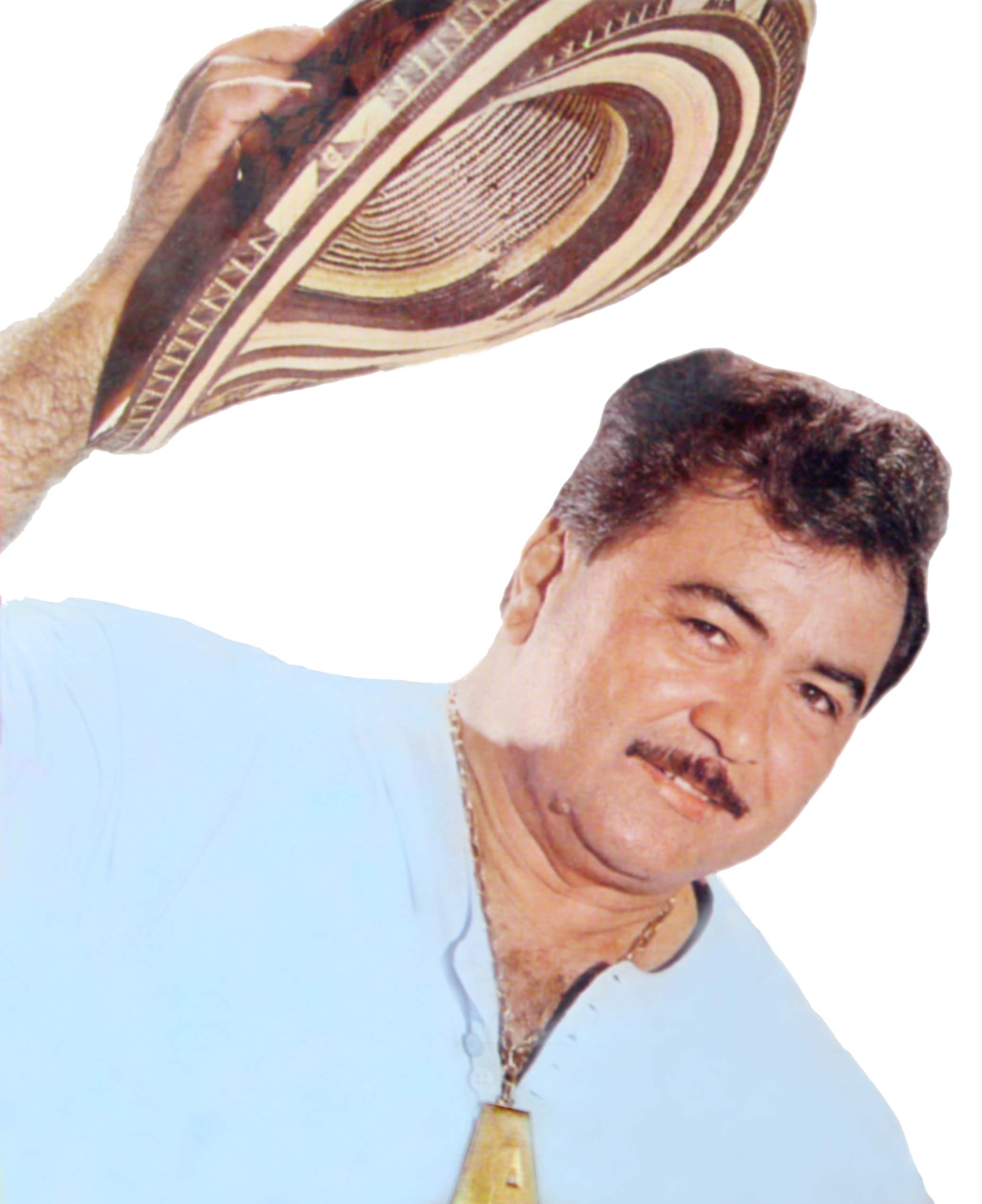
- Echeverría in an undated image

Background information
- Born: Adolfo Ernesto Echeverría Comas; 3 September 1932; Barranquilla, Colombia
- Died: 20 December 2018 (aged 86) Barranquilla, Colombia
- Spouse: Anastasia Arrieta

Adolfo Ernesto Echeverría Comas (1932–2018) was a Colombian musician and songwriter. He is particularly known for his songs "Las Cuatro Fiestas", which is played in the Colombian Caribbean on the Día de las Velitas, and "Amaneciendo".

== Biography ==
Echeverría was born on 3 September 1932 in the San Roque neighbourhood of Barranquilla, capital of the Colombian department of Atlántico.

Echeverría had a job as a clothes salesman in Barranquilla, and in his free time wrote songs and sang on the Emisoras Unidas radio station. In September 1961, he left his job to pursue a career in music. Echeverría's first hit was a 1965 recording of his song "Las Cuatro Fiestas" by the Cuarteto del Mónaco, with Nury Borrás on vocals and Álex "el Muñecón" Acosta on clarinet. In the Colombian Caribbean, the song is played on the Día de las Velitas.

In 1972 Echeverría's brother Gil Blas, who had just joined Billo's Caracas Boys, was killed in a road accident, and Echeverría took a break from making music. He later formed the group Los Mayorales, with whom he recorded for record labels Sonolux, Discos Fuentes, and Felito.

In later life Echeverría had diabetes and Alzheimer's. He died on 20 December 2018 in Barranquilla, after spending most of the month in hospital.

== Notable compositions ==
In 1960 Echeverría wrote "Las Cuatro Fiestas", and he recorded it himself in 1961. The "four festivals" referred to in the song are the Día de las Velitas, Christmas, New Year, and Carnival.

Echeverría is reported as having written around 2800 songs. His other notable compositions include "Amaneciendo", "La Inmaculada", "La Gota Gorda", "El Hombre del Sobrerito", "La Ninfa Morena", "La Rebelde", "Prejuicios", "Para Santa Marta", "La Paloma", "La Subienda del Pescao", "La Tormenta", and "Gloria Peña". Gustavo Quintero's band Los Graduados recorded several of Echeverría's compositions, including "Los Gansos" and "Fantasía Octurna". Tito Puente and Celia Cruz recorded Echeverría's song "Salsa de Tomate" in 1970.
