= 2014 El Carmen de Bolívar illness outbreak =

Illness outbreak in Colombian municipality

Beginning in March 2014 and increasing substantially in May and June 2014, over 600 teenage girls and women in El Carmen de Bolívar, Colombia developed medically unexplained symptoms, including fainting, twitching, and loss of consciousness. Media and residents suggested the symptoms resulted from HPV vaccines, although health officials found no link between the vaccine and the symptoms. The event has been labeled as an example of mass psychogenic illness by medical professionals and by then-Colombian president Juan Manuel Santos.

== Progression of events ==
The first girl in El Carmen de Bolívar to develop symptoms did so in late March 2014.

Between 29 May and 2 June, 15 female students from Colegio Espíritu Santo were admitted to the local Nuestra Senora del Carmen hospital after developing "tachycardia, shortness of breath, and numbness of the limbs". Health officials considered "possible food, water, lead, or pesticide poisoning" as causes, while several of the girls' parents linked the symptoms to the Gardasil vaccine; the girls had received the second dose of the vaccine in school two months prior. Several of the girls were sent to hospitals in Sincelejo and Barranquilla, after continuing to show symptoms following their discharge. The school had not notified parents of the school vaccination campaign, a fact which was later criticized by the media.

Videos and images of the original 15 girls spread on social media. In the following weeks after 2 June, "over 600 cases" of girls developing similar symptoms following HPV vaccination were reported across the country. Cases tended to peak with increased media coverage of the events, and "no cases were reported during the weekends and holiday periods". Nuestra Señora del Carmen hospital in El Carmen de Bolívar was "overwhelmed" by the number of girls brought to the hospital. Hospital staff provided affected people with oxygen and saline solution, and taught them breathing techniques. Some girls were also transferred to hospitals in Bogotá, where at least two were diagnosed with lead poisoning.

Girls in El Carmen de Bolívar continued to experience symptoms as of May 2016. Twenty of the affected girls had attempted suicide; one was successful.

== Investigations and responses ==
The Colombian National Institute of Health undertook a "thorough epidemiologic investigation" of 517 of the affected girls, and found "no organic association between adverse reactions and the HPV vaccination". American physician Iván Mendoza, the medical director of electrophysiology at Jackson Memorial Hospital in Miami, United States, came to the same conclusion in an independent report, attributing the symptoms to psychogenic illness.

Many parents and relatives of affected girls did not accept the reports of the investigations. In August 2014, residents of El Carmen de Bolívar marched to demand the government thoroughly investigate the cases.

In January 2015, the Colombian government released an official report saying the girls' symptoms were due to psychological causes.

== Impact ==
The event severely impacted the Colombian public's confidence in the HPV vaccine. In 2012, 98% of eligible girls in the country had received the first dose of the vaccine, and 88% had received all three; by 2016, 14% of girls had received one dose, and 5% all three.
