= Clementina Vélez =

Colombian doctor and politician (1946–2020)

- Born: 9 May 1946
- Died: 26 February 2020 (aged 73)
- Occupations: Doctor, academic and politician

Maria Clementina Vélez Galvez (9 May 1946 – 26 February 2020) was a Colombian doctor, academic and politician, who served as an MP and city councillor of Cali as a member of the Colombian Liberal Party.
