= Jaime Ardila Casamitjana =

Colombian writer (1919–2019)

Jaime Ardila Casamitjana (12 January 1919 – 30 January 2019) was a Colombian writer. He was born in Zapatoca, and graduated from the Colegio de San Pedro Claver in 1936, going on to a journalistic career. He was known for his novels Babel (1945) and Las manzanas del paraiso (1960). In 1965, he founded the tabloid El Espacio. He was the father of the politician Pablo Ardila Sierra. He died on 30 January 2019 in Barcelona, at the age of 100.
