= Apostolic Vicariate of Inírida =

Catholic missionary jurisdiction in Colombia

Apostolic Vicariate of Inírida Apostolicus Vicariatus Iniridanus

Location
- Country: Colombia
- Coordinates: 3°54′N 67°54′W

Statistics
- Area: 86,000 km^{2} (33,000 sq mi)
- Population: Total; Catholics: (as of 2010); 30,000; 10,200 (34%)
- Parishes: 5

Information
- Denomination: Catholic Church
- Rite: Roman Rite
- Established: 30 November 1996 (29 years ago)
- Cathedral: Catedral Nuestra Señora del Carmen

Current leadership
- Pope: Leo XIV
- Vicar Apostolic: Joselito Carreño Quiñonez, M.X.Y.

Map

The Vicariate Apostolic of Inírida (Latin: Apostolicus Vicariatus Iniridanus) in the Catholic Church is located in the town of Inírida, Guainía in Colombia.

== History ==
On 30 November 1996 Blessed John Paul II split the Vicariate Apostolic of Mitú-Puerto Inírida in two and created the Apostolic Vicariate of Mitú and the Vicariate Apostolic of Inírida.

== Ordinaries ==
- Antonio Bayter Abud, M.X.Y. (30 Nov 1996 – 3 Dec 2013)
- Joselito Carreño Quiñonez, M.X.Y. (3 Dec 2013 - )

== See also ==
- Roman Catholicism in Colombia
