= Antonio Bayter Abud =

Colombian Catholic priest (1933–2020)

Antonio Bayter Abud M.X.Y.
- Vicar Apostolic of Inírida
- Church: Catholic Church
- See: Apostolic Vicariate of Inírida
- In office: 30 November 1996 – 3 December 2013
- Predecessor: Vicariate established
- Successor: Joselito Carreño Quiñonez
- Other post: Titular Bishop of Sucarda (1996-2020)

Orders
- Ordination: 21 October 1956
- Consecration: 16 February 1997 by Paolo Romeo

Personal details
- Born: 8 October 1933 El Banco, Magdalena Department, Colombia
- Died: 21 August 2020 (aged 86) Medellín, Antioquia Department, Colombia

Antonio Bayter Abud (8 October 1933 – 21 August 2020) was a Colombian Roman Catholic bishop.

Bayter Abud was born in Colombia and was ordained to the priesthood in 1956. He served as titular bishop of Sucarda and as bishop of the Apostolic Vicariate of Inírida, Colombia from 1997 until 2013.
