= Caribbean Bloc of the FARC-EP =

The Caribbean Bloc of the FARC-EP was a medium-sized FARC-EP bloc which operated in the northern areas of Colombia and along the Caribbean coast, with routes and access to the coast being strategically important, and was thus sometimes referred to as the Northern Bloc. At the end of the 1990s the group had much control over the rural areas connecting the urban centers of the Caribbean region, but in the 2000s was forced to retreat into the more inhospitable Andes. The group's leaders have been held responsible for numerous kidnappings and killings along the entire Caribbean coast, including the urban centers Cartagena, Barranquilla, Valledupar and Santa Marta. This bloc was also the center of the high-profile kidnapping of Fernando Araújo, who recovered his freedom during a Colombian National Army offensive in early 2007.

The specific divisions of the group are arguable. Some of the believed divisions or "fronts", as they were commonly call them, are shown below. Many of these fronts sometimes worked together towards a certain mission, while others were further divided into "columns" and "companies" with a smaller number of members. For more general information see FARC-EP Chain of Command.

== Commanders ==
Alias	Name	Note
Bertulfo Álvarez	Emilio Cabrera Díaz	
Martín Caballero	Gustavo Rueda Díaz	Killed in 2007.
Simón Trinidad	Ricardo Palmera Pineda	Arrested and extradited in 2004.

== 19th Front ==
Also known as the José Prudencio Padilla Front, it was composed by up to 200 combatants and operated mostly in the Magdalena Department.

Alias	Name	Note
Solís Almeida	Abelardo Caicedo Colorado	
Felipe Arango		Killed in 2007.

- Includes the Marcos Sánchez Castellón Mobile Column.

== 35th Front ==
Also known as the Benkos Bioho Front, it was composed by up to 220 combatants and operated mostly in the Sucre Department.

Alias	Name	Note
"Jader"	Miguel Gaviria Fontalvo	Arrested in 2008.
Dúber	Rubén Darío Pérez Contreras	Killed in 2008.
Oswaldo	Guillermo Róquemes Díaz	Killed in 2007.
"El Pollo Isrra"	Víctor Antonio Lopera Úsuga	Killed in 2008.
"Freddy", "Mocho", "Chiqui"	César David Villalobos Cadena	Arrested in May 2010.

== 37th Front ==
This front was considered to be the most dangerous faction of the Caribbean Bloc. It was composed by up to 250 combatants and operated mostly in the Bolívar Department. The 37th Front had a historically strong presence in northern Colombia, once controlling large amounts of territory. Military pressure in the 2000s forced the unit to retreat deeper south while their numbers dwindled. The front was announced as dismantled by the Colombian president Juan Manuel Santos in June 2012.

Alias	Name	Note
Martín Caballero	Gustavo Rueda Díaz	Killed in 2007.
"Libardo" or "Chamo"	José Alberto Díaz Meza	Handed himself to the Colombian army on September 24, 2011
"Silvio" or "El Frances."	Luis Enrique Benitez Cañola	Commander of the front, killed in June 2012.

- Includes the Cacique Yurbaco Column.

== 41st Front ==
Also known as the Cacique Upar Front, this front was composed by up to 180 combatants and operated mostly in the Cesar Department.

Alias	Name	Note
Gonzalo		First commander
Willington, Caraquemada	Carlos Julio Vargas Medina	

== 59th Front ==
This front was composed by up to 200 combatants and operated mostly in the Cesar and Guajira Departments.

Alias	Name	Note
Aldemar Altamiranda	Gilberto de Jesús Giraldo Davis	
El Indio	Higuen Enrique Martínez Arias	Probably killed in 2007
Pedro Iguarán	Aldo Manuel Moscote	May have assumed Rodrigo Granda´s position after his arrest.

== José Antequera Urban Front ==
This urban network was directly composed by 30 combatants, although it was suspected to include a much larger number of members. It was considered FARC's greatest influence in the coastal city of Barranquilla.

Alias	Name	Note
Juancho, JJ	Juan José Domínguez Vargas	Arrested in 2006.
