= Ansermanuevo =

- Municipality and town
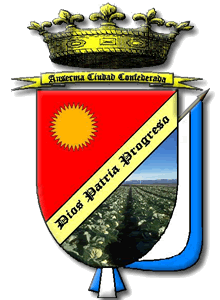
- Flag Coat of arms

- Location of the municipality and town of Ansermanuevo in the Valle del Cauca Department of Colombia.

- Location in Colombia
- Coordinates: 4°48′N 76°0′W
- Country: Colombia
- Department: Valle del Cauca Department

Population (2015)
  - Total: 19,557
- Time zone: UTC-5 (Colombia Standard Time)
- Climate: Af

Ansermanuevo is a town and municipality located in the Department of Valle del Cauca, Colombia.
