= 2026 in public domain =

Worldwide map of copyright term length

When a work's copyright expires, it enters the public domain. The following is a list of creators whose works entered the public domain in 2026. Since laws vary globally, the copyright status of some works are not uniform.

== Entering the public domain in countries with life + 50 years ==
In most countries of Africa and Asia, as well as Belarus, Bolivia, and New Zealand, a work enters the public domain 50 years after the creator's death.

Names	Country	Death	Occupation	Notable work
John Akar	Sierra Leone	23 June 1975	Entertainer, writer, diplomat	High We Exalt Thee, Realm of the Free
Leroy Anderson	United States	18 May 1975	Composer	Sleigh Ride, Blue Tango, The Typewriter, The Syncopated Clock
Ivo Andrić	Yugoslavia	13 March 1975	Writer, Poet	The Bridge on the Drina
Pablo Antonio	Philippines	14 June 1975	Architect	Ideal Theater, Life Theater, White Cross Orphanage, Capitan Luis Gonzaga Building
Hannah Arendt	Germany; United States	4 December 1975	Writer, Political philosopher	The Human Condition, Eichmann in Jerusalem
Mikhail Bakhtin	Soviet Union	7 March 1975	Philosopher	Problems of Dostoevsky's Poetics, Rabelais and His World
Thomas Hart Benton	United States	19 January 1975	Painter	
James Blish	United States	30 July 1975	Writer	Cities in Flight, Star Trek novelizations
Arthur Bliss	United Kingdom	27 March 1975	Composer	Compositions
Tim Buckley	United States	29 June 1975	Guitarist, Singer, Songwriter	Discography
Chiang Kai-shek	Republic of China	5 April 1975	President of the Republic of China	China's Destiny (中國之命運)
Luigi Dallapiccola	Italy	19 February 1975	Composer	Compositions
Lefty Frizzell	United States	19 July 1975	Singer, Songwriter	Discography
Konstantine Gamsakhurdia	Georgia	17 July 1975	Writer	The Right Hand of the Grand Master
Fernando Guillén Martínez	Colombia	30 April 1975	Journalist, historian, essayist	Estructura histórica, social y política de Colombia
Bob Montana	United States	4 January 1975	Cartoonist, Artist	Archie
Bernard Herrmann	United States	24 December 1975	Composer	Film scores
Edna Mayne Hull	Canada	20 January 1975	Science fiction author	Planets for Sale
Julian Huxley	United Kingdom	14 February 1975	Evolutionary biologist	Works
Rowland V. Lee	United States	21 December 1975	Director, Actor, Screenwriter, Producer	
Murray Leinster	United States	8 June 1975	Writer	Bibliography
Herbert List	Germany	4 April 1975	Photographer	Collection at Deutsche Fotothek
Donal R. Michalsky	United States	31 December 1975	Composer	Fanfare after 17th Century Dances
Elijah Muhammad	United States	25 February 1975	Leader of the Nation of Islam	Message to the Blackman in America
Efraín Orozco Morales	Colombia	27 August 1975	Musician, composer	"El Regreso"
Pier Paolo Pasolini	Italy	2 November 1975	Film director	The Gospel According to St. Matthew, Salò, or the 120 Days of Sodom
Sheikh Mujibur Rahman	Bangladesh	15 August 1975	Politician	Books
Jacqueline Nova	Colombia	13 June 1975	Musician, composer	
Sarvepalli Radhakrishnan	India	17 April 1975	Philosopher, President of India	The Dhammapada, The Principal Upanishads
Alfred Hamish Reed	New Zealand	15 January 1975	Writer, publisher	The Gumdiggers: The Story of Kauri Gum
Luis Ariel Rey	Colombia	31 May 1975	Musician, songwriter	
Maria Elizabeth Rothmann	South Africa	7 September 1975	Author	Kinders van die Voortrek
Nora Sanderson	New Zealand	2 March 1975	Romance writer	Hospital in New Zealand
Rod Serling	United States	28 June 1975	Screenwriter, Playwright, Television producer	The Twilight Zone
R. C. Sherriff	United Kingdom	13 November 1975	Playwright, writer	Journey's End, The Hopkins Manuscript
Dmitri Shostakovich	Soviet Union	9 August 1975	Composer	Compositions
Noble Sissle	United States	17 December 1975	Jazz composer, Lyricist	Shuffle Along, I'm Just Wild About Harry
Christopher Strachey	United Kingdom	18 May 1975	Computer scientist	CPL, Fundamental Concepts in Programming Languages
Bill Sutch	New Zealand	28 September 1975	Economist	Poverty and Progress in New Zealand, The Quest for Security in New Zealand
Alejandro Tovar	Colombia	23 February 1975	Musician, composer	"Pachito Eché"
Arnold J. Toynbee	United Kingdom	22 October 1975	Historian	A Study of History
Thornton Wilder	United States	7 December 1975	Playwright, Novelist	The Bridge of San Luis Rey, Our Town
P. G. Wodehouse	United Kingdom	14 February 1975	Playwright, Novelist	Bibliography
Fritz Wotruba	Austria	28 August 1975	Sculptor	Wotruba Church
Giselda Zani	Uruguay	1975	Poet, short story writer, critic	La costa despierta
Roger Lescot	France	3 February 1975	Orientalist, diplomat, researcher of Kurdish	Textes Kurdes
Kang Sheng	China	16 December 1975	Politician, caligrapher	

== Entering the public domain in countries with life + 60 years ==
In Bangladesh, India, and Venezuela a work enters the public domain 60 years after the creator's death.

Names	Country	Death	Occupation	Notable work
Ahn Eak-tai	South Korea	16 September 1965	Composer	Aegukga, Symphonic Fantasy Korea
Katharine Anthony	United States	20 November 1965	Biographer	The Lambs
Jacques Audiberti	France	10 July 1965	Playwright, poet, novelist	
Martin Buber	Austria; Israel	13 June 1965	Philosopher	I and Thou
Thornton W. Burgess	United States	5 June 1965	Children's book author	
Winston Churchill	United Kingdom	24 January 1965	Prime Minister of the United Kingdom	The Second World War, A History of the English-Speaking Peoples
Thomas B. Costain	Canada; United States	8 October 1965	Journalist	
Maria Dąbrowska	Poland	19 May 1965	Novelist, essayist, playwright	Noce i dnie
T. S. Eliot	United Kingdom; United States	4 January 1965	Poet, essayist, playwright	Works
Walter Evans-Wentz	United States	17 July 1965	Anthropologist	English translation of The Tibetan Book of the Dead
Eleanor Farjeon	United Kingdom	5 June 1965	Children's writer and poet	"Morning Has Broken"
Lorraine Hansberry	United States	12 January 1965	Journalist, playwright	A Raisin in the Sun
John Davy Hayward	United Kingdom	17 September 1965	Literary editor, bibliophile	
Shirley Jackson	United States	8 August 1965	Novelist, short story writer	"The Lottery", Life Among the Savages, The Haunting of Hill House
Randall Jarrell	United States	14 October 1965	Poet, novelist	Pictures from an Institution
Dorothy Kilgallen	United States	8 November 1965	Newspaper columnist and journalist	
Percy Lubbock	United Kingdom	1 August 1965	Essayist, critic, biographer	
W. Somerset Maugham	United Kingdom	16 December 1965	Novelist, dramatist, short story writer	Works
John Metcalfe	United States	31 July 1965	Novelist, short story writer	
Betty Miller	Ireland	24 November 1965	Writer, journalist, novelist	
Edgar Mittelholzer	Guyana; United Kingdom	6 May 1965	Novelist	
Fan S. Noli	Albania	13 March 1965	Bishop and poet	
Park Su-geun	South Korea	6 May 1965	Painter	Woman Pounding Grain, A Wash Place, Old Tree and Woman
Edogawa Ranpo	Japan	28 July 1965	Writer of mystery stories	
Syngman Rhee	South Korea	19 July 1965	President of South Korea	The Spirit of Independence
Aksel Sandemose	Denmark; Norway	6 August 1965	Novelist	
Arthur M. Schlesinger Sr.	United States	30 October 1965	Historian	
Jack Spicer	United States	17 August 1965	Poet	
Howard Spring	Wales	3 May 1965	Novelist	
T. S. Stribling	United States	8 July 1965	Novelist	
Jun'ichirō Tanizaki	Japan	30 July 1965	Novelist	
Yoon Yong-ha	South Korea	23 July 1965	Composer	Barley Field, The Leaf Boat, Gwangbokjeol song

== Entering the public domain in countries with life + 70 years ==
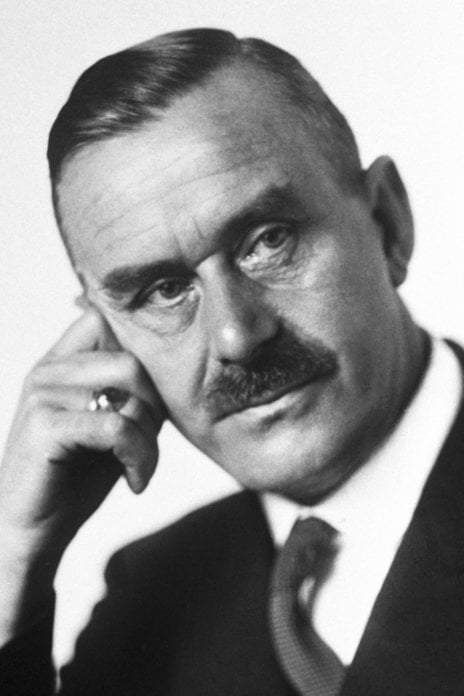
The literature of Thomas Mann entered the public domain in Europe in 2026. He is also part of the first wave of authors to enter the public domain in Australia in twenty years.

With the exception of Belarus (Life + 50 years) and Spain (which has a copyright term of Life + 80 years for creators that died before 1987), a work enters the public domain in Europe 70 years after the creator's death, if it was published during the creator's lifetime. For previously unpublished material, those who publish it first will have the publication rights for 25 years. The same term applies in much of South America, and parts of western Africa. As such, the works of all authors who died in 1955 entered the European public domain in 2026.

2026 marks the first year since 2005 that works entered the public domain in Australia, which changed its copyright term length from a "plus 50" law to a "plus 70" law in 2004, as stated in Australia's own section below.

One of the most significant authors whose works entered the European public domain in 2026 is German writer Thomas Mann, whose novels (Buddenbrooks, Doctor Faustus, and others) are known for their high symbolism and their insight into the psychology of the artist and the intellectual. Other notable examples of authors whose works entered the public domain include French writer Léon Werth, Italian writer Guido Battelli, British writer Clemence Housman, American writers James Agee (the author of A Death in the Family) and Dale Carnegie (the author of How to Win Friends and Influence People), Space Lawyer author Nat Schachner, poets Wallace Stevens and Paul Claudel, Swiss composer Arthur Honegger, Italian composer Francesco Balilla Pratella, Russian composer Isaak Dunayevsky, "Charleston" writer James P. Johnson, American film director Lloyd Bacon and screenwriters William C. deMille and Robert Riskin, and French artists Yves Tanguy and Fernand Léger. The works of Spanish philosopher José Ortega y Gasset also entered the public domain in European countries other than his native Spain. The publications of physicist Albert Einstein, physician Sir Alexander Fleming, mathematician Hermann Weyl, and economist Herbert Stanley Jevons additionally entered the public domain.

== Entering the public domain in countries with life + 80 years ==
Spain has a copyright term of life + 80 years for creators that died before 1987. In Colombia and Equatorial Guinea, a work enters the public domain 80 years after the creator's death.

Names	Country	Death	Occupation	Notable work
Luis Antonio Calvo	Colombia	22 April 1945	Musician, composer	Four intermezzos
Fulgencio García	Colombia	4 March 1945	Musician, composer	"La Gata Golosa"
Andrés de Santa Maria	Colombia	29 April 1945	Painter	En la Playa de Macuto
Ignacio Zuloaga	Spain	24 June 1945	Painter	

== Russia and Ukraine ==
Russia has a copyright term of life + 70 years in general, with two special provisions:

- extra 4 years for those who fought in or worked during the so-called Great Patriotic War (that is, the Eastern Front of World War II), and/or
- copyright term starting from the date of rehabilitation for unlawfully prosecuted and posthumously rehabilitated.

Ukraine also has a special provision that the copyright term starts from the date of rehabilitation for unlawfully prosecuted and posthumously rehabilitated, which applies only to authors who died in 1951 or later.

Names	Country	Death	Occupation	Notable work
Vasily Mikhaylovich Alekseyev	Russia, worked during the war	12 May 1951	Sinologist, translator	Fox's Wiles
Alexei Badayev	Russia, worked during the war	11 March 1951	Politician	How Bolshevik deputies fought in the State Duma
Nikolay Brodskiy	Russia, worked during the war	5 June 1951	Literary scholar	Biographies of Pushkin and Lermontov
Vladimir Kirshon	Russia, rehabilitated 1955	28 July 1938	Writer	Miraculous Alloy
Georgii Nadson	Russia, rehabilitated 1955	15 April 1939	Biologist	Changements des caractères héréditaires, provoqués expérimentalement et la création de nouvelles races stables chez les levures
Joseph Neman	Ukraine, rehabilitated 1955	18 November 1952	Aerospace engineer	Advanced ideas of Soviet aircraft designers
Viktor Savin	Russia, rehabilitated 1955	11 August 1943	Writer	State Anthem of the Komi Republic
Efim Shchadenko	Russia, fought in the war	6 September 1951	General	Donbass and its armed struggle
Nikolai Vavilov	Russia, rehabilitated 1955	26 January 1943	Agronomist, geneticist	Origin and Geography of Cultivated Plants

== Australia ==
In 2004 copyright in Australia changed from a "plus 50" law to a "plus 70" law, in line with the United States and the European Union. But the change was not made retroactive (unlike the 1995 change in the European Union which brought some (British and possibly other) authors back into copyright, especially those who died from 1925 to 1944). Hence, the work of an author who died before 1955 is normally in the public domain in Australia; but the copyright of authors was extended to 70 years after death for those who died in 1955 or later. 2026 was the first year since 2005 that new Australian authors came out of copyright, with those who died in 1955. Specific Australian authors whose works entered the public domain this year include writer Charles Shaw and artists John Radecki and Antonio Dattilo Rubbo.

Copyright for Australian newspaper content originally published in 1955 also expired on 1 January 2026, which now allows content from 1955 newspapers to be published on Trove, the National Library of Australia's online database.

== Canada ==
In 2022, copyright in Canada changed from a "plus 50" law to a "plus 70" law, in line with the United States and the European Union. But the change, like Australia's before it, was not made retroactive. No more new Canadian authors will come out of copyright until 1 January 2043 (those who died in 1972). Crown copyright was not changed, thus any government works published in 1974 entered the public domain in 2025.

== United States ==
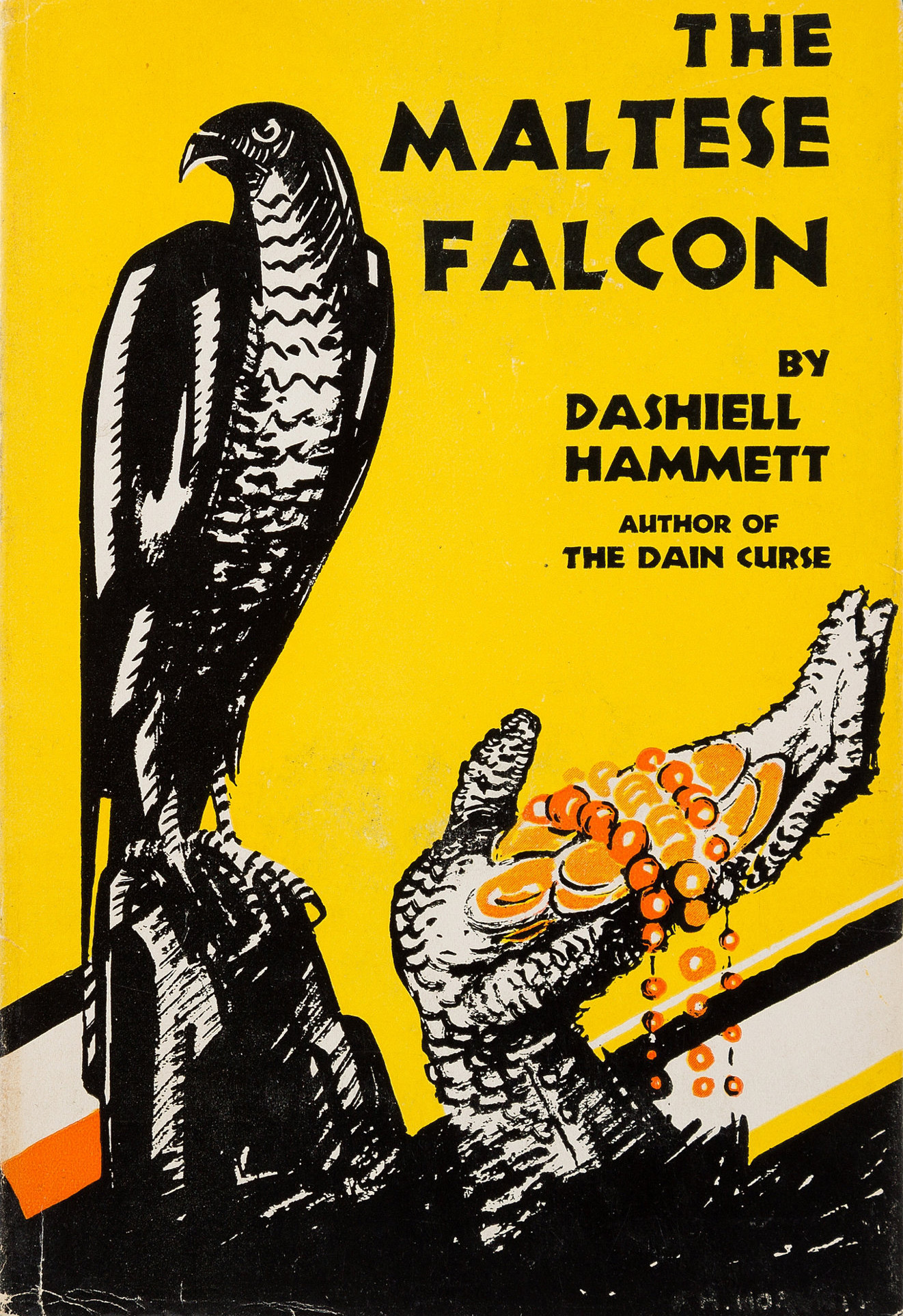
The Maltese Falcon by Dashiell Hammett

Under the Copyright Term Extension Act, books published in 1930, films released in 1930, and other works published in 1930 entered the public domain in 2026. Unpublished works whose authors died in 1955 also entered the public domain.

The major works of literature that entered the public domain in 2026 are William Faulkner's novel As I Lay Dying, Dashiell Hammett's The Maltese Falcon as a complete novel, Agatha Christie's first Miss Marple novel The Murder at the Vicarage, the original edition of the first Nancy Drew mystery story The Secret of the Old Clock by pseudonymous author Carolyn Keene, the first Elson-Gray Readers books featuring Dick and Jane by William S. Gray, Noël Coward's play Private Lives, T. S. Eliot's poem "Ash Wednesday", Evelyn Waugh's novel Vile Bodies, John Dos Passos' novel The 42nd Parallel (the first book in his U.S.A. trilogy), Edna Ferber's Pulitzer Prize-winning novel Cimarron, Dorothy L. Sayers' crime novel Strong Poison, J. B. Priestly's novel Angel Pavement, Olaf Stapledon's science fiction novel Last and First Men, Sigmund Freud's book Civilization and Its Discontents in its original German, W. Somerset Maugham's novel Cakes and Ale, Bertrand Russell's The Conquest of Happiness, and the children's books The Little Engine That Could by Watty Piper, Swallows and Amazons by Arthur Ransome, and The Cat Who Went to Heaven by Elizabeth Coatsworth.

Other notable literary works of fiction that entered the public domain include Christie's other novels The Mysterious Mr. Quin and Giant's Bread (the latter of which she wrote pseudonymously as "Mary Westmacott"); The Documents in the Case co-written by Sayers and Robert Eustace; John Dickson Carr's first detective novel It Walks By Night; the mystery and crime novels Mystery Mile by Margery Allingham, The French Powder Mystery by Ellery Queen, Enter the Saint by Leslie Charteris, and The Door by Mary Roberts Rinehart; the original serialized version of Max Brand's Destry Rides Again; the dramas The Green Pastures by Marc Connelly, Rise and Fall of the City of Mahagonny and The Decision by Bertolt Brecht (the former co-written with Kurt Weill) in their original German, The Human Voice by Jean Cocteau in its original French, and The Barretts of Wimpole Street by Rudolf Besier; the children's books The Tale of Little Pig Robinson by Beatrix Potter and The Yellow Knight of Oz by Ruth Plumly Thompson; Nancy Drew's next three stories The Hidden Staircase, The Bungalow Mystery, and The Mystery at Lilac Inn; The Hardy Boys' story The Great Airport Mystery; Hart Crane's long poem "The Bridge"; the Collected Poems of Robert Frost; W. H. Auden's first major poetry collection, simply called Poems; and the first English translations of Franz Kafka's The Castle and Hermann Sudermann's The Excursion to Tilsit. Notable nonfiction entrants to the public domain include William Empson's Seven Types of Ambiguity (a foundational work of literary criticism), Ronald Fisher's The Genetical Theory of Natural Selection, The Lives of a Bengal Lancer by Francis Yeats-Brown, Memoirs of an Infantry Officer by Siegfried Sassoon, and The Mysterious Universe by James Jeans. He Done Her Wrong, a wordless graphic novel by Milt Gross, also entered the public domain.

The 1930 film adaptation of All Quiet on the Western Front, the third film to win the Academy Award for Best Picture, entered the United States public domain in 2026.

Another film that entered the public domain in 2026 is Animal Crackers, the second feature film of the Marx Brothers.

Since the following year's film Cimarron was registered for copyright in 1930, it entered the public domain in 2026, leaving 2027 without a Best Picture Academy Award winner among its public domain entrants.

Notable films that entered the public domain in 2026 include the following:

- Lewis Milestone's All Quiet on the Western Front, the third film to win the Best Picture and Best Director Academy Awards;
- Josef von Sternberg's The Blue Angel, starring Emil Jannings and Marlene Dietrich, which launched the latter to international stardom;
- Animal Crackers starring the Marx Brothers;
- the Laurel and Hardy comedy Another Fine Mess;
- Soup to Nuts featuring an early iteration of The Three Stooges;
- Anna Christie, Greta Garbo's first sound film;
- Hell's Angels, an aviation epic directed by Howard Hughes and starring Jean Harlow, which marked the actress' breakthrough;
- Morocco, also directed by Josef von Sternberg and starring Marlene Dietrich, which marked the Hollywood debut of Dietrich (who would go on to make five additional films with the director) and earned four Academy Award nominations;
- the French film L'Âge d'Or (The Golden Age), directed by Luis Buñuel, which entered the U.S. public domain after having been banned in its home country for nearly fifty years;
- George Hill's The Big House and Min and Bill, both starring Wallace Beery;
- Robert Z. Leonard's The Divorcee starring Norma Shearer, which won her the Academy Award for Best Actress;
- The Dawn Patrol, directed by Howard Hawks and starring Douglas Fairbanks Jr.;
- Alfred Hitchcock's films Juno and the Paycock and Murder!;
- The Big Trail, with John Wayne in his first starring role, which is an early example of a film produced in widescreen format;
- King of Jazz starring Paul Whiteman, which was Bing Crosby's film debut and one of the most notable examples of early talkies produced in two-strip Technicolor;
- Robert Siodmak's first film People on Sunday with its original German script, written by Billy Wilder;
- René Clair's Under the Roofs of Paris in its original French;
- G. W. Pabst's Westfront 1918 in its original German;
- John Ford's films Up the River and Born Reckless, the former of which was the feature-film debut for both Spencer Tracy and Humphrey Bogart;
- F. W. Murnau's third American film City Girl;
- Feet First starring Harold Lloyd;
- Journey's End, the directorial debut of James Whale;
- Frank Capra's film Ladies of Leisure;
- Ernst Lubitsch's film Monte Carlo, starring Jack Buchanan and Jeanette MacDonald;
- Lloyd Bacon's film A Notorious Affair with Billie Dove and Basil Rathbone;
- Roland West's film The Bat Whispers, an influential early horror film;
- Frank Borzage's film Liliom, the basis for the musical Carousel;
- Whoopee!, an early two-strip Technicolor film featuring Eddie Cantor;
- The Royal Family of Broadway, one of George Cukor's first films as a director;
- Cecil B. DeMille's film Madam Satan;
- the French film Prix de Beauté (Beauty Prize) starring Louise Brooks;
- Jack Conway's The Unholy Three, starring Lon Chaney in his only speaking role and released shortly before the actor's death;
- the Buster Keaton films Doughboys and Free and Easy (the latter of which gave him his first speaking role);
- King Vidor's Billy the Kid starring Beery and Johnny Mack Brown;
- Just Imagine, an early science fiction musical directed by David Butler;
- Manslaughter starring Claudette Colbert and Fredric March;
- Tod Browning's film Outside the Law starring Edward G. Robinson;
- The Big Pond starring Maurice Chevalier and Colbert;
- Lightnin' starring Will Rogers;
- War Nurse, a female-fronted World War I drama starring Anita Page;
- Laughter, directed by Harry d'Abbadie d'Arrast and starring March alongside Nancy Carroll, which was critically acclaimed in its own time but is now an overlooked gem among early sound films;
- Follow Thru, directed by Lloyd Corrigan and starring Carroll alongside Charles "Buddy" Rogers, one of the first all-Technicolor sound musicals to be preserved in full color;
- Niebezpieczny romans (Dangerous Romance), Tonka of the Gallows, The Song of Love and Goodbye Argentina, the first sound films for Poland, the Czech lands, Italy and Argentina respectively; and
- the British drama The Man with the Flower in His Mouth, television's oldest broadcast (which is currently lost).

The 1931 films Little Caesar, directed by Mervyn LeRoy and starring Robinson as the titular gangster, and Cimarron, the adaptation of Ferber's novel and the year's Best Picture Academy Award winner, entered the public domain in 2026 instead of 2027 because they were released so early in the year that they carry 1930 copyright registrations instead.

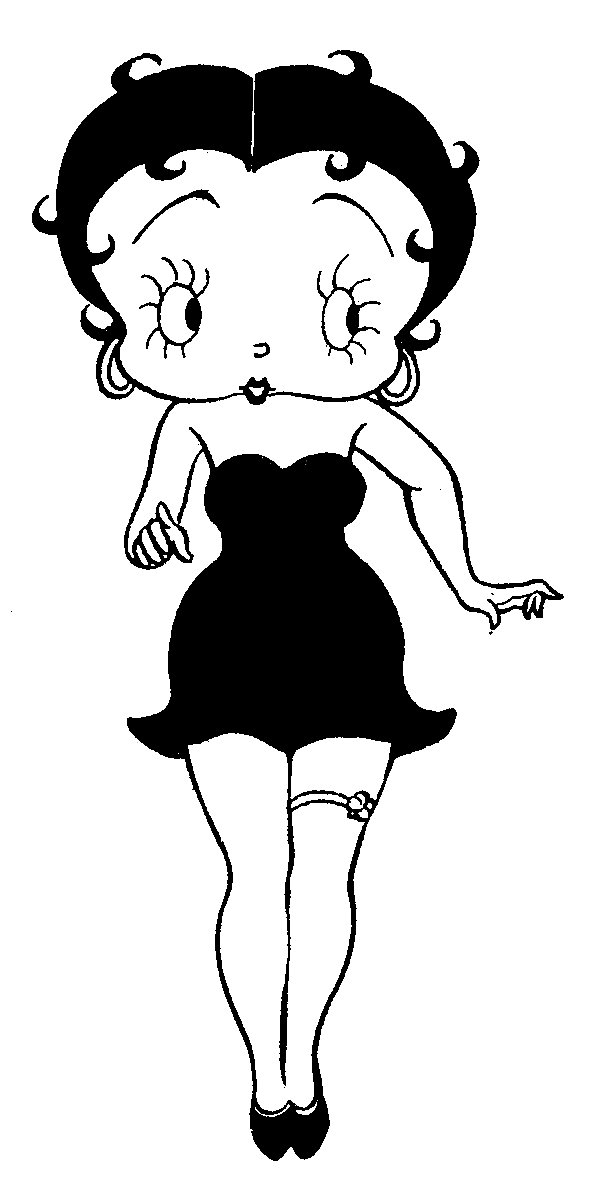
The character Betty Boop in her earliest incarnation entered the U.S. public domain in 2026.

Dave Fleischer's first four Betty Boop cartoons — Dizzy Dishes, Barnacle Bill, Accordion Joe, and Mysterious Mose — entered into the public domain, as did Hot Dog, the debut film of Bimbo. The 1930 Mickey Mouse cartoons entered the public domain this year as well, bringing with them the design of Pluto, who entered the public domain through his debut appearance in The Chain Gang (where he was an unnamed prison guard dog), and his second appearance as "Rover" (owned by Minnie Mouse) in The Picnic. (Note: Mickey's ownership of the bloodhound character will not enter the public domain until 2027, through the short The Moose Hunt.) Also entering the public domain were the Disney studio's second year of Silly Symphony shorts, and an Ub Iwerks cartoon character created independently of Disney: Flip the Frog, whose debut film Fiddlesticks was the first sound cartoon in color. The initial week of the Mickey Mouse comic strip (Note: The rest of Mickey's comic strips from 1930 were not renewed properly; the same applies to his strips from later years up until 1935. Since Clarabelle Cow was introduced in the strip before debuting in animation in The Shindig, she was already in the public domain as a result of that.) and the first appearances of Chic Young's Blondie also entered the public domain, (Note: In Young's first Blondie comics, the title character was a flapper, and Dagwood was the young heir to a railway company. Strips from 1935 where Dagwood's iconic sandwich debuted according to Duke University School of Law may have been renewed, but the idea of a character's fixation with food is often considered to be uncopyrightable, and the copyright status of the sandwich is a bit murky due to it also being used/parodied in various works, most notably the Scooby-Doo franchise of television cartoon shows. Furthermore, King Features Weekly was not started until May 4, 1933, and any subsequent strips beyond the first up to that date (including those where Dagwood and Blondie married) were not renewed and are undoubtedly in the public domain as well.) as did Hergé's first Quick & Flupke comic strips and the full album version of his Tintin in the Land of the Soviets, the character's debut story, in its original French black-and-white version (accompanied by part of the serialized version of Tintin in the Congo). The first cartoons in the Looney Tunes series, featuring Bosko, were already in the public domain with non-renewed copyrights, as were the first comic strips of the character Joe Palooka.

Notable popular songs that entered the public domain in 2026 include "Dream a Little Dream of Me", which spawned 400 recorded versions and was a signature song for Mama Cass; Johnny Green's song "Body and Soul", the most recorded jazz standard of all time; George and Ira Gershwin's songs "Embraceable You", "But Not for Me" and "I Got Rhythm", the last of which introduced the "rhythm changes" which became a foundational jazz chord progression; Hoagy Carmichael's song "Georgia on My Mind", which was Ray Charles' signature song and is the state song of Georgia; "Get Happy", the first hit from songwriter Harold Arlen; Jimmy McHugh's song "On the Sunny Side of the Street"; Cole Porter's song "Love for Sale"; Rodgers and Hart's songs "Ten Cents a Dance" and "Dancing on the Ceiling"; Walter Donaldson's songs "Little White Lies", "You're Driving Me Crazy", and "My Baby Just Cares for Me" (the last of which was made famous later by Nina Simone); Howard Dietz and Arthur Schwartz's song "Something to Remember You By"; "Fine and Dandy"; "Someday I'll Find You"; "Three Little Words"; "Please Don't Talk About Me When I'm Gone"; "Sing, You Sinners"; "Cheerful Little Earful"; "Would You Like to Take a Walk?"; and "It Happened in Monterey". The first English translation of "Just a Gigolo" and John Philip Sousa's march The Royal Welch Fusiliers also entered the public domain. Some songs introduced in films became public domain as well: the entry of The Blue Angel brought along Dietrich's signature song "Falling in Love Again (Can't Help It)", that of Monte Carlo brought along the song "Beyond the Blue Horizon" as sung by MacDonald, and that of The Big Pond brought along the songs "Livin' in the Sunlight, Lovin' in the Moonlight" and "You Brought a New Kind of Love to Me".

Sound recordings that were published in 1925 entered the public domain, including Marian Anderson's recording of "Nobody Knows the Trouble I've Seen"; the song "Saint Louis Blues" as recorded by Bessie Smith and Louis Armstrong; the first recordings of the songs "Yes Sir, That's My Baby", "Sweet Georgia Brown", "Fascinating Rhythm", "I'll See You in My Dreams", "Everybody Loves My Baby", "Manhattan", "Remember", "If You Knew Susie", "Tea for Two", "Oh, How I Miss You Tonight", and "Dinah"; and the first recordings of the jazz standards "Davenport Blues" and "Indian Love Call".

Among the well-known works of art entering the public domain were Piet Mondrian's painting Composition with Red, Blue and Yellow, Paul Klee's painting Animal Friendship, Sophie Tauber-Arp's Composition of Circles and Overlapping Angles, Theo van Doesburg's Simultaneous Counter-Composition, the design of the Jules Rimet Cup, Edward Steichen's photograph Fashion for Vogue, Edward Weston's photograph Pepper No. 30, Martin Munkácsi's photograph Three Boys at Lake Tanganyika, and Ansel Adams' photobook Taos Pueblo. José Clemente Orozco's painting Prometheus and Grant Wood's painting American Gothic were already in the public domain; the former was published without a copyright notice, and the latter had a notice but was not renewed.

Public Domain Day 2026 attracted the interest of such media outlets as NPR, the Associated Press, Smithsonian Magazine, and the Los Angeles Times.

== Worldwide ==
Proof of Play, the studio behind the game Pirate Nation, announced it would release "as much of our code and art [of Pirate Nation] as possible" to the public domain through a Creative Commons 0-designation.

The Metropolitan Museum of Art published over a hundred three-dimensional models of iconic works from across its collection into the public domain through a CC0-lisence.

== See also ==
- List of American films of 1930
- 1930 in literature
- 1930 in music
- 1955 in literature and 1975 in literature for deaths of writers
- Public Domain Day
- Creative Commons
