= 2036 in public domain =

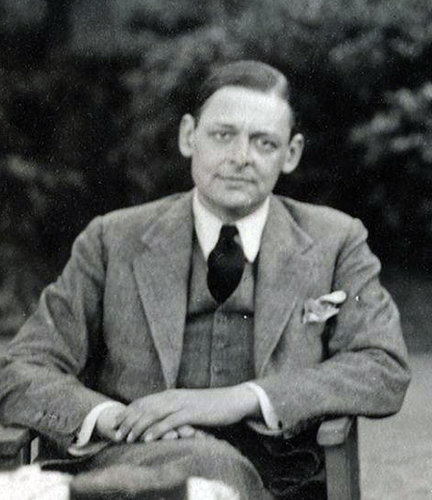
The literature of T. S. Eliot will enter the public domain in Europe in 2036.

When a work's copyright expires, it enters the public domain. Since laws vary globally, the copyright status of some works are not uniform. The following is a list of creators whose works enter the public domain in 2036 under the most common copyright regimes, assuming no further extensions to copyright terms become law in the interim.

== Countries with life + 70 years ==
Except for Belarus (Life + 50 years) and Spain (which has a copyright term of Life + 80 years for creators that died before 1988), a work enters the public domain in Europe 70 years after the creator's death, if it was published during the creator's lifetime. In addition, several other countries have a limit of 70 years. The list is sorted alphabetically and includes a notable work of the creator.

Names	Country	Death	Occupation	Notable work
Ahn Eak-tai	South Korea	16 September 1965	Composer	Aegukga, Symphonic Fantasy Korea
Katharine Anthony	United States	20 November 1965	Biographer	The Lambs
Jacques Audiberti	France	10 July 1965	Playwright, poet, novelist	
Martin Buber	Austria; Israel	13 June 1965	Philosopher	I and Thou
Thornton W. Burgess	United States	5 June 1965	Children's book author	
Winston Churchill	United Kingdom	24 January 1965	Prime Minister of the United Kingdom	The Second World War, A History of the English-Speaking Peoples
Thomas B. Costain	Canada; United States	8 October 1965	Journalist	
Maria Dąbrowska	Poland	19 May 1965	Novelist, essayist, playwright	Noce i dnie
T. S. Eliot	United Kingdom; United States	4 January 1965	Poet, essayist, playwright	Works
Walter Evans-Wentz	United States	17 July 1965	Anthropologist	English translation of The Tibetan Book of the Dead
Eleanor Farjeon	United Kingdom	5 June 1965	Children's writer and poet	"Morning Has Broken"
Lorraine Hansberry	United States	12 January 1965	Journalist, playwright	A Raisin in the Sun
John Davy Hayward	United Kingdom	17 September 1965	Literary editor, bibliophile	
Shirley Jackson	United States	8 August 1965	Novelist, short story writer	"The Lottery", Life Among the Savages, The Haunting of Hill House
Randall Jarrell	United States	14 October 1965	Poet, novelist	Pictures from an Institution
Dorothy Kilgallen	United States	8 November 1965	Newspaper columnist and journalist	
Percy Lubbock	United Kingdom	1 August 1965	Essayist, critic, biographer	
W. Somerset Maugham	United Kingdom	16 December 1965	Novelist, dramatist, short story writer	Works
John Metcalfe	United States	31 July 1965	Novelist, short story writer	
Betty Miller	Ireland	24 November 1965	Writer, journalist, novelist	
Edgar Mittelholzer	Guyana; United Kingdom	6 May 1965	Novelist	
Fan S. Noli	Albania	13 March 1965	Bishop and poet	
Park Su-geun	South Korea	6 May 1965	Painter	Woman Pounding Grain, A Wash Place, Old Tree and Woman
Edogawa Ranpo	Japan	28 July 1965	Writer of mystery stories	
Syngman Rhee	South Korea	19 July 1965	President of South Korea	The Spirit of Independence
Aksel Sandemose	Denmark; Norway	6 August 1965	Novelist	
Arthur M. Schlesinger Sr.	United States	30 October 1965	Historian	
Jack Spicer	United States	17 August 1965	Poet	
Howard Spring	Wales	3 May 1965	Novelist	
T. S. Stribling	United States	8 July 1965	Novelist	
Jun'ichirō Tanizaki	Japan	30 July 1965	Novelist	
Yoon Yong-ha	South Korea	23 July 1965	Composer	Barley Field, The Leaf Boat, Gwangbokjeol song

== Countries with life + 60 years ==
In Bangladesh, India, and Venezuela a work enters the public domain 60 years after the creator's death.

Names	Country	Death	Occupation	Notable work
John Akar	Sierra Leone	23 June 1975	Entertainer, writer, diplomat	High We Exalt Thee, Realm of the Free
Leroy Anderson	United States	18 May 1975	Composer	Sleigh Ride, Blue Tango, The Typewriter, The Syncopated Clock
Ivo Andrić	Yugoslavia	13 March 1975	Writer, Poet	The Bridge on the Drina
Pablo Antonio	Philippines	14 June 1975	Architect	Ideal Theater, Life Theater, White Cross Orphanage, Capitan Luis Gonzaga Building
Hannah Arendt	Germany; United States	4 December 1975	Writer, Political philosopher	The Human Condition, Eichmann in Jerusalem
Mikhail Bakhtin	Soviet Union	7 March 1975	Philosopher	Problems of Dostoevsky's Poetics, Rabelais and His World
Thomas Hart Benton	United States	19 January 1975	Painter	
James Blish	United States	30 July 1975	Writer	Cities in Flight, Star Trek novelizations
Arthur Bliss	United Kingdom	27 March 1975	Composer	Compositions
Tim Buckley	United States	29 June 1975	Guitarist, Singer, Songwriter	Discography
Chiang Kai-shek	Republic of China	5 April 1975	President of the Republic of China	China's Destiny (中國之命運)
Luigi Dallapiccola	Italy	19 February 1975	Composer	Compositions
Lefty Frizzell	United States	19 July 1975	Singer, Songwriter	Discography
Konstantine Gamsakhurdia	Georgia	17 July 1975	Writer	The Right Hand of the Grand Master
Fernando Guillén Martínez	Colombia	30 April 1975	Journalist, historian, essayist	Estructura histórica, social y política de Colombia
Bob Montana	United States	4 January 1975	Cartoonist, Artist	Archie
Bernard Herrmann	United States	24 December 1975	Composer	Film scores
Edna Mayne Hull	Canada	20 January 1975	Science fiction author	Planets for Sale
Julian Huxley	United Kingdom	14 February 1975	Evolutionary biologist	Works
Rowland V. Lee	United States	21 December 1975	Director, Actor, Screenwriter, Producer	
Murray Leinster	United States	8 June 1975	Writer	Bibliography
Herbert List	Germany	4 April 1975	Photographer	Collection at Deutsche Fotothek
Donal R. Michalsky	United States	31 December 1975	Composer	Fanfare after 17th Century Dances
Elijah Muhammad	United States	25 February 1975	Leader of the Nation of Islam	Message to the Blackman in America
Efraín Orozco Morales	Colombia	27 August 1975	Musician, composer	"El Regreso"
Pier Paolo Pasolini	Italy	2 November 1975	Film director	The Gospel According to St. Matthew, Salò, or the 120 Days of Sodom
Sheikh Mujibur Rahman	Bangladesh	15 August 1975	Politician	Books
Jacqueline Nova	Colombia	13 June 1975	Musician, composer	
Sarvepalli Radhakrishnan	India	17 April 1975	Philosopher, President of India	The Dhammapada, The Principal Upanishads
Alfred Hamish Reed	New Zealand	15 January 1975	Writer, publisher	The Gumdiggers: The Story of Kauri Gum
Luis Ariel Rey	Colombia	31 May 1975	Musician, songwriter	
Maria Elizabeth Rothmann	South Africa	7 September 1975	Author	Kinders van die Voortrek
Nora Sanderson	New Zealand	2 March 1975	Romance writer	Hospital in New Zealand
Rod Serling	United States	28 June 1975	Screenwriter, Playwright, Television producer	The Twilight Zone
R. C. Sherriff	United Kingdom	13 November 1975	Playwright, writer	Journey's End, The Hopkins Manuscript
Dmitri Shostakovich	Soviet Union	9 August 1975	Composer	Compositions
Noble Sissle	United States	17 December 1975	Jazz composer, Lyricist	Shuffle Along, I'm Just Wild About Harry
Christopher Strachey	United Kingdom	18 May 1975	Computer scientist	CPL, Fundamental Concepts in Programming Languages
Bill Sutch	New Zealand	28 September 1975	Economist	Poverty and Progress in New Zealand, The Quest for Security in New Zealand
Alejandro Tovar	Colombia	23 February 1975	Musician, composer	"Pachito Eché"
Arnold J. Toynbee	United Kingdom	22 October 1975	Historian	A Study of History
Thornton Wilder	United States	7 December 1975	Playwright, Novelist	The Bridge of San Luis Rey, Our Town
P. G. Wodehouse	United Kingdom	14 February 1975	Playwright, Novelist	Bibliography
Fritz Wotruba	Austria	28 August 1975	Sculptor	Wotruba Church
Giselda Zani	Uruguay	1975	Poet, short story writer, critic	La costa despierta
Roger Lescot	France	1975	Orientalist, diplomat, researcher of Kurdish	Textes Kurdes
Kang Sheng	China	16 December 1975	Politician, caligrapher	

== Countries with life + 50 years ==
In most countries of Africa and Asia, as well as Belarus, Bolivia, New Zealand, Egypt and Uruguay, a work enters the public domain 50 years after the creator's death.

Names	Country	Death	Occupation	Notable work
Alvah Bessie	United States	21 July 1985	Novelist, screenwriter	Objective, Burma!
László Bíró	Hungary	24 October 1985	Journalist, inventor	
Heinrich Böll	Germany	16 July 1985	Novelist and Nobel Laureate in Literature	
Fernand Braudel	France	27 November 1985	Historian	
Hedley Bull	United Kingdom	18 May 1985	Economist	
Basil Bunting	United Kingdom	17 April 1985	Poet	"Briggflatts"
Edward Buzzell	United States	11 January 1985	Film director	
Lucien Cailliet	France	3 January 1985	Composer, arranger, conductor	
Taylor Caldwell	United States	30 August 1985	Novelist	Dynasty of Death
Mihail Celarianu	Romania	5 December 1985	Poet, novelist	
Marc Chagall	France	28 March 1985	Artist	List of artworks by Marc Chagall
James Hadley Chase	United Kingdom	6 February 1985	Thriller novelist	
Radha Krishna Choudhary	India	15 March 1985	Historian, philosopher	
Sigerson Clifford	Ireland	1 January 1985	Poet, playwright, civil servant	
Lester Cole	United States	15 August 1985	Screenwriter	
Nikos Engonopoulos	Greece	31 October 1985	Poet	
Robert Graves	United Kingdom	7 December 1985	Novelist, poet, critic	
Leonard Gribble	United Kingdom	27 September 1985	Novelist	The Arsenal Stadium Mystery
Geoffrey Grigson	United Kingdom	25 November 1985	Poet, critic	
Carl Joachim Hambro	Norway	19 February 1985	Novelist, essayist, philologist	
James Hanley	United Kingdom	11 November 1985	Novelist, dramatist	Boy, The Furys
Henry Hathaway	United States	11 February 1985	Filmmaker	
Alfred Hayes	United States	14 August 1985	Novelist, poet, screenwriter	"Joe Hill"
Hu Feng	China	8 June 1985	Novelist	
Lawrence Hauben	United States	22 December 1985	Screenwriter	One Flew Over the Cuckoo's Nest
Talbot Jennings	United States	30 May 1985	Screenwriter	Mutiny on the Bounty
Alex La Guma	South Africa	11 October 1985	Novelist, political activist	A Soviet Journey, Time of the Butcherbird
Philip Larkin	United Kingdom	2 December 1985	Poet	The Whitsun Weddings, High Windows
Saunders Lewis	Wales	1 September 1985	Writer, broadcaster	
Johnny Marks	United States	3 September 1985	Songwriter, composer	"Rudolph the Red-Nosed Reindeer", "I Heard the Bells on Christmas Day", "Rockin' Around the Christmas Tree"
Karl Julius Marx	Germany	8 May 1985	Composer, music teacher	
Uku Masing	Estonia	25 April 1985	Religious philosopher, linguist, writer	
Josephine Miles	United States	12 May 1985	Poet, literary critic	
Albert Maltz	United States	26 April 1985	Screenwriter	
Elsa Morante	Italy	25 November 1985	Novelist	La storia
Robert Nathan	United States	25 May 1985	Novelist, poet	The Bishop's Wife, Portrait of Jennie
D. J. Opperman	South Africa	22 September 1985	Poet	
Joe Oriolo	United States	25 December 1985	Animator	Casper the Friendly Ghost, Felix the Cat
Ernst Orvil	Norway	16 June 1985	Novelist, poet, playwright	
Leslie Paul	Ireland	8 July 1985	Novelist	
John Paxton	United States	7 January 1985	Screenwriter	Crossfire
Alexis Rannit	Estonia	5 January 1985	Poet, critic	
Kate Roberts	Wales	14 April 1985	Writer	Feet in Chains
Denise Robins	United Kingdom	1 May 1985	Romantic novelist	
Heinz Roemheld	United States	11 February 1985	Composer	
Hilding Rosenberg	Sweden	18 May 1985	Composer, conductor	
Fran Ross	United States	17 September 1985	Satirist	Oreo
Morrie Ryskind	United States	24 August 1985	Screenwriter	
Carl Schmitt	Germany	7 April 1985	Political theorist	
Roger Sessions	United States	16 March 1985	Composer	
Paul Smith	United States	25 January 1985	Composer	Incidental scores for The Walt Disney Studios
Vasyl Stus	Ukraine	4 September 1985	Poet, translator, literary critic, journalist, human rights activist	
D. I. Suchianu	Romania	17 April 1985	Essayist, translator, social scientist, film theorist	
Diane Thomas	United States	October 21, 1985	Screenwriter	Romancing the Stone
Wanda Tuchock	United States	February 10, 1985	Film director and screenwriter	
Elwood Ullman	United States	October 11, 1985	Screenwriter	The Three Stooges films
Hilda Vaughan	Wales	4 November 1985	Novelist, short story writer	
Tom Waldman	United States	8 July 1985	Film and television screenwriter	
J. M. Wallace-Hadrill	United Kingdom	3 November 1985	Historian	
Judah Waten	Australia	29 July 1985	Novelist	Alien Son, Distant Land
Orson Welles	United States	10 October 1985	Playwright, director, writer, actor	Citizen Kane
John Wexley	United States	4 February 1985	Playwright, screenwriter, novelist	
E. B. White	United States	1 October 1985	Children's book author, writer on style	
Sara Woods	United Kingdom	6 November 1985	Crime fiction writer	

== Countries with life + 80 years ==
Spain has a copyright term of life + 80 years for creators that died before 1988. In Colombia and Equatorial Guinea, a work enters the public domain 80 years after the creator's death.

Names	Country	Death	Occupation	Notable work
Concha Espina	Spain	19 May 1955	Writer	Bibliography
Eusebio Ochoa	Colombia	24 September 1955	Composer, musician	"El profesor de canto"
José Ortega y Gasset	Spain	18 October 1955	Philosopher, Essayist	Works

== United States ==
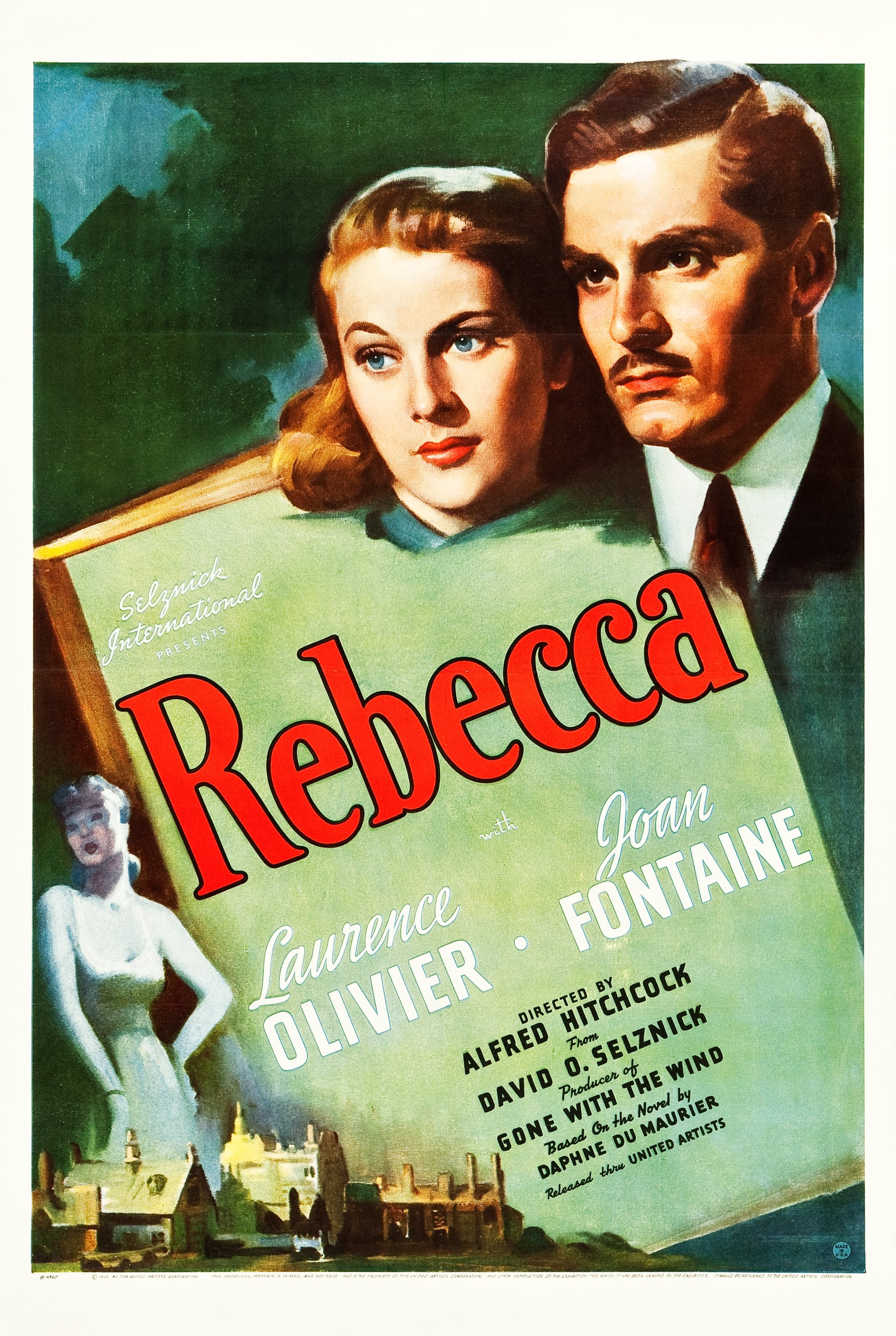
1940's Best Picture Academy Award winner Rebecca, Alfred Hitchcock's first Hollywood film, will enter the public domain in the United States in 2036.

Under the Copyright Term Extension Act, books published in 1940, films released in 1940, and other works published in 1940 will enter the public domain in 2036. Sound recordings published in 1935 and unpublished works whose authors died in 1965 will also enter the public domain.

Notable live-action films entering the public domain in 2036 include Alfred Hitchcock's Best Picture Academy Award winner Rebecca starring Laurence Olivier and Joan Fontaine, John Ford's adaptation of The Grapes of Wrath with Henry Fonda, George Cukor's The Philadelphia Story with Cary Grant and Katharine Hepburn, Charlie Chaplin's satirical comedy The Great Dictator, Kitty Foyle starring Ginger Rogers, Nazi propaganda films The Eternal Jew, Bismarck, The Heart of Queen, The Fox of Glenarvon, Wunschkonzert and Jud Süß, William Wyler's The Westerner with Gary Cooper, Preston Sturges' The Great McGinty, Walter Lang's Tin Pan Alley, Jack Conway's Boom Town with Clark Gable and Spencer Tracy, Cecil B. DeMille's North West Mounted Police, Busby Berkeley's Strike Up the Band with Mickey Rooney and Judy Garland, The Fighting 69th starring James Cagney, Michael Curtiz's Santa Fe Trail with Errol Flynn and Olivia de Havilland, the British film The Thief of Bagdad (which is notable for its innovative use of the chroma key process), and Abbott and Costello's first film One Night in the Tropics. Significant animated films entering the public domain include Walt Disney's Pinocchio and Fantasia, Tex Avery's cartoon A Wild Hare which officially launched the career of Bugs Bunny, Knock Knock with the debut of Woody Woodpecker, the first Tom and Jerry cartoon Puss Gets the Boot (with the characters under their respective initial identities as "Jasper and Jinx"), the Looney Tunes cartoon You Ought to Be in Pictures with Porky Pig and Daffy Duck, and the Donald Duck cartoon Mr. Duck Steps Out which marked the debut of the character Daisy Duck, the last member of Disney's "Sensational Six" to enter the public domain.

Among the literary works entering the public domain are Ernest Hemingway's novel For Whom the Bell Tolls, Agatha Christie's crime novels Sad Cypress and One, Two, Buckle My Shoe, Carson McCullers' novel The Heart Is a Lonely Hunter, Raymond Chandler's novel Farewell, My Lovely, Graham Greene's novel The Power and the Glory, Richard Wright's novel Native Son, Bertolt Brecht's play Mr Puntila and his Man Matti in its original German, Dr. Seuss's Horton Hatches the Egg introducing its titular elephant character, C. S. Lewis's nonfiction work The Problem of Pain, the Hardy Boys novel The Disappearing Floor, the Nancy Drew novel The Mystery of the Brass Bound Trunk, and the first issues of science fiction magazine Fantastic Novels. The earliest iterations of DC Comics' superheroes Robin, The Flash, the Green Lantern, Hawkman, Shazam (initially named Captain Marvel), The Spectre, and The Atom, and of its core supervillains The Joker, Catwoman, and Lex Luthor (as well as lesser villains Clayface and Hugo Strange), will also enter the public domain. Additionally, the original incarnation of one of Marvel Comics' most culturally-enduring superheroes, Captain America, who debuted in 1941, enters the public domain in 2036 instead of 2037 because his first comic book carries a 1940 copyright registration. (Note: When Captain America enters the public domain, his first sidekick Bucky Barnes (who later became an enemy of his, the Winter Soldier) and oldest nemesis Red Skull will enter with him.)

Works of art entering the public domain include Fougasse's propaganda poster series Careless Talk Costs Lives, Salvador Dalí's paintings The Face of War and Slave Market with the Disappearing Bust of Voltaire, Edward Hopper's painting Gas, and Frida Kahlo's painting Self-Portrait with Thorn Necklace and Hummingbird. Some important monuments entering the public domain are the first version of the Monument of the Discoveries in Lisbon, the Monumento a la Raza in Mexico City, and the Fishwife in Copenhagen.

Popular songs entering the public domain in 2036 include "Blueberry Hill", "Frenesi", "I'll Never Smile Again", "Only Forever", "Tuxedo Junction", and all of Woody Guthrie's songs from his album Dust Bowl Ballads. Additionally, the entry of Pinocchio will bring with it the film's entire soundtrack, including its signature song "When You Wish Upon a Star", the corporate anthem of Disney's company; while that of Fantasia will bring along the "Fantasound" recordings of all the classical pieces used in the film, which were performed by Leopold Stokowski and the Philadelphia Orchestra.

== See also ==
- List of American films of 1940
- 1940 in literature
- 1940 in music
- 1965 in literature and 1985 in literature for deaths of writers
- Public Domain Day
- Creative Commons
