= Afable Building =

Building in Manila, Philippines

Coordinates: 14.605068°N 120.987764°E

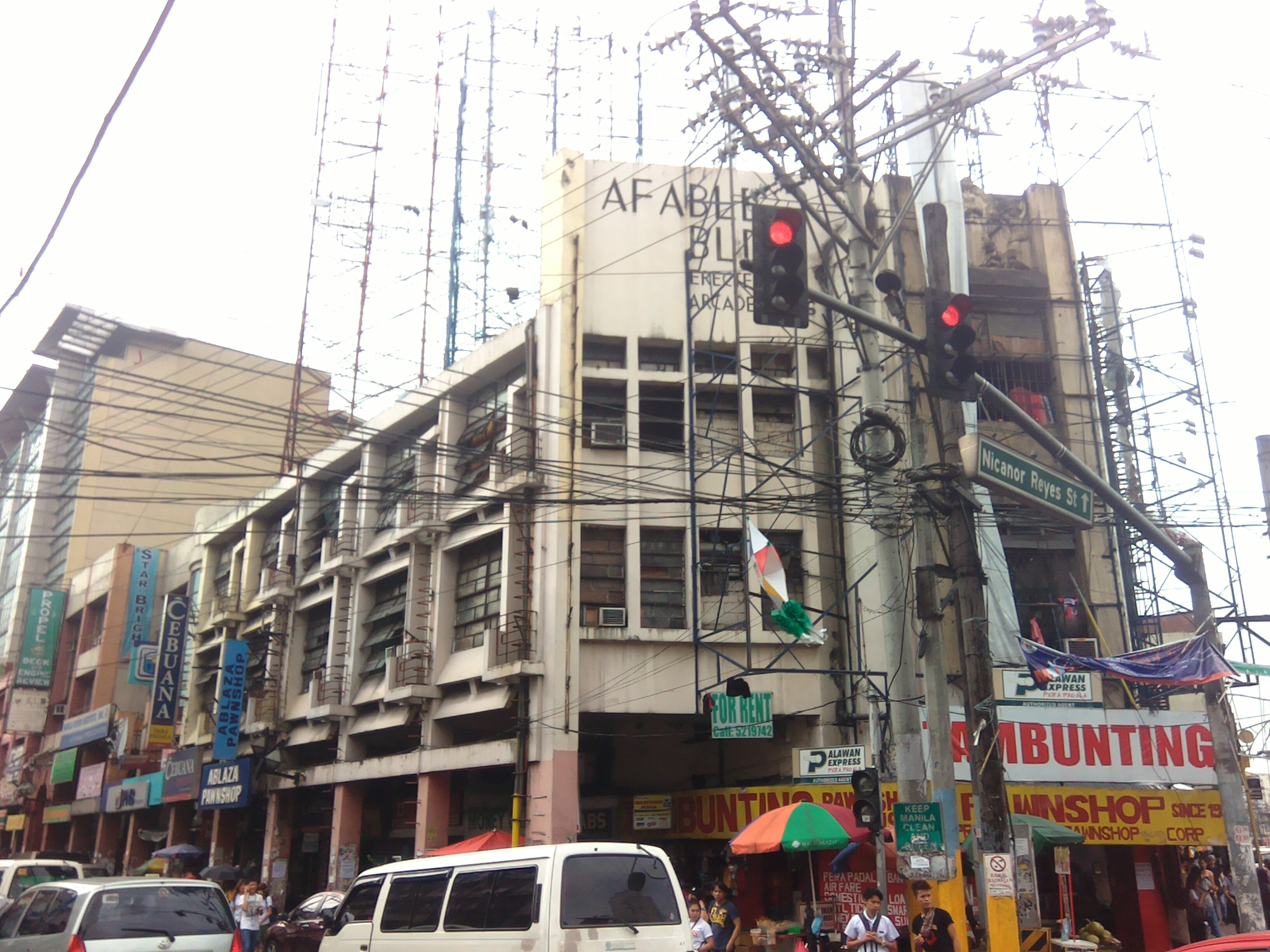
- Façade of the Afable Building in 2015
- Interactive map of the Afable Building area
- Alternative names: Afable College of Medicine and Surgery

General information
- Status: Dormitory and Retail
- Architectural style: Art Deco
- Location: Sampaloc, 117, C.Lerma st., Manila, Philippines
- Construction started: 1931

Technical details
- Material: Cement, Bricks, and Wood
- Floor count: 3
- Floor area: 370.9 square metres (3,992 sq ft)

Design and construction
- Architect: Pablo Antonio

The Afable building is a 3-storey structure in Manila. It is located on a trapezoidal lot at the corner of Nicanor Reyes st. (previously Morayta st.) and Lerma St. facing España Boulevard. The building possesses a façade both from its original design in 1932 (Lerma side) and the post war renovation in 1960 (Nicanor Reyes side) both designed by Filipino architect Pablo Antonio Sr. who is well known for Art Deco and later on became a National Artist in Architecture in 1976.

It is possibly the oldest still standing work of Pablo Antonio Sr. as of 2016.

== History ==
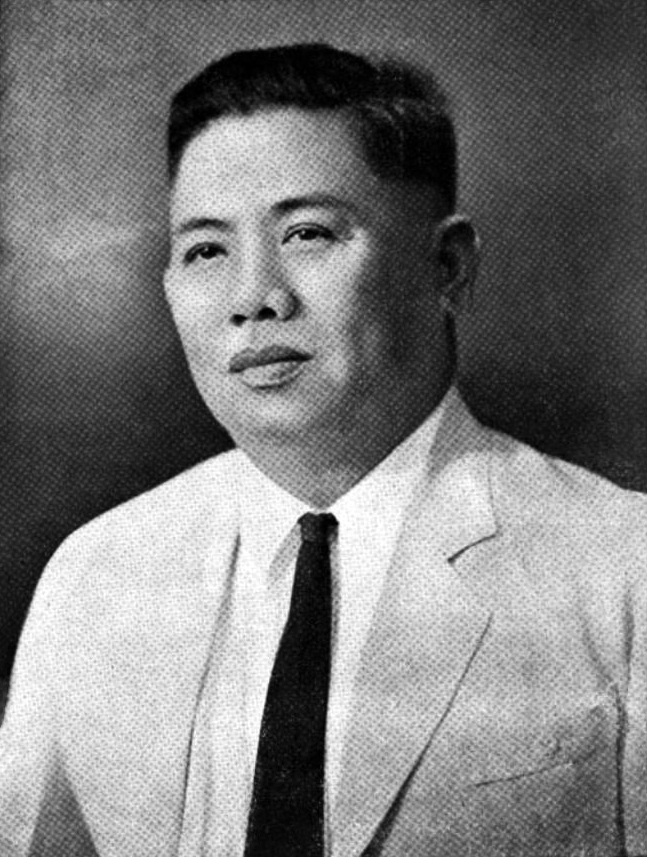
Valentín Afable

The construction of the Afable building started in 1931-1932 as the Afable of College and Medicine and Surgery that was reported to be located at Espana and Morayta (Nicanor Reyes) streets. In 1934-35, its affiliated hospital, the "Manila City Hospital of Dr. V. Afable" was built; also by designed Pablo Antonio Sr. Both buildings were named in honor of Dr. Valentin Afable, a notable physician, Lone district representative of Zambales (1938-1946), and founder of said college.

At the beginning of 1940 there were 4909 licensed physicians in the Philippines or one physician for every 3216 inhabitants. About 90 percent of them were Filipinos and great majority were graduates of local medical colleges, of which there were four. The College of Medicine and Surgery of University of Santo Tomas, College of Medicine and the Graduate School of Hygiene and Public Health of University of the Philippines, and the Afable College of Medicine

At some point after World War II, the college could no longer sustain itself. Manila Central University acquired the facilities of the Manila City Hospital and the Afable College of Medicine and Surgery at 1947 for their Medicine and Nursing colleges.

== Architectural details ==
Based on old photographs and amateur observations, the previous pre-war Afable was symmetrical both having exits facing Espana and Morayta st, an overhang with a classical cornice design supported each by a single cylindrical column. Overlapping flat slabs at the rear and sides. Post war renovations removed it of its symmetry. Instead an arcade of art deco design opening that side with multiple windows and spiral-like grills at each balcony.

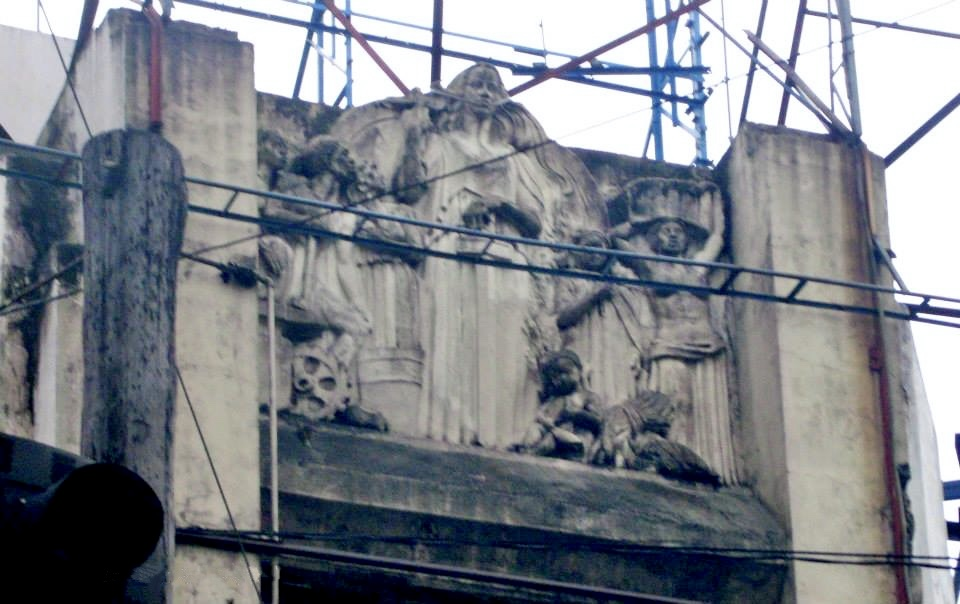
Afable Building Facade Sculptures

The facade shows an inscription to when it was built and when the arcade was added. What is interesting to notice is the small bass-relief crowning the facade which shows 6 humanoid figures

- Left: A muscular male holding a hammer near an anvil and cogwheel facing towards the tall female figure.
- Middle: A tall female similar to Lady Justice holding a large sword on her left hand and a rod of hermes on the right. Beside her are two smaller figures wearing the same cloth.
- Right: A female balancing to what appears to be a basket near piles of hay and a young figure sitting which could be her child.

It is possible that this bass-relief could be the work of Italian sculptor Francesco Monti, considering some of Pablo Antonio's buildings have Monti's work Incorporated in them. Examples are the White Cross Orphanage building and the Administration building of Far Eastern University Manila.

== Post-war ==
In 1956 the Afable building was renovated by same architect Pablo Antonio Sr. with an arcade facing Morayta st (Nicanor Reyes st), completed in 1960 into a modern post-war Art deco structure. The renovation altered the building's symmetrical design to what the present structure looks like today. The intention of the renovation is still unknown. A part of the annex was demolished sometime in 1970s.

=== Current status ===
The Afable building today is not well maintained and functions as a mixed-use retail at the ground floor while most of the remaining floors are part of the Louella Dormitory. Much of the interiors have been modified to fit its current use and the only areas left original are the exterior architectural details, metal railings, windows, and others that have not been overrun by gross alterations.

== See also ==
- Pablo Antonio
