= Carmentea =

Song by Luis Ariel Rey
- Genre: Joropo
- Songwriter(s): Miguel Ángel Martín

"Carmentea" is a Colombian song in the joropo genre written by Miguel Ángel Martín. It was popularized through a recording by Luis Ariel Rey. The song became an anthem of llanero folklore.

In its list of the 50 best Colombian songs of all time, El Tiempo, Colombia's most widely circulated newspaper, ranked the version of the song by Luis Ariel Rey at No. 27. Viva Music Colombia rated the song No. 26 on its list of the 100 most important Colombian songs of all time.
