= Son et lumière (show) =

Sound and light show

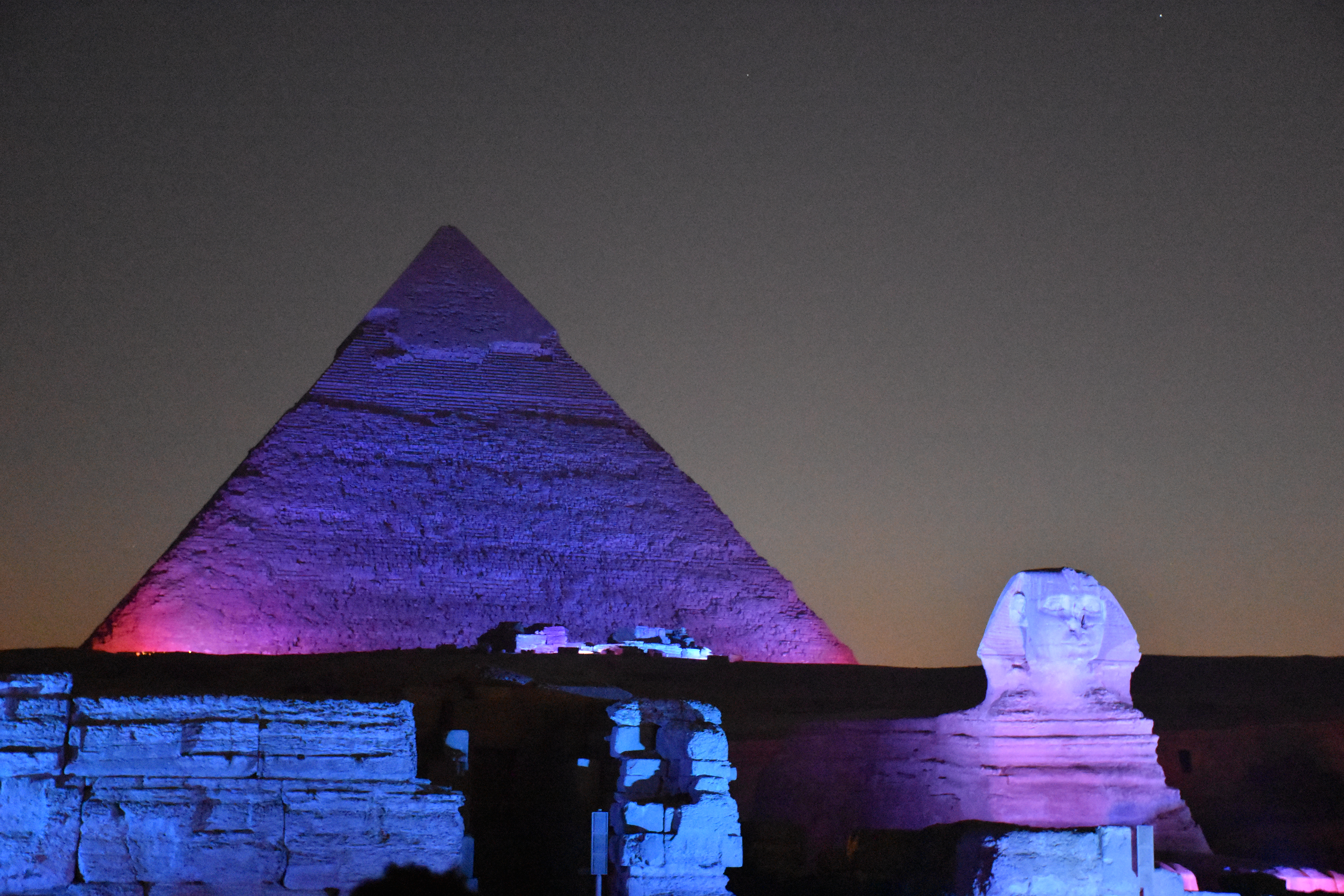
Sound and light show at Giza, Egypt

Son et lumière (French pronunciation: [sɔ̃n e lymjɛʁ] (French, lit. "sound and light")), or a sound and light show, is a form of nighttime entertainment that is usually presented in an outdoor venue of historic significance.

Special lighting effects are projected onto the façade of a building or ruin and synchronized with recorded or live narration and music to dramatize the history of the place. The invention of the concept is credited to Paul Robert-Houdin, who was the curator of the Château de Chambord in France, which hosted the world's first son et lumière in 1952. Another was established in the early 1960s at the site of the Great Pyramid of Giza in Egypt.

This nighttime medium is used for ecclesiastical buildings, stately homes and ruins, and has become popular in France where about 50 annual productions take place, principally in the Loire Valley, at the Palace of Versailles and at Les Invalides in Paris.

The format usually involves no active participation by actors but a recorded narrative of the history of the building concerned by one or a cast of voices. To this is added music or sound effects as appropriate, all of which is synchronised to lighting and/or projection effects which provide the visual dimension. Pyrotechnic effects are occasionally included for added spectacle.

A relatively recent variation is that, rather than the music and narration coming through a concert-like sound system, they may use headsets, such as in Philadelphia, Pennsylvania's "Lights of Liberty". This allows an audience to move through a historic district as the show proceeds.

== Performances around the world ==
Video of a son et lumière show at Supertree Grove in Singapore

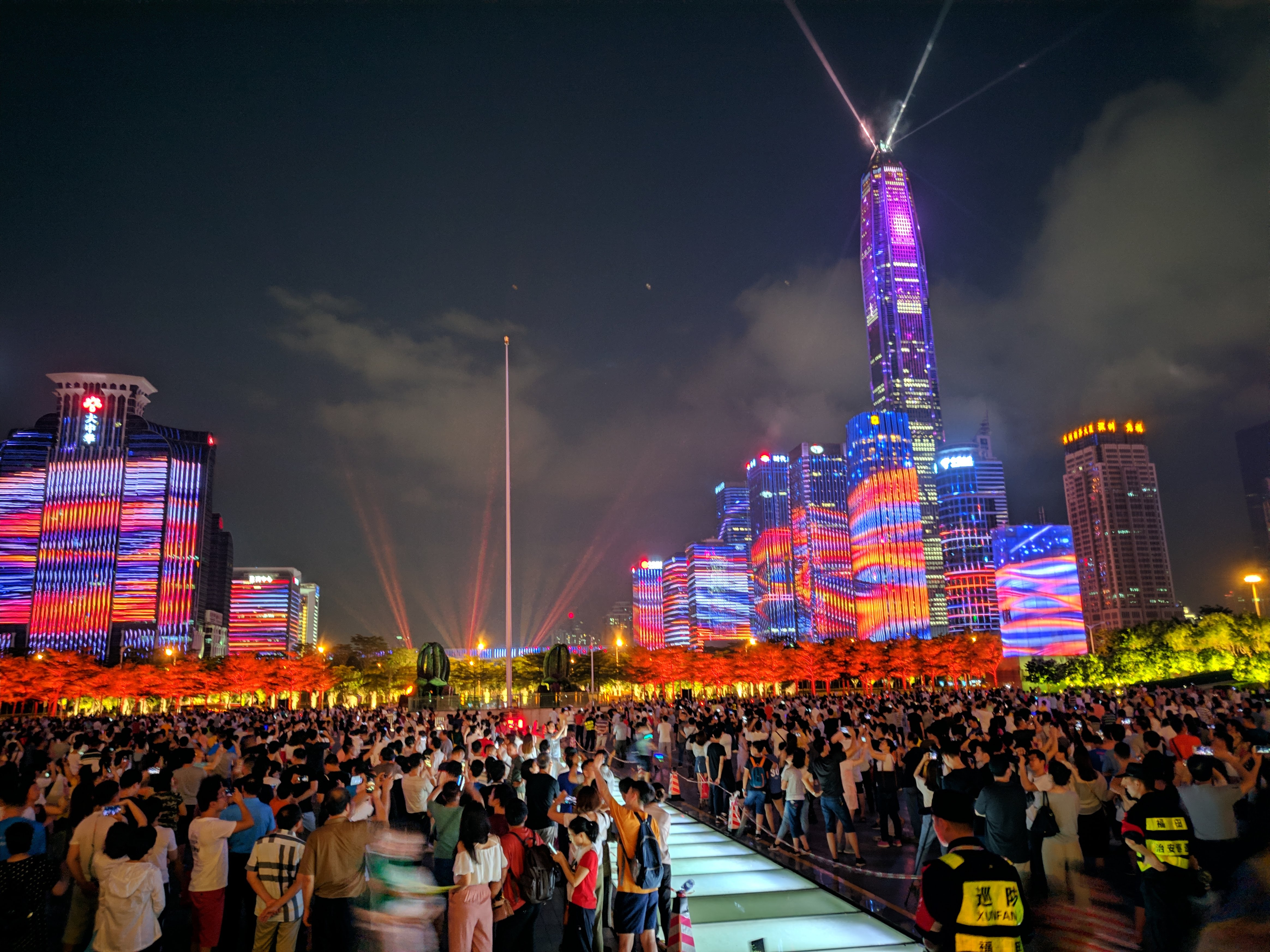
Synchronized light show in Shenzhen's central urban area

Composers who have produced son et lumière shows include Jacqueline Nova and Halim El-Dabh. French electronic music composer Jean Michel Jarre has incorporated son et lumière productions into his live concerts, which often take place outdoors at historical sites, sometimes with more than one million spectators.

=== Europe ===
In France, son et lumière shows are performed in and around France's historical châteaux. In neighboring Luxembourg, a son et lumière event took place in 2007 at the Chateau de Septfontaines.

In Britain, where the majority of such productions have been staged at churches, cathedrals and abbeys, indoor presentations are frequently preferred, particularly as architectural gems might otherwise not be shown to best advantage. The first British production was at Greenwich Palace in south London in 1957. In England in particular, where son et lumière is as well received as it is in France, many of the nations's principal historic houses and church buildings have enjoyed such a production. Canterbury Cathedral in England featured a son et lumière in 1965, produced as part of a European "Cathedrales en Lumière" series events, and in 2005, along with Rochester Cathedral and Castle as part of the European "Cathedrales en Lumière" project. Other UK locations include St Augustine's Abbey, St. George's Hall, Liverpool, Tewkesbury Abbey, St Paul's Cathedral, Hampton Court Palace, and at Chartwell, the country home of Winston Churchill. Part of the London 2012 Olympic bid involved the use of son et lumière inspired light projections of athletes upon various London buildings.

Shows have alo been mounted at the Forum in Rome and at the Parthenon in Athens.

=== Americas ===
In the United States, the first such presentation took place at Independence Hall in Philadelphia in 1962. Another presentation took place at George Washington's Mount Vernon in May 1976 as France's bicentennial gift to the United States. The opening performance was attended by French President Giscard d'Estaing and American President Gerald Ford.

In Canada, the National Capital Commission has sponsored a sound and light show on Parliament Hill in Ottawa every year since 1984, from early July to mid-September.

In Peru, a son et lumière show opened in the Park of the Reserve, Lima in 2007, called "Circuito Mágico del Agua" (magic water circuit), which holds the Guinness World Record as the world's largest water source exposed in a public park.

=== Africa ===
The first African production was at the Pyramids of Giza at Cairo, Egypt, in 1961, while the first in Asia was the Red Fort in Delhi, India in 1965 by the India Tourism Development Corporation.

=== Asia ===
In Israel, a son et lumière production is presented both at the Tower of David in the Citadel of the Old City of Jerusalem, and at the desert butte of Masada.

On December 31, 2017, the Burj Khalifa used an LED lighting system to present Light Up Dubai, a multimedia show that served as its New Year's countdown in lieu of a fireworks show (which had been one of the most expensive fireworks displays in the world). It set a record for the largest light and sound show displayed on a single building; for 2018-19, the show was supplemented by the return of its fireworks.

In India, popular shows are at Red Fort, Amer Fort, Khajuraho, Akbari Quila, Ajmer, Jantar Mantar, Jaipur, Purana Qila, Delhi, and Golconda Fort. Most of these shows highlight historic tapestry of the place.

=== Australia ===
In Australia, Blood Under the Southern Cross, shown at Sovereign Hill in Ballarat since 1992, depicts the events of the 1854 Eureka Rebellion.

== See also ==
- Projection mapping
- Media related to Sound and light shows at Wikimedia Commons
