= ACVV =

Woman's movement in South Africa

The ACVV, formerly known as the Afrikaanse Christelike Vrouevereniging (English translation: Afrikaans Christian Women's Association) is a multicultural woman's welfare organisation in South Africa, founded in 1904. It is the oldest welfare organisation in South Africa, started to provide aid to people who were affected by the Anglo Boer War.

It initially was Afrikaner-centred and conservative. Women's organizations like the ACVV extended their operations beyond the realm of the home and became involved in Afrikaner education, identity and inevitably, politics.

The modern ACVV is multicultural, and the website carries the motto "Together in the Service of the Community" in Afrikaans, Xhosa language Sikunye kwiinkonzo zoluntu, English and Setswana language Re mmogo mo ditirelong tsa loago. It states that it is "people-centered and committed to a democratic structure that allows the input of the community. " There are now about 115 branches throughout South Africa, having provided assistance in emergencies, primary healthcare, and education, growing to social work, including assistance to children and older people.
