= Maria Elizabeth Rothmann =

South African writer (1875–1975)

- Born: Maria Elizabeth Charlotte Rothmann; 28 August 1875; Swellendam, Cape Colony
- Died: 7 September 1975 (aged 100); Swellendam, Cape Province
- Education: BA
- Alma mater: South African College
- Occupation: Writer
- Spouse: Herbert Charles Gordon Oakshott (m. 1902; div. 1911)
- Children: Jacobus Rothmann (James) Oakshott (1903); Anna Wilhelmina Rothmann/Oakshott (1904)
- Writing career
- Pen name: M.E.R.
- Language: Afrikaans
- Genre: Afrikaans literature

Maria Elizabeth Rothmann, penname M.E.R. (28 August 1875 – 7 September 1975) was an Afrikaans writer, and co-founder of the Voortrekkers youth movement. Her unique contribution to Afrikaans literature was an ethical didactic, cultural historic review of a bygone Afrikaans society.

== Biography ==
She was born Maria Elizabeth Rothmann in Swellendam, in the then Cape Colony. She was one of the first South African women to attend a university. She acquired a B.A.-degree at the South African College (now UCT) in Cape Town. At the age of 22 she started working as a teacher, first in Johannesburg, later in Grahamstown and eventually at Swellendam. On 18 September 1902, while in Grahamstown, she married Herbert Charles Gordon Oakshott, a school principal. From this marriage James Rothmann (later Jacobus or Koos) was born in 1903, and Anna in 1904. The couple reached a divorce on 4 July 1911. MER then kept her maidenname. Anna Rothmann was also a writer.

M.E.R.'s writing career started in 1918 in the Lowveld. She became involved with journalism – first at Die Boerevrou (1920 to 1922) in Pretoria, and afterwards at Die Burger (1922 to 1928) in Cape Town. She became the first woman editor of the latter. In 1928, she was appointed the organizing secretary of the A.C.V.V. She traveled the country in this capacity while investigating the question of poor whites.

In 1929, she was a co-founder of the Voortrekkers youth movement and afterwards also vice-chairperson of the Cape Province's National Party. She also served on the Carnegie Commission. In 1938, she was awarded a Carnegie grant which she used to visit the US.

She received the Hertzog Prize in 1953 for her oeuvre of prose. In 1961, she received the Scheepersprys vir Jeugliteratuur for Die tweeling trek saam (The twins join the Trek). In 1970, she received the Tienie Holloway-medalje vir Kleuterliteratuur for Karlien en Kandas (Karlien and Kandas).

She received two honorary doctorate degrees, one from the University of Cape Town in 1951 and another from the University of South Africa in 1973; inter alia for her contributions to social work. She died ten days after her 100th birthday, at her home Kom nader (Come hither) in Swellendam.

== Bibliography ==
Note: The English titles given here are translated from Afrikaans, and are not available as such.

- Kinders van die Voortrek (Children of the Voortrek) – 1920
- Die Sokka-boek: stories van 'n skaaphond (The Sokka book: stories of a sheep dog) – 1926
- Vanmelewe: stories van die voorouers (Times past: stories of the forebears) – 1926
- Onweershoogte en ander verhale (Stormy heights and other stories) – 1927
- Die kammalanders (Denizens of Kammaland) – 1928
- Die oorwinnaar: verhale van President Steyn (The victor: stories of President Steyn) collected by M.E.R. – 1929
- Jong dae: 'n meisies-storie (Young days: a girls story) – 1933
- Sokka se plaas (Sokka's farm) – 1933
- Na vaste gange (Towards firm corridors) – 1944
- Drie vertellings (Three narratives) – 1944
- Uit en tuis (Home and away) – 1946
- Stoute bengel: 'n verhaal uit die lewe (Wayward boy: a story from life) – 1947
- Die eindelose waagstuk (The endless wager) – 1948
- Die gewers (The givers) – 1950
- Goedgeluk (Fortuity) – 1958
- The drostdy at Swellendam (The Drostdy at Swellendam), with A. Rothmann—1960
- Die tweeling trek saam (The twins join the Trek) – 1960
- Kom nader; bloemlesing uit die werk van M.E.R. (Come hither; anthology from the work of M.E.R.) – 1965
- So is onse maniere (Thus are our customs) – 1965
- Vroue wat Jesus geken het (The women who knew Jesus) – 1965
- Karlien en Kandas (Karlien and Kandas) – 1969
- My beskeie deel; 'n outobiografiese vertelling (My humble share; an autobiographical narrative) – 1972
- Familiegesprek: briewe aan haar dogter (Family conversation: letters to her daughter) – 1976
- Van naby gesien: ’n keur uit die kortkuns van M.E.R. (Seen from nearby: a choice selection from the short stories of M.E.R.), compiled by Elize Botha) – 1976
- 'n Kosbare erfenis: briewe 1916–1975 (A treasured inheritance: letters 1916–1975) compiled by Alba Bouwer, Anna Rothmann and Rykie van Reenen—1977
- M.E.R.-versebundel (M.E.R. poem volume), compiled by Carl Lohann, music by Awie van Wyk, illustrations by Ina Pfeiffer—1985

She translated the following works from Dutch to Afrikaans:

- Tant Alie van Transvaal: die dagboek van Alie Badenhorst (Aunt Alie of Transvaal: the diary of Alie Badenhorst) – 1939
- Oorlogsdagboek van ’n Transvaalse burger te velde 1900 — 1901 (War diary of a Transvaal citizen in the field 1900 — 1901), a candid diary of her brother Fritz Rothmann—1976

== Sources ==
- Gerard, A.S. (1986). European-language Writing in Sub-Saharan Africa. Comparative History of Literatures in European Languages. John Benjamins Publishing Company. ISBN 978-90-272-7468-7.
- du Plessis Scholtz, Johannes (1979). "6". Oor Skilders en Skrywers (in Afrikaans). Cape Town: Tafelberg publishers.
- Rothmann, M.E. (1973). My beskeie deel: 'n Outobiografiese vertelling (in Afrikaans). Cape Town: Tafelberg publishers.
- Steyn, J.C. (2004). Die 100 jaar van MER (in Afrikaans). Cape Town: Tafelberg Publishers. ISBN 9780624042198.
