= Park Su-geun =

South Korean painter (1914–1965)

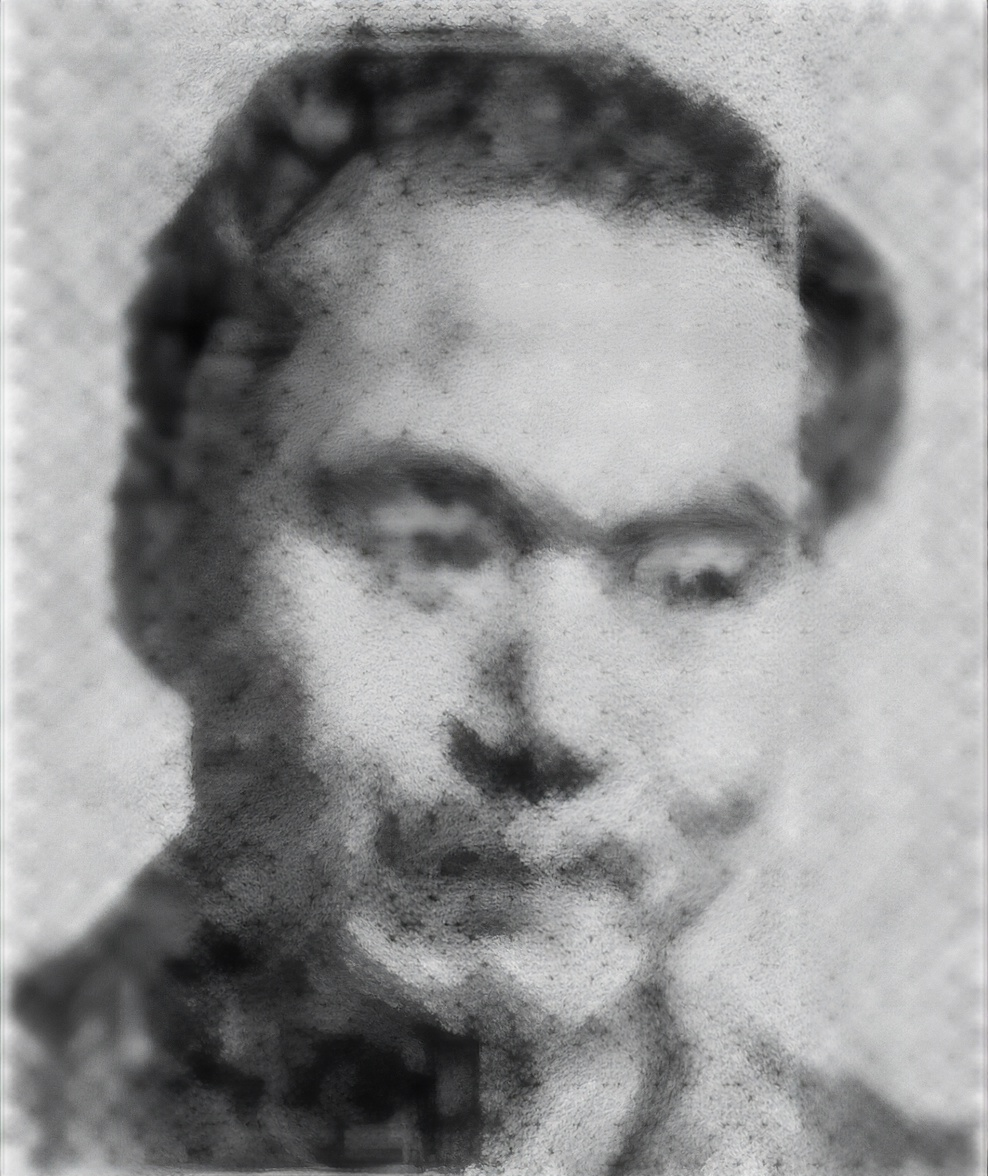
- Born: February 21, 1914; Yanggu County, Kōgen-dō, Korea, Empire of Japan
- Died: May 6, 1965 (aged 51); Seoul, South Korea
- Occupation: Painter

Korean name
- Hangul: 박수근
- Hanja: 朴壽根
- RR: Bak Sugeun
- MR: Pak Sugŭn

Park Su-geun (Korean: 박수근; Hanja: 朴壽根; February 21, 1914 – May 6, 1965), name also transliterated as Park Soo-keun, was a South Korean painter known for his depictions of daily life in rural Korea. He was one of the very few Korean artists active during the colonial and post-war period who had no official art education. As a self-taught artist, Park Su-geun formulated a unique painting style using textured surfaces, geometric shapes, bold lines, and muted colours.

== Early life and career ==
Park Su-geun was born in Yanggu County, Kōgen-dō, Korea, Empire of Japan. Park graduated Yanggu Public School (양구공립보통학교), after which he had to learn to learn to paint without official training or further education due to financial difficulties. However, with the help of his teachers such as O Deuk-yeong (오득영; 吳得泳, 1904–1991) and Shimizu Kiyoshi (靑水靑), Ishiguro Yoshiyasu (石黑義保, 1890–1977), Hara Takeo (原竹男), he was able to continue to study painting.

He is known to have been inspired to seek a career as an artist after he came across a coloured print of Jean François Millet’s "L’Angelus." In 1932, he made his debut in painting circles with his work titled "Spring Comes" (봄이 오다) which was awarded a prize in the 11th annual Chōsen Art Exhibition. He moved to Chuncheon in 1935 and received help from O Deuk-yeong and Miyoshi Iwakichi (三吉岩吉), and went on to win prizes in the Joseon Arts Exhibition eight times from 1936 to 1944. In 1939, Park Su-geun married Kim Bok-sun (김복순, 金福順, 1922–1979), who would later be the model of many of his paintings of women.

== Pyongyang Period ==
Park Su-geun moved to Pyongyang in 1940 to work as a clerk for the provincial government of Heian'nan-dō, with the help of Miyoshi. He continued to paint while working in Pyongyang and became a member of artists’ group Johohoe (주호회; 珠壺會) from 1940 to 1944 and participated in group exhibitions. During his stay in Pyongyang, he submitted key works of art such as "Woman Grinding Beans" (맷돌질하는 여인, 1940), "Woman Washing Clothes" (망질하는 여인, 1941), "Mother and Child" (모자, 母子, 1942), and "Woman Doing Needlework" (실을 뽑는 여인, 1943) to the Joseon Arts Exhibition Park’s wife became the model for these paintings of ordinary women at their daily chores.

It is in the 1940s that Park Su-geun developed his unique use of stone-like paint surfaces, of which he found inspiration from ancient Korean stone pagodas and Buddha sculptures.

Park Su-geun also experimented with print during his stay at Pyongyang and from his affiliation with Juhohoe.

== Seoul Period ==
During the Korean War, Park Su-geun moved from Pyongyang to Seoul alone in 1950 and was later joined by his family in 1952. Many of his earlier works from Chuncheon and Pyongyang, as well as those produced during fleeing throughout the Korean War were lost or destroyed when he defected to South Korea, leaving his paintings behind in North Korea. However, his artistic style of using geometric and flat shapes and simple lines in depicting familiar and realistic scenes of peasant life had already been established at this point, and Park Su-geun readdressed many of his prior works and further developed them after the war.

Financial hardship continued in Seoul, but Park Su-geun was able to make a living by drawing portraits for American soldiers stationed in Seoul.

In 1953, Park Su-geun won first prize in the 2nd annual Republic of Korea Art Exhibition with "House" (집), after which he painted full-time as an artist.

Park Su-geun became a member of Daehan Art Association (Daehan Misul Hyeophoe, 대한미술협회, 大韓美術協會) from 1955 and participated in their annual exhibitions until 1960. Park was also a founding member of Korea Woodblock Printing Association (Hanguk Panhwa Hyeophoe, 한국판화협회, 韓國版畵協會) in 1958, and submitted a woodblock print piece, "Old Man and Woman" (노인과 여인) in the first annual group exhibition of the club. He also participated in a group exhibition in 1960 as a founding member of Hyeondae Panhwa Dong-in (현대판화동인; 現代版畫同人), alongside Kim Whanki, Choi Yeong-rim (최영림, 崔榮林), Yu Gang-ryeol (유강렬, 劉康烈), and Jeong Gyu (정규, 鄭圭). In 1959, he got became a Recommended Artist of the National Art Exhibition and served on the judging committee in 1962.

Park Su-geun also submitted oil paintings for group exhibitions abroad, including in Hong Kong and in San Francisco Museum in 1957, and in New York World House Gallery in 1958. He received help in selling his works and participating in exhibitions abroad from an American journalist, Margaret G. Miller, to whom he left numerous letters regarding the sales of his paintings, financial situations, and his daily life.

Despite the popularity and recognition of his paintings abroad, Park Su-geun’s paintings were often rejected in major Korean exhibitions, much to the artist’s disappointment. He refused to submit works to the Republic of Korea Art Exhibition after "Three Women" (세 여인) failed to win a prize in the 1957 exhibition, but was soon appointed as Recommended Artist by the Gukjeon committee in 1959 and subsequently submitted works "Spring" (봄), "Woman Resting" (휴녀), "Old Man and Playing Children" (노인과 유동).

== Artistic Style ==
Throughout his career, Park Su-geun retained his conviction to portray ordinary, humble people and to capture mundane yet truthful scenes of familial life, especially the lifestyle that he had personally experienced in rural, agricultural Korea. Park also liked to paint daily lives of women and trees. Some typical works including women and trees are "Woman Pounding Grain" (절구질하는 여인, 1952), "A Wash Place" (빨래터,1954), "Returning Home" (귀가, 1962), and "Old Tree and Woman" (고목과 여인, 1964). Many of his trees are shown bare, twisted, and brittle. The use of trees in his paintings are thought to be both reflections of contemporary social climate and hope and belief in the resilience of the tree in surviving hardship. Peasant women that most frequently appear were often modelled on his wife who often took on the task of making a living and taking care of daily chores From the lack of distinct facial features and humility in their dress and poses, it can be seen that Park Su-geun reflected his own romantic interpretations of strong and diligent women during times of national hardship and suffering.

Park Su-geun predominantly used unique, granite-like surface textures and light gray or brown tones to depict simple Korean local scenes and daily lives of ordinary Korean people, using the "matière technique" (마티에르 기법). The merging of his Cubist painting style with the "matière technique" that derived from Art Informel practices that emphasised matter and abstraction resulted in a unique image from the 1950s. He used both brushes and knives to handle oil paint that had been filtered to reduce the amount of oil and achieved a rough texture that resembled "carved reliefs." On this surface, he applied thick, bold lines to depict simple forms. His focus on subjects of naïveté and geometric, flattened, and simplified painting style was strengthened from the late 1950s, and his paintings reflected architectural inspirations as he experimented with the juxtaposition of flat, contrasting shapes and forms in formulating his spatial compositions. Most of his later works are devoid of realistic backgrounds and perspective.

Park also produced prints, watercolors, drawings, and illustrations throughout his career.

While Park Su-geun's themes and subjects of painting were of the common and ordinary, his artistic creativity and contribution to modern Korean art history is thought to be unique, especially as many other contemporary artists were experimenting with and even imitating Western subjects and styles of painting.

== Later life and death ==
Despite his lifelong active production of artworks and relatively consistent sales toward the later period of his career, Park Su-geun neither owned his own studio nor was able to make a comfortable living from painting. In 1963, Park lost his sight in his left eye due to a cataract, and died of liver cirrhosis at the age of 51 in 1965. For much of his life Park struggled with poverty and hardship, but in 1980, he was posthumously awarded Eun-gwan Jang (은관장, 銀冠章, Silver Medal) of Order of Cultural Merit (문화훈장; 文化勳章).

A memorial solo exhibition of Park Su-geun was held in October 1965 at the Korean Information Service Gallery (중앙공보관) after his death.

His work is housed in numerous institutions around the world, including the University of Michigan Museum of Art and the USC Pacific Asia Museum.

Park Su-geun Museum was established in 2002 at Park’s birthplace, Yanggu.
