= Life Theater =

Building and former cinema in Manila, Philippines

T. Villonco Building
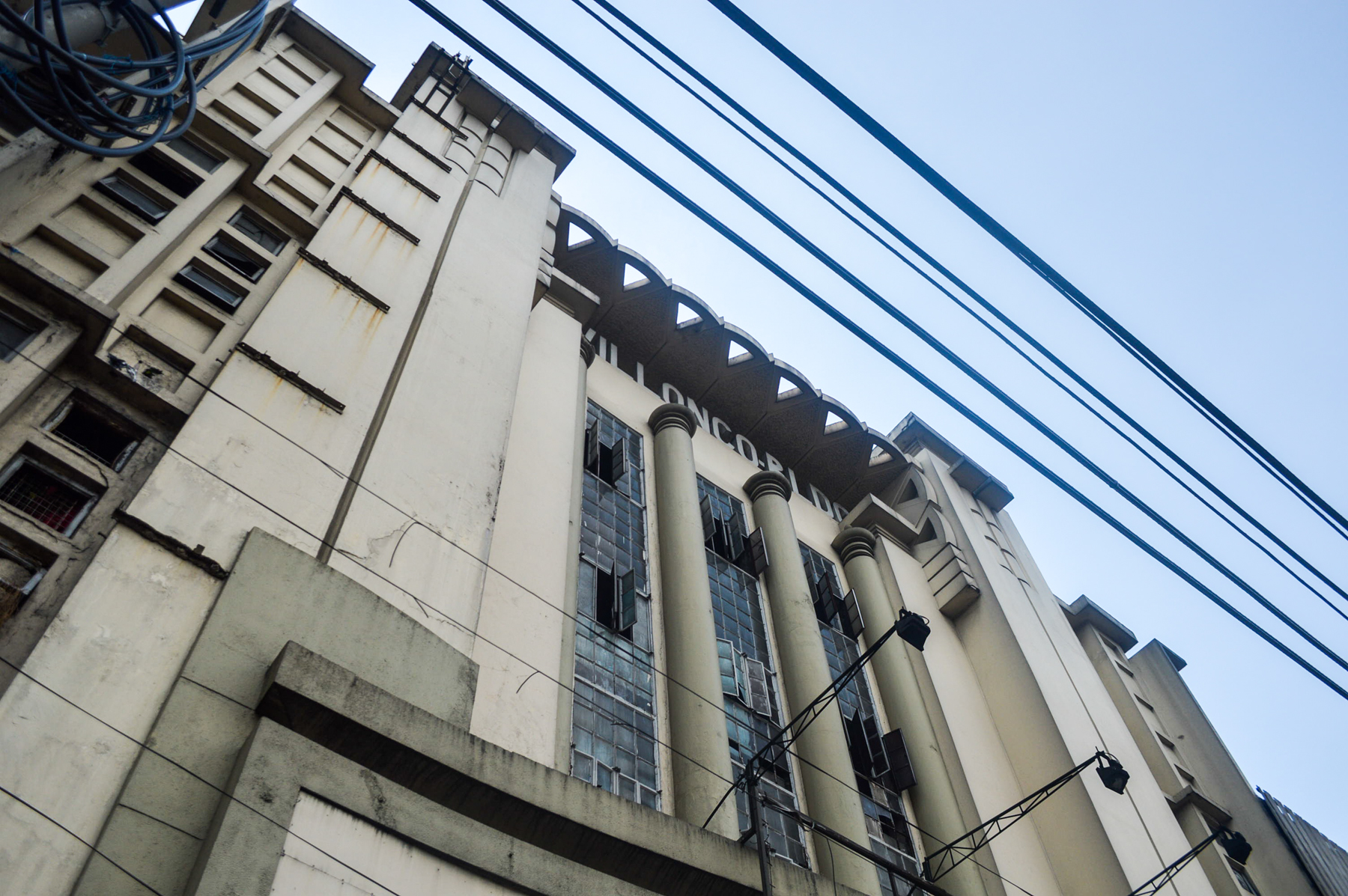
- The theater in 2014
- Former names: Life Theater

General information
- Status: Completed
- Architectural style: Art Deco
- Location: 533 Quezon Boulevard, Quiapo, Manila, Philippines
- Coordinates: 14°36′00″N 120°59′03″E
- Named for: Dr. Teofilo Villonco
- Completed: 1941
- Renovated: 1946
- Demolished: 2017–2018
- Owner: Remy Villonco

Design and construction
- Architect: Pablo S. Antonio, Sr.

The Life Theater, which was later known as the Teofilo Villonco Building, was an Art Deco movie theater located on 533 Quezon Boulevard, Quiapo, Manila. It was designed by architect Pablo S. Antonio Sr.. During its operational years as a movie theater, the Life Theater was reserved for blockbuster movies due to its large audience capacity and air conditioning system. The T. Villonco Building is owned by Remy Villonco of Malabon, son of Dr. Teofilo Villonco, whose family is involved in the theater industry.

The auditorium was demolished from April–June 2017, and then, the rest of the building was demolished by 2018 for the construction of Infinity Square by Foinix Realty, Inc., a 27-storey Commercial building. Its facade was left intact and will be incorporated into the design of the new high-rise building.

== History ==
Erected in 1941, Life Theater was designed in Art Deco style. The theater was meant to show only Tagalog films. Ang Maestra, where Rosa del Rosario and Rogelio dela Rosa starred, was the first movie showed upon the theater's opening. The theater was destroyed following the aftermath of World War II. It was rebuilt in 1946 with an upgraded seating capacity of 1,144. The Hollywood film, A Thousand and One Nights was the first movie showed when the theater reopened. The theater continued to feature several films, both in English and Tagalog until the mid-1950s when Sampaguita Pictures took over the theater.

The Life Theater was owned by Romeo Villonco, who continued his father, Dr. Teofilo Villonco's enterprise. The Palace Theater located along Ronquillo Street in Quiapo was owned by the Villoncos. The Villoncos, together with the De Leon and Navoa families originally ran LVN Pictures. The name of the film studio is an acronym which represents the three families (De Leon, Villonco and Navoa).

Premieres were held in this venue when movie stars were dressed by famous couturiers, sometimes dressed up the characters they were portrayed in the movie. The actors and actresses were transported to the theater by a new air-conditioned bus owned by Sampaguita Pictures causing heavy traffic build-up on nearby roads.

=== Current use ===
The theater shut down in the 1990s when moviegoers began shifting to malls for shopping and entertainment pleasures. It now houses booths selling cheap goods. As of June 2018, the building is condemned and has barricades on it for demolition despite a heritage building. Rumors are that a mall is about to be built in that location with the theater intact together with it.

== Architecture ==
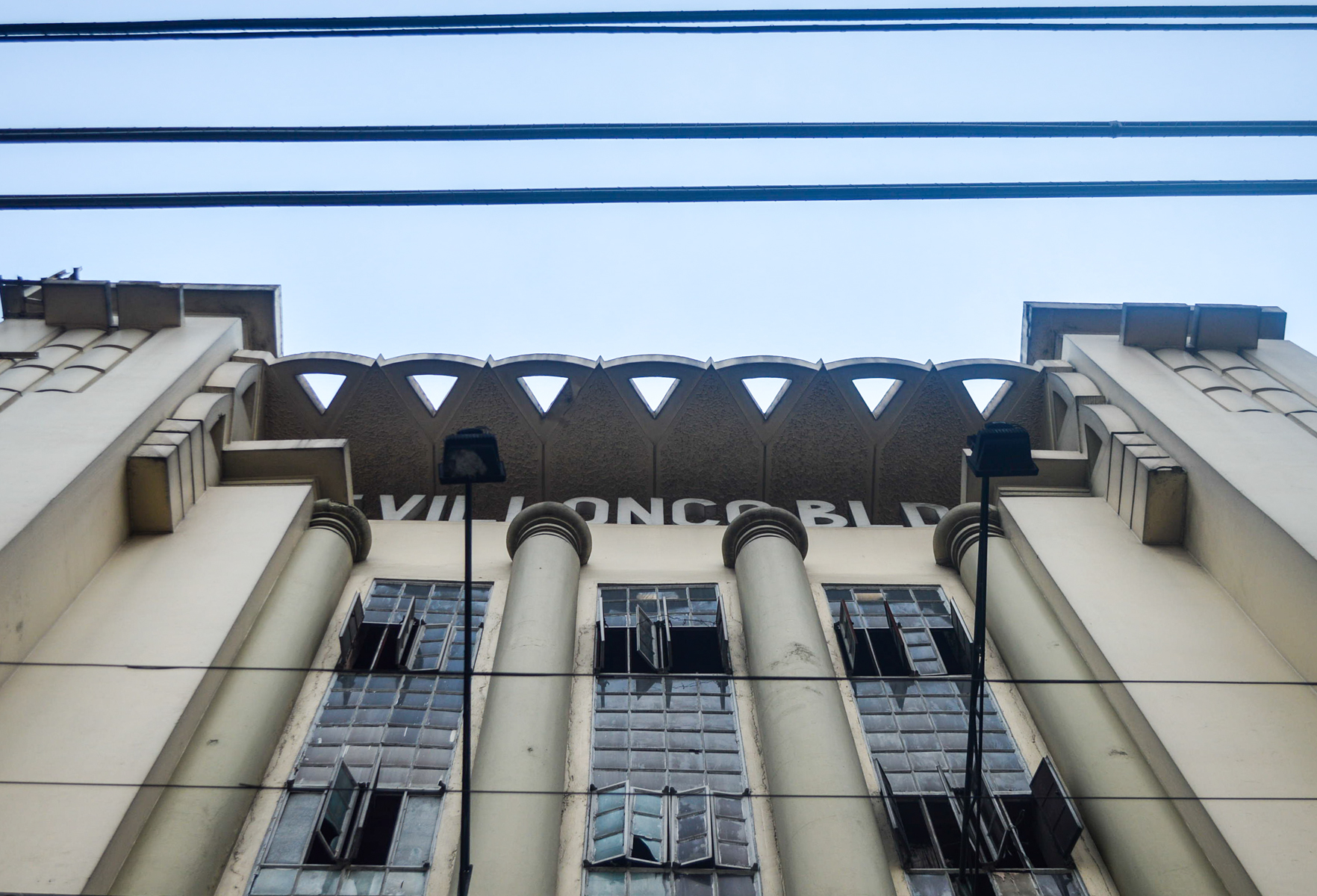
Facade of the theater in 2014

The white facade of the theater contains both elements of Art Deco and neoclassical architecture due to the building's streamlining and scaled round columns, each adorned with a conical finial. The theater was also adorned with aluminum buffles, consistent with its Art Deco design. Along with the Times Theater, the theater is found along Quezon Boulevard in Quiapo. It has since been converted to a shopping center.
