= Jacqueline Nova =

Colombian musician and author

Jacqueline Nova Sondag (1935–1975) was a Colombian musician, author and composer. She is often cited as having initiated Colombia's electroacoustic musical practices.

== Life ==
Jacqueline Nova Sondag was born on 6 January 1935, in Ghent, Belgium. Her father was visiting Belgium from Bucaramanga, Colombia, to study to be an engineer, where he met Jacqueline's mother. Upon his finishing his studies, Nova's family moved back to Bucaramanga where she spent her childhood. In 1955 she moved to Bogotá. Nova's mid-high social class in 20th-century Colombia traditionally prescribed that women learn to play either piano, guitar, or sing in order to be considered respectable ladies. Nova began learning piano when she was seven.

In 1958 was admitted to the National Conservatory of Music National University for piano. She appeared in performances at the Conservatory as a soloist and accompanist. She studied under Fabio González Zuleta and with Blas Emilio Atehortua for contemporary music. In 1967 she was the first woman composer to graduate with a Masters from the conservatory.

She then traveled to Buenos Aires on a scholarship from the Instituto Torcuato Di Tella for further studies in composition at Centro Latinoamericano de Altos Estudios. There she studied with Luigi Nono, Alberto Ginastera, Gerardo Gandini, Francisco Kröpfl, Francisco Zumaque and others.

Nova died on 13 June 1975 in Bogotá from bone cancer.

== Work ==
After studying at CLAEM, Nova became interested in interdisciplinary experimentation with unaccompanied tape. Collaborations with other fields such as visual arts, theatre, and cinema led to a large amount of experimental and graphic elements in her scores. Here she composed her first electroacoustic composition, called Opposition-Fusion (1968).

Nova's work has been played by orchestras such as the Venezuela Symphony Orchestra, the Symphony Orchestra of Colombia, and the Washington National Symphony Orchestra at venues such as the Latin American Music Festival and the Third Annual Symposium of American Music in Virginia, USA. Her works have been performed in Venezuela, Panama, Spain, Brazil, the United States, Argentina, Uruguay, the Dominican Republic, France, Germany, and Austria.

Nova's work has been issued through media including radio, books, periodicals, film, conferences and concerts. In 1970 she gave a lecture and concert for the Conference on Electronic Music at the Instituto Colombo-Alemán (Colombia-German Institute) as well as the V Music Festival in Medellín. She wrote "The Wonderful World of Machinery" for the magazine Bogota Nova No. 4 in 1966, and "Reasonable Orders Conscious and Unconscious" (1967) and "An Aberrant Phenomenon" (1969) for the newspaper El Espectador.

Between 1969 and 1970, Nova directed Asimetrías, a Radiodifusora Nacional radio series which presented 22 sessions of new music works and analysis. In 1970 she established the New Music Group to perform works by living composers, with special emphasis on Latin America, but because of her health, the ensemble had limited engagements.

== Awards and honors ==
- Festival de Música de Caracas Award for Chamber Orchestra 1966 for 12 Mobile
- Third prize in the Composition of the Colombian Institute of Culture 1977 for "Pitecanthropus" for symphony orchestra, voices and electronic sounds
- Posthumous recognition from the Colombian Institute of Culture

== Compositions ==
Nova composed for multiple genres including orchestra, chamber ensembles, and solo instruments. She also wrote works for popular theater and film soundtracks including Machu Picchu and Francisco Norden's film The Guerrilla Priest Camilo. She also composed for Son et lumière projects. Selected works include:

- Fantasy for piano
- Little Suite for string quartet
- Transitions for piano (1964-1965)
- Asymmetries for flute, cymbals, and tam-tams
- Opposition-Fusion for tape (1968)
- Echos I for piano and electronic sounds
- 12 Mobile for symphony orchestra (1965)
- Metamorphosis III for symphony orchestra (1965)
- Music for Macbeth for chamber group
- Julius Caesar for theater
- Hiroshima, oratorio, text by Dora Castellanos, for symphony orchestra, countertenor, contralto, 16 female voices, choir, and tape
- Omaggio a Catullus (Homage to Catullus) for spoken voices, piano, harmonium, percussion, and electronic sounds
- HK 70
- Creation of the Earth

== Performances and recent presentations ==
In 2019, the Blaffer Art Museum at the University of Houston presented an exhibition around Nova's 1972 work Creación de la Tierra.
