= Capitan Luis Gonzaga Building =

Building in Manila, Philippines

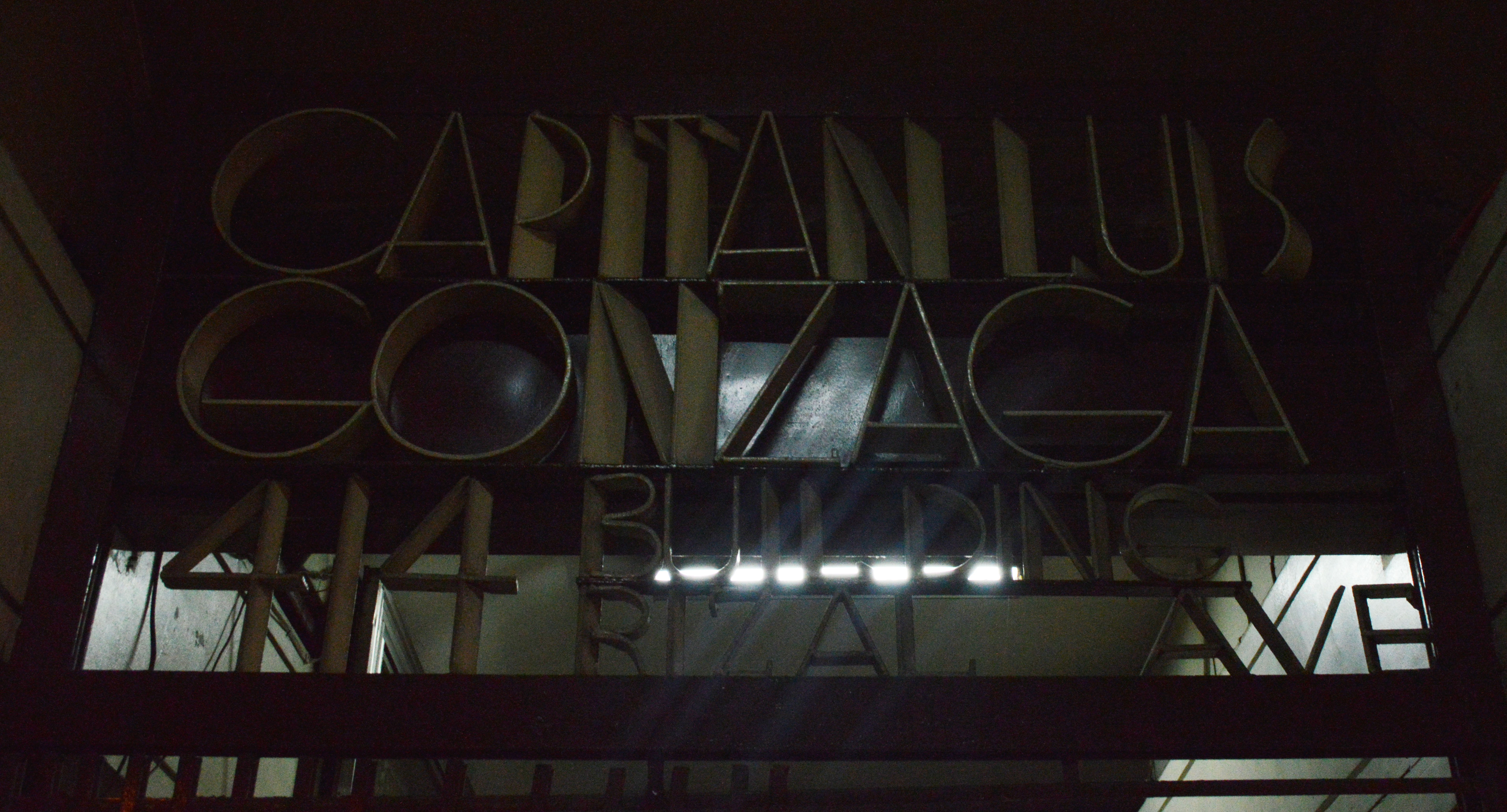
- Metal signage of Capitan Luis Gonzaga Building located at the top of the doorway

- Location within Metro Manila

General information
- Architectural style: Modern
- Location: no. 414 Carriedo Street corner Rizal Avenue, Manila, Philippines
- Coordinates: 14.5991°N 120.9816°E

Design and construction
- Architect: Pablo Antonio

The National Artist Pablo Antonio's postwar oeuvre, the Capitan Luis Gonzaga Building, built in 1953 at the corner of Carriedo Street and Rizal Avenue in Manila, Philippines, transfigured the modernist box into a building that was suited to the tropics by utilizing double sunshades. The concrete slab overhangs at both ceiling height and window sill height for every floor braced by staggered vertical fins of half-storey height. Curved bands of concrete horizontally traversed every floor. It serves as a protection for both sunlight and rain.
