= Luis Ariel Rey =

Colombian musician, singer, and songwriter

- Also known as: El Jilguero del Llano
- Born: Luis Ariel Rey Roa; 6 June 1934; Villavicencio, Colombia
- Died: 31 May 1975 (aged 40) Bogotá, Colombia
- Genres: Música llanera
- Years active: 1950–1975

Luis Ariel Rey Roa (Note: In this Spanish name, the first or paternal surname is Rey and the second or maternal family name is Roa.) (1934–1975) was a Colombian musician, singer, and songwriter. Rey was the first nationally successful performer of música llanera in Colombia, and is known for his innovations in llanero music and dress.

== Biography ==
Luis Ariel Rey Roa was born on 6 June 1934 in Villavicencio, in the Colombian department of Meta, to Ana Joaquina Roa Moreno and Javier Rey. At the age of 13 he formed a joropo trio with his brothers Leonel and Gil Arialdo called Rivermun; they later changed their name to Los Llaneros. The group also recorded under the name Luis Ariel Rey y sus Llaneros.

Rey's first recordings were in 1950 for Bogotá record label Vergara: they were the joropos "Ay, Sí, Sí", "Seis Numerao", "La Tigra Cebada", and "Gavilán Currulado". He initially played guitar in Los Llaneros, but in 1957 started to play the Venezuelan harp, which became popular in Colombian joropo. Rey also changed the traditional outfit of a llanero musician, "which became characterised by a combination of Mexican charro, Colombian and Venezuelan peasant styles, and rural police dress."

Rey recorded several traditional llanero songs for the first time, and his versions are considered some of the best. His notable recordings include "Ay, Sí, Sí", "Guayabo Negro", "La Tigra Cebada", "El Pájaro Carpintero", "El Negro José María", and "Perro de Agua", and his biggest hit "Carmentea", written by Miguel Ángel Martín. In total Rey recorded more than 40 LPs for various record labels including Vergara, Philips, Odeón, Codiscos, and Discos Fuentes.

Rey died on 31 May 1975 in Bogotá. He was in the city to collect passes from Cecilia Caballero Blanco for him and his band to travel to New York to perform, when he was arrested for using a bounced cheque; the shock allegedly caused his cardiac arrest.
