= Fernando Guillén Martínez =

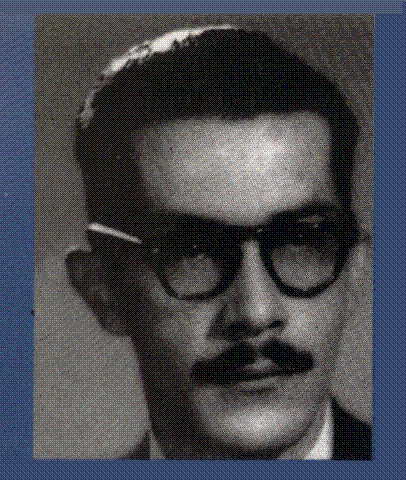
- Born: Fernando Guillén Martínez; 1925; Bogota, Colombia
- Died: 1975 (aged 49–50)
- Occupation: Professor

Fernando Guillén Martínez (1925–1975) was a Colombian researcher, journalist, historian, sociologist and essayist.

Born in 1925, Bogota, Colombia, Guillén Martínez was a social scientist, considered as one of the most lucid essayists that Latin America has produced. Indeed, he was able to interpret the true historical, social and political structure that characterizes the Ibero-American countries and that has its roots in the Spanish medieval institutions that were transplanted into the "New World" where they acquired their own characteristics, generating a sociopolitical structure deeply unjust and difficult to combat, even in the theoretical field.

The work of Guillén Martínez established a break with the work of his contemporaries who interpreted history as the exaltation in chronological order of the lives of political, military and religious leaders showing them as a kind of figures whose example was to follow and ignoring the precarious social reality. The work of Guillén analyzes the very roots of the institutions and governance that took place in the towns that inhabited the Iberian peninsula since long before their arrivaland foundation of colonies in America, generating there their own characteristics and ways of domination from the beginning of the mestizo society.

This "radiography" unravels the essence of Latin American countries and allows us to understand why, despite their various assets -immense natural wealth, great cities but also its tourism, agricultural, livestock and fishing potential, etc., they continue to generate so many social inequalities. It also helps to understand why corruption and underdevelopment are endemic problems that have not been overcome. Guillén shows where the problem is and tries to arouse public attention to end a situation of human iniquity that is unparalleled in the whole course of world history.

Guillén was a prolific researcher, journalist, historian, sociologist and essayist, author of well-known works such as "El secreto y la imagen"; (Note: The Secret and the Image, essay) "La torre y la plaza"; (Note: The tower and the square) "Estructura histórica, social y política de Colombia"; (Note: Historical, social and political structure of Colombia) "La Regeneración"; (Note: The Regeneration) and "El poder político en Colombia". (Note: Political Power in Colombia) Some of his works were written as supporting documents in limited numbers for his interventions in academic forums, university professorships and specialized magazines and his content has not yet been outdated and it continues to be relevant nowadays. This is the reason why a compilation of his works is to be published in a solo book, which is currently under contemplation, as is the case of: Instituciones medievales españolas (Medieval Spanish institutions); El enigma del poder (The enigma of power); Estados Unidos no es modelo (The United States is not a model); ¿Partidos políticos en 1980? (Political parties in 1980?), etc.

Fernando Guillén got married in 1948 with Josefina Jiménez González with whom he had seven children: María Clara, historian; Gonzalo, journalist and writer; Felipe, journalist and writer; Alejandro, architect; María del Rosario, historian; María Margarita, philosopher and María del Pilar, business administrator. He was professor at several universities in Colombia and in the United States of America like Georgetown, New Mexico, Yale, National University of Colombia, University of Antioquia and University Jorge Tadeo Lozano. He was editor-in-chief and columnist for the newspaper La Razón, editor of Semana magazine in his first period and columnist for the newspaper El Tiempo, in Bogota. At the time of his death he served as Coordinator of Political Studies of the Center for Research for Development (CID) of the National University of Colombia.

== Selected bibliography ==
La regeneración, primer frente nacional, Bogotá: C. Valencia Editores, 1986.1[4] El poder político en Colombia, Bogotá: Editorial Punta de Lanza, 1979.2[5]

‘El Modelo de “El Poder”’, NS Northsouth - Canadian Association of Latin American Studies -, 2 (1977), 1–203[6]

El enigma de las decisiones, Bogotá: Universidad Nacional de Colombia, Centro de Investigaciones para el Desarrollo, 1974.4[7] La nueva forma del estado, Bogota: Universidad Nacional, 1974.5[8]

La estructura y la función de los partidos políticos en Colombia: los frentes nacionales, la regeneración: un estudio de caso, Bogotá: Universidad Nacional de Colombia, Centro de Investigaciones para el Desarrollo, 1974.6[9]

El poder: los modelos estructurales del poder político en Colombia, Bogotá: Universidad Nacional de Colombia, Centro de Investigaciones para el Desarrollo, 1973.7

Las asociaciones como centros generadores de poder político, Bogota: Universidad nacional de Colombia, 1970.8

Planning and Social Participation in Latin America, Varna, Bulgaria, 1970.9

Raíz y futuro de la revolución, Bogotá: Ediciones Tercer mundo, 1963.10

La torre y la plaza: un ensayo de interpretación de América, Madrid: Cultura Hispánica, 1958.11

El secreto y la imagen, Bogotá: Ediciones Espiral, 1949.12

El problema de la música en Colombia, Bogota, Colombia, 1946.13
