= Nora Sanderson =

New Zealand romance novelist (1905–1975)

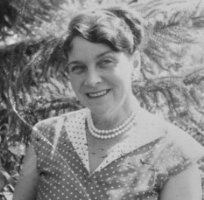
- Born: Nora Brocas; 14 February 1905; Ōpōtiki, New Zealand
- Died: 2 March 1975 (aged 70); Templeton, New Zealand
- Occupations: Romance novelist; children's writer; short story writer; nurse
- Spouse: Frederick Sanderson (m. 1934)
- Children: 6

Nora Sanderson (née Brocas; 14 February 1905 – 2 March 1975) was a New Zealand writer of romance novels, children's books and short stories, and nurse. She wrote 21 novels during her lifetime, mainly for the publisher Mills & Boon.

== Early life and career ==
Sanderson was born on 14 February 1905 in Ōpōtiki, the daughter of a farming family. She spent most of her children on a farm at Hokianga but attended Auckland schools. She trained as a nurse at the hospital in Rawene and worked in the Auckland area until her marriage. Her husband, Frederick Sanderson, was a Methodist minister and they had five sons and one daughter; later in life they lived in Templeton, in the South Island near Christchurch.

Having written short stories for radio and newspapers since she was a teenager, Sanderson's first successful book was a children's story called The Puppy Cat published in 1953. It was used by the Education Department for education in schools and serialised by the New Zealand Broadcasting Corporation for radio.

== Romance novels and later career ==
During her career Sanderson wrote 21 romance novels, published mainly by Mills & Boon and by the English Women's Weekly Library. Many of her novels featured a nursing theme, including her first novel, Hospital in New Zealand (1962), and No Welcome for Nurse Jane (1968). In 1964 she said that each novel took her three months to write. In 1966, at the time of publishing her twelfth novel, she said her novels "are all light romantic nursing stories because my publishers like them that way".

No Bells Were Ringing (1968), her first novel not to feature nursing, was written after a request from her publisher for a work suitable for the American market, without "crime, or hospital stories, or complicated plots". A review of A Stranger to the Truth (1969) featured in The Press said that Sanderson "must be commended for her ingenious plot", in which a young American woman impersonates her New Zealand friend. The review noted Sanderson's promotion of New Zealand tourism "by making Kathy the recipient of all kinds of information about the country ... and arranging that she shall be flown extensively over both islands with travelogue descriptions of their charms".

Sanderson held strong political views, and included these themes in her books, such as in The Sun Breaks Through (1975) in which the heroine saves beech forests from being destroyed. Her obituary in The Press noted that she was a regular caller to radio talk shows and a regular writer to newspaper editors. Her writing for children included a serial, Mr Imp, for a New Zealand magazine, and an eight-episode serial for radio called A Dog Called Sed.

Sanderson was a member of the British Romantic Novelists' Association and a founder of a similar organisation in New Zealand. She was a member of the New Zealand Women Writers' Society from 1953 until her death. Her novels were published in Denmark, the Netherlands and Brazil, as well as other English-speaking countries. She died on 2 March 1975.

== Selected works ==
- The Puppy Cat (1953, children's book)
- Hospital in New Zealand (1962)
- The Ordeal of Nurse Thompson (1963)
- The Two Faces of Nurse Roberts (1963)
- Shadows in the Ward (1964)
- A Partner for Dr Philip (1964)
- The Taming of Nurse Conway (1964)
- No Welcome for Nurse Jane (1968)
- No Bells Were Ringing (1968)
- Stranger to the Truth (1969)
- Place in the Sun (1969)
- The Sun Breaks Through (1975)
