= White Cross Orphanage =

Orphanage in San Juan, Philippines

White Cross, Inc.
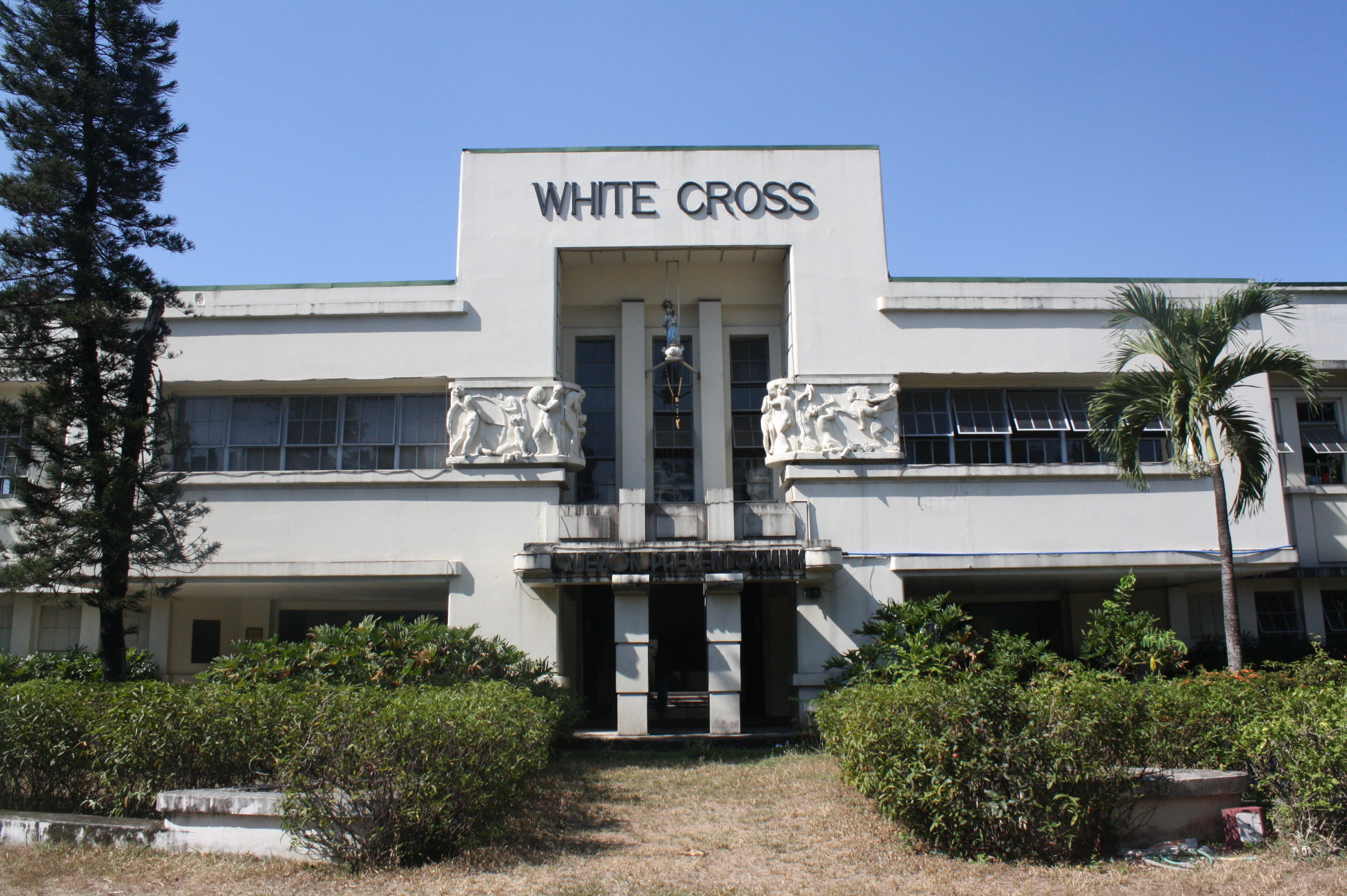
- Interactive map of the White Cross, Inc. area
- Former names: Quezon Preventorium
- Alternative names: La Cruz Blanca

General information
- Status: Orphanage
- Architectural style: Art Deco
- Location: 276 Santolan Road, San Juan, Metro Manila, Philippines, Philippines
- Coordinates: 14.604589°N 121.034764°E
- Current tenants: children 0–6 years old
- Construction started: 1936
- Inaugurated: 10 September 1938

Design and construction
- Architect: Pablo Antonio

White Cross Orphanage is a childcare agency in San Juan, Philippines that provides temporary shelter for children, who are 0–6 years old. Accredited by the Department of Social Welfare and Development (DSWD), it gives refuge to children of unwed mothers, indigent families, tuberculosis patients, mentally or physically-incapacitated parents, prisoners, or victims of incest or rape. These children are provided with medical assistance, educational care, and financial support to help them in their early years.

== History ==
=== Beginnings ===
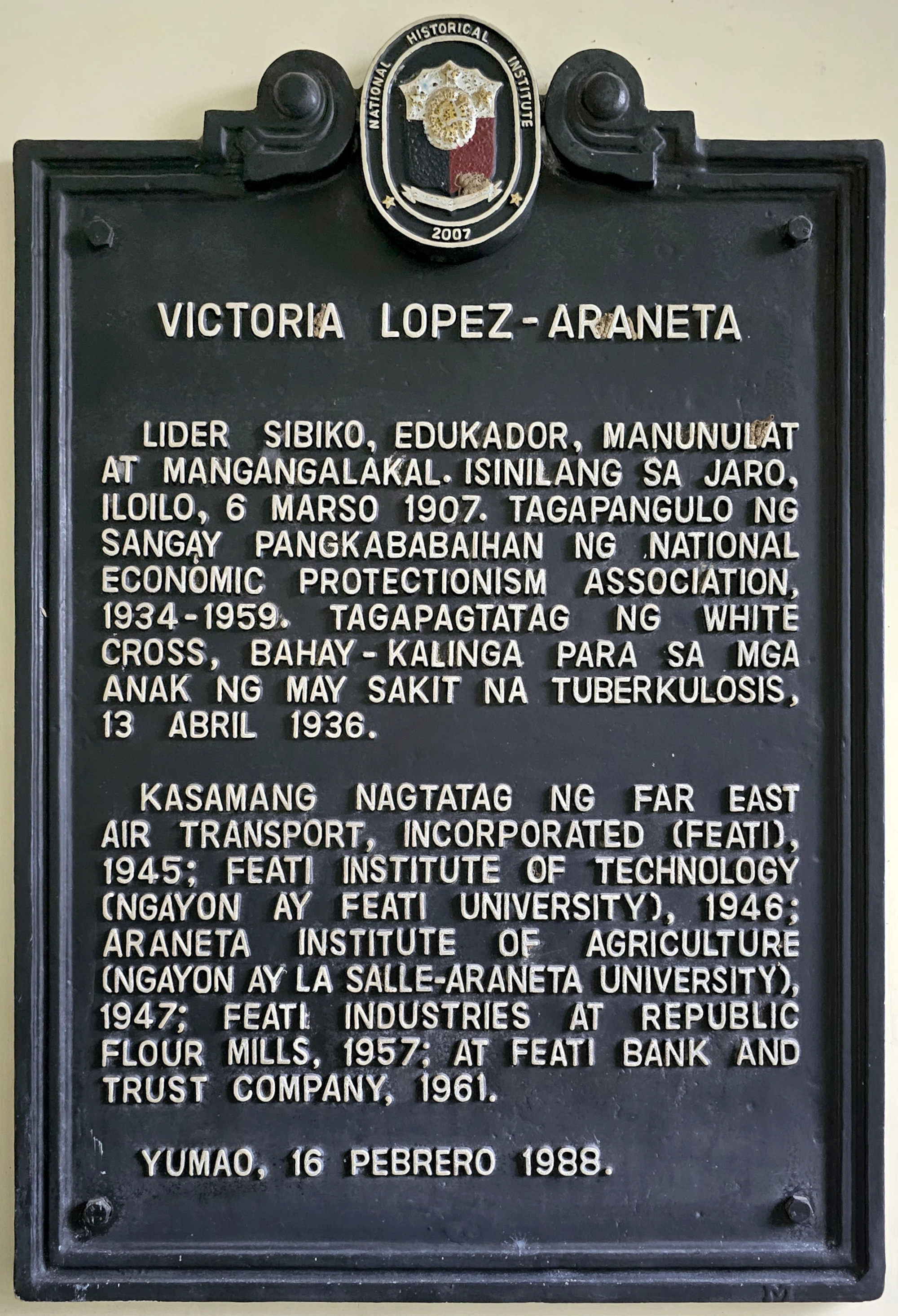
Historical marker installed in 2007 at the main building of the orphanage to commemorate founder Victoria Lopez-Araneta

In the early 20th century when there was an outbreak of tuberculosis in the Philippines, the orphanage was established to shelter the children of the patients of the Quezon Institute. It was founded by Victoria López de Araneta in 1936. Its founding board members include Mercedes McMicking, Conrado Dayrit, Emmanuel J. Dymek, Teodoro Evangelista, Mrs. Carl Hess, Manuel Mañosa, Vincente Marasigan, Paulino Miranda Sampedro, Gonzalo Puyat, Juan Tuason, and Soledad Zulueta.

Through the leadership of de Araneta, the board purchased four hectares of land along Santolan Road, San Juan del Monte, where the structure would be built. One of its recognized supporters at that time was President Manuel L. Quezon and in his honor the orphanage was also known as the Quezon Preventorium. He signed a bill that allowed a portion of horse race revenues to be channeled to the orphanage.

In 1938, two years after beginning operations, the institution was given to the care of the Daughters of Charity of Saint Vincent de Paul who took in 20 children of tuberculosis patients as its wards. The nuns ran the orphanage until they turned it over to the current board in 2004.

=== World War II ===
On 20 June 1944, during World War II, the occupying Japanese seized the orphanage. The nuns escaped with the children to the Welfareville Compound near General Kalentong Street in Mandaluyong. Although the White Cross board gave them-overseer Sister Consuelo Muró the power to close the institution, she continued the children’s mission at the temporary Welfareville site. As the war ended and with help from liberating Allied troops, they restored White Cross, returning with the children and staff to San Juan in 1946.

== Architecture ==
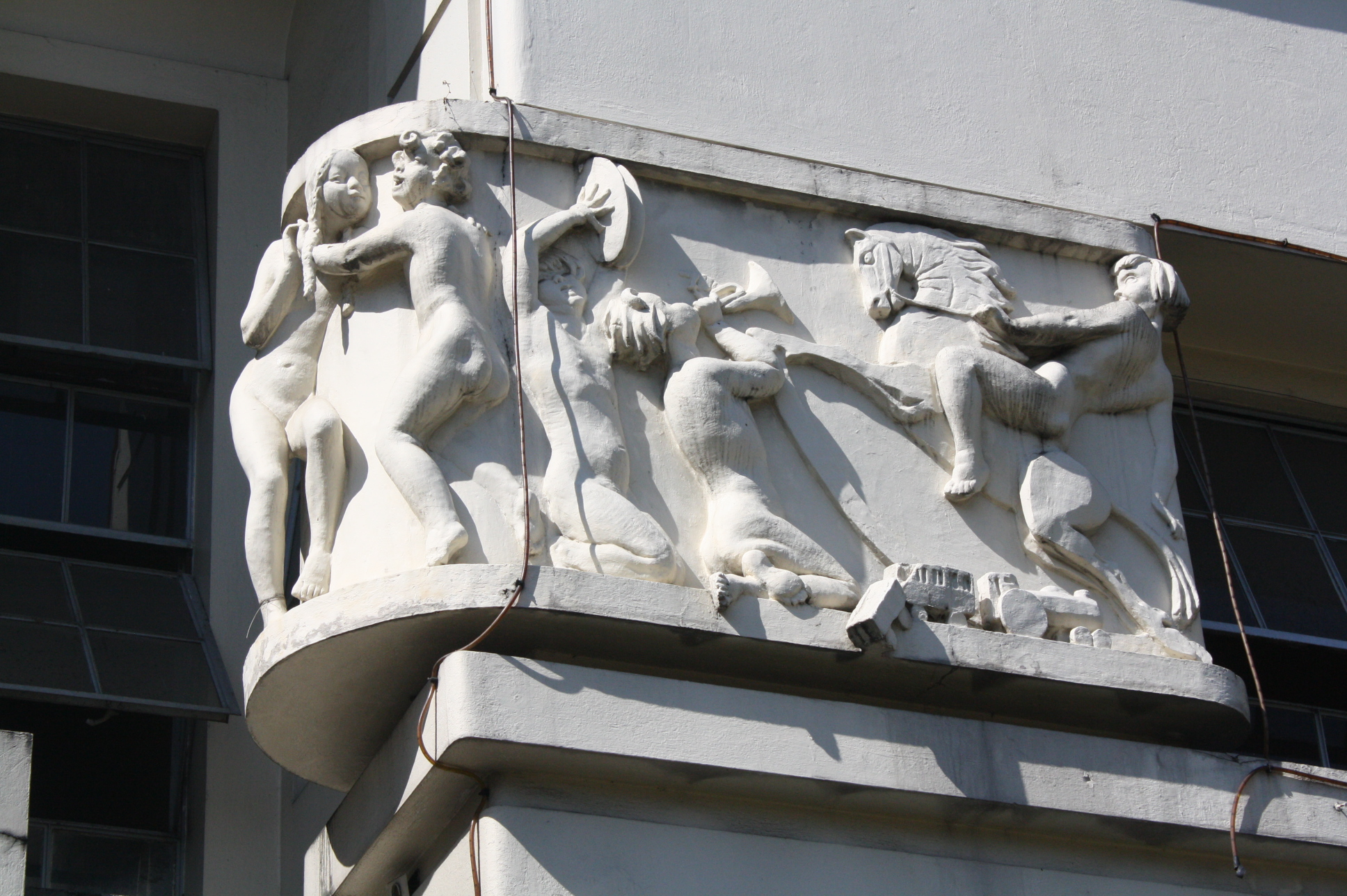
Relief of children at play.

Architect Pablo Antonio, later recognized as National Artist for Architecture, was commissioned to design White Cross, which was aimed to be a fresh-air shelter for the children of tuberculosis patients. The building has an Art Deco design with its façade shaped like a large white cross. The bas-reliefs of children at play by Italian sculptor Francesco Ricardo Monti softened the linear and sharp lines of the façade.

Among Antonio's works, which included the Far Eastern University (FEU), Ideal Garden, Orchid Garden Hotel, and Syquia Apartments, only the Manila Polo Club and White Cross are extant as the others have been demolished or otherwise dilapidated.
