= Pablo Antonio =

Filipino architect (1902–1975)

Pablo S. Antonio, Sr.
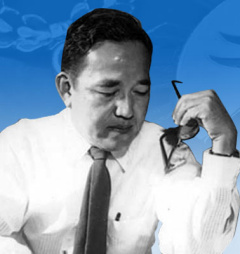
- Pablo S. Antonio from the Order of National Artists (NCCA)
- Born: Pablo Sebero Antonio; January 25, 1901; Binondo, Manila, Philippine Republic until the dissolution on April 19, 1901
- Died: June 14, 1975 (aged 74); Manila, Philippines
- Resting place: Manila Memorial Park – Sucat, Paranaque, Philippines
- Education: University of London
- Occupation: Architect
- Spouse: Marina del Rosario Reyes
- Children: Pablo R. Antonio Jr.
- Awards: Order of National Artists of the Philippines
- Buildings: Ideal Theater, Life Theater, Manila Polo Club
- Projects: Far Eastern University Campus

Pablo Sebero Antonio, Sr. (January 25, 1901 – June 14, 1975) was a Filipino architect. A pioneer of modern Philippine architecture, he was recognized in some quarters as the foremost Filipino modernist architect of his time. The rank and title of National Artist of the Philippines was conferred on him by President Ferdinand Marcos in 1976.

== Early life ==
Antonio was born in Binondo, Manila on January 25, 1901. He was orphaned by the age of 12, and had to work in the daytime in order to finish his high school education and work at night. He studied architecture at the Mapua Institute of Technology but dropped out of school.

Ramon Arevalo, the engineer in charge of the Legislative Building project, funded Antonio's education at the University of London. He completed a five-year architecture course in three years, graduating in 1927.

== Works ==
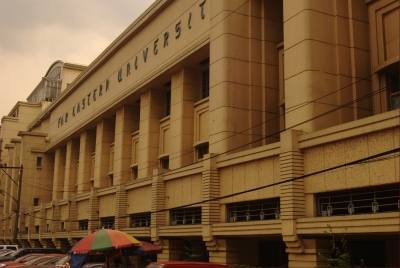
The facade of the main building of the Far Eastern University, designed by Pablo S. Antonio, Sr. and Nicolas Reyes in the late 1930s

Antonio first came into prominence in 1933 with the construction of the Ideal Theater along Avenida Rizal in Manila.

His work caught the eye of the Far Eastern University founder, Dr. Nicanor B. Reyes, Sr., who was looking to build a school campus that was modern in style. Between 1938 and 1950, he designed several buildings on the university campus in the Art Deco style. The FEU campus is considered as the largest ensemble of surviving Art Deco architecture in Manila. In 2005, it received an Honorable Mention citation from the UNESCO for the body's 2005 Asia-Pacific Heritage Awards for Culture Heritage Conservation.

Antonio also designed the White Cross Orphanage (1938) along Santolan Road in San Juan City, and the Manila Polo Club (1950) in Makati. He likewise designed the Ramon Roces Publications Building (now Guzman Institute of Electronics) in Soler Street in Manila, the Capitan Luis Gonzaga Building (1953), and the Boulevard-Alhambra (now called Bel-Air) Apartments Building in Roxas Boulevard & where Manila Bay Hostel is located on the 4th floor. The art deco apartment is near T. M. Kalaw Avenue & beside Miramar Hotel. It was built in 1937.

Apart from the Ideal Theater, Antonio also designed several other theaters in Manila, including the Dalisay, Forum, Galaxy, Life (1941), Lyric and Scala Theaters. As of 2014, only the Forum, Life and Scala Theaters remain standing; though the Forum and Scala Theaters have been gutted.

== Appreciation ==
Antonio's architecture and its adoption of Art Deco techniques was radical for its day, neoclassicism being the dominant motif of Philippine architecture when he began his career. His style was noted for its simplicity and clean structural design. He was cited for taking Philippine architecture into a new direction, with "clean lines, plain surfaces, and bold rectangular masses." Antonio strove to make each building unique, avoiding obvious trademarks.

Antonio was also conscious of adapting his buildings to the tropical climate of the Philippines. In order to highlight natural light and also avoid rain seepage, he utilized sunscreens, slanted windows and other devices.

Antonio himself has been quoted as stating that "buildings should be planned with austerity in mind and its stability forever as the aim of true architecture, that buildings must be progressive, simple in design but dignified, true to a purpose without resorting to an applied set of aesthetics and should eternally recreate truth" .

When he was named National Artist of the Philippines in 1976, he was only the second architect so honored, after his contemporary, Juan Nakpil. His eldest son, Architect Pablo Reyes Antonio Jr., restored some of his art deco buildings in the FEU campus.

== Death ==
Pablo Antonio died on June 14, 1975, in Manila, Philippines.
