= Druk Yul Park =

Park in Vienna, Austria

Coordinates: 48°09′23″N 16°16′26″E

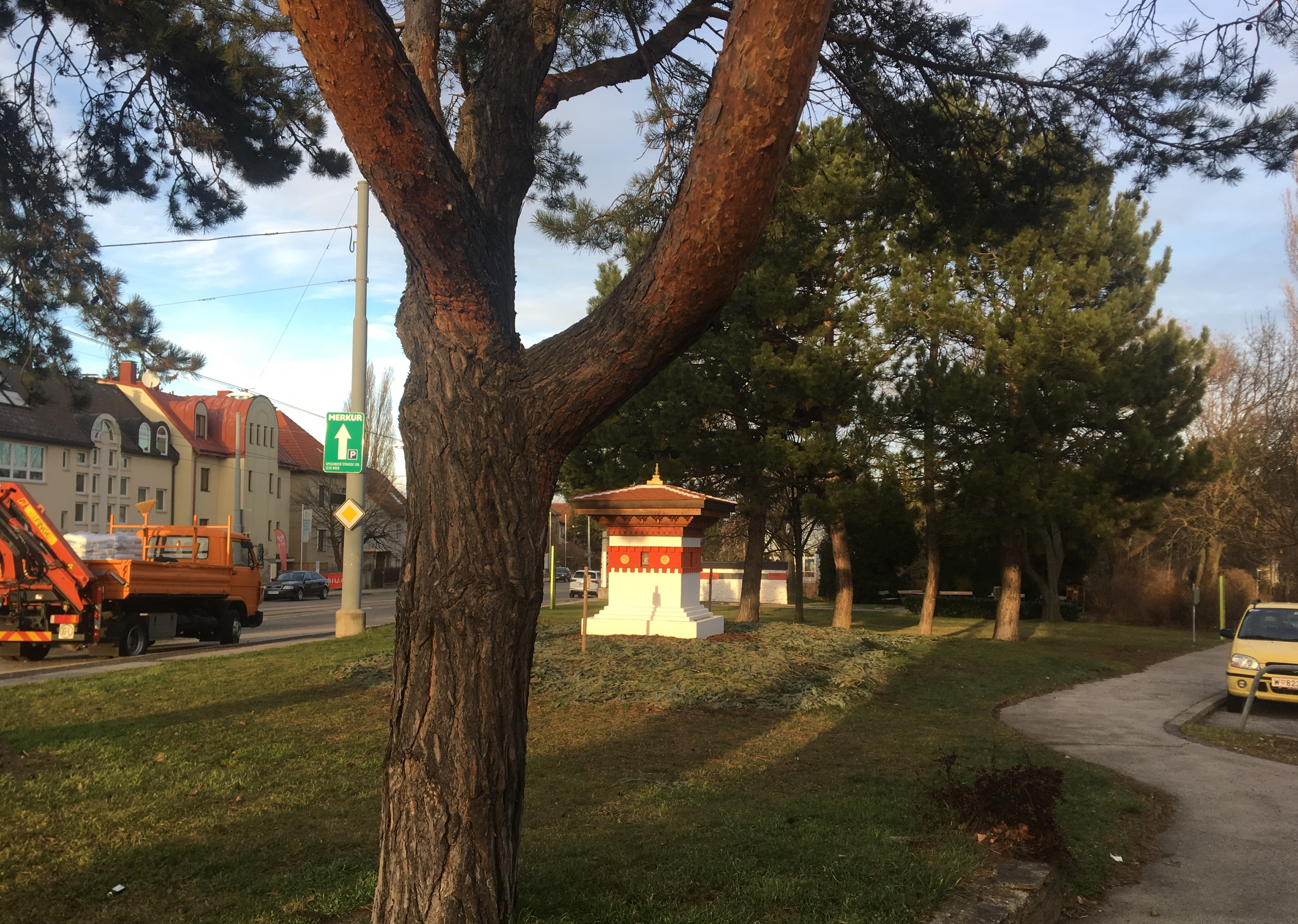
- Interactive map of Druk Yul Park
- Type: Small park
- Location: Mauer, Liesing
- Area: 3,000 m^{2} (0.74 acres)
- Operator: Vienna City Council
- Status: Open
- Website: www.wien.gv.at/umwelt/parks/anlagen/druk-yul-park.html

The Druk Yul Park is a small park in the 23rd district of Liesing in the south of Vienna, Austria. The park is located at the junction of Speisinger Street with Wittgenstein Street and Rosen Hügel Street in Liesing.

== History and infrastructure ==
In 2007, it was decided to honour the close friendly relations between Bhutan and Austria. Bhutan has had been a priority country for the Austrian Development Cooperation. The park was built on the occasion of the 100-year anniversary of the Kingdom of Bhutan.

In 2010, on the initiative of the Austrian-Bhutanese Society a chorten, a Bhutanese stupa, also known as a turret of happiness, was erected. Again in 2014, students of HTL Mödling constructed a Mani Wall in the park. The park was inaugurated on April 6, 2012, in the presence of the Ambassadors of China, India and the President of the Bhutanese Society. Friendship societies of India, Japan, Cambodia, Mongolia, Burma, Nepal, Sri Lanka and Thailand also participated in collaborative efforts.

== Photo gallery ==
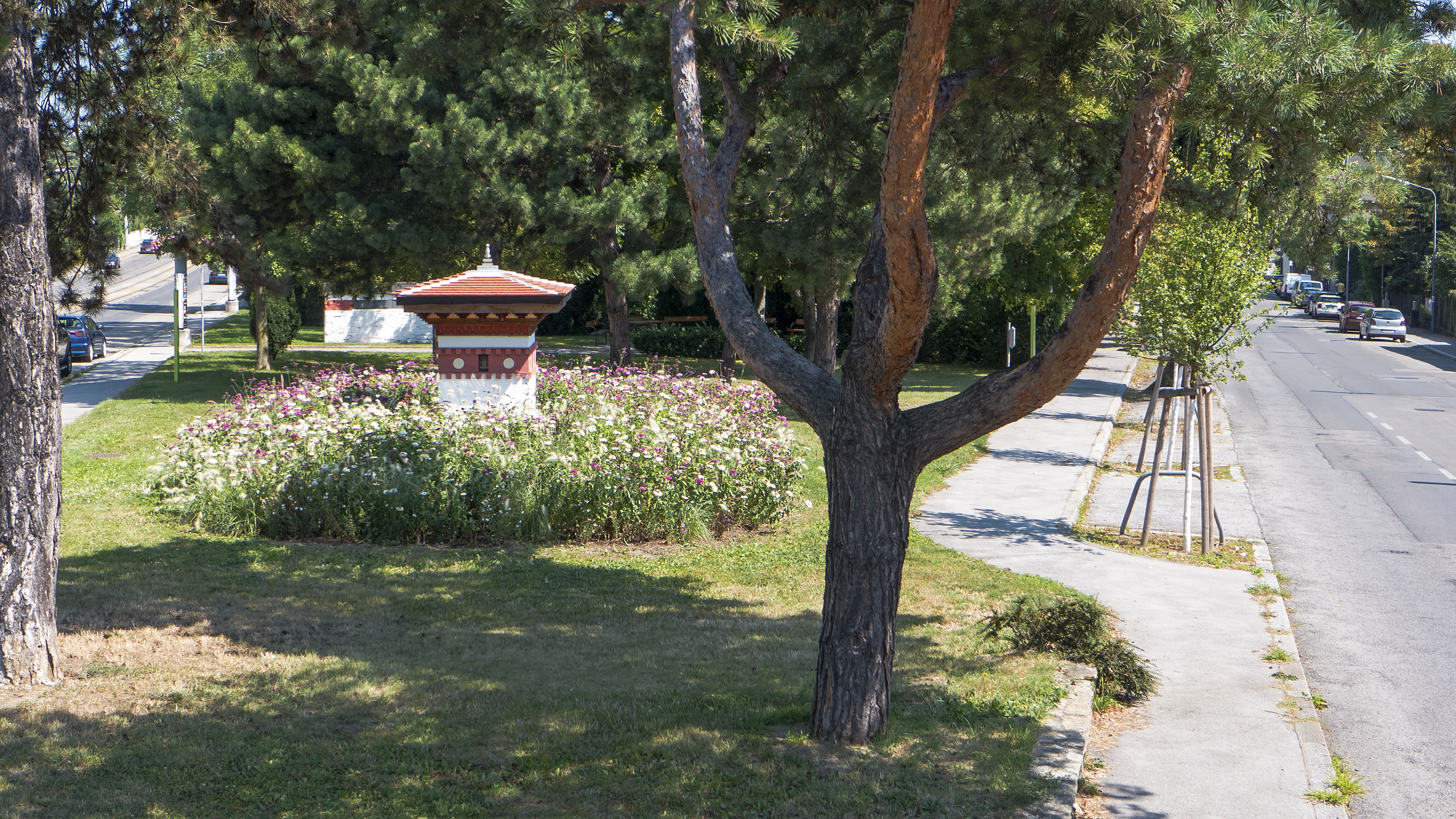
A landscape of the Druk Yul Park.

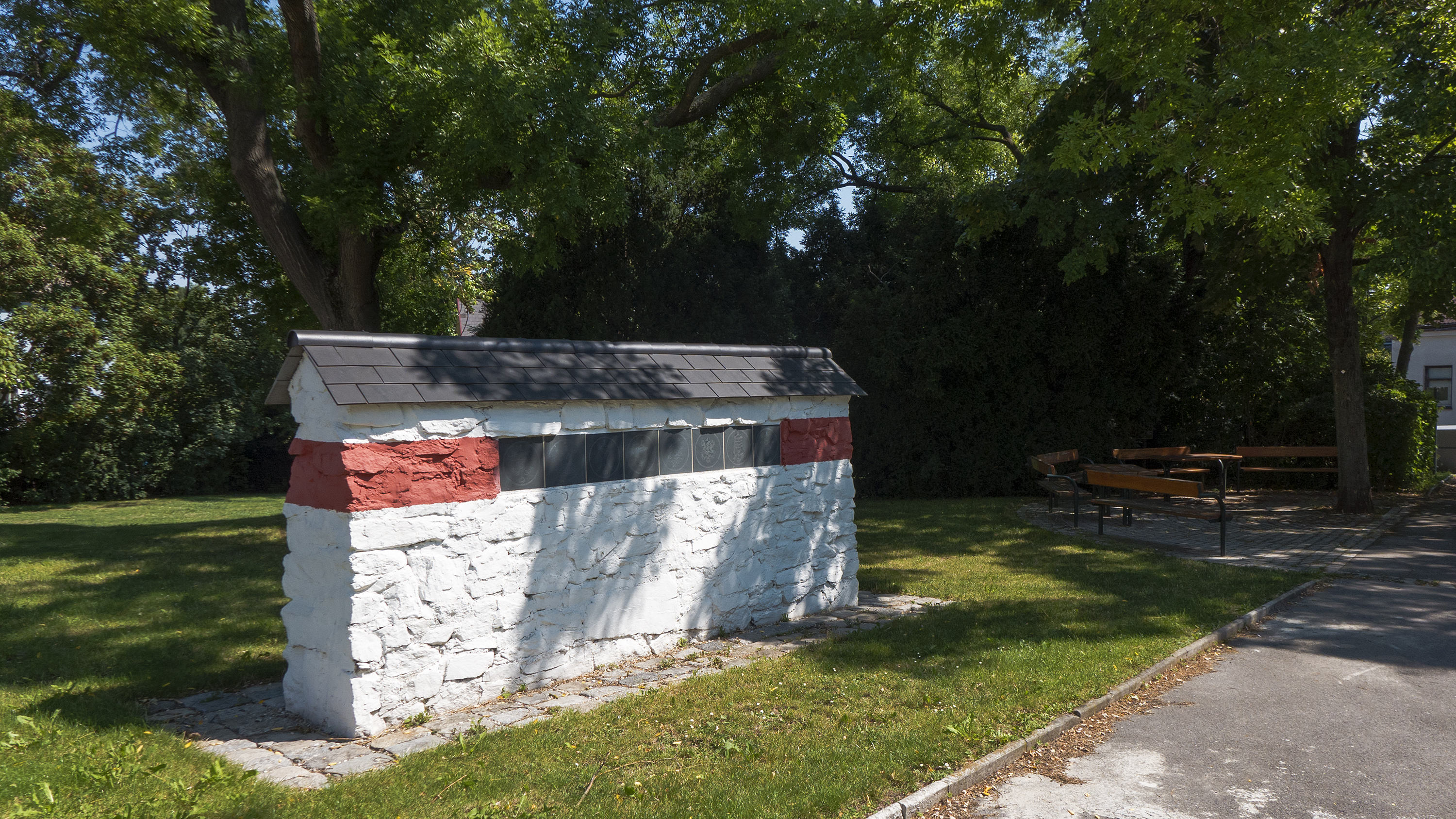
The Mani Wall.

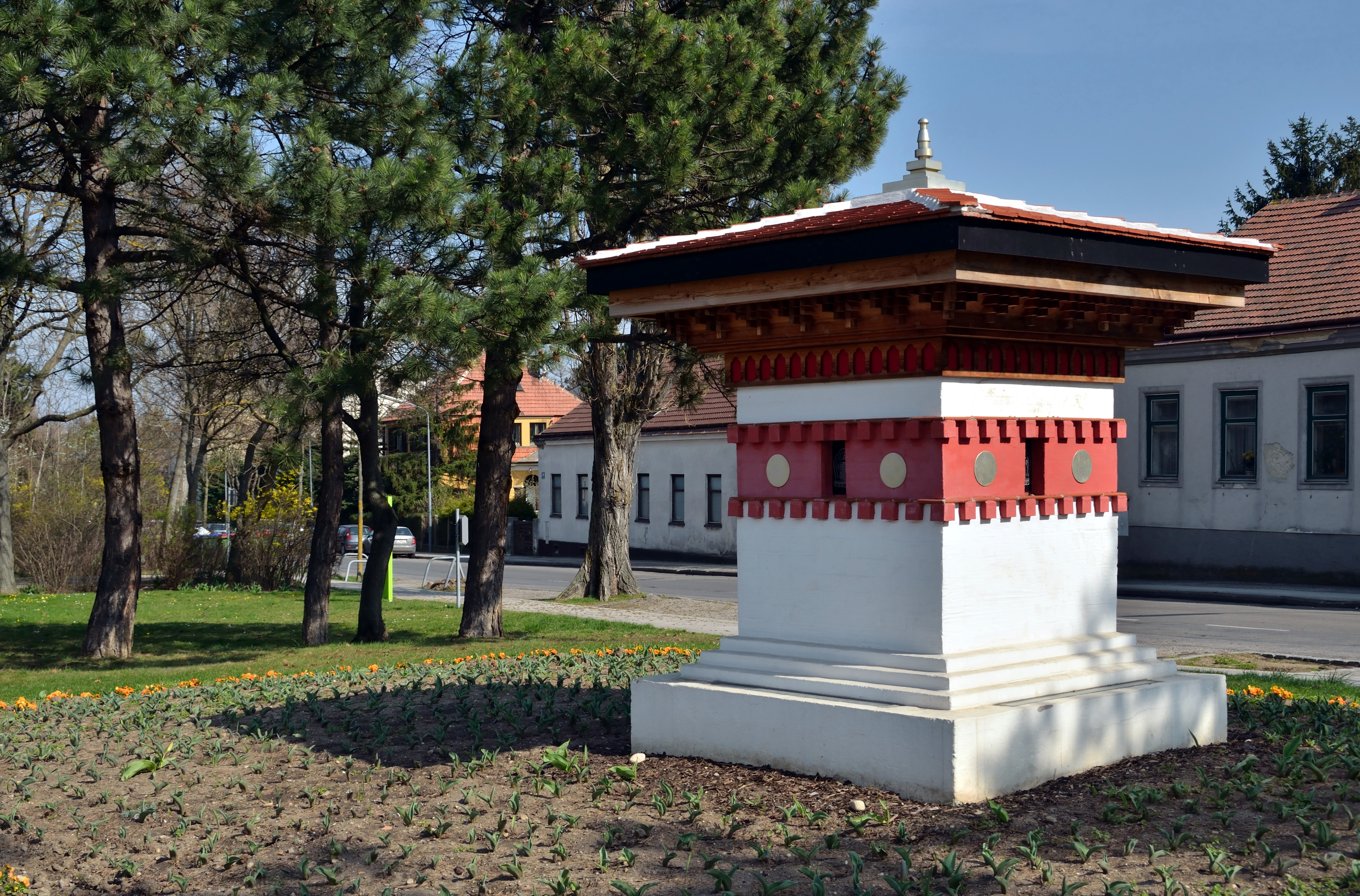
The Chorten in Druk Yul Park.

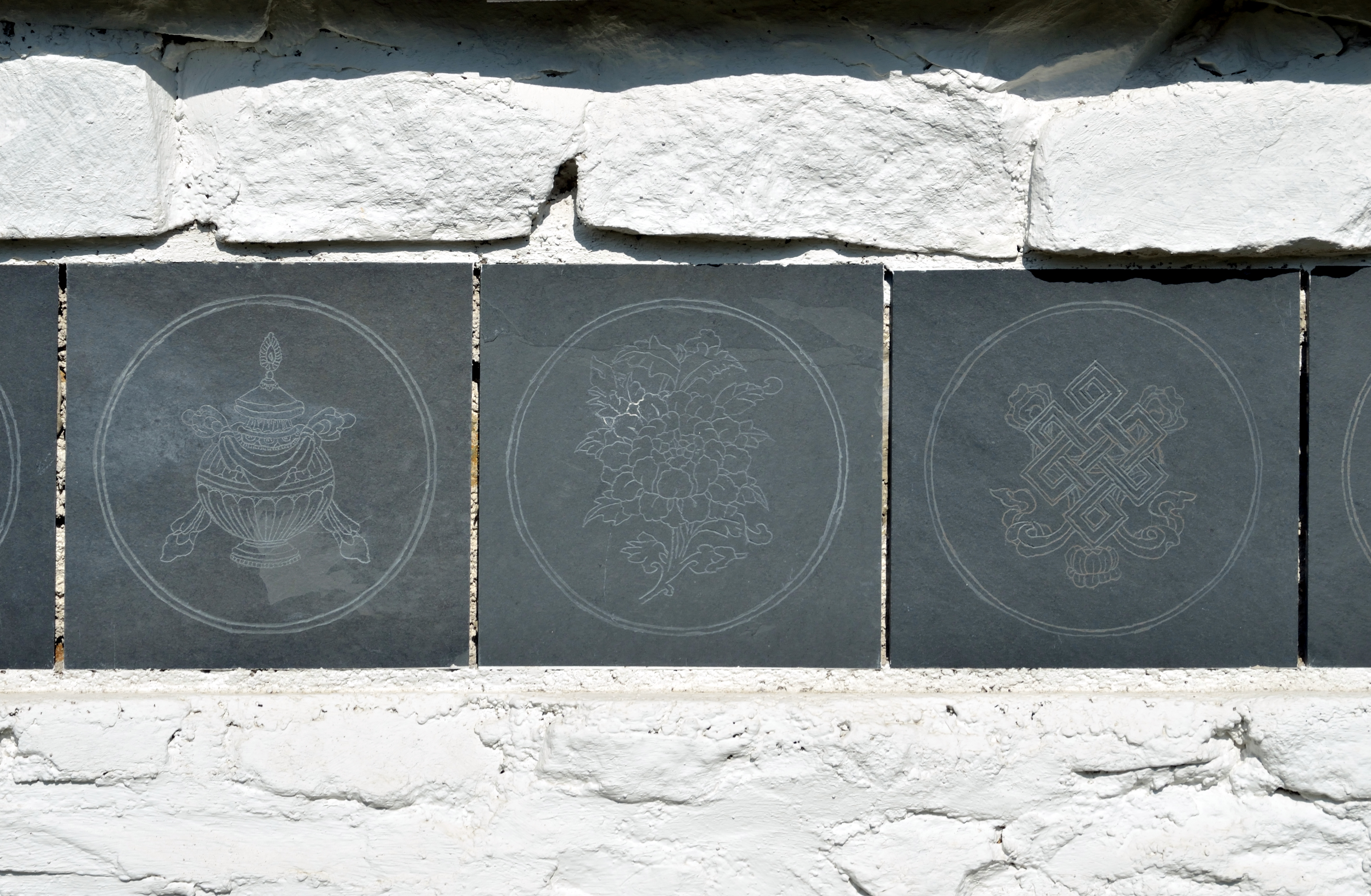
Inscription in the Mani wall.

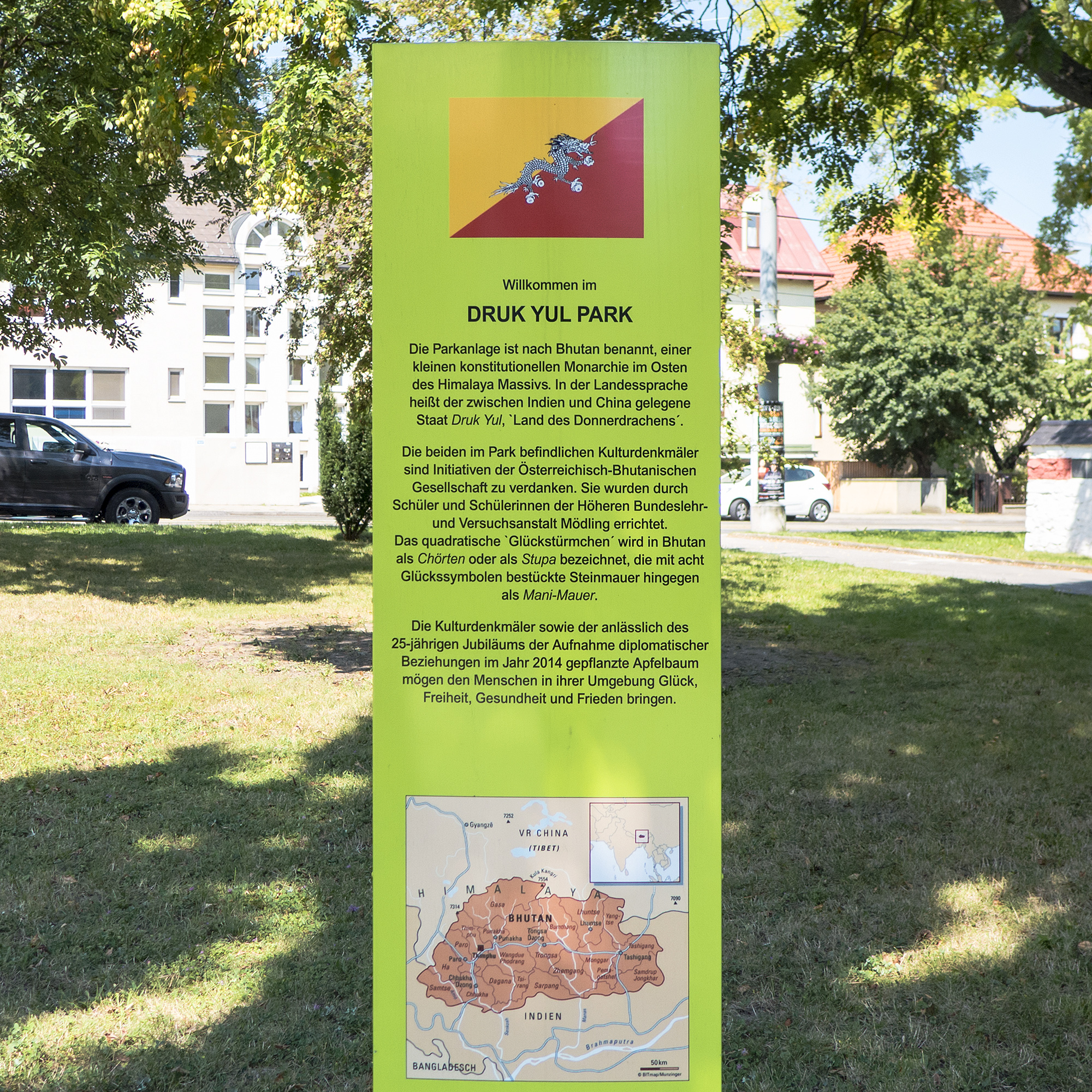
The welcome board in the park.

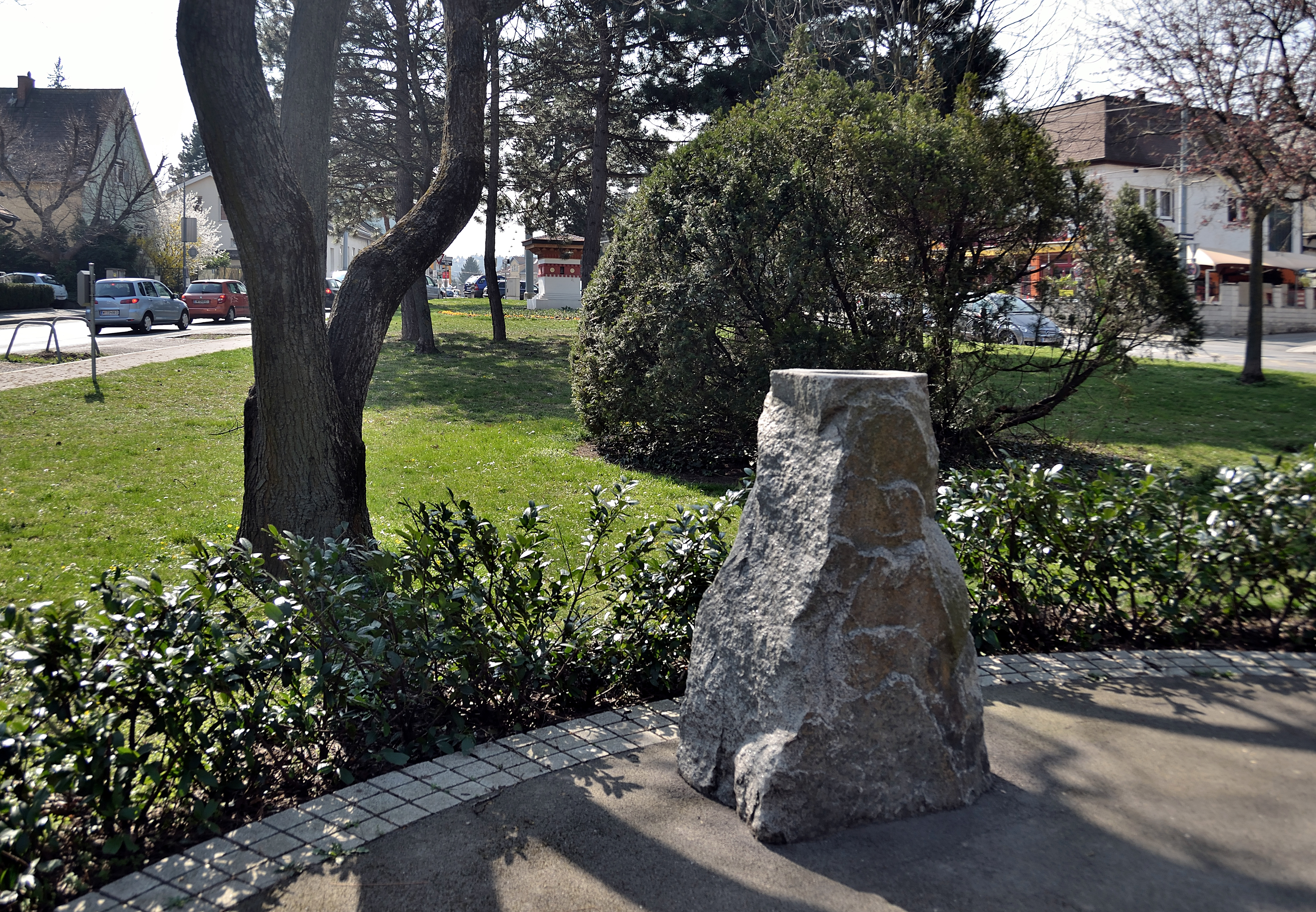
A stone pillar in the park.

== See also ==
- Austria–Bhutan relations
