= Inzersdorf (Vienna) =

Coordinates: 48°9′9″N 16°20′26″E

Inzersdorf

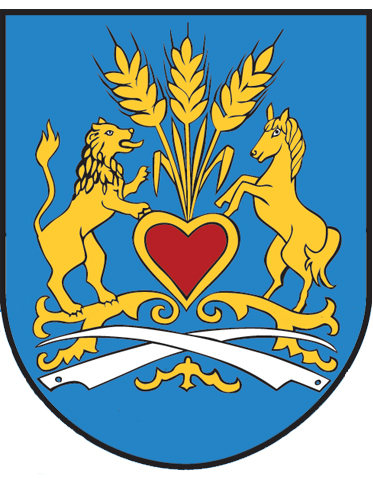
Emblem

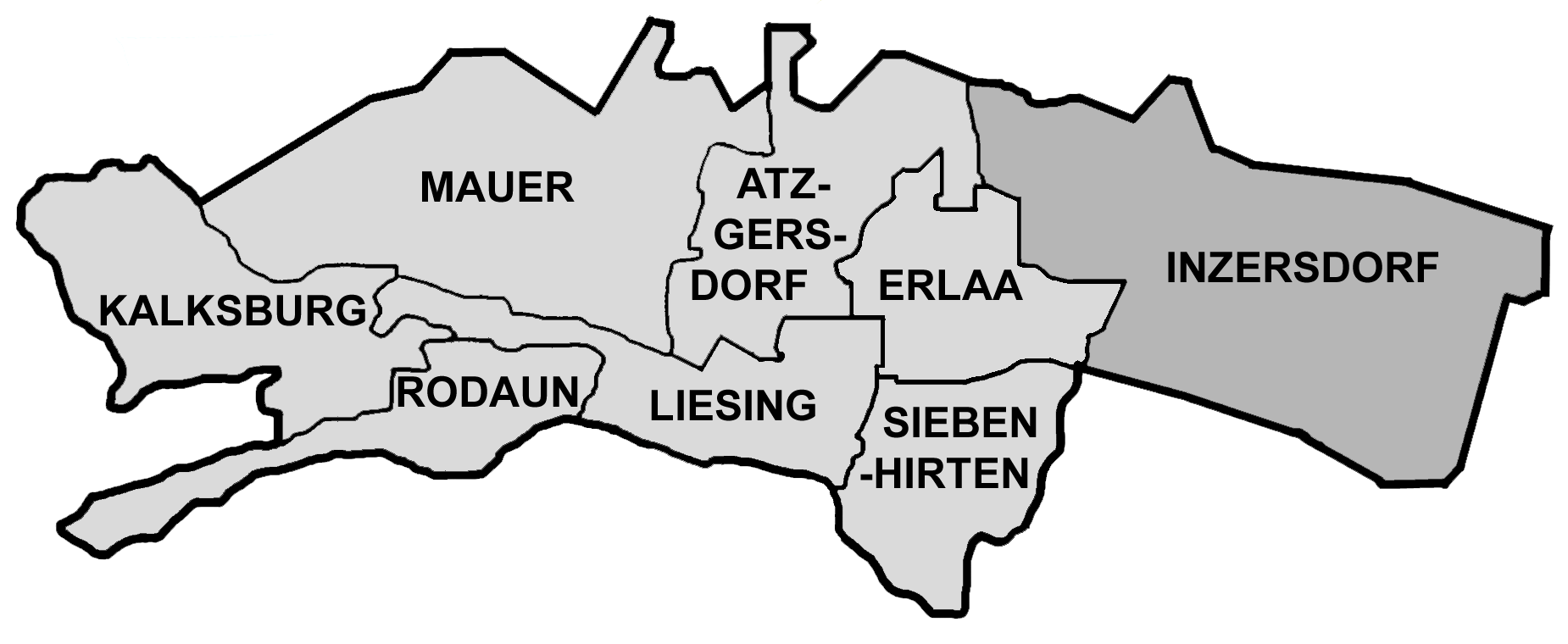
Map

Inzersdorf (German pronunciation: [ˈɪnt͡sɐsˌdɔʁf]; before 1893 Inzersdorf am Wienerberge, between 1893 and 1938 Inzersdorf bei Wien; Central Bavarian: Inzasduaf) was before 1938 an independent municipality, and is now a part of the 23rd Viennese district Liesing.

Today, the cadastral commune Inzersdorf has got an area of 854.06 hectares (3.2975 sq mi) and is so on the biggest part of the district. But in the 19th century, independent Inzersdorf had also got place in the today 10th Viennese district, and bordered on the villages Vösendorf, Leopoldsdorf, Ober‑ and Unterlaa, and (in the west) on Erlaa.

== Geography ==
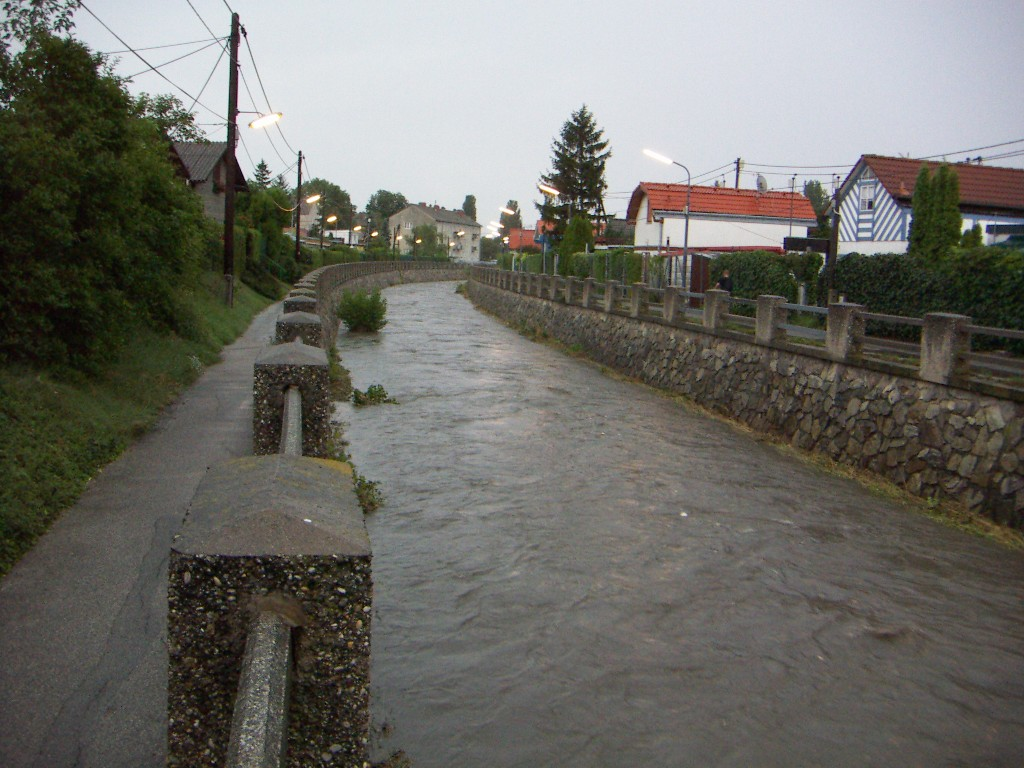
The Liesing River in Inzersdorf between Steinsee ("Stone Lake") and Schloßsee ("Palace Lake")

The village is located in a flat marsh, thus a lot of clay was deposited in the area by the Liesing River. That was the basis for 19th-century brickworks, whose mining holes remain until today as lakes.

Geologically spoken, most parts of Inzersdorf are built on rubble from Pleistocene. In the southeast and west of the village, quaternary loam exists. The north is counted among the geological era of Holocene.

== History ==
In 1120 and 1125, Inzersdorf's first mention occurred as Imicinesdorf respectively Ymizinisdorf thus meaning "village of Imizi(n)". It is supposed that the founder of the village was a man named Imizi, Imizo or Imizin.

Until the beginning of the 16th century, the commune involved two villages: Inzersdorf and Willendorf. But after the Siege of Vienna in 1529, when both villages were destroyed, only Inzersdorf was rebuilt. But peace did not least long, and in the Battle of Vienna in 1683, Inzersdorf was destroyed again. This time, Maria Katharina von Kinsky brought foreign settlers to the place.

When the brothers Geyer von Osterburg ruled the village in the 16th century, Inzersdorf became the hub of evangelic church. Many Protestants settled down nearby.

Years passed by and the lordship of Inzersdorf changed very often. In 1857, Ziegelbaron ("Brick Baron") Heinrich von Drasche-Wartinberg inherit the holding. The now aborning industrial location specialized in brick production and in 1872, the factories already produced 100 million bricks (by comparison: in 1848, they only produced 16 million). Because of that, the Viennese administration decided to integrate the northern part of Inzersdorf, where the factories were located, into the 10th Viennese district Favoriten.

After the integration of that northern part which was called now Inzersdorf-Stadt (Inzersdorf-City), the rest of the village was economically degraded. In the next few years, Inzersdorf orientated towards the nearby city Liesing.

After the "Anschluss" (annexation of Austria into Greater Germany by the Nazi regime), Inzersdorf was merged with Liesing and 13 other villages into "Great-Vienna". Together, these villages built the new 25th district of Vienna. After the end of the Second World War, Inzersdorf stayed inside of Vienna, while other villages came independent again. In 1954, Inzersdorf became part of the 23rd Viennese district Liesing. This district had had much industry before Second World War, and because of this, was bombed much by the Allies. But re-building proceeded fast, and in the end of the 20th century, new housing estates were built. In the years of 1988 until 1993, the estates "Traviatagasse" and "Othellogasse" were formed. This had big bearings on the number of inheritants of Inzersdorf: While in 1951, the cadastral commune had had about 6.000 inheritants, today there are about 14.500 people living in Inzersdorf.

== Culture ==
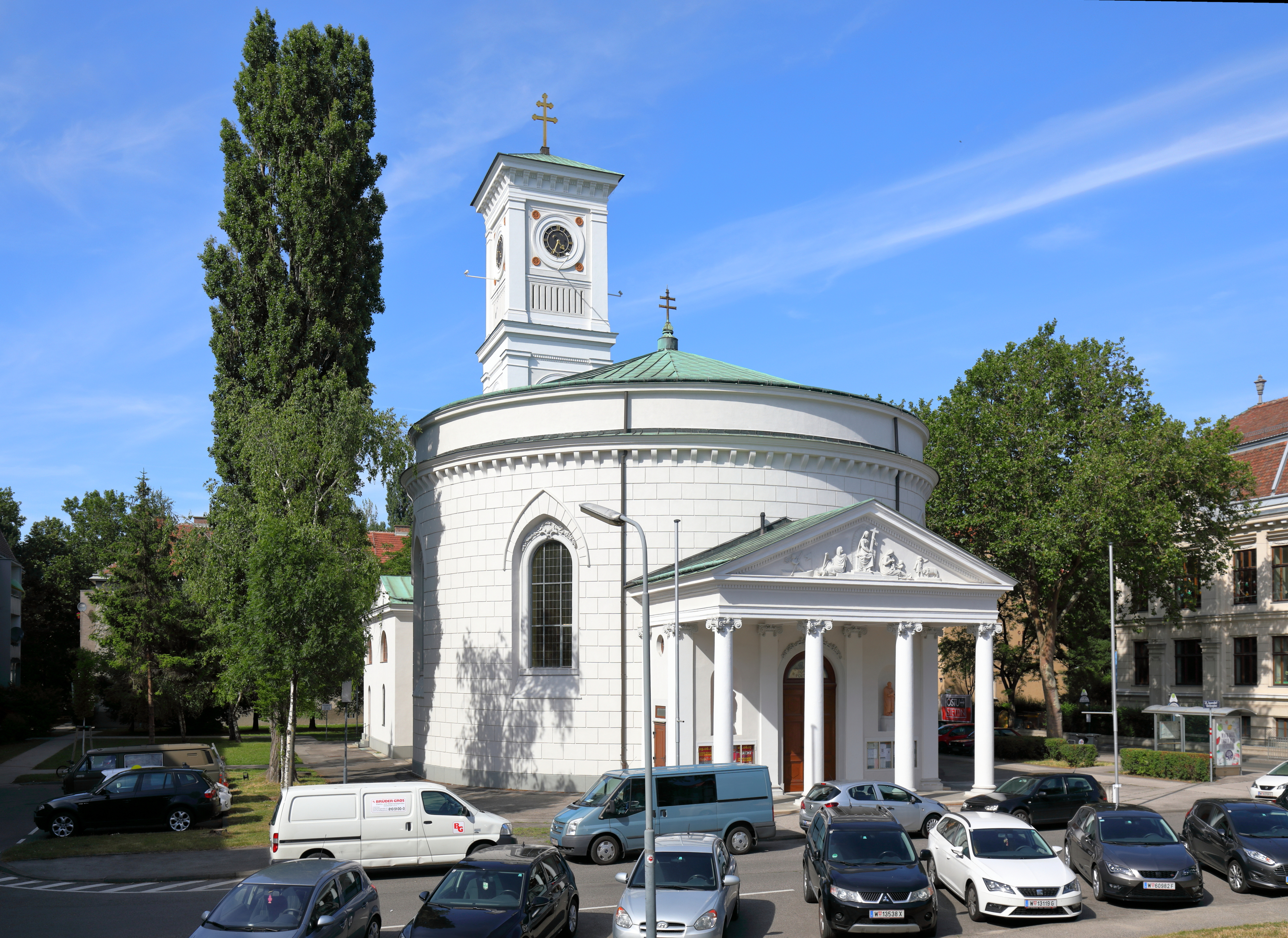
St. Nicholas' Church

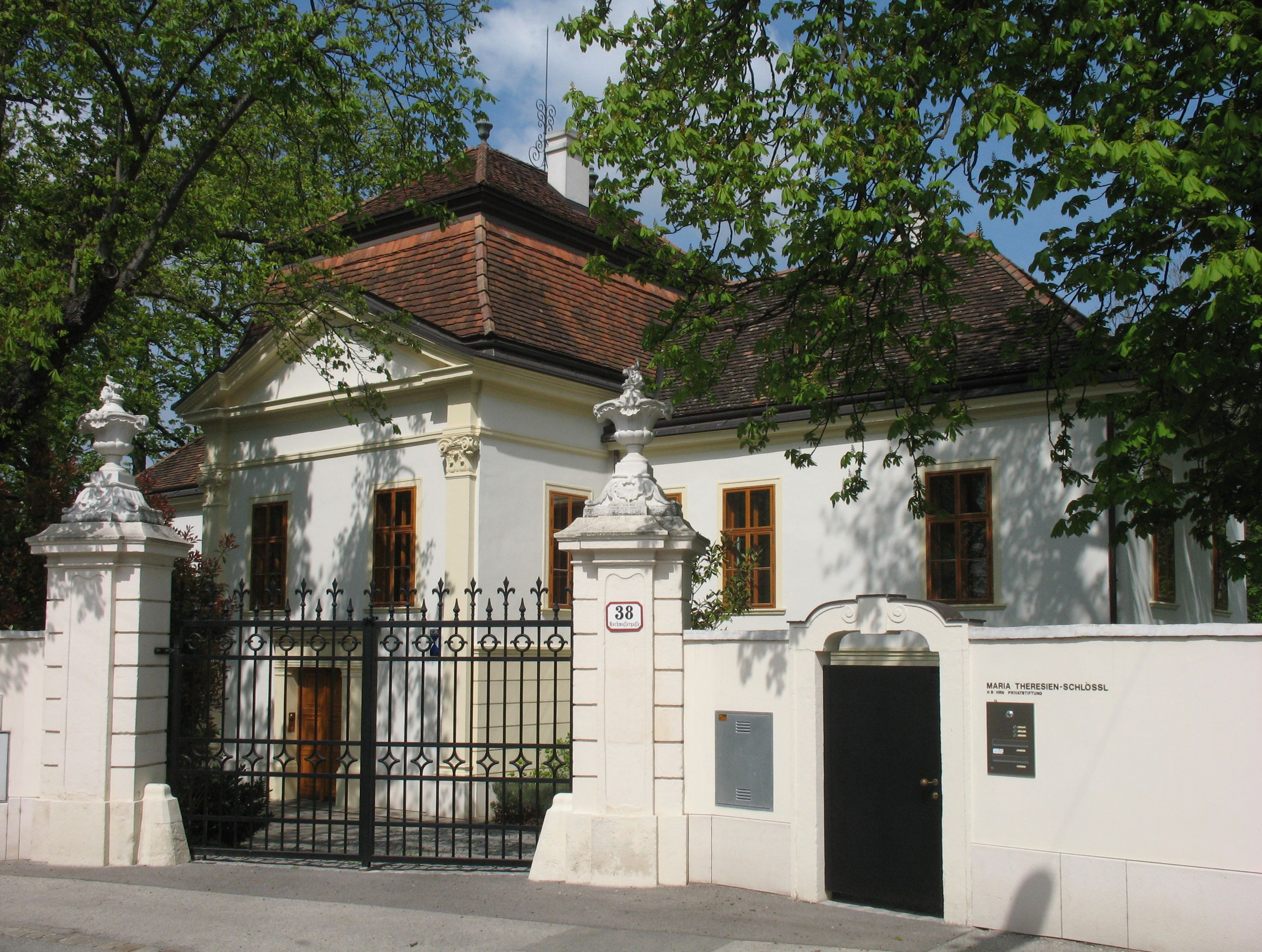
Maria Theresien-Schlössl

Originally both a baroque château from the 17th century and a second younger one were situated in Inzersdorf. The castles were damaged by bombings in the Second World War and knocked down in 1965 when the motorway A 23 "Südosttangente" was built. The former palace garden is used today as a public park.

The classicistic St. Nicholas' Church in the town center was built between 1818 and 1820. There had been a gothic building before that was destroyed in a fire on 8 June 1817. Other well-known buildings are the Maria-Theresien-Schlössel which was constructed by an architect coming from the environment of Johann Bernhard Fischer von Erlach and the Grünberger-Schlössl, a summer residence built in 1720/30.

The coat of arms of Inzersdorf shows three ears of grain growing out of a heart, framed by a golden lion and a golden horse.

== People ==
- Francesca Donner (1900–1992), wife of Syngman Rhee, President of South Korea
- Heinrich von Drasche-Wartinberg (1811–1880), Austrian industrialist
- Adelheid Popp (1869–1939), Austrian feminist
- Countess Maria Rosa Aloisia Katharina of Kinsky (1783–1842), owner of the Herrschaft Inzersdorf
- Rudolf Steiner lived there.
- Hubert Trimmel (born 1924), the speleologist
- Georg Virilli (1872–1951), mayor
- Hermann Beyfuss, for whom Beyfusgasse was named in 1954
