= Heinrich Krause =

Austrian painter

- Born: 9 June 1885; Vienna, Austria-Hungary
- Died: 30 July 1983 (aged 98); Vienna, Austria
- Occupation: Painter

Heinrich Krause (9 June 1885 – 30 July 1983) was an Austrian painter known for his contributions to still-life painting. His work played a significant role in Austrian art, particularly between the two World Wars. When art was included as an Olympic event, he competed at the 1936 Summer Olympics and the 1948 Summer Olympics.

== Early life and education ==
Krause was born in the Rodaun district of Vienna, Austria (now Liesing) in 1885. He pursued his art education at the prestigious Vienna Academy and studied under several notable instructors, including Julius Berger, Christian Griepenkerl, Kasimir Pochwalski, and was deeply influenced by Albin Egger-Lienz.

== Career and artistic style ==
Krause's career was marked by his active involvement with the Vienna Secession, an influential art movement, from 1914 to 1937. Later, he became an Honorary Member of the Vienna Künstlerhaus. His artistic oeuvre includes landscapes that hint at Austrian Impressionism and French landscape paintings from the 19th century, which are considered his most enduring works. His later floral pieces are noted for their spiritual and material form of light, often showing the influence of New Objectivity.

As he aged, Krause began to lose his eyesight, which is reflected in the mood and style of his later self-portraits.

== Legacy and recognition ==
Krause's works are included in renowned collections such as the Albertina and the Belvedere Palace in Vienna. His artistic contributions extend beyond painting, and he participated in the art competitions at the 1936 and 1948 Summer Olympics.

== Prizes ==
- 1913 First exhibition participation in the Vienna Secession
- 1914 member of the Viennese secession
- 1919 Collective exhibition – figural composition, portraits, landscapes
- 1925 art prize of the city of Vienna
- 1928 Austrian State Prize
- 1930 gold medal of the city of Graz
- 1931 Reichel Prize and State Medal
- 1934 obtained a title of professor
- 1937 Austrian State Prize, member of the Künstlerhaus
- 1940 Prize of the City of Vienna
- 1941 Anniversary exhibition of the Wiener Künstlerhaus
- 1942 Golden Medal of Honor of the Wiener Künstlerhaus
- 1955 Golden Laurel of the Vienna Künstlerhaus
- 1961 Austrian Cross of Honor for Science and Art
- 1963 Great Golden Medal of Honor of the Künstlerhaus
- 1965 State Prize and Waldmüller Honorary Award
- 1970 Prize of the Federal Ministry of Education and Art, honorary membership of the Wiener Künstlerhaus
