= Kalksburg =

Coordinates: 48°8′24″N 16°14′48″E

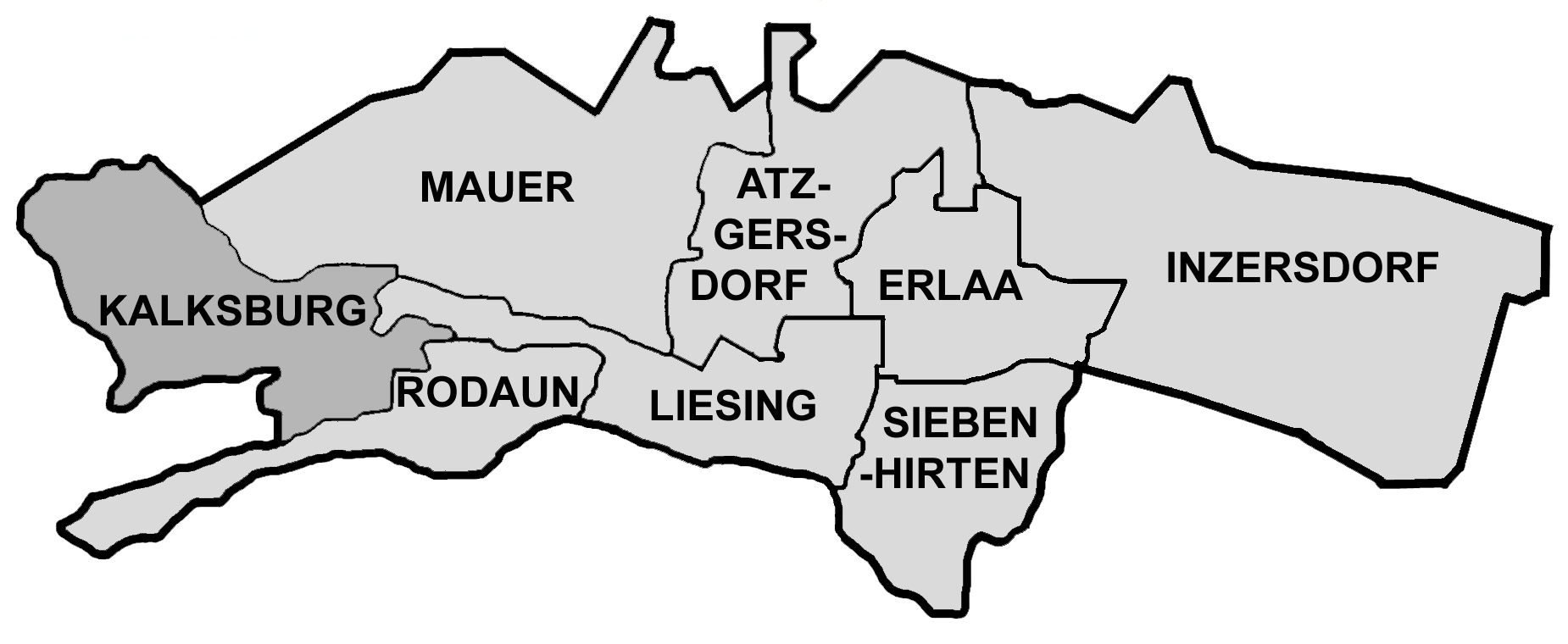
Location of Kalksburg

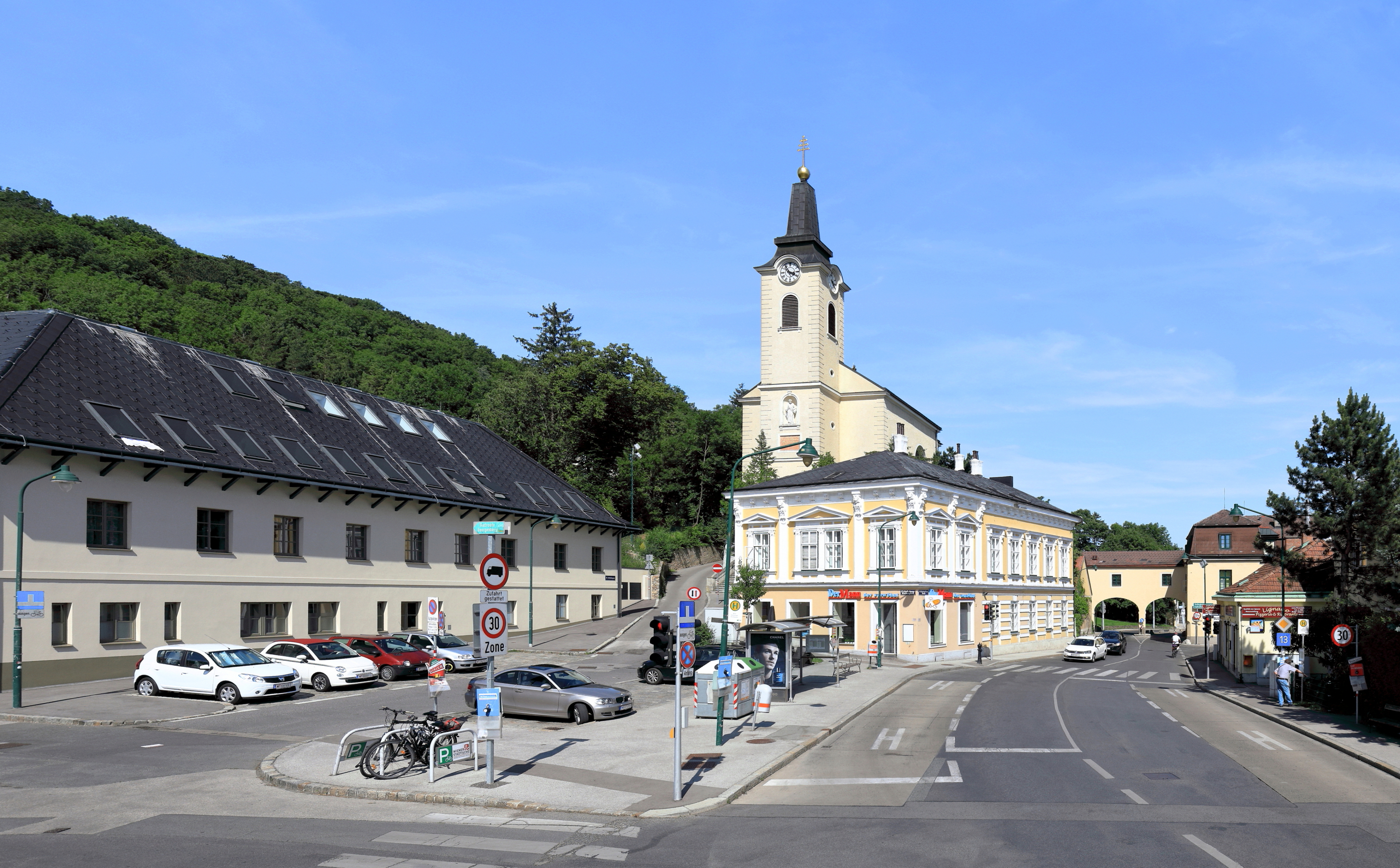
Center of Kalksburg

Kalksburg (German pronunciation: [ˈkalksˌbʊʁk]) is a former municipality in Lower Austria that is now a part of the 23rd Viennese district Liesing.

Today, the cadastral commune Atzgersdorf has got an area of 375,7 hectare.

== Etymology ==
The name Kalksburg stems from the surname of the noble house Chalbsperger – at times, the village also used to be called Kalbsberg, Kalksdorf and Kadoltsperg.

== Geography ==
Geologically speaking, the wooden and meadow area in the northwest of Kalksburg belong to the flysch zone while the one in the northeast belong to the Northern Limestone Alps. The area in between is counted among the geological era of Holocene.

== History ==
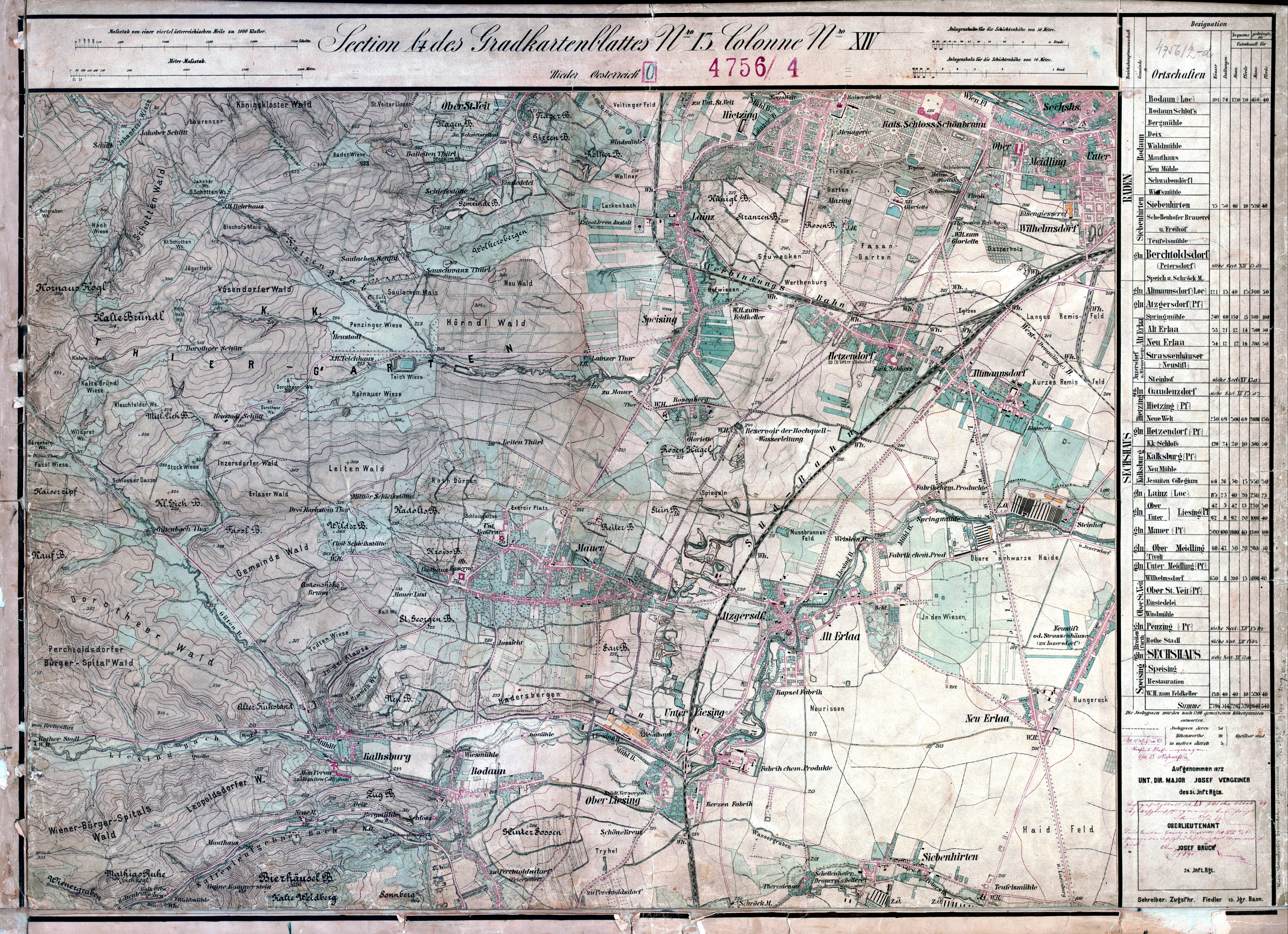
Kalksburg and its surroundings in 1872

- In 1188 the family of the „Chalbsberger“ was mentioned for the first time in a document.
- In 1463 the castle of Kalksburg was destroyed by viennese citizens who were attacking it.
- Between 1609 and 1773, the Jesuits owned the dominion. During the Battle of Vienna in 1683, the village was badly damaged.

== People ==
- Kaspar Benedict Hagleitner (d.1836), chaplain and founder of the Manharter
- Emil Hochreiter (1872–1938), composer (de)
