= St. Nicholas Church, Inzersdorf =

Church building in Liesing, Austria

Coordinates: 48°09′01″N 16°20′49″E

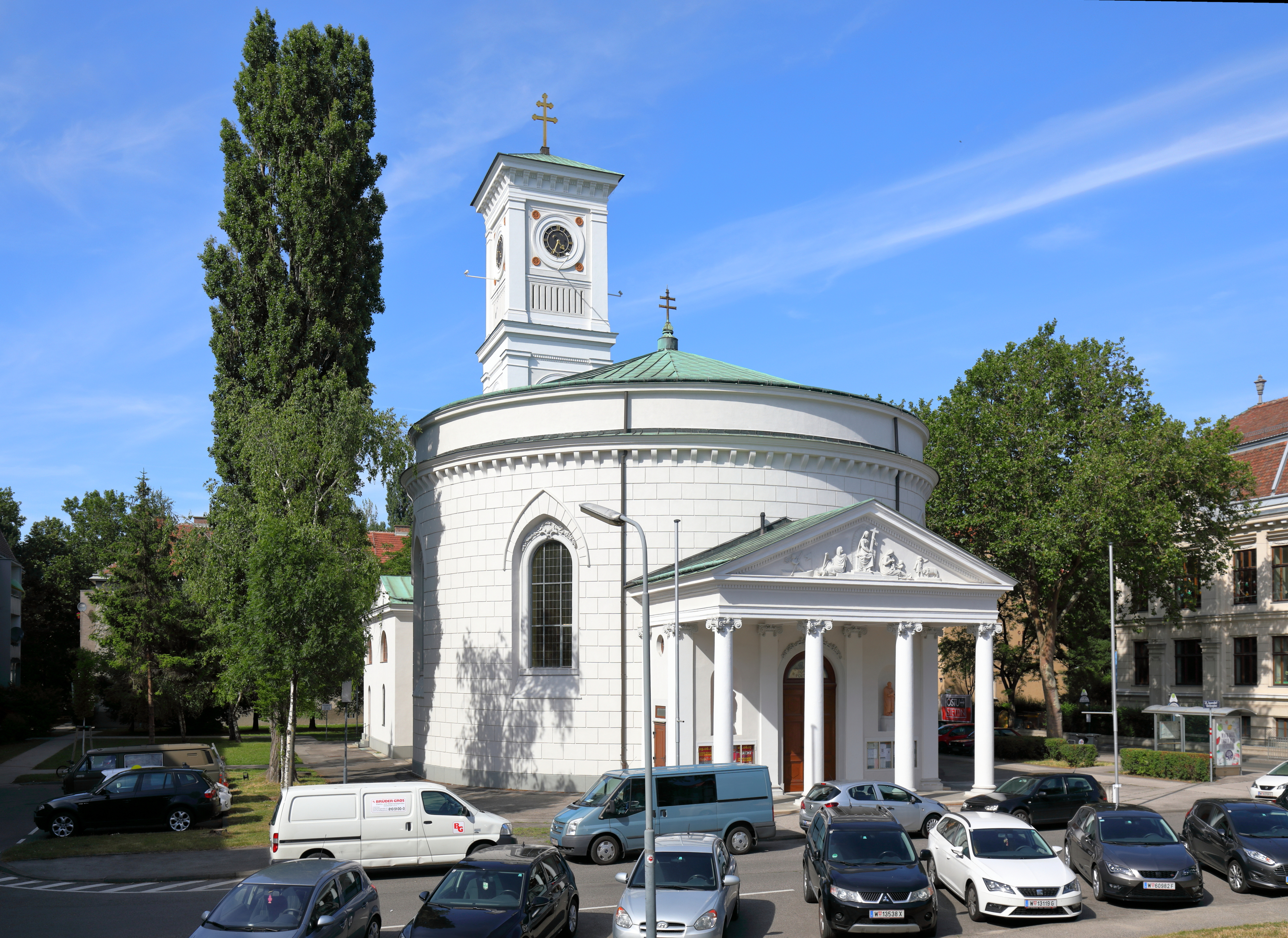
St. Nicholas Church, Inzersdorf

St. Nicholas Church is a Roman Catholic church building in Inzersdorf, Austria.

== History ==
Established in 1217, Inzersdorf has got one of the oldest Catholic parishes in the Greater Vienna area. The gothic predecessor building to today's church was first damaged during the Battle of Vienna and, after being renovated in 1742, was demolished in a fire on 8 June 1817. From 1818 to 1820 the parish church was rebuilt as a classical building. Originally it only consisted of a rotunda covered by a dome and a steeple at the northern end. In 1845-1846 a sacristy, a choir and an Ionic portico were added. Heinrich von Drasche-Wartinberg had a funerary chapel for his family be constructed on the east side of the church in 1860.

During World War II, the church got hit badly and had to be repaired between 1955 and 1960. Another restoration and transformation took place in 1980–1981, when windows designed by Anton Lehmden were implemented. Lehmden also redesigned the Stations of the Cross in 1999.
