= Hermann Beyfuss =

Austrian painter (1857–1898)

- Born: May 7, 1857; Vienna, Austria-Hungary
- Died: March 2, 1898 (aged 40); Vienna, Austria-Hungary
- Education: Academy of Fine Arts Vienna; Academy of Fine Arts Munich
- Known for: Genre painting, portraits

Hermann Beyfuss (also Beyfus; 7 May 1857 – 2 March 1898) was a painter from Austria-Hungary.

== Life ==
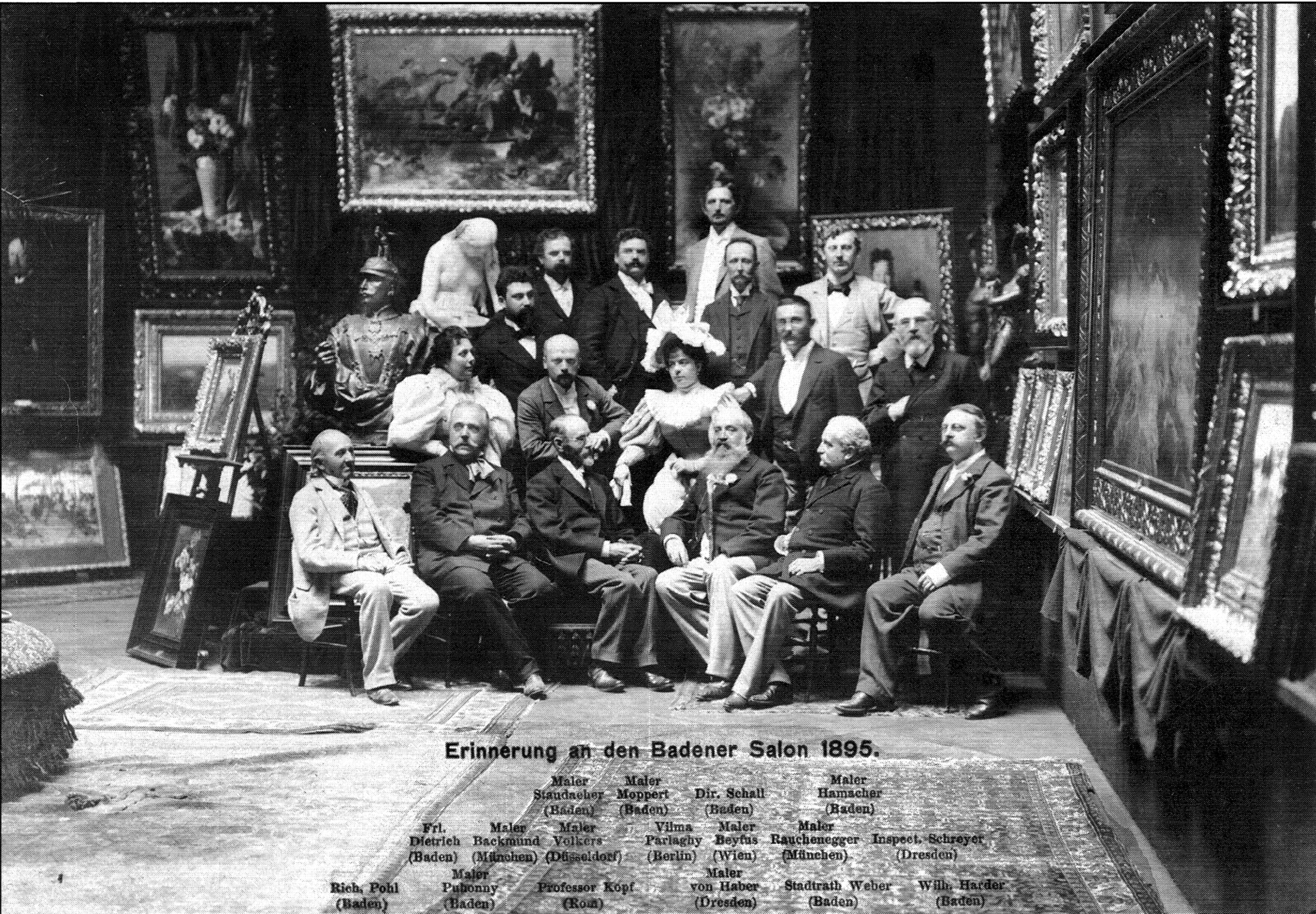
Photograph of a group of artists who exhibited works in Baden-Baden, in the Badener Salon (1895)

Hermann Beyfuss was born in Vienna on 7 May 1857. He studied from 1874 at the Academy of Fine Arts, Vienna under Christian Griepenkerl and Carl Wurzinger; he also studied at the Academy of Fine Arts, Munich. He was active in Vienna; and in 1885 became a member of the Vienna Künstlerhaus, where he exhibited mainly genre scenes and portraits. He died in Vienna on 2 March 1898.

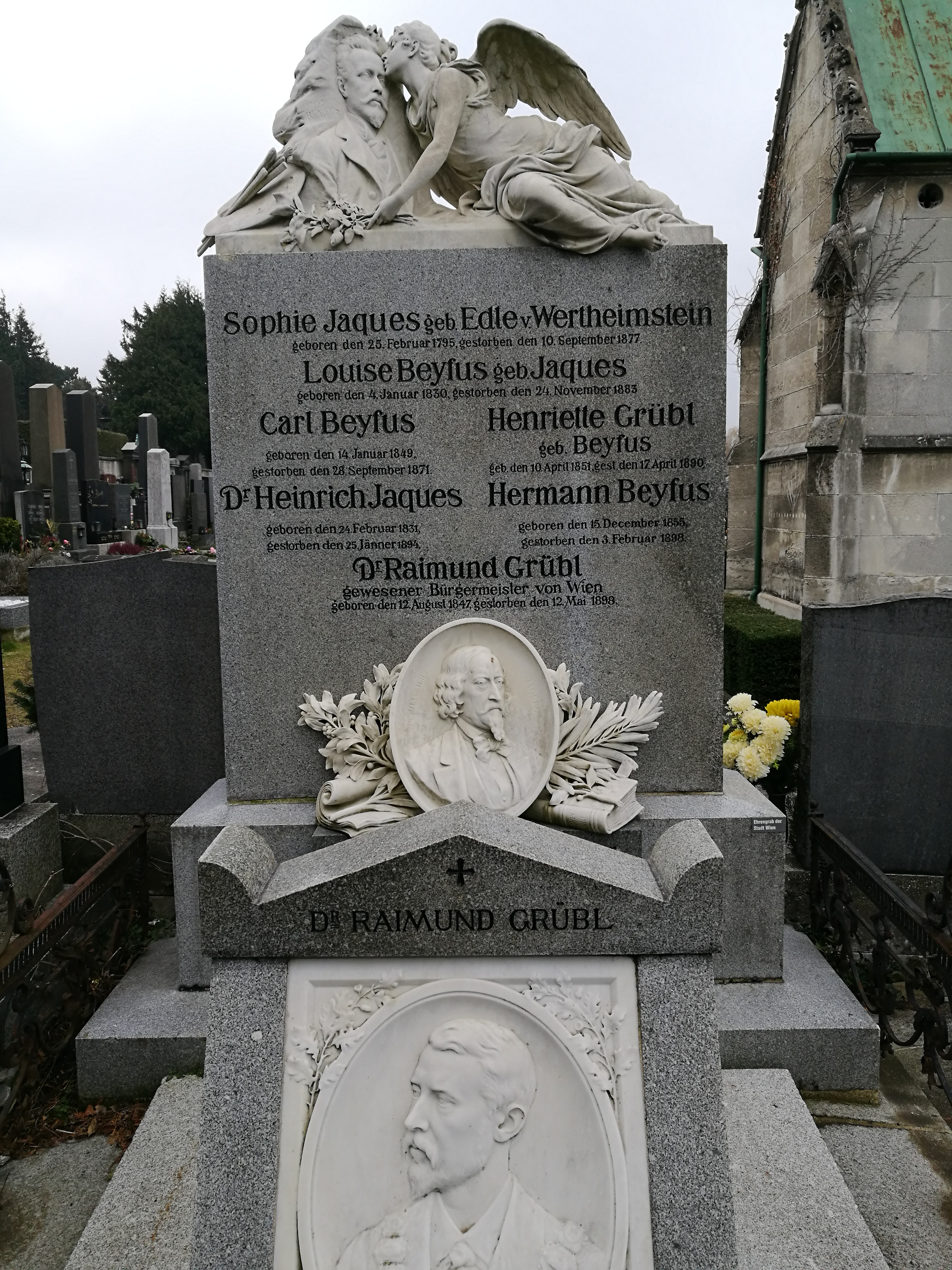
Grave of Raimund Grübl, Heinrich Jaques and Hermann Beyfuss at the Hietzing Cemetery, Vienna

== Beyfusgasse ==
Beyfusgasse (lit. 'Beyfus-alley'), a Viennese street in Inzersdorf, Liesing, was named in 1954 after the painter. It was previously called Siedlergasse.

== Gallery ==
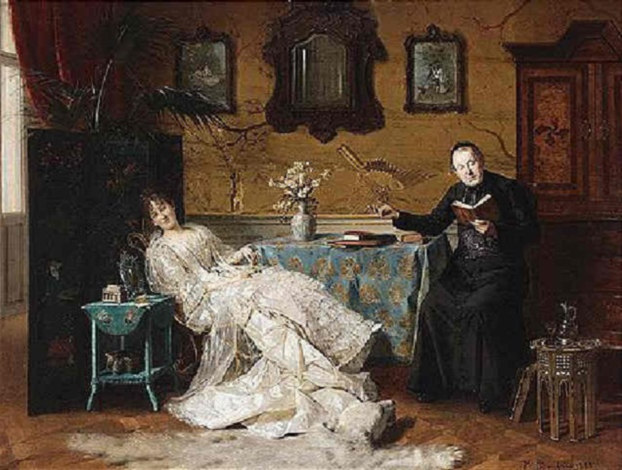
Die Lesestunde (1888)

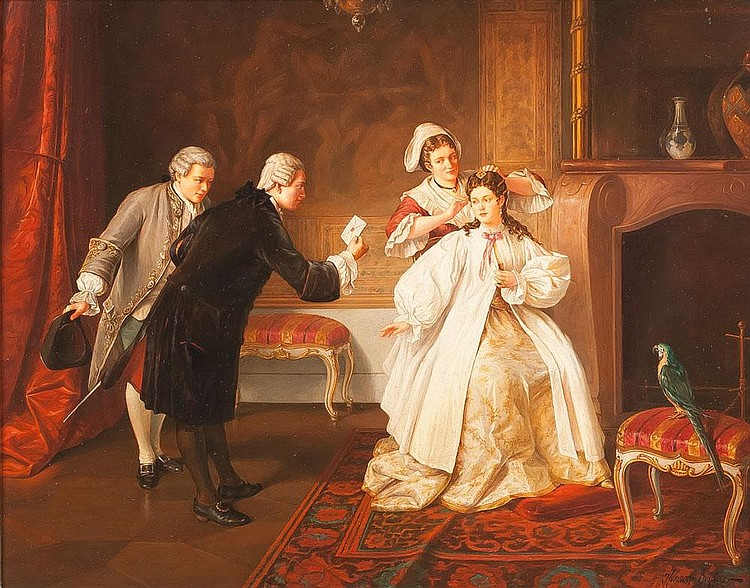
Briefübergabe im Salon

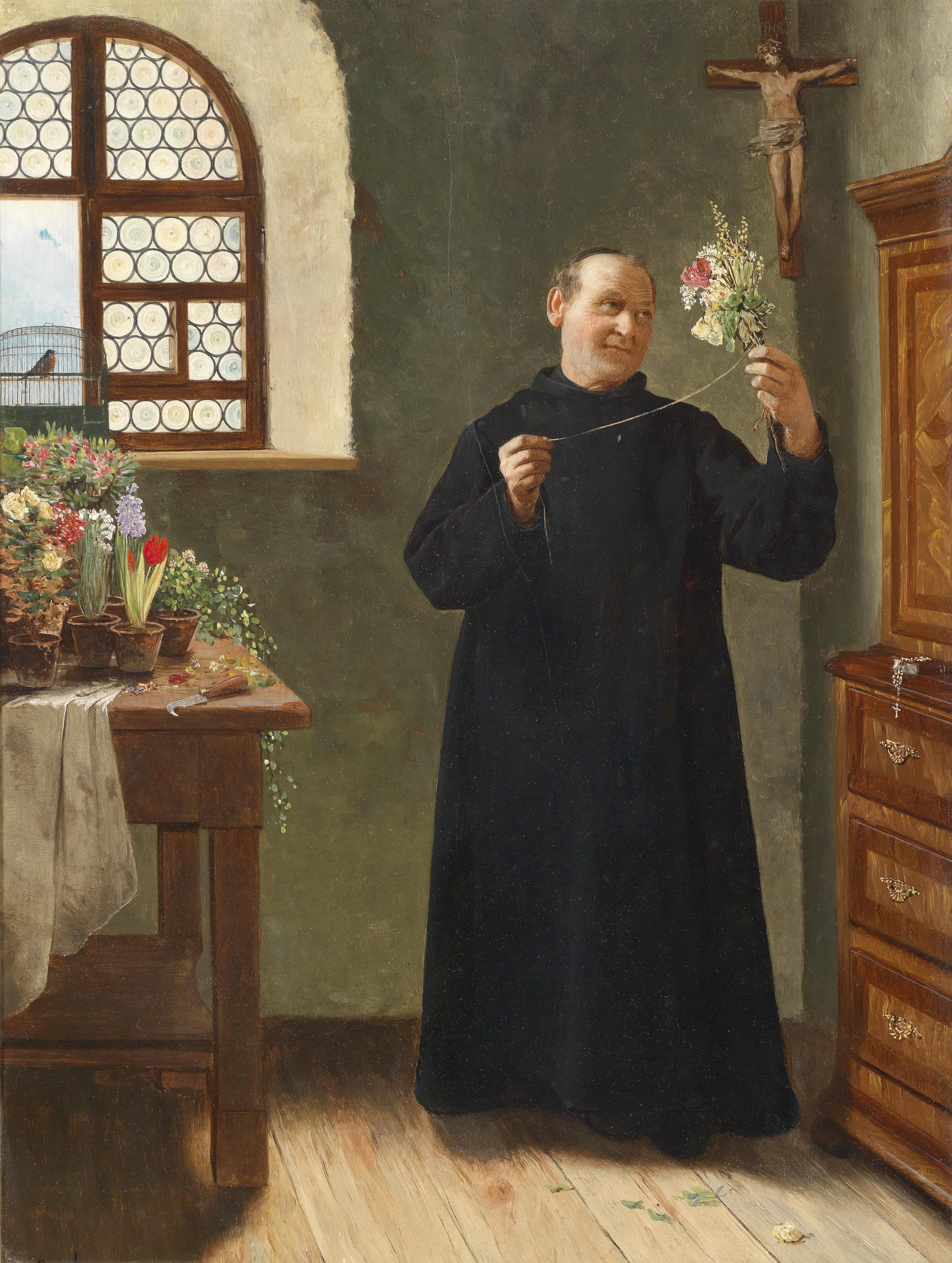
Der Blumenliebhaber

== Sources ==
- Autengruber, Peter (2014). Lexikon der Wiener Straßennamen. Bedeutung, Herkunft, Hintergrundinformation frühere Bezeichnung(en). 9th ed. Vienna: Pichler-Verlag. p. 48.
- Trier, Dankmar (2021). "Beyfus, Hermann". In Beyer, Andreas; Savoy, Bénédicte; Tegethoff, Wolf (eds.). Allgemeines Künstlerlexikon - International Artist Database - Online. Berlin, New York: K. G. Saur. Retrieved 14 October 2022.
- Thieme, Ulrich; Becker, Felix, eds. (1909). "Beyfus, Hermann". In Allgemeines Lexikon der Bildenden Künstler von der Antike bis zur Gegenwart. Vol. 3: Bassano–Bickham. Leipzig: E. A Seemann. p. 571.
