= Austria–Bhutan relations =

Austria–Bhutan Relations
- Austria: Bhutan

Diplomatic mission
- Austrian Embassy New Delhi: Permanent Mission of Bhutan to the United Nations in Geneva

Austria–Bhutan relations are the bilateral relations between Austria and Bhutan. Austria maintains a formal relation with the Kingdom of Bhutan with a non-resident embassy housed in New Delhi. Bhutan is represented in Austria by its permanent mission to the United Nations in Geneva. Bhutan also has two honorary consuls within Austria, one in Vienna (currently vacant) and the other one in Tirol and Vorarlberg.

== History ==
While informal ties existed between Austria and Bhutan when Bhutan bought haflinger horses from Austria for crossbreeding in 1968, formal diplomatic ties between the two countries began on 26 April 1989 in a joint communique. This was followed by the signing of an "Agreement between the Austrian Federal Government and the Royal Government of Bhutan on Technical Co-operation” by Austrian Ambassador Christoph Cornaro and Bhutanese diplomat Dasho Chenkyab Dorji on 10 May 1989.

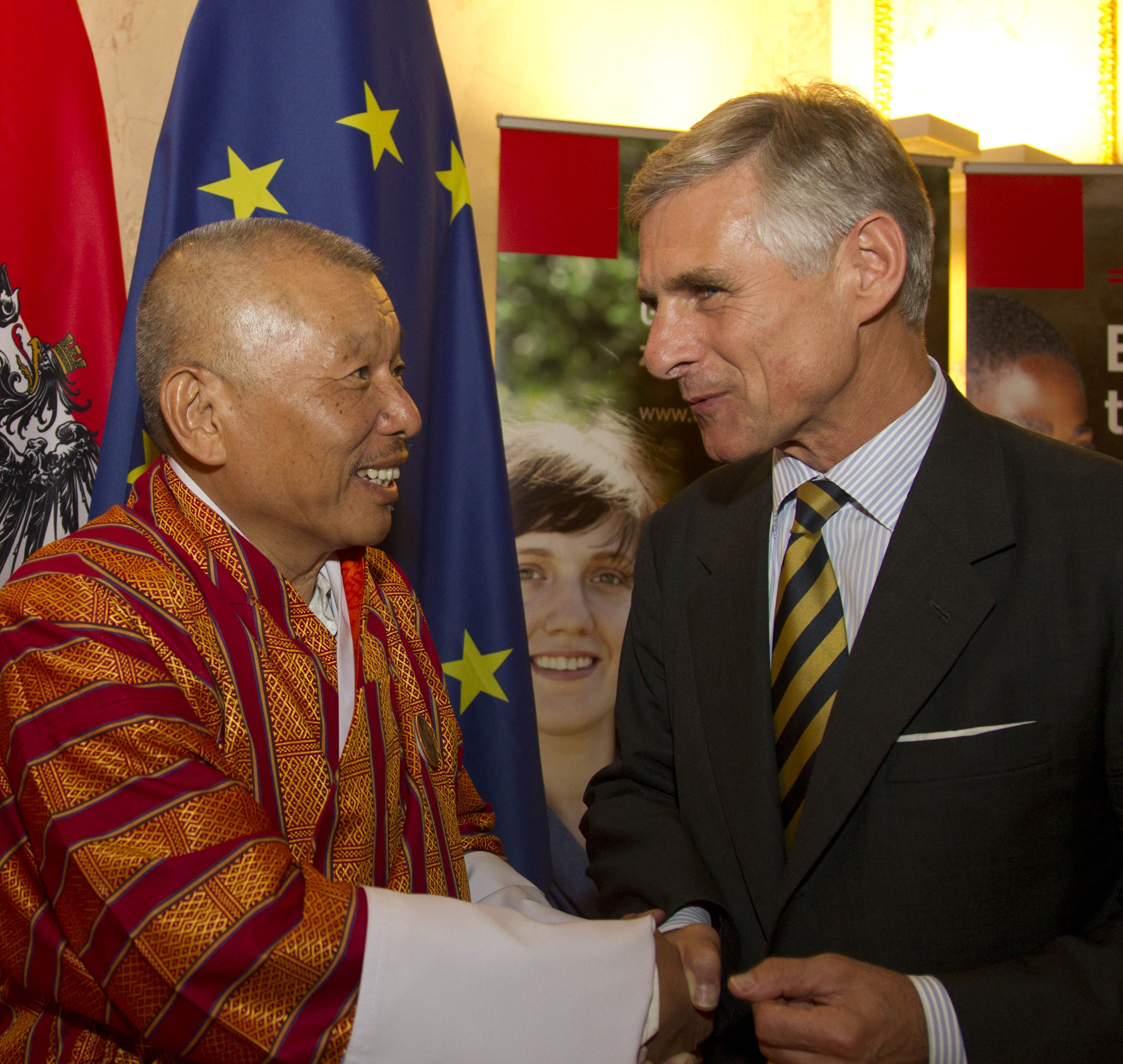
The 25-year diplomatic anniversary celebration between Austria and Bhutan.

In 1992, the Austrian Development Agency (ADA) set up a field office in the capital city of Bhutan, Thimpu. Bhutan has had derived technology related to renewable energy, forestry and agriculture and tourism. The ADA has supported numerous developmental projects in Bhutan ranging from governance to energy as well as poverty reduction. A coordination centre of the Austrian Development Agency was also set up in Thimpu in 1994 aimed at supervising and monitoring the developmental projects in Bhutan.

There have been several high level visits by the leaders of the two countries. In 2014, to celebrate the 25-year anniversary of diplomatic ties, the then Bhutanese Economy Minister Norbu Wangchuk and then Bhutanese Speaker of Parliament Tshering Tobgay visited Austria to meet the then Austrian President Heinz Fischer. Between October 2016 and 2018, a high level economic meet was conducted by both the countries where the then President of the Tourism and Leisure Industry Branch of the Austrian Economic Chamber Petra Nocker-Schwarzenbacher held talks with the then Prime Minister of Bhutan Tshering Tobgay. In March 2018, the then Prime Minister of Bhutan Tshering Tobgay visited Austria following an invitation by Andritz AG. He also held a meeting with the Foreign ministry of Austria. The most recent talks were conducted in February 2019 when the Foreign Minister of Austria Karin Kneissl visited Bhutan to attend the celebration of the 30-year anniversary of diplomatic ties. The final phase of the strategic development agreement for the period of 2019-2023 was also signed in this meet.

== Economic relations ==
As of 2022, the Austrian Development Agency operates a total of six active projects in Bhutan out of which three are in governance and civil sector, two are in energy sector and one is in the environmental protection sector. All the active six projects have received a total funding of EUR 5,653,750. Austria has helped Bhutan in the construction of Rangjung and Basochhu hydropower stations by assisting technically and financially. It has also helped Bhutan in the electrification of rural areas and the construction of courts.

Both the countries had signed a strategic agreement for the period of 2010 to 2013 and then again for 2013 to 2015 improving human rights, condition of women and other factors. The countries signed the final phase of the agreement for 2019 to 2023. Bhutan is expected to become a middle income country by 2023 and the Austrian Development Agency is preparing to phase out assistance at the end of 2023. According to the Embassy of Austria in India, a total of EUR 85 million has been sent to Bhutan as developmental aid since 1994.

== Friendship associations ==
Friendship associations established by common citizens also exist in the two countries. Austrian citizens operate Friends of Bhutan Association and Austrian-Bhutan Society (ABS) in Bhutan. Both the associations undertake community and public welfare works. Bhutanese citizens operate the Society of Friends of Bhutan in Austria to improve the living conditions of monks in Austria.

== See also ==
- Foreign relations of Austria
- Foreign relations of Bhutan
