= Heinrich von Drasche-Wartinberg =

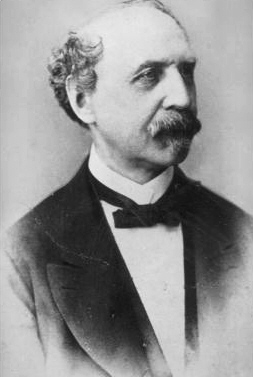
Heinrich von Drasche-Wartinberg.

Heinrich von Drasche-Wartinberg (19 April 1811 – 24 July 1880) was an Austrian industrialist.

== Life ==
After the death of his uncle Alois Miesbach in 1857, Drasche inherited a brickyard located in the south of Vienna. During the next decades he built up Austria-Hungary's leading brick producing enterprise which today still exists under the name of Wienerberger. Around 1830, Heinrich's father Alois established the first continuously firing kilns for bricks and introduced subsequently new types of bricks. While Drasche had big influence onto the building industry in Austria-Hungary and was ennobled by Franz Joseph I, his workers had to bear with comparatively bad labour conditions. Because of that, Drasche was one of the main targets of the sociocritical reports of Viktor Adler.

When Drasche died in 1880, his son Richard took over the company.

== Aftermaths ==
A couple of localities in the south of Vienna are named after Drasche, for example the Draschestraße (Drasche Street) in Inzersdorf. The two châteaux that had been in the possession of Drasche were damaged by bombings in the Second World War and knocked down in 1965 when the motorway A 23 "Südosttangente" was built. The former palace garden is used today as a public park under the name of Draschepark. The St. Nicholas' Church in the centre of Inzersdorf harbours a funerary chapel where Drasche and his family are buried.

== Bibliography & Further reading ==
- Gustav Otruba (1959). "Drasche von Wartinberg, Heinrich". Neue Deutsche Biographie (in German). Vol. 4. Berlin: Duncker & Humblot. p. 103.
- "Drasche-Wartinberg Heinrich von". In: Österreichisches Biographisches Lexikon 1815–1950 (ÖBL). Vol. 1, Austrian Academy of Sciences, Vienna 1957, p. 198.
- Heinrich von Drasche-Wartinberg in Austria-Forum (in German) (at AEIOU)
