= Adelheid Popp =

Austrian feminist and socialist (1869–1939)

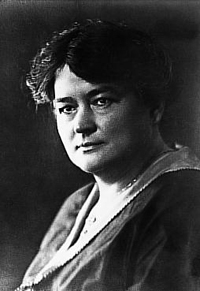
- Adelheid Popp, 1892
- Born: Adelheid Dworschak; 11 February 1869; Inzersdorf, Austria
- Died: 7 March 1939 (aged 70); Vienna, Austria
- Occupations: Politician journalist activist
- Known for: Leader of the women's movement of Austria; Served in the Parliament of Austria
- Spouse: Julius Popp (m. 1894; died 1902)
- Children: Julius, Felix

Adelheid Popp (née Dworschak; 11 February 1869 – 7 March 1939) was an Austrian feminist and socialist who worked as a journalist and politician.

== Early life ==
Adelheid Dworschak, was born 11 February 1869, into a poor working-class family in Inzersdorf, Vienna, Austria (now part of Liesing). Out of 15 children, only five survived in the family, and Dworschak was the youngest of the fifteen. Her mother, Anna, was a traditional Catholic. Her father, Adalbert, was a weaver and an abusive alcoholic. Dworschak grew up in a violent environment, and at six years old her father died of cancer, leaving the family poorer than before. She received three years of formal education but was often absent due to familial illnesses. Her mother, who was illiterate, could not write Dworschak letters of absence, leading to her imprisonment for several hours. only to have to leave school at the age of 10 to help support her family. She worked briefly as a domestic worker, as a seamstress' apprentice crocheting handkerchiefs, and finally as a factory worker. In many of these positions Dworschak was exploited or sexually harassed.

In the mid-1880s Dworschak became interested in politics. A friend of her brother introduced her to the working class social movement and social democratic newspapers and literature. She read about how poverty was universal and a product of an unjust society. The living conditions of working-class families were particularly relevant to her life, as Dworschak had grown up impoverished and been exploited by employers., In 1889 she attended her first public meeting for the Social Democratic Workers Party, with her brother. She was the only woman at the meeting.

== Political work ==
=== 19th century ===
Dworschak became active in the Social Democratic Workers Party, and in 1891 she became the party's first female public speaker and official delegate. In 1891, Dworschak joined (Note: Some sources, including Lane and Lafleur, state that she founded the organization.) the Working Women's Educational Association, which was founded by women active in the social democratic movement in 1890. She would give her first speech at a meeting for the association, inspired by a speaker describing women's working conditions. Dworschak stood up and shared her own experiences and demanded the need for women's education. After her impromptu speech, the audience, mainly men, applauded and requested written copies of the speech. She became the editor-in-chief of the social women's newspaper, Die Arbeiterinnenzeitung, in October 1892. In 1893, when Dworschak appeared at the International Socialist Workers Congress, Dworschak was considered a "Wunderkind" and was admired by prestigious socialists Victor Adler, August Bebel, and Friedrich Engels. Dworschak organized the first strike for women's clothing workers in Vienna.

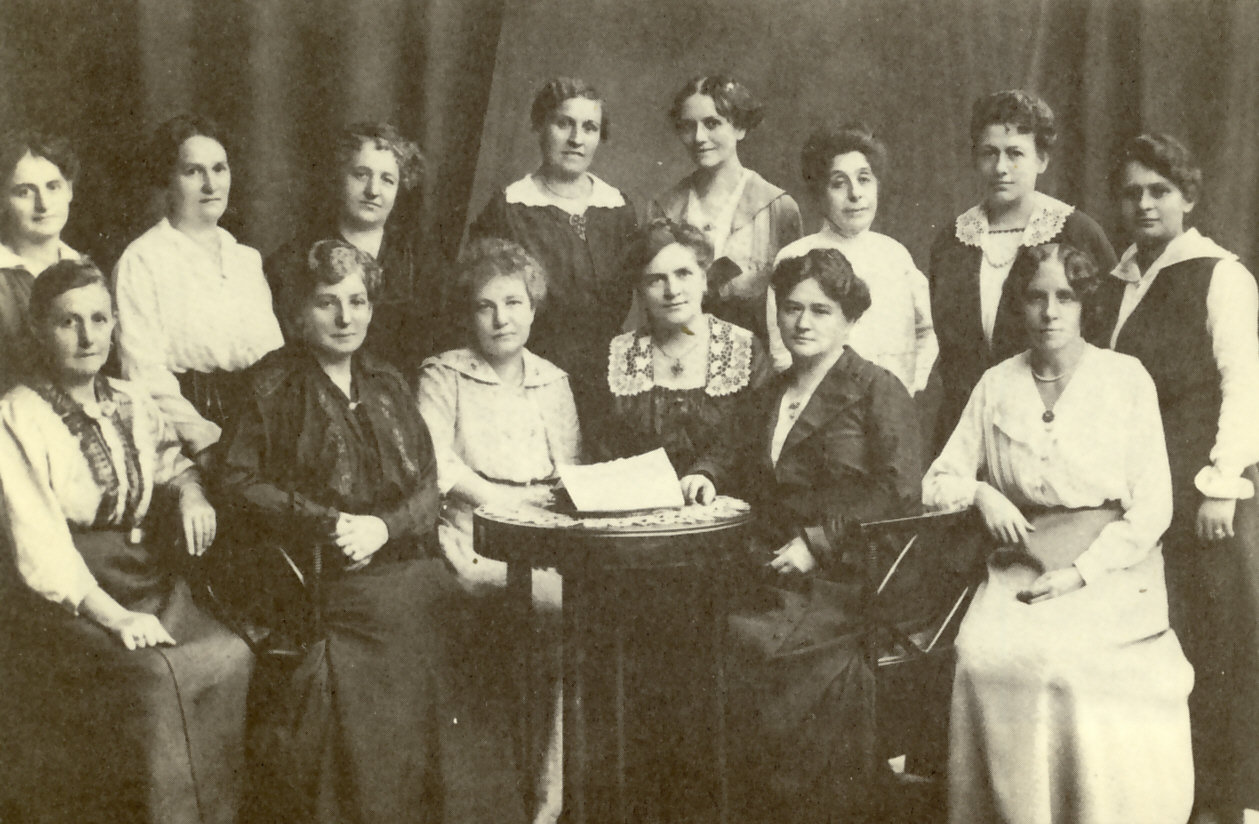
Photograph of the Frauenreichskomitee (National Women's Committee) in 1917. Popp is in the front row, second from the right

In 1894, Dworschak married the party's secretary, Julius Popp. Julius Popp was sickly and twenty years her senior, but they reportedly had a loving relationship and supported each others' work. They had two sons together. One, Julius, was reported missing in action during First World War in 1916 and the other, Felix, died of influenza at twenty-four in 1924.

In 1898, Dworschak was appointed to the Frauenreichskomitee (National Women's Committee).

For the SDAP, Dworschak advocated for a quota, which required a certain number of women's votes during decision making in the Party. She criticized trade unionists for demanding that membership of women's organizations had to be limited to union members, when unions weren't allowing female members in general and because so many women worked in the non-union domestic service sector.

=== 20th century ===
In 1902, Julius Popp died, leaving Adelheid a widow.

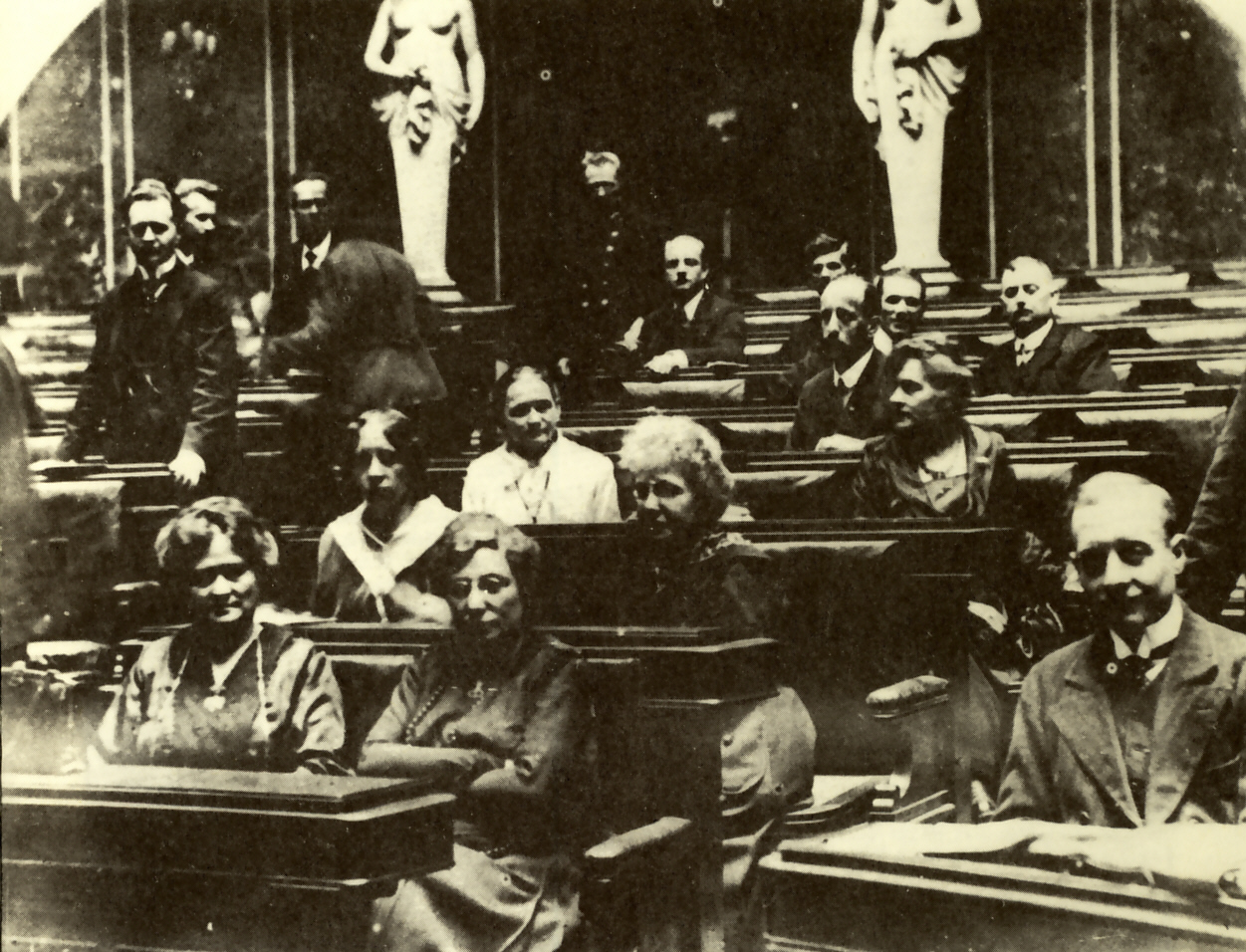
The first women elected to the Constituent National Assembly on March 4, 1919. Popp is on the left in the first row.

Popp entered the 20th century creating the Union of Homeworkers in 1902, followed by the Association of Social Democratic Women and Girls in 1907. In 1904, she was elected to sit on the party's policy-making executive committee, a position she held until 1933. Under Popp's leadership, the Austrian socialist women's movement became one of the largest in the International.

In 1918, Popp was elected to the Vienna City Council. She was elected to the Constituent National Assembly and then, as one of seven female Social Democrats, to the Parliament of Austria in 1919. In this role, she was the first woman ever to speak in the parliament. In this position, she worked to advance social policy and reform, especially in relation to women.

=== Later work and death ===
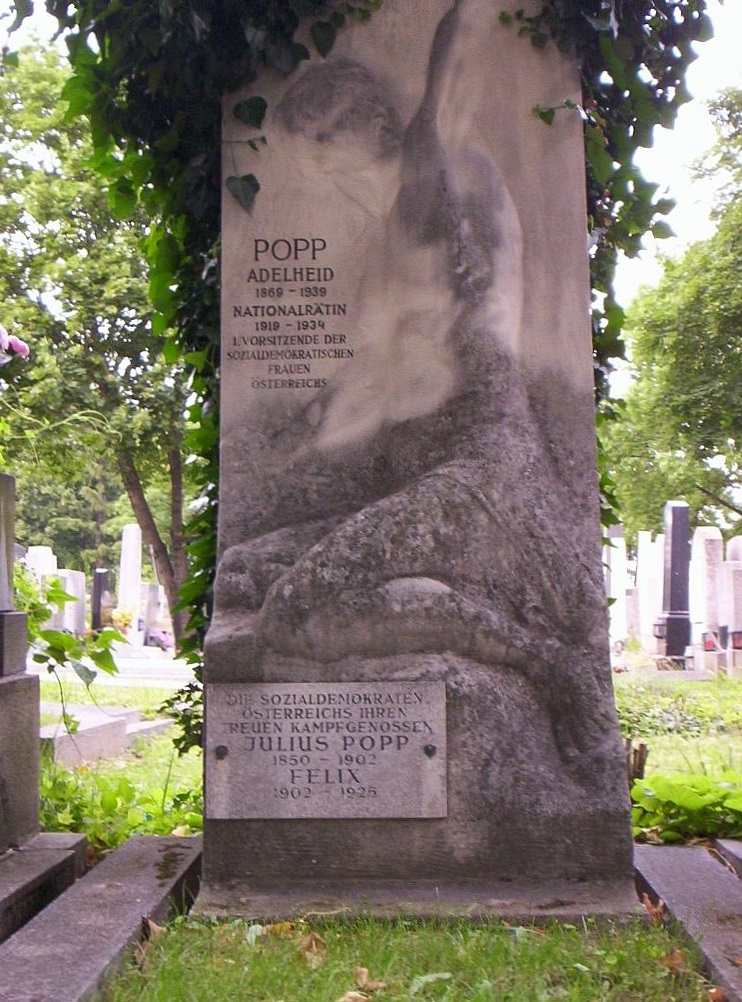
Zentralfriedhof, Vienna - grave of Adelheid and Julius Popp

During her later years in Parliament, she devoted herself to social legislation and women's issues. Popp proposed bills for family law reform, which focused on overturning men's unlimited power as heads of households. She also fought for the legalization of abortion and equal pay. Despite vocal efforts, the majority of her proposals were voted down due to the conservative opposition majority. In the early 1930s she resigned from Parliament. On 7 March 1939, she died from complications from a stroke, in Vienna.

== Writings ==
Socialist leaders encouraged Popp to write an autobiography. In 1909, she anonymously published Die Jugendgeschichte einer Arbeiterin (English: The Autobiography of a Working Woman). This book, which had an introduction by August Bebel, which explored how class and gender shaped her life choices. The book focused on her "miserable proletarian childhood and youth," which was used as the focus for her argument demanding social and political change. The book was one of the most-read works of socialist literature in its time and was reprinted under her name and translated into many languages in the following years. Following her autobiography, was Haussklavinnen (English: Domestic Slaves), in 1912, which was her study on domestic servants. Popp continued to write several other short works.

== Legacy ==
Popp is the namesake of the Adelheid-Popp-Hof in Vienna as housing for unemployed and the Adelheid Popp Park.

Adelheid Popp is a featured figure on Judy Chicago's installation piece The Dinner Party, being represented as one of the 999 names on the Heritage Floor, associated with Susan B. Anthony's place setting.

== Works ==
- The Autobiography of a Working Woman, (published anonymously), Foreword by August Bebel, published by Ernst Reinhardt, Munich 1909, new edition: Dietz 1983, ISBN 978-3-8012-3002-9
- Memories; From my Childhood and Girlhood Years. By Adelheid Popp, Stuttgart: Dietz 1915

== Bibliography ==
- Chicago, Judy. The Dinner Party: From Creation to Preservation. London: Merrell (2007). ISBN 1-85894-370-1
