= Renewable energy in Bhutan =

Renewable energy in Bhutan is the use of renewable energy for electricity generation in Bhutan. The renewable energy sources include hydropower.

While Bhutan has seen great successes with developing its large hydropower projects through technical and financial assistance from India, little or no private sector participation with other forms of renewable energy has been evident. In part because of the Sustainable development goals, Bhutan has established a minimum goal of 20 megawatts (MW) of renewable energy product by 2025, through a mix of renewable energy technologies. Bhutan's Department of Renewable Energy helped formulate and launch its Alternative Renewable Energy Policy in order to promote in Bhutan a mix of clean Renewable Energy (RE) technologies—solar, wind, biomass, geothermal, pico/micro/mini/small hydropower plants up to 25 MW in size and waste-to-energy technologies.

== History ==
Bhutan's commitment to renewable energy started in 1980. Six years later, the first hydropower plant opened in Chukha, followed by a plant in Kurichhu in 2001. Soon after that two more plants opened in Basochhu in 2005 and Tala in 2009. At COP 15 in 2009 (2009 United Nations Climate Change Conference), Bhutan made its first promise to remain completely carbon neutral; they reaffirmed this promise at COP 21 in 2015 (2015 United Nations Climate Change Conference).

== Hydroelectric power ==
Bhutan has significant potential for hydropower, estimated at around 30,000 MW, of which 23,760 MW has been identified as economically feasible. As of 2016, Bhutan's installed hydropower capacity is 1,615 MW.

On-grid hydropower is Bhutan's main energy source. In mountainous rural areas where grid extension is not feasible, off-grid renewable energy has been used to improve access to electricity. Around 4,000 households reside in these remote rural areas.

Bhutan's first step into renewable energy was hydroelectric power. They first started by opening the first hydroelectric power plant in Chukha in 1986. The country now has more plants open: Kurichhu (2001), Basochhu (2005), and Tala (2009). The Mangdechhu hydropower project, a 720 MW run-of-river power plant, was inaugurated in 2019.

Currently approximately 70% of the hydroelectric power Bhutan produces is exported to India saving 4.4 million tons of CO_{2} per year. Despite efforts to expand the types of renewable energy used in Bhutan, hydroelectric power is still the leading source of clean energy in the nation.

== Other forms of renewable energy ==
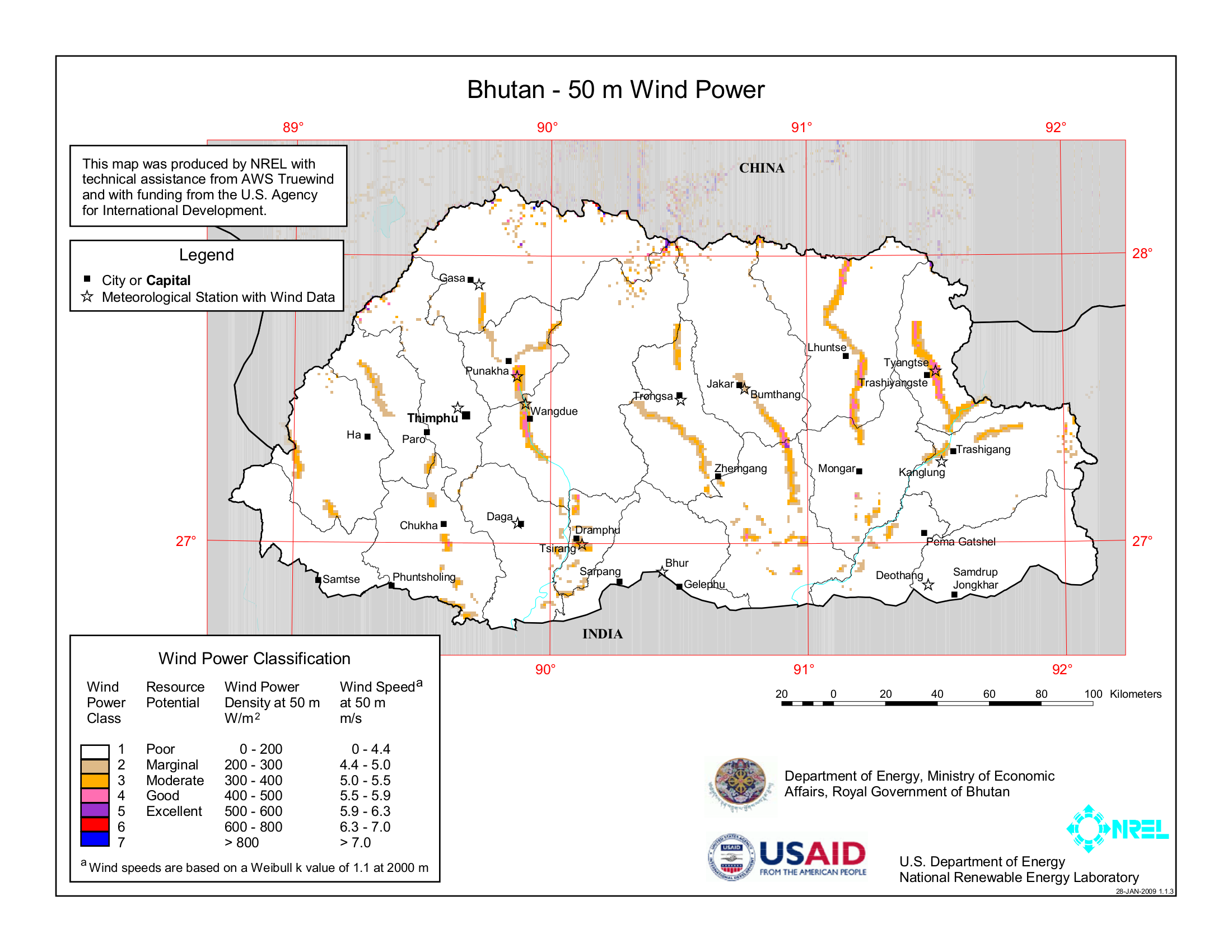

After the 2015 United Nations Climate Change Conference, Bhutan has been moving towards other forms of renewable energy so as to decrease their reliance on hydroelectric power during winter and dry months. Bhutan has increased their focus specifically in the areas of: windmills, biogas plants, solar power, and smaller hydropower plants.

=== Wind energy ===
The initial plan was to install 24 wind turbines, however installation was halted after only two turbines due to citizens raising concerns about possible noise pollution.

Two wind turbines in Rubesa, Wangdue Phodrang, were commissioned in January 2016. These produce a combined 600 kilowatts (KW) of power, sufficient for 100 households.

In 2017, Bhutan's Department of Renewable Energy identified areas near Nyizergang Lhakhang and Gase Tshogom gewog as potential sites for developing wind energy projects.

=== Solar energy ===
Bhutan had a plan to install a 30 MW solar energy plant in Shingkhar in the Bumthang district. But it got cancelled, and currently, a plant is under construction at Yongtru village in Sephu.

=== Biogas ===
There have also been approximately 13,500 stoves and 2,800 biogas plants installed throughout the country.

== Carbon neutrality ==
In an effort to further spread the use of renewable energy and to decrease the country's carbon emissions, Bhutan also provides free electricity to rural farmers; this reduces the amount of fires/gas they use to do their farm work. The government also subsidizes LED light bulbs and electric vehicles.

Currently Bhutan's clean energy exports offset approximately 6 million tons of carbon dioxide.

In a 2016 TED Talk, the Bhutanese Prime Minister Tshering Tobgay spoke about how Bhutan is the only country able to claim the title of "carbon negative." This means that though the nation produces about 2.2 million tons of CO_{2} , the forests offset more than 4 million tons of CO_{2}. They are able to do this because over 72% of their country is under the cover of their forests, a constitutional mandate of the nation.

== Goals and commitments ==
At the 2009 United Nations Climate Change Conference, Bhutan made their first promise to remain carbon neutral; they again made this promise at the 2015 United Nations Climate Change Conference. As of 2016, the clean energy Bhutan exported offset roughly 6 million tons of CO_{2}; it is their goal to export enough clean energy to offset 17 million tons of carbon dioxide by 2020. In his 2016 TED Talk, Prime Minister Tshering Tobgay stated that if Bhutan was able to harness even half of the potential hydroelectric power, they would be able to offset roughly 50 million tons of carbon dioxide, more than the carbon dioxide that New York City produces in one year.

== See also ==
- Energy in Bhutan
