= Liesing =

Coordinates: 48°08′16″N 16°17′04″E

Liesing Liesing (Bavarian)
- 23rd District of Vienna
- Coat of arms

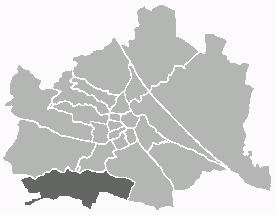
- Location of the district within Vienna
- Country: Austria
- City: Vienna

Government
  - District Director: Gerald Bischof (SPÖ)
  - First Deputy: Harald Gruber (SPÖ)
  - Second Deputy: Gabriele Jell-Wiesinger (independent)
  - Representation (56 Members): SPÖ 24, FPÖ 14, ÖVP 7, Greens 7, NEOS 6, KPÖ 1

Area
  - Total: 32.00 km^{2} (12.36 sq mi)

Population (2016-01-01)
  - Total: 98,385
  - Density: 3,075/km^{2} (7,963/sq mi)
- Postal code: A-1230
- Address of District Office: Perchtoldsdorfer Straße 2 A-1230 Wien
- Website: www.wien.gv.at/bezirke/liesing/

Liesing (German pronunciation: [ˈliːzɪŋ]) is the 23rd district of Vienna. It is on the southwest edge of Vienna, Austria.

It was formed after Austria's Anschluss with Germany, when Vienna expanded from 21 districts to 26. Fifteen Lower Austrian districts, especially the old legal jurisdiction of Liesing, were incorporated into the 25th district.

After the allied, occupation of Vienna, this law was not recognized, and Liesing became a part of Lower Austria in the Soviet occupation zone. In 1946, a law intended to alter the districts of Vienna was vetoed by the occupation authorities. In 1954, the objection was withdrawn. Liesing was one of only two districts that remained in Vienna in the new organization. The areas Breitenfurt bei Wien, Laab im Walde, Purkersdorf, Perchtoldsdorf, Vösendorf, and Kaltenleutgeben returned to Lower Austria.

Since 1954, the 23rd district has been composed of the following former districts: Atzgersdorf, Erlaa, Inzersdorf, Kalksburg, Liesing, Mauer, Rodaun, and Siebenhirten.

== Geography ==
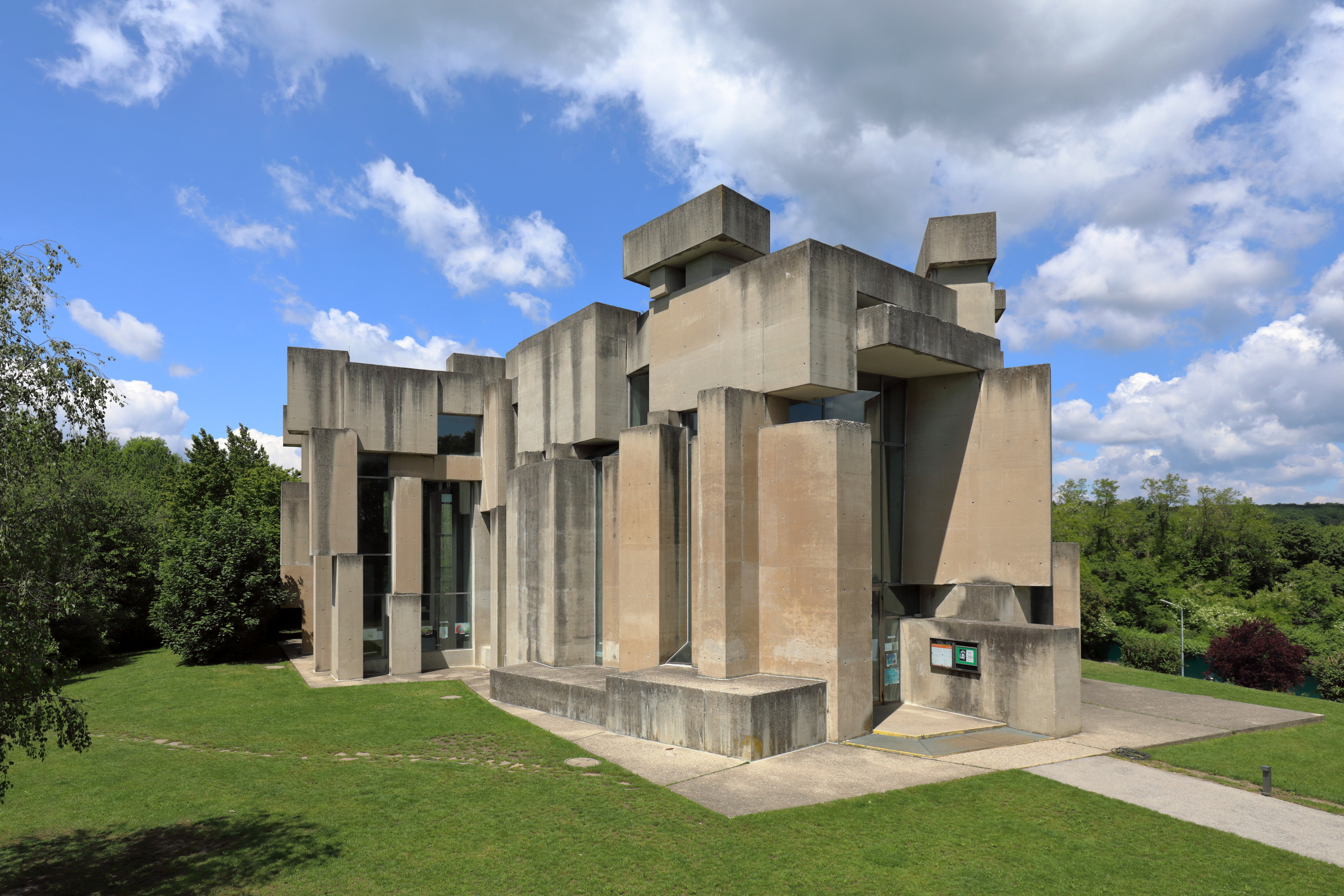
The Wotruba Church on the Georgenberg in the Mauer neighborhood of Liesing

Liesing lies in the southwest of Vienna and borders Lower Austria, along with the districts Favoriten, Meidling, and Hietzing. The district lies along both sides of the Liesing brook and extends from the Vienna Woods into the Vienna Basin. With 7.7% of the total area, Liesing is the fifth-largest district of Vienna, and a third of its natural areas. Areas in the district were threatened by flooding for a long time.

=== Geology ===
Liesing contains three geological regions, including parts of the Vienna Woods and the Vienna Basin. The steep slopes and bare rocks of the Northern Chalk Alps (Kalksteinwienerwald) are located in the southwest of the district and stretch north as far as the Dorother Wald, and in the east, they reach as far as Antonshöhe hill. The chalk zone in Liesing is divided into two sections. The Anhöhe of the Leopoldsdorfer Wald consists of Hauptdolomit, a type of rock formation that stretches in the direction of Kalksburg as far as the Himmelwiese. North of the dolomite zone, there is a wide band of Kieselkalk chalk. In the chalk region can be found the Antonshöhe, where radiolarit for flint cutting edges was mined in the Late Stone Age. North of the Kaltenleutgebner Straße, along the edge of the valley, can be found quarries delivering chalk, mergel, sandstone, etc. for the building industry. To the north are the soft hills of the Flyschzone (Sandstone Vienna Woods). During the formation of the alps, several layers of stone, sandstone, mergel and chalkmergel were deformed. The Laab und Kahlenberg "Decke" is a relic of a sea that stretched from the edge of the alps to the Carpathian Mountains during the Cretaceous Period and early Tertiary Period. At the final stage of the formation of the alps during the Miocene, the sea floor sank, leading to the formation of the Vienna Basin. Today, this area lies mainly east of the edge of the woods. Gravel, sand and sandstone dominate this part of the district. In Atzgersdorf, the "Atzgersdorfer Kalkstein" was quarried for centuries, out of which Sarmatium was produced. In the Liesing area, deposits of tegel were formed during the Miocene and Pliocene.

=== Mountains and rivers ===
The highest elevations are located in the western part of the district, with the Eichkogel at 428 metres (1,404 ft) situated at the southwestern edge, marking the highest point in the district. North of the Reichen Liesing, the Wilder Berg and the Antonshöhe are the highest points. To the east, the hills get progressively lower. While Kroissberg, at 327 metres (1,073 ft), Kadoltsberg and Neuberg hill represent the last areas of the previously extensive wine-producing area, the Wotrubakirche church is located on the Sankt-Georgen-Berg in between. To the north, Liesing borders on the Rosenhügel (in Hietzing) and the Wienerberg hill (in Favoriten).

The most important water course in Liesing has always been the Liesingbach. The "Reiche Liesing" flows from the west through Kalksburg, where it is joined by Gütenbach, which drains part of the Lainzer Tiergarten. Below Kalksburg, the Kalksburger Graben joins the Reiche Liesing underground, before it joins the "Dürre Liesing" to form the "Liesing". The canalization of the Liesing has been recently partially restored to a natural form. In the northern part of the district, the ponds, alte Ziegelteiche, Figurenteich, and Steinsee (the latter being inaccessible to the public), can all be found along the Liesing. South of Siebenhirten is the Schellensee lake, which is also closed to the public.

=== District sections (Bezirksteile) ===
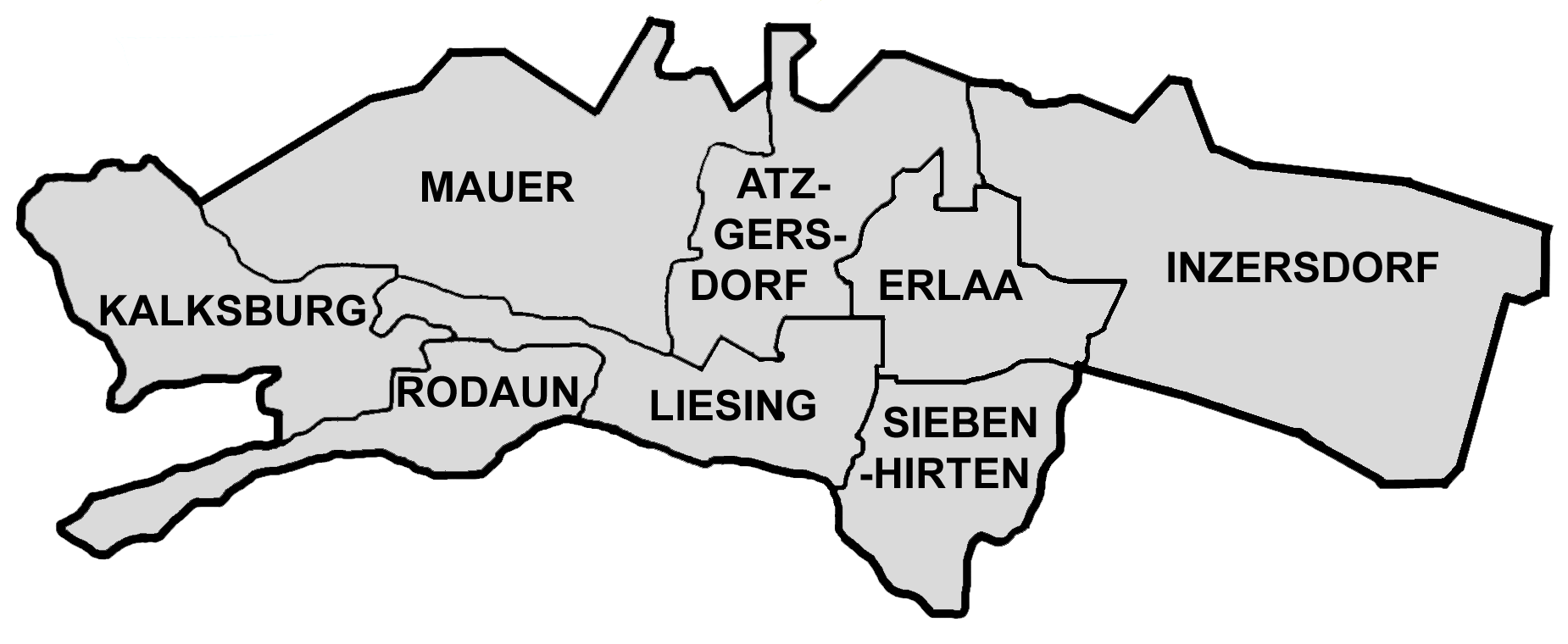
Map of Liesing showing district parts

Sizes of Liesing sections
Section	Size (ha)
Atzgersdorf	376.42
Erlaa	238.96
Inzersdorf	854.06
Kalksburg	375.70
Liesing	273.82
Mauer	639.57
Rodaun	214.45
Siebenhirten	251.22

Liesing was formed from eight previously independent communities. In the east is Inzersdorf, where large industrial and commercial areas are located, as well as the fruit and vegetable market. This was also previously the location of the Inzersdorfer company, named after the district. To the west of Inzersdorf lies Erlaa, which is best known today for the large residential apartment complex, Wohnpark Alt-Erlaa, located north of the old centre of the village. The adjacent Siebenhirten, to the south, is primarily residential and is connected to the U-Bahn on the U6 line by the terminal station of the same name. The Liesing industrial park is also part of Siebenhirten. West of Siebenhirten is the area of Liesing, which lends its name to the whole district. In addition to the old centre with its town hall (Bezirksamt) and bus & rail connecting point, the eastern part of Liesing is also used for commercial purposes. North of Liesing lies Atzgersdorf, featuring a mix of low-density housing and commercial areas along the railway line, with little access to green areas. In the northwest of the district is the village of Mauer, characterised by low-density housing, vineyards, and the largest share of the Vienna Woods. South of Mauer are Rodaun and Kalksburg, both of which are extensively green and retain largely intact village structures.

== History ==
In 1954, Liesing was incorporated as the 23rd District, combining 8 former district municipalities: Atzgersdorf, Erlaa, Inzersdorf, Kalksburg, Liesing, Mauer, Rodaun and Siebenhirten.

Even before the creation of the district, a municipality existed between the old towns of the territory, with various political groupings in the administration. Since the Middle Ages, connections had been noted. Kadolt the Elder from around Eckartsau, in the 14th century, had formed a certain political unity with the places Erlaa, Kalksburg, Mauer and Rodaun. Also, the parish of Atzgersdorf played a significant role, up to the Josephine reforms, as a regional religious centre of power for surrounding villages. From there, the Catholic residents of Altmannsdorf, Erlaa, Hetzendorf, Liesing, Mauer, Siebenhirten and partly Kalksburg, while having their church buildings, did not have their parishes.

== Politics ==
District Directors from 1954
Person	Dates
Johann Radfux (SPÖ)	1954–1962
Reinhold Suttner (SPÖ)	1962–1968
Hans Lackner (SPÖ)	1968–1983
Heinrich Haberl (SPÖ)	1983–1988
Johann Wimmer (SPÖ)	1988–1995
Manfred Wurm (SPÖ)	1995-2012
Gerald Bischof (SPÖ)	2012–present

The SPÖ has always been the strongest party in Liesing. At the first free votes after World War II, the SPÖ reached 55.3% and the absolute majority, the ÖVP 31.7% and the KPÖ a remarkable 13%. In 1946, Hans Radfux from the Social Democrats, which had followed the former Soviet Union, was appointed District Director. Following this the SPÖ dominated the district and always appointed the District Director.

=== Viennese state election ===
The results of the 2025 Viennese state election for Liesing are as follows:

- Social Democratic Party of Austria (SPÖ): 39.73%
- Freedom Party of Austria (FPÖ): 23.56%
- Austrian People's Party (ÖVP): 10.94%
- NEOS - The New Austria and Liberal Forum (NEOS): 10.30%
- The Greens - The Green Alternative (GRÜNE): 9.82%
- All other lists and parties: 5.66%

== Demographics ==
Population Growth
Data from Statistik Austria

=== Population development ===
The present district area of Liesing, as before World War I, had persistent growth figures, but it lacked comparable, little urbanized areas, such as in Donaustadt or Floridsdorf. Nevertheless, the still independent communities could triple their population of 13,945 (1869) to 38,047 (1910). Then, the population stagnated after the end of the second world war. After the communities were finally joined in 1954 to form the District of Liesing, part of Vienna, the population began to rise again continuously. The strongest growth spurt was in the 1960s. Through the rebuilding of areas between the old village cores with modern residential properties, the population rose to 2006, with 89,986 people. Nevertheless, Liesing is still the most under-populated district of Vienna. In 2005, only three districts were as thinly populated as Liesing, with 2741 inhabitants/km^{2}.

=== Population structure ===
The population structure of Liesing in 2005 was mainly in line with the average for Vienna, although the age group between 55 and 74 was significantly over-represented. The number of children under 15 years of age was 14.8 percent of the district population, while the average of Vienna was 14.6%. The proportion of the population between 15 and 59 years was 60.7% (Vienna: 63.4%), which is below the average, while people aged 60 or more years accounted for 24.6% (Vienna: 22.0%) of the district population.

The gender distribution in the district in 2001 was 46.6% men and 53.4% women. The number of married individuals in the population was 44.7%, compared with 41.2%, which is above the average for Vienna.

=== Origin and language ===
The proportion of foreign population, in 2005, amounted to 8.9 percent (versus Vienna citywide: 18.7%). This was the lowest value of a Vienna district. As in the entire state, the proportion of foreigners has grown, as in 2001, the proportion was at 6.7 percent. The highest proportion of foreigners in 2005 was citizens from Serbia and Montenegro, with a 1.7% share of the district population. Another 1.1% were German, 0.8% Turkish, 0.7% Polish and Croatian 0.6% respectively, Bosnian citizens.

As a whole, in 2001, 14.2% of the district population was not born in Austria. Nearly 2.4% reported their common language as Serbian, 1.6% as Turkish, and 1.4 as Croatian.

=== Religion ===
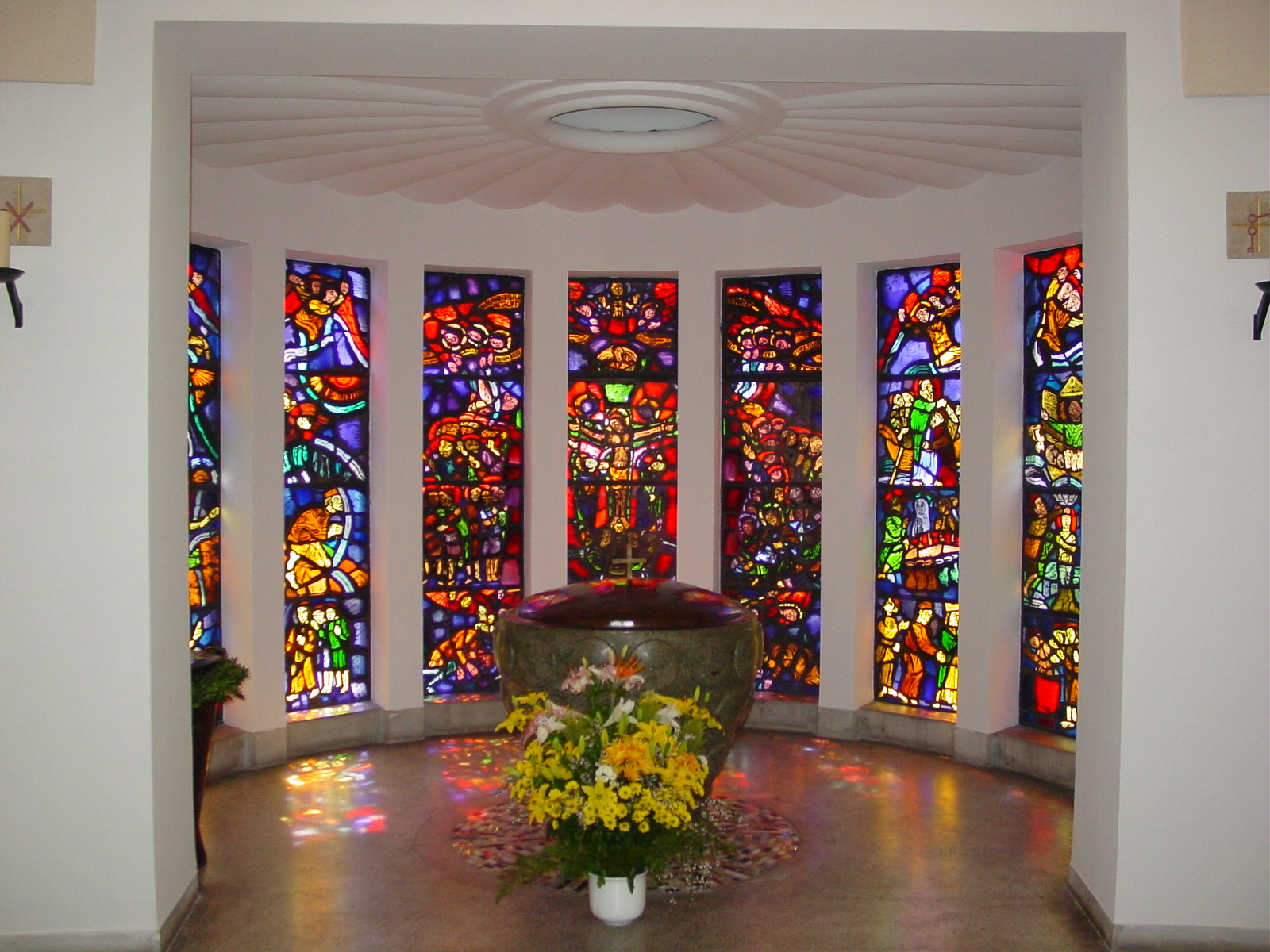
Baptismal Chapel in the Roman Catholic parish church of Liesing

Liesing has one of the highest population shares of people with Roman Catholic faith, 55.2%, compared with Vienna overall at 49.2%, due to a very low foreign share. Eleven Catholic Parishes form the town Deconate 23 in the municipality. On the other hand, the proportions of people with Islamic faith, at 3.2%, and those with Orthodox faith, at 2.5%, are both below the average (Vienna citywide: 7.8% or 6%). The proportion of Evangelical people was 6.7% of the district population, the second highest in Vienna. Nearly 27.3% of the district population in 2001 belonged to no religion, which was the 3rd highest value of a Vienna district. Another 5.1% of the population had expressed either no religion or another religion.

== Notable people ==
- Richard Beer-Hofmann, lived in Rodaun
- Franziska Donner, born in Inzersdorf
- Rudolf Edinger, born in Erlaa
- Christian von Ehrenfels, born in Rodaun
- Werner Faymann, lived in Liesing
- Hugo von Hofmannsthal, lived in Rodaun
- Hanns Hörbiger, born in Atzgersdorf and lived in Mauer
- Gisbert Kapp, born in Mauer
- Franz Konrad (1906–1952), SS officer executed for war crimes
- Heinrich Krause, born in Rodaun
- Ludwig von Bertalanffy, born in Atzgersdorf
- Kurt Peters, chemist born in Atzgersdorf
- Adelheid Popp, born in Inzersdorf
- Anton Romako, born in Atzgersdorf
- Karl Skraup
- Leopold Vogl, born in Atzgersdorf
- John Banner
- La Jana, born in Mauer
- Hermann Beyfuss, for whom Beyfusgasse was named in 1954
