= Sephu Solar Power Plant =

Under-construction solar power plant in Bhutan

- Country: Bhutan
- Location: Yongtru village, Sephu
- Coordinates: 27.5170888°N 90.2938349°E
- Construction began: 2022

Solar farm
- Type: Flat-panel PV
- Site area: 65 acres

Power generation
- Nameplate capacity: 17.38 MW
- Annual net output: 25 GWh

Sephu Solar Power Plant is an under-construction photovoltaic power station in Bhutan.

== History ==
Sephu plant will serve as an addition to the 180 kW grid-connected ground-mounted solar photovoltaic power station in Rubesa (near Punakha), which became operational in October 2021. The Sephu plant is currently under construction over an area of 65 acres in Yongtru village, situated in the Sephu Gewog. Upon its completion, the overall installed capacity of the facility will reach 22.38 megawatts and is expected to be complete by March 2025. It was initially planned at 17.38 megawatts.

The Government of Bhutan intends to complete the project by March 2024, at which time it will hand over the plant's operation to Druk Green Power, an electricity provider in Bhutan. The funding for this project has primarily come from the Asian Development Bank. ADB contributed USD 10 million in grants and USD 8.26 million in loans.
