= Kapp =

Kapp or KAPP may refer to:

- Kapp (headcovering), a headcovering worn by many Anabaptist Christian women
- Kapp, Norway, a village in Østre Toten municipality in Innlandet county, Norway
- Kapp Records, a record label
- KAPP (TV), the ABC affiliate (channel 35) for Yakima, Washington, United States
- Kenya African People's Party, a defunct political party in Kenya

Kapp is a surname of German origin. Notable people with the surname include:

- Kärt Jänes-Kapp (1960–2015), Estonian journalist and editor
- Alex Kapp Horner (born 1969), American actress
- Alexander Kapp (German educator and editor) (1799–1869), German editor and educator
- Alexander Kapp (dermatologist and allergist) (born 1955) German dermatologist and allergist
- Andy Kapp (born 1967), German curler
- Ardeth G. Kapp (born 1931), Canadian religious leader
- Artur Kapp (1878–1952), Estonian composer
- Charlie Kapp, German curler
- Christian Kapp (1798–1874), German philosopher
- Colin Kapp (1928–2007), British author
- Dietloff Kapp (1925–1986), German modern pentathlete
- Edmond Xavier Kapp (1890–1978), British artist
- Erhardt Kapp (born 1959), Romanian-American soccer player and coach
- Ernst Kapp (1808–1896), German-American philosopher and geographer
- Eugen Kapp (1908–1996), Estonian composer
- Friedrich Kapp (1824–1884), German-American attorney, author and politician
- Gisbert Kapp (1852–1922), Austrian-English electrotechnician
- Helen Kapp (1901–1978), British artist and curator
- Helmut Kapp (died 1943), Nazi German war criminal
- Jack Kapp (1901–1949), American music entrepreneur
- Janice Kapp Perry (born 1938), American missionary and religious songwriter
- Jerome Kapp (born 1999), American football player
- Joe Kapp (1938–2023), American football player, coach, and executive
- Karl William Kapp (1910–1976), German-American economist
- Luisa Kapp-Young (1835–1919), Austrian dramatic operatic soprano, musical educator, essayist
- Marizanne Kapp (born 1990), South African cricketer
- Mary Eugenia Kapp (1909–1983), American chemist
- Richard Kapp (1936–2006), American conductor
- Uli Kapp (born 1971), German curler
- Villem Kapp (1913–1964), Estonian composer, organist and music teacher
- William Kapp (1891–1969), American architect
- Wolfgang Kapp (1858–1922), German political activist and journalist, leader of the Kapp Putsch

== Käpp ==
- Osvald Käpp (1905–1995), Estonian wrestler

== See also ==
- Kapp Werkzeugmaschinen
- Kopp (disambiguation)
- Capp (disambiguation)
