= Copp =

Copp or Copps may refer to:

== People ==
- Albert James Smith Copp (1866–1912), Canadian politician
- Andrew Copp (born 1994), American ice hockey player
- Arthur Bliss Copp (1870–1949), Canadian politician
- Bob Copp (1918–2006), Canadian ice hockey player
- Charles D. Copp (1840–1912), American soldier
- David Copp, Canadian philosopher
- Dennis Copps (1929–2020), New Zealand cricketer
- Douglas Harold Copp (1915–1998), Canadian scientist
- Ellen Rankin Copp (1853–1901), American sculptor
- Evelyn Fletcher Copp (1872–1945), American music educator
- Frank Copp (1881–1959), Canadian politician
- Harley Copp (1922–1991), American car designer
- J. Homer Copp (1882–1944), American politician
- John Copp (1673–1751), colonial American politician
- Kyle Copp (born 1996), Welsh footballer
- Martha Copp, American sociologist
- Melinda Copp (born 1962), Canadian swimmer
- Michael Copps (born 1940), former Commissioner of the U.S. Federal Communications Commission
- Michael Copps Costello (1875–1936), Canadian printer politician
- Owen Copp (1858–1933), American psychiatrist
- Rick Copp (born 1964), American television writer
- Sheila Copps (born 1952), Canadian politician
- Stanley Copp (1914–1987), Canadian politician
- Stephen Copp (born 1976), Swedish snowboarder
- Terry Copp (born 1938), Canadian military historian and Professor Emeritus
- Theodore Bayard Fletcher Copp (1902–1945), American author
- Victor Copps (1919–1988), Canadian politician

== Other ==
- Certificate of pharmaceutical product, a certificate which establishes the status of a pharmaceutical product
- COPP (chemotherapy), a chemotherapy regimen for treatment of non-Hodgkin lymphoma
- COPP (Combined Operations Pilotage Parties), a defunct British special military unit
- Copps Coliseum, a sports and entertainment venue in Hamilton, Ontario
- Copps Food Center, a supermarket chain in Wisconsin
