= Kopp =

Kopp may refer to:

- Kopp (surname), a surname
- Kopp, Germany, a municipality in Rhineland-Palatinate, Germany
- Kopp, Virginia, an extinct unincorporated community in Prince William County, Virginia, United States
- Kopp Verlag, a German nonfiction publisher specializing in conspiracy theories
- Kopp Glass, Inc., an American glass molding company

== See also ==
- Kopps, a 2003 Swedish film
- Spion Kop (disambiguation)
- Cop (disambiguation)
- Copp (disambiguation)
- Kapp (disambiguation)
