= Otto V. Pence =

American politician (1882–1936)

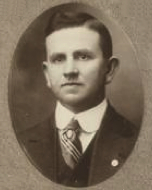

Member of the Virginia House of Delegates from Shenandoah County
- In office 1916–1920
- Preceded by: C. O. Miller
- Succeeded by: J. Homer Copp

Personal details
- Born: Otto Vernon Pence; 1882 Shenandoah County, Virginia, U.S.
- Died: 1936 (aged 53–54) Roanoke County, Virginia
- Resting place: Sager Cemetery, Alonzaville, Shenandoah County
- Party: Republican

Otto Vernon Pence (1882 – October 31, 1936) was a Virginia lawyer and politician who served in the Virginia House of Delegates.

== Early life ==
Otto Vernon Pence was born in 1882, one of three sons born to Jacob and Sarah (Painter) Pence, residents of Timberville before moving to Shenandoah County, where Otto was born.

His father, a widower of three years, was found shot dead on June 4, 1931, at the age of 74. He had been ploughing corn on his son's farm three miles west of Woodstock, and was found by a grandson, Billie Pence, lying next to a .22 calibre rifle. A coroner's investigation could not determine whether or not it was an accident.

Otto had two brothers, one of whom predeceased Otto. The other, Walter Pence, survived Otto.

== Career ==
Shenandoah County voters twice elected Pence as their (part-time) representative in the Virginia House of Delegates, first in November 1915 (for the term that began the following January) and re-electing him in 1917 (for the term that ended September 9, 1919.[6] In November 1919, Shenandoah County voters elected him as their County Clerk.[7]

In 1926, he was elected to the board of directors for the Shenandoah Valley Estates. He served as commonwealth's attorney in Shenandoah County for eight years, and studied law while in this position.

On September 20, 1933, he was made Deputy Clerk of the United States District Court for the Western District of Virginia, working in Roanoke County. The previous Deputy Clerk, Frank H. Hall, had jumped to his death the previous week.

== Personal life ==
He married Eva Lena Peirsel of Uniontown, Pennsylvania. They had at least two children: Jay Peirsel Pence and William G. Pence. On June 23, 1948, Jay married Helen Avis Grimm.

On October 31, 1936, he died at his home in Roanoke County. His funeral was held three days later at Woodstock Lutheran Church, and he was buried in Massanutten Cemetery.

He was a Freemason, and had Masonic rites performed at his funeral.
