= Fritz Wotruba =

Austrian sculptor (1907–1975)

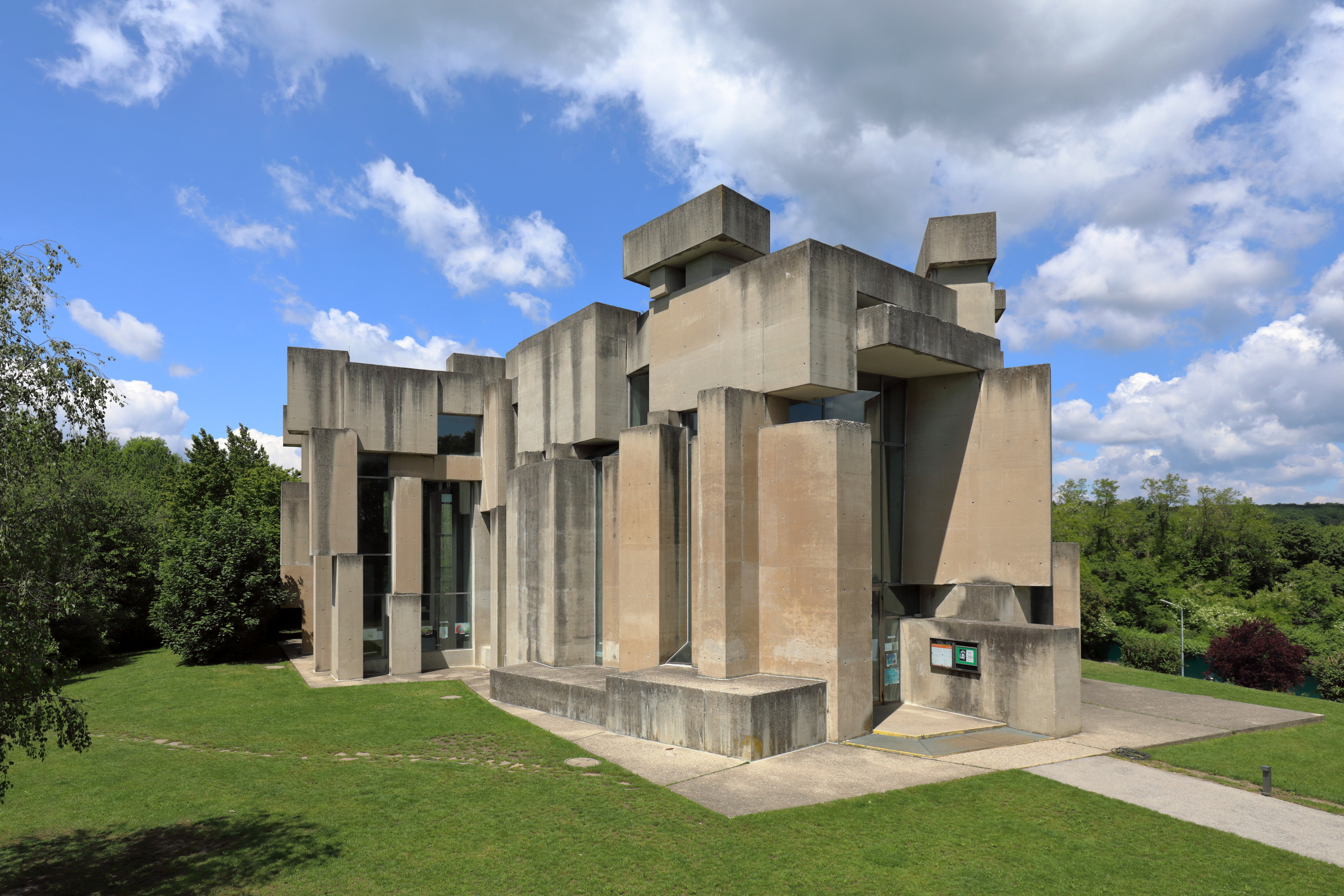
Church "of the Holy Trinity" in Vienna-Mauer

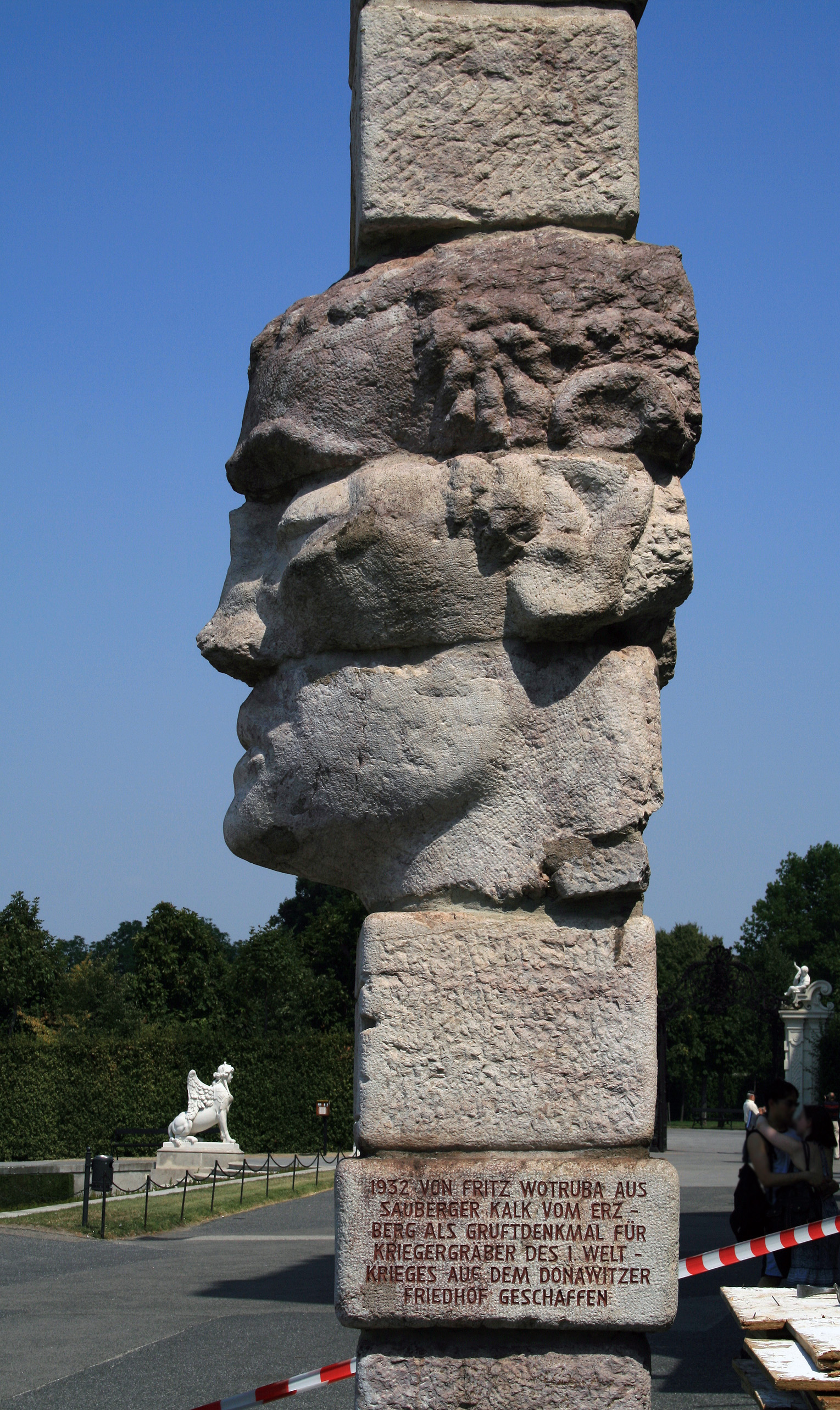
"Mensch, verdamme den Krieg" ("Man, condemn war", 1932)

Fritz Wotruba (23 April 1907, Vienna, Austria – 28 August 1975, Vienna) was an Austrian sculptor of Czecho-Hungarian descent. He was considered one of the most notable sculptors of the 20th century in Austria. In his work, he increasingly dissolves figurative components in favor of geometrical abstraction with the shape of the cube as the basic form.

== Life ==
Fritz Wotruba was born in 1907 as the youngest of eight children of Adolf Wotruba (who came from Bohemia to work as a tailor's assistant) and Maria Wotruba, née Kocsi (from Hungary, working as a maid), in Vienna. Adolf was an alcoholic and violent, often beating his sons and his wife - as described in the auto-biography of Elias Canetti, Das Augenspiel, who befriended him in 1933, writing a very positive assessment of his work in 1954. His eldest brother was imprisoned for armed robbery and murder, and died in prison at Stein on the Danube. Fritz, the youngest, was spared from his father's wrath but was kept under close surveillance by the police due to the police records of his three elder brothers, and Canetti believed that his fascination with sculpting in stone was a form of psychological defence against his traumatic childhood.

== Training and early commissions ==
From 1921 to 1925, he was trained as an engraver, as an apprentice in the engraving and die cutting workshop of Josef Schantin in Vienna.

From February to summer 1926, he attended the arts and trades school of the Austrian Museum of Art and Industry and open evening courses on nude drawing.

In fall 1926, he enrolled in studies in sculpting at the arts and trades school.

Through the end of his studies, he was a student of Anton Hanak, and received a stipend by the Vienna Society of Modern Art, the Austrian Chamber of Labor and the municipality of Vienna - which was obtained for him by the ministrations of Anna Mahler, who was his pupil and lover.

In 1933, he had a studio under the Stadtbahn, or Metro Rail Tracks. Canetti :"..it consisted of two big vaults supporting the Stadtbahn trestle; in one stood figures that would have got in his way while he was working in the other. When the weather wasn't too bad, he liked best to work in the open..." He continued to live at home with his widowed mother and his youngest sister in their old home in 31 Florianigasse, where he had been born, until he escaped after the Anschluss and Hitler's dictatorship over Austria to Switzerland for the duration of the war.

== Work ==
Probably his greatest work, on which he worked until his death, was the planning of the Church "of the Holy Trinity" in Mauer, Vienna, better known as Wotruba Church. He did not live to see the completion of the church in 1976.

Many of his statues can be seen in public parks in Vienna. The Lying Adolescent is located in an exhibition in the Albertina. He escaped to Switzerland upon Hitler's ascent to power. A number of his sculptures were either lost or destroyed during the Second World War.

In 1947, Wotruba was awarded the City of Vienna Prize for Visual Arts and in 1955, he received the Grand Austrian State Prize for Visual Arts.

He is buried in the Vienna Central Cemetery.

== Gallery of Works ==
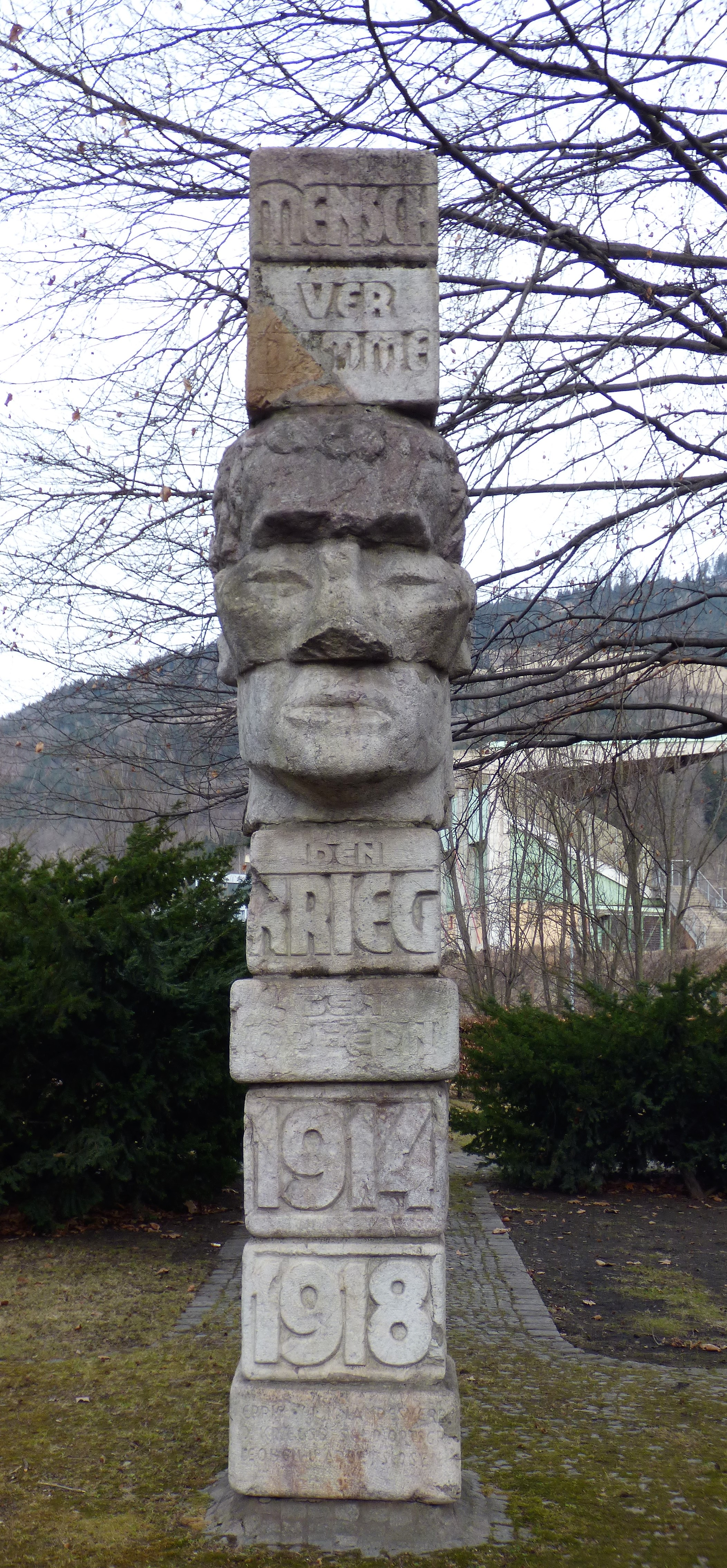
Man, condemn the war (Mensch, verdamme den Krieg), c. 1932; stone sculpture

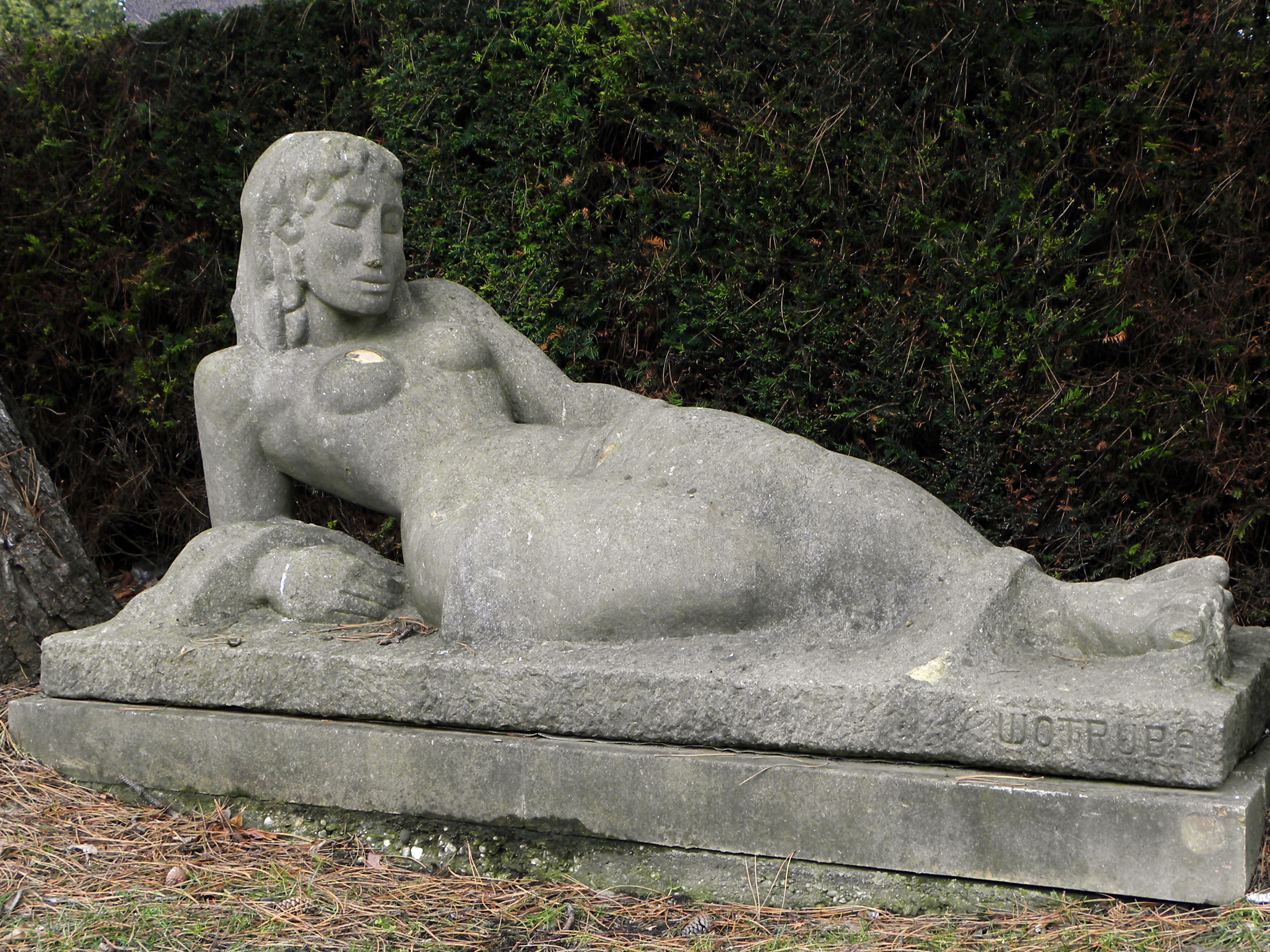
Tomb for Selma Halban-Kurz, 1934–36; stone sculpture

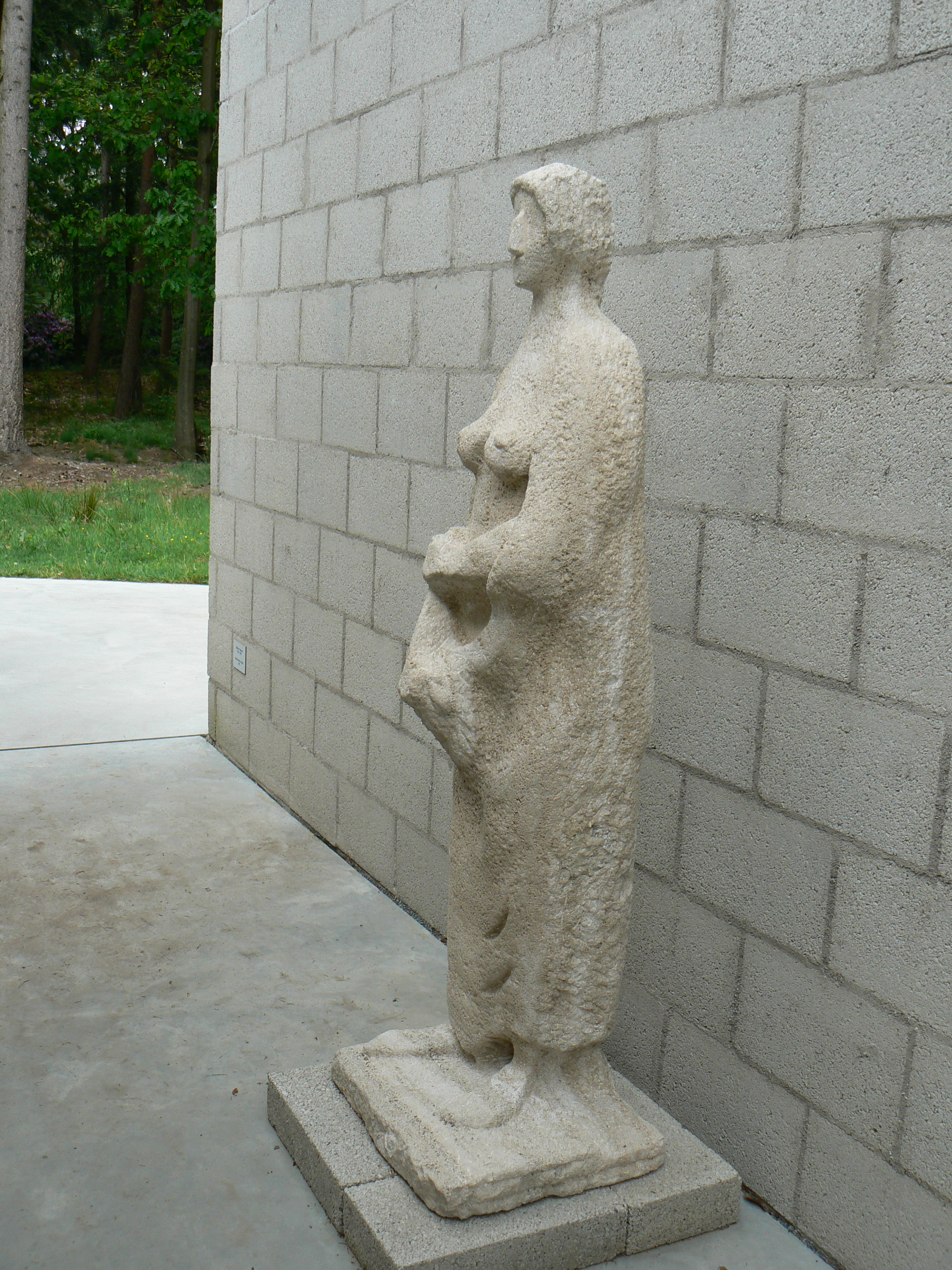
Standing Woman (Stehende Frau), 1947; stone sculpture

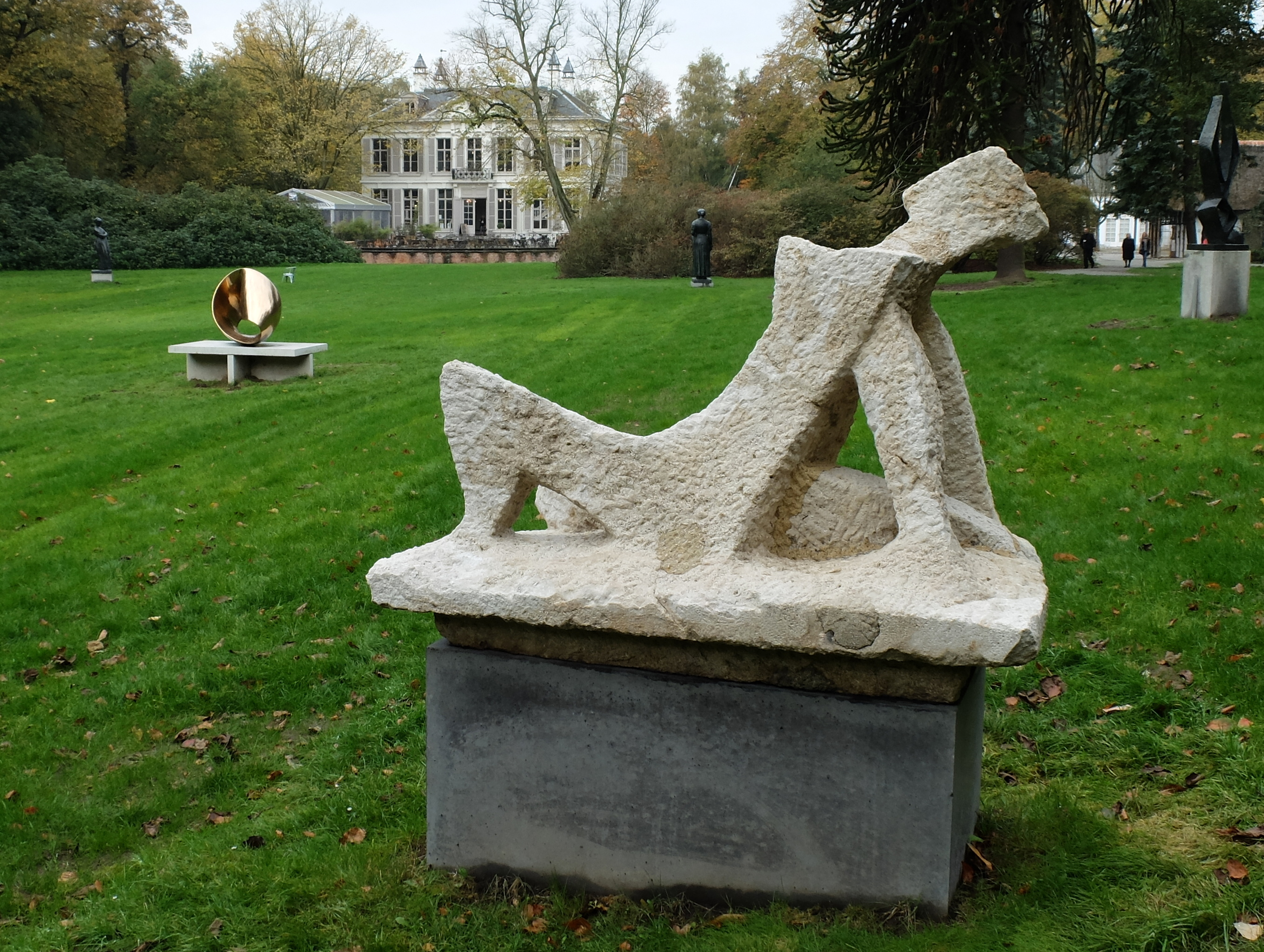
Female Rock (Frauliche Felsen), 1948; stone sculpture

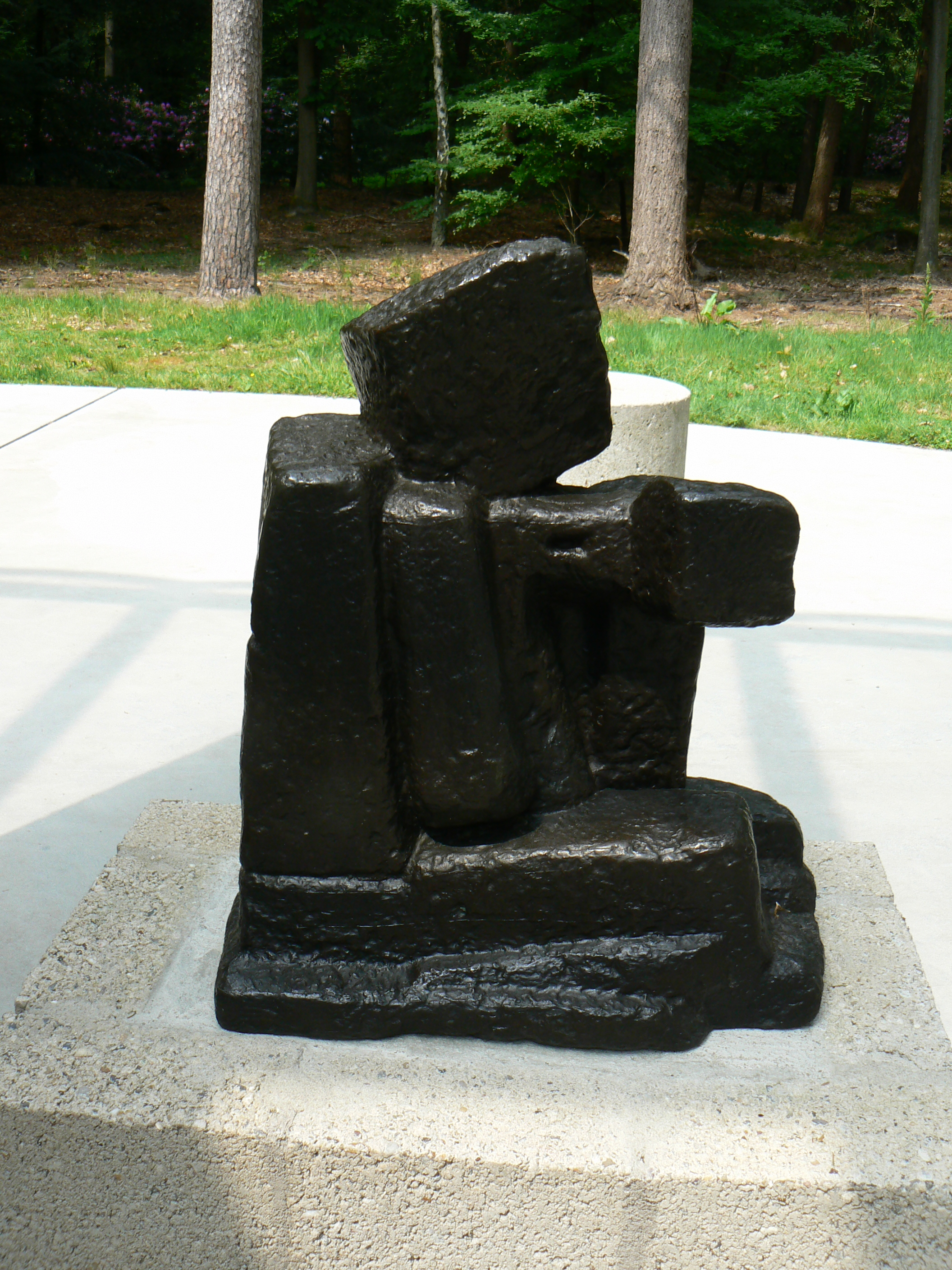
Croucing Figure (Hockende Figur), 1950–51; bronze sculpture

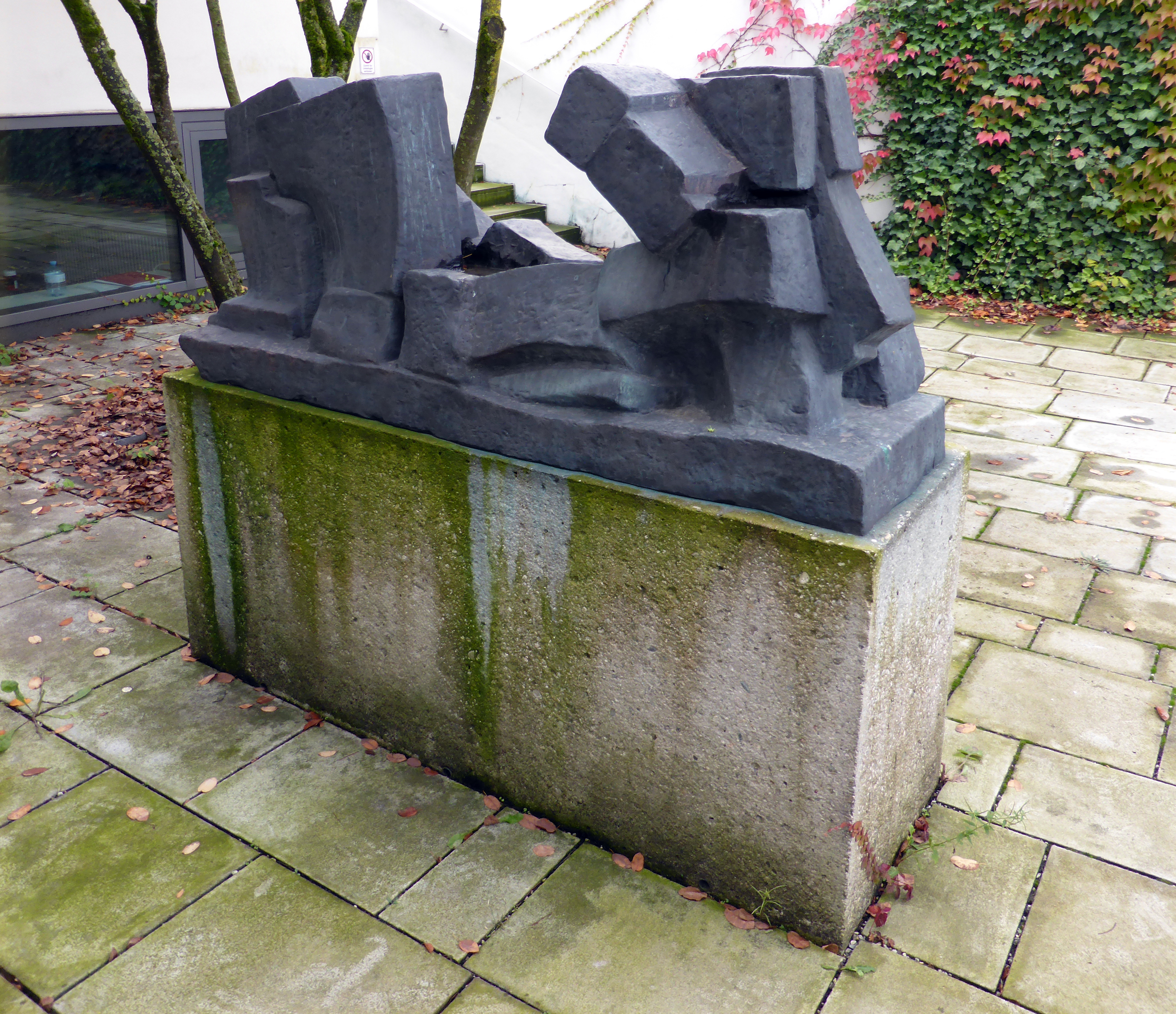
Reclining Figure (Die Liegende), early 1950'; bronze sculpture

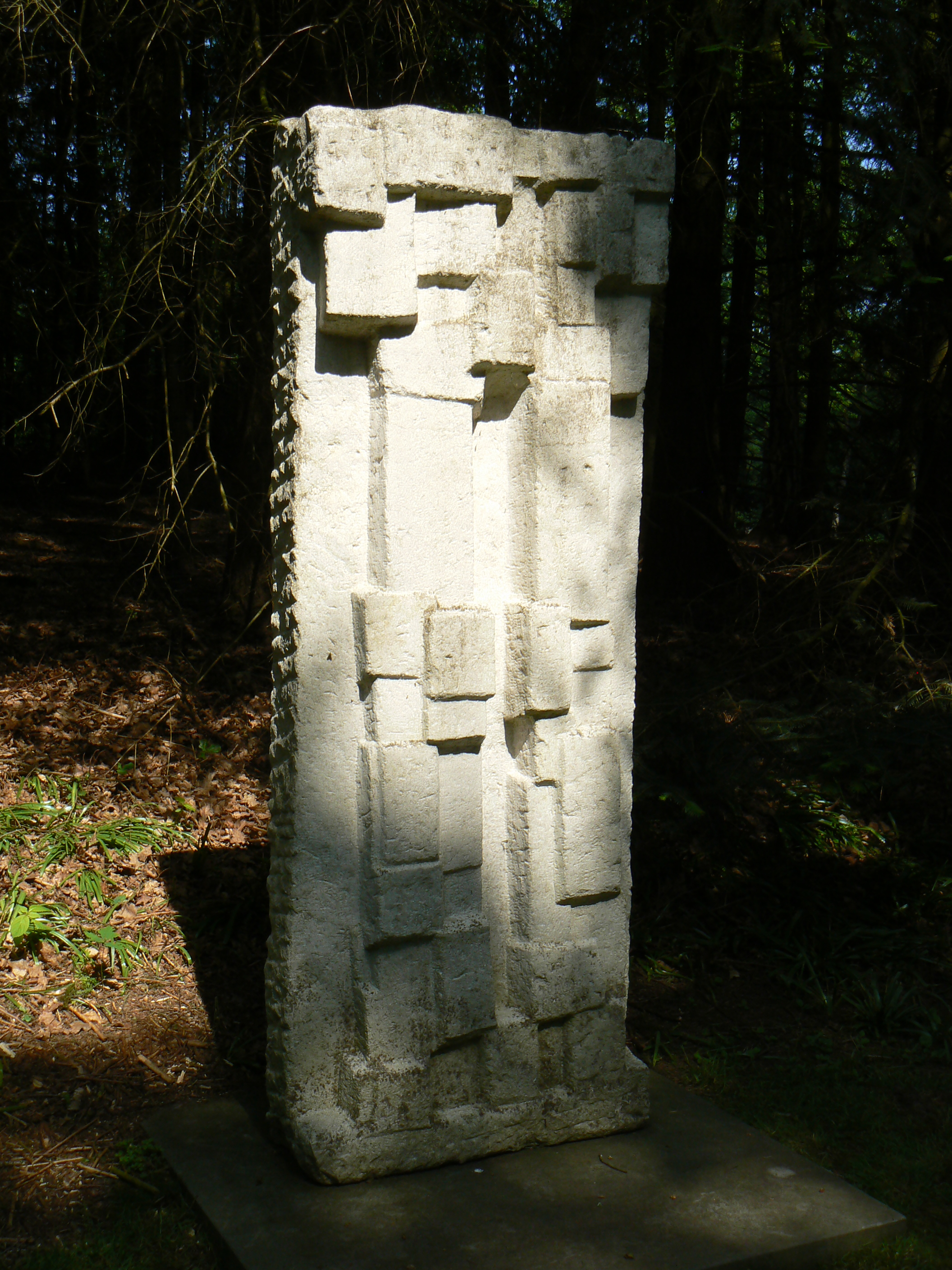
Relief, 1960; stone sculpture

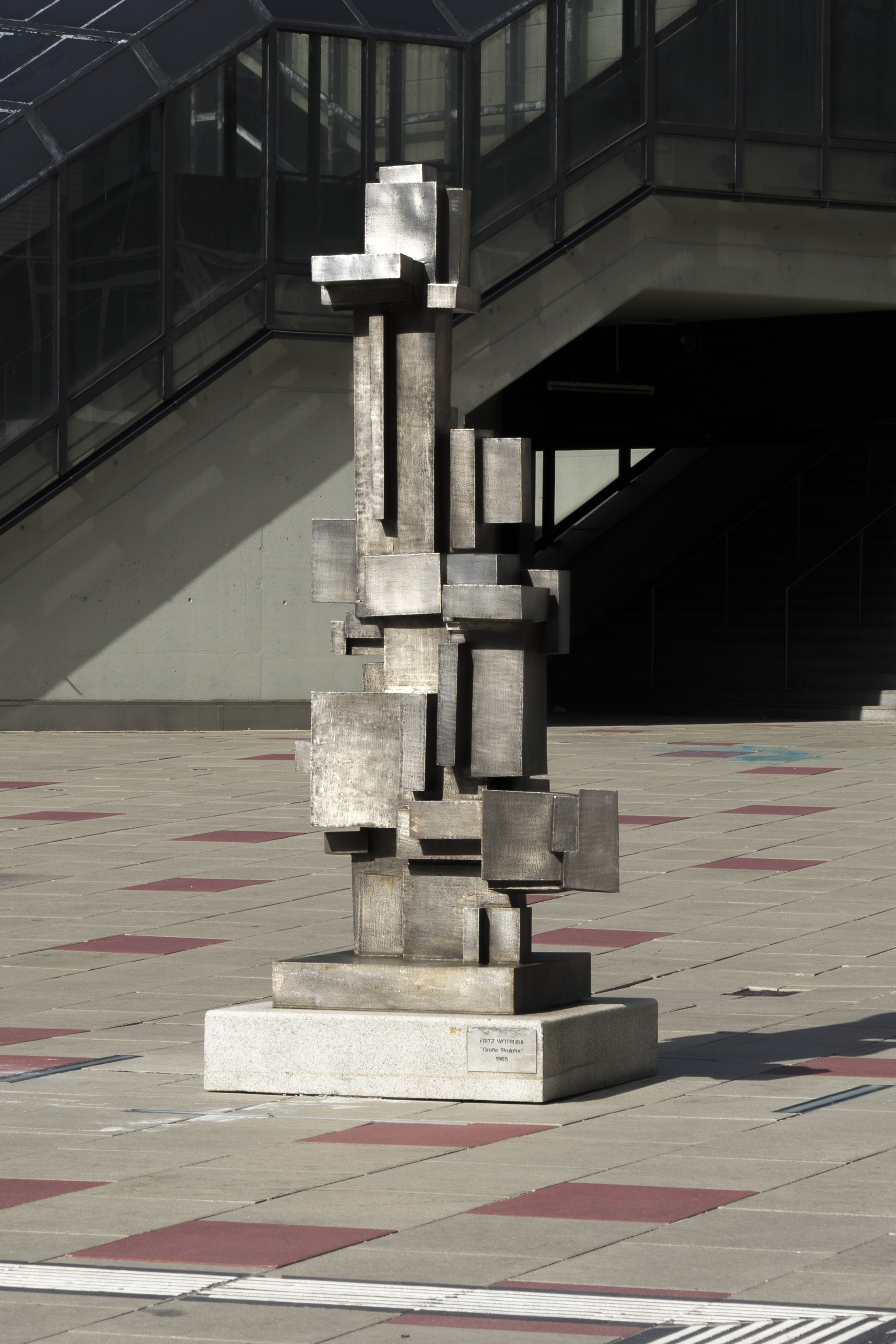
Large Figure (Große Figur), 1965; bronze sculpture

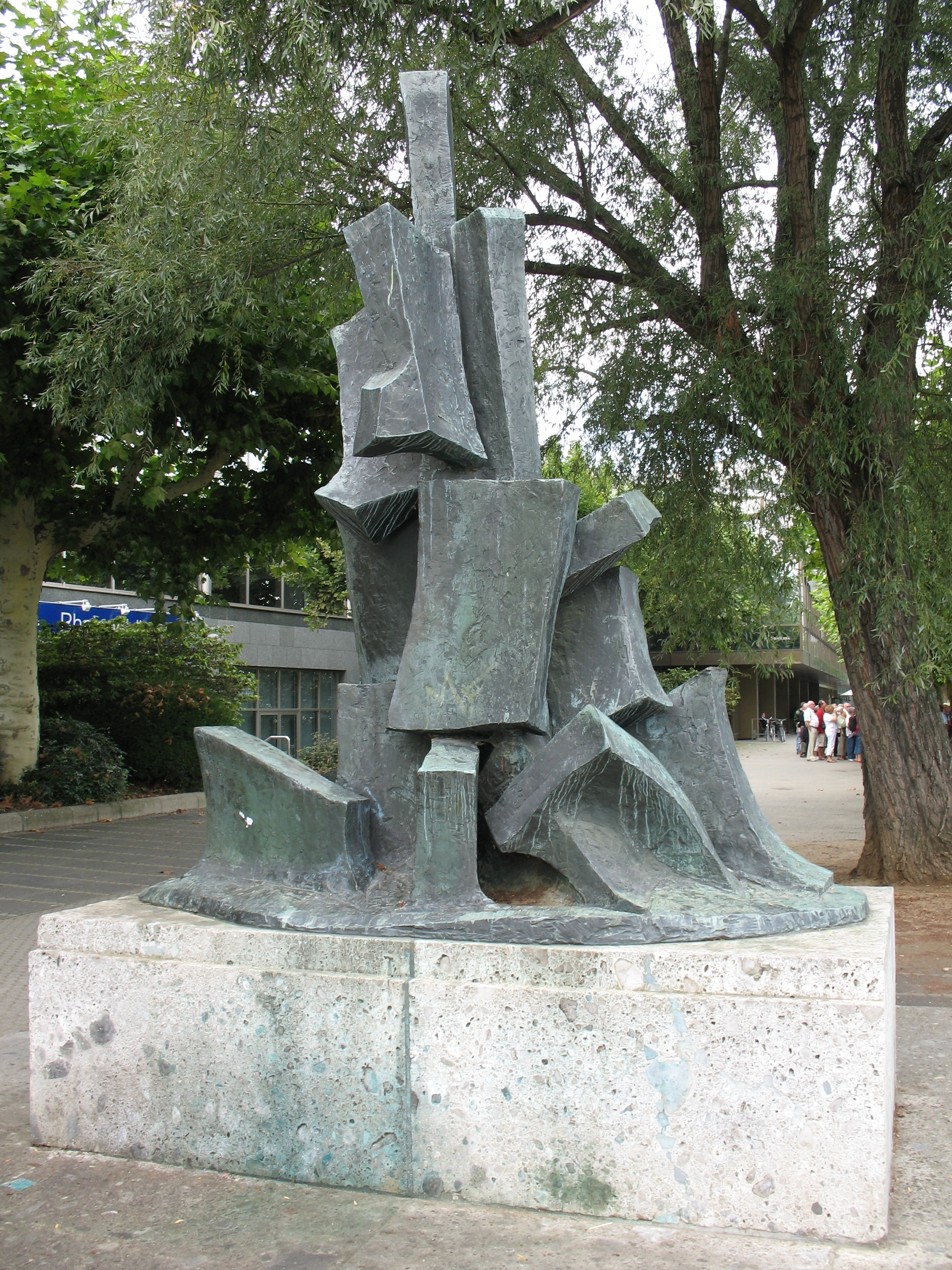
Sculpture honouring Richard Wagner. 1970; bronze

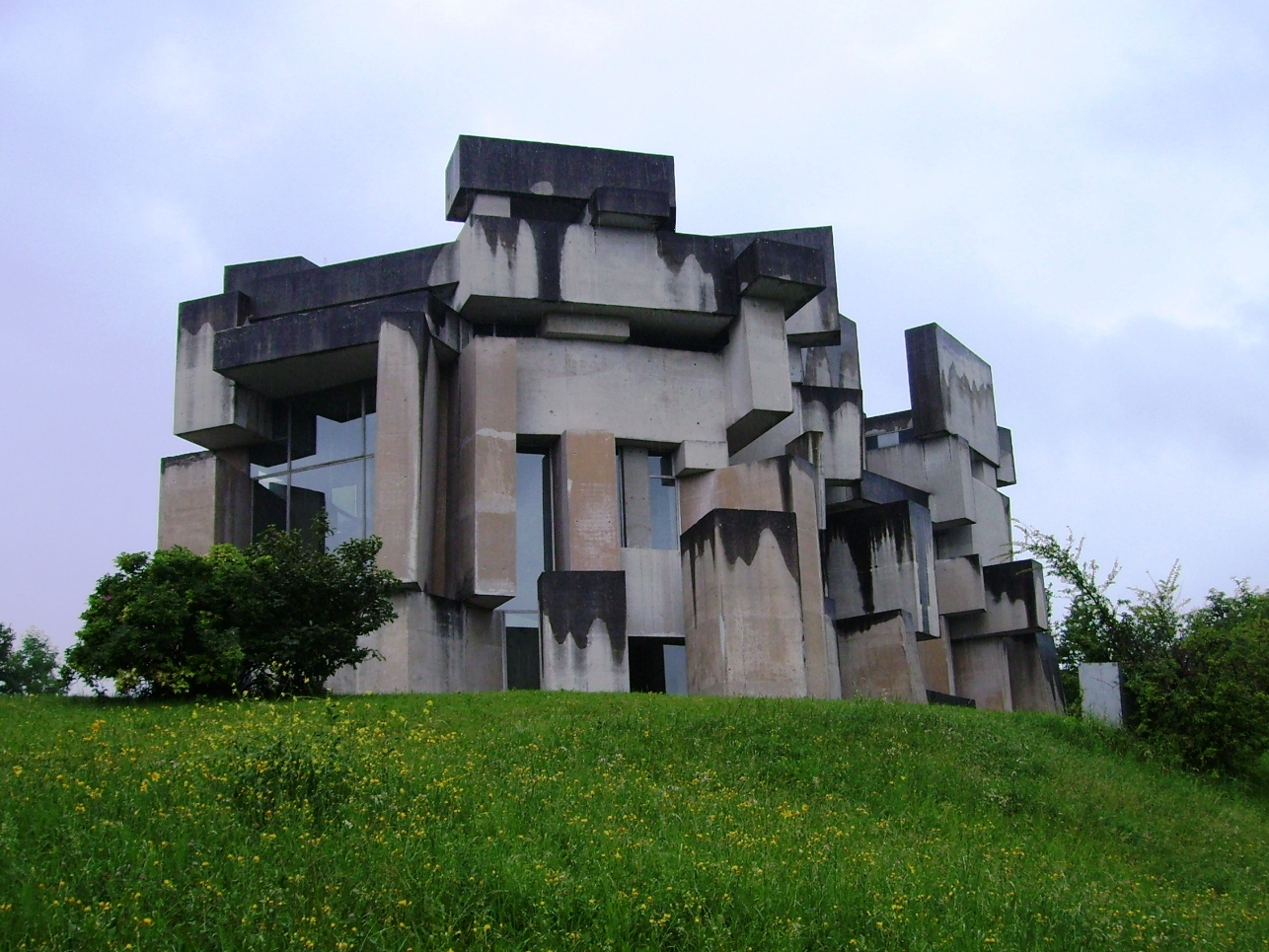
Trinity Church (Dreifaltigkeitskirche), in Vienna-Mauer, built in 1974-76
