= Samy El-Shall =

Egyptian-American physical chemist

- Education: B.S., Chemistry; Ph.D., Physical Chemistry
- Alma mater: Cairo University; Georgetown University
- Occupations: Chemist and academic
- Scientific career
- Workplaces: Virginia Commonwealth University

Samy El-Shall is an Egyptian-American chemist and academic. He is the Mary Eugenia Kapp Chair in Chemistry as well as a professor at Virginia Commonwealth University.

El-Shall's research interests include nanostructured materials, graphene, and nanocatalysis for energy and environmental applications. He is a fellow of the American Physical Society as well as the American Association for the Advancement of Science.

== Education and career ==
El-Shall earned his B.S. degree in chemistry in 1976 from Cairo University. Later in 1985, he completed his Ph.D. in physical chemistry from Georgetown University.

El-Shall is the Mary Eugenia Kapp Chair in Chemistry as well as a professor at Virginia Commonwealth University. Moreover, he also held an appointment as the senior science advisor in the Bureau for the Middle East, Middle East Regional Cooperation (MERC) Program.

== Research ==
El-Shall, along with Wang and others, presented a simple solution synthesis for quantum dots of metal sulfides, featuring chemical reactions between KBH_{4}, sulfur, and metal salts at room temperature in organic solvents. He also developed a new method of synthesizing polymers by utilizing a laser to vaporize metal targets, adding metal particles to the polymer-formation process. His group developed a microwave-based technique to make uniform nanowires and nanorods of certain semiconductors. The process involved changing the heat time to control the shape evolution from nanoparticles to nanorods, and eventually to extended nanowires. His research group also proposed a microwave-assisted method to deposit metal nanoparticles and reduce graphene oxide simultaneously by utilizing reducing agents.

El-Shall, in collaboration with Abdelsayed and others, reported a photothermal reduction method to obtain reduced graphene oxide (rGO) sheets. His work established the effectivity of hybrid catalysts made using microwave-assisted chemical reduction in catalyzing carbon–carbon coupling (Suzuki, Heck) reactions. In addition, he also demonstrated the utility of Pd/FE_{3}O_{4}/G nanocomposites as catalysts for Suzuki and Heck cross-coupling reactions. Furthermore, he co-designed a synergistic bimetallic metal–organic framework containing copper and cobalt ions using benzene tetraamine and benzene tricarboxylic acid.

== Awards and honors ==
- 2012 - Fellow, American Physical Society
- 2013 - Fellow, American Association for the Advancement of Science
- 2018 - Virginia Outstanding Scientist, Government of Virginia

== Selected articles ==
- Wang, W.; Germanenko, I.; El-Shall, M. S. (2002). "Room-temperature synthesis and characterization of nanocrystalline CdS, ZnS, and Cd_{x}Zn_{1–x}S". Chemistry of Materials. 14 (7): 3028–3033. doi:10.1021/cm020040x.
- Panda, A. B.; Glaspell, G.; El-Shall, M. S. (2006). "Microwave synthesis of highly aligned ultra narrow semiconductor rods and wires". Journal of the American Chemical Society. 128 (9): 2790–2791. Bibcode:2006JAChS.128.2790P. doi:10.1021/ja058148b. PMID 16506744.
- Hassan, H. M.; Abdelsayed, V.; Abd El Rahman, S. K.; AbouZeid, K. M.; Terner, J.; El-Shall, M. S.; Al-Resayes, S. I.; El-Azhary, A. A. (2009). "Microwave synthesis of graphene sheets supporting metal nanocrystals in aqueous and organic media". Journal of Materials Chemistry. 19 (23): 3832–3837. doi:10.1039/b906253j.
- Abdelsayed, V.; Moussa, S.; Hassan, H. M.; Aluri, H. S.; Collinson, M. M.; El-Shall, M. S. (2010). "Photothermal deoxygenation of graphite oxide with laser excitation in solution and graphene-aided increase in water temperature". The Journal of Physical Chemistry Letters. 1 (19): 2804–2809. doi:10.1021/jz1011143.
- Siamaki, A. R.; Abd El Rahman, S. K.; Abdelsayed, V.; El-Shall, M. S.; Gupton, B. F. (2011). "Microwave-assisted synthesis of palladium nanoparticles supported on graphene: A highly active and recyclable catalyst for carbon–carbon cross-coupling reactions". Journal of Catalysis. 279 (1): 1–11. doi:10.1016/j.jcat.2010.12.003.
