= Wotruba Church =

Coordinates: 48°08′51.5″N 16°15′12.38″E

- Wotrubakirche
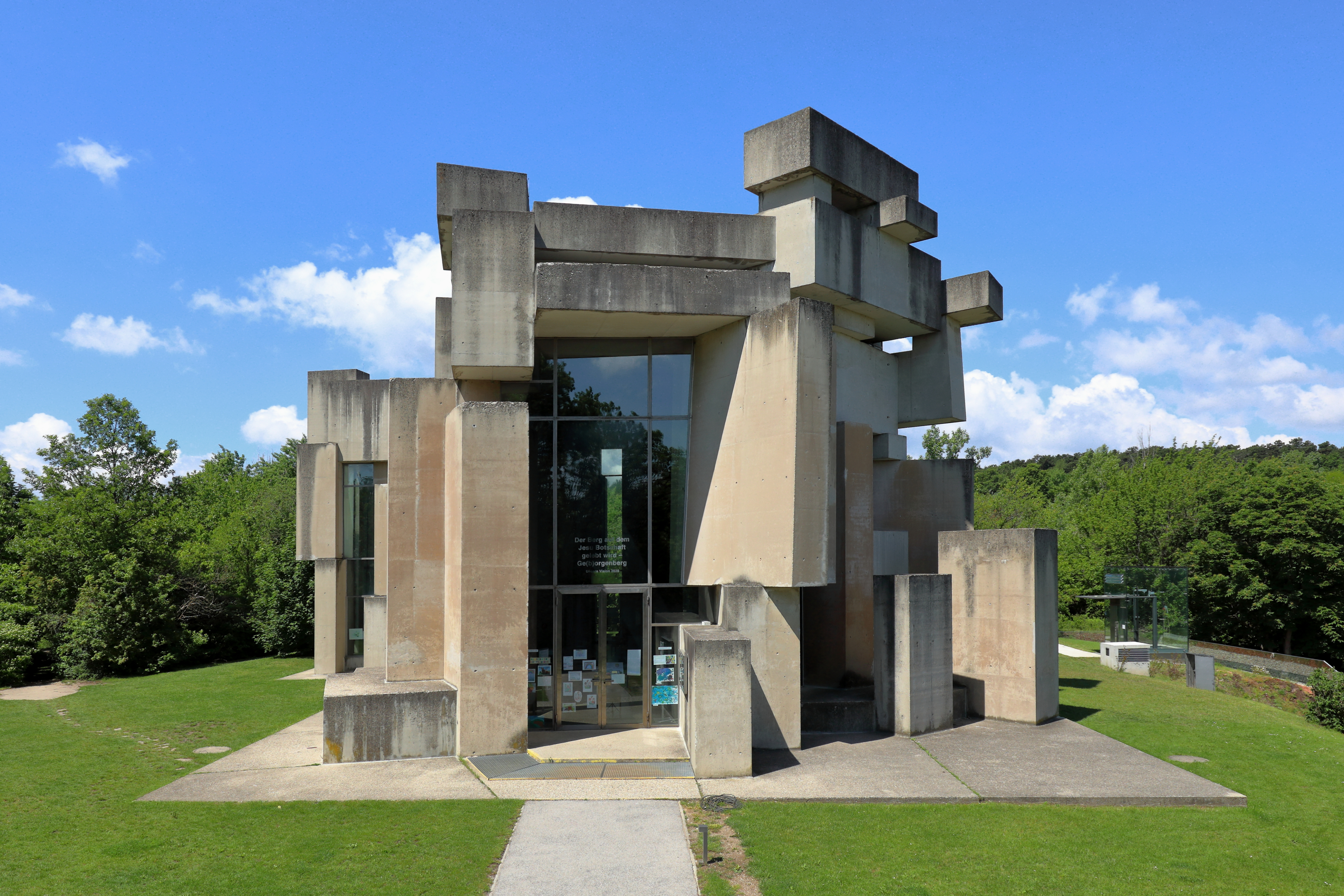
- Wotruba Church
- Location: Mauer District, Liesing, Vienna
- Country: Austria
- Denomination: Catholic Church

Architecture
- Architect(s): Fritz Wotruba, Fritz Gerhard Mayr
- Style: Brutalism
- Groundbreaking: 1974
- Completed: 1976

Administration
- Archdiocese: Vienna

The Kirche Zur Heiligsten Dreifaltigkeit (English: Church of the Most Holy Trinity), better known as the Wotrubakirche or Wotruba Church, is a Catholic church located in Liesing, Vienna. It was built between August 1974 and October 1976, based on a design by Austrian sculptor Fritz Wotruba.

The building of the church was initiated by Margarethe Ottillinger, and designed by Wotruba. The planning architect was Fritz Gerhard Mayr. Ottillinger chose the site of former Nazi barracks, and wanted the new church to make a bold religious and artistic statement during a time of increasing secularization. Wotruba died before the completion of the church, and Mayr oversaw the remaining work.

Wotruba's church was inspired by Chartres Cathedral, and built in a Brutalist style. Built of 152 concrete blocks, it has no visible symmetry, and makes use of clear glass windows to provide light. The altar is made of artificial marble. The bronze crucifix is a copy of one that Wotruba designed for the hofkirche in Bruchsal, Germany.

In 2021/2022 Gabriele Stöger-Spevak curated the first exhibition specifically dedicated to the church forty-five years after its consecration.

Gallery
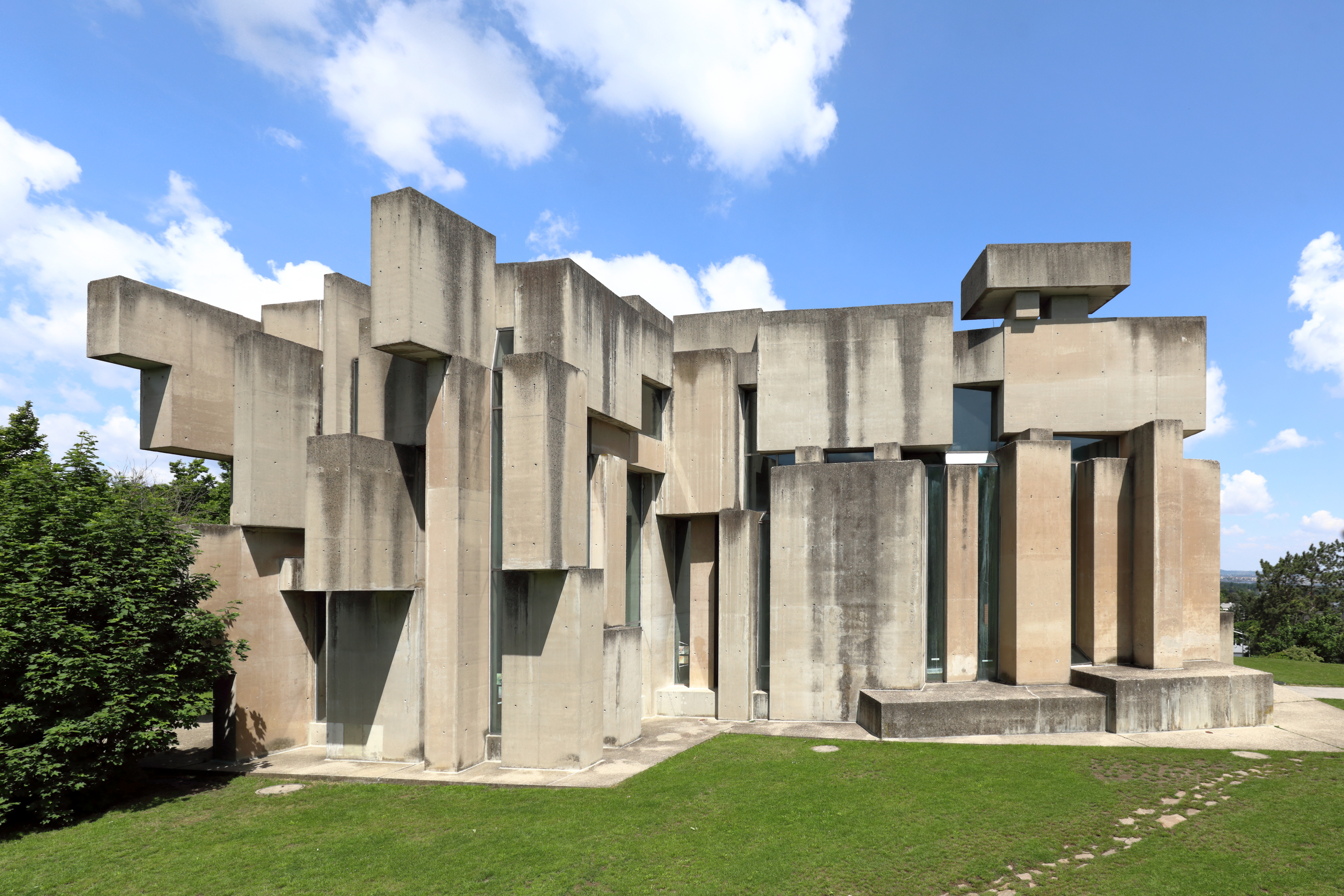
Exterior view from the south

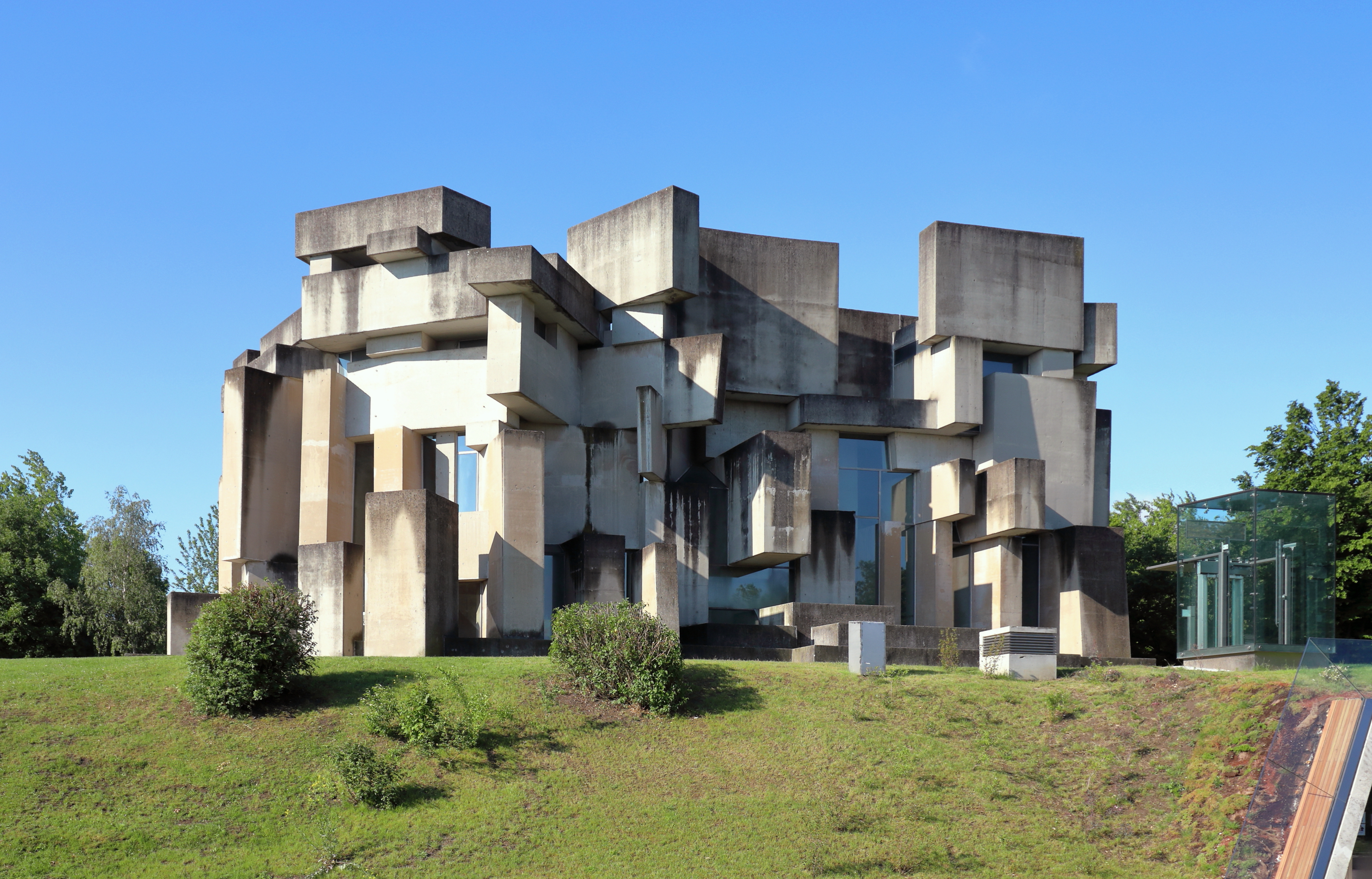
Exterior view from the north

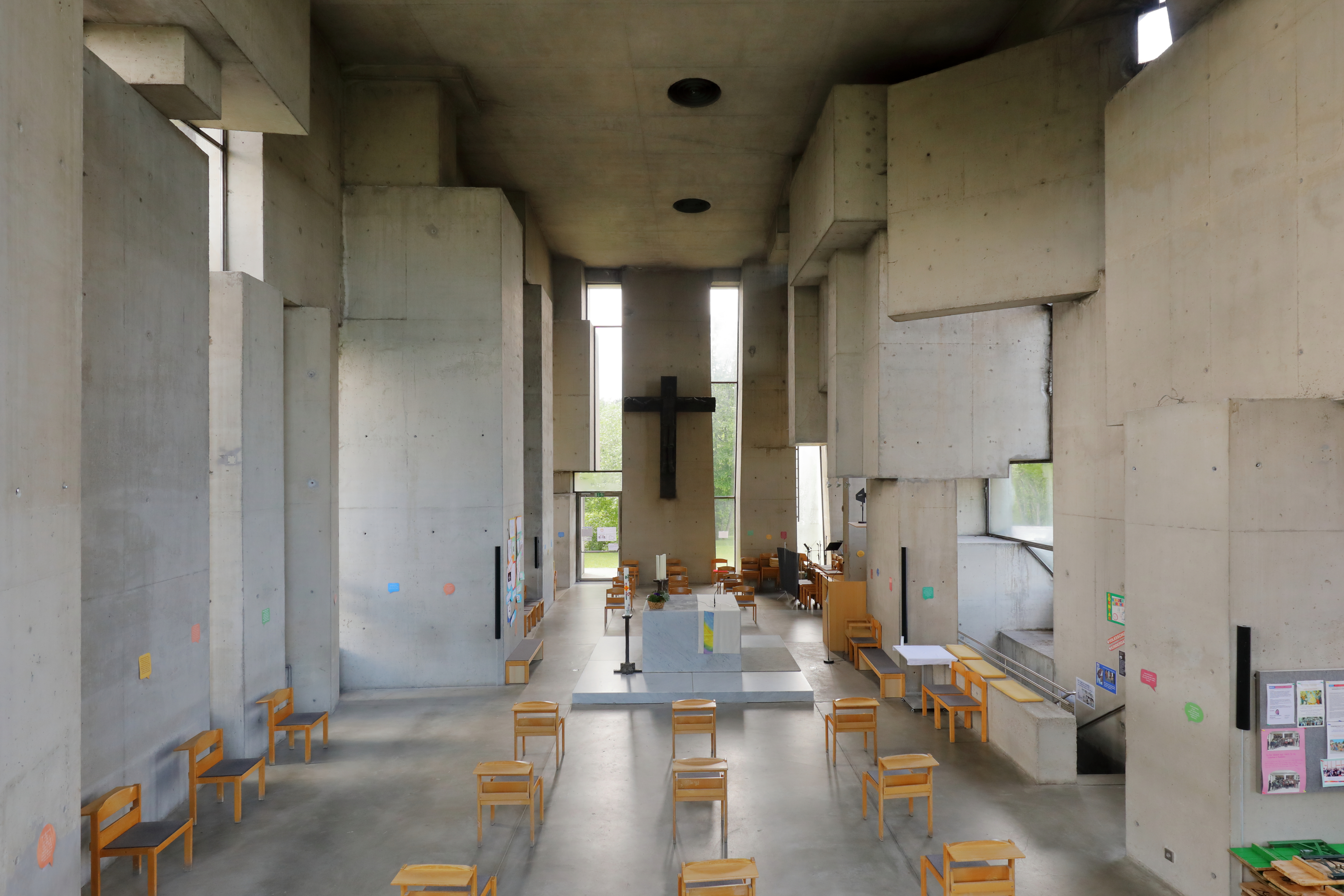
Interior, facing the altar
