= KOP =

Kop or KOP may refer to:

== Places ==
- King of Prussia, Pennsylvania, a suburban town located twenty miles west of Philadelphia, Pennsylvania, US
  - King of Prussia Mall, a shopping mall
- Nakhon Phanom Airport (IATA code), Thailand

== Organisations ==
- Border Protection Corps (Polish: Korpus Ochrony Pogranicza), a Polish military unit
- Kansallis-Osake-Pankki, a former Finnish bank
- Knights of Pythias, a fraternal organization and secret society in Washington, D.C., US
- Ecological and Environmental Movement, a minor political party in Cyprus

== Arts and entertainment ==
- Kop (card game), a Polish card game of the Schafkopf family
- The Knights of Prosperity, a TV series and the fictional title group of protagonists

== Other uses ==
- Chhatrapati Shahu Maharaj Terminus, Kolhapur, India (station code: KOP)
- Koppie, an isolated rock hill, knob, ridge, or small mountain that rises abruptly from a gently sloping or virtually level surrounding plain
- Spion Kop (stadiums), a colloquial name or term for a number of terraces and stands at sports stadiums, particularly in the UK
- Kappa-opioid receptor
- KOP, a Detroit, Michigan, United States radio station, licenced from 1922 until 1925

== See also ==
- Spion Kop (disambiguation)
- Cop (disambiguation)
- Cyprus Football Association (Greek: Κυπριακή Ομοσπονδία Ποδοσφαίρου, ΚΟΠ)
