= Margaret Firth =

English painter (1898–1991)

- Born: 1898; Bradford, West Yorkshire, England
- Died: 1991 (aged 92–93)
- Education: Bradford School of Art
- Parents: Edwin Firth; Sarah Florence
- Relatives: Marmaduke Firth (uncle)

Margaret Firth (1898–1991) was an English painter born in Bradford. She studied at the Bradford School of Art under Fred Stead and Harry Butler.

== Early years ==
Margaret Firth was born in Bradford. Her father, Edwin Firth was a textile manufacturer and part of the business community in late Victorian Bradford. Margaret's mother, Sarah Florence, came from an artistic background and passed on her love of fabric and embroidery to Margaret. The Firths were keen gardeners and Margaret was encouraged to study plants and flowers. Margaret also remembered a childhood visit to see Anna Pavlova perform as an important early experience. In 1906, when Margaret was eight, her mother was diagnosed with Graves' Disease and Margaret assumed the responsibility of caring for her at an early age.

== Education ==
When she was young Margaret was taken care of by a live-in governess. Shortly after her mother was taken ill Margaret was sent to a private day school for girls at Spring Gardens, Off Manningham Lane, Bradford. In 1909 she started at Bradford Grammar School for Girls. Margaret found it hard to adjust to school life. She was a quiet student and painting and drawing did not feature in the school's everyday curriculum. Recognising her artistic talent Margaret's parents encouraged her to apply for a place at Bradford School of Art when she left school in summer 1914. She started at the school the following September, aged 16, to study classes in Light, Shade and Painting. Margaret found it difficult to commit to her studies because of her mother's health and had to leave.

Margaret returned to the School of Art in 1919 after a three-year break and managed to complete a full academic year before she was forced to leave again. She again returned in 1921 for a further 2 terms before another break. Due to her sporadic attendance Margaret was unable to sit and exams and did not gain a Diploma. During her time at Art School Margaret was taught by Fred Stead, who considered her an outstanding pupil. Stead was later replaced by Harry Butler who emphasised the importance of composition.

== Middle years ==
After leaving Art School Margaret was encouraged to continue painting by her father. He built her a large studio at their home 'Bracken Wood'. Margaret continued to work to develop her technique but for the next twenty years she struggled to find time to paint. Unlike her contemporaries from the School of Art John Cooper, John Bickerdike and Richard Eurich, Margaret never considered leaving home for London to establish her career. In the mid-1920s Margaret was commissioned to design interiors for homes which provided a financial income. In the late 1930s Margaret's brother became seriously ill and the health of her mother's health worsened. Margaret's painted ceased altogether. Her brother died in 1940 followed by her mother in 1942. Margaret worked at the Hospital Support Depot in Ilkey to contribute to the war effort. When Edwin Firth died in 1948 Margaret was left alone, aged 50, with no family and few friends. She sold the family home and moved into an attic flat. The flat had a spare room which Margaret turned into a studio to begin to paint again.

== Later years ==
After moving into her new flat Margaret became part of the local art scene which included Theo Moorman, W.T. Oliver, Dorothy Bradford and Maurice de Sausmarez. Margaret became active in the local art scene and in 1950 she was appointed Art Advisor to Ilkley Council and formed a committee to organise art exhibitions in the town. For the next twelve years Margaret sat on the committee which put together an ongoing programme of contemporary art exhibitions shown in the Winter Gardens.

Margaret exhibited her work throughout Yorkshire from the early 1950s onwards. In 1950 Helen Kapp, the director of Wakefield Art Gallery, purchased "Tulips", the first work to enter a museum collection. Kapp later gave Margaret a solo exhibition. Ernest Musgrave, the Director of Leeds Art Gallery, exhibited twenty-five of Margaret's needlework pictures in the show 'Contemporary Painting, Sculpture and Crafts' in 1955. Margaret's work established a considerable reputation in Yorkshire during the 1960s, despite Margaret not wishing to promote herself. The opening of the Hawksworth Gallery in Ilkley led to three further exhibitions of Margaret's work between 1984 and 1987 and a touring retrospective exhibition initiated by Bradford Art Gallery in 1988.
