= Alexander Kapp =

Alexander Kapp may refer to

- Alexander Kapp (dermatologist and allergist) (born 1955) medical director of the department of dermatology and allergy at the Medical University of Hannover
- Alexander Kapp (German educator and editor), (1799–1869) inventor of the term andragogy
