= Yvonne Kapp =

British writer and political activist (1903–1999)

Kapp from the cover of Time Will Tell

Yvonne Helene Kapp (née Mayer; 17 April 1903 – 22 June 1999) was a British writer and political activist. Kapp also wrote under the name Yvonne Cloud.

== Biography ==
Yvonne Hélène Mayer was born on 17 April 1903 at 170 Tulse Hill, London, into a Jewish immigrant family, daughter of prosperous vanilla merchant Max Alfred Mayer (1871–1948) and his wife Clarisse Fanny Bielefeld (1878–1960).

She started work with a brief stint on the Evening Standard and moved on to the Sunday Times. She joined the Communist Party of Great Britain and visited the USSR. She worked on behalf of Jewish and Basque refugees. She was married to Edmund Kapp from 1922 to 1930.

In 1932, Kapp wrote a novel, Nobody Asked You, under the pseudonym Yvonne Cloud. The novel was initially rejected by publishers because it dealt with the theme of lesbianism. Kapp then self-published the novel, which was a commercial success.

In 1938 she was co-author, with Margaret Mynatt, of British Policy and the Refugees, not published until 1968.

From 1941 to 1947 worked for the Amalgamated Engineering Union as a research officer. Subsequently, she worked for the Medical Research Council, and later as a translator, and writing her magnum opus, a life of Eleanor Marx.

She died on 22 June 1999.

== Bibliography ==
- Nobody Asked You (as Yvonne Cloud), 1932
- British Policy and the Refugees, 1968 (with Margaret Mynatt).
- Eleanor Marx, 2 vols, Lawrence & Wishart, 1972–6.
- Time Will Tell, Verso, 2003 (posthumous).

Kapp also co-translated a volume of Bertold Brecht's short stories.

- 1983. Short Stories: 1921–1946. Ed. John Willett and Ralph Manheim. Trans. Yvonne Kapp, Hugh Rorrison and Antony Tatlow. London and New York: Methuen. ISBN 0-413-52890-1.
