= Polia Chentoff =

Russian artist (1896–1933)

- Born: 1896; Vitebsk, Russian Empire
- Died: 1933 (aged 36–37); London, England
- Education: Royal Academy of Fine Arts, Brussels
- Known for: Painting, sculpture
- Spouse: Edmond Xavier Kapp

Polia Chentoff or Polina Chentova (1896–1933) was a Russian artist, known for her paintings, sculptures and book illustrations, who spent a large part of her career in Paris and London.

== Biography ==
Polia Chentoff was born in 1896 in Vitebsk in the Russian Empire in the family of Jewish shopkeeper Abram Chentoff, and, after first moving to Moscow, studied art at the Royal Academy of Fine Arts in Brussels. She subsequently moved to Paris where she exhibited works at the Paris Salon and illustrated a number of children's books for a Berlin publisher. After returning to Moscow for some years, Chentoff moved to London in the late 1920s where she continued to exhibit her paintings and sculptures. She had solo exhibitions at several commercial galleries, including the Paul Guillaume and Brandon Davis galleries, she also showed woodcuts and engravings at the Bloomsbury Gallery during June 1930. In 1932 Chentoff married the artist Edmond Xavier Kapp but died, in London, the following year from a cerebral tumour.

The artist El Lissitzky fell in love with Chentoff in the early 1920s, pursued her to Berlin, and apparently even tried to commit suicide in connection with the unrequited love.

Engravings by Chentoff for The Voice of Fire by Manuel Komroff, 1928

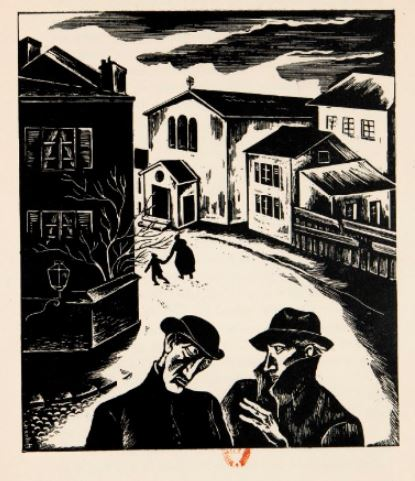

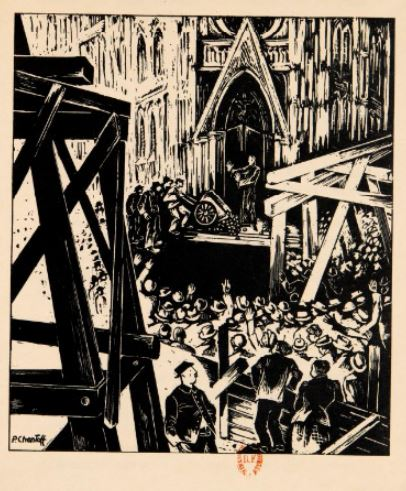

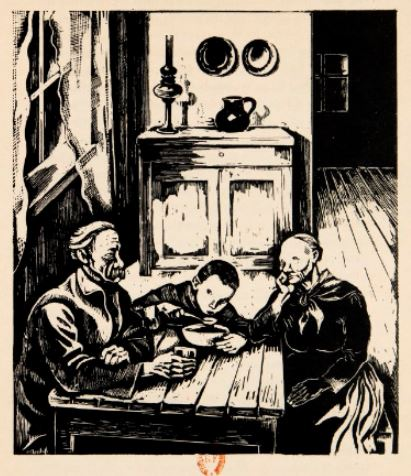
