= Martha Copp =

American sociologist

Martha Copp is an American sociologist. She is a professor in the Department of Sociology and Anthropology at East Tennessee State University (ETSU). She is known for her work on symbolic interactionism, emotion management theory, and on teaching fieldwork to students. She co-authored Emotions and Fieldwork (1993) with Sherryl Kleinman.

== Selected publications ==
- Kleinman, Sherryl; Martha Copp (1993). Emotions and Fieldwork. Sage Publiscations. ISBN 978-0-8039-4721-4.
- Kleinman, Sherryl; Copp, Martha A.; Henderson, Karla A. (1997). "Qualitatively Different. Teaching Fieldwork to Graduate Students". Journal of Contemporary Ethnography. 25 (4): 469–499. doi:10.1177/089124197025004003.
- Copp, Martha (1998). "When Emotion Work is Doomed to Fail: Ideological and Structural Constraints on Emotion Management". Symbolic Interaction. 21 (3): 299–328. doi:10.1525/si.1998.21.3.299.
- Copp, Martha (2004). "Negotiated Order". In George Ritzer (ed.). Encyclopedia of Social Theory. Sage Publications. pp. 525–529. ISBN 978-1-4522-6546-9.
- Fields, Jessica; Martha Copp; Sherryl Kleinman (2007). "Symbolic interactionism, inequality, and emotions". In Jan E. Stets; Jonathan H. Turner (eds.). Handbook of the Sociology of Emotions. Springer. pp. 155–178. ISBN 978-0-387-73991-5.
- Copp, Martha (2008). "Emotions in qualitative research". In Lisa M. Given (ed.). SAGE Encyclopedia of Qualitative Research Methods. Vol. 1. pp. 249–252. ISBN 978-1-4129-4163-1.
