= Helen Kapp =

British artist

Helen Babette Kapp
- Born: 17 December 1901; Hampstead, London, England
- Died: 13 October 1978 (aged 76); Leiston, Suffolk, England
- Education: Slade School of Fine Art; Central School of Art and Design
- Known for: Painter, illustrator, curator.

Helen Babette Kapp (17 December 1901 – 13 October 1978) was a British artist. Originally a painter and illustrator, Kapp became a curator and gallery director of some influence.

== Biography ==
Kapp was born in Hampstead in London into an artistic, émigré family, with a German father and an American mother, while her elder brother was the artist Edmond Xavier Kapp. She studied at the Slade School of Fine Art and then the Central School of Art and Design in London before completing her studies in Paris.

Working as a painter in both oils and watercolours and as an illustrator and wood engraver, Kapp exhibited at the Royal Academy in London, with the London Group, the Artists' International Association and both the Society of Wood Engravers and the Society of Women Artists. Her first solo exhibition was at Nicholson's Gallery in London in 1946 and she also took part in a British Council exhibition in Haifa in Israel. Kapp provided illustrations for several books for a variety of publishers and also wrote the 1975 volume Enjoying Pictures.

In 1951 Kapp was appointed the director of the Wakefield Art Gallery, now the Hepworth Wakefield, and held that post until 1961 when she became the first director of the Abbot Hall Art Gallery in Kendal. In running the Wakefield and building the Abbot Hall collection, Kapp became among the first curators to recognise and acquire works by contemporary artists such as Joan Eardley, Anne Redpath, Sheila Fell and Alan Davie among others. She retired in 1967 to live in Leiston in Suffolk. Kapp curated the exhibition Yorkshire Art 1900–1973 in Harrogate in 1973.

== Books illustrated ==
- Seed of Israel: Tales from the English Bible, 1927, edited by Gerald Bullett, published by Howe,
- The Scandel and Credulities of John Aubrey, 1931, by John Collier, published by Peter Davies,
- Take Forty Eggs, 1938, by Basil Collier & Helen Kapp, published by Gollancz,
- Rose Recipes, 1939, by Eleanour Sinclair Rohde, published by Routledge,
- Fables and Satires, 1945, by Harold Morland, published by Routledge,
- Toying with a Fancy, 1948, by James Laver, published by Hale.
