= Luisa Cappiani =

Austrian opera singer

Luisa Kapp-Young
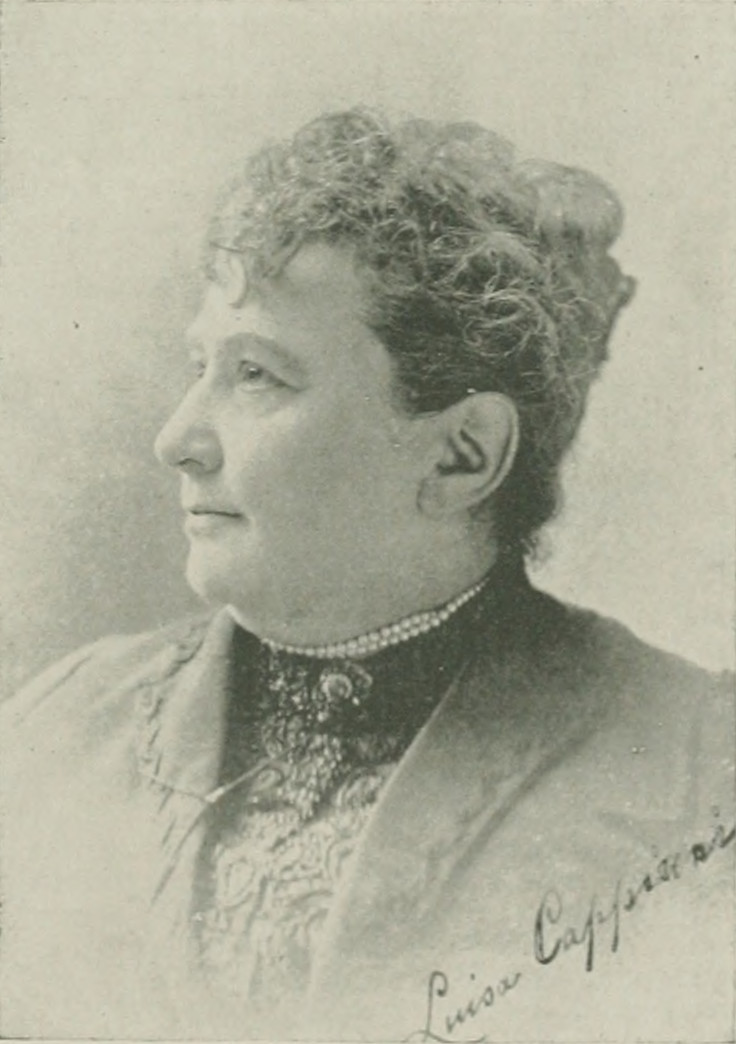
- Photo and signature in A Woman of the Century
- Born: Luisa Young; 24 April 1829; Linz, Austria
- Died: September 27, 1919 (aged 90); Zürich, Switzerland
- Education: Vienna Conservatory
- Occupations: dramatic operatic soprano, musical educator, essayist
- Spouse: Gisbert Kapp
- Children: Gisbert Kapp
- Writing career
- Pen name: Luisa Cappiani
- Genre: opera
- Notable works: Practical Hints and Helps for Perfection in Singing

Luisa Kapp-Young (née, Young; pseudonym, Luisa Cappiani; 24 April 1829 – 27 September 1919), was an Austrian dramatic operatic soprano, musical educator, and essayist who used the principle of the Aeolian harp emission of tone, which excluded all effort in the throat, and preserved the voice. Kapp-Young made her debut after the death of her husband, Gisbert Kapp, in 1859. In 1861, she sang Wagner roles in Rotterdam. In the United States, she appeared in 1867 as Mme. Kapp-Young. After several seasons in Italy, she came back to the United States, and established herself under the name of Cappiani as a teacher in Boston and New York City. In 1884, she was one of the original founders of the American Federation of Musicians, and the only woman initially elected. After 1899, she lived permanently in Milan, and died in Zürich in 1919. Her essays on the voice were reproduced in many musical papers in the U.S. and other countries. She died in 1919.

== Early life and education ==
Luisa Young was born 24 April 1829, in Linz. (Note: Willard & Livermore (1893, p. 149) give her place of birth as Trieste.) Her paternal grandfather was a noted Scotchman who was a professor in the Ludwig-Maximilians-Universität München (LMU). Her father was a dramatic tenor, at the Hof-Capelle, Munich, and her mother was a German woman of high social rank. Her brother, Frederic Young, was also a dramatic tenor.

At the age of six years, Kapp-Young was a musical prodigy, and she received a thorough musical education. Her childhood was one of song, but song carefully directed by wise parents. Her musical education was continued at the Vienna Conservatory. In Vienna, her teachers were Josephine Fröhlich and the tenor Passadonna; in Italy, they were San Giovanni, Vanucini, Gamberini, the elder Romani and Francesco Lamperti.

== Career ==
=== Singer ===
In 1850, at the age of twenty-one, she married Gisbert Kapp, an Austrian counselor. Her husband died three years after their marriage, leaving her with two children, a son, also named Gisbert Kapp, and a daughter, and with only a small pension with which to support and educate her family. After a period of mourning, Kapp-Young began to make use of her talents and her training, in order to enough money for her children's education. When she began her musical career, in 1859, she combined her names, Kapp and Young, into Kapp-Young.

Kapp-Young's aristocratic friends persuaded her to give two public concerts, which were so successful that Anton Rubinstein and Piatti engaged her for their concerts in Vienna, where she lived with her mother. She was then called to court concerts in Vienna, Prague, and Saxe-Coburg and Gotha. In Munich, her concerts brought an invitation to sing in opera. On 13 May 1860, Kapp-Young made her operatic debut, singing with her brother, Frederic, in La Juive, and under his guidance, while he sang Eleasar, her Rachelle was, a success. After that, she appeared in London under the auspices and at the residence of Viscountess Palmerston, her crowning triumph being in a concert given by Queen Victoria in the Golden Room of Buckingham Palace to the King of Belgium. Her teachers in dramatic action were her brother, Frederic, and his wife, and Lucile Grahn. After appearing in the Royal Theater, Hanover, she was called to Frankfurt am Main, and then to the Grand Duchy of Hesse-Cassel. At the request of the Intendant, she made her debut there as Lucrezia. Her Valentine in Les Huguenots, Fidès in Le prophète, and Leonore in Fidelio made an impression. Hermann Levi, then leader of the Grand Opera in Rotterdam, engaged her after her rendering of Elizabeth in Tannhäuser. Her appearance in Rotterdam as Ortrud in Lohengrin created a furore. After that, she appeared in Pesth, Prague, and Vienna.

The sudden death of Kapp-Young's mother caused a severe illness. A sojourn at Como restored her health so that she could sing in a festival in Bergamo. After that, she sang in Italian her great role of Valentine in La Scala, in Milan, and then filled engagements for Italian opera in Bucharest and in the Imperial Theater, Nice. The carnival of Parma followed, and there she created the role of Selika in L'Africaine, singing it thirty-two times in one carnival. Yianesi, the leader of the Liceu in Barcelona, engaged her after that event. The Imperial Theater of Tiflis, Russia, was her next triumph. However, at the end of the season, she contracted bronchitis. Permitted by a foolish physician and over-persuaded by the Intendant and the Prince, she sang despite her illness. An enthusiastic torchlight procession in her honor closed the evening, but she was unable to acknowledge the ovation, as that night, she was at the point of death by suffocation, in consequence of the ill-advised vocal exertion. In September, 1868, the city of Arezzo bestowed upon her, for her singing in a festival, the gold medal of merit by King Victor Emmanuel II's decree.

=== Teacher ===
A few months after the Arezzo festival, imagining herself to be well, Kapp-Young accepted an engagement from Max Maretzek for the Academy of Music in New York City. The stormy travel to the U.S. brought on a relapse; still, she appeared with remarkable success in L'Africaine at the Academy in 1868–69. At that time, she discovered in her vocal art some fortunate secrets which enabled her to overcome the difficulties brought on her by bronchitis, and the knowledge of which, thereafter, made her famous as a teacher. After one season in the U.S., she retired from the stage and went to Milan, and there, soon and often, was called upon to advise young singers.

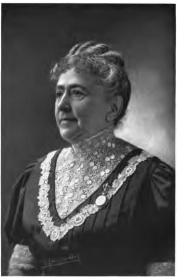
Luisa Cappiani (1908)

For several years, Kapp-Young taught in Europe, but at the request of American pupils, who came in numbers to study with her, she removed to the U.S., settling in Boston. It was here, when singing in a Harvard University concert, and acting under the advice of Dr. Eben Tourjée, that she changed her name from Kapp-Young to Cappiani. During her teaching, she found time to appear occasionally in concerts. While her voice could not endure the fatigue of a whole opera, it retained its sweetness and power for short selections.

== Later life ==
Kapp-Young was actively connected with the Music Teachers National Association (founded in 1876) from the first, as well as with the New York State organization. When the board of examiners of the American Federation of Musicians was organized in Cleveland, Ohio, in 1884, she was the only woman elected among eighteen professors. At a subsequent meeting in New York, she was re-elected. Her essays on the voice were reproduced in many musical papers in the U.S. and foreign countries, notably in Germany. She left Boston to settle in New York in 1894. After a rest at her daughter’s home in Italy, she returned to the U.S. and resumed teaching in 1895. After 1899, Kapp-Young lived permanently in Milan. She died at Zürich, September 27, 1919.
