= Owen Copp =

American physician (1858–1933)

Owen Copp, M.D. (1858–1933) was an American physician and a psychiatric administrator. He was president of the American Psychiatric Association from 1921 to 1922, and proposed a progressive program in mental health in the United States.

== Biography ==
Copp was born in Salem, New Hampshire, in 1858. He graduated from Dartmouth College in 1881, and then from Harvard Medical School in 1884. In 1885, he was appointed assistant physician at Taunton State Hospital (formerly known as the State Lunatic Hospital at Taunton) in Massachusetts and later served as assistant superintendent for the hospital. In 1898, the Massachusetts Hospital for Epileptics was opened (later renamed the Monson State Hospital) in Palmer, Massachusetts, and Copp was appointed to direct the construction and remodeling of the hospital. The following year he was appointed executive officer of the new Massachusetts State Board of Insanity. In 1900, he proposed to the state legislators a program to take care of three kinds of patients: the acute and curable, the chronic, and those who would live in a colony-type setting. The Gardner State Colony for the Insane was opened in 1902 in Gardner, Massachusetts, and it pioneered the use of cottage residences for mental ill patients.

In 1908, Copp proposed the need for a psychopathic hospital for scientific research, medical education, and outpatient services, and he advocated for the construction of a metropolitan-styled mental hospital for approximately 2,000 patients. In 1909, laboratory services in the state hospitals were increased and a state pathologist was appointed.

In 1911, Copp left Massachusetts to become physician-in-chief and superintendent of the Department of Mental Diseases of the Pennsylvania Hospital in Philadelphia. He built and remodeled old buildings and hired new medical staff. From 1922 to 1929, he was relieved of his administrative responsibilities and became a full-time consultant on the building of a new institute. Copp was active in the revision of Pennsylvania mental health laws by advocating state involvement in mental hygiene and community mental health services. After his retirement in 1921, he remained a consultant for development at the Pennsylvania hospital.

In his Presidential address to the American Psychiatric Association in 1921, Copp pointed out the needs for psychiatric and mental hygiene programs which would be appropriate into the twenty-first century. Many of his proposals have since been adopted by state legislatures.

He died in Seville, Spain, in 1933.

== Works ==
- Copp, Owen. “Sulphonal as Hypnotic,” American Journal of Insanity (1889-1890): 499-503.
- Copp, Owen. “Characteristics of the Scotch Lunacy System,” American Journal of Psychiatry 61 (1904): 55-69.
- Copp, Owen. “Mental Disease and Mental Defect: Their Magnitude and Import,” Transactions of the College of Physicians (1916): 139-147.
- Copp, Owen. “An Administrative Ideal in Public Welfare Work,” American Journal of Insanity (1919-1920): 1-14.
- Copp, Owen. “The Duty of the State and the Physician to the Mental Patient,” The Pennsylvania Medical Journal (1919-1920): 152-155.
- Copp, Owen. “Presidential Address: Some Problems Confronting the Association,” American Journal of Psychiatry 78 (1921): 1-13.
- Copp, Owen. “The Private Corporate Endowed Mental Hospital: Its Past and Future,” Proceedings of the Connecticut State Medical Society (1924): 99-109.
