= David Copp =

Canadian philosopher

Education
- Education: Cornell University (MA, PhD), York University (BA)

Philosophical work
- Era: 21st-century philosophy
- Region: Western philosophy
- Institutions: University of California, Davis (2009-), Simon Fraser University, University of Illinois at Chicago, Bowling Green State University (BGSU), University of Florida
- Main interests: moral philosophy, political philosophy

David Copp is a Canadian philosopher and Distinguished Professor Emeritus of Philosophy at the University of California, Davis in Davis, California, United States. He is known for his work on moral and political philosophy.

== Books ==
- Morality, Normativity, and Society (Oxford University Press, 1995)
- Morality in a Natural World (Cambridge University Press, 2007)
