= J. Homer Copp =

American politician

Member of the Virginia House of Delegates from Shenandoah County
- In office 1920–1921
- Preceded by: Otto V. Pence
- Succeeded by: C. H. Hoover

Personal details
- Born: John Homer Copp; January 14, 1882 Shenandoah County, Virginia, U.S.
- Died: May 6, 1944 (aged 62) Strasburg, Virginia
- Resting place: Maurertown Brethren Church Cemetery, Maurertown, Shenandoah County
- Party: Republican

John Homer Copp (January 14, 1882 – May 6, 1944) was an American politician who served in the Virginia House of Delegates.

== Early life ==
Copp's mother was Ella K. Copp.

== Career ==
In 1919, he was the Republican candidate for Shenandoah County in the Virginia House of Delegates, against Democratic candidate George H. Snarr. He won with 1,872 votes compared to Snarr's 1,243.

== Personal life ==
Copp and his wife, Edna, had two daughters (Mary and Frances) and a son (John A. Copp).

Copp was injured fatally on May 6, 1944, while driving on Route 631 near Strasburg, where he lived. His car was hit by a Baltimore and Ohio Railroad train. He died before he could be taken to a Winchester hospital. He was 62.
