= Alonzaville, Virginia =

- Census-designated place
- Location within the Commonwealth of Virginia Alonzaville (the United States)
- Coordinates: 38°55′43″N 78°32′47″W
- Country: United States
- State: Virginia
- County: Shenandoah
- Time zone: UTC−5 (Eastern (EST))
  - Summer (DST): UTC−4 (EDT)
- GNIS feature ID: 2830681

Alonzaville is an unincorporated community and census-designated place in Shenandoah County, Virginia, United States. Alonzaville lies at the crossroads of Virginia Secondary Routes 623 and 604. According to the Geographic Names Information System, Alonzaville has also been known as Alonzoville and Alorzaville.

== Demographics ==
Historical population
Census	Pop.	Note	%±

The United States Census Bureau defined Alonzaville as a census-designated place (CDP) in 2023.
