= Gisbert Kapp =

Austrian-English electrical engineer (1852–1922)

- Born: 2 September 1851; Mauer, Austria
- Died: 10 August 1922 (aged 69); Birmingham, UK
- Education: Federal Polytechnic Zurich

Gisbert Johann Eduard Kapp (2 September 1852 – 10 August 1922) was an Austrian-English electrical engineer.

His parents were the Austrian counselor Gisbert Sebastian Kapp (1816-1857) and Luisa Kapp-Young. After finishing school in Vienna, Austria and Prague, Czechia, Kapp studied mechanical engineering at the then Federal Polytechnic Zurich, which is now know under the name ETH Zürich. He gained practical experience as a ship's engineer and in a machine factory in Augsburg, Germany, for a year each, before serving for two years in the Austrian navy, based in the then Austrian Trieste. He came to England in 1875, where he took up work in the industry, designing and selling large pumps across Europe. The International Exposition of Electricity in Paris 1881 brought him in contact with Electrical Engineering, the science he dedicated his future career to. He was naturalised in Britain the same year.

He was awarded a Telford Medal in 1885/6. In 1904 he was offered the position as the first Chair of Electrical Engineering at the University of Birmingham, a post he held until 1919. In 1909 he was elected the president of the Institution of Electrical Engineers.

Kapp developed the basis for the calculation and construction of alternating current, dynamos and the transformer. The Electronic, Electrical & Systems Engineering Department at the University of Birmingham was situated in a building named after him in November 1972 until 2020, when the department moved to the new engineering building near the west gate.
