= Theodore Bayard Fletcher Copp =

American author

- Born: May 22, 1902; Brookline, Massachusetts
- Died: January 3, 1945 (aged 42); Greenburgh, New York
- Other name: Ted Copp
- Parent(s): Evelyn Fletcher Copp; Alfred E. Copp

Theodore Bayard Fletcher Copp (May 22, 1902 – January 2, 1945) was a writer of adventure stories.

== Biography ==
He was born on May 22, 1902, to Maude Evelyn Fletcher and Alfred E. Copp in Brookline, Massachusetts.

His mother died on January 1, 1945. He died in his sleep of a myocardial infarction on January 2, 1945, right after completing his mother's obituary.

== Publications ==
- The Bridge of Bombers (1941)
- The Mystery of Devil's Hand (1941)
- The Phantom Fleet (1942)
