= Evelyn Fletcher Copp =

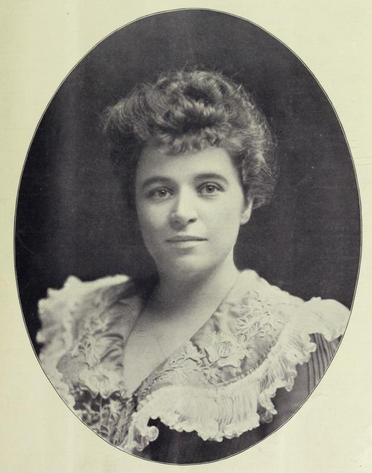
- Evelyn Ashton Fletcher Copp, from a 1901 publication
- Born: Maude Evelyn Ashton Fletcher; February 4, 1872; Woodstock, Ontario
- Died: January 2, 1945 (aged 72); Manhattan, New York City
- Spouse: Alfred Ebenezer Copp
- Children: Theodore Bayard Fletcher Copp
- Parent(s): Ashton Fletcher; Anne Stidston

Maude Evelyn Ashton Fletcher Copp (February 4, 1872 – January 2, 1945) created a method for teaching children how to play the piano: the Fletcher Music Method.

Copp influenced music educationalist Nellie Cornish, who studied the visual method with her in Boston and for a time taught it in Seattle prior to founding her Cornish School. She describes the method in her autobiography Miss Aunt Nellie:

Following the approach of Montessori, who introduced children to organized work through the sense of touch, Mrs. Copp invented contrivances to acquaint them with music symbols. She devised a piano keyboard which could be taken apart and put together; a note was printed on each key, and the child was expected to associate key and note … Notes were cut out of thin wood, the form of the note representing relative durations; and there were time blocks to give the child an acquaintance with rhythmic symbols. There were also chord blocks, dolls to teach scales, etc. Children were taught in groups of four and five. The toylike equipment and the games that resulted pleased children and interested parents.

== Biography ==
She was born on February 4, 1872, as Maude Evelyn Ashton Fletcher in Woodstock, Ontario to Ashton Fletcher and Annie Stedson. She married Alfred Ebenezer Copp on May 8, 1901, in Manhattan, New York City, and had a son, Theodore Bayard Fletcher Copp (1902–1945), who became an author.

She died on January 2, 1945. Her son died the next day, right after completing his mother's obituary.

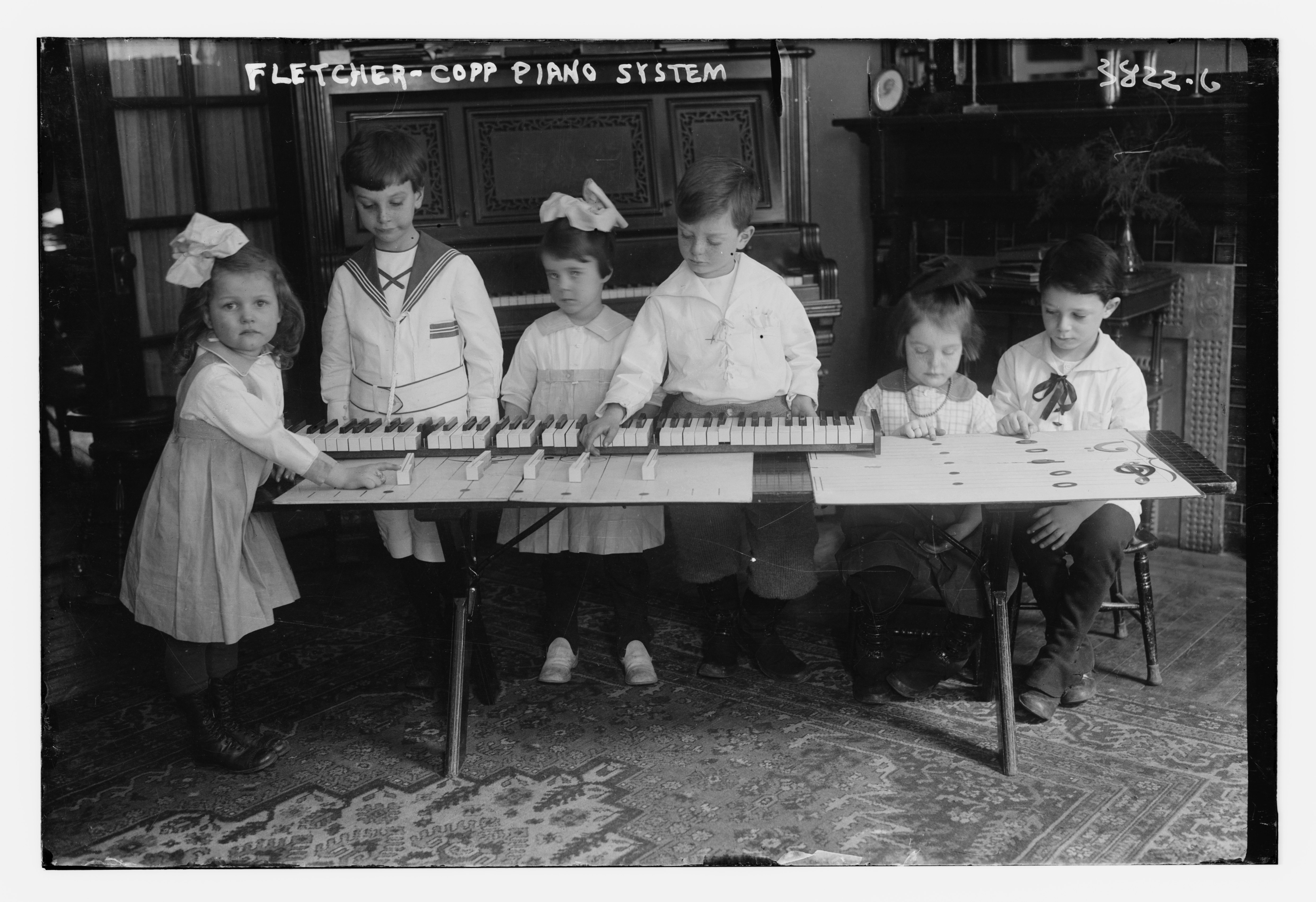
Demonstration of Fletcher-Copp piano system
