= Spion Kop =

Spion Kop may refer to:

- Spion Kop (hill) or Spioenkop, a hill in South Africa
  - Spion Kop (stadiums) (or Kop), the colloquial for a number of sports terraces and stands, originally from their resemblance to the hill
  - Battle of Spion Kop, a battle fought during the Second Boer War in 1900 on Spion Kop
    - Spion Kop, Nottinghamshire, a small village named after the battle
    - In the short story "Rallying Round Old George" in the collection My Man Jeeves by P. G. Wodehouse, "Spion Kop" is used as a metaphor (in reference to the battle) for a noisy argument.
- Spion Kop (horse) (1917–1941), winner of the 1920 Epsom Derby
- SAS Spioenkop (F147), South African Navy frigate
