= Alexander Kapp (dermatologist and allergist) =

German dermatologist and medical professor (born 1955)

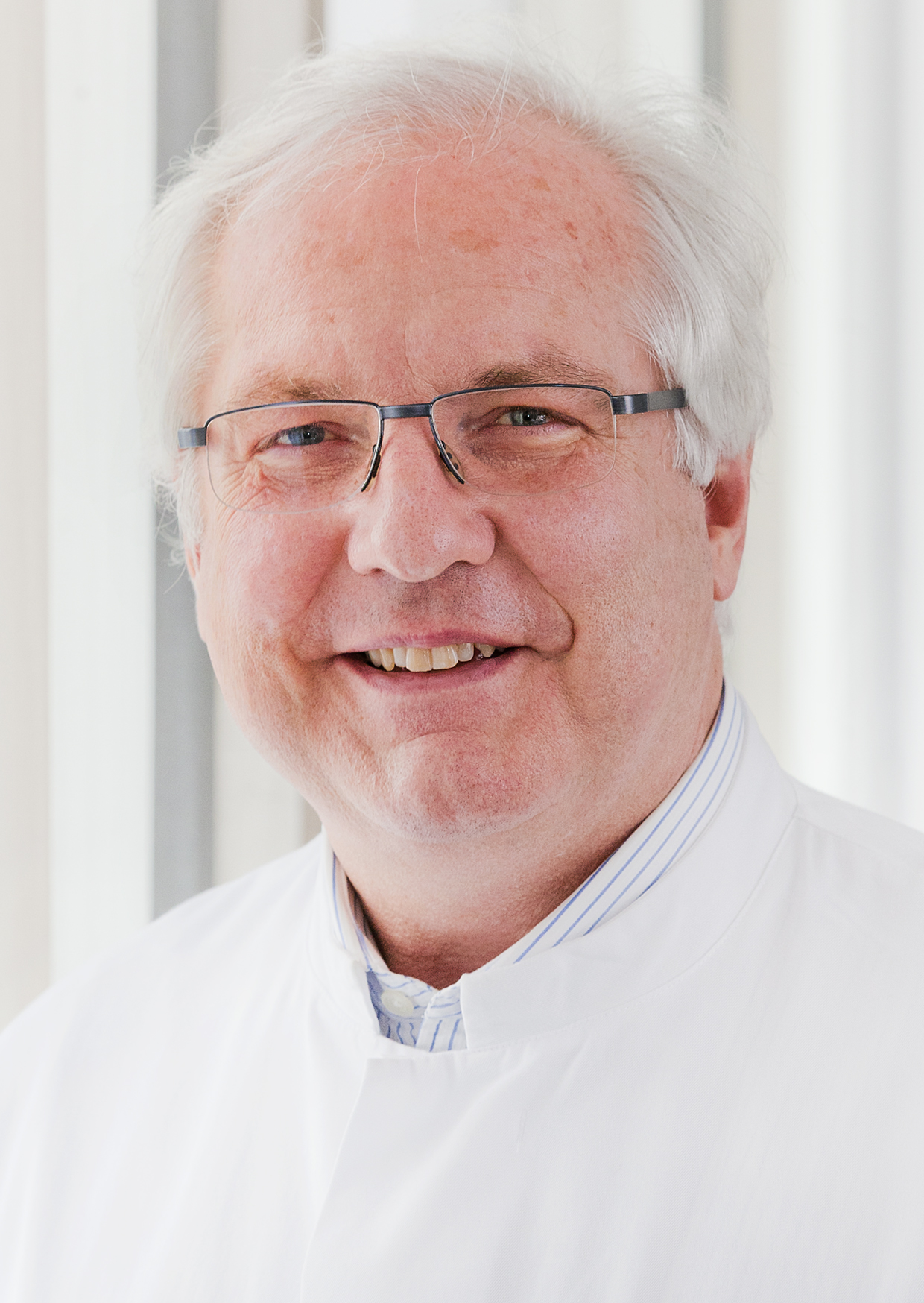
- Born: February 28, 1955 (age 71); Heidelberg, Germany
- Known for: Pathophysiology of inflammatory skin diseases (atopic dermatitis, psoriasis)
- Awards: Herbert-Herxheimer-Advancement Award (1993/96), Herbert-Herxheimer Memorial Award (1999), Erich-Fuchs Award (2013)
- Scientific career
- Fields: Dermatology, allergy
- Workplaces: Hannover Medical School

Alexander Kapp (born 28 February 1955) is a German dermatologist and allergist. He was chairman and medical director of the department of dermatology and allergy at the Hannover Medical School until his retirement in 2022. He is known for his work in the field of pathophysiology of inflammatory skin diseases (atopic dermatitis, psoriasis), his research on neuro-immunological interactions in allergic inflammation and on the role of eosinophilic granulocytes in allergy and dermatology.

== Biography ==
Kapp was born in Heidelberg studied human medicine at the University of Heidelberg; Germany, from 1974 to 1980 and qualified in 1980 as medical doctor with his thesis on " T-lymphocyte function in atopic dermatitis". He then spent research fellowships at the University of Heidelberg, the University of Freiburg, and the Max-Planck-Institute of Immunobiology in Freiburg. After the residency in dermatology at the University of Freiburg, he received board certification in dermatology and allergy in 1987. In 1988, he became Associate Professor for Dermatology and Venereology and in 1990 head of the section Allergy and Immunological Diagnostics at the University of Freiburg. Since 1994, he has held the position of professor, chairman and director of the Department of Dermatology and Allergy at the Hannover Medical School.

== Scientific contribution ==
Kapp worked in the field of in vitro diagnostics of allergic diseases. However, his main research interest lies in the pathophysiology of inflammatory skin diseases, particularly atopic dermatitis and psoriasis. His main focus in allergy research is in the field of insect allergies and allergic rhinitis, particularly the specific immunotherapy of these diseases, as well as diagnostic and treatment of urticarial. Genetics, diagnostic and treatment of malignant skin tumours are also in the focus of his scientific work. Kapp participated in the development of national and European guidelines on allergy. He was clinical investigator in various clinical studies as well as study director of national and European clinical multicenter studies in the field of dermatology and allergy as well as conductor and coordinator of various in vitro studies in the field of inflammation research and allergy.

== Honors and awards ==
- 1993 Herbert-Herxheimer-Advancement Award of the German Society for Allergy and Clinical Immunology (DGAKI) (together with W. Czech, J. Krutmann, A. Budnik and E. Schöpf)
- 1996 Herbert-Herxheimer-Advancement Award of the German Society for Allergy and Clinical Immunology (together with T. Werfel, M. Hentschel and H. Renz)
- 1999 Herbert-Herxheimer Memorial Award of the German Society for Allergy and Clinical Immunology (together with B. Wedi, U. Raap and H. Lewrick)
- 2013 Erich-Fuchs Award of the Ärzteverband Deutscher Allergologen e.V. for Kapp's extraordinary merits in the area of allergy, clinical immunology and dermatology.
