= Mauer, Vienna =

Coordinates: 48°09′02″N 16°16′08″E

Mauer

Coat of arms

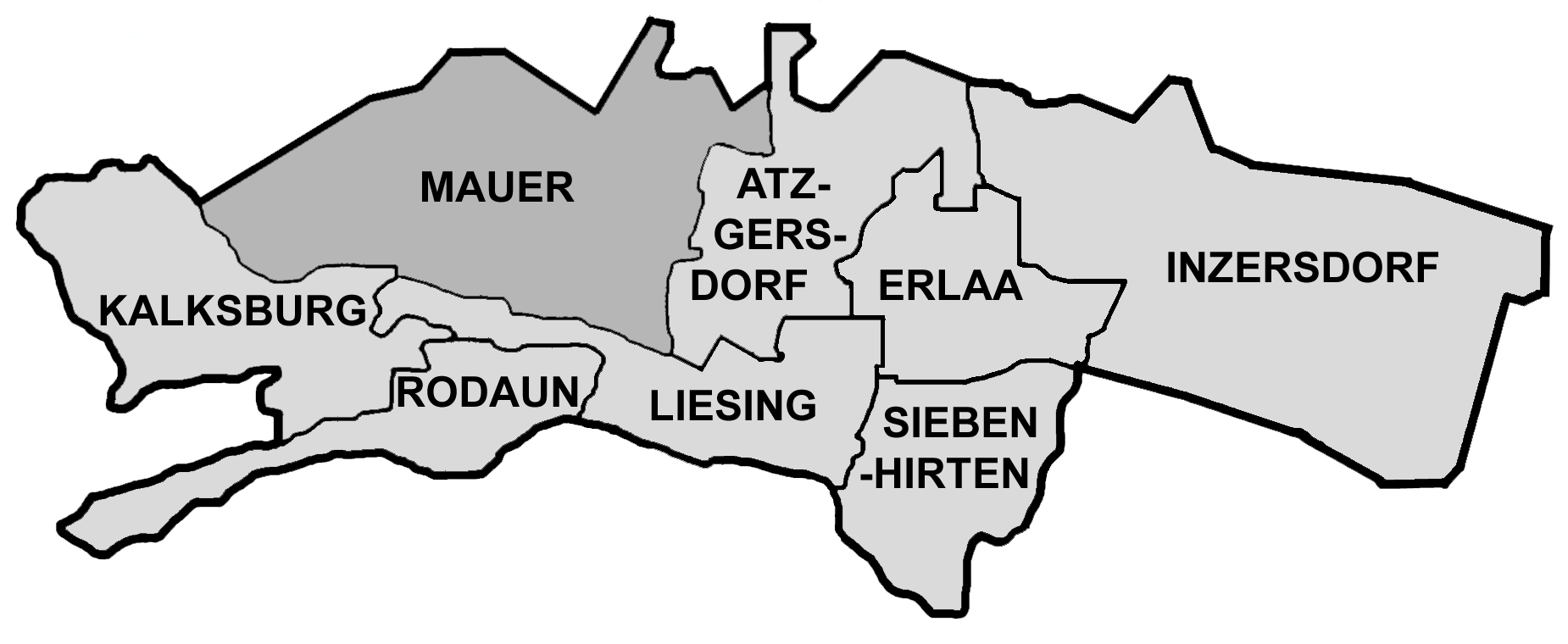
Location in Liesing

Mauer (German pronunciation: [ˈmaʊɐ]; German for "wall"; Central Bavarian: Maua) is a former village of Lower Austria that has been part of Vienna since 1938. Today's cadastral community belongs to the 23rd District of Vienna, called Liesing. In the west, Mauer borders the Vienna Woods.

== History ==
A jasper mine was located in Mauer during the Neolithic. The first official mention of the village dates back to 1210. Wine production began during the Middle Ages, and still continues today. The Society of Jesus controlled the village from 1609 to 1773. In Biedermeier times Mauer was a famous Viennese summer retreat location. The first mayor took office in 1850, and the village was promoted to market town in 1902. After Nazi Germany annexed Austria, the City of Vienna was expanded greatly, which led to the incorporation of Mauer in 1938. The Rosenhügel Film Studios, which were built from 1919 to 1923 in the north of Mauer, were considered at their opening as the most modern and largest film studios in Austria. Almost all buildings were demolished in 2016.

== Viticulture ==
A few decades ago there were dozens of winemakers in Mauer, whose number has gradually decreased over the years. Nevertheless, there are still a lot of winemakers that continue Mauer's nationally and internationally acclaimed viticulture tradition. The best known are the Edlmoser and Zahel families.

Mauer's wine-growing area is divided into three locations: Maurer Berg, Kroissberg and Kadoltsberg. The region is known for producing outstanding white wines such as Sauvignon Blanc, Gelber Muskateller, Riesling, Chardonnay, Grüner Veltliner and especially Viennese Gemischter Satz. Winemakers operate local wine taverns (so-called "Heuriger"), which are mostly located at Maurer Lange Gasse. Unlike many Heuriger in Grinzing and Neustift am Walde, Mauer is hardly frequented by tourists, preserving a true and original vibe. The location was featured in season 7 of Anthony Bourdain: No Reservations.

== Transportation ==
Mauer's main access to public transportation is the 60 tram line, which runs from Westbahnhof terminal (intercity trains and metro station) via Hietzing to Rodaun. Additionally, several bus lines serve the area. Mauer also shares a S-Bahn train stop with neighboring Atzgersdorf at its eastern border.

== Notable people ==
- John (Johann) Banner (1910–1973), Jewish actor, later American
- Hanns Hörbiger (1860, Atzgersdorf - 1931)
- La Jana (1905–1940), Austrian-German dancer and actress
- Gisbert Kapp (1852–1922), Austrian-English electrical engineer
- Karl Mayreder (1856–1935), architect
- Joseph von Scheda (1815, Padua - 1888), German-Austrian military man, cartographer (de)
- Friedrich Schreyvogl (1899–1976), writer, publicist, dramaturgist (de)
- Marija Sklad-Sauer (born 1935, Budapest), Hungarian (Polish father)-Vojvodinan, later Austrian female singer, song educator (de)
