= Mary Eugenia Kapp =

American chemist (1909–1983)

- Born: April 15, 1909; Mount Airy, North Carolina, U.S.
- Died: November 19, 1983 (aged 74); Richmond, Virginia, U.S.
- Education: North Carolina College for Women (A.B.); Duke University (M.A.); University of North Carolina at Chapel Hill (PhD)
- Scientific career
- Fields: Chemistry
- Workplaces: Blackstone College for Girls (1931–1934); Averett College (1938–1939); Sophie Newcomb College (1939–1940); DuPont de Nemours (1942–1946); Virginia Commonwealth University (1940–1942, 1946–1973)
- Thesis: A Semi-Micro Scheme of Qualitative Analysis for the Anions (1939)

Mary Eugenia Kapp (April 15, 1909 – November 19, 1983) was an American chemist.

== Early life and education ==
Mary Eugenia Kapp was born on April 15, 1909, in Mount Airy, North Carolina, to Dr. E. C. Kapp and his wife. She received an A.B. degree from the North Carolina College for Women (now University of North Carolina at Greensboro) in 1931. Kapp graduated with a M.A. from Duke University in 1931. She graduated with a PhD in analytical chemistry from the University of North Carolina at Chapel Hill in 1939. Her thesis was entitled A Semi-Micro Scheme of Qualitative Analysis for the Anions.

== Career ==
From 1931 to 1934, Kapp was the head of the science department at Blackstone College for Girls. From 1938 to 1939, she was the head of the science department at Averett College. From 1939 to 1940, Kapp was a chemistry instructor at the Sophie Newcomb College of Tulane University.

In 1940, she joined the faculty of Richmond Professional Institute (RPI) of the College of William and Mary as an associate professor of chemistry and head of the chemistry department. From June 15, 1942, to 1946, Kapp worked as an associate chief of chemistry at DuPont de Nemours in Richmond.

In 1946, Kapp returned to RPI as an associate professor. In 1952, she was promoted to professor and became the chair of the School of Applied Sciences, along with remaining the chair of the chemistry department. She remained with RPI when it merged with the Medical College of Virginia to become the Virginia Commonwealth University in 1968. In 1970, she stepped down as chair of the chemistry department and retired in July 1973.

Kapp was a fellow of the Virginia Academy of Sciences and a member of the American Chemical Society. In 1952, she was elected as the first woman elected chair of the Virginia section of the American Chemical Society.

== Death ==
Kapp died on November 19, 1983, in Richmond.

== Awards and legacy ==
Kapp was awarded the Distinguished Service Award of the Virginia Section by the American Chemical Society in 1969. She was listed in Who's Who in America.

The Virginia Commonwealth University set up a lecture fund in her honor in 1973. The university hosts a chemist with an international reputation annually to speak at the Mary Kapp Lecture hosted in her honor.
