= Edmond Xavier Kapp =

English painter (1890–1978)

- Born: Edmond Xavier Kapp; 5 November 1890; London
- Died: 29 October 1978 (aged 87)
- Education: Christ's College, Cambridge
- Known for: Portrait painting and caricatures

Edmond Xavier Kapp (5 November 1890 – 29 October 1978) was a British portrait painter, draughtsman and caricaturist who during his career depicted many of the most famous politicians, artists and musicians of the time.

== Life and work ==
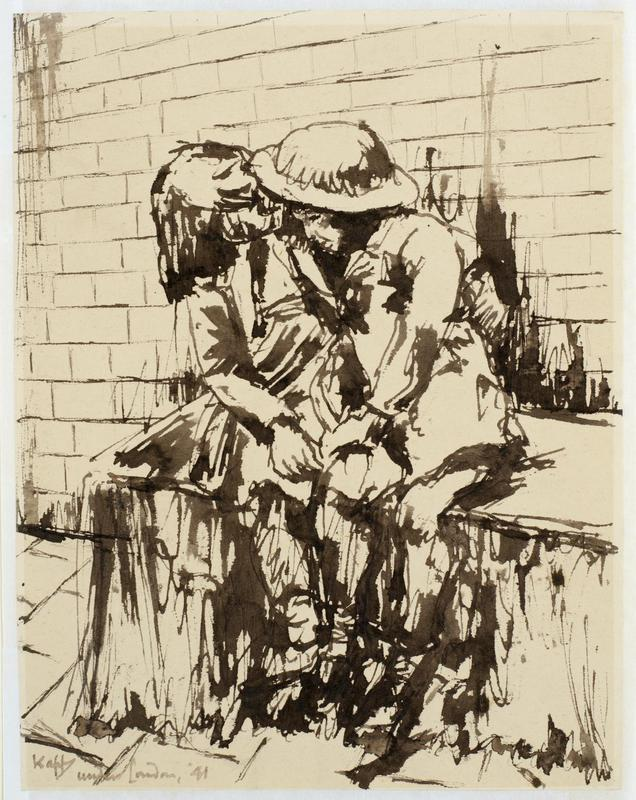
A Brother and Sister Sheltering in the Underground, 1941 (Art.IWM ART LD 795)

Kapp was born in London, the son of a German-born wine merchant who was a vice-president of the London Jewish Hospital. Kapp attended Dame Alice Owen's School and then Christ's College, Cambridge, where he studied for the Medieval and Modern Language Tripos. Whilst at Cambridge he had a number of caricatures published in both Granta and the Cambridge Magazine and had a one-man exhibition at the Fitzwilliam Museum in 1912. After leaving Cambridge he set up his own studio and was successful in selling his caricatures to various weekly and monthly periodicals.

In the First World War Kapp served in the British Army as a lieutenant with the Royal Sussex Regiment. He was gassed and, later in the conflict, worked in Intelligence at General Headquarters. After the war Kapp studied for a short period both in England, Paris and at Berlin University. He had a solo exhibition of drawings at the Leicester Galleries in 1922 and went on to have over several dozen solo shows in Britain and abroad. Throughout the 1920s Kapp published several volumes of his drawings and caricatures. Kapp produced a series of lithographs of diplomats at the League of Nations for the British Museum and the National Portrait Gallery.

From 1922 to 1930 Kapp was married to the writer and political activist Yvonne Helene Mayer (1903–1999). In 1932 he married the sculptor and painter Polia Chentoff who died the following year.

In the Second World War Kapp received several short commissions from the War Artists' Advisory Committee, most notably for a series called Life under London depicting people sheltering in the London Underground and in the crypt of St. Martin's-in-the-Fields during the Blitz. During 1946 and 1947 Kapp was commissioned by UNESCO to produce twenty portraits of the delegates at its first international congress in Paris.

By 1948 he was living in Roquebrune, which had become a haven for contemporary artists. Here he was well-connected: John Lewis recounts how Kapp – then going by the name of Peter Kapp – enabled him to meet Picasso in order to chivy the artist in the production of an artwork to be printed by W. S. Cowell Ltd. using their plastocowell technique.

In 1961 the Whitechapel Art Gallery held a retrospective of his work which included some 310 pieces. Shortly afterwards Kapp abandoned figurative work and fully embraced abstract painting. Further extensive exhibitions of his work were held at the Barber Institute of Fine Arts in both 1999 and 2001. Kapp's artwork is held in several national British collections, most notably those of the Victoria and Albert Museum and the National Portrait Gallery.

== Published works ==
- Personalities, Twenty-Four Drawings, (1919)
- Reflections, Twenty-Four Drawings, (1922)
- Ten Great Lawyers, (1924)
- Twenty-Eight Drawings, (1925)
- Pastiche, A Music Room Book, (1926)
- The Nations at Genevia, (1934–35)
