= Michael Graves (sound engineer) =

American audio engineer (born 1968)

- Born: December 23, 1968 (age 57)
- Occupation: Mastering engineer
- Years active: 1998-present
- Awards: Grammy Award for Best Historical Album: Written In Their Soul: The Stax Songwriter Demos (2024) It's Such A Good Feeling: The Best Of Mister Rogers (2021) Voices of Mississippi: Artists and Musicians Documented by William Ferris (2018) Hank Williams, The Garden Spot Programs, 1950 (2014) Art of Field Recording Volume I: Fifty Years of Traditional American Music Documented by Art Rosenbaum (2008) 9 other nominations Blues Music Award, Historical Album of the Year: Bobby Rush, Chicken Heads: A 50-Year History Of Bobby Rush (2017)
- Website: osirisstudio.com

Michael Graves (born December 23, 1968) is an American mastering engineer. He specializes in audio restoration and audio preservation. Graves is a 5-time Grammy Award-winner and a 17-time Grammy nominee. He is widely considered one of the best audio engineers in his field. Country singer Hank Williams' daughter Jett praised Graves' work on her father's Grammy-winning album The Garden Spot Programs, 1950, calling it "the best restoration I’ve ever heard before, the 1% of 1% of restoration engineering."

Graves has worked on a wide variety of archival musical projects, working with clients from around the world. Graves' main focus is historical audio that was recorded on deteriorating or obsolete media, as well as more recent recordings on which the sound is obscured for various reasons, utilizing tools and techniques to restore the original audio. His work has often been compared to that of an archaeologist because of Graves' similarly painstaking process of cleaning and restoring old and often damaged archival material. He works with such record labels as Dust-to-Digital, Analog Africa, The Numero Group and Omnivore Recordings, which specialize in historical recordings. He has also remastered recordings for commercial release by artists such as Hank Williams, Ray Charles, Joni Mitchell, Big Star, Blondie, Richard Hell, Janis Joplin, Stax Records, Nina Simone, Erroll Garner, Buck Owens and Bobby Rush.

Graves owns and operates Osiris Studio, a Los Angeles–based mastering and audio-restoration services facility that provides audio services to the entertainment and archival communities. The studio is named after the Egyptian god of resurrection, reflecting Graves' interest in bringing recordings "back to life."

== Early life ==
Graves grew up in Texas. He began collecting records from a young age, taking advantage of his father's free travel perks as a Delta Air Lines employee to visit record stores across the U.S. and Europe.

He graduated from Georgia State University.

== Career ==
Graves spent the early part of his career in Atlanta. He first became interested in audio restoration after receiving an early CD recorder as a gift in 1998. In the course of digitizing some rare records in his vinyl collection, he became interested in the possibilities of digital audio restoration.

In 2002, Graves founded Osiris Studio, initially working with private collectors to digitize and restore their music collections. In 2003, Graves was hired by Georgia State University to help digitize and preserve a substantial portion of its Johnny Mercer collection, one of the world's largest collections of commercial, home and unreleased recordings relating to noted songwriter Mercer. Graves continued working for Georgia State University, preserving assets in GSU's Southern Labor Archives.

Graves subsequently expanded his business, performing preservation services for the audio archives of such institutions as the National Park Service (Great Smoky Mountains, Joshua Tree, Sitka and Yosemite archives), Archives of the Episcopal Church, the Coca-Cola Company, Sacred Harp Publishing Company Archives, and the Centers for Disease Control's David J. Sencer CDC Museum.

In 2005, Graves met Steven Lance Ledbetter, co-owner of Dust-to-Digital, an influential Atlanta-based record label that specializes in documenting the history of American popular music, including historical recordings of blues, gospel and country music. Dust-to-Digital hired Graves to restore and master the recordings collected on its archival box set Fonotone Records: Frederick, Maryland (1956-1969). That project marked the beginning of a long-running collaboration between Graves and Dust-to-Digital, with Graves restoring and mastering the majority of the label's releases thereafter.

Graves won his first Grammy Award in 2009, for his work on Dust-to-Digital's four-CD box set Art of Field Recording, Vol. I: 50 Years of Traditional American Music Documented by Art Rosenbaum. The set won in the category of Best Historical Album, with Graves, as mastering engineer, sharing the award with the album's producers, Ledbetter and Art Rosenbaum.

In 2011, Graves began working with the archival label Analog Africa, restoring and mastering a large portion of that company's catalog, beginning with the album Bambara Mystic Soul: The Raw Sound of Burkina Faso 1974-1979.

Graves received a second Grammy nomination in 2012, for the Dust-to-Digital release Opika Pende: Africa at 78 RPM. The following year, he was nominated for another Dust-to-Digital project, Pictures of Sound: One Thousand Years of Educed Audio: 980-1980.

In 2013, after meeting company co-founder Cheryl Pawelski, Graves began a long-running relationship with the reissue label Omnivore Recordings. Graves' first project for Omnivore was his restoration of a set of 1950 Hank Williams recordings for the Garden Spot radio program. The resulting album, The Garden Spot Programs, won Graves his second Grammy award, again in the Best Historical Album category.

The same year, Graves was also nominated in the Grammy category of Best Historical Album for his work on the Dust-to-Digital release Longing for the Past: The 78 RPM Era in Southeast Asia.

In 2015, Graves assumed mastering and restoration duties for the compilation CD that accompanies the Oxford American magazine's annual music issue.

Graves earned a 2015 Grammy nomination, again in the Best Historical Album category, for his work on Dust-to-Digital's 2014 release Parchman Farm: Photographs and Field Recordings 1947-1959. This was followed by a 2016 Grammy nomination, for another Dust-to-Digital album, Music of Morocco: Recorded by Paul Bowles (Dust-to-Digital). Graves received two Best Historical Album Grammy nominations the following year, for Washington Phillips and His Manzarene Dreams (Dust-to-Digital) and Sweet As Broken Dates: Lost Somali Tapes from the Horn of Africa (Ostinato).

In 2018, Graves moved Osiris Studio to Los Angeles, where he has continued to work on a wide variety of archival releases. The same year, he won another Grammy award for Best Historical Album, for his work on Dust-to-Digital's Voices of Mississippi: Artists and Musicians Documented by William Ferris.

=== Other work ===
Graves is also affiliated with the Association for Recorded Sound Collections (ARSC) and the Audio Engineering Society (AES). He is also a board member and technical advisor to Music Memory, an organization dedicated to the preservation of large, rare 78 rpm collections.

Graves is a member of The Recording Academy, and The Recording Academy's Producers & Engineers Wing. He also served multiple terms on the Board of Governors in Atlanta and Los Angeles.

== Awards and nominations ==
=== Grammy Awards ===
Graves has won the Grammy Award for Best Historical Album five times, and has been nominated a further nine times.

Wins

- Written In Their Soul: The Stax Songwriter Demos (2024)
- It's Such A Good Feeling: The Best Of Mister Rogers (2021)
- Voices of Mississippi: Artists and Musicians Documented by William Ferris (2018)
- Hank Williams, The Garden Spot Programs, 1950 (2014)
- Art Of Field Recording Volume I: Fifty Years Of Traditional American Music Documented By Art Rosenbaum (2008)

Nominations

- Doc Pomus - You Can’t Hip A Square: The Doc Pomus Songwriting Demos (2025)
- Roots Rocking Zimbabwe - The Modern Sound of Harare' Townships 1975-1980 (2025)
- Super Disco Pirata - De Tepito Para El Mundo 1965-1980 (2025)
- Blondie, Against The Odds: 1974-1982 (2023)
- Excavated Shellac: An Alternate History of the World's Music (2022)
- Sweet As Broken Dates: Lost Somali Tapes From The Horn Of Africa (2017)
- Washington Phillips And His Manzarene Dreams (2017)
- Music Of Morocco From The Library Of Congress: Recorded By Paul Bowles, 1959 (2016)
- Parchman Farm: Photographs And Field Recordings, 1947–1959 (2015)
- Longing For The Past: The 78 RPM Era In Southeast Asia (2014)
- Pictures Of Sound: One Thousand Years Of Educed Audio: 980–1980 (2013)
- Opika Pende: Africa At 78 RPM (2012)

=== Blues Music Award ===
Graves also won a 2017 Blues Music Award in the category of Historical Album of the Year, for the Bobby Rush box set Chicken Heads: A 50-Year History Of Bobby Rush.

== Discography ==
- Sam Amidon, But This Chicken Proved Falsehearted (Omnivore), 2015, mastering
- Asylum Party, Borderline (Deanwell Global Music), 2018, mastering
- David Ball, Thinkin' Problem Demos EP (Omnivore), 2019, mastering
- David Ball, Thinkin' Problem (Omnivore), 2019, mastering
- Chris Bell, Looking Forward: The Roots of Big Star (Omnivore), 2017, mastering/restoration
- Chris Bell, I Am The Cosmos (Omnivore), 2017, mastering/restoration
- Chris Bell, The Complete Chris Bell (Omnivore), 2017, mastering/restoration
- Cindy Lee Berryhill, Straight Outta Marysville (Omnivore), 2019, mastering/restoration
- Cindy Lee Berryhill, Garage Orchestra (Omnivore), 2019, mastering
- Big Star, Live In Memphis (Omnivore), 2014, mastering/restoration
- Big Star, Live At Lafayette's Music Room (Omnivore), 2018, mastering/restoration
- Big Star, Live on WLIR (Omnivore), 2019, mastering/restoration
- Big Star, In Space (Omnivore), 2019, mastering
- Big Star, Complete Third (Omnivore), 2016, mastering/restoration
- The Blind Boys of Alabama, Spirit of the Century (Omnivore), 2016, mastering/restoration
- The Blind Boys of Alabama, Higher Ground (Omnivore), 2016, mastering/restoration
- The Blind Boys of Alabama, Atom Bomb (Omnivore), 2016, mastering/restoration
- The Blind Boys of Alabama, Go Tell It On The Mountain (Omnivore), 2016, mastering/restoration
- Cait Brennan, Third (Omnivore), 2017, mastering
- Joanna Brouk, The Space Between (Numero Group), 2019, mastering/restoration
- Tom Brumley and The Buckaroos, Steelin' The Show (Omnivore), 2018, mastering
- Tim Buckley, Wings: The Complete Singles 1966-1974 (Omnivore), 2016, mastering/restoration
- Sandy Bull, Steel Tears // Endventions & Tributes (Omnivore), 2018, mastering
- Junior Byles, Rasta No Pickpocket (Omnivore), 2018, mastering
- Alex Chilton, A Man Called Destruction (Omnivore), 2017, mastering
- Alex Chilton, My Rival (Omnivore), 2019, mastering
- The Choir, Last Call: Live at The Music Box (Omnivore), 2020, mastering
- Gene Clark, Gene Clark Sings For You (Omnivore), 2018, mastering/restoration
- Sanford Clark, They Call Me Country (Numero Group), 2019, mastering/restoration
- Dennis Coffey, One Night At Morey's: 1968 (Omnivore), 2018, mastering
- Dennis Coffey, Live At Baker's (Omnivore), 2019, mastering
- Johnny Costa, Plays Mister Rogers Neighborhood Jazz (Omnivore), 2019, mastering/restoration
- The Crests, The Best of the Crests featuring Johnny Maestro: 16 Fabulous Hits (Omnivore), 2020, mastering/restoration
- Culture, The Nighthawk (Omnivore), 2019, mastering
- Mestre Cupijo, Siria (Analog Africa), 2014, mastering/restoration
- Curlew, 1st Album + Live at CBGB 1980 (DMG ARC), 2008, mastering/restoration
- Bobby Darin & Johnny Mercer, Two of A Kind (Omnivore), 2017, mastering/restoration
- Carmaig de Forest, I Shall Be Re-Released (Omnivore), 2017, mastering
- The dB's & Friends, Christmas Time Again! (Omnivore), 2015, mastering
- Dr. John, The Atco/Atlantic Singles 1968-1974 (Omnivore), 2015, mastering/restoration
- The Duprees, The Coed Singles (Omnivore), 2020, mastering/restoration
- The Duprees, The Coed Albums: You Belong To Me/Have You Heard (Omnivore), 2020, mastering/restoration
- Dur Dur of Somalia, Volume 1, Volume 2 & Previously Unreleased Tracks (Analog Africa), 2018, mastering/restoration
- Van Duren, Waiting: The Van Duren Story (Original Documentary Soundtrack) (Omnivore), 2019, mastering/restoration
- Brother Claude Ely, Ain't No Grave: The Life and Legacy of Brother Claude Ely (Dust-to-Digital), 2011, mastering/restoration
- Estrelando Embaixador, Tribo Massahi (Goma-Gringa), 2015, mastering/restoration
- Ethiopian & His All Stars, The Return Of Jack Sparrow (Omnivore), 2017, mastering
- Fastball, All The Pain Money Can Buy (Omnivore), 2018, mastering
- Maynard Ferguson, Live From San Francisco (Omnivore), 2015, mastering
- Maynard Ferguson, Storm (Omnivore), 2015, mastering
- Maynard Ferguson, Big Bop Nouveau (Omnivore), 2016, mastering
- Maynard Ferguson, Body & Soul (Omnivore), 2016, mastering
- Maynard Ferguson, Complete High Voltage (Omnivore), 2016, mastering
- Neil Finn/Paul Kelly, Goin' Your Way (Highlights) (Omnivore), 2015, mastering
- Neil Finn/Paul Kelly, Goin' Your Way (Omnivore), 2015, mastering
- Dom Flemons, Prospect Hill: The American Songster Omnibus (Omnivore), 2020, mastering
- Slim Gaillard, Searching For You: The Lost Singles Of McVouty (1958-1974) (Sunset Blvd), 2016, mastering/restoration
- Game Theory, Across The Barrier Of Sound: PostScript (Omnivore), 2020, mastering/restoration
- Erroll Garner, One World Concert (Mack Avenue), 2019, mastering
- Erroll Garner, Closeup In Swing (Mack Avenue), 2019, mastering
- Erroll Garner, A Night At The Movies (Mack Avenue), 2019, mastering
- Erroll Garner, That's My Kick (Mack Avenue), 2020, mastering
- Erroll Garner, Feeling Is Believing (Mack Avenue), 2020, mastering
- Erroll Garner, Plays Gershwin & Kern (Mack Avenue), 2020, mastering
- Herb Geller, An American In Hamburg: The View From Here (Tramp), 2013, mastering/restoration
- Gene & Eddie, True Enough: Gene & Eddie With Sir Joe At Ru-Jac (Omnivore), 2016, mastering/restoration
- Don Gibson, The Best of the Hickory Years (1970-1978) (Omnivore), 2018, mastering
- Allen Ginsberg, The Last Word On First Blues (Omnivore), 2016, mastering/restoration
- Allen Ginsberg, The Complete Songs of Innocence and Experience (Omnivore), 2017, mastering/restoration
- Gladiators, Full Time (Omnivore), 2017, mastering
- Gladiators, Symbol of Reality (Omnivore), 2018, mastering
- Gladiators, Serious Thing (Omnivore), 2018, mastering
- Ethiopian & Gladiators, Dread Prophecy (Omnivore), 2018, mastering
- Andrew Gold, The Late Show: Live 1978 (Omnivore), 2015, mastering/restoration
- Andrew Gold, Something New: Unreleased Gold (Omnivore), 2020, mastering/restoration
- Steve Goodman, Artistic Hair (Omnivore), 2019, mastering/restoration
- Steve Goodman, Affordable Art (Omnivore), 2019, mastering/restoration
- Steve Goodman, Unfinished Business (Omnivore), 2019, mastering/restoration
- Steve Goodman, Santa Ana Winds (Omnivore), 2019, mastering/restoration
- Steve Goodman, Live '69 (Omnivore), 2020, mastering/restoration
- Vince Guaraldi, Oaxaca (D&D/Siriso), 2004, mastering/restoration
- Vince Guaraldi, With The San Francisco Boys Chorus (D&D/Siriso), 2005, mastering/restoration
- Vince Guaraldi, Oh, Good Grief! (Omnivore), 2018, mastering
- Vince Guaraldi, The Complete Warner Bros.-Seven Arts (Omnivore), 2018, mastering
- Arlo Guthrie, Alice-Before Time Began (Omnivore), 2018, mastering
- Arlo Guthrie, Alice's Restaurant: Original MGM Motion Picture Soundtrack (50th Anniversary Edition) (Omnivore), 2019, mastering/restoration
- Woody Guthrie, I Don't Like The Way This World's A-Treatin' Me (Omnivore), 2019, mastering/restoration
- John Wesley Harding, Greatest Other People's Hits (Omnivore), 2018, mastering
- Abu Obaida Hassan & His Tambour, The Shaigiya Sound of Sudan (Ostinato), 2018, mastering/restoration
- Bobby Hatfield, Stay With Me: The Richard Perry Sessions (Omnivore), 2020, mastering
- The Heaters, American Dream: The Portastudio (Omnivore), 2016, mastering
- Sid Hemphill, The Devil's Dream: Alan Lomax's 1942 Library of Congress (Global Jukebox/Mississippi), 2013, mastering/restoration
- Judy Henske & Jerry Yester, Farewell Aldebaran (Omnivore), 2016, mastering
- Justin Hinds, Know Jah Better (Omnivore), 2018, mastering
- Justin Hinds, Travel With Love (Omnivore), 2018, mastering
- Peter Holsapple vs. Alex Chilton, The Death Of Rock (Omnivore), 2018, mastering
- Peter Holsapple Combo, Christmas Must Be Tonight (Omnivore), 2019, mastering
- Jan and Dean, Filet Of Soul Redux: The Rejected Master (Omnivore), 2017, mastering/restoration
- Winston Jarrett and the Righteous Flames, Jonestown (Omnivore), 2018, mastering
- David Earle Johnson, John Abercrombie, Dan Wall, Route Two (Landslide), 2011, mastering/restoration
- Rev. Johnny L. "Hurricane" Jones, Jesus Christ from A to Z (Parlortone), 2009, mastering/restoration
- Chip & Tony Kinman, Sounds Like Music (Omnivore), 2019, mastering/restoration
- Kostas Bezos and the White Birds, Self Titled (Olvido/Mississippi), 2017, mastering/restoration
- A. Kostis, The Jail's a Fine School (Olvido/Mississippi), 2015, mastering/restoration
- Ernie Kovacs, The Ernie Kovacs Album: Centennial Edition (Omnivore), 2019, mastering/restoration
- Chad Lawson, The Space Between (Hillset), 2013, mastering
- Chad Lawson, The Chopin Variations (Hillset), 2014, mastering
- Chad Lawson, Bach Interpreted: Piano Variations on Bach Chorales (Hillset), 2016, mastering
- Chad Lawson, Dark Conclusions: The Lore Variations (Hillset), 2016, mastering
- Chad Lawson, A Grave Mistake: The Lore Variations (Hillset), 2017, mastering
- Chad Lawson, re:piano (Hillset), 2018, mastering
- Chad Lawson, Home Sweet Home: The 2018 Lore Variations (Hillset), 2018, mastering
- Selwyn Lissack, Friendship Next Of Kin (DMG ARC), 2006, mastering/restoration
- Little Nemo, Turquoise Fields (Deanwell Global Music), 2019, mastering
- Malo, Latin Bugaloo: The Warner Bros. Singles (Omnivore), 2018, mastering
- Kate & Anna McGarrigle, Pronto Monto (Omnivore), 2016, mastering
- Tommy McGee, I'm A Stranger (Numero Group), 2020, mastering/restoration
- The Miamis, We Deliver: The Lost Band of the CBGB Era (1974-1979), 2016, mastering
- Hamlet Minassian, Armenian Pop Music (Numero Group), 2019, mastering/restoration
- The Modern Mannequins, Discography 1983-1985 (Deanwell Global Music), 2018, mastering/restoration
- Orchestre Poly-Rythmo de Cotonou, Orchestre Poly-Rythmo de Cotonou (Goma-Gringa), 2014, mastering/restoration
- Orchestre Poly-Rythmo de Cotonou, Vol. 3: The Skeletal Essences of Afro Funk 1969-1980 (Analog Africa), 2013, mastering/restoration
- Buck Owens, The Complete Capitol Singles: 1957-1966 (Omnivore), 2016, mastering
- Buck Owens, Country Singer's Prayer (Omnivore), 2018, mastering
- Buck Owens, Buck 'Em! Volume Two: The Music Of Buck Owens (1967-1975) (Omnivore), 2015, mastering
- Buck Owens and the Buckaroos, The Complete Capitol Singles: 1967-1970 (Omnivore), 2018, mastering
- Buck Owens and the Buckaroos, The Complete Capitol Singles: 1971-1975 (Omnivore), 2019, mastering
- Winfield Parker, Mr. Clean: Winfield Parker at Ru-Jac (Omnivore), 2016, mastering/restoration
- Art Pepper, Art Pepper Presents "West Coast Sessions!" Volume 1: Sonny Stitt (Omnivore), 2017, mastering/restoration
- Art Pepper, Art Pepper Presents "West Coast Sessions!" Volume 2: Pete Jolly (Omnivore), 2017, mastering/restoration
- Art Pepper, The Art Pepper Quartet (Omnivore), 2017, mastering/restoration
- Art Pepper, Art Pepper Presents "West Coast Sessions!" Volume 3: Lee Konitz (Omnivore), 2017, mastering/restoration
- Art Pepper, Art Pepper Presents "West Coast Sessions!" Volume 4: Bill Watrous (Omnivore), 2017, mastering/restoration
- Art Pepper, Art Pepper Presents "West Coast Sessions!" Volume 5: Jack Sheldon (Omnivore), 2017, mastering/restoration
- Art Pepper, Promise Kept: The Complete Artists House (Omnivore), 2019, mastering/restoration
- Permanent Green Light, Hallucinations (Omnivore), 2018, mastering
- Washington Phillips, Washington Phillips & His Manzarene Dreams (Dust-to-Digital), 2016, mastering/restoration
- Picture One, Bright Spot and The Midnight Sun (Deanwell Global Music), 2019, mastering
- Picture One, Across The Depth of Seven Lakes (Deanwell Global Music), 2020, mastering
- Leroy Jodie Pierson, Rusty Nail (Omnivore), 2019, mastering
- Ranil, y su Conjunto Tropical (Analog Africa), 2020, mastering/restoration
- Piano Red, The Lost Atlanta Tapes (Landslide), 2010, mastering/restoration
- Blind Alfred Reed, Appalachian Visionary (Dust-to-Digital), 2016, mastering/restoration
- Ola Belle Reed, Southern Mountain Music on the Mason-Dixon Line (Dust-to-Digital), 2015, mastering/restoration
- Don Rich, Guitar Pickin' Man (Omnivore), 2016, mastering
- The Rivieras, The Coed Albums (Omnivore), 2020, mastering/restoration
- Mister Rogers, It's Such A Good Feeling: The Best Of Mister Rogers (Omnivore), 2019, mastering/restoration
- The Rose Garden, A Trip Through The Garden: The Rose Garden Collection (Omnivore), 2018, mastering/restoration
- Rosebud, Rosebud (Omnivore), 2017, mastering/restoration
- Rupa, Disco Jazz (Numero Group), 2019, mastering/restoration
- Bobby Rush, Chicken Heads: A 50-Year History Of Bobby Rush (Omnivore), 2015, mastering/restoration
- Jorge Santana, Love The Way: The Solo '70s (Omnivore), 2018, mastering/restoration
- The Searchers, Another Night: The Sire 1979-1981 (Omnivore), 2017, mastering
- Johnny Shines, The Blues Came Falling Down (Omnivore), 2019, mastering/restoration
- Nina Simone, Mood Indigo: The Complete Bethlehem Singles (BMG), 2018, mastering/restoration
- J.B. Smith, No More Good Time in the World for Me (Dust-to-Digital), 2015, mastering/restoration
- Elder Utah Smith and Various Artists, I Got Two Wings (CaseQuarter), 2008, mastering/restoration
- Sneakers, Sneakers (Omnivore), 2014, mastering/restoration
- Soul Asylum, Say What You Will... Everything Can Happen (Omnivore), 2018, mastering/restoration
- Soul Asylum, Made to Be Broken (Omnivore), 2018, mastering/restoration
- Soul Asylum, The Twin/Tone Years (Omnivore), 2018, mastering/restoration
- Soul Asylum, While You Were Out (Omnivore), 2019, mastering/restoration
- Soul Asylum, Clam Dip & Other Delights (Omnivore), 2019, mastering/restoration
- Soul Asylum, Twin/Tone Extras (Omnivore), 2019, mastering/restoration
- JD Souther, John David Souther (Omnivore), 2015, mastering
- JD Souther, Black Rose (Omnivore), 2016, mastering
- The Staple Singers, Let's Do It Again: Original Soundtrack (Omnivore), 2020, mastering
- The Staple Singers, Pass It On (Omnivore), 2020, mastering
- The Staples, Unlock Your Mind (Omnivore), 2020, mastering
- The Staples, Family Tree (Omnivore), 2020, mastering
- Star Band de Dakar, Psicodelia Afro-Cubana de Senegal (Ostinato), 2019, mastering/restoration
- Nino Tempo, Purveyor Of Balladry: The Best Of Nino Tempo On Atlantic (Omnivore), 2018, mastering/restoration
- Lindsay Tomasic, Songs From The 6th Floor (Datolite), 2019, mastering
- Amara Toure, Amara Toure (1973-1980) (Analog Africa), 2015, mastering/restoration
- Henry Townsend, Mule (Omnivore), 2018, mastering/restoration
- Henry Townsend and Roosevelt Sykes, Blues Piano And Guitar (Omnivore), 2019, mastering/restoration
- Uncle Walt's Band, Uncle Walt's Band (Omnivore), 2019, mastering/restoration
- Uncle Walt's Band, Anthology: Those Boys From Carolina, They Sure Enough Could Sing... (Omnivore), 2018, mastering/restoration
- Uncle Walt's Band, An American In Texas (Omnivore), 2019, mastering/restoration
- Various Artists, ...i listen to the wind that obliterates my traces: music in vernacular photographs 1880-1955 (Dust-to-Digital), 2011, mastering/restoration
- Various Artists, Afrobeat Airways 2: Return Flight to Ghana 1974-1983 (Analog Africa), 2013, mastering/restoration
- Various Artists, Angola Soundtrack 2 – Hypnosis, Distortions & Other Sonic Innovations 1969–1978 (Analog Africa), 2013, mastering/restoration
- Various Artists, Arkansas at 78 RPM: Corn Dodgers and Hoss Hair Pullers (Dust-to-Digital), 2014, mastering/restoration
- Various Artists, Art of Field Recording, Vol. I: 50 Years of Traditional American Music Documented by Art Rosenbaum (Dust-to-Digital), 2007, mastering/restoration
- Various Artists, Art of Field Recording, Vol. II: 50 Years of Traditional American Music Documented by Art Rosenbaum (Dust-to-Digital), 2009, mastering/restoration
- Various Artists, Art of Field Recording: Sampler (Dust-to-Digital), 2006, mastering/restoration
- Various Artists, Bambara Mystic Soul: The Raw Sound of Burkina Faso 1974-1979 (Analog Africa), 2011, mastering/restoration
- Various Artists, Before The Boomerang Came Back - Musical Aboriginalia (1949-1962) (Rouseabout), 2020, mastering/restoration
- Various Artists, Black Mirror (Dust-to-Digital), 2007, mastering/restoration
- Various Artists, Country Music of Western Kenya: 45s from the Archive of Shem Tupe (Olvido), 2017, mastering/restoration
- Various Artists, Desperate Man Blues (Soundtrack) (Dust-to-Digital), 2006, mastering/restoration
- Various Artists, Diablos del Ritmo: The Colombian Melting Pot 1960–1985 (Analog Africa), 2012, mastering/restoration
- Various Artists, Don't Think I've Forgotten: Cambodia's Lost Rock and Roll (Dust-to-Digital), 2015, mastering/restoration
- Various Artists, Drop On Down In Florida: Field Of African American Traditional Music 1977-1980 (Dust-to-Digital), 2012, mastering/restoration
- Various Artists, Excavated Shellac: Reeds (Dust-to-Digital), 2015, mastering/restoration
- Various Artists, Excavated Shellac: Strings (Parlortone), 2010, mastering/restoration
- Various Artists, Folksongs of Another America: Field from the Upper Midwest, 1937-1946 (Dust-to-Digital), 2015, mastering/restoration
- Various Artists, Fonotone (Dust-to-Digital), 2005, mastering/restoration
- Various Artists, Greek Rhapsody: Instrumental Music From Greece 1905-1956 (Dust-to-Digital), 2013, mastering/restoration
- Various Artists, How Low Can You Go? Anthology Of The String Bass (Dust-to-Digital), 2006, mastering/restoration
- Various Artists, I Belong To This Band (Soundtrack) (Dust-to-Digital), 2006, mastering/restoration
- Various Artists, Indian Talking Machine (Sublime Frequencies), 2015, mastering/restoration
- Various Artists, Jambu e Os Miticos Sons Da Amazonia (Analog Africa), 2019, mastering/restoration
- Various Artists, Joe Bussard Presents: The Year of Jubilo - 78 RPM of Songs from the Civil War (Dust-to-Digital), 2015, mastering/restoration
- Various Artists, Kassidat: Raw 45s From Morocco (Dust-to-Digital), 2013, mastering/restoration
- Various Artists, Lead Kindly Light (Dust-to-Digital), 2014, mastering/restoration
- Various Artists, Legend of Funana: Forbidden Music of the Capes (Analog Africa), 2016, mastering/restoration
- Various Artists, Listen All Around: The Golden Age Of Central And East African Music (Dust-to-Digital), 2018, mastering/restoration
- Various Artists, Longing for the Past: The 78 RPM Era In Southeast Asia (Dust-to-Digital), 2013, mastering/restoration
- Various Artists, Louis Wayne Moody High (Numero Group), 2020, mastering/restoration
- Various Artists, Luk Thung: Classic & Obscure 78s from the Thai Countryside (Parlortone), 2011, mastering/restoration
- Various Artists, Medium: Paranormal Field and Compositions, 1901-2017 (Zuckerman Museum of Art), 2017, mastering/restoration
- Various Artists, Melodii Tuvi: Throat Songs and Folk Tunes from Tuva (Dust-to-Digital), 2007, mastering/restoration
- Various Artists, Music of Morocco: Recorded by Paul Bowles (Dust-to-Digital), 2016, mastering/restoration
- Various Artists, Never a Pal Like Mother: Vintage Songs & Photographs of the One Who's Always True (Dust-to-Digital), 2011, mastering/restoration
- Various Artists, Opika Pende: Africa at 78 RPM (Dust-to-Digital), 2011, mastering/restoration
- Various Artists, The Oxford American Magazine's 17th Southern Music Issue: Georgia, Winter 2015 (Oxford American Magazine), 2015, mastering/restoration
- Various Artists, The Oxford American Magazine's 18th Southern Music Issue: Visions of the Blues, Winter 2016 (Oxford American Magazine), 2016, mastering/restoration
- Various Artists, The Oxford American Magazine's 19th Southern Music Issue: Kentucky, Winter 2017 (Oxford American Magazine), 2017, mastering/restoration
- Various Artists, The Oxford American Magazine's 20th Southern Music Issue: North Carolina, Winter 2018 (Oxford American Magazine), 2018, mastering/restoration
- Various Artists, The Oxford American Magazine's 21st Southern Music Issue: South Carolina, Winter 2019 (Oxford American Magazine), 2019, mastering/restoration
- Various Artists, Parchman Farm: Photographs and Field, 1947-1959 (Dust-to-Digital), 2014, mastering/restoration
- Various Artists, Passable In Pink (Omnivore), 2019, mastering
- Various Artists, Pictures Of Sound: One Thousand Years Of Educed Audio: 980-1980 (Dust-to-Digital), 2012, mastering/restoration
- Various Artists, Qat, Coffee & Qambus: Raw 45s from Yemen (Parlortone), 2012, mastering/restoration
- Various Artists, Rebita (Analog Africa), 2013, mastering/restoration
- Various Artists, The Ru-Jac Story Volume Four: 1967-1980 - Changes (Omnivore), 2018, mastering/restoration
- Various Artists, The Ru-Jac Story Volume One: 1963-1964 - Something Got A Hold On Me (Omnivore), 2018, mastering/restoration
- Various Artists, The Ru-Jac Story Volume Three: 1966-1967 - Finally Together (Omnivore), 2018, mastering/restoration
- Various Artists, The Ru-Jac Story Volume Two: 1964-1966 - Get Right (Omnivore), 2018, mastering/restoration
- Various Artists, The Ru-Jac Story Volumes 1-4: 1963-1980 - The Soul Of Baltimore (Omnivore), 2018, mastering/restoration
- Various Artists, Send I A Lion: A Nighthawk Reggae Joint (Omnivore), 2019, mastering
- Various Artists, Sorrow Come Pass Me Around: A Survey of Rural Black Religious Music (Dust-to-Digital), 2013, mastering/restoration
- Various Artists, Space Echo: The Mystery Behind the Cosmic Sound of Cabo Verde Finally Revealed (Analog Africa), 2016, mastering/restoration
- Various Artists, Sweet As Broken Dates: Lost Somali Tapes from the Horn of Africa (Ostinato), 2017, mastering/restoration
- Various Artists, Synthesize the Soul: Astro-Atlantic Hypnotica from the Cape Verde Islands 1973-1988 (Ostinato), 2017, mastering/restoration
- Various Artists, Tanbou Toujou Lou: Meringue, Kompa Kreyol, Vodou Jazz, & Electric Folklore from Haiti 1960-1981 (Ostinato), 2016, mastering/restoration
- Various Artists, Technicolor Paradise: Rhum Rhapsodies & Other Exotic Delights (Numero Group), 2018, mastering/restoration
- Various Artists, Two Miles to Sing a Melody: The Violins & Synths of Sudan (Ostinato), 2018, mastering/restoration
- Various Artists, Victrola Favorites (Dust-to-Digital), 2008, mastering/restoration
- Various Artists, Visible and Invisible Persons Distributed in Space (Numero Group), 2019, mastering/restoration
- Various Artists, Voices of Mississippi: Artists and Musicians Documented by William Ferris (Dust-to-Digital), 2018, mastering/restoration
- Various Artists, W2NG 89.9 FM (Numero Group), 2018, mastering/restoration
- Various Artists, The Winding Stream: The Carters, the Cashes and the Course of Country (Omnivore), 2015, mastering/restoration
- Various Artists, You're Not From Around Here (Numero Group), 2019, mastering/restoration
- Verckys et l´Orchestre Vévé, Congolese Funk Afrobeat & Psychedelic Rumba 1969 (Analog Africa), 2014, mastering/restoration
- Adam Wade, The Coed Albums: And Then Came Adam/Adam And Evening (Omnivore), 2020, mastering/restoration
- Dan Wall, Song For The Night (Landslide), 2011, mastering/restoration
- Elisa Waut, S/T (Numero Group), 2019, mastering/restoration
- Hank Williams, The Garden Spot Programs, 1950 EP (Omnivore), 2014, mastering/restoration
- Hank Williams, The Garden Spot Programs, 1950 (Omnivore), 2014, mastering/restoration
- Hank Williams, The First Recordings, 1938 (BMG), 2018, mastering/restoration
- Hank Williams, The Complete Health & Happiness (BMG), 2019, mastering/restoration
- Hank Williams, 1940 (BMG), 2019, mastering/restoration
- Hank Williams, Pictures From Life's Other Side (BMG), 2020, mastering/restoration
- Hank Williams, Only Mother's Best (BMG), 2020, mastering/restoration
- Brian Wilson and Van Dyke Parks, Orange Crate Art (Omnivore), 2020, mastering
- Steve Wynn, Kerosene Man (Omnivore), 2018, mastering
- Steve Wynn, Dazzling Display (Omnivore), 2018, mastering
- Jerry Yester, Pass Your Light Around (Omnivore), 2017, mastering
- Yum-Yum, Dan Loves Patti (Omnivore), 2018, mastering
- Alexis Zoumbas, Alexis Zoumbas (Olvido), 2019, mastering/restoration
