= Super Disco Pirata: De Tepito Para El Mundo 1965–1980 =

Compilation album

Compilation album by Various artists
- Released: 15 November 2024
- Genre: cumbia
- Length: 75:37
- Label: Analog Africa

Super Disco Pirata: De Tepito Para El Mundo 1965–1980 is a compilation album of bootleg cumbia remixes and rebajadas, released by Analog Africa on 15 November 2024.

== Background and release ==
Beginning in the 1940s Mexican sonideros – described by Carlos Tropicaza as "amateur mobile sound system operators, armed with a record player, amp and speaker" – offered a cheaper alternative to hiring a band at quinceañeras and other parties, and they helped to popularise Caribbean tropical music in Mexico. Sonideros grew in popularity, and some started travelling to South America to import records directly. By the 1980s a sophisticated bootleg record industry had emerged in the Tepito suburb of Mexico City, illegally reprinting copies and self-made compilations of tropical music records from across Latin America, predominantly Peru, Ecuador, and Colombia. The bootleg records were called piratas, and were printed in runs of less than 500 with bespoke covers, including logos for each sonidero.

Analog Africa head Samy Ben Redjeb travelled to Mexico City in 2019 to finalise the compilation album Saturno 2000. While there he came across the bootleg piratas, and on a later trip in 2022 he bought the records for Super Disco Pirata. Most of the tracks on the album are not the bootlegs that Redjeb found in Mexico, but instead versions recreated from the original tracks to be as close to the bootleg as possible. One exception is "Afro Oriental", of which Redjeb said "no matter how hard we tried, we never managed to make it sound as good."

== Critical reception ==
Professional ratings
Review scores
| Source | Rating |
|---|---|
| Jazzthetik | 3/5 stars |
| Mojo | 4/5 stars |
| Record Collector | 3/5 stars |
| Songlines | 4/5 stars |
| Uncut | 8/10 |

In a review for Uncut, Stephen Dalton described Super Disco Pirata as a "variable mix, but well stocked with pungent gems and alluringly wonky oddities." Songlines called the album "sometimes bizarre, but always glorious." Vogue México y Latinoamérica put the album 10th in their list of the best Spanish-language albums of 2024.

== Track listing ==
| No. | Title | Artist | Length |
|---|---|---|---|
| 1. | "Afro Oriental" | Lucho Burbano | 5:39 |
| 2. | "Cumbia de Los Bee Gees" | Cumbia Machuca | 2:40 |
| 3. | "El Tequilazo/Canelazo" | Lucho Gavilanes | 2:42 |
| 4. | "Palenque" | Carlos Haayen y su Piano Candeloso | 2:05 |
| 5. | "La Quinta Sinfonia de Beethoven" | Enrique Lynch | 3:01 |
| 6. | "Venus" | Los Pakines | 3:53 |
| 7. | "Lamento de Cumbia" | La Protesta de Colombia | 3:00 |
| 8. | "Ritmo de Cumbia" | Sonora Tropical | 3:14 |
| 9. | "La 3a de Los Toquecitos" | Eduardo Zurita | 3:23 |
| 10. | "La Noche" | León Cardona y Los Internacionales | 2:09 |
| 11. | "El Compae Nuñez" | El Combo Cienaguero | 2:14 |
| 12. | "La Luna y El Pescador" | Gabriel Meza y su Organo Chévere | 3:23 |
| 13. | "Tanto Tienes, Tanto Vales" | Los Destellos | 4:20 |
| 14. | "A Bailar El Son Satanico" | Los Diablos Rojos | 6:51 |
| 15. | "Cumbia Tropical" | Aníbal Ángel | 3:22 |
| 16. | "Hagan Rueda" | Angel María Camacho y Cano | 2:41 |
| 17. | "Eso Es Con Vela" | Orquesta "Rafalo" | 2:32 |
| 18. | "Cumbia Del Amor" | Alex Acosta y su Orquesta | 2:55 |
| 19. | "Malinga" | Ramón Ropaín | 3:30 |
| 20. | "Platico Chino" | Afrosound | 3:25 |
| 21. | "La China María" | Los Destellos | 3:05 |
| 22. | "Te Gusta Como Azucar" | Los Orientales de Paramonga | 2:40 |
| 23. | "Cumbia Candelosa" | Francisco Zapata | 2:53 |
| Total length: | | | 75:37 |

== Personnel ==
- Yacine Blaiech – graphic design
- Joaquín Contreras Soto – front cover
- Michael Graves – mastering
- Jordan McLeod – audio restoration
- Carlos Icaza, Samy Ben Redjeb – liner notes
- Jesse Simon – text editing
- Brendan James Flannery – translation
