= Roots Rocking Zimbabwe =

Roots Rocking Zimbabwe: The Modern Sound of Harare' Townships 1975–1980

Compilation album by Various Artists
- Released: 2 May 2025
- Length: 77:02
- Label: Analog Africa

Roots Rocking Zimbabwe: The Modern Sound of Harare' Townships 1975–1980 is a compilation album of Zimbabwean music fusing various local and international musical styles, made during the final years of the state of Rhodesia. It was released by Analog Africa on 2 May 2025.

== Background and release ==
The modern country of Zimbabwe was preceded from 1965 to 1979 by the state of Rhodesia, which was ruled by a white-minority government. At the start of the 1970s, British and American rock bands were often played on the radio stations of the Rhodesian Broadcasting Corporation, and black South African musicians came to the country to play to audiences that were unavailable to them under apartheid.

At the same time, Rhodesian bands were making music combining influences from British and American rock, Congolese rumba, Jamaican reggae, and South African Mbaqanga. In 1974 South African record label Teal expanded their Rhodesian business by creating the local imprints Afro Soul, Afro Pop, and Shungu, which released records by local bands. The success of this prompted South African label Gallo to do the same, and producer West Nkosi went to work for them in Harare. Radio France Internationale described the period as one of "transition, of a search for artistic identity, which logically reflected the aspirations of the majority to emancipate themselves from the colonial yoke."

Roots Rocking Zimbabwe was released by German record label Analog Africa on 2 May 2025 on LP, CD, and as a digital download. The physical release came with a booklet containing historical background, band profiles, and archival photographs. The Arts Desk wrote that "without the effort taken to provide this context Roots Rocking Zimbabwe would still be a great compilation. But with it, it becomes, in effect, a guide to how and why Zimbabwe's music evolved."

== Critical reception ==
Professional ratings
Review scores
Source	Rating
Clash	9/10
Jazzthetik	4/5 stars
Mojo	4/5 stars
Record Collector	4/5 stars
Songlines	4/5 stars
Uncut	8/10

Roots Rocking Zimbabwe received positive reviews from critics. Jim Irvin of Mojo described the album as "a splendid primer for a sound that deserves more attention", and Jason Anderson of Uncut wrote that "the songs bristle with an energy that connects with the wider struggle for national liberation happening outside the recording studio." In The Wire, Rosie Esther Solomon wrote that Roots Rocking Zimbabwe "bursts at the seams with creativity and experimentation". In November 2025, the album was nominated for a Grammy Award in the Best Historical Album category.

== Track listing ==
No.	Title	Artist	Length
1.	"Chiiko Chinotinetsa"	Thomas Mapfumo & The Acid Band	3:23
2.	"Amai A Kwatu"	New Tutenkhamen	2:46
3.	"Soweto Mujibha"	Gypsy Caravan	2:39
4.	"Soul Scene"	Echoes Ltd	2:54
5.	"Anoshereketa"	Oliver & The Black Spirits	2:52
6.	"Nyaya Dzinonetsa"	The Storm	3:16
7.	"Hangaiwa"	The Blacks Unlimited	3:04
8.	"The Towering Inferno"	The Green Arrows	2:15
9.	"Joburg Bound"	New Tutenkhamen	2:59
10.	"Nyamutamba Naziwere"	Mawonera Superstars	3:55
11.	"Engelina"	Echoes Ltd	3:13
12.	"Funky Reggae"	Witch	3:58
13.	"Introduction"	Baked Beans	3:08
14.	"Yarira"	Blacks Unlimited	2:53
15.	"Baby Please"	The Phaze	2:32
16.	"Chistiuiti"	Gypsy Caravan	2:45
17.	"Kwakaenda Imbwa"	Melody & Bybit	3:07
18.	"No Delay"	The Green Arrows	2:48
19.	"Kumalila Ngwenya"	New Tutenkhamen	2:51
20.	"Shanga Yangu"	Harare Mambo Band	3:15
21.	"Give It"	Shaft Form	2:37
22.	"Musikana"	Sweg Unity	3:14
23.	"Taj Mahal"	Double Shuffle	2:48
24.	"Viva Zimbabwe"	Dagger Rock Band	4:00
25.	"Porter"	I.T.C. Blues Limited	3:50
Total length:			77:02

== Personnel ==
- Mastering – Michael Graves
- Compilation producer - Samy Ben Redjeb
