= Saturno 2000: La Rebajada de Los Sonideros 1962-1983 =

Compilation album by Various artists
- Released: 15 April 2022
- Genre: cumbia rebajada
- Length: 57:57
- Label: Analog Africa

Saturno 2000: La Rebajada de Los Sonideros 1962-1983 is a compilation album of cumbia rebajada, released by Analog Africa on 15 April 2022.

== Background and release ==
The tracks on Saturno 2000 are cumbia rebajadas (rebajada is Spanish for reduced or lowered), which are slowed-down and pitch shifted versions of cumbia songs. The genre of cumbia rebajada emerged in Monterrey in the late 1970s, after the success of a cumbia set by DJ Gabriel Dueñez in which his turntables short-circuited, and began playing the records at slower speeds. Following this other DJs began modifying their turntables to play records at speeds as low as 20rpm.

Peruvian DJ Eamon Ore-Giron suggested a compilation of cumbia rebajada to Analog Africa head Samy Ben Redjeb in 2010, selected the tracks from across Latin America, and slowed them down himself. The original tracks are from Colombia, Ecuador, Peru, Mexico, and Venezuela, and are mostly instrumentals recorded in the 1970s. Saturno 2000 was released by Analog Africa on 15 April 2022 on CD and LP, and as a download.

== Critical reception ==
Professional ratings
Review scores
Source	Rating
AllMusic	4.5/5 stars
Buzz Magazine	5/5 stars
Clash	8/10
Songlines	4/5 stars
Sounds and Colours	4/5 stars
Uncut	4/5 stars

In a review for Uncut, John Lewis called the compilation "gleefully disconcerting stuff." Sam Walker-Smart of Clash said that "anyone with an existing interest in cumbia, reggae, or early synth scenes should find plenty to enjoy within this unique mixture of the three." The Arts Desk named "Capricho Egipcio" the stand-out track, and compared the slowed-down cumbias to Belgian popcorn and Finnish tango, two other musical sub-genres that are notable for being played slower than their parent genres. Sounds and Colours called the title track by Los Santos "a languid slice of mutant cumbia."

== Track listing ==
No.	Title	Writer(s)	Artist	Length
1.	"Sampuesana"	José Joaquín Bettin Martínez	Los Dinners	3:52
2.	"La Borrachita"	Polibio Mayorga	Junior y su Equipo	2:30
3.	"Paga La Cuenta Sinverguenza"	Manuel Samaniego, Berardo Hernández	Manzanita y su Conjunto	4:57
4.	"Infinito"	Hugo César Blanco Manzo	Hugo Blanco y su Arpa Viajera	3:34
5.	"El Jardinero"	Berardo Hernández	Manzanita y su Conjunto	3:56
6.	"Feito Parrandero"	Alcides Vicente Casas Rojas	Los Feos	3:40
7.	"Bien Bailadito"	Polibio Mayorga	Junior y su Equipo	4:14
8.	"Saturno 2000"	Secundo Alfonso Saavedra Lecca	Los Santos	3:42
9.	"La Danza Del Mono"	Maximiliano Chávez	Lucho Gavilanes	3:21
10.	"Capricho Egipcio"	Jorge Contreras	Conjunto Típico Contreras	3:28
11.	"El Chacarero"	Manuel Vásquez, Marino Valencia	Los Gatos Blancos	3:22
12.	"Pa' Oriente Me Voy"	Alejandro Villanueva	Los Atomos de Paramonga	4:25
13.	"Alegrate"	Polibio Mayorga	Junior y su Equipo	3:00
14.	"Todo Lo Tengo De Ti Menos Tu Amor"	Victor Casahuaman Bendezu	Grupo Celeste	4:47
15.	"La Fuga Del Bandido"	Edilberto Cuestas Chacón	Los Ecos	5:01
Total length:				57:57

== Personnel ==
- Research and interviews – Jorge G. Balleza, Oscar G. Balleza, Brendan James Flannery, Yoana Berenice Herrera Orrala
- Pictures and posters – Yoana Berenice Herrera Orrala, David Rincon, Jorge G. Balleza, Oscar G. Balleza
- Graphic design – Yacine Blaiech, Kathrin Remest
- Mastering – Michael Graves
- Lacquers – Frank Merritt
- Text editing – Ian Preece
