= The Garden Spot Programs, 1950 =

Compilation album CD, LP by Hank Williams
- Released: May 20, 2014
- Recorded: February 1950
- Genre: Country
- Length: 45:42
- Label: Omnivore
- Producers: Colin Escott, Cheryl Pawelski

The Garden Spot Programs, 1950 is a compilation of four fifteen-minute radio shows recorded by country music singer Hank Williams for Naughton Farms in February 1950.

After discs containing four shows were found in 2013 by music archivist George Gimarc, the 24 tracks were remastered and released by Omnivore Recordings. The release won a Grammy Award for Best Historical Album.

== Content ==
In February 1950, Hank Williams recorded a series of fifteen-minute radio shows, commissioned by Naughton Farms, a plant nursery out of Waxahachie, Texas. Instead of the Drifting Cowboys, Williams was backed by a band assembled for the job. The sixteen-inch transcription discs were sent to radio stations across the United States to be broadcast along with commercials for the nursery.

In 2013, recordings of four of the shows were found by record collector George Gimarc which originally came from KSIB-AM in Creston, Iowa. Gimarc notified Williams biographer Colin Escott and together they contacted Cheryl Pawelski, founder of the reissue label Omnivore Recordings. Escott and Pawelski met with William's daughter, Jett Williams, who cleared the release. For the re-master and restoration of the tracks, Omnivore hired audio engineer Michael Graves.

== Release and reception ==
Professional ratings
Review scores
| Source | Rating |
|---|---|
| AllMusic | 4/5 stars |
| PopMatters | 8/10 stars |

The 24-track album was released by Omnivore on May 20, 2014, on CD and digital LP. The liner notes of the album were written by Escott, while the packaging included pictures from the author's personal collection. The release won Best Historical Album during the 57th Grammy Awards.

Allmusic rated the release with four stars out of five. The reviewer noted that while the band that backed Williams did not complement him as did his usual band, the singer "sounds strong and inspired". PopMatters rated it with eight points out of ten, qualifying the performances as "more than polished and heartfelt ... downright chilling."

== Track listing ==
| No. | Title | Length |
|---|---|---|
| 1. | "The Garden Spot Jingle" | 0:30 |
| 2. | "Lovesick Blues" | 3:15 |
| 3. | "A Mansion on the Hill" | 2:46 |
| 4. | "Fiddle Tune" | 0:52 |
| 5. | "I've Just Told Mama Goodbye" | 2:35 |
| 6. | "Closing/Oh! Susanna" | 0:53 |
| 7. | "The Garden Spot Jingle" | 0:29 |
| 8. | "Mind Your Own Business" | 2:32 |
| 9. | "Lovesick Blues" | 2:52 |
| 10. | "Fiddle Tune" | 0:34 |
| 11. | "At The First Fall of Snow" | 3:25 |
| 12. | "Closing/Oh! Susanna" | 0:57 |
| 13. | "The Garden Spot Jingle" | 0:29 |
| 14. | "I Can't Get You Off of My Mind" | 2:41 |
| 15. | "I Don't Care (If Tomorrow Never Comes)" | 2:28 |
| 16. | "Fiddle Tune" | 0:35 |
| 17. | "Farther Along" | 2:53 |
| 18. | "Closing/Oh! Susanna" | 1:18 |
| 19. | "The Garden Spot Jingle" | 0:29 |
| 20. | "I'll Be a Bachelor 'Til I Die" | 2:22 |
| 21. | "Wedding Bells" | 3:36 |
| 22. | "Fiddle Tune" | 0:28 |
| 23. | "Jesus Remembered Me" | 2:32 |
| 24. | "Closing/Oh! Susanna" | 4:11 |

== Chart performance ==
| Chart (2014) | Position |
|---|---|
| US Top Country Albums (Billboard) | 43 |
