= Angola Soundtrack =

Compilation album series

Angola Soundtrack is a two-volume compilation album series released by German record label Analog Africa. The albums compile music recorded between 1968 and 1978 in Angola, a period bridging the second half of the Angolan War of Independence and the beginnings of the Angolan Civil War, and which roughly coincides with the "golden age" of Angolan music. The first volume (2010) is focused on Angolan popular music of the 1960s and 70s, which drew from traditional styles including rebita, kazukuta, and semba, as well as Latin and Congolese influences. The second volume (2013) compiles more experimental music from the same period.

== Background ==
In 1968, Angola was a colony of Portugal. Guerrilla groups had been fighting the Angolan War of Independence (one part of the Portuguese Colonial War) since 1961, and the war lasted until 1974. Under Portuguese rule, Angolan bands were banned from performing at carnivals, but a parallel live scene developed.

In November 1975 Angola declared its independence. Immediately after independence the Angolan Civil War began, which was to last 27 years. The war created dangerous conditions for musicians; David Zé and Urbano de Castro, who feature on Angola Soundtrack, were murdered in 1977 as part of the backlash to a failed coup attempt.

Angolan music has been influenced by its colonial history, and bears similarities to the music of Portugal, Brazil, Cape Verde, and Mozambique. The strong musical culture of Angola's neighbour Zaïre also influenced its music, in particular in the use of complex guitar rhythms similar to those of Congolese rumba. In the 1960s the bass guitar was rarely used in Angolan music, and songs were driven by the lead guitar rhythm. Latin music, particularly Cuban, also influenced Angolan music post-independence.

== Volume 1 – The Unique Sound Of Luanda 1968–1976 ==
Angola Soundtrack – The Unique Sound Of Luanda 1968–1976

Compilation album by Various Artists
- Released: 22 November 2010
- Recorded: 1968–1976
- Length: 76:26
- Label: Analog Africa

The first volume of Angola Soundtrack was inspired by a series of albums released by French record label Buda Musique in 1999–2000 that compiled Angolan music from the 1960s and 70s, and features some of the same artists. Analog Africa owner Samy Ben Redjeb spent several years collecting Angolan records, and chose the tracklist from a pool of hundreds. Angola Soundtrack was released on CD and LP on 22 November 2010.

=== Critical reception ===
Professional ratings
Review scores
Source	Rating
AllMusic	4/5 stars
The Guardian	4/5 stars
PopMatters	8/10
Songlines	5/5 stars
The Telegraph	4/5 stars

Janne Oinonen of The Line of Best Fit called the first volume of Angola Soundtrack "essential listening...proving once again that behind the simplistic media portrayal of Africa as a continent of war, misery and poverty lies much richer, vibrant and multi-faceted reality," and identified Os Bongos' tracks as a highlight. In The Wire, Julian Cowley described the album as having "no monumental standout tracks, but music with momentum and direction that carries you with it." PopMatters wrote "one of the best things I can say about Angola Soundtrack is that it lives up to the rest of the Analog Africa discography."

=== Track listing ===
No.	Title	Artist	Length
1.	"Rei do Palhetinho"	Mamukueno	3:09
2.	"Comboio"	Os Kiezos	3:34
3.	"Ilha Virgem"	Jovens do Prenda	3:45
4.	"Ulungu Wami"	Zé Da Lua	2:51
5.	"Pachanga Maria"	Os Bongos	3:20
6.	"Tira Sapato"	Dimba Diangola	2:56
7.	"N'Gui Banza Mama"	Santos Júnior	4:27
8.	"Mi Cantando Para Ti"	N'Goma Jazz	3:36
9.	"Macongo Me Chiquita"	Ferreira do Nascimento	3:51
10.	"Uma Amiga"	David Zé	2:40
11.	"Farra Na Madrugada"	Jovens do Prenda	4:44
12.	"Sémba Braguez"	Os Korimbas	4:21
13.	"Fuma"	Dimba Diangola	4:09
14.	"Passeio por Luanda"	Alliace Makiadi	3:53
15.	"Kazucuta"	Os Bongos	3:21
16.	"Eme Lelu"	Quim Manuel O Espirito Santo	5:06
17.	"Pica O Dedo"	Africa Ritmos	4:02
18.	"Massanga Mama"	Africa Show	12:41
Total length:			76:26

=== Personnel ===
- Mastering – Nick Robbins
- Graphic design – Dirk Von Manteuffel, Petra Shröder
- Interview translation – Dora Mendes
- Text editing – Vikram Sohonie
- Additional writing – Marissa Moorman
- Compiled by Samy Ben Redjeb

== Volume 2 – Hypnosis, Distortions & Other Sonic Innovations 1969–1978 ==
Angola Soundtrack 2 – Hypnosis, Distortions & Other Sonic Innovations 1969–1978

Compilation album by Various Artists
- Released: 2 December 2013
- Recorded: 1969–1978
- Length: 76:36
- Label: Analog Africa

The second volume of Angola Soundtrack is again focused on guitar-driven popular music, but with a more experimental sound. It was released on 2 December 2013.

=== Critical reception ===
Professional ratings
Review scores
Source	Rating
Record Collector	4/5 stars
Songlines	4/5 stars

An article in the Yearbook for Traditional Music described Angola Soundtrack 2 as "a glorious example of minor, mid-tempo guitar workouts that are as danceable as they are melancholic." Record Collector said "that such a wealth of musical riches should have been produced at a time of such instability is nothing short of miraculous."

=== Track listing ===
No.	Title	Artist	Length
1.	"Avante Juventude"	Os Anjos	3:34
2.	"Senhor Doutor"	Quim Manuel O Espirito Santo	3:37
3.	"N'Hoca"	Tony Von	2:57
4.	"Kia Lomingo"	Urbano de Castro	3:34
5.	"Bina"	Jovens do Prenda	4:16
6.	"Mabelé"	Oscar Neves	2:28
7.	"Agarrem"	Africa Ritmo	3:05
8.	"Saudades de Luanda"	Os Kiezos	2:44
9.	"Bongololo"	Kito	3:24
10.	"N'Ga Kunu M'Butu"	Muhongo	2:35
11.	"Lemba"	Negoleiros do Ritmo	3:28
12.	"Snipes"	Dicanzas do Prenda	4:08
13.	"Bazooka"	Carlo Lamartine & Águias Reais	3:28
14.	"Divua Diami"	Cisco	3:21
15.	"Meca"	Levis Vercky's	5:06
16.	"Chamavo"	Elias Diá Kimuezo	3:33
17.	"Olha O Pica"	Africa Ritmo	3:26
18.	"Fatimita"	Urbano de Castro	4:02
19.	"Inspiraçáo de Nito"	Africa Show 73	3:30
20.	"Despedida"	Dimba Diangola	6:19
21.	"Fuguei Na Escola (Para Jogar A Bola)"	Teta Lando	4:01
Total length:			76:36

=== Personnel ===
- Mastering – Michael Graves
- Graphic design – Frederic Thiphagne
- Front and back cover – Dirk Von Manteufel
- Text editing – Jimmy "Trash" Alexander and Vikram Sohonie
- Vinyl record cutting – Maarten de Boer
- Text translation – Tassia Fernandes, Liticia Brito, and Maria Beatriz Machado
- Additional translation – Pierre Pereira
- Additional interviews and research – Analtino Santos
- Additional information – Marissa Moorman
- Compiled by Samy Ben Redjeb
