= Museum of Devotion =

American electro-industrial band

- Origin: Ann Arbor, Michigan, United States
- Genres: electro-industrial, coldwave, industrial rock
- Years active: 1986–1991; 2012–present
- Labels: Lively Arts; New Rose Records
- Members: Robert Anderson; James Cooper
- Past members: Peter Cooper; Christi
- Website: museumofdevotion.com Official Website

Museum of Devotion are an American electro-industrial band formed in Ann Arbor, Michigan, United States of America in 1986 featuring James Cooper on vocals, guitar, keyboards and Robert Anderson on lead guitar, bass guitar and keyboards.

== History ==
Museum of Devotion went through various personnel changes including James Cooper: vocals, guitar, keyboards, drum machine; Robert Anderson: guitar, bass guitar, keyboards and programming; Peter Cooper: bass guitar; and Christi: vocals and percussion; before settling into their present composition. When Museum of Devotion ventured into the studio to produce tracks in 1988 it became a James Cooper and Robert Anderson duo. The first Museum of Devotion album was released in 1988. The "…to the Pink Period" sessions were recorded at Old School House Studios in Ann Arbor, Michigan, under the record label Lively Arts, New Rose Records out of Paris, France. The album received critical acclaim and positioned the band into Coldwave genre as being electro-industrial along with other bands such as This Mortal Coil, The Sisters of Mercy, Joy Division, and Asylum Party to mention a few.

Museum of Devotion followed up in 1989 with their "Racist" EP which featured a more electronic spin to their style, including an aggressive cover of "Groove Line" by the funk group Heatwave (band). In 1990, Museum of Devotion pressed "Wants Verses Needs" which featured a Belgium top ten dance track "Sunshine". On this album the band paid tribute to the United Kingdom power house Squeeze (band) by doing a dark version of Take Me I'm Yours. In 1991 an obscure Los Angeles DJ mix emerged with the "Sunshine" singles.

The principal line up to the band remains the same, although they have gone into a career hiatus before emerging in 2012 with new material and the same Coldwave attitude. Despite the band’s absence from the scene, their relevance remains, as seen by tracks such as "Canary in a Cathouse" and "Devotion" continuing to be on regular spin rotation by DJ’s across Europe and the United States in the gothic rock and Darkwave scenes.

In January 2014, Museum of Devotion released a music video for their 1990 single, Slomo on YouTube. The footage was shot in 1990 in preparation for the music video, but their record label, Lively Arts, and its parent, New Rose Records, folded before the video was completed. The band recovered the footage and released it on YouTube, 24 years after the project was started.

In February 2014, Museum of Devotion released the "Another Cold Wave" EP which is a return to their darkwave roots. Along with the release of the new EP, Museum of Devotion reissued and remastered their first two albums, "...to the Pink Period" and "Wants Versus Needs".

== Members ==
=== Current ===
- Robert Anderson - guitar, bass guitar, keyboards and programming
- James Cooper - vocals, guitar, keyboards, drum machine

=== Former ===
- Peter Cooper
- Christi

== Discography ==
- ...To The Pink Period (1988)
- Racist (EP) (1989)
- Wants Versus Needs (1990)
- Another Cold Wave (EP) (2014)
