= Kolombia (subculture) =

Mexican subculture

Kolombia or Cholombiano was an urban subculture that emerged in Mexico, specifically in Monterrey, Nuevo León. It had its peak in the 2000s, and was characterized by its peculiar outfits that marked the lifestyle lived in the most disadvantaged neighborhoods of the entity, as well as the predilection for cumbia music and vallenato. The name of this subculture derives from the strong Colombian immigration to the State of Nuevo León since the end of the 20th century.

== History ==
In the second half of the 20th century, Monterrey experienced a wave of immigration by Colombians, most of them fleeing the insecurity that plagued their country due to drug trafficking. This fact, as well as the importation of records from Mexico City of different musical genres from Colombia (such as cumbia, vallenato and porro) became famous among the popular classes in several cities of Nuevo León. This fame would occur through public dances and parties, giving rise to this subculture in places such as Colonia Independencia, popularly known as "La Indepe".

One of the unifying elements of this subculture — in addition to the taste for Colombian authors — is the so-called cumbia rebajada (literally "lowered cumbia"), an accidental manipulation of vallenato and Colombian cumbia. According to Gabriel Duéñez, sonidero for four decades and collector of Colombian music from Monterrey, this subgenre of cumbia originated accidentally when, in his Sonido Duéñez, the bpm control of the music player broke down and it began playing music at a slower speed, resulting in a rhythm that he calls "lower, more watery."

In the 80s, in many cities in Mexico, social groups grew that adopted, through transculturation or the deportation of some members of them in the United States —among them, Sureños— the cholo life style: the organizational forms, the codes of language, symbolism and mainly the way of dressing of the neighborhood gangs.

== The Cholombiano boom ==
Derived from both influences, at the end of the 90s, the subculture called Kolombia or Cholombiano—derived from cholo and Colombian— was born in the area of the popular neighborhoods of Loma Larga in Monterrey, a hybridization, in the words of Néstor García Canclini. Said expression had as an element of socialization the listening and dancing of Colombian music, which at that time was produced both by groups originating from Nuevo León and by Mexican and Colombian production spread by public reproduction of such topics. Music became available by purchase, copying of cassettes, compact discs, and eventually digital files in places such as the Puente del Papa and Reforma Street, and its reproduction with portable devices such as recorders and portable speakers in the houses and corners of people. neighborhoods. In these sites, through, among others, the aforementioned Sonido Duéñez, news and compilations of classic authors from the vallenato as well as reduced versions of the hits of the moment were obtained. The boom of the Cholombiano subculture was such that it spread throughout the country.

== Decline ==
Although the vast majority of the members of these groups had a pacifist tendency, with the advent of the War against drug trafficking, the discrimination, homophobia and classism experienced in Nuevo León as well as the reduction of said culture to gang members or criminals which had already existed since the 70s, led to these groups (mostly composed of young people) being stigmatized and singled out with greater intensity by the educational authorities and the police of various orders in different cities of the State, being continually relegated as well as violated, arbitrarily detained and imprisoned for the simple reason of following this fashion. Therefore, the phenomenon would begin to gradually disappear either because the police arbitrarily detained them when they identified them on the street by their hairstyle and cut them off or because of fear of being associated with gang members who are members of criminal groups.

== Style and clothing ==
One of the most notable characteristics of the Kolombia subculture was its outfits; many of them manufactured by the same members. In the case of shaved hair but with the growth of large sideburns molded with a lot of hair fixative (patilludo). This style is cited as "a mix of American hip hop, Puerto Rican reggaeton and old Aztec representations." This would include the use of flowered shirts and Hawaiian patterns popularized by Celso Piña and as a representation of the tropical, loose clothing (tumbadilla as they say in Monterrey) such as Dickies brand pants, shirts and shorts, white t-shirts, Converse or Nike tennis shoes, as well as the vindication of the Virgin of Guadalupe and San Judas Tadeo and the carrying of elements associated with Colombia, like its flag.

According to Torres Escalante, the synthesis went further:

The flowered fringe of the brothers and the rockers, the metallic shirts of the metallics, the chola clothing of the cholos of Los Angeles, the cap of the rappers, the checked shirt of the Chicanos, the plucked eyebrows of the bachata singers, many times as a defense or concealment mechanism but the vast majority of the time because it is only what they can access in the market.

== Popular culture ==
- The 2019 film I'm No Longer Here (Ya no estoy aquí, in Spanish), directed by Fernando Frías de la Parra, addresses the Kolombia subculture and how certain fashions of it faded after the increase in insecurity in the northern region of Mexico.
