= Diablos del Ritmo =

Diablos del Ritmo: The Colombian Melting Pot 1960–1985

Compilation album by Various artists
- Released: 12 November 2012
- Length: 121:44
- Label: Analog Africa

Analog Africa chronology
The Bariba Sound 1970–1976 (2012)	Diablos del Ritmo: The Colombian Melting Pot 1960–1985 (2012)	The Skeletal Essences of Afro Funk 1969–1980 (2013)

Diablos del Ritmo (subtitled The Colombian Melting Pot 1960–1985) is a compilation album of music from the Colombian Caribbean. It was released by Analog Africa in November 2012.

== Background and release ==
The Colombian Caribbean has a large Afro-Colombian population, and the music of the region has been significantly influenced by African music. Analog Africa boss Samy Ben Redjeb collected the tracks on Diablos del Ritmo during a trip to Barranquilla. Analog Africa released the album on 12 November 2012. In the liner notes, Redjeb described the album as being "meant to showcase the astonishing musical diversity that exists in Colombia as well as to present the musical fusion that was happening in that country."

== Critical reception ==
Professional ratings
Review scores
Source	Rating
Christgau's Consumer Guide	A−
God Is in the TV	4/5 stars
Songlines	4/5 stars

In a review for Songlines, Chris Moss praised the "supremely talented brass and percussion players" and wrote that "for non-musicologists a lot of Diablos... will sound like moody proto-cumbia". Julian Cowley of The Wire described the opening track "El Caterete" as "a meaty Latin party cut steeped in African marinade". BBC Music said that "the quality is supreme throughout, with every track destined to fill a dancefloor with abandoned gyrations."

== Track listing ==
No.	Title	Writer(s)	Artist	Length
1.	"El Caterete"	Ramón Veloz	Wganda Kenya	4:15
2.	"Enyere Kumbara"	Julián Angulo	Julián y su Combo	3:38
3.	"Amampondo"	Miriam Makeba	Myrian Makenwa	3:04
4.	"Wasamayé"	Cástulo Boiga	Wasamayé Rock Group	2:37
5.	"Schallcarri"	Abelardo Carbonó	Grupo Abharca	3:16
6.	"Bajo el Trupillo Guajiro"	Policarpo Castillo	Sexteto Manaure	2:45
7.	"Pégale a la Nalga"	D.A.R. (Note: Standing for Derecho de Autor Reservado, meaning "copyright reserved"; used to indicate that the author is either unknown or intentionally anonymous.)	Fuentes All Stars	3:31
8.	"Juipiti"	Rafael Machuca	Grupo Folclórico	2:25
9.	"Shakalaodé"	Ramón Veloz	Wganda Kenya	7:34
10.	"Amor Salvaje"		Los Salvajes	2:55
11.	"Lumbalú"	Isaac Villanueva	Calixto Ochoa y los Papaupas	3:32
12.	"Quiero a Mi Gente"	Abelardo Carbonó	Abelardo Carbonó	3:44
13.	"Cumbia San Pablera"	Victor Valdez	Conjunto Son San	3:37
14.	"Calambre"		Conjunto Barbacoa	4:35
15.	"Busque el Gato" (hidden track)	D.A.R.	Harold y su Banda	3:37
16.	"Eco en Stereo"	Antonio Fuentes	Sonora Dinamita	2:47
17.	"La Veterana"	Emiro Torres	Peyo Torres y sus Diablos del Ritmo	2:43
18.	"Lluvia"	Efraín Rivera	Sonora Tropical	2:27
19.	"La Cascada"	D. en D.	Pianonegro	2:33
20.	"Busca la Careta"	Andrés Landero	Andrés Landero	2:52
21.	"La Pava Congona"	Andrés Landero	Andrés Landero	3:11
22.	"Cumbia Costeña"	Alejo Durán	Alejandro Durán	2:52
23.	"Agoniza el Magdalena"	Roque Saballeth	Ramiro Beltrán	5:13
24.	"Santana en Salsa"	José María Montes	Crescencio Camacho	6:12
25.	"La Motilona"	Ramón Vargas	Los Alegres Diablos	2:40
26.	"El Garabato"	Emiliano Vengoechea; Efraín Mejía	Cumbia Soledeña	2:48
27.	"Cumbia Sincelejana"	Jaime Alvear	J. Alvear	2:56
28.	"La Nena"	Alfonso Piña	Juan Piña y sus Muchachos	2:58
29.	"Sabrosón"	Roberto de la Barrerra	Roberto de la Barrerra y su Piano	3:19
30.	"La Bulla"	Crescencio Salcedo	Los Curramberos de Guayabal	2:43
31.	"La Pegajosa"	César Castro	Conjunto Típico del Valledupar	2:39
32.	"Fantasías del Carnaval"	Amado Barrios	Carmelo Gutiérrez	2:32
33.	"Pájaro Madrugador"	Danuil Montes	Alfredo Gutiérrez y sus Estrellas	2:57
34.	"La Guagua" (hidden track)	Emiro Caicedo	Los Alegres del Valle	2:52
Total length:				121:44

== Personnel ==
- Mastering – Michael Graves
