= Congo Funk! =

Congo Funk! Sound Madness from the Shores of the Mighty Congo River (Kinshasa/Brazzaville 1969–1982)

Compilation album by Various Artists
- Released: 5 April 2024
- Genre: Congolese rumba
- Length: 77:49
- Label: Analog Africa

Congo Funk! Sound Madness from the Shores of the Mighty Congo River (Kinshasa/Brazzaville 1969–1982) is a compilation album of Congolese rumba, released by record label Analog Africa on 5 April 2024.

== Background and release ==
In the 1940s and 1950s the influence of Cuban son music in the Republic of Congo (then a part of French Equatorial Africa) and the DRC (then the Belgian Congo) led to the development of a musical style called Congolese rumba. Thom Jurek of AllMusic writes that "the Afro-Cuban sound established new parameters for performance with reverbed guitars, distorted electric basslines, horn sections, jazz-inflected psychedelia, and funk."

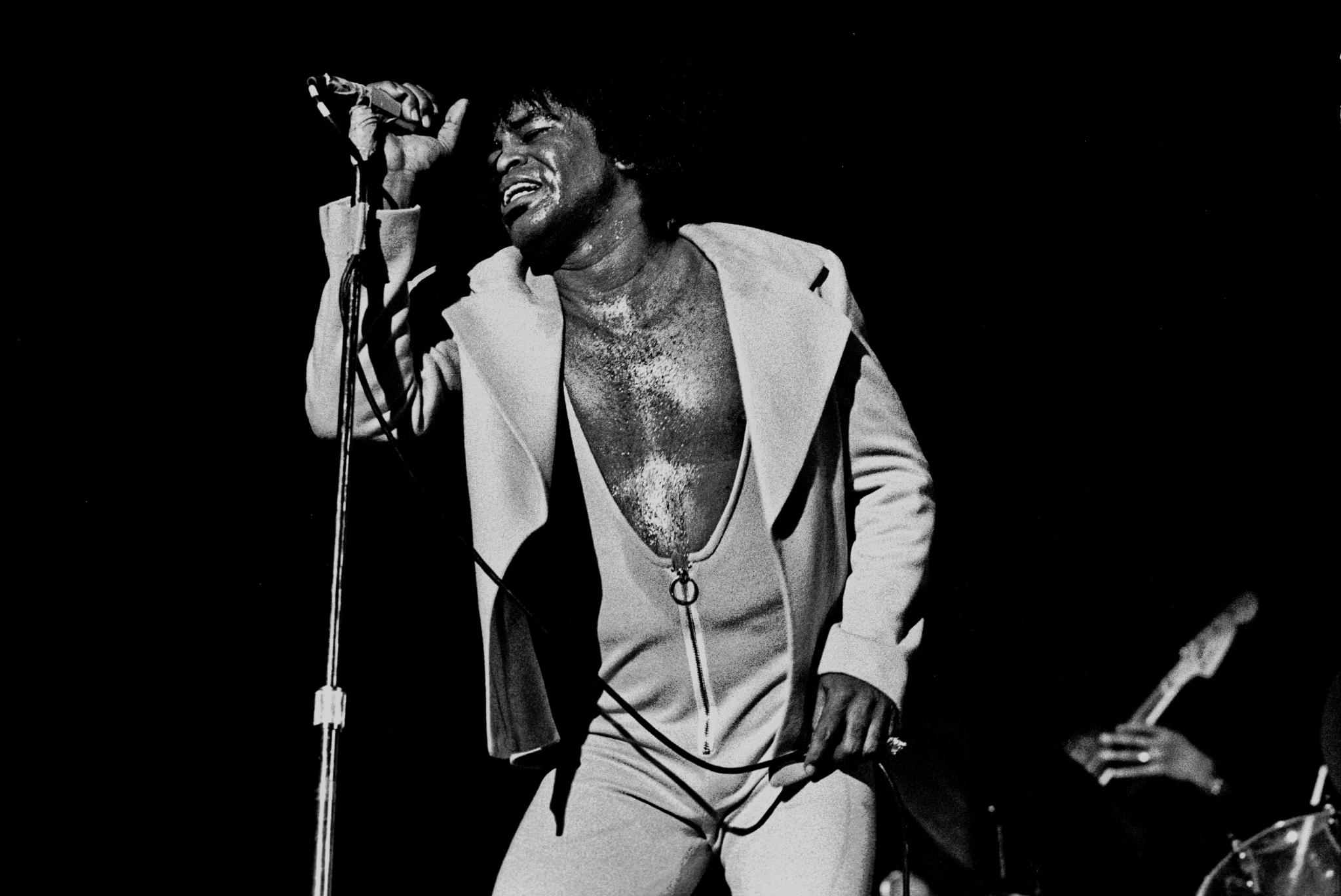
James Brown in 1973. Brown's performance at Zaire 74 was influential on Congolese music.

In the 1960s Congolese rumba grew in popularity across southern Africa. In the 1970s the music scene in the DRC (then Zaire) declined as many musicians left to escape the difficult economic situation. The presence of James Brown at the three-day music festival Zaire 74, which preceded the 1974 Rumble in the Jungle boxing match between George Foreman and Muhammad Ali, had an electrifying effect on the music scenes in Brazzaville and Kinshasa.

Samy Ben Redjeb, owner of record label Analog Africa, selected the tracks on Congo Funk! from a pool of around 2,000 that he collected on trips to Kinshasa and Brazzaville. Analog Africa had previously released a compilation of 1960s and 70s tracks by Congolese group Verckys et l’Orchestre Vévé, which included Congolese rumba alongside funk and afrobeat.

== Critical reception ==
Professional ratings
Aggregate scores
Source	Rating
Metacritic	89/100
Review scores
Source	Rating
AllMusic	4.5/5 stars
Clash	8/10
Jazzthetik	4/5 stars
Mojo	4/5 stars
Musikexpress	5/6 stars
The Observer	4/5 stars
Record Collector	4/5 stars
Songlines	4/5 stars
Uncut	9/10

On review aggregator Metacritic the album holds a score of 89/100, based on 6 reviews, indicating "universal acclaim". Thom Jurek of AllMusic praised the compilation, rating it 4.5/5 stars and calling it "an indispensable addition not only to the Analog Africa catalog but to the burgeoning cultural conversation around the significance, import, and variety of techniques, innovations, aesthetics, and attitudes in African music-making from the era."

Andy Cowan of Mojo rated Congo Funk! 4/5 stars, writing that "global groovers will find this seamless mix of the known and the obscure frequently revelatory." Writing in the Observer, Neil Spencer described the album as "precisely played and delightfully sung examples of Congolese rumba", and rated it 4/5 stars. Clash rated the album 8/10 and called it "a fascinating time capsule into not only the artists and studios of the time but the cities themselves and the Congolese spirit as a whole." In the June 2024 issue of Songlines magazine, Nik Hann praised the balance of energetic and laid-back tracks, and called the album "a tour de force of ineffably enticing grooves."

== Track listing ==
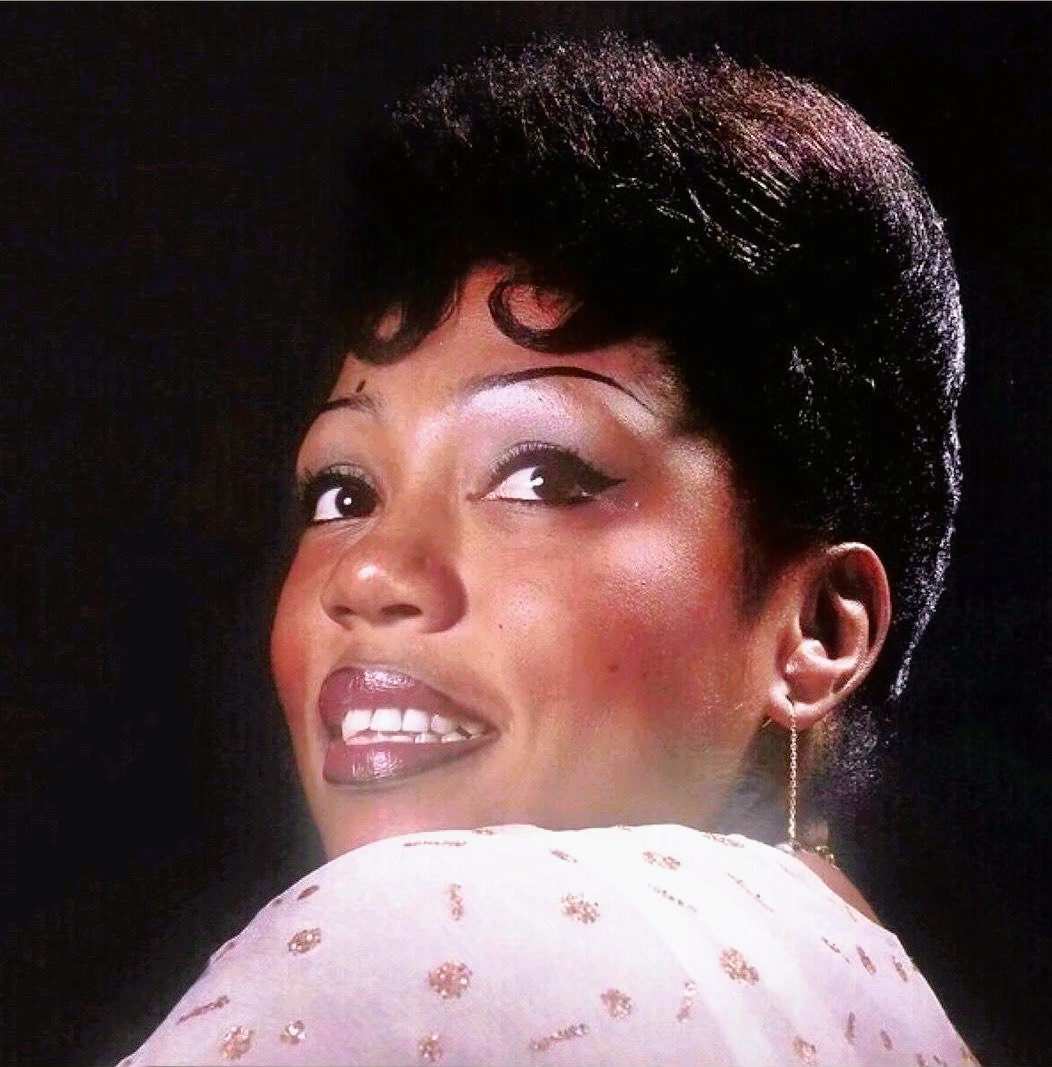
Abeti Masikini features on the compilation, as does her brother Abumba.

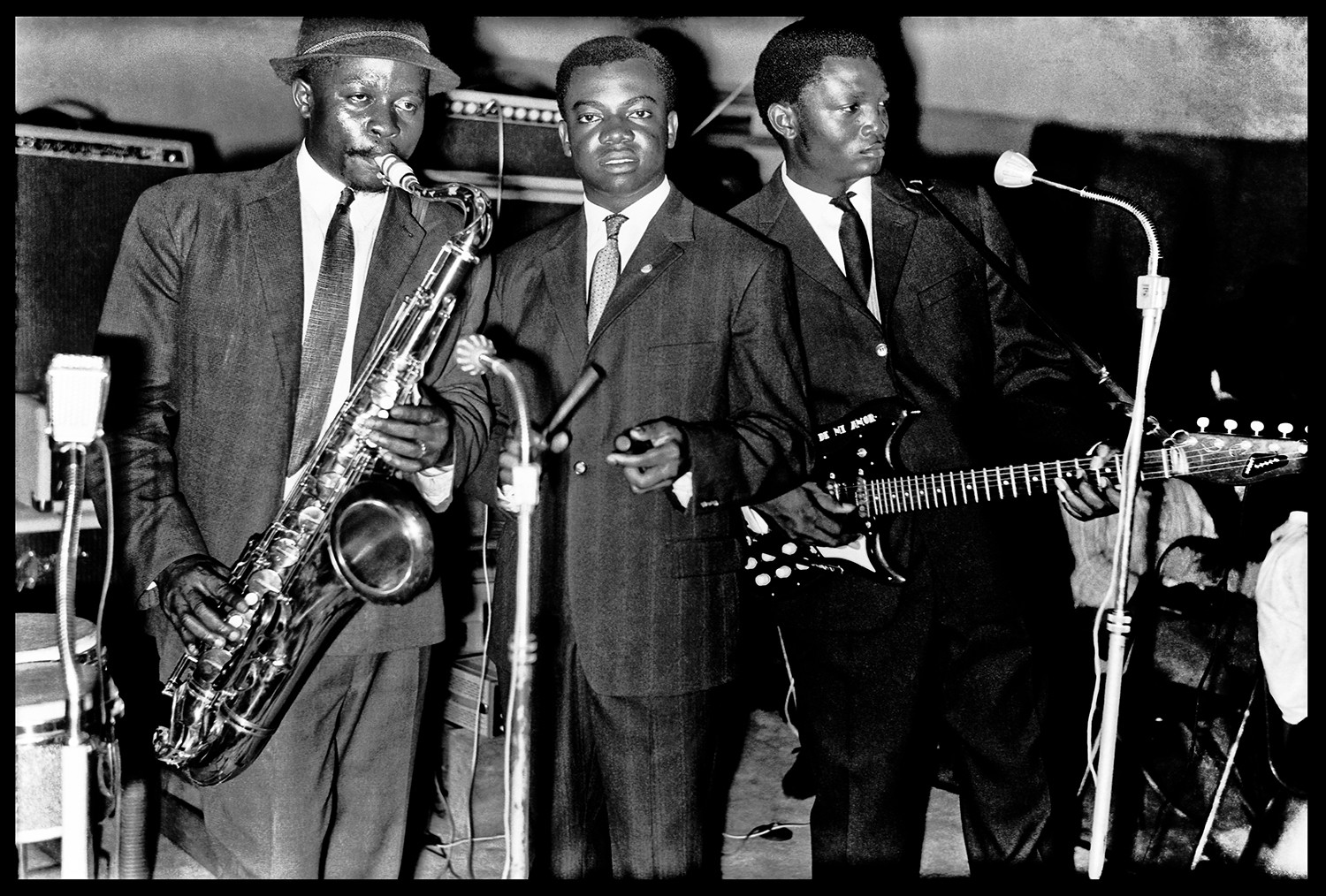
Isaac Musekiwa, Joseph Mulama and Franco Luambo of O.K. Jazz in 1963.

Congo Funk! track listing
No.	Title	Artist	Length
1.	"Sungu Lubuka"	Petelo Vicka et Son Nzazi	7:50
2.	"Mfuur Ma"	Groupe Minzoto Ya Zaïre	5:00
3.	"M.B.T's Sound"	M.B.T's	3:50
4.	"Musique Tshiluba"	Abeti et Les Redoutables	3:15
5.	"Lalia"	Trio Bydoli	5:00
6.	"Adeito"	Tabu Ley et L'Orchestre Afrisa	6:45
7.	"Ngantsie Soul"	Les Bantous de La Capitale	8:30
8.	"Nganga"	Les Frères Soki Et L'Orchestre Bella-Bella	8:40
9.	"Tembe Na Tembe Ya Nini"	Orchestre Celi Bitshou	7:20
10.	"Lolo Soulfire"	Lolo et L'Orchestre O.K. Jazz	3:35
11.	"Femme Ne Pleure Pas"	Zaiko Langa Langa	6:00
12.	"Kiwita Kumunani"	Orchestre O.K. Jazz	3:50
13.	"Fiancée Laya"	G.O. Malebo	5:05
14.	"Ah! Congo"	Orchestre National Du Congo	3:20
Total length:			77:49

== Personnel ==
- Yacine Blaiech (Mogli Studio) – graphic design
- Santiago Pozzi aka "Santi" – gatefold cover design
- Michael Graves (Osiris Studio) – mastering
- Jesse Simon – text editing
- Volkan Kaya and Samy Ben Redjeb – liner notes
- Volkan Kaya – interviews and translation
