= Dust-to-Digital =

American record label

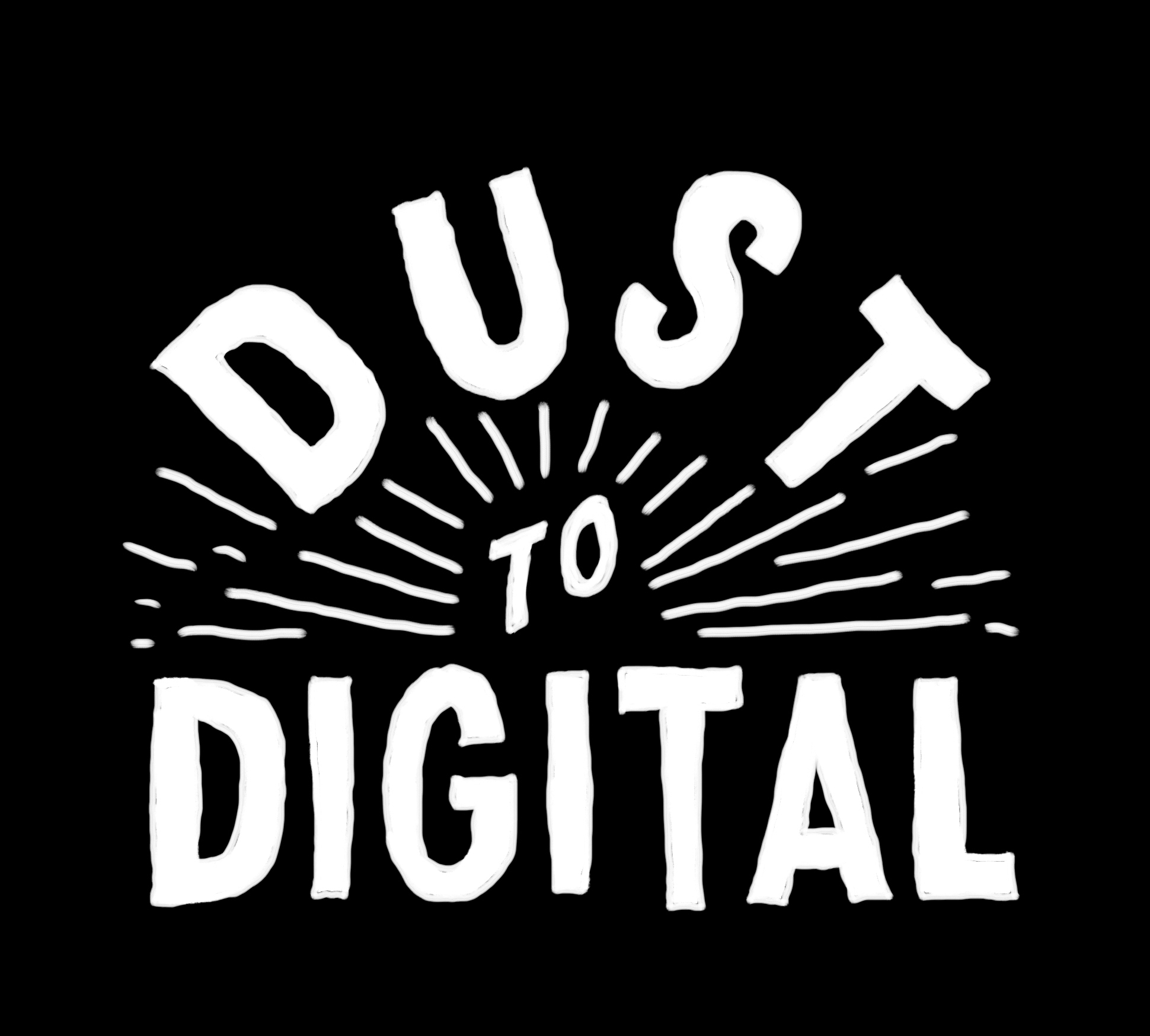
- Founded: 1999
- Founder: Lance Ledbetter, April Ledbetter
- Genre: Blues, country, folk, gospel, jazz, and world music
- Country of origin: U.S.
- Location: Atlanta, Georgia
- Official website: www.dust-digital.com

Dust-to-Digital started as a record company that specialized in documenting the history of American popular music, including historical recordings of blues, gospel, and country music. They have since expanded their catalogue to include a breadth of international music, and their full discography has over 70 releases from all over the world. Their method combines rare recordings with historic images, photographs, and detailed texts describing artists and their works. The company has won multiple Grammy Awards.

== History ==
In February 1999, while working at WRAS, an Atlanta college radio station, and becoming frustrated at the unavailability of gospel music recordings from the 78 rpm era, Lance Ledbetter set out on a search for rare recordings of gospel music. Aiding in his search was his then-girlfriend, April, who has continued to work with Lance ever since. The culmination of five years of research, Goodbye, Babylon was released in 2003 on Ledbetter's newly formed label, Dust-to-Digital. The six-CD box set, containing gospel music from 1902 to 1960, accompanied by a 200-page book, was well received. Known for their deluxe packaging and in-depth research, Dust-to-Digital quickly established itself as the gold-standard for archival releases.

Since 2004, Dust-to-Digital has issued more than 70 titles. Their 2007 release Art of Field Recording Volume 1: Fifty Years of Traditional American Music Documented by Art Rosenbaum, a collection of recordings by folklorist and artist Art Rosenbaum, won a Grammy for Best Historical Album. In 2012, Lance and April launched their nonprofit the Dust-to-Digital Foundation, an organization dedicated to the preservation of recorded music of all types & genres.

In May 2017, Dust-to-Digital began posting Instagram videos of music performances of all kinds, from rare historical television footage to people making music out of everyday objects. The label's account has since garnered over a million followers, and Dust-to-Digital has become known as a hub for footage of engaging musical performances on social media.

Their box-set Voices of Mississippi: Artists and Musicians Documented by William Ferris won two Grammy Awards in 2019 for Best Historical Album and Best Liner Notes. Based on the award-winning set, the Voices of Mississippi Live Tour began in 2022, and the program features live musical performances by blues and gospel musicians integrated with film, audio recordings, and rare photographs.

== Releases ==
List of Dust-to-Digital Releases
Year	Release	Artist	Format	Notes
2003	Goodbye, Babylon	Various Artists	CD box set with book	Nominated for the Grammy Award for Best Historical Album and the Best Boxed or Special Limited Edition Package
2004	Where Will You Be Christmas Day?	Various Artists	CD	Compiled by Lance Ledbetter and Dick Spottswood
2005	Fonotone Records Frederick, Maryland (1956-1969)	Various Artists	CD box set with book	Nominated for the Grammy Award for Best Boxed or Special Limited Edition Package; Compiled by Joe Bussard and Lance Ledbetter
2006	How Low Can You Go?: Anthology of the String Bass (1925-1941)	Various Artists	CD box set with book	Nominated for Jazz Journalists Association Award for Reissue/Historical Box Set of the Year; Compiled by Lance Ledbetter and Dick Spottswood
2006	Desperate Man Blues	Various Artists	CD	Soundtrack to film of the same name; won Living Blues Award for Best Historical Reissue
2006	Desperate Man Blues	Edward Gillan (director)	DVD	Documentary on Joe Bussard
2006	I Belong to this Band: 85 Years of Sacred Harp Recordings	Various Artists	CD	Compiled by Matt Hinton and Lance Ledbetter
2007	Art of Field Recording Sampler	Various Artists	CD	Won Grammy Award for Best Historical Album; nominated for Grammy Award for Best Liner Notes; and nominated for Association for Recorded Sound Collections Award for Excellence in Historical Recorded Sound Research; Compiled by Lance Ledbetter and Art Rosenbaum
2007	Art of Field Recording Volume I: Fifty Years Of Traditional American Music Documented By Art Rosenbaum	Various Artists	CD box set with book	Won Grammy Award for Best Historical Album; nominated for Grammy Award for Best Liner Notes; and nominated for Association for Recorded Sound Collections Award for Excellence in Historical Recorded Sound Research; Compiled by Lance Ledbetter and Art Rosenbaum
2007	Melodii Tuvi: Throat Songs and Folk Tunes from Tuva	Various Artists	CD	Liner notes by Dr. Pekka Gronow
2007	Black Mirror: Reflections in Global Musics	Various Artists	CD	Compiled by Ian Nagoski
2008	Victrola Favorites: Artifacts from Bygone Days	Various Artists	Two CDs with book	Compiled by Rob Millis and Jeffrey Taylor
2009	Art of Field Recording Volume II: Fifty Years Of Traditional American Music Documented By Art Rosenbaum	Various Artists	CD box set with book	Field recordings by Art Rosenbaum
2009	Take Me to the Water: Immersion Baptism in Vintage Music and Photography, 1890-1950	Various Artists	CD with book	Nominated for Grammy Award for Best Historical Album and Association for Recorded Sound Collections Award for Best Research in Recorded Country Music; Compiled by Jim Linderman and Lance Ledbetter
2009	Au clair de la lune	Édouard-Léon Scott de Martinville	Vinyl record	
2010	Jesus Christ from A to Z	Rev. Johnny L. Jones	Vinyl record	
2010	The Hurricane That Hit Atlanta	Rev. Johnny L. Jones	Two CD set	
2010	Excavated Shellac: Strings (Guitar, Oud, Lar, Violin and More from the 78rpm Era)	Various Artists	Vinyl/CD	Compiled by Jonathan Ward
2010	Baby How Can it Be?: Songs of Love, Lust and Contempt from the 1920s and 1930s	Various Artists	CD set	Compiled by John Heneghan and featuring liner notes by Nick Tosches
2010	Let Your Feet Do the Talkin'	Stewart Copeland (director)	DVD	Documentary on Thomas Maupin and clogging
2010	Ten Thousand Points of Light: 20th Anniversary Edition	George King (director)	DVD	Documentary on an Atlanta family's Christmas light display
2011	Ain't No Grave: The Life and Legacy of Brother Claude Ely	Brother Claude Ely	Book	Written by Macel Ely II. Includes a CD featuring a sermon by Claude Ely; nominated for Association for Recorded Sound Collections Award for Best Historical Research in Blues, Gospel, Hip-Hop or R&B
2011	Luk Thung: Classic & Obscure 78s from the Thai Countryside	Various Artists	CD	Compiled by David Murray
2011	Never a Pal Like Mother: Vintage Songs & Photographs of the One Who's Always True	Various Artists	Book with two CDs	Book features an introduction by Rosanne Cash and an essay by Sarah Bryan
2011	I Listen to the Wind that Obliterates My Traces: Music in Vernacular Photographs, 1880-1955	Various Artists	Book with two CDs	Compiled by Steve Roden
2011	Your Past Comes Back To Haunt You The Fonotone Years 1958–1965	John Fahey	CD box set	Compiled by Glenn Jones
2011	Opika Pende: Africa at 78 RPM	Various Artists	CD box set with book	Compiled by Jonathan Ward; Nominated for Grammy Award for Best Historical Album
2011	I Have My Liberty!: Gospel Sounds from Accra, Ghana	Various Artists	CD	Produced by Calpin Hoffman-Williamson
2011	Qat, Coffee & Qambus: Raw 45s from Yemen	Various Artists	CD	Compiled by Chris Menist
2012	Pictures of Sound: One Thousand Years of Educed Audio, 980-1980	Various Artists	Book and CD	Nominated for Grammy Award for Best Historical Album and won Association for Recorded Sound Collections Award for Excellence in Historical Recorded Sound Research
2012	Drop on Down in Florida: Field Recordings of African-American Traditional Music, 1977-1980	Various Artists	Two CDs and book	Compiled by Dwight DeVane and Blaine Waide
2012	Just Before Music	Lonnie Holley	CD/Vinyl	
2013	Greek Rhapsody: Instrumental Music from Greece, 1905-1956	Various artists	Two CDs and book	Compiled by Tony Klein
2013	Sorrow Come Pass Me Around: A Survey of Rural Black Religious Music	Various artists	CD/Vinyl	Liner notes by David Evans
2013	Kassidat: Raw 45s from Morocco	Various artists	CD/Vinyl	
2013	Longing for the Past: The 78 rpm Era in Southeast Asia	Various artists	CD box set with book	Nominated for Grammy Award for Best Historical Album; compiled by David Murray
2013	Keeping a Record of It	Lonnie Holley	CD/vinyl	
2013	Michigan-I-O: Alan Lomax and the 1938 Library of Congress Folk-Song Expedition	Various Artists	Book	Liner notes written by Todd Harvey
2014	Lead Kindly Light	Various artists	Two CDs and book	Compiled by Sarah Bryan and Peter Honig
2014	Parchman Farm: Photographs and Field Recordings, 1947-1959	Various artists	Two CDs and book	Nominated for Grammy Award for Best Historical Album; Compiled by Lance Ledbetter and Nathan Salsburg with essays by Alan Lomax, Anna Lomax Wood and Bruce Jackson
2014	Arkansas at 78 rpm: Corn Dodgers & Hoss Hair Pullers	Various artists	CD	Compiled by Tony Russell and Maxine Payne
2014	Making Pictures Three for a Dime		Book	Featuring vintage photo booth photography; compiled by Phillip March Jones
2015	No More Good Time in the World for Me	J.B. Smith	CD	Field recordings by Bruce Jackson, recorded at the Ramsey Unit in 1965-66; liner notes by Nathan Salsburg
2015	Ola Belle Reed and Southern Mountain Music on the Mason-Dixon Line	Ola Belle Reed	Two CDs and book	Compiled by Henry Glassie and Clifford Murphy
2015	The Birth of Rock and Roll: Photographs from the Collection of Jim Linderman	Jim Linderman and Joe Bonomo	Book	
2015	Rawhead & Bloodybones	Brian Harnetty	Two CDs	
2015	Don't Think I've Forgotten: Cambodia's Lost Rock and Roll	Various Artists	CD/Vinyl	Soundtrack for the documentary of the same name
2015	Folksongs of Another America: Field Recordings from the Upper Midwest, 1937-1946	Various Artists	CD box set with book and DVD	Nominated for Grammy Award for Best Liner Notes; compiled by James P. Leary
2015	Joe Bussard presents: The Year of Jubilo - 78 rpm Recordings of Songs from the Civil War	Various Artists	CD	Compiled by Joe Bussard
2015	Excavated Shellac: Reeds (Reed Performances from Tanzania, Kurdistan, Turkey, India, China and More from the 78 rpm Era)	Various Artists	CD/vinyl	Compiled by Jonathan Ward
2016	Bruce Conner: I'm Always Thinking of You	Bruce Conner	Greeting card	Reproduction of 1957 greeting card
2016	Don’t Think I’ve Forgotten: Cambodia’s Lost Rock and Roll	Various Artists	Double LP	Expanded vinyl edition of film soundtrack
2016	Blind Alfred Reed: Appalachian Visionary	Blind Alfred Reed	CD and book	Liner notes by Ted Olson
2016	Music of Morocco from the Library of Congress: Recorded by Paul Bowles, 1959	Various Artists	CD box set with book	Nominated for Grammy Award for Best Historical Album; Introduction by Lee Ranaldo and liner notes by Philip Schuyler
2016	Washington Phillips and His Manzarene Dreams	Washington Phillips	CD and book	Liner notes by Michael Corcoran
2017	Don’t Think I’ve Forgotten: Cambodia’s Lost Rock and Roll: Promo 45	Various Artists	Vinyl Record	Record Store Day Release
2018	Voices of Mississippi: Artists and Musicians Documented by William Ferris	Various Artists	CD box set with book and DVD	Nominated for Grammy Award for Best Historical Album; Nominated for Grammy Award for Best Liner Notes; Liner notes by Scott Barretta, David Evans, William Ferris and Tom Rankin
2018	Listen All Around: The Golden Age of Central and East African Music	Various Artists	Two CDs and book	Liner notes by Alex Perullo and Hugh Tracey
2018	The Early Films of William Ferris 1968-1975	Various films	DVD	Seven documentary films by William Ferris with a total running time of 115 minutes
2018	Voices of Mississippi: Artists and Musicians Documented by William Ferris	Various Artists	Vinyl	Single LP vinyl edition of box set
2020	Excavated Shellac: An Alternate History of the World’s Music	Various Artists	CD box set with book	Compiled by Jonathan Ward. Nominated for the Grammy Award for Best Historical Album.
2022	Hard Times Never Kill	Gonora Sounds	Digital only	Produced by David Aglow
2022	From the Lion Mountain: Traditional Music of Yeha, Ethiopia	Various Artists	Digital only	Produced by David Evans
2023	Bolinus Brandaris	Various Artists	CD and hardcover book	Produced by David Aglow
2024	Pied Piper of New Orleans	Babe Stovall	Digital only	Produced by David Evans
2025	Excavated Shellac: Voices	Various Artists	Digital only	Produced by Jonathan Ward
2025	Sun Gonna Shine	Roosevelt Holts	Digital only	Produced by David Evans

== Notes ==
- Bilger, Burkhard (April 28, 2008). "The Last Verse". The New Yorker.
- Petrusich, Amanda (December 10, 2007). "Various Artists: The Art of Field Recording, Vol. 1 review". Pitchfork.
- Radford, Chad (January 6, 2010). "Decade in Review: Goodbye Babylon Revisited revisited". Creative Loafing.
- Steele, Alicia. "Dust-to-Digital". This is Atlanta with Alicia Steele. PBA30.
