= Manzanita y su Conjunto =

Peruvian band

- Origin: Lima, Peru
- Genres: cumbia, guaracha
- Years active: 1969–present
- Labels: Dinsa, Virrey
- Members: Berardo Hernández Jr.
- Past members: Berardo Hernández; Héctor Mattos; Antonio Medina; Ricardo Valles; Enrique Ibérico; Hernan Huamán
- Website: manzanitaysuconjunto.com

Manzanita y su Conjunto are a Peruvian band founded by guitarist Berardo "Manzanita" Hernández in 1969. The band played an important role in the development of Peruvian cumbia as a genre distinct from its Colombian roots. Songlines wrote that Manzanita's music "revolutionised the music scene in Peru and left an indelible mark on Latin American music as a whole."

Alongside Hernández on guitar, Manzanita y su Conjunto also included Héctor Mattos on congos, Antonio Medina on bongos, Ricardo Valles on timbales, Enrique Ibérico on bass, and Hernan Huamán on organ. When Hernández died in 2007, his son took up leadership of the group.

== History ==
Berardo Hernández grew up in Trujillo province, Peru (possibly in Chiclín or Laredo) and moved to Lima in 1955 at the age of 12. At the age of 20 he played on the 1964 album Los Ídolos del Pueblo by Los Pacharacos. Hernández adopted the name Manzanita, meaning "little apple", in 1969, and that year Manzanita y su Conjunto released their first album Arre Caballito on Dinsa Records.

In 1973 Manzanita y su Conjunto signed to Virrey Records. Their 1973 album El Nuevo Sonido de Manzanita has a transitional sound between Peruvian tropical music and Peruvian cumbia, and unusually for the time features a horn section. In 1974 Manzaneando con Manzanita, the group's second album on Virrey, was released.

Manzanita died in 2007, and his son Berardo Hernández Jr. took up leadership of the band, using the name Manzanita Jr. In 2021 Analog Africa released a compilation of Manzanita y su Conjunto tracks from the 1970s called Trujillo, Perú 1971–1974. Manzanita y su Conjunto toured the UK in 2024.

== Discography ==
Albums

- Arre Caballito (1969, Dinsa)
- El Nuevo Sonido de Manzanita (1973, Virrey)
- Manzaneando con Manzanita (1974, Virrey)

Compilations

- Trujillo, Perú 1971–1974 (2021, Analog Africa)
