= Joe Bussard =

American collector of records (1936–2022)

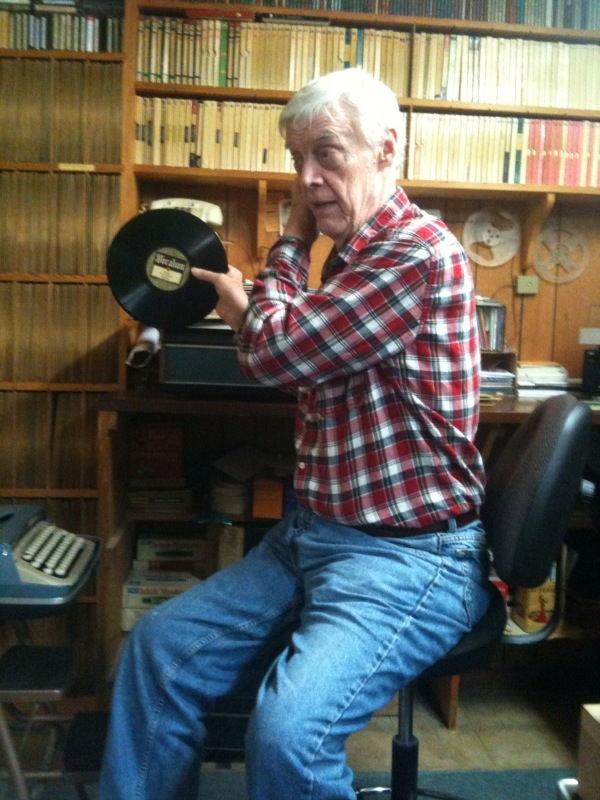
- Bussard talking about 78s

Background information
- Born: Joseph Edward Bussard Jr. July 11, 1936; Frederick, Maryland, U.S.
- Died: September 26, 2022 (aged 86) Frederick, Maryland, U.S.
- Occupation: Record collector
- Years active: 1951–2022
- Label: Fonotone
- Spouse: Esther Mae Keith (m. 1965; died 1999)

Joseph Edward Bussard Jr. (July 11, 1936 – September 26, 2022) was an American collector of 78-rpm records. He was noted for owning more than 15,000 records, primarily from the 1920s and 1930s, by the time of his death.

== Early life ==
Bussard was born in Frederick, Maryland, on July 11, 1936. His father managed the family's farm supply business, and his mother, Viola (Culler), was a housewife. Bussard began collecting when he was seven or eight, starting with Gene Autry records. During his teenage years, he and his cousin collected everything from rare coins to beehives to birds' nests. He attended Frederick High School, but left in eleventh grade without graduating. He initially worked at his family's business and in a supermarket, but he was unemployed from the late 1950s onwards.

== Career ==
Over his lifetime, Bussard amassed a collection of between 15,000 and 25,000 records, primarily of American folk, gospel, jazz, and blues from the 1920s and 1930s. From 1956 until 1970, Bussard ran the last 78 rpm record label, Fonotone, which was dedicated to the release of new recordings of old-time music. Among these were recordings by hundreds of performers, including the first recordings by the guitarist John Fahey. A five-CD anthology of Fonotone releases was issued in 2005 by Dust-to-Digital. It was nominated for the Grammy Award for Best Boxed or Special Limited Edition Package in 2006.

Bussard was the subject of a documentary film, Desperate Man Blues (2003), and his collection was mined for a compilation CD, Down in the Basement. He also authored his own entry in The Encyclopedia of Collectibles, which was published in 1978. He shared his collection, which included many only-known-copies of records, best-known copies, and numerous reissue labels, as well as work with individuals for whom he taped recordings from his collection for a nominal sum for decades. His daughter reckoned that a minimum of 150 individuals visited their home annually to hear him play songs and recount how he obtained his records.

In 2011, Bussard partnered with the Dust-to-Digital Foundation to begin the process of digitizing his collection, with the intent of preserving rare recordings and sharing them with the public in an online database.

Dust-to-Digital Foundation and UC Santa Barbara formed a partnership to make these recordings available to the public. In November 2025, more than 5000 songs from the foundation’s collection of over 50,000 songs were added to the Discography of American Historical Recordings (DAHR) database. While this release contains music from a variety of collections, the majority of the songs are from Bussard’s.

Bussard produced a weekly music program, Country Classics, for Georgia Tech's radio station, WREK Atlanta. He had radio programs on other stations: including WPAQ-AM 740 in Mount Airy, North Carolina, and WDVX in Knoxville, Tennessee. He disliked the city of Nashville, Tennessee, sometimes called "Music City", calling it "Trashville". His dislike for modern music, especially hip hop and rock and roll, was well documented.

In a 2022 interview, Bussard cited the recording, "Dark Was the Night, Cold Was the Ground" by Blind Willie Johnson, as one of the greatest recordings of all time. He visited a flea market in Emmitsburg, Maryland a month before his death to look for more 78s, but left empty-handed.

== Personal life ==
Bussard married Esther Mae Keith in 1965. She worked as a hairdresser and cosmetologist to support her family. They remained married for 34 years until her death in 1999. Together, they had a daughter, Susannah Anderson.

Bussard died on September 26, 2022, at his home in Frederick while in hospice care. He was 86, and was diagnosed with pancreatic cancer two years prior to his death.
