= The Green Arrows =

Zimbabwean band

- Also known as: The Mambo Jazz Band; The Gospel Arrows
- Origin: Zimbabwe
- Genres: wha wha
- Years active: 1966–1980s
- Past members: Zexie Manatsa, Stanley Manatsa, Givas Bernard, Fulton Chikiwati, Raphael Mboweni

The Green Arrows were a Zimbabwean band founded by brothers Zexie and Stanley Manatsa in 1966. They became the first Zimbabwean band to record an LP in 1976 with their debut Chipo Chiroorwa, and were highly successful in the 1970s. The musical style of the Green Arrows is called wha wha or hwahwa, meaning "beer" in Shona.

== History ==
Brothers Zexie and Stanley Manatsa founded the Green Arrows in 1966, initially under the name of the Mambo Jazz Band. The group changed their name to the Green Arrows in 1968, and by 1970 were the most popular bar band in Zimbabwe. In the early 1970s the Green Arrows were discovered by West Nkosi, who became their producer. Nkosi led them to record several popular singles, including "Chipo Chiroorwa", which became a gold record. It also became the title track of the Green Arrows' 1976 debut LP, the first recorded by a Zimbabwean band.

By the end of the 1970s the Green Arrows were extremely popular in Zimbabwe. The lyrics of their liberation song "Madzangara Dzimu" led the group to be briefly jailed in the lead-up to the Rhodesian general election of 1980, which preceded Zimbabwean independence. When Bob Marley performed at the Zimbabwean independence celebrations on 17 April 1980, the Green Arrows supported. In the 1980s the Green Arrows' popularity waned, and after some line-up changes they were renamed the Gospel Arrows and shifted towards recording religious music.

In 2007 Analog Africa released a digitally remastered compilation of Green Arrows material entitled 4-Track Recording Session, which included their entire debut album as well as ten singles from 1976 to 1979.

== Discography ==
=== Albums ===
- Chipo Chiroorwa (1976)

=== Compilations ===
- 4-Track Recording Session (2007, Analog Africa)

=== Singles ===
- "Chipo Chiroorwa"
