= Orchestre Poly-Rythmo de Cotonou =

Band from Cotonou, Benin

Background information
- Origin: Cotonou, Littoral, Benin
- Genres: Afrobeat; funk; soukous
- Years active: 1968-1980s, 2009-present
- Labels: Soundway, Analog Africa, Strut
- Members: Mélomé Clément (vocals, guitar); Papillon (guitar, piano); Adjanohoun Maximus (guitar); Eskill Lohento (vocals); Amenoudji Joseph Vicky (vocals); Agbemadon Paul Gabo (vocals); Kounkou Diak Theo (vocals); Yehouessi Leopold (drums); Sagbohan Danialou (drums); Vincent Ahéhéhinnou (vocals); Somassou Nestor (congas); Bentho Gustave (bass); Loko A. Pierre (saxophone, vocals); Koutouan Ossey Theodore (trumpet); Cakpo Cosme (trumpet); Tidiani Koné (saxophone, trumpet); Allade Lucien; Anago Cosme (vocals); Agbahoungba Philibert (guitar); D'Almeida Mathurin (drums, congas); Agonglo Bayo (drums); Loko Moïse (piano); Hounnonkpe Léon (piano); Guedou Thierry (brass); Ahouandjinou Martial (brass); Gnonlonfoun Samuel (brass); Alladé Vignéré (percussion); Atohoun Sylvain (vocals); Francois Hoessou

Orchestre Poly-Rythmo de Cotonou (sometimes prefaced with T.P. or Tout Puissant, French for "All Powerful") is a band from Cotonou, Benin, originally active from the 1960s to the 1980s and founded by singer-guitarist Mélomé Clément. They reformed in 2009 to international recognition. Their work has mixed styles such as funk, afrobeat, psychedelia, jazz and local voodoo influences. The Guardian called them "one of West Africa's best dance bands."

== Biography ==
Orchestre Poly-Rythmo de Cotonou was first formed by bandleader Mélomé Clément in 1968 under the name "Orchestre Poly-Disco" in the coastal town of Cotonou, Benin. Their debut album was originally released in 1973. From the late 1960s through the early 1980s, the group recorded around 500 songs in a variety of musical styles for various Beninese record labels, making them among the most prolific groups of the 20th century. The 1982 deaths of guitarist Papillon and drummer Yehouessi Léopold hobbled the group, and by the end of the 1980s they had disbanded.

=== Reformation ===
A compilation of their back catalogue, Reminiscin' in Tempo, was released on the Popular African Music label in 2003. The Kings of Benin Urban Groove 1972-80 was released on Soundway Records the following year. A trio of compilations released by Analog Africa beginning in 2008 brought the band to greater global attention.

This interest led the band to reform and tour internationally as a 10-piece group featuring five of the original members: singer/guitarist Mélomé Clément, singer Vincent Ahéhéhinnou, guitarist Maximus Ajanohun, saxophonist Pierre Loko, and bassist Gustave Benthoto. They released two new studio albums, Cotonou Club, in 2011 and Madjafalao in 2016, and toured in Europe and the United States.

Founder Clément died in 2012.

== Musical style ==
According to The Austin Chronicle, the band's "turbulent funk" style drew on "the percussive mysticism of traditional voodoo rituals" while blending Nigerian highlife, Afro-Cuban jazz, and indigenous folk styles with the sounds of James Brown, the Doors, and Funkadelic. The Quietus described their sound as a "heavy fusion of voodoo infused Afro-beat" indebted to Fela Kuti but "infused with the ancient sacred rhythms that had maintained the Benin people's links to their Dahomey roots" as well as "the youthful sounds emerging from both the Latin and African American diaspora," resulting in an urgent and optimistic psychedelic funk style. Pitchfork stated that the group "developed its own distinctive style of hard-driving funk but still found time to record in just about every style imaginable, from highlife, Afrobeat, and rumba to rock, jazz, soul, and folk."

== Discography ==
=== Recent discography ===
In its heyday the Orchestre Poly-Rythmo released several dozen LPs and singles. The following discography refers only to the publications of recent years.

==== Compilations ====
Title	Label	Year
T.P. Orchestre Poly-Rythmo de Cotonou (Reminiscin’ in Tempo – African Dancefloor Classis) [sic]	Popular African Music	2003
The Kings of Benin Urban Groove 1972-80	Soundway Records	2004
Volume 1: The Vodoun Effect – Funk & Sato from Benin’s Obscure Labels 1972–1975	Analog Africa	2008
Volume 2: Echos Hypnotiques – From the Vaults of Albarika Store 1969–1979	Analog Africa	2009
Volume 3: The Skeletal Essences of Afro Funk 1969-1980	Analog Africa	2013

==== Studio albums and reissues ====
Nouvelle Formule…	IACP	2007
The 1st Album	Analog Africa	2011 (reissue)
Cotonou Club	Strut Records	2011
Cotonou Club / Radio Poly-Rythmo	Sound d’Ailleurs	2011
Madjafalao	Because Music	2016
