= Teta Lando =

Angolan musician

- Born: June 2, 1948; Mbanza Congo, Zaire Province, Angola
- Died: July 14, 2008 (aged 60); Paris, France
- Genres: World
- Instrument: Viola

Alberto Teta Lando (June 2, 1948 – July 14, 2008) was an Angolan musician.

Teta was born in Mbanza Congo, the capital city of Zaire Province in the north of the country, and is Mukongo. He is well known in Portuguese-speaking African countries and Portugal itself.

His music focused on Angolan identity, the country's civil war, the saudades (nostalgia, melancholy, and longing) of Angolan exiles, as well as young love and family. He spoke and sang in both the Portuguese and Kikongo languages. Among his most well-known songs were "Irmão ama teu irmão" ("Brother, Love Your Brother") and "Eu vou voltar" ("I Will Return").

During the last several years of his life, he managed to reunite a group of many Angolan musicians.

He died in Paris, France, after battling cancer.

== Discography ==
- Memórias 1968-1990 (Teta Lando Produções, Luanda, Angola)
