= Little Nemo (band) =

French rock band

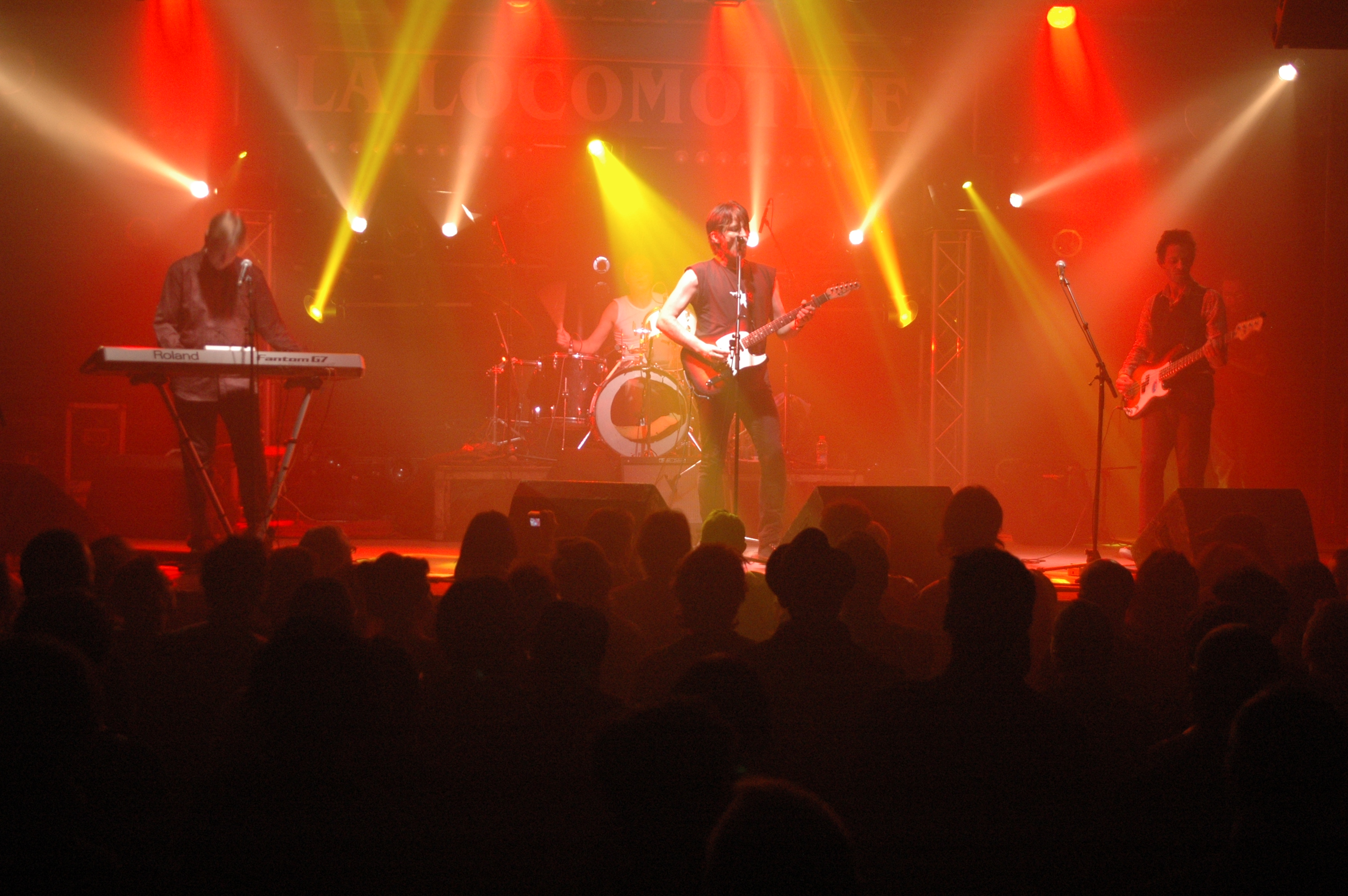
- Little Nemo at the "La Locomotive" in the Infrastipop Party, Paris, (2009).

Background information
- Origin: Vallée de Chevreuse, France
- Genres: Post-punk, new wave, gothic rock, cold wave, dark wave
- Years active: 1983–1992; 2008–present
- Labels: Artefact, Lively Art, Single KO, LN Music, Infrastition, Deanwell Global Music
- Members: Vincent Le Gallo; Nicolas Dufaure; Yves Charreire; Ronan Le Sergent
- Past members: Olivier Champeau; Georges Remiet
- Website: www.littlenemo.org

Little Nemo is a French gothic rock band formed in 1983 and originating from the region of Paris (Vallée de Chevreuse).

The name of the band was directly inspired by the comic Little Nemo in Slumberland. They and fellow coldwave bands Mary Goes Round and Asylum Party were part of the "Touching Pop" movement.

The band was originally composed of Olivier Champeau (vocals, keyboards) and Vincent Le Gallo (vocals, guitar, bass). Their first releases were two cassettes, La Cassette Froide (1986) and Past and Future (1987). Before the recording of their first EP, 1988's Private Life, the pair added Nicolas Dufaure, also known as "Bill" (bass, guitar, vocals).

On stage (and in the studio, starting in 1990), the group expanded to include Yves Charreire (drums), Ronan Le Sergent (keyboards, piano, organ), and Georges Remiet (guitar).

Little Nemo disbanded in 1992 but reformed in 2008 with a lineup of Le Gallo, Dufaure, Charreire, and Le Sergent, releasing the Out of the Blue comeback album on 21 September 2013.

Former member Champeau has released several techno-oriented albums under the alias "Doctorolive".

== Discography ==
=== Albums ===
- La Cassette Froide split cassette with Rain Culture (1986, Karnage Grafik)
- Past and Future (1987, Artefact)
- Sounds in the Attic (1989, Lively Art)
- Turquoise Fields (1990, Lively Art/2019 (reissue), Deanwell Global Music)
- The World Is Flat (1992, Single KO)
- 'Out of the Blue' (2013, LN Music)

=== Singles and EPs ===
- Private Life EP (1988, Artefact)
- "New Flood" 7" (1989, Lively Art)
- "Cadavres Exquis (Howard Song)" 12" EP (1990, Lively Art)
- "You Again" 12" single (1990, Lively Art)
- "City Lights (Long Way)" 12" single (1990, Lively Art)
- Bio-Logic EP (1991, Single KO)

=== Compilations ===
- Vol. 1 - 1987-89 (2009, Infrastition)
- Vol. 2 - 1987-89 (2009, Infrastition)
