= Abelardo Carbonó =

Colombian musician and songwriter

- Also known as: The godfather of champeta
- Born: 18 November 1948; Ciénaga, Colombia
- Died: 22 November 2021 (aged 73) Barranquilla, Colombia
- Genres: Champeta
- Spouse: Maritza Muñoz

Abelardo Carbonó (18 November 1948 – 22 November 2021) was a Colombian musician and songwriter. He was a pioneer of the Colombian musical genre of champeta, and released several albums with his own band as well as playing in the bands of Aníbal Velásquez and Omar Geles.

== Biography ==
Carbonó was born on 18 November 1948 in Ciénaga, in the Colombian department of Magdalena, to Elizabeth and Abelardo Carbonó, who had 12 other children. When Carbonó was a young child his family moved to Fundación, where his father led the band Los Tigrillos, who played porro and cumbia. In Fundación Carbonó formed a bolero trio with his brothers Abel and Jafeth, modelled on Los Panchos and Los Bríos.

When Carbonó finished high school he went to live with his grandfather in Barranquilla, the city where he spent the rest of his life. He wanted to train as a doctor, but was prevented by lack of money and joined the police instead, in 1963. Carbonó taught himself guitar and left the police to be a full-time musician in 1978.

Carbonó's first record "A Otro Perro con Ese Hueso" was released on record label Machuca in 1978, and was attributed to Le Groupe d'Abelard as an attempt to pass it off as the work of a Haitian conjunto. Carbonó released the LPs Guana Tangula (1980) and La Negra del Negrerío (1981) on Codiscos, and then joined Felito Records, where he "had the freedom to delve deeply into African sounds, Afrobeat, and psychedelia." On Felito, Carbonó released the albums Abelardo Carbonó y su Conjunto (1982) and Abelardo Carbonó y su Grupo (1986).

In the 1990s Carbonó joined the band of Aníbal Velásquez, and recorded some records that did not sell well. He also recorded with Morgan Blanco and with Omar Geles's band Los Diablitos. In 2013, Spanish record label Vampisoul released a compilation of Carbonó's work called El Maravilloso Mundo de Abelardo Carbonó, which led to renewed international interest in his music. Carbonó later released several singles on Bogotá label Palenque Records that he had recorded years before.

Carbonó died at home in Barranquilla on 22 November 2021, of complications due to COVID-19.

== Musical style and compositions ==
Carbonó contributed to the creation and development of the Colombian musical genre of champeta, in particular champeta criolla, alongside Viviano Torres. The genre has similarities to chimurenga, Nigerian highlife, makossa, and soukous. In the 1990s the sound of champeta changed significantly, becoming based around electronic drum beats, and for the most part Carbonó did not follow this trend.

Carbonó's notable compositions include "Carolina", "Palenque", "Quiero a Mi Gente", "Guana Tangula", "El Baile del Indio", and "Muévela".

== Albums ==
- Guana Tangula (1980, Codiscos)
- La Negra del Negrerío (1981, Codiscos)
- Abelardo Carbonó y su Conjunto (1982, Felito)
- Abelardo Carbonó y su Grupo (1986, Felito)
