= Cheryl Pawelski =

American record reissuer (b. 1966)

- Pronunciation: pa-VEL-ski
- Born: April 11, 1966 (age 60); Milwaukee, Wisconsin
- Education: Marquette University
- Occupation: Record company owner
- Years active: 1990-present
- Spouse: Audrey Bilger (m. 2008)
- Awards: Grammy Award for Best Historical Album: Hank Williams, The Garden Spot Programs, 1950 (2014) Mister Rogers' It’s Such A Good Feeling: The Best of Mister Rogers (2021) Wilco, Yankee Hotel Foxtrot (20th Anniversary Super Deluxe Edition) (2023) Written In Their Soul: The Stax Songwriter Demos (2024); Blues Music Award, Historical Album of the Year: Bobby Rush, Chicken Heads: A 50-Year History Of Bobby Rush (2017); Blues Blast Music Award, Best Historical or Vintage Recording: Johnny Shines, The Blues Came Falling Down, Live 1973 (2020); Little Richard, Southern Child (2021)
- Website: cherylpawelski.com

Cheryl Pawelski (born April 11, 1966 in Milwaukee, Wisconsin) is an American record producer and record-company executive. Since 2010, she has been one of the founder/owners of Omnivore Recordings, a Los Angeles-based record label specializing in historical releases, reissues and previously unissued vintage recordings, as well as select releases of new music.

Pawelski has won four Grammy Awards and has been nominated for four others, all in the Best Historical Album category, for releases by Omnivore Recordings, Stax/Craft Recordings, Rhino Records and Nonesuch.

== Early life ==
Pawelski is the oldest child of a family from Milwaukee. Her father worked in manufacturing and was a longtime musician who regularly volunteered as a piano player at a Milwaukee hospital. Her grandmother worked at a local department store which sold records, and encouraged Pawelski to begin a music collection at an early age. Another had pursued a career as a singer before working in banking, and also encouraged her to seek a musical career.

Pawelski attended Pius XI High School in Milwaukee, and graduated from Marquette University in 1989. After college but before moving to Los Angeles to begin her career in the music industry, Pawelski worked at a Milwaukee record store, Radio Doctors, to learn about record labels and distribution. A musician herself, Pawelski played in several bands.

== Career ==
Prior to co-founding Omnivore Recordings, Pawelski held positions at EMI-Capitol Records, Concord Music Group and Rhino Entertainment, and worked as a consulting producer for EMI-Capitol Music, Warner Strategic Marketing/Rhino, Rhino Handmade, iTunes, Sony Legacy, Rykodisc, Universal Music Group, BMG and others.

Pawelski has supervised recordings, reissues and boxed sets for a wide variety of artists including The Band, The Beach Boys, Big Star, John Coltrane, Miles Davis, Aretha Franklin, Bette Midler, Willie Nelson, Otis Redding, Nina Simone, The Staple Singers, Rod Stewart, Richard Thompson, Townes Van Zandt, Wilco, Hank Williams Sr. and Warren Zevon. She has also produced or overseen several reissues of film soundtrack albums, including Big Star: Nothing Can Hurt Me, Fiddler on the Roof, Raging Bull, Shutter Island, Up in the Air and Woodstock.

Pawelski’s board work has included positions as both a governor and a trustee of The Recording Academy, as well as board work or advisory board positions for The Blues Foundation, Women In Vinyl, The Producers and Engineers Wing of the Recording Academy, The Center For Recorded Music, Farm Aid Development Advisory Council, and Joey’s Song.

An inveterate collector of music and memorabilia, Pawelski holds a vast personal archive. A portion of her LP collection formed the core of the exhibit Spaced Out! The Final Frontier In Album Covers, which opened at Experience Music Project in Seattle, Washington, and also showed at The Museum at Bethel Woods in New York. The exhibit featured 117 space-themed albums released from 1940 to 1969.

=== Other work ===
Pawelski wrote the foreword for Derrick Bang's 2020 book Crime and Spy Jazz on Screen, 1950-1970: A History and Discography, published by McFarland.

== Awards and nominations ==
Pawelski has won four Grammy Awards for Best Historical Album: In 2014, for producing Hank Williams' The Garden Spot Programs, 1950, in 2021 for co-producing Mister Rogers' It’s Such A Good Feeling: The Best of Mister Rogers, in 2023 for co-producing Wilco's Yankee Hotel Foxtrot (20th Anniversary Super Deluxe Edition), and in 2024 for co-producing Written In Their Soul: The Stax Songwriter Demos. She received Grammy nominations for the box sets Rockin' Bones: 1950s Punk & Rockabilly, Where the Action Is! Los Angeles Nuggets: 1965–1968 and Woodstock 40 Years On: Back To Yasgur's Farm.

Pawelski won a 2017 Blues Music Award in the category of Historical Album of the Year, for producing the Bobby Rush box set Chicken Heads: A 50-Year History Of Bobby Rush.

Pawelski won Blues Blast Magazine's Blues Blast Music Award for Best Historical or Vintage Recording in both 2020 and 2021, for, respectively, Johnny Shines' The Blues Came Falling Down, Live 1973 and Little Richard's Southern Child.

In 2022, Pawelski was the recipient of the Diederich College of Communication's Professional Achievement Award, given annually to Marquette University alumni.

== Personal life ==
In 2008, Pawelski married Audrey Bilger, a literature professor and (since 2019) president of Reed College in Portland, Oregon.
