= George Gimarc =

American DJ and record producer (born 1957)

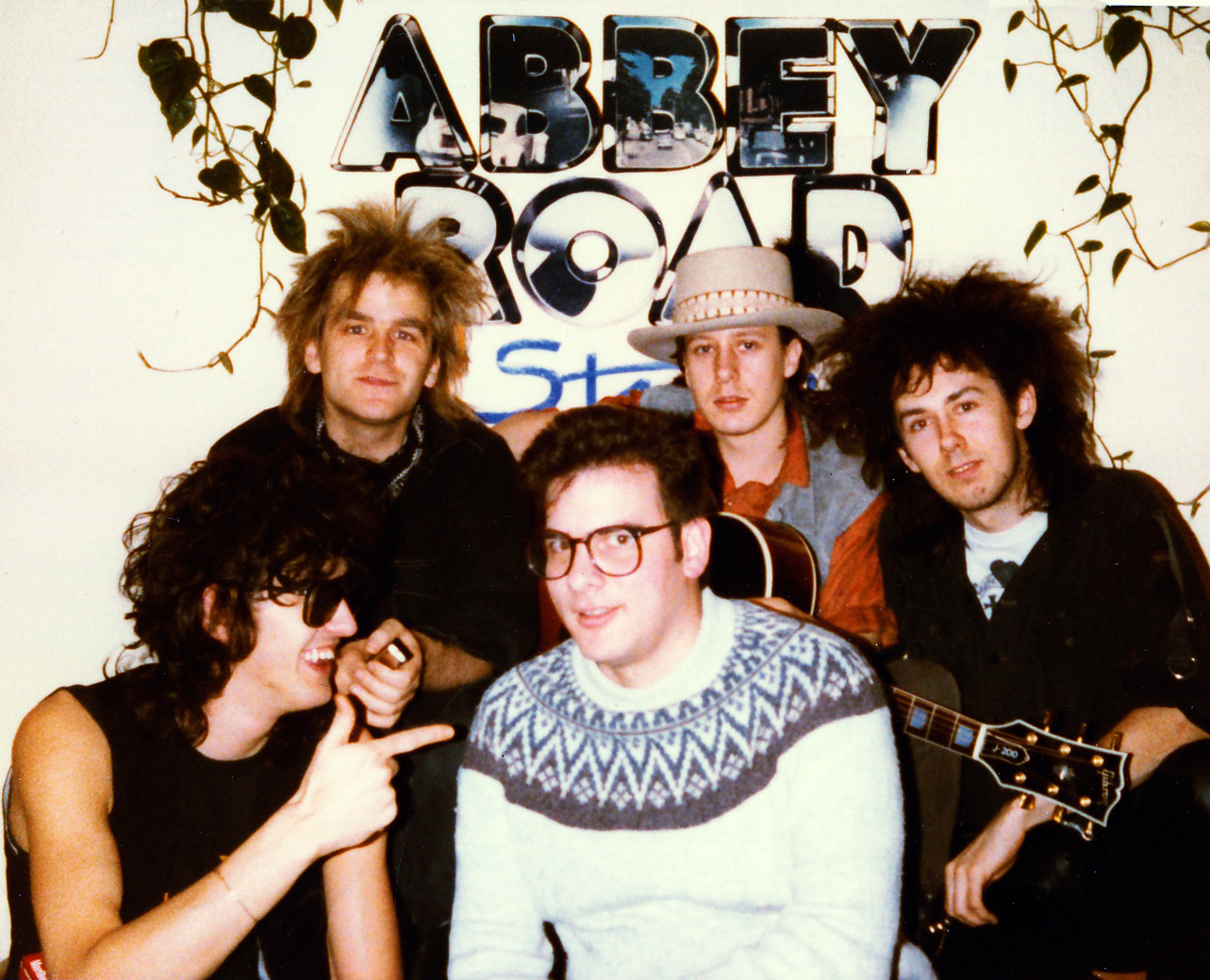
The Alarm, George Gimarc

George Douglas Gimarc (/ɡəˈmɑːrk/ ghə-MARK; born 1957) is an American disc jockey, record and radio program producer and author based in Texas and is in the Texas Radio Hall of Fame. He is known for his knowledge about the classic rock radio format, recorded music in general, and specifically the era of punk rock. His broadcast programs have been heard in various formats in the U.S., Canada, Europe and New Zealand, via licensed stations and unlicensed pirate radio transmitters.

== Early life ==
After attending Wallace Elementary School in Dallas, George Gimarc graduated from Lake Highlands High School in the class of 1975.

=== DJ career ===
Gimarc began his career as an intern at WRR AM in Dallas in April 1975, then worked at college as a disc jockey on the University of North Texas radio station KNTU. In the spring of 1977, he started a new weekly show called Punk & New Wave, which eventually became known as The Rock & Roll Alternative when it moved to KZEW-FM in Dallas, making its debut on May 18, 1980. This was one of the first regular new wave or punk radio shows in the United States.

The Rock & Roll Alternative program was responsible for introducing acts such as R.E.M., The Go-Go's, U2, The Psychedelic Furs, The Sex Pistols, Devo, The B-52's, XTC, The Smiths, The Cult, and hundreds of others to the listening audience of the Dallas and Fort Worth metroplex listening area from 1977 onwards. It went through three different theme songs, but its most familiar was the one provided by new friends The Bangles when they were recording their first album.

The Rock & Roll Alternative program moved to commercial radio on May 18, 1980, and continued for 14 years until it was retired. Along the way, it was heard on four different licensed stations throughout its run in Texas - KNTU / KZEW / KNON / KDGE. After the show moved to KZEW (The Zoo) in Dallas, George Gimarc in association with John England began to promote the ideology of free radio (as opposed to government censored radio) within the show. Gimarc announced the show as being heard on the flagship station KZEW and the Four Freedoms World Service (4FWS) which relayed the program via recordings for retransmission by a network of unlicensed pirate radio stations that transmitted on AM, FM and shortwave in Europe, and shortwave from New Zealand via KIWI Radio, to Australasia. A Texas network of Public-access television cable TV channels called 4FTN, also aired special editions of Gimarc's programs.

While Gimarc was hosting The Rock & Roll Alternative on KZEW-FM, in 1983 he also became music director on its sister AM station KRQX (K-Rocks) and turned it into a new format designed to be the flipside to the AOR sister station KZEW. While the Zoo was playing Kansas, The Eagles and Eddie Money, this new station played the older items they could no longer fit into the playlist - the Beatles, CCR, and Hendrix.

In 1987, after both KZEW and KRQX changed ownership (from Belo to Anchor) and formats, he began a new program called Back Pages on KZPS in Dallas. This was an eclectic classic rock show combining rare records, intriguing stories and listener requests.

In June 1989, Gimarc was the first official hire of the new station KDGE (The Edge) where he developed the new commercial alternative format along with Wendy Naylor. He was on air daily in the afternoons and served as Music Director as well as doing the R&R Alternative for another year or so. He, and several other key members of the staff were shown the door in 1993 when the station decided to take a more mainstream (chart) approach to music, and was no longer as keen on breaking new acts, as they were of following new trends.

=== Producer and author ===
While at KDGE, Gimarc produced and financed the twice-annual Tales From The Edge CD releases, eventually producing eleven volumes. All were loaded with unsigned local acts from North Texas, and for many groups was their first ever release on CD. In total, over 100,000 Tales From The Edge CDs were released in Dallas.

After leaving the station Gimarc also produced the Edge Home Movie, a music video collection hosted by Edge DJs, that was a free video rental via Blockbuster outlets in DFW. 1,000 units were produced each month, and there were about a dozen issues before the station lost interest in promoting videos from alternative bands that weren't necessarily on their playlist yet.

From left to right: Bryan Boyd, Eric Gardner, John Lydon, George Gimarc

In addition to his on-air work and CDs, Gimarc became the sole writer for Rotten Day, a nationally syndicated radio program starring John Lydon, which aired in over 50 markets. When the radio show, distributed by Album Network, concluded its run, John Lydon and Gimarc moved on to VH1 with the show 'Rotten Television' While doing the irreverent program for VH1, Lydon also got to be a live host on the red carpet for the Grammy Awards, with Gimarc helping along with special material and props for the guests. Gimarc acted as consultant for the Time/Life and The History of Rock and Roll series, compiled several record collections and written liner notes for many record labels. He has also written several books, including Punk Diary 1970-1979, Punk Diary 1980-1982 and Hollywood Hi Fi.

As a result of being a voracious record collector and remaining in Dallas for his entire career, Gimarc has amassed an enormous archive of Texas music stretching back over 100 years. On many occasions, North Texas alt bands have had long lost recordings presumed lost, returned to them in clear, digital restorations. His expertise in Texas Music has gained him a seat on the advisory board of the Texas Musicians Museum. Many items from his collection were on display there, including a field recorder used by Library of Congress historian Alan Lomax.

== 24/7Comedy and Today's Comedy ==
In 2008 Gimarc began developing an All-Comedy radio format for AM & FM with a partner launching it in Riverside, CA. in September 2010. In the two years that followed, 24-7 Comedy Radio grew to 20 affiliates across the US and Canada, as well as becoming a national channel on the new iHeart app. In July 2012 it was purchased by Clear Channel M+E and was rolled out on even more stations bringing the total by years end up to nearly 40 stations. Gimarc was Comedy Brand Manager for Clear Channel and ran the operation from Dallas with a small, tight staff. The entire crew was terminated in the summer of 2014 when the 24/7 Comedy brand was reduced to just a digital stream. At the same time, Gimarc launched his new FM & AM stream Today's Comedy brand which can be heard on the Audacy.com app as Comedy Now.

== Texas Music Hall Of Fame ==
After working as an archivist and guide for the Texas Musicians Museum in Irving Texas, he began working in the Texas Music Hall of Fame. As one of the commissioners on the Executive Coordinating Committee, Gimarc is responsible for setting up relationships with musicians, identifying items for future displays, and securing materials for the museum's archive. Along with other members of the Texas Music Hall of Fame, they promoted the Texas Music History Trail on several visits to the capitol in Austin, TX, building a network of similar, privately owned museums around Texas.

== Published works ==
Punk Diary 1970-79: "The beginning of punk in 1970. There are over 2,000 music news entries and 1,000 recordings detailed. Rare records are annotated with details."

Post-Punk Diary 1980-1982: "The mutation of punk into the thrash and Oi! movements, the rise of the New Romantic movement with groups like Duran Duran, Visage and Spandau Ballet. America heard new music from Boy George, R.E.M., 10,000 Maniacs, and The Bongos. Although it only covers three years in music, this complete day-by-day diary includes over 900 bands and in excess of 3,300 records."

Punk Diary 1970-82: The above two books combined into one publication.

Hollywood Hi Fi, (with Pat Reeder), St. Martin's Press: "An overview of 125 recordings by singing celebrities who really should never have been allowed into a recording studio. You wouldn't believe the songs sung by Jerry Mathers, Joe Pesci, Clint Eastwood, Leonard Nimoy, Bette Davis, Hogan's Heroes, Joan Rivers, Rex Reed, Mae West and others."
