= Analog Africa =

Record label based in Frankfurt

- Founded: 2006
- Founder: Samy Ben Redjeb
- Location: Frankfurt, Germany
- Official website: analogafrica.com

Analog Africa is a reissue record label based in Frankfurt, established in 2006 by DJ Samy Ben Redjeb.

== History ==
Samy Ben Redjeb is from Tunisia, and while working as a flight attendant in the 1990s he collected records from across the African continent. Redjeb conceived of the label in 2001, hoping to release an obscure record by Zimbabwean artist Oliver Mtukudzi from 1977, a project that never came to fruition. The first release on the label was a compilation of tracks from the 1970s by Harare band The Green Arrows.

The label gained wider recognition with its third release, a compilation of 1970s recordings by bands from Benin and Togo. Redjeb's interest in Beninese music was partly due to a chance meeting with Gnonnas Pedro at a time when Zimbabwe was becoming more dangerous. In total Analog Africa has released two compilations of music by Beninese artists as well as four records by Cotonou band Orchestre Poly-Rythmo de Cotonou, whom Redjeb considers "the most versatile and powerful band that ever existed."

Analog Africa predominantly reissues music that is otherwise hard to find. Redjeb has said that "I find it really interesting to take something from total obscurity to the global audience because the musicians who originally played the song are really proud of it."

Analog Africa was nominated for a Grammy in 2026 for:

- Roots Rocking Zimbabwe, The modern Sound of Harare Towmships (1965-1980) released in 2025 and
- Super Disco Pirata, de Tepito Para El Mundo (1965-1980) released in 2024.

== Notable releases ==
- Take One (2006), a compilation of remastered hits and rare tracks by Zimbabwean group Hallelujah Chicken Run Band.
- African Scream Contest: Raw & Psychedelic Sounds From Benin & Togo 70s (2008), which brought the label wider recognition.
- Angola Soundtrack (volume 1 in 2010, volume 2 in 2013), a two-volume album series of Angolan popular music from 1968–1978
- Diablos del Ritmo: The Colombian Melting Pot 1960–1985 (2012)
- Saturno 2000: La Rebajada de Los Sonideros 1962-1983 (2022), a compilation of cumbia rebajada music that Uncut called "gleefully disconcerting stuff".
- Roi Du Ziglibithy (2022), a vinyl reissue of four remastered tracks by Ivorian musician Ernesto Djédjé.
- Congo Funk! Sound Madness from the Shores of the Mighty Congo River (Kinshasa/Brazzaville 1969–1982) (2024), a compilation of Congolese rumba.
- Super Disco Pirata: De Tepito Para El Mundo 1965–1980 (2024), a compilation of bootlegged cumbia records from Mexico City.
- Roots Rocking Zimbabwe: The Modern Sound of Harare' Townships 1975–1980 (2025)
