= Asylum Party =

French post-punk/coldwave/nowave band

- Origin: Courbevoie, France
- Genres: Post-punk, cold wave
- Years active: 1985–1990
- Labels: Asylum Yield, Lively Art, Infrastition, Deanwell Global Music
- Past members: Thierry Sobézyk; Philippe Planchon; Pascale Macé

Asylum Party were a French post-punk/cold wave band formed in 1985 in Courbevoie by guitarist-vocalist Philippe Planchon and bassist-vocalist Thierry Sobézyk. The duo later added keyboardist Pascale Macé. Their sound had gothic rock influences and was very similar to English post-punk bands. Asylum Party, along with fellow French cold wave bands of the same period such as Little Nemo and Mary Goes Round, were considered part of the "Touching Pop" movement (Sobézyk also played in the latter).

Founding member Sobézyk died in 2019 due to leukemia.

== Discography ==
Studio albums

- Picture One (1988, Asylum Yield/2016 and 2020 reissue, Deanwell Global Musc)
- Borderline (1989, Lively Art/2020 reissue, Deanwell Global Music)
- Mère (1990, Lively Art)

EPs

- What Will You Learn (1989, Lively Art)

Compilation albums

- The Grey Years Vol. 1 (2006, Infrastition)
- The Grey Years Vol. 2 (2006, Infrastition)

Singles

- "Ticket to Ride" 7" single (1989, Lively Art)
