= Independencia, Monterrey =

Independencia is a neighborhood in Monterrey, Nuevo León, Mexico.

== History ==
This neighborhood has a different history than other already established settlements in the city. In the second half of the 19th century and first years of the 20th century, the city of Monterrey experienced the boom of the industrialization, along with a fast-growing and thriving economy. However, there was a huge demand for cheap labor workers. The government thus promoted the immigration of people from other states. The neighborhood Independencia was established with the name of 'Barrio San Luisito' in the late years of the 19th century, with poor immigrants from the states of San Luis Potosí and Zacatecas being a predominant demographic. Later, the neighborhood was settled by people from other Mexican states who tried to get into the bracero program to work in the United States, but some were rejected by the program in the US. The Mexican government offered these people to settle in a promising city like Monterrey, then having one of the most impressive rates of economic growth in the country. Those new arrivals from San Luis Potosí, Zacatecas and other states from Central and Southern Mexico faced both ethnic and class segregation by the people of Monterrey at first, but eventually were accepted as part of the rest of the society.

== Today ==
Despite Independencia's economic wealth, today, it is still one of the poorest neighborhoods in Monterrey. In 2009, Tracy Wilkinson, of the Los Angeles Times, recalled seeing many dogs and donkeys in the street. As of that year, unemployment was common. Independencia had been home to many local drug dealers for many years. Within two years leading up to 2009, major drug cartels (especially the Zetas), began to make inroads into Independencia and pinned the residents against the government.
