= Cumbia rebajada =

Subgenre of Mexican cumbia

Cumbia rebajada is a musical subgenre derived from Colombian cumbia and Mexican cumbia that emerged in Monterrey, Nuevo León (Mexico).

== History ==
Due to Colombian immigration to Monterrey in the second half of the 20th century and the importation of records from Mexico City, various musical genres from the South American country became popular, such as cumbia, vallenato, and porro. This popularization through parties would give rise to the phenomenon known as "Kolombia" in places like the Independencia neighborhood. According to Gabriel Duéñez, a sound engineer for four decades and a collector of Colombian music from Monterrey, the rebajada originated accidentally when the beats-per-minute control on his Sonido Duéñez music player broke down and began to play Colombian music at a slower speed, resulting in a "more rebajado (slowed-down), more watery" rhythm.

Those attending his dances began to request that Duéñez play the rebajada music than at its normal tempo. Gabriel and other vendors in Monterrey began selling cassettes and later CDs of reduced versions of popular cumbias. Given the popularity of the music, Colombian music groups in the city began to compose and perform at that tempo. Cumbia rebajada would remain in Monterrey, becoming part of the cultural phenomenon known as cholombiano. The reduced aesthetic would also influence the sonidero, where groups such as Sonido La Changa and Sonido Siboney continued the style by manipulating the tempo of old Colombian songs, turning them into hits in Mexico and Central America.

According to DJ and music producer Toy Selectah, cumbia rebajada is "the dubstep of cumbia." DJs, producers, and musicians of different nationalities have mixed cumbia rebajada with other rhythms such as dubstep and reggae.

== Characteristics ==
Since cumbia rebajada emerged from technological manipulation outside of its live performance, it emulates the classic rhythms and instrumental compositions of Colombian cumbia (percussion, bass, and trumpets) and vallenato (snare drum, guacharaca, and accordion), but at a slower tempo, approximately 76 beats per minute. This results in a slower rhythm, with the brass instruments (trumpets and saxophones) and accordions having a deeper sound and the singer's voice lowering.
