= Voices of Mississippi: Artists and Musicians Documented by William Ferris =

Box set by William Ferris
- Released: 2018

Voices of Mississippi: Artists and Musicians Documented by William Ferris is a four-disc box set compiled by William Ferris, released in 2018. The project earned Ferris two Grammy Awards for Best Historical Album and Best Album Notes. The set includes "three CDs featuring blues, gospel, and storytelling recordings, one DVD featuring documentary films," and a book containing essays from musicologists such as Scott Barretta, David Evans, and Tom Rankin.
