= Debutante (Cait Brennan album) =

Studio album by Cait Brennan
- Released: January 22, 2016
- Recorded: July 22–28, 2015
- Genre: Indie rock, glam rock
- Length: 44:45
- Label: Black Market Glamour (initial release), Omnivore Recordings
- Producer: Cait Brennan and Fernando Perdomo

Cait Brennan chronology
Debutante (2016)	Third (2017)

Debutante is the debut full-length album released by American singer-songwriter Cait Brennan, released on January 22, 2016. The album was independently produced and released on Brennan's own label, Black Market Glamour, and initially sold in small numbers online and through mail-order only. Debutante was a surprise critical favorite, placing highly on multiple lists of the best albums of 2016, including WFMU, Popdose, and the Village Voice Pazz & Jop poll. Its success led Brennan to an initial demo recording deal with Seymour Stein and Sire Records, followed by a long term recording deal with Omnivore Recordings, who will release Brennan's debut for the label, Third, on April 21, 2017.

The album was co-produced by Brennan and Fernando Perdomo, a producer and rock artist who also co-produced Linda Perhacs' widely acclaimed 2014 album The Soul of All Natural Things for Asthmatic Kitty records. Perdomo and Brennan met as fellow artists on the International Pop Overthrow festival in 2012, and quickly became friends; Brennan appears in Perdomo's "Smile" music video, and Perdomo has played in Brennan's touring band.

The entire 12-song album was recorded in five days. Brennan funded the initial production of the album through Kickstarter and exceeded her funding goal in just 69 hours. During the campaign, Brennan received social media support from Laura Jane Grace, Neil Gaiman, James Urbaniak, and John Darnielle of The Mountain Goats. Brennan dedicated the album to Harry Nilsson, who she described to the Arizona Republic as "probably my biggest and most heartfelt influence."

The first track released from Debutante was "Dear Arthur," which was featured as a Paste exclusive premiere in mid-January 2016. Brennan describes the song as an "accidental" ode to her late father, a realization that only hit well after the song was written. Presenter Ros Barclay of CamGlen Radio in Rutherglen (suburban Glasgow) was the first terrestrial radio broadcaster to play the song.

The album has received positive reviews. Writing in PopDose, Keith Creighton said "Debutante, a sparkling album produced by Brennan and Fernando Perdomo, is right up there with the great "drenched in blood, sweat & tears, leave everything on the table, conquer the world" albums like Against Me!'s New Wave, Guns N' Roses' Appetite for Destruction, Green Day's American Idiot and Smashing Pumpkins' Gish." American Songwriter's Peter Gerstenzang said "Debutante depicts an artist remarkably conversant with the last forty years of Pop, who is able to blend her influences and obsessions into one glimmering musical gem after another." Describing the experience of listening to her music in the wake of David Bowie's passing, he said "Now that we have lost that glorious weirdo, David Bowie, it's also nice to know that a new one, Cait Brennan, is hovering into view...which feels like a bit of solace for those of us who felt Bowie's loss so keenly. In other words, it's nice to have a new songwriter out there, who is so...out there." Popshifter's Melissa Bratcher said Brennan "has one of the best pure rock voices you're likely to hear. Marry that to an insane range and so-sweet-they-melt-in-your-ear harmonies, and then add them to the sundae of glorious melodies and whip-smart lyrics and you've got yourself a mixed metaphor. But you've also got a stunning debut...Cait Brennan has made a glimmering record full of heart and hope and harmony. It's a timeless album; joyful, clever, and wonderful. You owe it to yourself to hear her. The Milwaukee Journal Sentinel's Jon M. Gilbertson said the album "deserves as much attention for its mid-1970s eloquence as for the fact that Brennan is transgender and 46." Writing for Rust, Eric Peterson said "Cait Brennan's music is as powerful and individual as she is, and Debutante is an example of an artist putting everything they have into their work." Writer Todd Alcott described the album as "hearkening to the days when pop music albums were created to get lost in, with lush harmonies and intricate multi-layered arrangements, (Debutante) has its roots in English pop, roughly the decade between Penny Lane and This Year's Model, taking in Diamond Dogs and Goodbye Yellow Brick Road" and stuffing in healthy chunks of Aztec Camera as well, with lyrics that are simultaneously deeply personal and broadly universal. The fact that it was recorded in the space of time usually set aside for fine-tuning a snare-drum sound makes her achievement all the more remarkable." The followup to Debutante, Third, was recorded at Ardent Studios in Memphis in December 2016, and will be released on Omnivore Recordings on April 21, 2017.

== Track listing ==
1. "Good Morning and Goodnight" 3:08
2. "Underworld" 4:03
3. "Dear Arthur" 4:03
4. "Lines" 4:17
5. "Once Upon a Nevermind" 3:10
6. "I Want You Back" 2:29
7. "Showman" 2:24
8. "Father McKenzie" 4:22
9. "Meet Your Remaker"2:11
10. "Harmony Lies" 4:49
11. "All in Love Is Fair" 4:44
12. "Madame Pompadour" 3:27
13. "Black Diamond" 4:34
