= Cait Brennan =

American singer-songwriter

- Also known as: M. C. Brennan
- Born: February 14, 1969 (age 57); Phoenix, Arizona, U.S.
- Occupations: Singer; songwriter; record producer; screenwriter
- Years active: 2015–present
- Musical career
- Genres: Glam rock; psychedelic soul; R&B; funk; soul; pop; art rock
- Labels: Omnivore Recordings; Black Market Glamour
- Website: planetcait.com

Wendilyn Marielle Caitlin Brennan (born February 14, 1969), better known by her stage name Cait Brennan, is an American singer, songwriter, record producer, and screenwriter. Brennan's musical style contains elements of glam rock, psychedelic soul, R&B, Indie pop, and power pop, also drawing on vaudeville, music hall, mythical, and biblical themes. In 2016, Brennan released her first full-length studio album Debutante, which appeared on the 2016 Village Voice Pazz & Jop list. Her second studio album Third was recorded at Ardent Studios in Memphis and was released via Omnivore Recordings on April 21, 2017.

== Beginnings (1989–2012) ==
Brennan was born in Phoenix, Arizona, and raised by her great-grandmother, a Thoroughbred horse racing seamstress. She began writing songs as a child; lacking in musical training, she sang songs into a simple cassette recorder, and eventually began her performance career while beginning a gender transition in her teens. After multiple incidents of violence, she stopped performing publicly for nearly two decades. In 2009, reflecting on her work from the 1990s, Curve declared that Brennan "almost became the first great transgender rock star". Brennan was interviewed by Against Me! frontwoman Laura Jane Grace in episode 3 of Grace's AOL Originals series "True Trans". Before returning to music, she pursued careers in journalism, screenwriting and acting.

== Return to Performance and Debutante (2012–2016) ==
Encouraged by friends who had heard her songs, Brennan returned to live performance in 2012, and quickly received praise for her work; Village Voice Media's Serene Dominic praised her as a "smart, melodic singer-songwriter", and an early live performance and interview with Brennan was featured on the KAET/Tempe Center for the Arts public television concert series "Songwriters Showcase", which premiered on PBS stations in fall 2013. The Arizona Republic praised the "cinematic sweep" of her songs. Java Magazine's Mitchell Hillman echoed that praise, calling Brennan "a great musician and a formidable writer", and author Neil Gaiman praised her cover version of David Bowie's Five Years as "glorious". While her lead vocals generally hover in the mid-tenor, Brennan has a five-octave range and sings all the background harmonies on her albums. Matt Keeley of Unicorn Booty dubbed her "Lady Nilsson" for her frequent homages to the late singer-songwriter, while International Pop Overthrow founder David Bash praised her as "a singer songwriter with a unique brand of glitter glam soulful rock n' roll sung straight from the heart. Plus, you gotta love anyone who can channel Roy Orbison, Elton John, Freddie Mercury, John Lennon, and Etta James in the space of a single set."

Her debut album, Debutante, was co-produced by Brennan and Fernando Perdomo, a producer and rock artist who also co-produced Linda Perhacs' widely acclaimed 2014 album The Soul of All Natural Things for Sufjan Stevens' Asthmatic Kitty records, and has performed with Fiona Apple, Beck, Todd Rundgren and Jakob Dylan. Perdomo and Brennan met as fellow artists on the International Pop Overthrow festival in 2012, and quickly became friends; Brennan appears in Perdomo's "Smile" music video.

The album was recorded in five days. Brennan funded the initial production of the album through Kickstarter and exceeded her funding goal in just 69 hours. During the campaign, Brennan received social media support from Laura Jane Grace, Neil Gaiman, James Urbaniak and John Darnielle of The Mountain Goats. The first track released from Debutante was "Dear Arthur", which was featured as a Paste exclusive premiere in mid-January 2016. Presenter Ros Barclay of CamGlen Radio in Glasgow was the first terrestrial radio broadcaster to play the song.

WFMU presenter Evan "Funk" Davies was an early champion of Brennan and Debutante, giving the record its first US terrestrial radio airplay and frequently playing numerous tracks from the album on his eponymous show.

The album received widespread acclaim, landing on multiple year-end best-of lists including the Village Voice Pazz & Jop list; writing in PopDose, Keith Creighton said Debutante "...is right up there with the great 'drenched in blood, sweat & tears, leave everything on the table, conquer the world' albums like Against Me!'s New Wave, Guns N' Roses' Appetite for Destruction, Green Day's American Idiot and Smashing Pumpkins' Gish." American Songwriter's Peter Gerstenzang said "Debutante depicts an artist remarkably conversant with the last forty years of Pop, who is able to blend her influences and obsessions into one glimmering musical gem after another." Describing the experience of listening to her music in the wake of David Bowie's passing, he said "Now that we have lost that glorious weirdo, David Bowie, it's also nice to know that a new one, Cait Brennan, is hovering into view...which feels like a bit of solace for those of us who felt Bowie's loss so keenly. In other words, it's nice to have a new songwriter out there, who is so...out there." Popshifter's Melissa Bratcher said Brennan "has one of the best pure rock voices you're likely to hear. Marry that to an insane range and so-sweet-they-melt-in-your-ear harmonies, and then add them to the sundae of glorious melodies and whip-smart lyrics and you've got yourself a mixed metaphor. But you've also got a stunning debut...Cait Brennan has made a glimmering record full of heart and hope and harmony. It's a timeless album; joyful, clever, and wonderful. You owe it to yourself to hear her. The Arizona Republic's Ed Masley said "This pop classicist has packed her first album with songs that marry timeless hooks to introspective lyrics. Setting the tone with the wistful, Mccartney-esque intro of "Good Morning and Goodnight", the singer delivers an album that should speak to several generations of power-pop enthusiasts, whether they cut their teeth on Big Star and the Raspberries or Teenage Fanclub in the '90s. The Milwaukee Journal Sentinel's Jon M. Gilbertson said the album "deserves as much attention for its mid-1970s eloquence as for the fact that Brennan is transgender and 46." Writing for Rust, Eric Peterson said "Cait Brennan's music is as powerful and individual as she is, and Debutante is an example of an artist putting everything they have into their work." A live album, From The City Of New York, was recorded at Rockwood Music Hall in February 2016 on the abbreviated Debutante tour, and released in June 2016.

== Sire Records and Introducing The Breakdown (2016) ==
The independently released Debutante caught the ear of Sire Records President Seymour Stein, who discovered The Ramones, Talking Heads, Madonna and many others. Stein signed Brennan to a demo deal with Sire/Warner Bros. Records in June 2016. Brennan co-produced demos for Sire in Los Angeles with Perdomo and producer Andy Paley, with guests including James King of Fitz and the Tantrums, but Sire ultimately declined to sign Brennan.

After Debutante, Brennan initially announced that the followup would be called Jinx, a tongue-in-cheek reference to the Sophomore slump. Initial recording for the second album took place in December 2015. But in March 2016, while on the Debutante tour, Brennan developed a serious infection from a cat bite, and subsequent complications led to a life-threatening illness. The remainder of the tour was canceled, and during her hospital stay and subsequent recovery, Brennan drastically revised the finished Jinx masters and wrote a number of new songs. The resulting album, Introducing The Breakdown According To Cait Brennan, was originally slated for release on Brennan's own Black Market Glamour label, but Brennan ultimately shelved the album for a later date, opting to record an entirely new third album instead, citing both the upheaval in her own life and the uncertainty and change following the 2016 Presidential Election.

== Omnivore Recordings and Third (2017–present) ==
During the Sire Records demo sessions, Brennan and Perdomo attended a Grammy Museum presentation celebrating the 50th Anniversary of Ardent Studios. At the event, Brennan and Perdomo encountered Big Star drummer and Ardent president Jody Stephens, who invited the pair to record their third album at Ardent in Memphis. When the Sire deal did not materialize, the duo traveled to Memphis and recorded 13 songs in three days, with Brennan and Perdomo producing and playing all the instruments, and Ardent's Adam Hill engineering the sessions. During the sessions, the pair used many of the same instruments and amplifiers used by Big Star during their heyday, including Alex Chilton's Hi-Watt amps, Mellotron and Chris Bell's cherry red Gibson guitar. The album was mastered by Grammy-winning audio engineer Michael Graves; Cheryl Pawelski of Omnivore Recordings, who had a long history working with Ardent and Big Star, signed Brennan to Omnivore in January 2017, slating Brennan's Third for an April 2017 release to coincide with Record Store Day.

== Writing and film ==
Brennan co-wrote the screenplay for the romantic comedy "Love or Whatever", directed by Rosser Goodman, which made its world premiere at the 2012 Frameline Film Festival. She also appears in the film. Bay Area critic George Heymont praised the film as "a rowdy romp" and "that rare gem: a sexy and intelligent gay romantic comedy." TLA Releasing released the film in Fall 2014. While in college, Brennan received the Arizona Commission on the Arts Screenwriting fellowship in 2002, and the following year, she won the Phoenix Film Festival's Best Screenplay award for "The People's Choice". Brennan was honored with the Outfest Screenwriting Lab Fellowship in 2007 for her comic homage to 1980s John Hughes films, "Dramatis Personae". In October 2007, the Rhode Island International Film Festival awarded first prize to Brennan and "Dramatis Personae" in their annual screenwriting honors. In 2014, Brennan co-wrote (along with writer Doug Bost) the Alzheimer's-focused short "Policy of Truth", directed by Nick Demos.

In 2010, she joined the staff of Phoenix's LGBT-focused Echo Magazine. and was the magazine's music critic from 2013 to 2016.

== Personal life ==
In late 2013, Brennan was diagnosed with young onset Parkinson's disease, and has cited that diagnosis as ongoing motivation for the burst of creative activity that has followed. Her illness has not significantly impacted her ability to record or tour; she pursues an intensive physical and voice therapy regimen to maintain her ability to perform.

Brennan is bisexual and an advocate for LGBT rights, especially for the transgender community.

== Discography ==
Studio albums

- 2016 – Debutante
- 2017 – Third
- 2018 – Introducing the Breakdown According to Cait Brennan (completed, announced)
