= Echo in the Canyon (soundtrack) =

Soundtrack album by Various artists
- Released: 2019
- Length: 41:14
- Label: BMG
- Producer: Andrew Slater

Echo in the Canyon is a soundtrack for the documentary film of the same name.

== Reception ==
Aidin Vaziri of The San Francisco Chronicle said the soundtrack "rings hollow", stating, "Dylan's deep, oddly expressionless voice doesn't necessarily do any favors to a genre known for its marked warmth, and his slick band of studio musicians adds to the disconnect," while praising the talent of the album's many guests. Stephen Thomas Erlewine of AllMusic commented, "Since everybody involved is a pro, this is tight, not loose, which means every cut feels a little too tidy and straight. Dylan proves to be an amiable host, [...] and the mellow camaraderie is appealing and even ingratiating. It isn't especially compelling, though."

== Track listing ==
No.	Title	Length
1.	"Go Where You Wanna Go" (feat. Jade Castrinos)	3:07
2.	"The Bells of Rhymney" (feat. Beck)	3:32
3.	"You Showed Me" (feat. Cat Power)	3:32
4.	"She" (feat. Josh Homme)	2:37
5.	"In My Room" (feat. Fiona Apple)	2:19
6.	"Goin' Back" (feat. Beck)	4:09
7.	"Never My Love" (feat. Norah Jones)	3:22
8.	"It Won't Be Wrong" (feat. Fiona Apple)	1:58
9.	"No Matter What You Do" (feat. Regina Spektor)	2:47
10.	"Questions" (feat. Eric Clapton and Stephen Stills)	3:33
11.	"I Just Wasn't Made for These Times" (feat. Neil Young)	3:19
12.	"Expecting to Fly" (feat. Regina Spektor)	3:32
13.	"What's Happening" (feat. Neil Young)	3:27

All led by Jakob Dylan.

== Personnel ==
- Fiona Apple – vocals
- Beck – vocals
- Justine Bennett – backing vocals
- D.J. Bonebrake – vibraphone
- Jade Castrinos – vocals
- Lenny Castro – congas, percussion
- Matt Chamberlain – drums
- Daphne Chen – violin
- Eric Clapton – electric guitar, vocals
- Richard Dodd – cello
- Jakob Dylan – vocals
- Aaron Embry – harp, piano
- Eric Gorfain – violin
- Josh Homme – vocals
- Ted Jensen – mastering
- Norah Jones – vocals
- Leah Katz – viola
- Greg Leisz – acoustic guitar, banjo
- Maude Maggart – vocals
- Geoff Pearlman – 12 string guitar, acoustic guitar, electric guitar, steel guitar, slide guitar
- Fernando Perdomo – coral sitar, glockenspiel, 12 string guitar, acoustic guitar, baritone guitar, electric guitar, Hammond organ, percussion
- Cat Power – vocals
- Dan Rothchild – bass, drums, backing vocals
- Andrew Slater – acoustic guitar, fuzz guitar
- Regina Spektor – vocals
- Jawn Starr – piano
- Stephen Stills – electric guitar, vocals
- Jordan Summers – mellotron, Hammond organ, piano, strings, Vox organ
- Matt Tecu – drums
- Patrick Warren – chamberlin, keyboards, Hammond organ, percussion
- Dave Way – engineer, mixing
- Neil Young – vocals
