= Chris Price (musician) =

American musician

- Price in 2014

Background information
- Born: Kristian Price Pérez; August 26, 1984 (age 42); Miami, Florida, U.S.
- Genres: Rock; pop rock; power pop
- Occupations: Musician; singer; record producer
- Instruments: Vocals; piano; organ; keyboards; guitar; bass; drums
- Years active: 2005–present
- Label: Geffen (formerly)

Chris Price (born Kristian Price Pérez; August 26, 1984) is an American musician, singer and record producer. He has released three albums to date as a solo artist, including Homesick in 2012, Stop Talking in 2017, and Dalmatian, which was released on March 2, 2018. He is also known as the producer of the 2014 album The Soul of All Natural Things by Linda Perhacs and as the producer of the 2016 album Rainbow Ends by Emitt Rhodes. Price is also a member of the bands Taylor Locke and the Roughs and Bebopalula.

== Early life ==
Price was born Kristian Price Pérez in Miami, Florida, the son of Betsy Pérez (née Betson, b. 1963, Lansdowne, Pennsylvania) and Grammy Award winning record producer and songwriter Rudy Pérez (b. 1958, Pinar Del Rio, Cuba). He has three younger brothers, Michael, Corey and Adam, and a half sister named Jennifer. Price attended Miami Beach Senior High School in Miami Beach, Florida, where he came under the tutelage of music instructor Doug Burris. Price participated in Burris' Miami Beach Rock Ensemble in high school, where he formed musical partnerships with other students Roger Houdaille and Fernando Perdomo. The three started a band called Dreaming in Stereo and released one EP locally in 2005 before disbanding. Price and Houdaille went on to form the popular local band Monkeypox, which released 3 albums, several non-album singles and a feature-length film in 2005 before breaking up. Price then began writing and performing songs with his brothers Michael and Corey under the band name Price.

== Career ==
=== Price (2006–2009) ===
In 2006, the band Price, which consisted of brothers Chris, Michael & Corey and drummer Alex Ibanez, was signed to Geffen Records and the three brothers relocated to Los Angeles. Price wrote and recorded two songs for feature films. The song "Hey Nancy Drew" was featured on the soundtrack of the 2007 film Nancy Drew, and the song "Something in Your Eyes" was featured in the film Blonde Ambition. The band showcased at the 2007 South by Southwest Music Conference to an enthusiastic response. In 2008, following the departure of Ibanez and the introduction of new drummer Charles Streeter, Price went into the studio with producer Tony Berg and recorded a full-length album. The album was ultimately not released and Price parted ways with Geffen Records in 2009 before going on an extended hiatus.

=== Taylor Locke and the Roughs (2010–2012) ===
In 2009, Price began collaborating on songs with Rooney guitarist Taylor Locke. Their songwriting sessions led to the formation of a band called Taylor Locke & the Roughs. Price and Locke co-wrote and co-produced two albums under the Roughs moniker in 2010. The album Grain & Grape was featured on several Best Albums of 2010 lists, including an Album of the Year mention by the power pop blog Powerpopaholic. After the release of their second album, Marathon, the band did extensive touring in 2011, opening for the Canadian rock band Sloan on the East coast and in Canada, as well as a headlining tour on the West coast. In 2012, they released a live album, Live at Rosalita's, and completed work on a third album called Parallel Lines that has yet to be released.

=== Homesick (2012) ===
Price began work on a solo album in 2011. Upon purchasing his first IPhone, Price was struck by the sonic quality of the phone's mic and decided to attempt to record an entire album using nothing but the mic of the phone and an app called 4Tracks which simulates the recording process of an analog 4-track Tape machine. The resulting album, Homesick, was released in 2012. Lead single "That's Your Boyfriend" was chosen as iTunes Single of the Week in May 2012 and the album received a 4-star review from the New York Daily News.

=== Linda Perhacs - The Soul of All Natural Things (2013–2014) ===
Price and his former Dreaming in Stereo bandmate Fernando Perdomo worked together to co-produce an album for Linda Perhacs entitled The Soul of All Natural Things. It was Perhacs' first album in 44 years. The album was released on March 4, 2014 by Asthmatic Kitty. AllMusic gave the album 4 out of 5 stars, and Thom Jurek's review states: "The Soul of All Natural Things does stand on its own in terms of quality, but is unmistakably an extension of the sonic, spiritual continuum Perhacs' began – and probably thought she left – on Parallelograms. Her uncommon, even singular approach to singing, recording, and writing, remains fully in evidence here." In The New York Times' favorable review, Jon Pareles said of Price and Perdomo's production: "They keep the music sounding largely organic without making the album a slavish period piece."

=== Emitt Rhodes (2013–2016) ===
Power pop artist Emitt Rhodes began collaborating with Price on a new album in 2013, which would be his first album since 1973's "Farewell To Paradise". The forthcoming album features contributions from Jellyfish members Roger Joseph Manning, Jr. and Jason Falkner, along with Taylor Locke, Joseph Seiders and Fernando Perdomo. It is set for release on February 26, 2016. In the July 2015 issue of MOJO Magazine, Rhodes is quoted as saying: "It was remarkable. It had all the energy that I had lost about 20 years ago. It's brilliant fucking shit, and Chris is a fucking genius." On Record Store Day 2015, Price and Rhodes released a vinyl single together to promote an upcoming Bee Gees tribute album. The A-side, produced by Price, is Rhodes' cover of "How Can You Mend A Broken Heart", and the B-side is Price's version of "Please Read Me". On November 21, 2015, The Wall Street Journal's blog Speakeasy premiered the first single from Rhodes' new album Rainbow Ends, produced by Price. The song "Dog on a Chain" features vocal harmonies by Aimee Mann and a guitar solo by Jon Brion. The album was released by Omnivore Recordings.

=== Stop Talking (2017) ===
On March 24, 2017 it was announced that Price's 5-years-in-the-making follow up to Homesick, entitled Stop Talking, would be released by Omnivore Recordings on May 19. The album features 14 tracks and was entirely produced, engineered and mixed by Price himself. A trailer was also released that previewed a handful of songs and indicated the album would be released in limited quantities on vinyl exclusively at independent record stores. In advance of the release date, three songs premiered, entitled "Stop Talking", "Hi Lo" and "Man Down".

In 2025, Uncut magazine included Stop Talking in their list of the 500 best albums of the 2010s to Now.

=== Linda Perhacs - I'm a Harmony (2017) ===
On September 22, 2017, Perhacs released her third album I'm a Harmony on the Omnivore Recordings label. The album was produced by Pat Sansone of Wilco alongside Perhacs and Fernando Perdomo. Price wrote 4 songs on the album, including the title track which developed out of an informal jam between Price and Julia Holter.

=== Jeffrey Gaines (2018) ===
It was announced on November 20, 2017 that Price had produced a new album for Jeffrey Gaines entitled Alright. The album, which was released on January 26, 2018, has 10 songs all produced, engineered and mixed by Price and features the band Jackshit (Val McCallum, Davey Faragher and Pete Thomas) on all songs. The album was recorded live in the studio in three days.

=== Dalmatian (2018) ===
On March 2, 2018, Omnivore Recordings released the third studio album by Chris Price, Dalmatian. The album features 13 tracks written, produced, engineered and mixed by Price himself and includes songs that were compiled during the same sessions as the previous Price album Stop Talking.

=== Roger Joseph Manning Jr - Glamping (2018) ===
Former Jellyfish member Roger Joseph Manning, Jr. released his first new solo material since 2008's Catnip Dynamite on May 18, 2018. The EP, entitled Glamping, featured 4 new songs, 3 of which, "Operator", "Is It All a Dream?" and "I'm Not Your Cowboy" feature Price as a co-writer. More music from these sessions was expected to be released, according to interviews with Manning.

=== Alex Jules - Topiary (2019) ===
The debut album by Alex Jules, Topiary, was released on March 8, 2019. Produced, engineered and mixed by Price, the album marks the first time all Bebopalula band members (Price & Jules along with Emeen Zarookian and Ben Lecourt) worked in a studio together on an album. Topiary also features Fernando Perdomo, Kyle Fredrickson, Kaitlin Wolfberg, Corey Perez and Matt Fish as guest musicians.

=== Val McCallum - Chateauguay (2019) ===
On March 15, 2019, guitarist Val McCallum self-released a new album produced and mixed by Price entitled Chateauguay. McCallum's second solo album features Price, Davey Faragher, Joe Seiders, Shelby Lynne, Z Berg and Pete Thomas.

== Discography ==
=== Solo ===
- Homesick (2012)
- "How Can You Mend a Broken Heart"/"Please Read Me" with Emitt Rhodes (single) (2015)
- Stop Talking (2017)
- Dalmatian (2018)
- "I Won't Last a Day Without You" (single) (from White Lace and Promises: The Songs of Paul Williams) (2018)

=== with Price ===
- "Hey Nancy Drew" (from the film Nancy Drew) (2007)
- "Something in Your Eyes" (from the film Blonde Ambition) (2008)
- "I Don't Want a Thing This Christmas" (single) (2009)
- Unreleased album (produced by Tony Berg) (2009)

=== with Taylor Locke and the Roughs ===
- Grain & Grape (2010)
- Marathon (2010)
- Live at Rosalita's (2012)

=== with Monkeypox ===
- Ahhh! Monkeypox (2005)
- Hey! That's My Wife! Get Your Own! (2005)
- We Are Monkeypox (2005)
- In Limbo – Original Soundtrack (2005)
- "For Lovers Only/Surfin' Surfside" (single) (2005)
- "No Hellos/Painted Chariot" (single) (2005)
- Maurier Debbouze – Rock and Roll: The Album (2006)

=== As producer ===
- Chloe Lear – Girl Interrupted (2011)
- Victoria Sole – Al Otro Lado De Mi Atmosfera (2013)
- Jacquelyn – The Kiss (2013)
- Linda Perhacs – The Soul of All Natural Things (2014) (co-wrote "The Soul of All Natural Things", "Children", "River of God", "Freely", "Immunity" and "When Things Are True Again")
- Shay Astar – Land of Wandering (2014)
- Tyler Peterson – Power of a Country Song (2015)
- Ana Cristina - The West Coast Sessions (2015)
- Jacquelyn - And So It Goes (2016)
- Emitt Rhodes – Rainbow Ends (2016) (co-wrote "Someone Else")
- Bebopalula - EP (2016)
- Jeffrey Gaines - Alright (2018)
- Alex Jules - Topiary (2019)
- Val McCallum - Chateauguay (2019)
- Gerry Cea - Something New (2019)

=== Appearances as musician ===
- Linda Perhacs - I'm a Harmony (co-wrote "I'm a Harmony", "Winds of the Sky", "We Will Live" and "Eclipse of All Love")
- Taylor Locke – Time Stands Still (co-wrote "No Dice", "Call Me Kuchu" and "So Long")
- Roger Joseph Manning, Jr. – Glamping (co-wrote "Operator", "Is It All a Dream" and "I'm Not Your Cowboy")
- Bleu – Four
- Low – C'mon
- Christina Aguilera – "Pero Me Acuerdo de Ti"
- Ex Norwegian - Pure Gold
- Luis Fonsi – "Imagíname Sin Ti"
- Jencarlos – "Nadie Como Yo"
- Los Temerarios - "Mi Vida Sin Ti"
- Jim Camacho – Beachfront Defeat
- Jim Camacho – Fools Paradise (songbook)
- Father Bloopy – Ginger, Baby
- The BJ Experience – If You Call Me I'm Ready to Party
- Jerrod's Door – 2003 album
- Sabrina Barnett – Set Me Free
- Jacobs Ladder – EP
- Dreaming in Stereo – EP
