= Scene in San Francisco =

Single by Ed Hale

from the album Ballad On Third Avenue
- Released: January 17, 2012
- Recorded: 2009, 2011
- Length: 3:54
- Label: Dying Van Gogh Records
- Songwriters: Ed Hale, William Sommer
- Producers: Ed Hale, Fernando Perdomo

Ed Hale singles chronology
"New Orleans Dreams" (2011)	"Scene in San Francisco" (2012)

"Scene In San Francisco" is a song by the American singer-songwriter Ed Hale. It was released on January 17, 2012, as the third single from his solo album, Ballad On Third Avenue. The song was written by Ed Hale and the drummer of Ed Hale and The Transcendence, William Sommer and produced by Ed Hale and Fernando Perdomo.

== Track listing ==
Digital download

1. "Scene in San Francisco" – 3:54

== Charts ==
Chart (2012)	Peak position
US Adult Contemporary (Billboard)	25

== Release history ==
Country	Date	Format	Label
United States	January 17, 2012	Digital download	Dying Van Gogh Records
