= Stop Talking (Chris Price album) =

Studio album by Chris Price
- Released: May 19, 2017
- Genres: Indie pop, rock
- Length: 40:17
- Label: Omnivore Recordings
- Producer: Chris Price

Chris Price chronology
Homesick (2012)	Stop Talking (2017)	Dalmatian (2018)

Professional ratings
Review scores
Source	Rating
AllMusic	3.5/5 stars
Paste	8.8/10
UNCUT	8/10

Stop Talking is the second studio album by Chris Price. It was released on May 19, 2017 by Omnivore Recordings. The album was produced, engineered and mixed by Price himself, and was recorded over a five-year period, starting immediately after the release of Price's debut LP, Homesick. Price reportedly recorded nearly 50 songs during this time, while also devoting time to produce albums for Linda Perhacs in 2014 and Emitt Rhodes in 2016. Leftover material from those productive recording sessions would contribute to Price's third album, Dalmatian, which would release within a year. The album's cover, a painting of a blue dog, was painted by Andrew Scott.

== Reception ==
The album has received positive reviews. Paste, in an 8.8 out of 10 review says "With Stop Talking, [Price] pushes further, reinvigorating the entire singer-songwriter idiom for the 21st century." UNCUT Magazine awarded an 8 out of 10 score, and called the album "a breathtaking aerial ballet from a gifted young artist/producer". The Los Angeles Times gave a positive review, writing "Price is admired in the power pop community, an oft-insular world that lives and dies on catchy hooks and earworm-worthy melodies. But Price’s brand of stickiness is less rigid and more pessimistic, and recalls the music of songwriters including Alex Chilton, Gene Clark and Aimee Mann, none of whom ever shied away from hard emotion." Writing for Coachella Valley Weekly, Eleni P. Austin says, "Back in 1968, John Lennon and Paul McCartney were at a press conference to announce the formation of Apple Corps. Famously, they each named Harry Nilsson as their 'favorite American singer and group.' Nearly 50 years on, if they could answer that question today, there could only be one correct reply, Chris Price. Stop Talking is a masterpiece from start to finish." In an 8 out of 10 review for Powerpopaholic, Aaron Kupferberg writes, "Chris Price's Stop Talking is mostly about pain and loss, but told with an elegance and beauty that’s impossible to ignore. The vignettes of each song reveal something disturbing under the surface of each catchy melody." AllMusic gave a three and a half star review, saying "The subject matter can occasionally get heavy -- mental health, grief, and heartache all make themselves known -- but such is the singer/songwriter's milieu, and besides, there's enough Fab Four bubbling up beneath it all to keep things effervescent, even when the tales themselves break bad."

Stop Talking appeared on several year-end lists of the best albums of 2017, including a placement on the Los Angeles Times' list "California Sounds: the 30 essential Los Angeles records of 2017" in which Randall Roberts wrote, "The genre-obsessed might call this magnetic, introspective work a power-pop album, filled as it is with guitar-driven hooks and Beatles-circa-1966 inspiration. But to these ears it’s merely a great rock album, one that has been criminally overlooked on most year-end polls." The album was also cited by KCRW DJ Gary Calamar, Powerpopaholic, PowerPopSquare, BuzzBands.la, 89.5 WPKN DJ Eric Cocks, the Play Me Some Of That! podcast, Eleni P. Austin of Coachella Valley Weekly and Pop Fair, among others.

== Track listing ==
All tracks are written by Chris Price except where noted.

No.	Title	Length
1.	"Stop Talking"	3:17
2.	"Hi Lo"	2:49
3.	"Pulling Teeth"	3:20
4.	"Man Down"	3:53
5.	"Father to the Man"	2:51
6.	"Once Was True"	2:07
7.	"You and Me (And Everyone Else)" (Chris Price, Joe Seiders)	2:39
8.	"Algebra in the Sky"	3:13
9.	"Sigh" (Chris Price, Corey Perez, Rick Moon)	3:50
10.	"Darkness" (Chris Price, Adam Perez)	2:57
11.	"Contrition"	2:06
12.	"One of Them" (Chris Price, Rachel Goodrich)	2:59
13.	"Just in Time"	1:39
14.	"Anhedonia"	2:37

== Personnel ==
- Chris Price - Producer, Engineer, Mixing, Composer, Vocals, Guitar (Acoustic), Guitar (Electric), Bass, Piano, Organ, Pianet, Farfisa, Synths, Programming, Loops, Mellotron, Sound Effects, Percussion
- Ben Lecourt - Drums, Percussion
- Kaitlin Wolfberg - Violin, Viola, String Arrangements
- Matt Fish - Cello, Upright Bass
- Fernando Perdomo - Bass (on "Stop Talking", "Hi Lo" and "Man Down"), Additional Engineering
- Emeen Zarookian - Electric Guitar (on "Man Down" and "Algebra In The Sky"), Tambourine (on "One Of Them"), Additional Engineering
- Joe Seiders - Piano (on "You And Me")
- Corinne Olsen - Violin, Viola (on "Pulling Teeth" and "Once Was True")
- Kyle Fredrickson - Electric Guitar (on "Stop Talking", "Hi Lo" and "Once Was True")
- Adam Perez - Drums (on "Darkness")
- Nadeem Majdalany - String Arrangements (on "Pulling Teeth" and "Once Was True")
- Corey Perez - Bass (on "Algebra In The Sky")
- Alex Jules - Tambourine (on "One Of Them")
