= Third (Cait Brennan album) =

Studio album by Cait Brennan
- Released: April 21, 2017
- Recorded: December 2–4, 2016
- Genres: Indie rock, glam rock, soul
- Length: 44:45
- Label: Omnivore/Alternative Distribution Alliance
- Producers: Cait Brennan and Fernando Perdomo

Cait Brennan chronology
Debutante (2016)	Third (2017)	Introducing The Breakdown According To Cait Brennan (2018)

Third is the second studio album by Cait Brennan, released by Omnivore on April 21, 2017. The follow-up to 2016's critically lauded Debutante, Third was recorded at Ardent Studios in Memphis, in the same studio and using many of the same instruments Big Star used during its Ardent heyday in the early 1970s.

The album was co-produced and performed entirely by Brennan and Fernando Perdomo. The duo produced Brennan's 2016 debut 'Debutante', as well as an unreleased second album and a set of demos for Sire Records founder Seymour Stein before ultimately signing with Omnivore Recordings in January 2017.

== Background and recording ==
During the recording of Brennan's Sire Records demo sessions, Brennan and Perdomo attended a presentation at the Grammy Museum at L.A. Live, celebrating the 50th Anniversary of Ardent Studios. At the event, Brennan and Perdomo encountered Big Star drummer and Ardent president Jody Stephens, who invited the pair to record their next album at Ardent. When the Sire deal did not materialize, the duo traveled to Memphis and recorded 13 songs in three days. During the sessions, the pair used many of the same instruments and amplifiers used by Big Star during their heyday, including Alex Chilton's Hiwatt amps, Mellotron and Chris Bell's cherry red Gibson guitar. As with Brennan's debut album Debutante, Brennan and Perdomo played all of the instruments, with the exception of two guest appearances by longtime Memphis power pop musician Van Duren and former Continental Drifters guitarist Robert Mache. The album was engineered by Ardent staff producer/engineer Adam Hill, and mastered by Grammy-winning audio engineer Michael Graves. Omnivore's Cheryl Pawelski had been a longtime fan of Brennan's work, as well as having an extensive history with Ardent and Big Star; Pawelski signed Brennan to Omnivore in January 2017, slating Brennan's Third for a late April 2017 release to coincide with Record Store Day.

== Composition ==
"When someone has suffered violence simply for being who they are, there's an urgency to the lyrics “Kinda tried to hide it, but I never denied it.” Cait Brennan sings these words, and everything else on her new album, Third, as if her life depended on it. Not that she can't reveal a light touch, as when she sings, “he knows too much, I think we'll have to kill him.” If the latter is built on a bedrock of T. Rex hand claps and chugging electric guitars, mixing the lighthearted with the murderous, that just comes with the territory."

— Alex Greene, Memphis Flyer

Brennan composed the majority of the songs on Third in November and December 2016, during the final days of a particularly painful romantic breakup. "There was a pretty intense romantic relationship involved," Brennan told Popdose writer Keith Creighton. "Maybe romantic isn’t the right word, but I fell head over heels in love with the boy in question. I wish I could tell you that was mutual, but the songs would rat me out...I think above all else, that’s what changed me the most, and what drove the creation of Third." Many of the songs were in unfinished or fragmented form when Brennan and Perdomo arrived at Ardent, and sections were hastily written in the studio during the sessions, often just moments before Brennan sang them. Memphis singer-songwriter Van Duren, whose long association with Ardent dates back to auditioning for Big Star in the 1970s, and had played extensively with Jody Stephens and Chris Bell, provided a key chord change on "Shake Away", and plays guitar on the track. Two songs from the album were partly or wholly recorded prior to the Ardent sessions; "Goodbye Missamerica" was a spontaneously improvised home demo recording dating from 2011, enhanced with drums and Mellotron at Ardent, while "LA/Amsterdam" was taken from the completed sessions for Brennan's unreleased second album.

== Promotion and tour ==
Brennan and Perdomo embarked on a series of full-band release shows and promotional appearances, beginning with a sold-out show at Molly Malone's in Los Angeles. The pair returned to Memphis in early May 2017 for televised performances on WREG-TV, radio interviews, and a release show at Bar DKDC in the Cooper-Young, which included a surprise performance of Chris Bell's "I Am The Cosmos" with Jody Stephens on drums, Van Duren on guitar, and Brennan singing Bell's vocal. While in Memphis, Brennan and Perdomo returned to Ardent for three days of additional recording for Introducing The Breakdown According To Cait Brennan as well as tracking for Perdomo's 2017 album The Golden Hour. Additional tour dates continued throughout 2017.

== Title ==
Although Third was Brennan's second official release, it was the third album she recorded, after temporarily shelving the unreleased Introducing The Breakdown According To Cait Brennan, which is due in 2018. The title "Third" refers in part to the swapped release order, as well as being a nod to Big Star's Third, which was recorded in the same studio on much of the same gear. However, Brennan has suggested that the title refers to neither of those things, but instead refers to the ill-fated polyamorous relationship she was in at the time, which inspired many of the songs.

== Critical reception ==
Third received generally positive reviews from critics. AllMusic senior editor Stephen Thomas Erlewine ranked Third 42nd on his list of the 100 best albums of 2017. LA Weekly's Jackson Truax described her as a "Renaissance woman of indie rock" and said "Third is a subversive glam-rock masterpiece...It’s a pleasure to hear a new album that wears its David Bowie, Velvet Underground, Big Star and Queen influences so boldly on its sleeve while still serving as its own original, satisfying statement." No Depression addressed the high expectations Brennan faced after the critical acclaim she received from her debut album Debutante, saying "Since this is technically her third album, it’s ineligible for a sophomore slump. And slump this is not. ‘Ascent’ is more apt. Together with creative partner Fernando Perdomo, Brennan combines the best of ‘70s pop - Nilsson, Bowie, Todd Rundgren, Emitt Rhodes, Sparks, Raspberries, ELO - with the snap of Prince’s ‘80s funk. Perdomo plays most of the instruments and Brennan provides all of the vocals, but it sounds like an ensemble rather than a construct. With tracking laid down in only three days, the productions are full of early-take life that’s magnified by canny overdubs of guitar, mellotron and other atmospheric touches. This has the energy of a live set and the finesse of a crafted studio product...Those new to Brennan should prepare to be dazzled; fans should prepare to be dazzled anew." Writing in The Advocate, Jacob Anderson-Minshall described Brennan as "rock's next big thing" and praised the album and her journey "from actress to filmmaker to critically acclaimed rock goddess."

Spectrum Culture's Grant Lindner offered a somewhat contrasting view, praising Brennan as "a fascinating vocalist who is seemingly at war with trite lyrics and musical tropes. Her voice is rich and captivating, a throwback to the days of glam rock with an unmistakable David Bowie influence. She could easily carve out an evergreen niche churning out droll power pop, but on her second album Third, she expands into other genre influences and challenges herself as a lyricist to bring a sense of specificity to every bar. She doesn’t always succeed, but the joy of the album is hearing her try and feeling the record’s growing pains." Lindner praised the album's immediacy and melodic hooks, but panned the album's length, saying "Those who prize character above all else in their music will likely find Brennan compelling enough for 13 tracks, but the rest of us should hope that her relentless experimentation on Third helps her find a genre comfort zone that can work for her to create the truly great record she seems capable of producing."

=== Year-end lists ===
Publication	List	Year	Rank	Ref.
Medium	Stephen Thomas Erlewine's 100 Best Albums of 2017	2017	42	
Goldmine	25 Best Albums of 2017	2017	6	
WFMU	Evan "Funk" Davies' Best Albums of 2017	2017	5	
Phoenix New Times	Best Things We Heard In 2017	2017	6	
Pause And Play	10 Best Albums of 2017	2017	6	
Popdose	Best of 2017	2017	5	
Pure Pop	Stars of 2017	2017	9	
WPKN	WPKN's Favourite Songs of 2017	2017	3	
I Don't Hear A Single	Albums of the Year 2017	2017	11	

== Track listing ==
Third – Standard edition
No.	Title	Writer(s)	Producer(s)	Length
1.	"Bad At Apologies"	Cait Brennan	Cait Brennan, Fernando Perdomo	3:45
2.	"Stack Overflow"	Brennan	Brennan, Perdomo	3:03
3.	"He Knows Too Much"	Brennan	Brennan, Perdomo	3:48
4.	"At The End Of The World"	Brennan	Brennan, Perdomo	4:26
5.	"A Hard Man To Love"	Brennan, Perdomo	Brennan, Perdomo	4:21
6.	"Caitiebots Don't Cry"	Brennan	Brennan, Perdomo	5:40
7.	"Benedict Cumberbatch"	Brennan	Brennan, Perdomo	3:17
8.	"Shake Away"	Cait Brennan; Fernando Perdomo; Van Duren	Brennan, Perdomo	3:55
9.	"The Angels Lie"	Brennan	Brennan, Perdomo	3:35
10.	"Collapse"	Brennan	Brennan, Perdomo	3:34
11.	"LA/Amsterdam"	Brennan	Brennan, Perdomo	5:05
12.	"Perish The Thought"	Brennan	Brennan, Perdomo	4:04
13.	"Goodbye Missamerica"	Brennan	Brennan, Perdomo	4:21
Total length:				52:45

== Personnel ==
Adapted from the album liner notes.

- Cait Brennan – producer, programming, synths (tracks: 4, 8, 11, 13); guitar (tracks 10–11); piano (track 13); lead and backing vocals (all tracks), mixing
- Fernando Perdomo – producer, lead guitar, bass, drums, percussion, Mellotron (tracks: 4–5, 7, 11, 13); backing vocals (track 2), mixing
- Adam Hill – engineer
- Greg Allen – photography, package design
- Cait Brennan – cover photo, cover package design
- Robert Mache – lead guitar (track 10)
- Van Duren – guitar (track 8)
- Michael Graves – mastering
- Glenn Schwartz – licensing
- Addison Hare – project assistance (Ardent Studios)
- Wendy Parks – project assistance (Space 67 Studios)
- Cheryl Pawelski – A&R (Omnivore Recordings)
