= Ed Hale =

American singer-songwriter

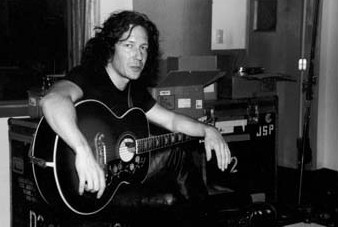
- in the recording studio

Background information
- Also known as: Eddie Darling
- Born: October 20, 1974 (age 51); Paris, France
- Genres: Power pop, modern rock, world music
- Occupations: Singer-songwriter, musician, record producer, peace activist, entrepreneur, writer
- Instruments: Vocals, guitar, piano, bass
- Label: Dying Van Gogh Records
- Website: Official website

Ed Hale (born October 20, 1974) is an American writer, singer-songwriter-recording artist. His hit singles include "I Walk Alone", "New Orleans Dreams" and "Scene in San Francisco", which all landed in the Billboard Top 40 Charts in the Adult Contemporary radio format.

Hale was formerly known as Eddie Darling throughout the early 1990s, and is the lead singer of the American modern rock musical group Ed Hale and The Transcendence, formerly called Transcendence. He also performs, records and releases solo albums. He is currently signed to the Dying Van Gogh record label and the BMG subsidiary label Fieldhouse Music. Hale is frequently referred to as "The Ambassador" by fans and the press due to Hale's penchant for global volunteer and diplomatic travel, exploring other cultures, and for singing in and speaking multiple languages. Along with his native English, Hale speaks Spanish, Portuguese, Italian, French, Hebrew and Persian.

== Early life ==
Hale is a second generation American who is half English and half Italian. He was born in Paris, France, while his father was serving in the military. Hale started playing piano on his own at age four, allegedly inspired by seeing the film Sound of Music. Hale comes from a long line of musicians including his great uncle, the Sands Hotel bandleader, producer and arranger Antonio Morelli. However, it has been reported that Hale got his start in music after his mother spoke with psychic Micki Dahne who recommended that she buy her creative yet troubled son a guitar in order to "keep him out of trouble, out of jail, and alive long enough to see his eighteenth birthday".

== Music career ==
Hale released his first album, Eddie, at the age of 17 on the Alarming Talent record label under the moniker Eddie Darling. He was discovered while still in high school by author and talent agent Murray Silver who penned the book Great Balls of Fire – The Jerry Lee Lewis Story and produced the Eddie album. Hale's first professional live concert performance was opening for the band R.E.M. at the Fox Theatre in Atlanta, Georgia in front of 5,000 people. It was after this that Hale formed the band Broken Spectacles.

Broken Spectacles – formed with childhood friend Matthew Sabatella, got their name from the cover of the Yoko Ono album Season of Glass, which featured a photo of the shattered and blood-stained glasses of slain Beatle's singer John Lennon. The band's debut album was engineered and produced by audio engineer and producer Brendan O'Brien. A failed attempt by Peter Gabriel drummer Jerry Marotta to produce the band's second album produced mixed results and was never completed, though Hale has stated that working with Marotta was one of the most important and influential experiences in his musical career.

After the breakup of Broken Spectacles, Hale toured the East Coast as a solo artist and ended up moving to New York City. While there he recorded 12 demos for Sony Records which were never officially released by the record label. Ten of those demos were eventually remixed and digitally remastered and released on the Acoustic in New York album in 2000. It was also at this time that Hale began to discover World Music, especially the MPB and Tropicalismo music of Brazil and went to live in Brazil to study the language of Portuguese and learn how to play Bossa Nova, doing several live performances and appearing on Brazilian television.

The original name for Ed Hale's second group was Ed Hale and The Troubadours of Transcendence. The name was shortened to Ed Hale and Transcendence for the band's debut album Rise and Shine released in 2002, and eventually shortened to simply Transcendence by the band's second album release Sleep With You. The group originally had eleven members and was meant to be performing and recording what Hale was then calling "Planet Music."

Ed Hale and Transcendence first caught national attention by combining World Music themes with an eccentric modern rock that they called "planet music." Hale's consciousness raising lyrics and the fact that he sang in no less than five languages on the band's debut album Rise and Shine – sometimes within the same song – also added to the group's unique appeal. The song Better Luck Next Time from that album is still played on college and rock radio in the United States and Europe.

Their second album, an extreme stylistic departure from their first album, the alt rock Sleep With You, became the group's biggest seller and reached #24 on the Billboard Rock Specialty Show Charts and yielded two hits for the band – Superhero Girl and Girls The band were invited to tour Europe in 2003, and have released six albums in the last ten years: including Rise and Shine, Sleep With You and Nothing Is Cohesive (2004). In 2008 they released the b-sides and rarities album The City of Lost Children. In 2011 they released the rock opera album entitled All Your Heroes Become Villains, again to critical acclaim. which they followed up with another album recorded during the same sessions for the All Your Heroes... album, the garage-pop rocker entitled The Great Mistake, which was originally held up by ever increasing problems in the music industry, specifically with the group's distribution company. Dying Van Gogh Records eventually released the new album in November 2012 under the artist name Ed Hale and the Transcendence. The album debuted in the #12 slot on the CMJ Top 20 Most Added Chart in its first week and went on to yield three moderate hit songs, the opening track "ManChildWoman"—which was used in the Showtime series Shameless, "Monday" and "Babybop". Songs by Ed Hale and Transcendence meanwhile are often heard on a variety of television shows on major and cable networks including VH1 and MTV and in many films.

In July 2010 Hale released his first solo album in almost ten years Ballad On Third Avenue receiving both critical acclaim and the greatest commercial success of his musical career thus far. The album debuted on college radio's CMJ Most Added Chart at #14 in its first week and peaked at #139 on the CMJ Top 200 Chart where it stayed for six months. The album also garnered Hale further radio success, this time in two new formats for the artist, Hot AC and Triple A, with the first single from the album I Walk Alone, the second single New Orleans Dreams which peaked at #10 on the Adult Contemporary Charts, and Scene in San Francisco, which peaked in the Billboard Adult Contemporary Top 40 at #24. Hale toured both the East and West Coast of the United States in 2009 and 2010 performing at several International Pop Overthrow Festivals in various cities from Boston to Los Angeles to Vancouver in Canada. The band also performed at rock music festival and conference Sunset Sessions in the summer of 2013.

Hale returned to the recording studio in New York and Seattle, WA to record a follow-up album, this time with Ex Norwegian front-man Roger Houdaille in the producer's seat. These sessions eventually morphed into three very stylistically different new albums scheduled for release in 2016,So For Real, Born To Lose, and Another Day in the Apocalypse. Dying Van Gogh Records also announced plans to release two deluxe boxed archive collections of older material from Hale's early days as a recording artist, Spectacularly Broken a two-disc set of nearly everything Hale recorded during his tenure with the band Broken Spectacles digitally remastered; and Goodbye Eddie Darling a collection of home demo recordings that were recently discovered from the same period.

== Activism ==
Hale is the nephew of feminist activist, political analyst, lobbyist, and grassroots organizer Eleanor Smeal, who served as the two-term president of the National Organization for Women in the 1980s. In 2003 Hale set up an alternative media headquarters in Miami to house activists and demonstrators to protest and oppose the Free Trade of the Americas FTAA meetings that were being held in the city.

In 2006 Hale endeavored on a two-week work-trip to build homes and tour the slave castles in Ghana, Africa — which was filmed and posted to YouTube in a series of ten-minute episodes entitled "Going to Ghana", an experience which had a major emotional impact on the singer, leading to his penning the song "Black Brother" from the forthcoming album Another Day in the Apocalypse. In 2008 Hale embarked on a controversial Peace Delegation trip to the country of Iran with The Fellowship of Reconciliation (FOR) where he and 11 other Americans, including Rolling Stone contributing editor Robert Dreyfuss and the author Larry Beinhart met with leading government officials including former President Mohammad Khatami and leading religious clerics to discuss ways to improve US/Iranian relations and increase peace between the two countries.

A few months later, Hale appeared at the 2008 United Nations General Assembly Meeting in New York City to attend a private conference with Iran president Mahmoud Ahmadinejad and other leading figures of the US peace movement.

In the summer of 2013, Hale participated in a similar two-week fact-finding and peace delegation trip to Israel and Palestine with the Interfaith Peace-Builders organization.

Hale has also founded and chairs a handful of non-profit projects, including Fair Pay for Fair Play which focuses on legislation to gain fair compensation for music artists, the website Tune In Turn On Help which funnels attention and monies to various causes and charities, and Peace With Iran, a website that attempts to act as a vehicle for journalists and alternative press coverage of Iran, and to expose more Westerners to the Iranian culture. Hale made two volunteer trips to the post-Hurricane Katrina Gulf Coast helping to rebuild homes in 2006, and in 2009 he took two more volunteer trips to a remote village outside of the city Cartagena in the country of Colombia to help build a Community and Health Center there. Hale also works locally with the New York City Mission Society volunteering with underprivileged children from the Bronx and Harlem and volunteers with a local Food Bank, Covenant House, Big Brothers Big Sisters of America, and is a Red Cross Disaster Relief volunteer.

== Business, professional, and entrepreneurial career ==
Hale has founded several companies in various industries, including a recording studio, The Garden of Eden health food store, and the vitamin manufacturing company Ageless Foundation Laboratories which was sold to the Naturade company in 2005. Interested in life extension and anti-aging sciences, Hale developed a nutritional formula called UltraMax-HGH, eventually becoming UltraMax-Gold, and a full line of similar products which were the basis of the Ageless Foundation company.

Hale was interviewed in Health Industry related magazines and journals about anti-aging and business during this time when active in the industry. He also hosted The Now Age Radio Show (WWNN) for two years which featured guests in the field of health and longevity sciences such as Dr. Ray Sahelian and Durk Pearson and Sandy Shaw. The products he developed brought the controversial nutrient HGH mass market exposure. Hale is also active in real estate investment with The Hale Daniel Corporation, a Florida company. He founded and presides over the multi-media company Transcendent Media Group Inc. – which acts as a record company that is home to artists of various musical styles from Rock to Americana to hip hop, a web design firm, and a television production company. Hale also owns a clothing line which specializes in rock 'n' roll T-shirts. Hale refers to his various forays into business as a hobby and another outlet to express his creativity.

== Discography ==
=== Solo albums ===
Studio albums

- Eddie (1990)
- Spectacularly Broken (1995)
- Acoustic in New York (1997)
- Ballad on Third Avenue (2009)
- So For Real (2018)
- Born To Lose (2018)
- Another Day in the Apocalypse (2019)
- Welcome to the Rest of the World (2019)
- Heal World (2020)

Singles

- "She Says You're The One" (1990)
- "You And Me" (1990)
- "And It's You" (1990)
- "I Walk Alone" (2009)
- "New Orleans Dreams" (2011)
- "Scene in San Francisco" (2012)
- "Tell You True" (2016)
- "Summer Flowers" (2016)
- "The Prince of New York" (2018)
- "Gimme Some Rock'n'Roll" (2018)
- "Born to Lose" (2018)
- "Gimme Some Rock 'n' Roll" (2016)
- "Another Day in the Apocalypse" (2016)
- "Black Brother" (2016)
- "Heal World" (2020)

=== Ed Hale and The Transcendence ===
Studio albums

- Rise and Shine (2002)
- Sleep With You (2003)
- Nothing Is Cohesive (2004)
- All Your Heroes Become Villains (2011)
- The Great Mistake (2012)

Compilations

- The City of Lost Children: Rare and Unreleased Tracks (2008)

EPs

- The Journey: Remix EP (2002)
- The Girls EP (2003)

Singles

- "Better Luck Next Time" (2002)
- "Veronica" (2003)
- "Superhero Girl" (2003)
- "Girls" (2003)
- "I'm Not The Only One" (2003)
- "Somebody Killed The DJ" (2005)
- "All This Is Beginning to Feel Like an Ending" (2005)
- "Caetano" (2005)
- "Blind Eye" (2011)
- "Solaris" (2012)
- "Messed it Up Again" (2012)
- "ManChildWoman" (2013)
- "Monday" (2013)
- "Baby Bop" (2013)

== Personal life ==
In 2010 Hale married Nahal Mishel-Ghashghai who he has two daughters with. Hale converted to Islam and took the Muslim name of Haafez in order to marry Mishel-Ghashghai, in a Persian ceremony. She reciprocated by converting to Christianity in order to marry Hale in a Christian ceremony. The singer is candidly open about his Christian faith in interviews and writes about the subject often in his blog The Transcendence Diaries.
