= Upper Hand =

Upper Hand or The Upper Hand may refer to:

== Books ==
- The Upper Hand, by Stuart Hood 1987.
- The Upper Hand, by John William Corrington 1967

== Film and TV ==
- The Upper Hand (TV series) a British television sitcom 1990–1996 with Joe McGann, Diana Weston, Honor Blackman
- The Upper Hand (film) (French : Du rififi à Paname) 1966 Jean Gabin, Gert Fröbe, George Raft, Nadja Tiller.
- Upper Hand (2010) Directed by Michael Nolan. With Bryan Massey

== Music ==
- "The Upper Hand", song by The Mighty Mighty Bosstones from The Magic of Youth
- "Upper Hand", song by LeAnn Rimes, composed by LeAnn Rimes and Troy Verges from Family (LeAnn Rimes album)
- "Upper Hand", song by Doug Gillard
- "Upper Hand", song by Ex Norwegian from Sketch
- "Upper Hand", song by Goldfinger from Open Your Eyes
- "Upper Hand (Sexy Mama)", song by Indra (singer) from the album One Woman Show
- "Upper Hand", song by Sean T. from the album Straight from the Streets
