= Homesick (Chris Price album) =

Studio album by Chris Price
- Released: May 22, 2012
- Genres: Indie pop, garage rock
- Length: 34:35
- Label: Price The Band LLC
- Producer: Chris Price

Chris Price chronology
Homesick (2012)	Stop Talking (2017)

Homesick is the debut studio album by Chris Price. It was released on May 22, 2012. Self-produced by Price, the album was recorded entirely on an iPhone 4 using nothing but the mic of the phone and an app called 4Tracks that simulates the process of recording to 4-track tape recording. Lead single "That's Your Boyfriend" was chosen as ITunes Single Of The Week at the time of release.

== Reception ==
The album received generally positive reviews. Writing a 4 star review for the New York Daily News, Jim Farber says "Price may not be the first person to record a full album this way, but he could be the most talented to do so. He has the skill to mimic classic pop in his compositions. While the songwriter grew up in Miami, and now lives in L.A., his songs have a vintage Brit-pop snap, evident in their Carnaby Street-styled melodies and their subject matter, much of the latter askew enough to impress Ray Davies." Katie Hasty writes in HitFix about lead single "That's Your Boyfriend", "it’s little wonder that the single 'That’s Your Boyfriend' is today’s (May 22) iTunes Single of the Week." The blog Powerpopaholic wrote, in a 9 out of 10 review, "the melodies are darn near perfect, similar to Mike Viola on the title track, and “Suicide” is a fast paced gem with jangling riffs."

== Track listing ==
All tracks are written by Chris Price except where noted.

No.	Title	Length
1.	"Suicide"	2:35
2.	"That's Your Boyfriend"	2:54
3.	"Homesick"	3:14
4.	"Outside Looking In"	3:09
5.	"Wrong Time"	3:02
6.	"Up in Flames"	3:03
7.	"For All We Know"	2:35
8.	"English Gardens"	2:09
9.	"One of Us" (Chris Price, Taylor Locke)	2:19
10.	"The Last Supper" (Price, Locke, Bethany Davis)	2:55
11.	"You Won't See Me Again" (Price, Corey Perez)	4:13
12.	"Deep Cut"	2:08
