= All Your Heroes Become Villains =

Studio album by Ed Hale and The Transcendence
- Released: November 15, 2011
- Recorded: 2006–2010
- Genre: Alternative rock
- Label: Dying Van Gogh Records
- Producers: Ed Hale and Fred Freeman

Ed Hale and The Transcendence chronology
Nothing Is Cohesive (2004)	All Your Heroes Become Villains (2011)

Professional ratings
Review scores
Source	Rating
PopMatters	6/10 stars

All Your Heroes Become Villains is the fourth album released by the musical collective Ed Hale and The Transcendence. It is a concept album and features a variety of musical styles including britpop, progressive rock, blues based rock as well as experimental and chamber pop moments. It was released November 15, 2011, on Dying Van Gogh Records. It was the follow-up to their 2004 album; Nothing Is Cohesive and was in fact started in 2006 and took several years to complete.

== Track listing ==
1. "All Your Heroes Become Villains – Main Theme" – 3:56
2. "Blind Eye" – 3:18
3. "Solaris" – 3:36
4. "Waiting For Godot" – 4:43
5. "All Your Heroes Become Villains – Part III: Taking The Fall" – 1:31
6. "Here It Comes" – 3:46
7. "Indian Princess" – 5:06
8. "Messed It Up Again" – 3:21
9. "We Are Columbine (The Unforgiven)" – 4:14
10. "After Tomorrow" – 7:09
11. "Last Stand at the Walls of Zion" – 2:57
