= Taylor Locke and the Roughs =

American rock band

Taylor Locke and the Roughs is a 4-piece rock band based out of Los Angeles, CA. It consists of guitarist Taylor Locke from the band Rooney, guitarist/keyboardist Chris Price from the band Price, bassist Brandon Schwartzel (from the band FIDLAR), and drummer Joe Seiders (from the New Pornographers). They released two albums in 2010 entitled Grain & Grape and Marathon.

== Biography ==
The band was started in 2009 as a result of Taylor Locke and Chris Price collaborating on a number of songs over the course of 2 years. They both shared an affinity for the rock bands of the 1960s and '70s such as the Beatles and Badfinger. Their intention was to write eclectic songs that would marry the various influences they shared. Taylor felt that the material told a personal story about the things he was going through in his life. They brought on drummer Mikey McCormack to record 10 songs in November 2009 and later asked bassist Charlotte Froom to join the band and complete the lineup. The album Grain & Grape was released in March 2010 to enthusiastic critical response. Sessions for a second album followed in May 2010. This resulted in the album Marathon, released in October 2010. Both albums wound up on numerous end-of-year lists. Froom and McCormack subsequently left the band and were replaced by bassist Brandon Schwartzel and drummer Joe Seiders.

== The Tom Leykis Show ==
For the 2012 streamcast relaunch of The Tom Leykis Show, the band created a custom untitled show theme.

== Discography ==
- Grain & Grape (2010)
- Marathon (2010)
