= Jeffrey Gaines =

American musician (born 1965)

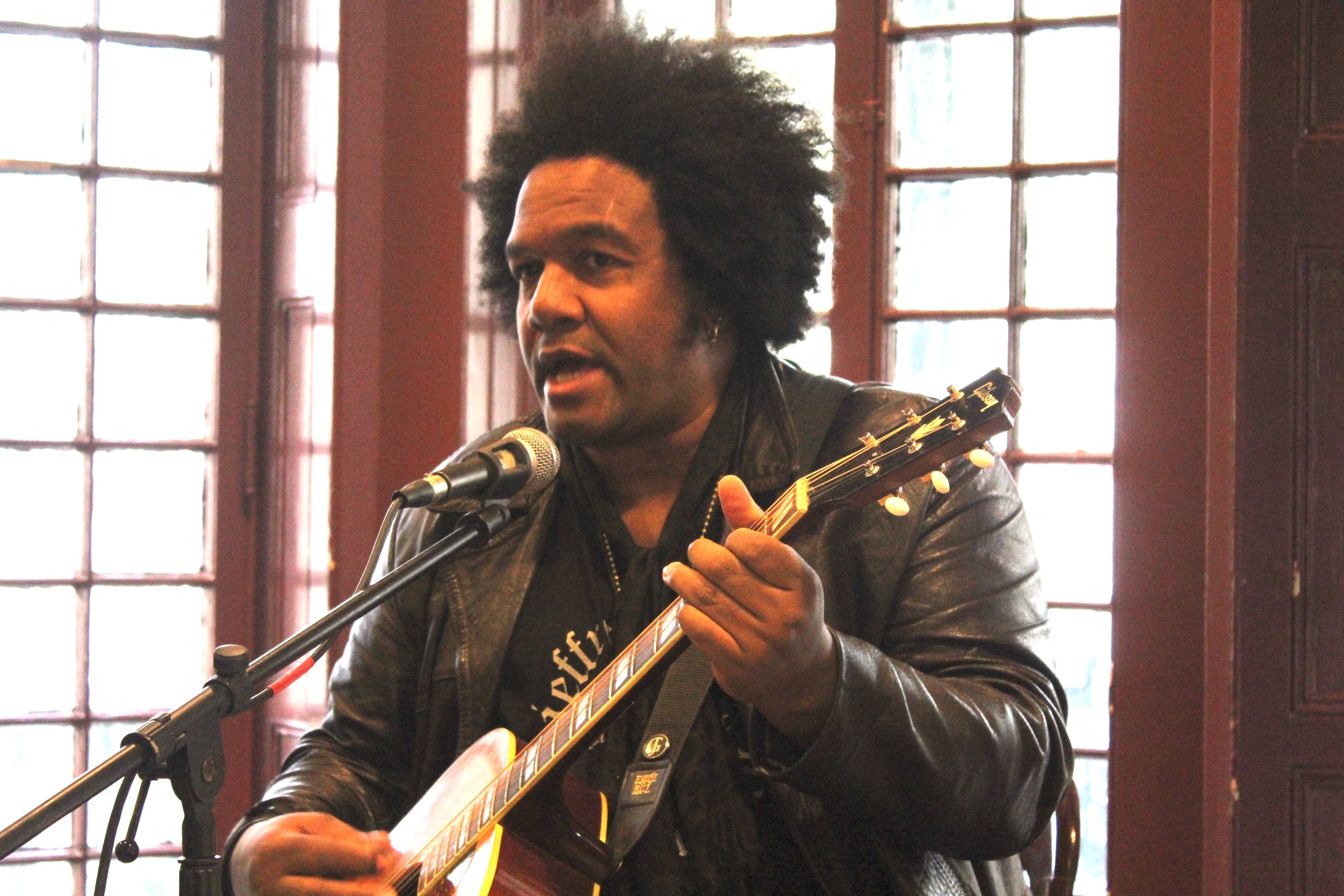
- Gaines in 2018

Background information
- Born: August 25, 1965 (age 60); Harrisburg, Pennsylvania, United States
- Genres: Rock, pop, alternative rock, folk rock
- Occupations: Singer, musician
- Instruments: Vocals, guitar
- Years active: 1990–present
- Labels: Chrysalis, EMI Records Group, Capital Records Canada, Rykodisc, Artemis, Omnivore Recordings, JGM Ltd.
- Website: jeffreygaines.com

Jeffrey Gaines is an American singer-songwriter and guitarist. Born in Harrisburg, Pennsylvania, he was signed to the Chrysalis Records label in 1990 and released his debut album, Jeffrey Gaines, in 1992.

== Life and career ==
The first single off the Jeffrey Gaines album was "Hero in Me". Gaines performed that song live on Good Morning America and the song received some radio and MTV airplay, but it would be the b-side to his second single that would eventually give him his biggest hit. "Scares Me More" featured an acoustic live version of Peter Gabriel's "In Your Eyes", which Gabriel had taken to number 26 on the Billboard Hot 100 in 1986. Re-released by Gabriel in 1989 after a resurgence in popularity due to the song's inclusion in a key scene in the film Say Anything..., Gabriel's single recharted but failed to hit the Top 40. Gaines' acoustic version received some radio attention but neither side of the single managed to chart nationally in 1992.

Gaines re-recorded both live and studio versions of "In Your Eyes" in 2001 for his fourth album, the independent release Always Be, and the song was released to radio. This time Gaines hit number 22 on the U.S. Adult Top 40 chart and the slow-burning hit remained on the 40-place chart for 22 weeks. Gabriel's own version of the ballad also continued to smolder, being certified as Gabriel's first U.S. Gold single to date in 2005, 19 years after its release.

Gaines was one of the artists invited to contribute vocals to the benefit CD We are Family, produced by Nile Rodgers after the September 11, 2001 attacks with profits going to the families affected by the tragedy and "dedicated to the vision of a global family" and respect and understanding of cultural diversity. The single peaked at No. 9 on Billboard′s Hot Singles Sales chart in late 2001 and number 32 on Billboard's Hot Dance Club Play chart in early 2002.

Gaines has performed his original compositions live on Late Night with Conan O'Brien, VH-1, Friday Night Videos and A&E's Breakfast with the Arts.

Gaines has toured with artists including Tom Petty and the Heartbreakers, Tori Amos, Tracy Chapman, Melissa Etheridge, Sting, Bryan Adams, Heart, Gregg Allman, Richard Thompson, Joe Jackson and Stevie Nicks. In addition to the Gabriel song Gaines' sets of original material occasionally include covers of songs by other artists as diverse as Elvis Costello, The Monkees, and Roberta Flack, and he continues to perform live.

In 2016, Gaines did an extensive career retrospective interview with The Pods & Sods Network.

== Discography ==
=== Albums ===
- Jeffrey Gaines (1992, Chrysalis Records)
- Somewhat Slightly Dazed (1994, Chrysalis Records)
- Galore (1998, Rykodisc)
- Always Be (2001, Artemis Records)
- Toward the Sun (2003, Artemis Records)
- Jeffrey Gaines Live (2004, Artemis Records)
- Live in Europe (2012, JGM Ltd.)
- Alright (2018, Omnivore Recordings)

=== Singles ===
- "Hero in Me" (1992, Chrysalis Records)
- "Scares Me More" (1992, Chrysalis Records)
- "Headmasters of Mine" (1993, Chrysalis Records)
- "I Like You" (1994, Chrysalis/EMI Records)
- "I Know a Man" (1994, Chrysalis/EMI)
- "Right My Wrongs" (1998, Rykodisc)
- "We Are Family" with Various Artists (2001, Tommy Boy Entertainment) – Sister Sledge cover
- "Always Be" (2001, Artemis Records)
- "In Your Eyes" (2001, Artemis Records) – Peter Gabriel cover
- "Shake It Off" (2001, Artemis Records)
- "Falling Apart" (2003, Artemis Records)
- "Call It Love" with Paula Cole & Brian Stratton (2015, Atlantis Records) – Poco cover
- "To Be Free" (2016, JGM Recordings) – non-album track
- "Children's Games" (2016, JGM Recordings) – non-album track
- "Feel Alright" (2018, Omnivore Recordings)
