= Jamie James =

Canadian musician

- Born: August 4, 1953 (age 72)
- Origin: Canada
- Genres: Rockabilly, rock and roll
- Occupations: Guitarist, singer, songwriter
- Instruments: Guitar, vocals
- Years active: 1978–present
- Labels: RSO, Vanity Records, Schoolkids Records, Oglio Records, We Jam Music
- Formerly of: The Kingbees, DQ and The Sharks, Steppenwolf

Jamie James (born August 4, 1953) is a Canadian guitarist, singer and songwriter, best known for his roles in DQ And The Sharks and Steppenwolf. He was also lead singer and founding member of RSO recording trio The Kingbees.

== Career ==
James was initially known as the leader and founder of the rockabilly trio The Kingbees, active between 1978 and 1982. The group included drummer Rex Roberts and bassist Michael Rummans. The Kingbees recorded two albums with David J. Holman, producing on RSO. The first, titled The Kingbees, (released March 1980) featured the James-penned hit "My Mistake" (#81 on Billboard Hot 100 chart). The second album, titled The Big Rock, was released in March 1981 and also spawned national touring, a performance on Dick Clark's American Bandstand and a cameo role in the movie The Idolmaker. Shortly thereafter the band split up.

In 1983 James released a solo EP with Vanity Records titled The Big One. In the late 1980s, James hooked up with noted actor Harry Dean Stanton to form a unique musical ensemble which performed until the year 2000.

In 2000 James went on to form the rock and roll band "DQ and The Sharks" featuring actor/musician Dennis Quaid.

In 1993 James had also released a solo LP on Schoolkids Records titled Cruel World. In 2000 he released his latest solo LP on Oglio Records, titled Crossroads. Oglio also released a two-album CD issue of the Kingbees first and second LPs.

James resides in Los Angeles, where he formed a new record label with friend and business partner Fred Wehba. We Jam Music was created by James and Wehba to produce and release new albums including James' newest release Love Attack.

== Discography ==
=== With The Kingbees ===
Studio albums

- The Kingbees (1980)
- The Big Rock (1981)

Singles

- "My Mistake" / "Once Is Not Enough" (1980, #81 U.S.)
- "Shake-Bop" / "No Respect" (1980)
- "Sweet Sweet Girl To Me" / "Shake-Bop" (1980)
- "She Can't 'Make-Up' Her Mind" / "Stick It Out!" (1981)
- "The Big Rock" / "The Ugly Truth" (1982)
- "Tear It Up" / "Gonna Stop" (1982)
- "Just Like That" / "If I Want To" (1982)

=== Solo ===
Studio albums

- Cruel World (1993)
- Crossroads (2000)

EPs

- The Big One (1984)
