= Transcendence (band) =

American alternative rock band

Ed Hale and The Transcendence
- Origin: Miami, FL
- Genres: Alternative rock, indie rock, world music
- Years active: 2000 – present
- Labels: TMG Records; Dying Van Gogh Records
- Members: Ed Hale; Fernando Perdomo; Roger Houdaille; Allan Gabay; Bill Sommer; Ricardo Mazzi
- Past members: Jon Rose; Joe Trainor; Howard "Stro" Stroman
- Website: Official Transcendence website

Transcendence is an alternative rock band formed by Ed Hale in 2000. The band is a musical collective of musicians from the Miami and New York City music scenes. Members include Ed Hale (lead vocals and guitar), Fernando Perdomo (lead guitar and backing vocals), Roger Houdaille (bass guitar and backing vocals), Allan Gabay (keyboards), Ricardo Mazzi (drums) and Bill Sommer (drums). The band released three albums from 2002 to 2004, including the critically acclaimed Nothing Is Cohesive before taking a hiatus. There are two finished albums set for release in 2009 on the Dying Van Gogh record label.

The group officially changed their name to Ed Hale and The Transcendence prior to the release of their fourth studio album, All Your Heroes Become Villains. As a result, their back catalog is now found under the new name across digital retail stores.

== Discography ==
=== Albums ===
- Rise And Shine (2002)
- Sleep With You (2003)
- Nothing Is Cohesive (2004)
- The City of Lost Children: Rare and Unreleased Tracks (2008)
- All Your Heroes Become Villains (2011)
- The Great Mistake (2012) (currently unreleased)

=== EPs ===
- The Journey - Remix EP (2002)
- Girls (2003)
