= Echo in the Canyon =

2018 film directed by Andrew Slater

- Directed by: Andrew Slater
- Written by: Eric Barrett; Andrew Slater
- Starring: Jakob Dylan; Brian Wilson; Tom Petty; Ringo Starr; Eric Clapton; Stephen Stills; Roger McGuinn; Michelle Phillips; David Crosby; Graham Nash
- Production company: Mirror Films
- Distributed by: Greenwich Entertainment
- Release date: 2018
- Running time: 82 minutes
- Country: United States
- Language: English
- Box office: $3.4 million

Echo in the Canyon is a 2018 film directed by Andrew Slater. The film is produced by Eric Barrett and Andrew Slater under the banner of Mirror Films. The film stars Lou Adler, Fiona Apple, the Beach Boys, Beck, Tom Petty, Jackson Browne, Buffalo Springfield, the Byrds, Jade Castrinos, Eric Clapton, David Crosby, Jakob Dylan, Norah Jones, and Michelle Phillips.

It had its world premiere at the LA Film Festival on September 20, 2018. It was released in theaters May 24, 2019. An accompanying soundtrack has also been released on CD, vinyl, and digitally featuring Jakob Dylan and guests such as Eric Clapton, Neil Young, Fiona Apple, and Beck, among others.

== Plot ==
Echo in the Canyon celebrates the popular music that came out of L.A.'s Laurel Canyon neighborhood in the mid-1960s as folk went electric and the Byrds, the Beach Boys, Buffalo Springfield, and the Mamas and the Papas cemented the California Sound. It was a moment (1965 to 1967) when bands came to L.A. to emulate the Beatles and Laurel Canyon emerged as a hotbed of creativity and collaboration for a new generation of musicians who would soon put an indelible stamp on the history of American popular music.

Hosted by Jakob Dylan, the film explores the Laurel Canyon scene via never-before-heard personal details behind the bands and their songs and how that music continues to inspire today. The songs from that era provide an entry point as Dylan and some of his fellow musicians interpret and perform many of these classic songs in concert at L.A.'s Orpheum Theatre.

Echo in the Canyon contains candid conversations and performances with Brian Wilson (The Beach Boys), Michelle Phillips (The Mamas & the Papas), Stephen Stills (Buffalo Springfield), David Crosby (The Byrds), Roger McGuinn (The Byrds), their contemporaries Ringo Starr, Eric Clapton, Graham Nash and slightly younger followers Jackson Browne and Tom Petty (in his last film interview), as well as more recent musicians influenced by their music, such as Beck, Fiona Apple, Cat Power, Jade Castrinos, Regina Spektor and Norah Jones.

== Cast ==
- Lou Adler
- Fiona Apple
- The Beach Boys (archive footage)
- The Beatles (archive footage)
- Beck
- Jackson Browne
- Buffalo Springfield
- The Byrds
- Jade Castrinos
- Eric Clapton
- David Crosby
- Jakob Dylan
- Norah Jones
- The Mamas and the Papas (archive footage)
- Roger McGuinn
- Graham Nash
- Tom Petty
- Michelle Phillips
- Cat Power
- John Sebastian
- Stephen Stills
- Regina Spektor
- Ringo Starr
- Brian Wilson
- Neil Young
- The Echo in the Canyon Band
  - Geoff Pearlman - Guitar
  - Fernando Perdomo - Guitar
  - Justine Bennett - Backing Vocals
  - Jordan Summers - Keyboards
  - Dan Rothchild - Bass and Backing Vocals
  - Matt Tecu - Drums

== Reception ==
=== Box office ===
The film opened with $103,716 from its showings at the ArcLight Hollywood and the Landmark Theatre Los Angeles, with a location average of $51,868 in three days, making it the best per theatre average opening for a documentary so far in 2019.

The film had a total domestic gross of $3,355,324.

=== Critical response ===
On the review aggregator Rotten Tomatoes, the film holds an approval rating of 90% based on 80 reviews, and an average rating of 7/10. The website's critical consensus reads, "A thoroughly entertaining look at the Laurel Canyon scene as well as the musical history surrounding it, Echo in the Canyon is essential viewing for rock doc fans." Metacritic, which uses a weighted average, assigned the film a score of 70 out of 100, based on 17 critics, indicating "generally favorable" reviews.

Richard Roeper of the Chicago Sun-Times wrote, "This is a sunny, sepia-toned, nostalgic trip to the past. The protest movements of the time are acknowledged — after all, many of these songs were anthems for change and peace — but this isn't a historical documentary about class warfare and racial strife and the anti-war movement and the Manson Family murders, etc." Brad Wheeler of The Globe and Mail wrote, "That's David Crosby's take on the seminal California folk-rock scene of 1965 to '67, an era explained lovingly and with due reverence in the hashish-scented documentary Echo in the Canyon." In addition, the movie has been criticized for glaring omissions about the historical period, namely other rock music luminaries who resided in the area at that time, such as Jim Morrison of the Doors and the singer-songwriter Joni Mitchell.

== Music credits ==
Here are the music credits listed at the end of the film.

- "Turn, Turn, Turn", The Byrds
- "Wild Mountain Thyme", The Byrds
- "I Want to Hold Your Hand", The Beatles
- "I'll Feel a Whole Lot Better", The Byrds
- "Bells of Rhymney, Pete Seeger"
- "It Wont Be Wrong", The Byrds
- "California Girls", The Beach Boys
- "Sloop John B", The Beach Boys
- "In My Room", The Beach Boys
- "You Still Believe in Me", The Beach Boys
- "Pet Sounds", The Beach Boys
- "I Just Wasn't Made for These Times", The Beach Boys
- "Dedicated to the One I Love", The Mamas & the Papas
- "California Dreamin'", The Mamas & the Papas
- "Monday, Monday", The Mamas & the Papas
- "Boys and Girls Together", The Mamas & the Papas
- "Go Where You Wanna Go", The Mamas & the Papas
- "Your Gonna Lose that Girl", The Beatles
- "If I Needed Someone", The Beatles
- "You Showed Me", The Turtles
- "Bluebird Revisited", Stephen Stills
- "Questions", Stephen Stills
- "Black Queen", Stephen Stills
- "The 'In' Crowd", Ramsey Lewis Trio
- "Never My Love", R. Address, D. Addrisi
- "Somebody Groovy", The Mamas & the Papas
- "I Feel a Whole Lot Better", The Byrds
- "Goin' Back", C. King, G. Goffin
- "Triad", The Byrds
- "What's Happening?!?!", The Byrds
- "Ding Dang", The Beach Boys
- "Expecting to Fly", Neil Young
