= Sketch (Ex Norwegian album) =

Studio album by Ex Norwegian
- Released: November 15, 2011
- Recorded: 2009–2010
- Genre: Indie rock
- Label: Dying Van Gogh Records
- Producer: Ex Norwegian

Ex Norwegian chronology
Standby (2009)	Sketch (2011)	House Music (2012)

Sketch is the second album by Miami Beach-based indie rock band Ex Norwegian. It was self-produced and originally self-released in June 2010. On November 15, 2011, it was released by Dying Van Gogh Records with the song Girl With The Moustache replacing Tired Of Dancing. The album reached #87 on the CMJ charts. Sketch was the last album recorded with bassist Nina Souto and drummer Arturo Garcia.

== Track listing ==
1. "Jet Lag" - 3:10
2. "Smashing Time" - 3:01
3. "Mind Down" - 3:17
4. "Sky Diving" - 3:18
5. "You're Elastic Over Me" - 1:58
6. "Seconds" - 3:31
7. "Upper Hand" - 2:30
8. "Turn Left" - 3:13
9. "Acting On An Island" - 3:42
10. "Girl With The Moustache" - 3:13
