= Parallelograms (album) =

Studio album by Linda Perhacs
- Released: 1970
- Recorded: 1969–1970
- Genres: Psychedelic folk; folk rock
- Length: 41:02
- Label: Kapp (Note: The album has been reissued by five different labels: The Wild Places (1998 and 2008), Sunbeam Records (2008), Mexican Summer/Sundazed Music (2010) and Anthology Recordings (2014))
- Producer: Leonard Rosenman

Linda Perhacs chronology
Parallelograms (1970)	The Soul of All Natural Things (2014)

Professional ratings
Review scores
Source	Rating
AllMusic	4.5/5 stars
Pitchfork	8.6/10
The Sydney Morning Herald	(favorable)
Tiny Mix Tapes	5/5 stars
Uncut	5/5 stars

Parallelograms is an album by American psychedelic folk singer Linda Perhacs. It was produced by Leonard Rosenman. The album was largely ignored when originally released on Kapp Records in 1970. Discouraged by the lack of commercial attention and the label's reluctance to promote the album, Perhacs returned to her career as a dental hygienist.

== Reissues ==
Folk label the Wild Places reissued Parallelograms on CD and double LP in 2003. Sunbeam Records again reissued the album in 2008, adding two bonus tracks, the previously unreleased 1978 song "I Would Rather Love" and an excerpt of a 2005 BBC interview.

Parallelograms was reissued again on vinyl by both Mexican Summer and Sundazed Music in 2010, and by Anthology Recordings in 2014.

== Track listing ==
All tracks composed and written by Linda Perhacs, except "Hey, Who Really Cares?" co-written by Oliver Nelson.

Side one

1. "Chimacum Rain" – 3:33
2. "Paper Mountain Man" – 3:13
3. "Dolphin" – 2:56
4. "Call of the River" – 3:51
5. "Sandy Toes" – 3:00
6. "Parallelograms" – 4:36

Side two

1. "Hey, Who Really Cares?" – 2:44
2. "Moons and Cattails" – 4:09
3. "Morning Colors" – 4:48
4. "Porcelain Baked Cast Iron Wedding" – 4:01
5. "Delicious" – 4:08

== Personnel ==
- Linda Perhacs – vocals, guitar, electronic effects, arranger
- Leonard Rosenman – electronic effects, arranger, producer
- Steve Cohn – lead guitar (6-string, 12-string, electric), arranger
- John Neufield – flute, saxophone
- Milt Holland, Shelly Manne – percussion
- Reinie Press – electric bass, Fender guitar
- "Tommy" – harmonica
- Brian Ingoldsby – amplified shower hose for horn effects (1)
