= Ex Norwegian =

American indie rock band

- Origin: Miami Beach, Florida, US
- Genres: Indie rock Powerpop; Britpop
- Years active: 2008–present
- Labels: Dying Van Gogh Records, Limited Fanfare Records, Fruits de Mer Records
- Members: Roger Houdaille; Lucia Perez
- Past members: Carolina Souto; Arturo Garcia; Billie G Lucas Queiroz; Michelle Grand; Giuseppe Rodriguez
- Website: http://www.exnorwegian.com/

Ex Norwegian is an American indie rock band from Miami Beach, Florida, formed in 2008.

== Origin ==
Ex Norwegian originated in Miami Beach in the summer of 2008 and officially launched at that year's CMJ Festival in New York City after the success of their debut single "Something Unreal". The band was created out of Roger Houdaille's Father Bloopy project, which bassist Carolina Souto was also involved in. The two recruited drummer Arturo Garcia midway through sessions for the debut album. The band immediately stuck a rapport with each other and the South Florida music scene, landing several features in key local media, including the cover of City Link. The band was invited to sign with SESAC at the same time record labels took notice. The band would eventually license their debut album with New York label, Dying Van Gogh Records.

== Standby ==
After their first tour, the band released their debut album Standby on May 19, 2009, thru Dying Van Gogh Records. Three of the album's songs were co-produced with Fernando Perdomo, including their first radio hit "Something Unreal". Other featured tracks were "Don't Bother", "Fresh Pit", and "Sudeki Lover", a song co-written with Eric Hernandez of Capsule and Kylesa.

== Sketch ==
The band spent the latter half of 2009 and early 2010 recording their second album, Sketch, which was self-produced and eventually self-released in June 2010. On November 15, 2011, Dying Van Gogh Records released the ten-track album, with minor changes from the original. It was a minor hit in college radio, reaching No. 87 on the CMJ chart.

They became a spokesgroup for the bottled water brand evian which ended in a temporary split in March 2011. With the re-release of Sketch, Roger Houdaille re-grouped the band with new musicians and performed in New York, Boston and Miami in support of Sketch.

== House Music and Crack ==
Houdaille completed the third Ex Norwegian album, titled House Music, which was released October 12, 2012. Dying Van Gogh Records released a teaser single off the album, "Original Copy," on February 14, 2012. This was followed by the album Crack which was released on April 2, 2013, via the South Florida-based independent label Limited Fanfare Records.

== Discography ==
=== Albums ===
Year	Title	Label
2009	Standby	Dying Van Gogh Records
2010	Sketch	Dippy Records
2011	Sketch (re-release)	Dying Van Gogh Records
2012	House Music	Dying Van Gogh Records
2013	Crack	Limited Fanfare Records
2014	Wasted Lines	Limited Fanfare Records
2015	Pure Gold	Dippy Records
2016	Glazer/Hazerr	Dippy Records
2017	Tekstet (Subtitled)	Dippy Records
2018	No Sleep	Dippy Records
2020	Hue Spotting	Think Like A Key Music
2021	Sing Jimmy Campbell	Think Like A Key Music
2022	Spook Du Jour	Think Like A Key Music
2023	Sooo Extra	Think Like A Key Music

=== Singles ===
Year	Title
2008	"Something Unreal"
2008	"Dance Trance Pants" / "Don't Bother'"
2009	"Mind Down"
2010	"Jet Lag"
2012	"Original Copy" / "Ebaneezer Beaver"
