= The Soul of All Natural Things =

Studio album by Linda Perhacs
- Released: March 18, 2014
- Recorded: 2012–13
- Genre: Folk
- Label: Asthmatic Kitty
- Producers: Chris Price and Fernando Perdomo

Linda Perhacs chronology
Parallelograms (1970)	The Soul of All Natural Things (2014)	I'm a Harmony (2017)

Professional ratings
Aggregate scores
Source	Rating
Metacritic	73/100
Review scores
Source	Rating
AllMusic	4/5 stars
The New York Times	Positive
NME	8/10
The Observer	4/5 stars
Pitchfork	6.8/10.0
Slant Magazine	2.5/5 stars
The Line of Best Fit	7/10
Uncut	3.5/5 stars

The Soul of All Natural Things is the second studio album by American singer Linda Perhacs, released by Asthmatic Kitty Records in 2014. It was produced by Chris Price and Fernando Perdomo. It was released 44 years after her debut album Parallelograms in 1970, marking one of the longest gaps between studio albums.

== Track listing ==
The Soul of All Natural Things track listing
No.	Title	Length
1.	"The Soul of All Natural Things"	5:01
2.	"Children"	3:16
3.	"River of God"	4:23
4.	"Daybreak"	2:32
5.	"Intensity"	5:52
6.	"Freely"	3:33
7.	"Prisms of Glass"	4:20
8.	"Immunity"	3:11
9.	"When Things Are True Again"	4:37
10.	"Song of the Planets"	5:26

== Chart positions ==
Chart (2014)	Peak position
Billboard Americana/Folk Albums	21
Billboard Heatseekers	33
