= CamGlen Radio =

Scotland
- Broadcast area: Rutherglen, Cambuslang and surrounding areas; available worldwide through the internet
- Frequency: 107.9 MHz (FM)

Programming
- Language: English
- Format: Pop, Modern adult contemporary

Ownership
- Owner: Healthy n Happy Community Development Trust

History
- First air date: (RSL) May 2007 (Full-Time) 19 March 2015
- Former frequencies: 106.6 MHz; 87.7 MHz

Technical information
- Transmitter coordinates: 55.82857°N 4.210187°W

Links
- Webcast: http://camglenradio.org/live
- Website: CamGlenRadio.org

CamGlen Radio is a local radio station based in Rutherglen, South Lanarkshire, Scotland. It started broadcasting a full-time service on 19 March 2015.

The station plays both modern and older songs. It broadcasts on 107.9 FM to Rutherglen, Cambuslang and the surrounding area in South-East Glasgow and South Lanarkshire. It is also available through Wi-Fi radio and the internet.

== History ==
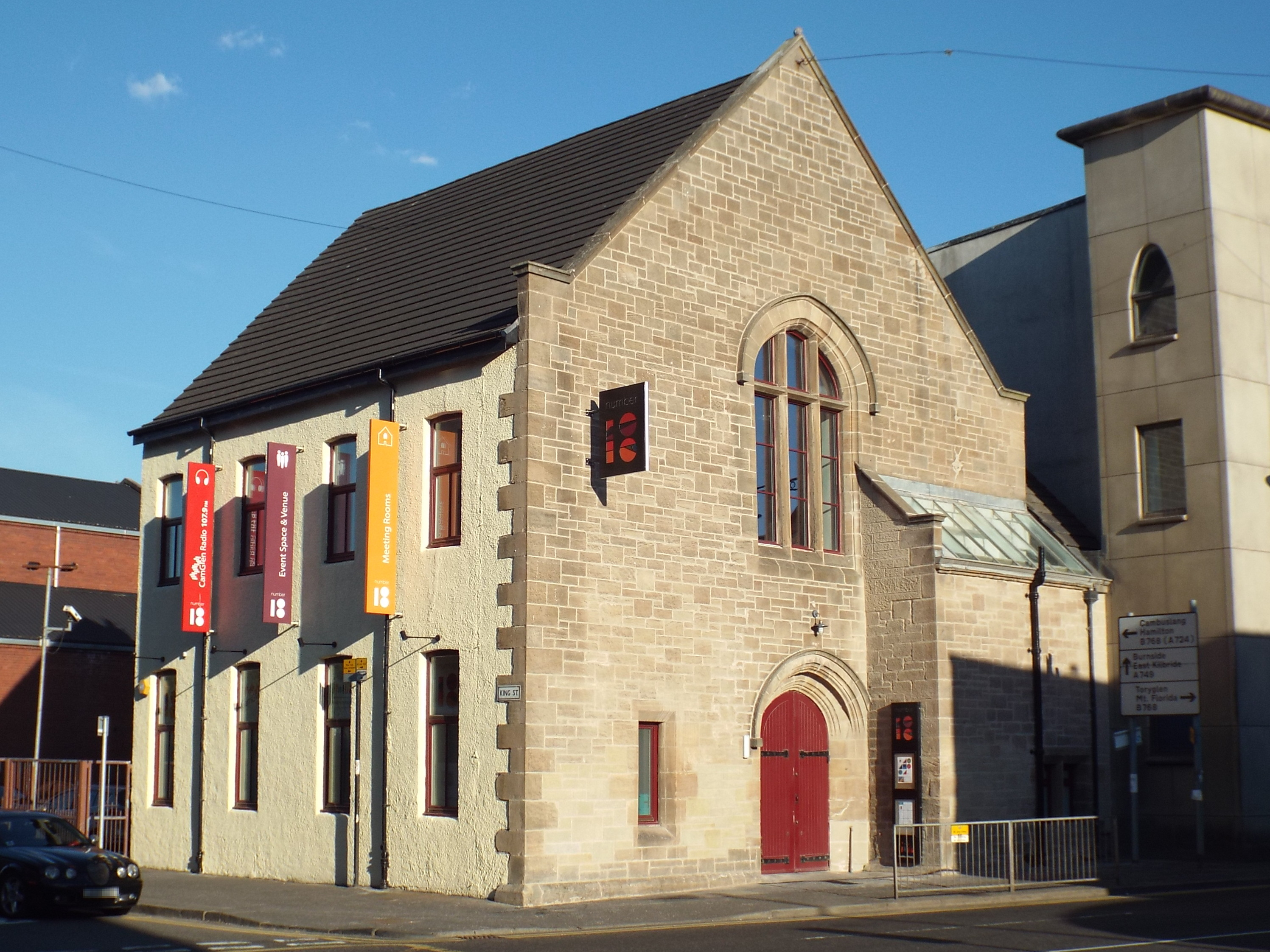
"Number 18", the current (as of Jul 2018) home of CamGlen Radio.

After the concept for the station came about in 2004-2005, the station first broadcast via a Restricted Service Licence in May 2007. Subsequently, it would complete eleven other short term broadcasts, during which planning for a full-time application began.

Having submitted a 27-page application on 13 Feb 2012, it was announced on 20 July of the same year that it had been awarded a community radio licence for full-time broadcasting The RSL broadcasts continued while preparation for the full-time licence began

The full-time launch was originally planned for 17 Jul 2014, but was delayed when a £436,000 grant was made available to Healthy n Happy (their parent organisation), to refurbish their base in the former church hall at 18 Farmeloan Road, Rutherglen. As a result, they launched eight months later than planned from temporary accommodation in Unit 10 of the next-door Aspire Building. The refurbishment of "Number 18" as a community hub including purpose-built studios was completed later than scheduled, and they ultimately took possession of their permanent home on the second floor of Number 18 on 7 Sep 2015, and began broadcast from there five days later. Upon the formal opening of the building on 9 Oct 2015, the launch party featuring local bands was broadcast live on CamGlen

== Programming ==
Based within the coverage area, CamGlen's licence requires daytime output typically comprising a 3:1 music/speech mix, with a varied musical output in the evenings. 90% of output must be locally produced, and the station must broadcast locally-produced output for a minimum of thirteen hours a day, of which eight hours must be original, non-repeat content.
