= Fernando Perdomo =

Guitarist and singer

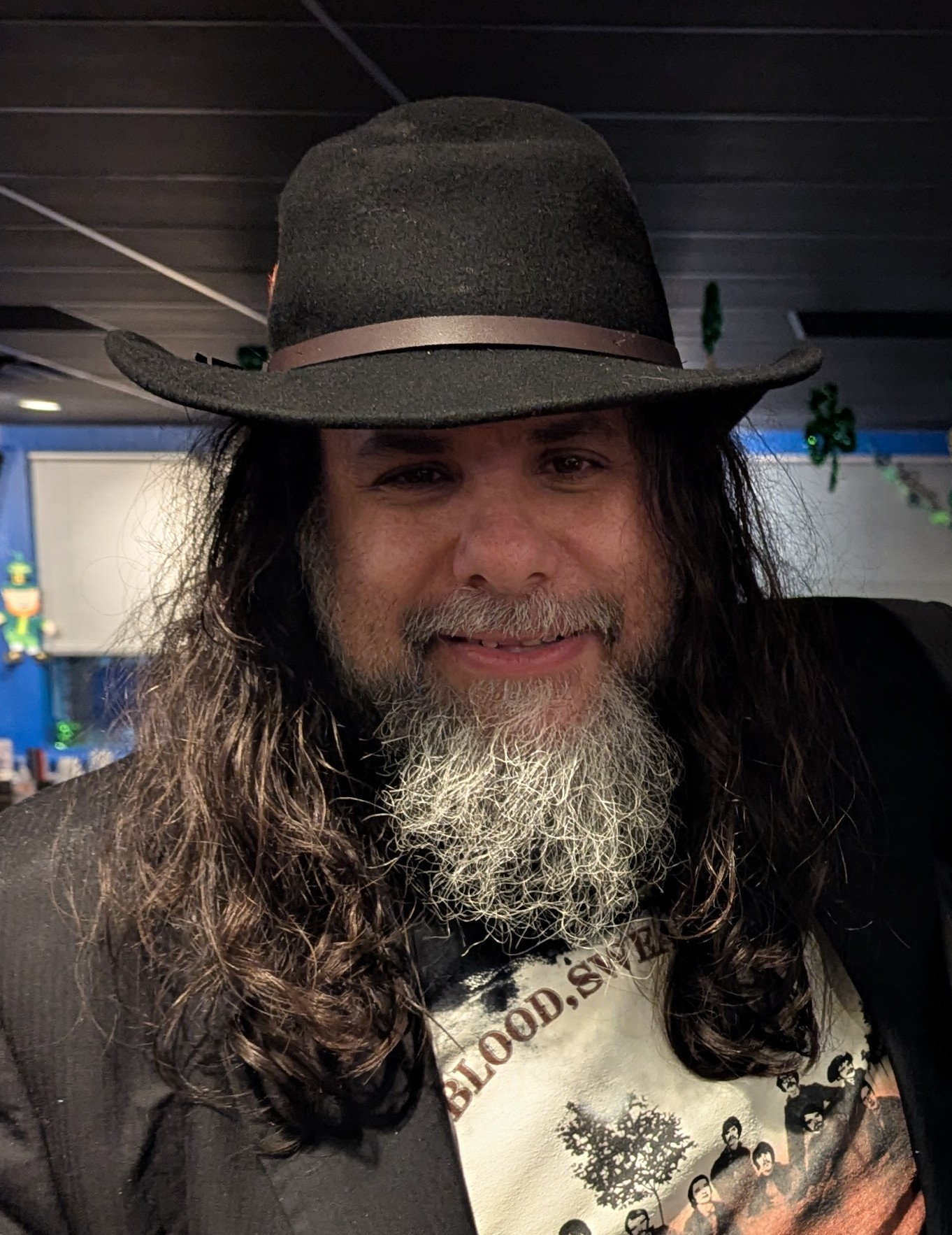
- Perdomo in March 2025

Background information
- Born: Fernando Jose Perdomo; August 17, 1980 (age 45); Miami Beach, Florida, U.S.
- Genres: Pop; pop rock; progressive rock
- Occupations: Musician; singer; composer; arranger; record producer
- Instruments: Guitar; vocals; keyboards; mandolin; piano; banjo; bass
- Years active: 1998–present
- Label: Forward Motion Records
- Website: fernandoperdomo.com

Fernando Jose Perdomo (born August 17, 1980) is an American musician and producer. He is a session bassist and guitarist. He is best known as one of the guitarists in the movie Echo in the Canyon, where he backed up Jakob Dylan, Fiona Apple, Beck, Norah Jones, Regina Spektor, Brian Wilson, and Cat Power.

He is a member of the Dave Kerzner Band, Marshall Crenshaw's touring band, Broken Sound, the Appice Perdomo Project, The Dirty Diamond, The Parlophonics, Life on Mars, and other side projects.

== Career ==
Perdomo started his career as a session guitar player after playing in Miami bands including Avenging Lawnmowers of Justice, Sixo, and Trophy Wife. In 1999, his guitar playing was featured in a Pier 1 Imports ad campaign. In 2002, at 22 he recorded most of the guitars for Cristian Castro's Amar Es. He toured with Castro throughout Latin America. Perdomo played lead guitar and piano for Soraya on her final tour. During that time Perdomo joined Ed Hale and Transcendence, adding a permanent guitarist to the band's often-changing lineup.

In 2007, Perdomo played and served as musical director for singer-songwriter Hilary McRae. In 2008, he produced an album for singer/songwriter Jorge Moreno (not yet released) and an album for Andy Pratt. Perdomo scored Gri-Gri, a film which premiered at the Cannes Film Festival. The movie featured an original song written by Moreno, Perdomo, and Marc Chourain. In late 2008, Perdomo produced a solo album by Transcendence singer Ed Hale entitled Ballad on Third Avenue. In 2009, Perdomo's project Dreaming in Stereo released an eponymous album on Hale's label, Dying Van Gogh. The album was re-released in the summer of 2010 through Perdomo's own label, Forward Motion Records. In 2010, Perdomo and Dreaming in Stereo were signed to a management deal with Bill Aucoin, shortly before Aucoin's death. The band played at SXSW in Austin, Texas in 2010.

In 2012, Perdomo released his debut solo EP, Home is Wherever You Are, produced by Chris Rodriguez. Also in 2012 Perdomo moved to Los Angeles and opened "Reseda Ranch Studios" in Reseda, a neighborhood in Los Angeles. His first project was co-producing (with Chris Price) The Soul of All Natural Things, the second album by Linda Perhacs for Asthmatic Kitty. Pitchfork Media lauded its strings and nylon-string guitar." In 2013, Perdomo formed Records and Tapes with Jennifer Jo Oberle. On November 16, 2013, he released "Cheese" a collaborative single with Dutch singer Linda Bloemhard of The Mo.

In 2014, Perdomo released his album, Warm. In the same year, he became the lead guitarist for The Dirty Diamond. In July 2015, Perdomo and Cait Brennan completed sessions for Brennan's first studio album, Debutante. The 13-song album was recorded in five days. Perdomo and Brennan split production duties and played all the instruments on the album. In December 2016, Brennan and Perdomo reunited at Ardent Studios in Memphis to record the follow-up, Third. The album was released by Omnivore Recordings, an indie label, on April 21, 2017.

On October 12, 2015, Perdomo was in the core band for Echo in the Canyon, an all star concert at the Orpheum Theatre in Los Angeles. The band backed up Jakob Dylan, Fiona Apple, Regina Spektor, Cat Power, and Jade Castrinos performing songs from the California folk rock era.

In 2016, Fernando Perdomo released a solo album called Voyeurs, which was recorded in front of a live audience on Facebook. In early 2017, he formed "Fern & Celli", an improvisational duo" with crossover cellist Ruti Celli. In May 2017, they opened for the jazz fusion violinist Jean-Luc Ponty, at the Canyon Club. They released two fully improvisational albums, The Conversations (2017) and Language (2019) and won as one of "5 best acts on the cruise" after their show on "Cruise To The Edge 2019". In February 2017, Perdomo along with Dave Kerzner were the musical directors for an All Star Tribute to Greg Lake on Cruise to the Edge. Their guests included Sonja Kristina of Curved Air, Billy Sherwood of Yes, Nick D'Virgilio of Spocks Beard, Derek Cintron, and Leslie Hunt of District 97 and American Idol.

Perdomo's album, The Golden Hour was released by Forward Motion Records on August 17, 2017. It was recorded at Ardent Studios and Reseda Ranch Studios, and mixed and mastered by Zach Ziskin. In November 2018, Perdomo released Zebra Crossing, with Zak Nilsson (son of Harry Nilsson), Cyndi Trissel, and the Beach Boys lyricist, Stephen Kalinich, appearing. It was recorded at Abbey Road Studios in London and is Perdomo's love letter to the studio and includes his cover of "While My Guitar Gently Weeps".

On May 24, 2019, the documentary film, Echo In The Canyon, premiered in theaters and the official soundtrack album was released on BMG Records. Perdomo appeared in the film as the guitarist in the backing band in most of the scenes, and he appeared on every track but one, on the soundtrack album. He has four albums called Out to Sea 1, 2, 3 and 4 on Cherry Red Records, a British independent label. The instrumental progressive rock albums feature cover art by Genesis artist, Paul Whitehead.

Perdomo has joined forces with Wings drummer Denny Seiwell to produce Ram On, a 50th anniversary tribute to Paul and Linda McCartney's Ram on Cherry Red Records. The album was released on May 14, 2021. Perdomo and Carmine Appice recorded Energy Overload, an album which was released in 2021. In 2022, Perdomo became the touring guitar player for Marshall Crenshaw for his "40 Years In Showbiz" tours. On October 2, 2022, Perdomo was a performer in the memorial concert for Alan White. He performed two songs with Jon Davison. One song was with Davison and Geoff Downes, and Perdomo sat in with Yes on "Roundabout", along with electric guitarist Karl Hoag. Perdomo composed the score for the movie Frost for Cleopatra Entertainment. The original soundtrack includes Perdomo's collaborations with Rick Wakeman, Downes, L. Shankar, and Terry Reid. On October 1, 2022, Perdomo and Hoag performed with Yes at Alan White's celebration of life at the Paramount Theater, filling in for Steve Howe.

In 2023, Perdomo's bands Nine Mile Station and Life on Mars signed recording contracts with Spirit of Unicorn/Cherry Red Records, and he formed Broken Sound with drummer Michael Collins—a band centered around the Fender Bass VI. Also in 2023, he became a staff producer for Cleopatra Records where he produced "Abbey Road Reimagined", "A Speedway On Saturns Rings," and "Beautiful Horizon" by The Fusion Syndicate, "Blue Exposure" by Chrome, and most of "A Very Metal Christmas 1 and 2". He also produced singles for Arthur Brown, Bette Smith, and Arthur Adams. In 2023 he produced a cover of Elton John's "Benny and the Jets" with American Idol season 21 contestant Sara Beth Liebe for DA Music. In 2023, Perdomo toured with Marshall Crenshaw playing lead guitar, and he released "Guitar As A Voice" on the digital boutique label, Goodtunes. In December 2023, he produced "Shepherds and Wisemen" for The Free Design by creating a new backing track to a 1968 vocal track.

In 2025, Perdomo released 12 monthly albums under the names Waves 1-12.The instrumental progressive rock albums were critically acclaimed. Goldmine magazine included the albums in their top 10 best progressive rock albums of 2025.

In 2026 Perdomo is releasing 12 monthly albums of New Age music called "Clouds 1-12".

In 2026 it was announced that Perdomo has joined forces with Grammy winning producer/drummer Andy Kravitz for a new project called Perdomo Kravitz.

Perdomo has co written and co produced a 30 song/90 minute Rock Opera called "When The Sun Goes Down On Sunset" with Sarah Melick. The Opera will feature Nick Santa Maria in the lead role of "Beau Malone". Todd Rundgren will voice the character of "Banks of the L.A.bel". Other notables in the cast are Pink Floyd backing vocalist Durga McBroom as "Jez The Manager", Dennis Atlas of Toto as "Beau 2.0" and Alison Albers as "Grace".
