= Jade Castrinos =

American singer and guitarist

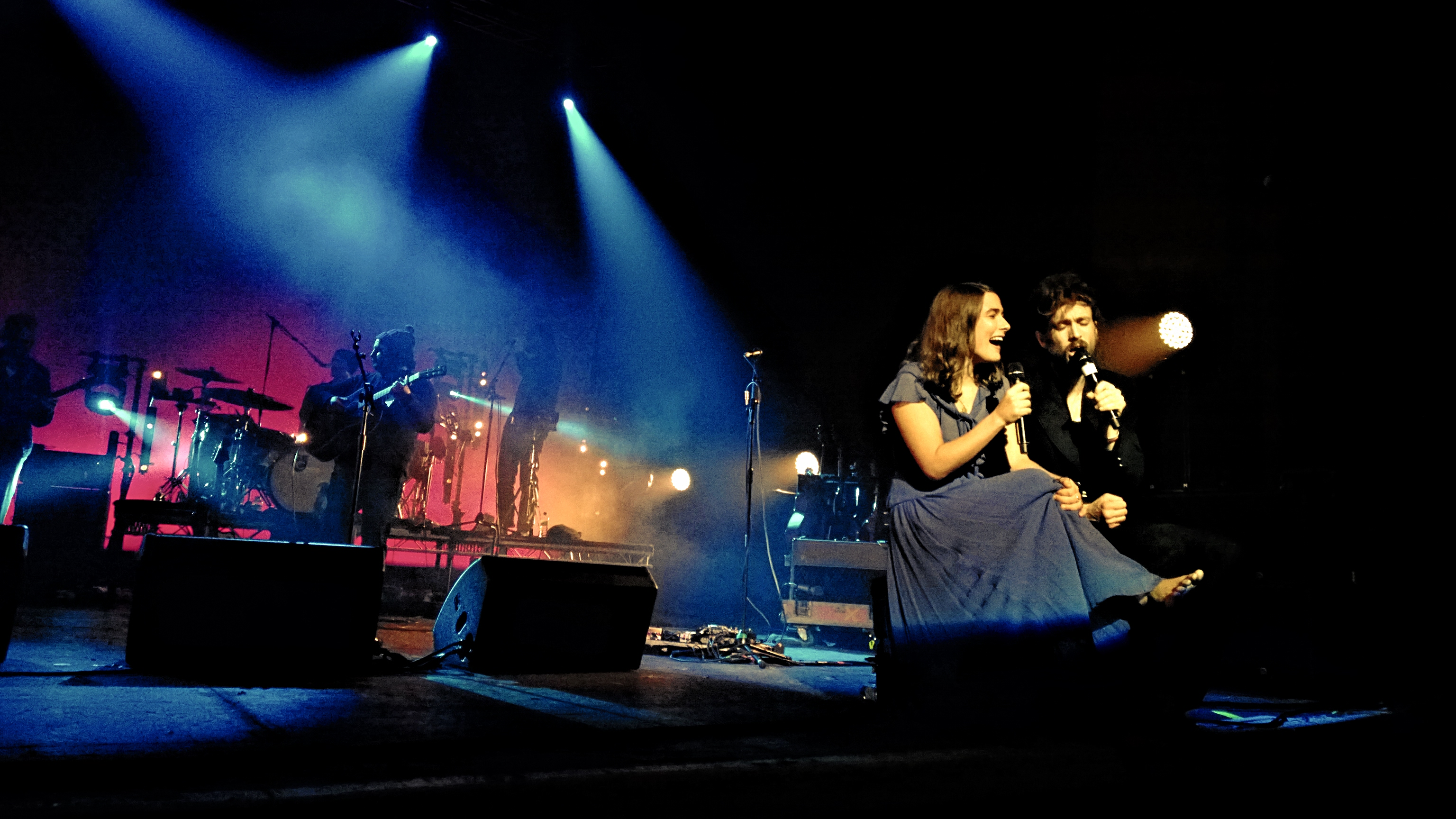
- Castrinos performing with Edward Sharpe and the Magnetic Zeros at Brixton Academy in 2014

Background information
- Born: Jade Castrinos; St. Petersburg, Florida, U.S.
- Origin: Los Angeles, California
- Occupations: Singer-songwriter, guitarist
- Instruments: Vocals, guitar
- Years active: 2000s–present

Jade Castrinos is an American singer and guitarist, best known as an early member of the indie-folk collective Edward Sharpe and the Magnetic Zeros. She later appeared as a featured vocalist in the documentary-concert project Echo in the Canyon (2019) and performed with Jakob Dylan on the project's soundtrack.

== Career ==
Before her work with Edward Sharpe and the Magnetic Zeros, Castrinos was active in Los Angeles's indie and arts scene.

She collaborated in her father George's band "The Black Cherrys".

=== Edward Sharpe and the Magnetic Zeros ===
Castrinos met singer Alex Ebert in 2007 in Los Angeles. Their collaboration led to the formation of Edward Sharpe and the Magnetic Zeros, with Castrinos performing as a guitarist and singer. As a vocalist, she performed with Ebert on the single "Home". In 2014, Castrinos left the band.

After leaving her former band, in 2015 she collaborated with "Treehouse" in their song "When I Saw You".

=== Echo in the Canyon ===
Castrinos appeared as herself in Andrew Slater's music documentary Echo in the Canyon, which explores the 1960s Laurel Canyon scene. She is the featured vocalist on the soundtrack's opening track, a cover of the Mamas and the Papas' "Go Where You Wanna Go". To promote the film and soundtrack, she performed "Go Where You Wanna Go" and "Dedicated to the One I Love" with Jakob Dylan and the Echo in the Canyon band on Jimmy Kimmel Live! in May 2019.

== Selected credits ==
- With Edward Sharpe and the Magnetic Zeros — vocalist/guitarist and ensemble member. Lead vocal duet on "Home" (2009).
- Echo in the Canyon (film, 2019) — appearance as herself.
- Echo in the Canyon (soundtrack, 2019) — Go Where You Wanna Go (lead vocal).
