= Omnivore Recordings =

American independent record label founded 2010

- Founded: 2010
- Founder: Cheryl Pawelski, Greg Allen, Dutch Cramblitt, Brad Rosenberger
- Distributor: Alternative Distribution Alliance
- Genre: Various
- Country of origin: U.S.
- Location: Los Angeles, California
- Official website: omnivorerecordings.com

Omnivore Recordings is an independent record label founded in 2010. It specializes in historical releases, reissues and previously unissued vintage recordings, as well as releases of new music. Omnivore's sister companies Omnivore Music Publishing and Omnivore Creative provide A&R and art direction/design consulting for recording artists, artist estates, and other record labels.

Omnivore has won two Grammy Awards in the Best Historical Album category.

== History ==
Omnivore's name was chosen to reflect the company's inclusive attitude toward the music it releases, which spans a wide variety of genres spanning the history of popular music.

In its fifteen year history, Omnivore has released over 600 albums, including archival music by acts including Arthur Alexander, America, the Bangles, the Beach Boys, Big Star, the Blind Boys of Alabama, Tim Buckley, Sandy Bull, Camper Van Beethoven, Alex Chilton, Gene Clark, Dennis Coffey, Continental Drifters, Culture, Bobby Darin, Dion, Dr. John, The Dream Syndicate, David "Honeyboy" Edwards, Fastball, Maynard Ferguson, Neil Finn, Game Theory, Allen Ginsberg, Andrew Gold, Vince Guaraldi, Arlo Guthrie, Woody Guthrie, Merle Haggard, John Wesley Harding, Judy Henske, Peter Holsapple and Chris Stamey, Wanda Jackson, Jan and Dean, Bert Jansch, Jellyfish, George Jones, Paul Kelly, The Knack, Lone Justice, Malo, Iain Matthews, Les McCann, Kate and Anna McGarrigle, The Motels, Bob Mould, Harry Nilsson, NRBQ, Old 97s, Buck Owens, Van Dyke Parks, Jaco Pastorius, Art Pepper, The Posies, Alan Price, Raspberries, Bobby Rush, Leon Russell, Soul Asylum, The Staple Singers, John Stewart, 10,000 Maniacs, Richard Thompson, Townes Van Zandt, Hank Williams and Brian Wilson, as well as vintage comedy recordings by Ernie Kovacs and Edie Adams. The label has also issued new music by Cindy Lee Berryhill, The Bo-Keys, Cait Brennan, Peter Case, Lloyd Cole, Jeffrey Gaines, Luke Haines and Peter Buck, The Long Ryders, The Muffs,Linda Perhacs, Chris Price, Pugwash and Steve Wynn.

Omnivore was launched in 2010 by a quartet of music industry veterans:

- Cheryl Pawelski, a Grammy-winning producer of archival and reissue albums who had previously worked with EMI-Capitol Records, Rhino Entertainment and Concord Music Group, where she oversaw reissue and boxed set projects by The Band, The Beach Boys, Big Star, John Coltrane, Miles Davis, Aretha Franklin, Judy Henske, Bette Midler, Willie Nelson, Otis Redding, Nina Simone, Rod Stewart, Richard Thompson, Wilco and Warren Zevon, as well as the Grammy-nominated boxed sets Rockin' Bones: 1950s Punk & Rockabilly, Woodstock 40 Years On: Back To Yasgur's Farm and Where the Action Is! Los Angeles Nuggets: 1965–1968.
- Greg Allen, a graphic designer and photographer whose previous work included major-label box sets by Ray Charles, John Coltrane, Alice Cooper, Miles Davis, Little Richard, Gram Parsons and Wilco.
- Dutch Cramblitt, former vice president at Rhino Entertainment and Nettwerk Entertainment.
- Brad Rosenberger, former head of strategic marketing for Warner Chappell Music.

The company also includes industry veterans Lee Lodyga (formerly of EMI-Capitol, Universal and Rhino) and Glenn Schwartz (formerly of Sony Music, Zomba Recording Corporation and Rhino), who work on record production and licensing.

Omnivore's initial releases were a pair of limited-edition vinyl issues for Record Store Day on April 16, 2011: the Big Star album Third [Test Pressing Edition], and the 7″ single "Close Up the Honky Tonks" by Buck Owens.

The label releases recordings in a wide variety of formats, including but not limited to CD, digital, vinyl, flexi discs, cylinders and more. Some are limited editions; however, most are widely available through regular retail outlets worldwide. Billboard noted the "great historical significance" of Omnivore's limited-edition release in April 2012 of a rare recording of Buck Owens performing at the White House for President Lyndon Johnson in 1968.

Omnivore also acquires vintage master recordings and publishing catalogues from defunct companies. These include the Nighthawk Records, Chariot Records and Ru-Jac Records labels, and the Blackheart Music Publishing catalog and others.

In December 2023, Omnivore signed a distribution deal with Warner Music Group's ADA Worldwide.

== Mastering & Restoration ==
Omnivore has employed a variety of engineers in its restoration of vintage recordings, with multi-Grammy winner Michael Graves of Los Angeles’ Osiris Studio and Grammy nominated Jordan McLeod of Nashville's Osiris Studio serving as the company’s primary restoration and mastering engineers. Jeff Powell at Take Out Vinyl in Memphis cuts most of the company’s vinyl releases.

== Awards ==
Omnivore's first Grammy-winning release was Hank Williams' The Garden Spot Programs, 1950, which won a 2014 Grammy Award for Best Historical Album. The award recognized producers Colin Escott and Cheryl Pawelski, and audio engineer Michael Graves. Omnivore’s second Grammy-winning release in 2021 was Mister Rogers - It’s Such A Good Feeling: The Best Of Mister Rogers recognizing the producers Cheryl Pawelski and Lee Lody, and audio engineer Michael Graves. Other award-winning Omnivore releases include Bobby Rush's Chicken Heads: A 50-Year History Of Bobby Rush (2017 Blues Foundation Awards, Best Historical or Vintage Recording; 2017 Living Blues Awards, Best Historical Post-War Album), The Motels' Apocalypso (2012 Independent Music Awards, Best Reissue) and Jeffrey Gaines' Alright (2018 PureM Music Awards USA, Best New Album).

== Select discography ==
- Edie Adams, The Edie Adams Christmas Album featuring Ernie Kovacs, 2012
- Arthur Alexander, Arthur Alexander, 2017
- America, Heritage: Home Recordings/Demos 1970–1973, 2017
- America, Heritage II: Demos/Alternate Takes 1971–1976, 2020
- Sam Amidon, But This Chicken Proved Falsehearted, 2015
- Derrick Anderson, A World of My Own, 2017
- The Babys, “Live at the Bottom Line 1979”, 2024
- David Ball, Thinkin' Problem, 2019
- David Ball, Thinkin' Problem Demos Digital EP, 2019
- The Bangles, Ladies and Gentlemen... The Bangles!, 2016
- Bash & Pop, Friday Night is Killing Me, 2017
- The Beach Boys, Becoming The Beach Boys: The Complete Hite & Dorinda Morgan Sessions, 2016
- Chris Bell, I Am the Cosmos, 2017
- Chris Bell, Looking Forward: The Roots of Big Star, 2017
- Chris Bell, The Complete Chris Bell, 2017
- Cindy Lee Berryhill, The Adventurist, 2017
- Cindy Lee Berryhill, Garage Orchestra, 2019
- Cindy Lee Berryhill, Straight Outta Marysville, 2019
- Big Star, Third [Test Pressing Edition], 2011
- Big Star, Nothing Can Hurt Me soundtrack, 2013
- Big Star, Live in Memphis, 2014
- Big Star, Jesus Christ 7″, 2015
- Big Star, Complete Third, 2016
- Big Star, Live at Lafayette's Music Room, 2018
- Big Star, Live on WLIR, 2019
- Big Star, In Space, 2019
- Bird Streets, Bird Streets, 2018
- The Blind Boys of Alabama, Higher Ground, 2016
- The Blind Boys of Alabama, Spirit of the Century, 2016
- The Blind Boys of Alabama, Atom Bomb, 2016
- The Blind Boys of Alabama, Go Tell It on the Mountain, 2016
- Blood, Sweat & Tears, concert soundtrack to What the Hell Happened to Blood, Sweat & Tears? plus companion film score. 2023
- The Bo-Keys, Heartaches by the Number, 2016
- Cait Brennan, Third, 2017
- Tom Brumley and The Buckaroos, Steelin' the Show, 2018
- The Buckaroos, The Buckaroos Play Buck & Merle, 2013
- Tim Buckley, Wings: The Complete Singles 1966–1974, 2016
- Sandy Bull, Steel Tears/Endventions & Tributes, 2018
- Junior Byles, Rasta No Pickpocket, 2018
- Camper Van Beethoven, Our Beloved Revolutionary Sweetheart, 2014
- Camper Van Beethoven, Key Lime Pie, 2014
- Camper Van Beethoven, New Roman Times, 2015
- Peter Case, Hwy. 62, 2015
- Peter Case, Peter Case, 2016
- Peter Case, On the Way Downtown: Recorded Live on FolkScene, 2017
- Tania Chen with Thurston Moore, David Toop, Jon Leidecker, John Cage, Electronic Music for Piano, 2018
- Alex Chilton, Free Again: The "1970" Sessions, 2012
- Alex Chilton, All We Ever Got from Them Was Pain 7″, 2012
- Alex Chilton, A Man Called Destruction, 2017
- Alex Chilton, My Rival 10″, 2019
- The Choir, Artifact: The Unreleased Album, 2018
- The Choir, Last Call: Live at the Music Box, 2020
- Gene Clark, Here Tonight: The White Light Demos, 2013
- Gene Clark, Gene Clark Sings for You, 2018
- Todd Cochran, Worlds Around the Sun, 2014
- Dennis Coffey, One Night at Morey's: 1968, 2018
- Dennis Coffey, Live at Baker's, 2019
- Lloyd Cole, Standards, 2014
- Continental Drifters, Drifted: In the Beginning & Beyond, 2015
- Vivian Cook, The Long Shot, 2017
- Johnny Costa, Johnny Costa Plays Mister Rogers' Neighborhood Jazz, 2019
- The Crests featuring Johnny Maestro, The Best of the Crests featuring Johnny Maestro: 16 Fabulous Hits, 2020
- Culture, The Nighthawk, 2019
- Bobby Darin & Johnny Mercer, Two of a Kind, 2017
- Darondo, Listen to My Song: The Music City Sessions, 2011
- Ronnie Davis and Idren, Come Straight, 2020
- The dB's and Friends, Christmas Time Again!, 2015
- Dead Rock West, More Love, 2017
- Carmaig de Forest, I Shall Be Re-Released, 2017
- Dion, Recorded Live at the Bitter End, August 1971, 2015
- Dr. John, The Atco/Atlantic Singles 1968–1974, 2015
- The Dream Syndicate, The Day Before Wine and Roses, 2014
- The Dream Syndicate, The Days of Wine and Roses, 2015
- The Duprees, The Coed Singles, 2020
- The Duprees, The Coed Albums: You Belong to Me/Have You Heard, 2020
- East Of Venus, Memory Box, 2016
- David "Honeyboy" Edwards, I'm Gonna Tell You Somethin' That I Know: Live at the G Spot, 2017
- Ethiopian & Gladiators, Dread Prophet, 2020
- Ethiopian & His All Stars, The Return of Jack Sparrow, 2020
- Fastball, All the Pain Money Can Buy: 20th Anniversary Edition, 2018
- Maynard Ferguson, Storm, 2015
- Maynard Ferguson, Live from San Francisco, 2015
- Maynard Ferguson, Body & Soul, 2016
- Maynard Ferguson, Big Bop Nouveau, 2016
- Maynard Ferguson, The Complete High Voltage, 2016
- Neil Finn/Paul Kelly, Goin' Your Way, 2015
- Dom Flemons, Prospect Hill: The American Songster Omnibus, 2020
- Peter Frampton, Premonition, 2015
- Peter Frampton, When All the Pieces Fit, 2015
- Peter Frampton, Now, 2015
- Jeffrey Gaines, Alright, 2018
- Game Theory, Blaze of Glory, 2014
- Game Theory, Dead Center, 2014
- Game Theory, Pointed Accounts of People You Know, 2014
- Game Theory, Distortion, 2014
- Game Theory, Real Nighttime, 2015
- Game Theory, Lolita Nation, 2016
- Game Theory, The Big Shot Chronicles, 2016
- Game Theory, Two Steps from the Middle Ages, 2017
- Game Theory, Across the Barrier of Sound: PostScript, 2020
- Gene & Eddie, True Enough: Gene & Eddie with Sir Joe at Ru-Jac, 2016
- Don Gibson, The Best of the Hickory Records Years (1970–1978), 2018
- Allen Ginsberg, The Last Word on First Blues, 2016
- Allen Ginsberg, The Complete Songs of Innocence and Experience, 2017
- The Gladiators, Full Time, 2017
- The Gladiators, Symbol of Reality, 2018
- The Gladiators, Serious Thing, 2020
- Andrew Gold, The Late Show: Live 1978, 2015
- Andrew Gold, Something New: Unreleased Gold, 2020
- Steve Goodman, Artistic Hair, 2019
- Steve Goodman, Santa Ana Winds, 2019
- Steve Goodman, Unfinished Business, 2020
- Steve Goodman, Live '69, 2020
- Joe Grushecky and the Houserockers, Can't Outrun a Memory, 2024
- Joe Grushecky, Houserocker: A Joe Grushecky Anthology, 2024
- Guadalcanal Diary, At Your Birthday Party, 2018
- Vince Guaraldi, Oh, Good Grief!, 2018
- Vince Guaraldi, The Complete Warner Bros.–Seven Arts Recordings, 2018
- Arlo Guthrie, Alice: Before Time Began, 2018
- Arlo Guthrie, Alice's Restaurant: Original MGM Motion Picture Soundtrack (50th Anniversary Edition), 2019
- Woody Guthrie with Ani DiFranco, Tom Morello and Jeff Tweedy, I Don't Like the Way This World's A-Treatin' Me, 2019
- Tony Hadley, The Christmas Album, 2016
- Merle Haggard, Capitol Rarities, 2012
- Merle Haggard, The Complete '60s Capitol Singles, 2013
- Luke Haines & Peter Buck, Beat Poetry for Survivalists, 2020
- Carl Hall, You Don't Know Nothing About Love: The Loma/Atlantic Recordings, 2015
- John Wesley Harding, Greatest Other People's Hits, 2018
- Bobby Hatfield, Stay with Me: The Richard Perry Sessions, 2020
- The Heaters, American Dream: The Portastudio Recordings, 2016
- Judy Henske & Jerry Yester, Farewell Aldebaran, 2016
- Chris Hillman, The Asylum Years, 2018
- Justin Hinds, Know Jah Better, 2018
- Justin Hinds and the Dominoes, Travel with Love, 2019
- Peter Holsapple, Game Day, 2018
- Peter Holsapple Combo, Christmas Must Be Tonight 7″, 2019
- Peter Holsapple vs. Alex Chilton, The Death of Rock, 2018
- Peter Holsapple & Chris Stamey, Our Back Pages, 2020
- Humble Pie, Performance: Rockin' the Fillmore—The Complete Recordings, 2013
- Wanda Jackson, Capitol Rarities, 2012
- Wanda Jackson, The Best of the Capitol Singles, 2013
- Jan and Dean, Filet Of Soul Redux: The Rejected Master Recordings, 2017
- Bert Jansch, Heartbreak, 2012
- Bert Jansch, Live at McCabe's Guitar Shop, 2012
- Winston Jarrett and the Righteous Flames, Jonestown, 2018
- Jellyfish, Spilt Milk, 2012
- Jellyfish, Live at Bogart's, 2012
- Jellyfish, Radio Jellfyish, 2013
- Jellyfish, Bellybutton, 2015
- Jellyfish, Bellybutton Demos, 2015
- George Jones, United Artists Rarities, 2012
- George Jones, The Complete United Artists Solo Singles, 2013
- The Kingbees, The Kingbees, 2015
- The Kingbees, The Big Rock, 2016
- Chip & Tony Kinman, Sounds Like Music, 2019
- The Knack, Havin’ a Rave-Up! Live in Los Angeles, 1978, 2012
- The Knack, Rock & Roll is Good For You: The Fieger/Averre Demos, 2012
- The Knack, Midnight Misogynist 7″, 2012
- The Knack, Zoom, 2015
- The Knack, Normal as the Next Guy, 2015
- The Knack, Live from the Rock 'n' Roll Fun House, 2015
- Ernie Kovacs, Ernie Kovacs Presents Percy Dovetonsils... thpeaks, 2012
- Ernie Kovacs, Ernie Kovacs Presents: A Percy Dovetonsils Chrithmath, 2013
- Ernie Kovacs, The Ernie Kovacs Album: Centennial Edition, 2019
- Robert Lamm, Time Chill: A Retrospective, 2017
- The Legal Matters, An Intro..., 2016
- The Legal Matters, Conrad, 2016
- Lone Justice, This Is Lone Justice: The Vaught Tapes 1983, 2014
- Lone Justice, The Western Tapes 1983, 2018
- Lone Justice, Live at the Palomino 1983, 2019
- The Long Ryders, Psychedelic Country Soul, 2019
- The Long Ryders, Walls (Single Edit) 7″, 2019
- The Lyman Family with Lisa Kindred, American Avatar: Love Comes Rolling Down, 2018
- Malawi Mouse Boys, Forever is 4 You, 2016
- Malo, Latin Bugaloo: The Warner Bros. Singles, 2018
- Iain Matthews, The Art of Obscurity, 2014
- Iain Matthews, Stealin' Home, 2014
- Iain Matthews & Egbert Deríx, in the Now, 2014
- Iain Matthews & Searing Quartet, Joy Mining, 2014
- Les McCann, Invitation to Openness, 2015
- Kate and Anna McGarrigle, Pronto Monto, 2016
- MC Lyte, Legend, 2015
- The Miamis, We Deliver: The Lost Band of the CBGB Era (1974-1979), 2016
- Mister Rogers, Bedtime, 2019
- Mister Rogers, You are Special, 2019
- Mister Rogers, It's Such a Good Feeling: The Best of Mister Rogers, 2020
- Mister Rogers, You're Growing, 2020
- Mister Rogers, Coming and Going, 2020
- Bob Mould, Workbook, 2014
- The Motels, Apocalypso, 2011
- The Motels, Apocalypso Demos EP, 2011
- The Muffs, The Muffs, 2015
- The Muffs, The Muffs Demos, 2015
- The Muffs, Blonder and Blonder, 2016
- The Muffs, Happy Birthday to Me, 2017
- The Muffs, No Holiday, 2019
- Geoff & Maria Muldaur, Pottery Pie, 2018
- Geoff & Maria Muldaur, Sweet Potatoes, 2018
- Ron Nagle, Bad Rice, 2015
- Ron Nagle, Pre-Cooked/Converted: The Bad Rice Demos, 2015
- New Riders of the Purple Sage, Thanksgiving In New York City, 2019
- New Riders of the Purple Sage, Field Trip, 2020
- Harry Nilsson, Losst and Founnd, 2019
- NRBQ, High Noon: A 50-Year Retrospective, 2017
- NRBQ, Happy Talk, 2017
- NRBQ, NRBQ, 2018
- NRBQ, April Showers, 2018
- NRBQ, All Hopped Up, 2018
- NRBQ, Turn On, Tune In, 2019
- NRBQ, Do the Primal Thing, 2020
- Old 97's, They Made a Monster: The Noise Trade EP, 2012
- Old 97's, Too Far to Care, 2012
- Old 97's, They Made a Monster: The Too Far to Care Demos, 2012
- Old 97's, Hitchhike to Rhome, 2014
- Old 97's & Waylon Jennings, Old 97's & Waylon Jennings, 2013
- Buck Owens, Coloring Book EP, 2012
- Buck Owens, Close Up the Honky Tonks 7″, 2012
- Buck Owens, "Live" at the White House (...And in Space), 2012
- Buck Owens, Buck Sings Eagles Digital EP, 2012
- Buck Owens, Honky Tonk Man: Buck Sings Country Classics, 2012
- Buck Owens, Buck 'Em! The Music of Buck Owens (1955-1967), 2013
- Buck Owens, Classic #1 Hits, 2015
- Buck Owens, Buck 'Em! Volume Two: The Music of Buck Owens (1967-1975), 2015
- Buck Owens and the Buckaroos, The Complete Capitol Singles: 1957–1966, 2016
- Buck Owens and the Buckaroos, The Complete Capitol Singles: 1967–1970, 2018
- Buck Owens, Country Singer's Prayer, 2018
- Buck Owens and the Buckaroos, The Complete Capitol Singles: 1971–1975, 2019
- Buck Owens and the Buckaroos, The Complete Capitol Singles: 1957-1975, 2020
- Winfield Parker, Mr. Clean: Winfield Parker at Ru-Jac, 2016
- Jaco Pastorius, Modern American Music... Period! The Criteria Sessions, 2014
- Jaco Pastorius, Jaco: Original Soundtrack, 2016
- Bobby Patterson, I Got More Soul!, 2014
- Art Pepper, Neon Art: Volume One, 2012
- Art Pepper, Neon Art: Volume Two, 2012
- Art Pepper, Neon Art: Volume Three, 2015
- Art Pepper, Art Pepper Presents "West Coast Sessions!" Volume 1: Sonny Stitt, 2017
- Art Pepper, Art Pepper Presents "West Coast Sessions!" Volume 2: Pete Jolly, 2017
- Art Pepper, Art Pepper Presents "West Coast Sessions!" Volume 3: Lee Konitz, 2017
- Art Pepper, Art Pepper Presents "West Coast Sessions!" Volume 4: Bill Watrous, 2017
- Art Pepper, Art Pepper Presents "West Coast Sessions!" Volume 5: Jack Sheldon, 2017
- Art Pepper, Art Pepper Presents "West Coast Sessions!" Volume 6: Shelly Manne, 2017
- Art Pepper, Promise Kept: The Complete Artists House Recordings, 2019
- The Art Pepper Quartet, The Art Pepper Quartet, 2017
- Linda Perhacs, I'm a Harmony, 2017
- Permanent Green Light, Hallucinations, 2018
- Sam Phillips, Martinis and Bikinis, 2012
- Leroy Jodie Pierson, Rusty Nail, 2019
- Plainsong, Reinventing Richard: The Songs of Richard Fariña, 2015
- Bonnie Pointer, Like a Picasso, 2011
- The Posies, Failure, 2014
- The Posies, Dear 23, 2018
- The Posies, Frosting on the Beater, 2018
- The Posies, Amazing Disgrace, 2018
- Alan Price, Savaloy Dip: Words & Music by Alan Price, 2015
- Chris Price, Stop Talking, 2017
- Chris Price, Dalmatian, 2018
- Pugwash, A Rose in a Garden Of Weeds: A Preamble Through the History Of Pugwash..., 2014
- Pugwash, Play This Intimately (As if Among Friends), 2015
- Dennis Quaid and the Sharks, Out of the Box, 2018
- Raspberries, Pop Art Live, 2017
- The Rave-Ups, Town + Country, 2016
- Emitt Rhodes, Rainbow Ends, 2016
- Sandra Rhodes, Where's Your Love Been, 2014
- Don Rich, Don Rich Sings George Jones, 2012
- Don Rich and the Buckaroos, That Fiddlin' Man, 2013
- Don Rich and the Buckaroos, Guitar Pickin' Man, 2016
- The Rivieras, The Coed Singles, 2020
- Rock City, See Seven States, 2017
- The Rose Garden, A Trip Through the Garden: The Rose Garden Collection, 2018
- Rosebud, Rosebud, 2017
- Peter Rowan, Dharma Blues, 2014
- Peter Rowan, My Aloha!, 2017
- Bobby Rush, Chicken Heads: A 50-Year History of Bobby Rush, 2015
- Leon Russell, Live in Japan, 2011
- Jorge Santana, Love The Way: The Solo '70s Recordings, 2018
- Scruffy the Cat, The Good Goodbye: Unreleased Recordings 1984-1990, 2014
- The Searchers, Another Night: The Sire Recordings 1979–1981, 2017
- Sid Selvidge, The Cold of the Morning, 2014
- Johnny Shines, The Blues Came Falling Down: Live 1973, 2019
- Sneakers, Sneakers, 2014
- The Sneetches, Form of Play: A Retrospective, 2017
- Soul Asylum, The Twin/Tone Years, 2018
- Soul Asylum, Say What You Will... Everything Can Happen, 2018
- Soul Asylum, Made to Be Broken, 2019
- Soul Asylum, While You Were Out, 2019
- Soul Asylum, Clam Dip & Other Delights, 2019
- Soul Asylum, Twin/Tone Extras, 2019
- JD Souther, John David Souther, 2016
- JD Souther, Black Rose, 2016
- JD Souther, Home by Dawn, 2016
- Spain, The Blue Moods of Spain, 2012
- Spain, I Believe, 2012
- Spain, She Haunts My Dreams, 2012
- Chris Stamey and the ModRec Orchestra, New Songs for the 20th Century, 2019
- Chris Stamey and the Fellow Travelers, A Brand-New Shade of Blue, 2020
- Harry Dean Stanton, Harry Dean Stanton: Partly Fiction, 2014
- The Staple Singers, Let's Do It Again: Original Soundtrack, 2020
- The Staples, Family Tree, 2020
- The Staples, Pass it On, 2020
- The Staples, Unlock Your Mind, 2020
- John Stewart, Old Forgotten Altars: The 1960s Demos, 2020
- Roger Taylor, Best, 2014
- Roger Taylor, The Lot, 2014
- Roger Taylor, Fun in Space, 2015
- Roger Taylor, Strange Frontier, 2015
- Roger Taylor, Journey's End, 2017
- Nino Tempo, Purveyor of Balladry: The Best of Nino Tempo on Atlantic, 2018
- 10,000 Maniacs, Playing Favorites, 2016
- The Textones, Midnight Mission, 2015
- The Textones, Cedar Creek, 2015
- Billy Thermal, Billy Thermal, 2014
- Linda Thompson, Linda Thompson Presents My Mother Doesn't Know I'm on the Stage, 2018
- Richard Thompson, Strict Tempo!, 2011
- Three Hits, Pressure Dome, 2013
- The Three O'Clock, The Hidden World Revealed, 2013
- Translator, Sometimes People Forget, 2015
- Henry Townsend, "Mule", 2018
- Henry Townsend and Roosevelt Sykes, Blues Piano and Guitar, 2019
- Trip Shakespeare, Are You Shakespearienced?, 2014
- Trip Shakespeare, Applehead Man, 2014
- TV Eyes, TV Eyes, 2014
- The Two Things in One, Together Forever: The Music City Sessions, 2011
- Uncle Walt's Band, Anthology: Those Boys From Carolina, They Sure Enough Could Sing…, 2018
- Uncle Walt's Band, Uncle Walt's Band, 2019
- Uncle Walt's Band, An American in Texas, 2019
- Unicorn, Laughing Up Your Sleeve, 2018
- Van Duren, Grow Yourself Up, 2018
- Van Duren, Waiting: The Van Duren Story (Original Documentary Soundtrack), 2019
- Townes Van Zandt, Sunshine Boy: The Unheard Studio Sessions & Demos 1971–1972, 2013
- Townes Van Zandt, High, Low and In Between, 2013
- Townes Van Zandt, The Late Great Townes Van Zandt, 2013
- Dave Van Ronk, Live in Monterey, 2014
- Various Artists, Magic Trip: Ken Kesey's Search for a Kool Place, 2011
- Various Artists, The Music City Sessions, Volume 1: Richmond Experience, 2012
- Various Artists, The Music City Sessions, Volume 2: Super Strut, 2012
- Various Artists, The Music City Sessions, Volume 3: Soul Show, 2012
- Various Artists, Athens, GA-Inside/Out, 2012
- Various Artists, Omnivore/Noise Trade RSD 2013 Sampler, 2013
- Various Artists, The South Side of Soul Street: The Minaret Soul Singles 1967-1976, 2013
- Various Artists, CBGB: Original Motion Picture Soundtrack, 2013
- Various Artists, Live from High Fidelity: The Best of the Podcast Performances, 2014
- Various Artists, Live from High Fidelity: The Best of the Podcast Performances Vol. 2, 2015
- Various Artists, Beale Street Saturday Night, 2015
- Various Artists, Sessions '64!!, 2015
- Various Artists, The Winding Stream: The Carters, the Cashes and the Course of Country, 2015
- Various Artists, Something Got a Hold On Me: The Ru-Jac Records Story, Volume One: 1963–1964, 2017
- Various Artists, Get Right: The Ru-Jac Records Story, Volume Two: 1964–1966, 2017
- Various Artists, Finally Together: The Ru-Jac Records Story, Volume Three: 1966–1967, 2017
- Various Artists, Changes: The Ru-Jac Records Story, Volume Four: 1967–1980, 2017
- Various Artists, The Soul Of Baltimore: The Ru-Jac Records Story 1963–1980, 2018
- Various Artists, International Pop Overthrow: Volume 21, 2018
- Various Artists, International Pop Overthrow: Volume 22, 2019
- Various Artists, Passable In Pink: Official Motion Picture Soundtrack, 2019
- Various Artists, Send I a Lion: A Nighthawk Reggae Joint, 2019
- Velvet Crush, Pre-Teen Symphonies, 2016
- Adam Wade, The Coed Albums: And Then Came Adam/Adam and Evening, 2020
- The Waitresses, Just Desserts: The Complete Waitresses, 2013
- Hank Williams, The Garden Spot Programs, 1950 – Extended Play, 2014
- Hank Williams, The Garden Spot Programs, 1950, 2014
- Brian Wilson and Van Dyke Parks, Orange Crate Art, 2020
- Murry Wilson & Snow, The Break Away EP, 2019
- Steve Wynn, Sketches in Spain, 2014
- Steve Wynn, Kerosene Man, 2018
- Steve Wynn, Dazzling Display, 2018
- Jerry Yester, Pass Your Light Around, 2017
- Yum-Yum, Dan Loves Patti, 2018
