= Linda Perhacs =

American psychedelic folk singer (born 1943)

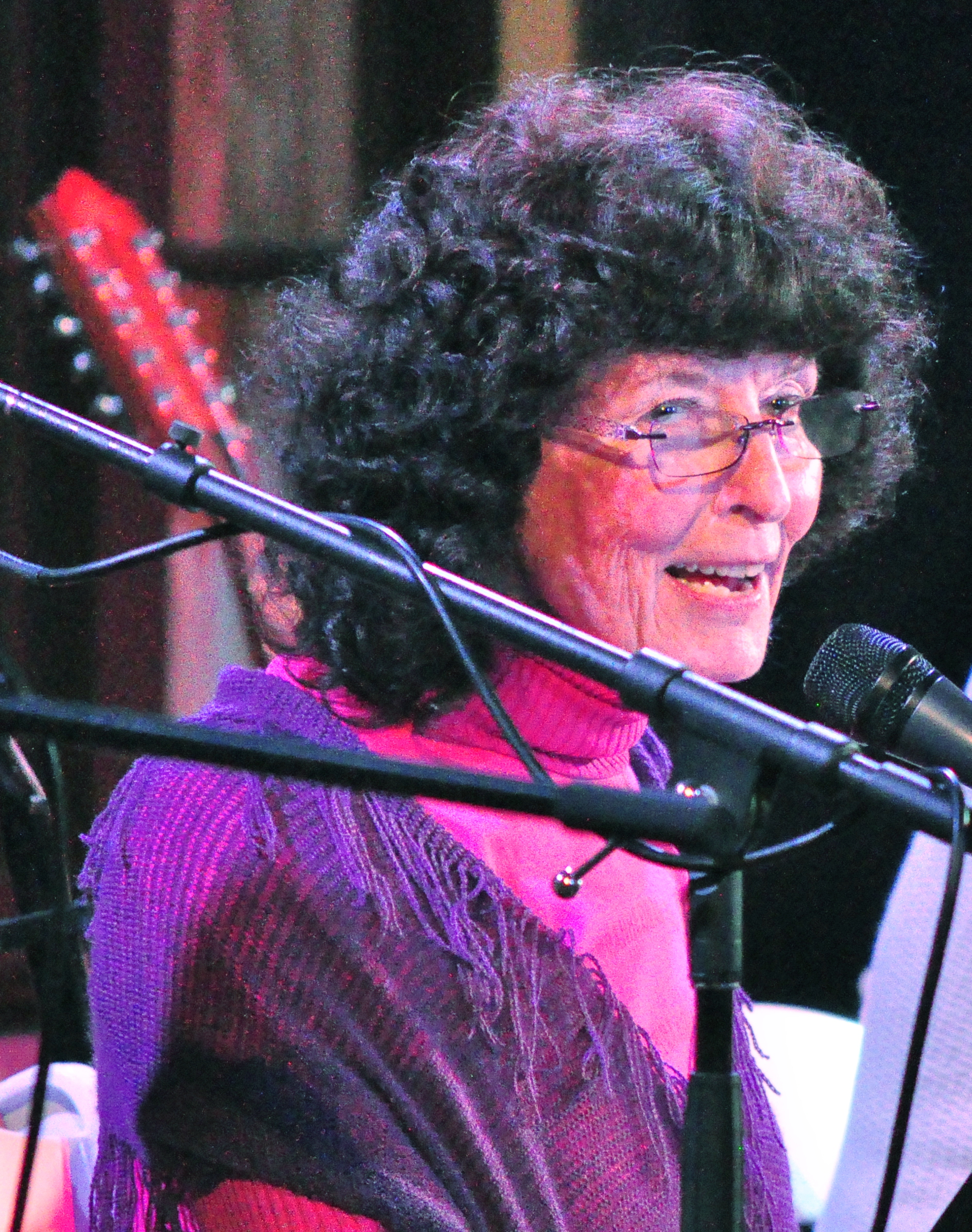
- Perhacs in 2014

Background information
- Born: Linda Jeanne Arnold; September 21, 1943 (age 82); Santa Monica, California, U.S.
- Genres: Psychedelic folk; folk-pop
- Occupations: Singer-songwriter; dental hygienist
- Instruments: Vocals; guitar
- Years active: 1969–1970, 2012–2018
- Labels: Kapp Records; Asthmatic Kitty Records; Omnivore Recordings

Linda Perhacs (born September 21, 1943) is an American psychedelic folk singer, who released her first album, Parallelograms, in 1970 to scant notice or sales. The album was rediscovered by record enthusiasts and reissued numerous times beginning in 1998, growing in popularity with the rise of the New Weird America movement and the Internet. In 2014, she released a second album titled The Soul of All Natural Things, and a third, I'm a Harmony, in 2017.

== Biography ==
Perhacs was born Linda Jeanne Arnold in 1943 in Santa Monica, California, and grew up in Mill Valley. In the late 1960s, Perhacs relocated to Topanga Canyon and worked as a dental hygienist in Beverly Hills under a professor she had met while on a student scholarship at the University of Southern California. In her spare time, she wrote songs. One of her dental clients, Oscar-winning film composer Leonard Rosenman, was impressed by one of her demos and brought her into a studio during 1969–1970, producing her first album, Parallelograms. When the album failed to make an impression, she returned to her dental career.

Michael Piper of folk label the Wild Places, who had first reissued the album in 1998 sourced from the LP, located and contacted Perhacs in 2000, leading to expanded reissues of Parallelograms on CD and vinyl in 2003, sourced from tapes in Perhacs' personal collection. It was reissued again by Sunbeam Records in 2008, by both Mexican Summer and Sundazed Music in 2010, and by Anthology Recordings in 2014.

Following her rediscovery and the reissues, Perhacs returned to recording, and recorded her second album in 2012 and 2013 with producers Chris Price and Fernando Perdomo and collaborators including Julia Holter and Ramona Gonzalez of Nite Jewel. The Soul of All Natural Things was released on March 4, 2014 by Asthmatic Kitty Records.

Her songs have been prominently sampled, including "Chimacum Rain" (by Prefuse 73 for the track "Rain Edit (Interlude)" from the 2005 album Surrounded by Silence, and by Jadakiss for his song "Rain", released on his 2015 "Top 5 Dead or Alive" album) and "Hey, Who Really Cares" (by UK rap artist Lowkey in his song "Who Really Cares", from his 2009 compilation album Uncensored). In 2007, her song "If You Were My Man" was featured on the soundtrack for the film Daft Punk's Electroma.

Perhacs has made several guest appearances on other recordings. She sang backing vocals on "Freely" from Devendra Banhart's Smokey Rolls Down Thunder Canyon (2007), and sang on and cowrote the song "You Wash My Soul" on Mark Pritchard's album Under the Sun (2016).

In March 2016, Perhacs released a new single, "The Dancer", as a preview for her third album. In May 2016, her song "River of God" (from The Soul of All Natural Things) was selected by Land's End for use in a commercial for their Lands' End Canvas line.

Perhacs' third album, I'm a Harmony, was released September 22, 2017 on Omnivore Recordings. Co-produced by Perhacs, Perdomo and Pat Sansone (of Wilco and the Autumn Defense), it features collaborations with artists including Banhart, Pritchard, Holter, Nels Cline and Durga McBroom.

In July 2026, Perhacs was reported as missing by her former manager Laurel Stearns. In an Instagram post, Stearns wrote that Perhacs had disappeared after being discharged from a care facility by her legal guardian eight months previously, and her whereabouts were unknown. Stearns filed a missing persons report with the Los Angeles Police Department on June 6, 2026. Perhacs was found safe on July 29.

== Discography ==
=== Studio albums ===
Title	Details	Peak positions	
Title	Details	US Folk	US Heat
Parallelograms	Released: 1970; Label: Kapp	—	—
The Soul of All Natural Things	Released: March 18, 2014; Label: Asthmatic Kitty	21	33
I’m a Harmony	Released: September 22, 2017; Label: Omnivore	—	—
