= Italian Colombians =

Colombian citizens of Italian descent

Italo-colombiani (Italian) Ítalo-colombianos (Spanish)
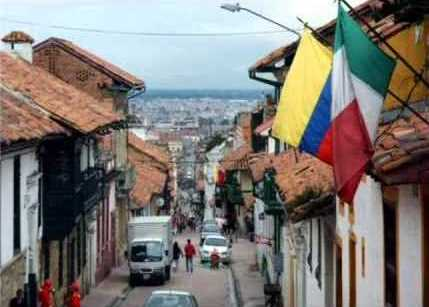
- Flags of Italy and Colombia in Bogotá

Total population
- c. 20,000 (by birth) c. 2,500,000 (by ancestry, corresponding to about 4% of the total population)

Regions with significant populations
- Bogotá,Caribbean Region, Norte de Santander, Santander, Valle del Cauca, Antioquia, Cundinamarca, Boyacá, Colombian coffee growing axis, Huila Department, Cauca Department

Languages
- Colombian Spanish · Italian and Italian dialects

Religion
- Roman Catholicism · Protestantism (Lutheranism · Evangelicalism) · Judaism

Related ethnic groups
- Italians, Italian Americans, Italian Argentines, Italian Bolivians, Italian Brazilians, Italian Canadians, Italian Chileans, Italian Costa Ricans, Italian Cubans, Italian Dominicans, Italian Ecuadorians, Italian Guatemalans, Italian Haitians, Italian Hondurans, Italian Mexicans, Italian Panamanians, Italian Paraguayans, Italian Peruvians, Italian Puerto Ricans, Italian Salvadorans, Italian Uruguayans, Italian Venezuelans

Italian Colombians (Italian: italo-colombiani; Spanish: ítalo-colombianos) are Colombian-born citizens who are fully or partially of Italian descent and Italian-born people in Colombia. Italians have been immigrating to Colombia since the early 16th century.

== History ==
=== Colonial period ===
The presence of Italians in Colombia dates back to the times of Christopher Columbus and Amerigo Vespucci. The very name of Colombia comes from the 'discoverer' of America, idealized by the Venezuelan Francisco de Miranda.

Martino Galeano (member of the noble Galeano Family of Genoa) was one of the most important conquerors of the territory of present-day Colombia (New Kingdom of Granada). As an infantry captain, he directed the military campaign of Pedro Fernández de Lugo, who landed in Santa Marta in 1535. He later founded the town of Vélez, in Santander, being its alderman and co-founder of Bogotá.

In the 18th century, on the ship Santa Rosa, the naval artilleryman Giovanni Andrea Botero arrived from the port of Cádiz to the city of Cartagena de Indias, specifically in January 1716, working in the service of the Spanish crown. The artilleryman Botero was born in the Republic of Genoa, and, due to illness, asked permission, not being a Spaniard, to stay in the territory of the Viceroyalty of New Granada. He traveled to the interior of the country and settled in the municipality of Rionegro, Valley of San Nicolás, Antioquia, where he devoted himself to agriculture and gold mining, founding this family there.

=== Independent Colombia ===
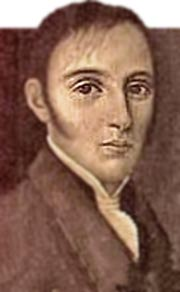
Juan Dionisio Gamba was president of Colombia in 1812

Very few Italians arrived in Colombia before the war of independence led by Simón Bolívar, although several hundred monks came from Italy primarily as priests and missionaries were present in the country.

They have left their mark in many lines of the Colombian colonial society.

Although few, these early Italians were present in almost all higher levels of Colombian society, like Juan Dionisio Gamba, the son of a merchant from Genoa who was president of Colombia in 1812.

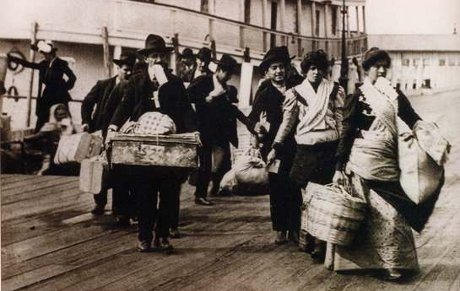
Italians arriving in Puerto Colombia, Atlántico.

....The Italian influence in Colombia was important in science, culture, arts and laws. Furthermore, they created symbols like the country map, the National Hymn and the Capitol. (La influencia italiana fue determinante en la ciencia, la cultura, las artes y el derecho de Colombia. Además, les dieron vida a símbolos como el mapa, el Himno Nacional y el Capitolio.)

— Armando Silva

In the mid-19th century, many Italians arrived from South Italy (especially from the province of Salerno, and the areas of Basilicata and Calabria), on the north coast of Colombia (Barranquilla was the first center affected by this mass migration).

One of the first complete maps of Colombia, adopted today with some modifications, was prepared by another Italian, Agustino Codazzi, who arrived in Bogotá in 1849. The Colonel Agustin Codazzi also proposed the establishment of an agricultural colony of Italians, on the model of what was done with the Colonia Tovar in Venezuela, but some factors prevented this.

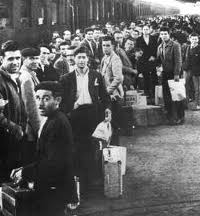
Italians arriving in Colombia

In 1885, diplomatic relations between Italy and Colombia were interrupted for several years. A wealthy businessman in the Italian-Colombian region of Cauca, named Ernesto Cerruti, stood against the oligarchy and the church in favor of a liberal party and local Masonic group. As a result, Bogotá authorities confiscated his property and imprisoned him. This led to a blockade of the port by the Colombian Navy, and Italian emigration to Colombia was partially restricted until 1899.

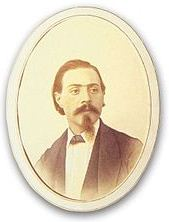
Portrait of the Italian Oreste Sindici (1870), composer of the Colombian national anthem

In November 1887, to commemorate the independence of Cartagena, a fervent song with lyrics by Rafael Núñez was played at Bogotá Variety Theatre, and was subsequently adopted in 1920 as Hymn of the Republic of Colombia. The melody came from someone who had arrived as first tenor in an opera company, the Italian musician Oreste Sindici (May 31, 1828 – January 12, 1904), and who lived the last years of his life in Bogotá.

Sindici was an Italian-born Colombian musician and composer, who composed the music for the Colombian national anthem in 1887. Sindici died in Bogotá on January 12, 1904, due to severe arteriosclerosis. In 1937 the Colombian government honored his memory.

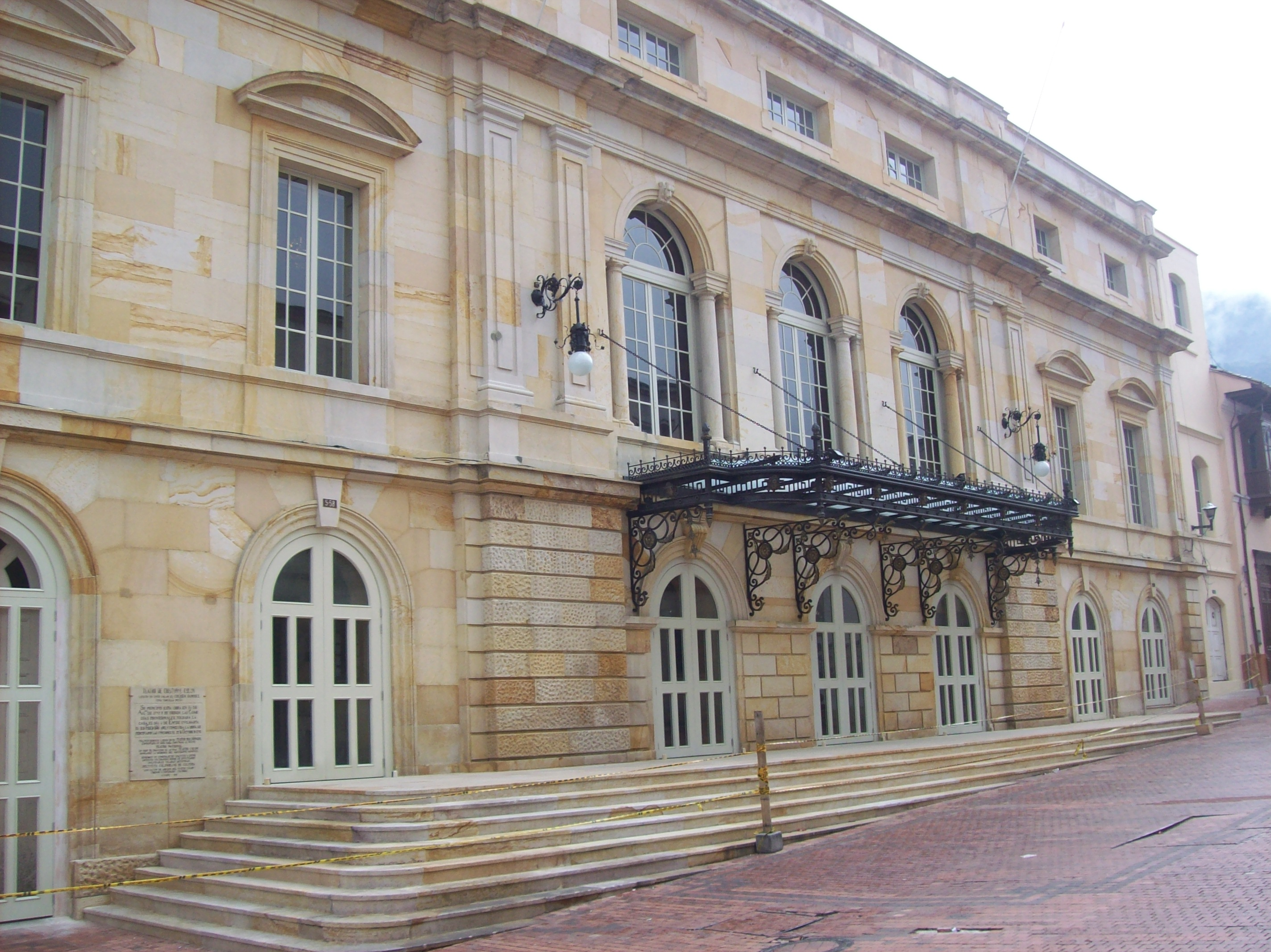
Teatro Colón of Bogotá, created by the Italian architect Pietro Cantini

Some important buildings were created by Italians in the 19th century, like the famous Colón Theater of the capital. It is one of the most representative theaters of Colombia, with a neoclassic architecture built by the Italian architect Pietro Cantini and founded in 1892. This Italian architect also contributed to the construction of the Capitolio Nacional of the capital.

The sculptor Cesare Sighinolfi travelled to Bogotà in 1880, invited by his mentor Pietro Cantini to help decorate the Teatro Cristobal Colon. He made monuments to Christopher Columbus and Isabelle the Catholic (1906). In Bogotá, Cesare Sighinolfi succeeded Alberto Urdaneta, as director of the "School of Fine Arts of Bogotá", teaching alongside Luigi Ramelli and Pietro Cantini. In 1896, in Bogotá, he completed a portrait of Rafael Reyes.

During the conflict between the Italian entrepreneur Ernesto Cerruti and Colombian President Rafael Nuñez faced with the threat of military intervention and international pressure, the Colombian government opted to submit to international arbitration. In 1891, Pope Leo XIII, who was respected in both countries due to widespread Catholicism, intervened as mediator in the conflict. Under Papal arbitration, an agreement was reached in which Colombia was to pay compensation to Cerruti, although in an amount lower than that originally demanded by Italy.

In 1908, according to the relation of the diplomat Agnoli to the Italian Commissary for Emigration, in Colombia there were nearly 1,000 Italians, 400 in Barranquilla, 120 in Bogotá, less than 100 in Cartagena and Bucaramanga, with only a few dozen in Cúcuta and other minor cities. Most of the Italians were from Veneto and Tuscany; their main activity was in commerce and hospitality, but 30 Italians owned huge lands and successful farms.

100,000 Italians arrived in Colombia.

=== World War II ===
After World War II, Italian emigration to Colombia was directed primarily toward Bogotá, Cali, and Medellín, mainly concentrated in the capital region.

== Population ==
In 2019, there were 20,315 Italian citizens residing in Colombia. It is estimated that around 2,500,000 of Colombians have full or partial Italian ancestry, corresponding to about 4% of the total population.

== Culture ==
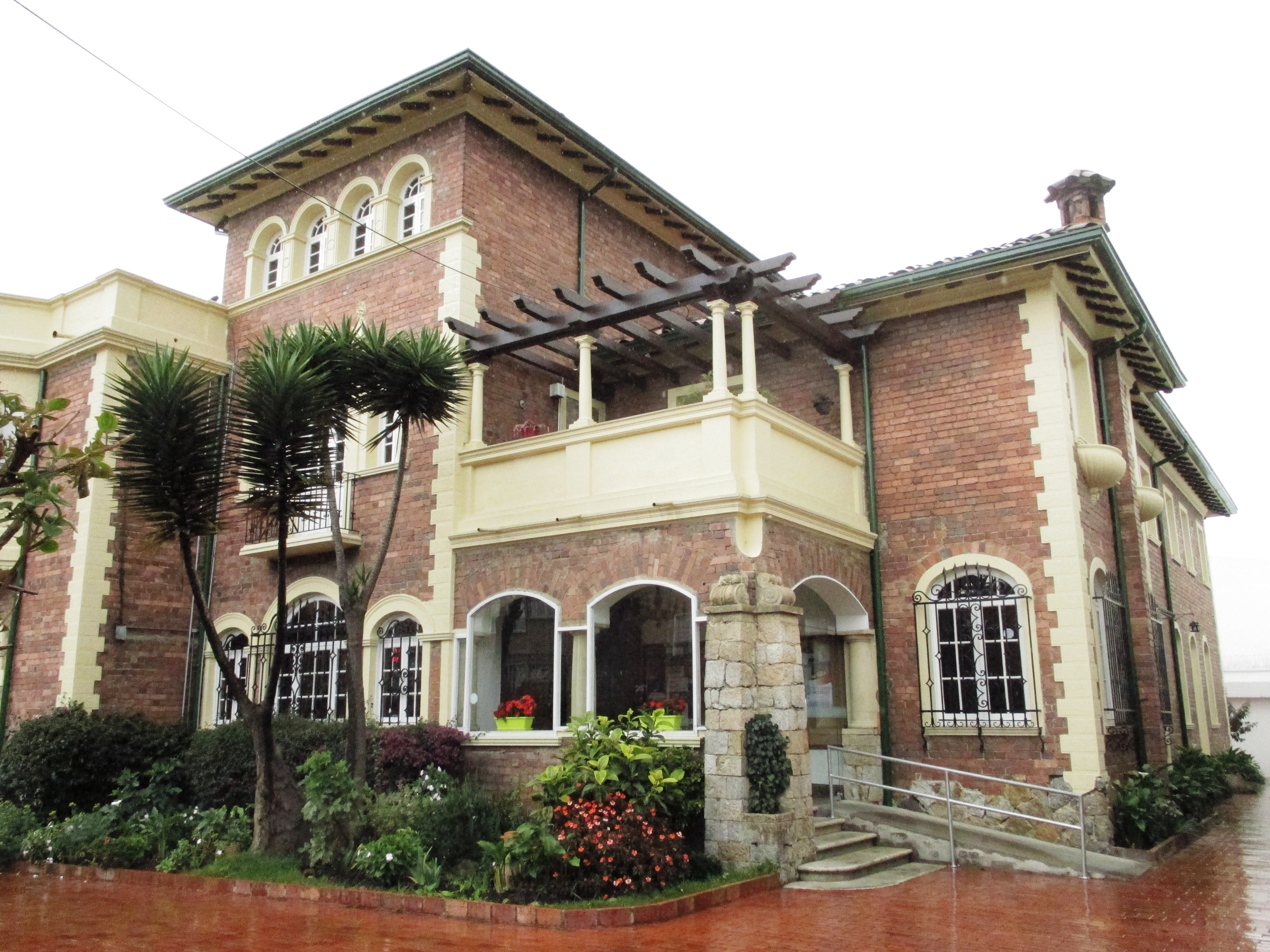
Institute of Italian Culture in the Teusaquillo neighborhood of Bogotá.

There are Italian schools in Bogotá: Colegio Italiano Leonardo da Vinci and Gimnasio Alessandro Volta, in Medellín: Leonardo da Vinci, and in Barranquilla: Galileo Galilei.

Furthermore, there are some institutions promoted by the Italian government, like the Sociedad Dante Alighieri, the Instituto de Cultura italiana and the Casa de Italia in the capital.

=== Language ===
Italian immigrants have integrated easily into Colombian society. Today, the vast majority of their descendants only speak Spanish, the national language of Colombia. As of 2008, approximately 4.3% still spoke (or 'understood a little') Italian.

In the last century, the Italian language has had an influence on some Colombian words.

=== Cuisine ===
Italians brought new recipes and types of food to Colombia but also helped in the development of Colombian cuisine. Spaghetti and pizza are popular foods in current day Colombia originating from Italy. Like in many other countries, the Italian cuisine is widely popular in most cities and many municipalities of Colombia.

== Notable Italian-born people and descendants ==
=== Criminals ===
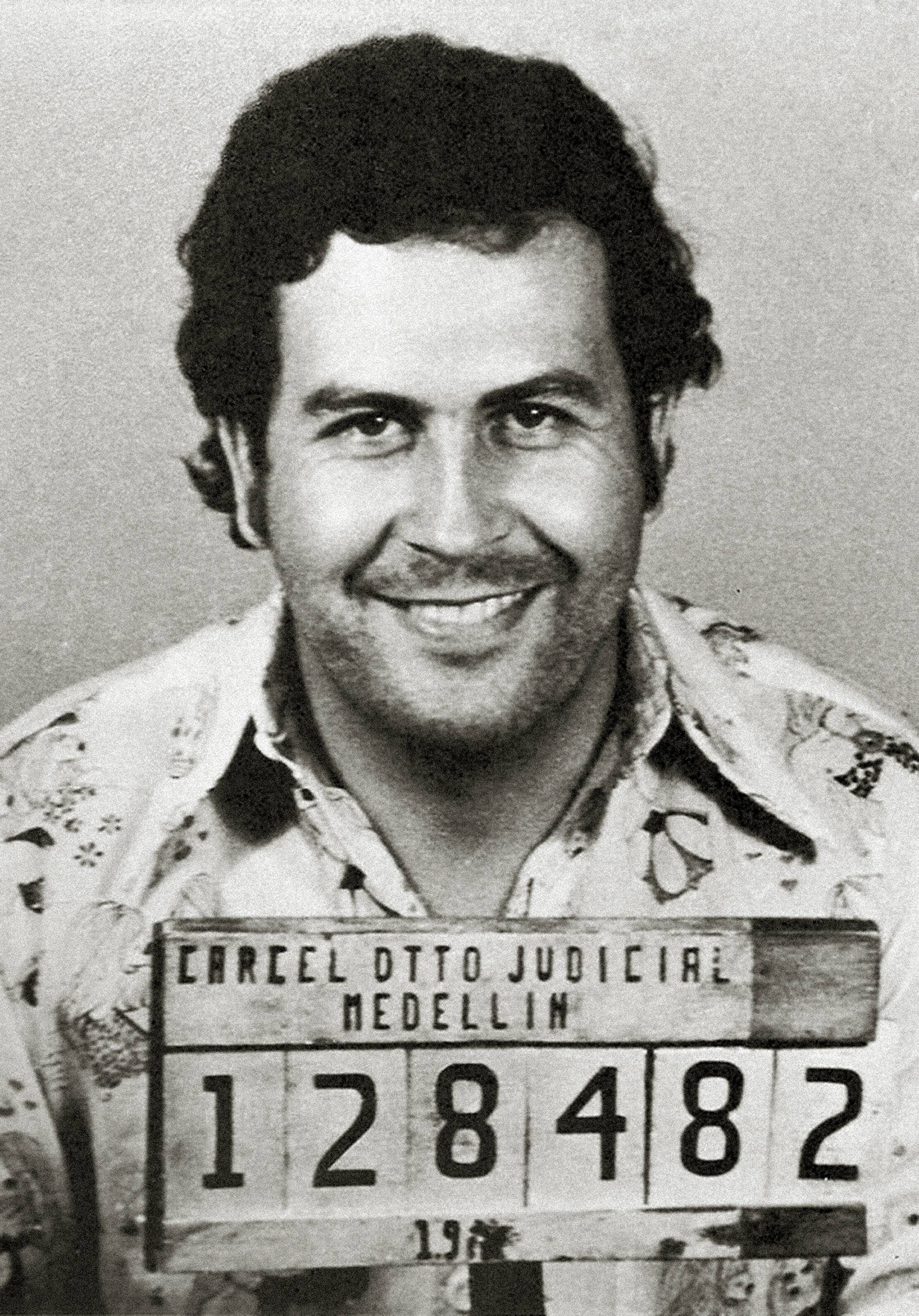
Pablo Escobar, the notorious Colombian drug lord, was captured in a 1976 photograph by the Colombian police.

- Pablo Escobar, Colombian drug lord
- Salvatore Mancuso, paramilitary warlord

=== Architecture ===
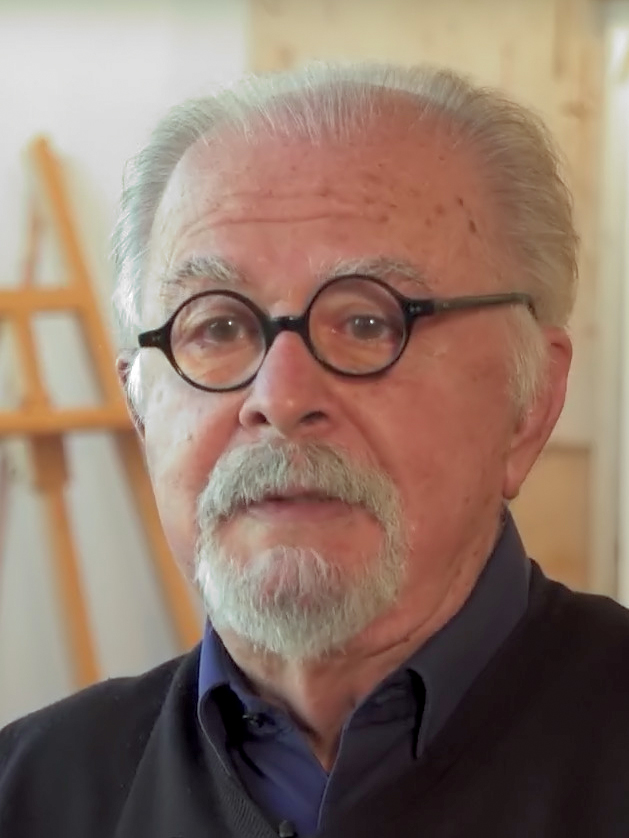
Colombian artist Fernando Botero. All Colombians who bear this surname are descend from an Italian naval gunner, born in the Republic of Genoa.

- Giovanni Buscaglione, architect
- Giancarlo Mazzanti, architect
- Patricio Samper Gnecco, architect, urbanist, and politician

=== Arts and Entertainment ===
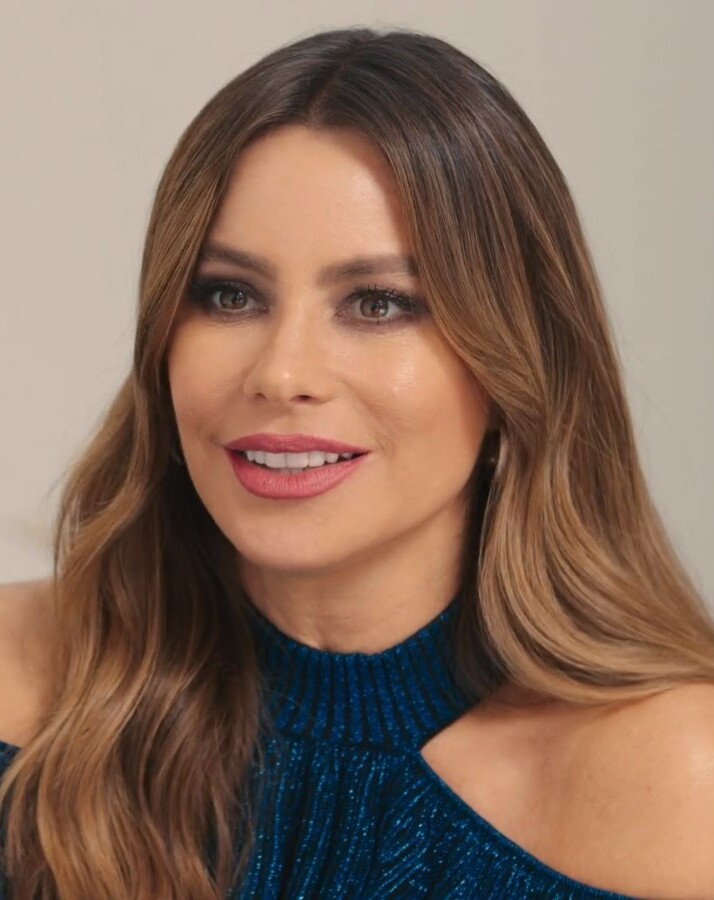
Sofia Vergara, hollywood actress

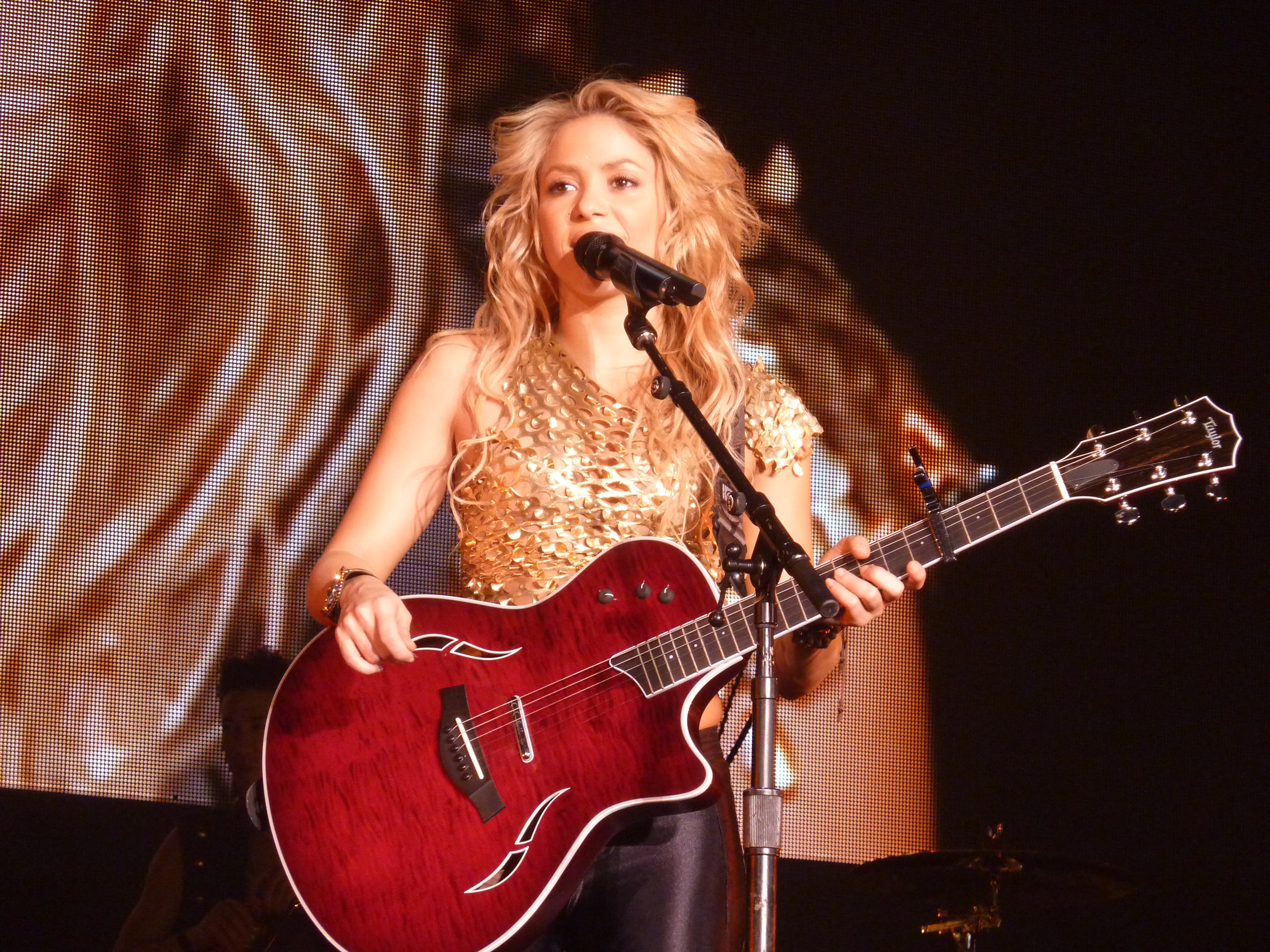
Colombian singer Shakira, in addition to having Lebanese roots, has Italian ancestry on her mother's side.

- Rodolfo Aicardi, singer
- Fernando Botero, draftsman, painter, and sculptor
- María Cecilia Botero, actress and TV presenter
- María Dalmazzo, actress
- Shakira Mebarak Ripoll, singer-songwriter and businesswoman
- Andrea Nocetti, model, actress and Miss Colombia 2000
- Taliana Vargas, model, actress and Miss Colombia 2007 (1st runner-up Miss Universe 2008)
- Sofía Vergara, actress and model
- Charlie Zaa, singer songwriter and businessman.

=== Science & The Arts ===
- Agustín Codazzi, geographer
- Oreste Sindici, musician and composer

=== Politics ===
- Armando Benedetti, politician
- Gustavo Petro, politician (President of Colombia 2022-2026)
- Marta Lucía Ramírez, politician and former Vice-President of Colombia 2018-2022
- Fabio Valencia Cossio, politician
- Armando Samper Gnecco, politician
- Nicholas J Fuentes, political commentator

=== Religion ===
- Tulio Botero, ecclesiastic of the Catholic Church
- Javier de Nicoló, priest and educator
- Mario Revollo Bravo, ecclesiastic of the Catholic Church

=== Sports ===
- Nicolás Benedetti, professional footballer
- Santiago Botero, professional cyclist
- Francisco Cassiani, professional footballer
- Geovanis Cassiani, professional footballer
- Luis Fernando Centi, professional footballer
- Norberto Peluffo, professional footballer, coach, and sports commentator
- Eddie Salcedo, professional footballer
- Tito Puccetti, sports commentator
- Andrés Marocco, sports commentator
- David Ramirez Pisciotti, professional footballer
- Ricardo Ciciliano, former professional footballer

=== Others ===
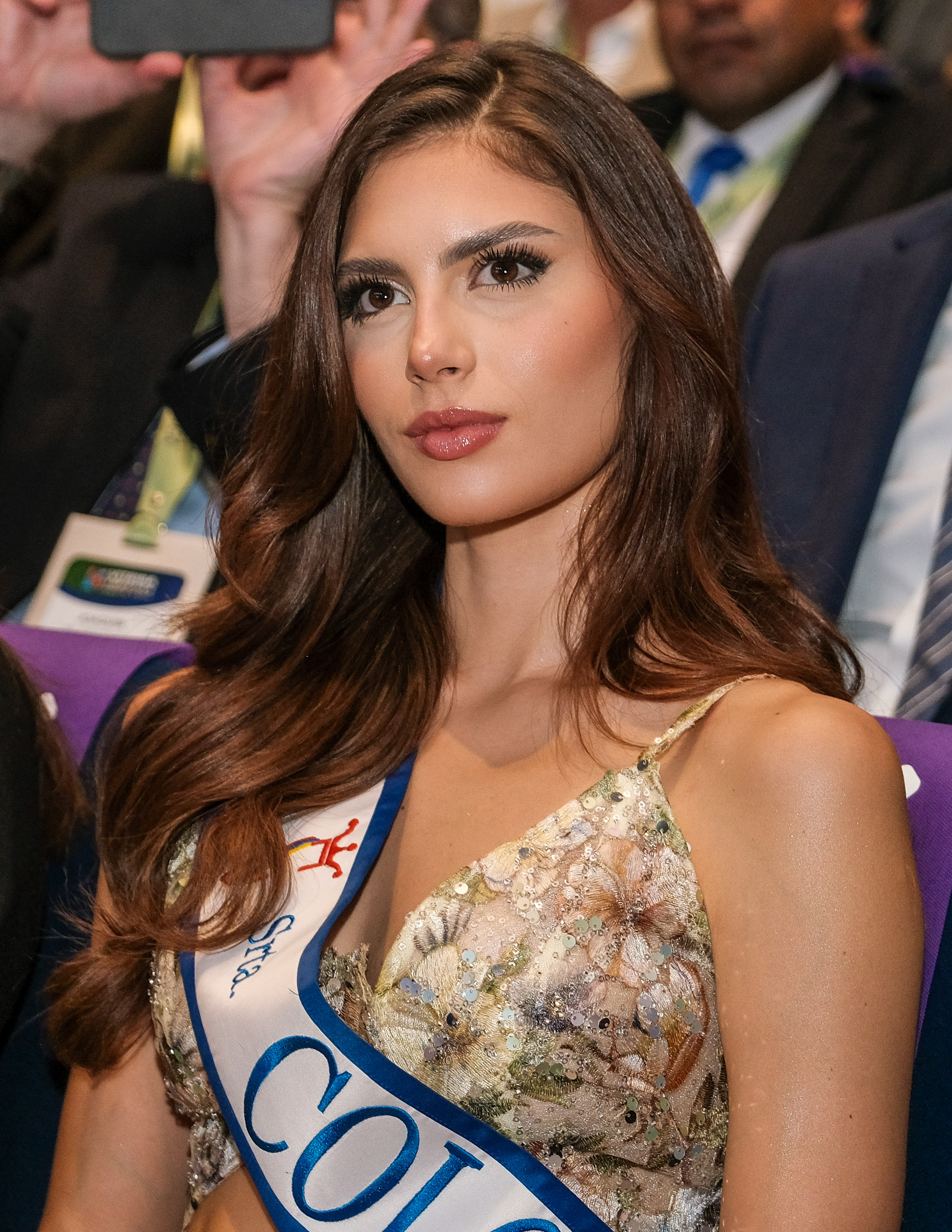
Sofía Osío, Miss Colombia 2022

- Sofía Osío, Miss Colombia 2022 and model
- Valeria Ayos Bossa, Miss Universe Colombia 2021 and model
- Daniella Álvarez, Miss Colombia 2011 and model

== See also ==
- Colombia–Italy relations
- List of Italian explorers
- List of Italian inventors
- Italians
- White Colombians
- White Latin Americans
