= Reinado Internacional del Café 2016 =

- Date: January 9, 2016
- Presenters: Ricardo Orrego; Adriana Betancur; Dahianna Gallego
- Entertainment: Sebastián Yepes
- Venue: Teatro Los Fundadores, Manizales, Colombia
- Broadcaster: Telecafé
- Entrants: 25
- Placements: 5
- Withdrawals: Haiti, Mexico
- Returns: Aruba, Spain, Uruguay, United States
- Winner: Maydeliana Díaz; Venezuela

Reinado Internacional del Café 2016 (International Coffee Queen) beauty pageant, was held in Manizales, Colombia, on January 9, 2016. At the end of the event, the outgoing queen Yuri Uchida, Reina Internacional del Café 2015 from Japan crowned Maydeliana Díaz from Venezuela as her successor.

== Results ==
Award	Contestant
Reina Internacional del Café 2016	Venezuela – Maydeliana Díaz
Virreina Internacional del Café 2016	Brazil – Julia Horta
1st Runner-up	Colombia – Laura Prada
2nd Runner-up	Spain – María José García
3rd Runner-up	United States – Jeslie Mergal

== Special awards ==
Queen of Police	Costa Rica – Lisbeth Valverde; Brazil – Julia Horta; Japan – Nanami Tomita; Spain – María José García; Venezuela – Maydeliana Díaz
Best Legs	Colombia – Laura Prada
Best Hair	Venezuela – Maydeliana Díaz

== Judges ==
- Vanessa Mendoza – Miss Colombia 2001
- Andrés Pajón – Fashion designer
- Natalia Robledo Luna – Editor of Jet Set Magazine

== Contestants ==
Country	Contestant	Age	Hometown
Argentina	María Emilia Colombo Romero	21	San Juan
Aruba	Thalia Gabriela Croes	20	Oranjestad
Bahamas	Danielle Alexandrea Pratt	19	Grand Bahama
Bolivia	Claudia María Tavel Antelo	26	Santa Cruz
Brazil	Julia do Vale Horta	21	Juiz de Fora
Canada	Paola Núñez Valdez	24	Toronto
Chile	Scarlett Slette Astroza Said	20	Santiago
Colombia	Laura Margarita Prada Anaya	24	Bogotá
Costa Rica	Lisbeth Tatiana Valverde Brenes	20	Alajuela
Dominican Republic	Moesha Henríquez Suazo	19	Santiago de los Caballeros
El Salvador	Dayana Scarlet Requeno Juares	21	San Miguel
Germany	Selina Kriechbaum	20	Frankfurt
Guatemala	Marilyn Zuleima Grávez	23	Zacapa
Honduras	Gabriela Vanessa Salazar Valle	23	Tegucigalpa
Japan	Nanami Tomita	25	Chiba
Nicaragua	María Laura Ramírez Castillo	18	Masaya
Panama	Caterine Argelia Agrazal Pinilla	24	Santiago de Veraguas
Paraguay	Katri Analía Villamayor Montiel	20	Ciudad del Este
Peru	Carla Fiorella Vieira Bastidas	26	Lima
Portugal	Inés Brusselmans Ferreira Martins	20	Lisbon
Puerto Rico	Iolette Marie Cruz Rodríguez	19	San Juan
Spain	María José García Breva	21	Huelva
Uruguay	Yuliana Gladys Peixoto Dziekonski	22	Canelones
United States	Jeslie Mergal	23	Miami
Venezuela	Maydeliana Liyimar Díaz Parada	18	Maracay

== Crossovers ==
Contestants who previously competed or will compete at other beauty pageants:

Miss Universe:

- 2014: Bolivia – Claudia Tavel
- 2015: Canada – Paola Núñez
- 2019: Brazil – Júlia Horta

Miss World:

- 2015: Honduras – Gabriela Salazar
- 2016: Nicaragua – María Laura Castillo
- 2019: Portugal – Inês Brusselmans (TBA)

Miss Supranational:

- 2015: Portugal – Inês Brusselmans

Miss Intercontinental:

- 2014: United States – Jeslie Mergal (1st runner-up) (as Cuba)
- 2015: Costa Rica – Lisbeth Valverde

Reina Hispanoamericana:

- 2013: Bolivia – Claudia Tavel (6th runner-up)

Miss United Continents:

- 2014: Honduras – Gabriela Salazar

Miss America Latina del Mundo:

- 2015: Costa Rica – Lisbeth Valverde (4th runner-up)
- 2015: Peru – Carla Vieira (Top 10)

== Notes ==
=== Returns ===
Last competed in 2014:

- Aruba
- Spain
- Uruguay
- United States

=== Withdraws ===
- Haiti
- Mexico
