= Ilja Rosendahl =

- Born: Ilja Martin Rosendahl; 23 February 1968 (age 58); Bochum, West Germany
- Education: University of Bonn
- Occupations: Producer, director, screenwriter, actor, songwriter, musician, voiceover artist
- Years active: 1997–present
- Website: www.iljarosendahl.com

Ilja Rosendahl (born 23 February 1968) is a German film and music producer, director, screenwriter, actor, songwriter, musician (vocals, guitars, bass) and voiceover artist.

== Biography ==
=== Artistic career ===
Rosendahl was born in Bochum. He played in theater projects and sang in a rock band during high school. Since 1997 he has starred in feature films and TV series aired in the United States, Europe and Latin America.

In 2001 he started the American Electronic Alternative Rock solo music project Latent Anxiety in Los Angeles, California which has released 7 studio albums and garnered several awards. He also contributed vocals and guitars to the 2010 Mortal Loom album This Vastness.

In 2021 he gave his debut as director and screenwriter of the short film Remaining Chance.

=== Academic background ===
Rosendahl holds a PhD and BSc in Natural Science with specialization in Radiation Biophysics, Cytology and Genetics and speaks 7 languages (German, English, Spanish, Portuguese, Italian, French, Russian).

== Filmography ==
=== Feature films ===
Year	Film	Role	Notes
2022	Wrong Destination	Herbert George	Producer, writer, director
2021	Remaining Chance	Tim	Producer, writer, director
2017	Faithless		Associate Producer
2016	Wasted Days		Special Thanks
2015	Que Viva la Musica	Andreas	
2013	Forget the Pact		Special Thanks
2011	The Snitch Cartel	Prison Guard	
1999	Our Island in the South Pacific	Stock Broker	
1997	Rossini	Pedestrian	

=== TV series ===
Year	TV Show	Role
2016	Polvo Carnavalero	Peter
2016	Bloque de Búsqueda	Major Stone
2015	Celia	Elegant Man
2015	Quien mato a Patricia Soler?	Agent
2014	El Chivo	Mr. Nelson
2014	Tu Voz Estereo	Milton
2014	En la boca del lobo	Christian Fine
2014	La Viuda Negra	State Attorney
2014	El Corazón del Océano	Ulrico Schmidels
2013	La hipocondríaca	Diego
2013	5 Viudas Sueltas	Banker
2013	La Prepago	Jean Louis
2013	Allá Te Espero	Thomas
2013	La Promesa	Alexei
2012	La Ruta Blanca	Thomas
2012	El Capo 2	State Attorney
2012	Kdabra 3	News Reporter
2011	La Teacher de Inglés	Immigration Officer
2011	La Reina del Sur	Alexej
2011	La Mariposa	Jeff Hall
2011	3 Milagros	Marco Bellini
2011	El Joe "La Leyenda"	Dr. Henríquez
2010	El Cartel 2	DEA Agent
2010	Bella Calamidades	Rody Walpole
2009	Victorinos	Boxing Trainer

=== Dubbing ===
Year	TV Show	Role
2022	L'horizon	Kommissar, Guillaume
2020	John Was Trying to Contact Aliens	John Shepherd

== Discography ==
=== Studio albums ===
Year	Album	By	Notes
2016	Salvation	Latent Anxiety	
2012	Liberation	Latent Anxiety	
2010	Suffocation	Latent Anxiety	
2010	This Vastness	Mortal Loom	Vocals, guitars
2008	Detonation	Latent Anxiety	
2007	Reaction	Latent Anxiety	
2007	Sensation	Latent Anxiety	
2005	Perception	Latent Anxiety	

=== Audiobooks ===
Year	Title	Notes
2017	Der Stummfilmpianist	Narrator (German)
2016	Der Blaue Engel bin ich	Narrator (German)
2015	Deep Sea One - Orden der schwarzen Sonne 2	Narrator (German)
2015	Eisstation Wolfenstein - Orden der schwarzen Sonne 1	Narrator (German)
2015	Nicu der kleinste Vampir - Große Fänge	Narrator (German)
2015	Nicu der kleinste Vampir - Fangzahnlos	Narrator (German)

== Awards and nominations ==
Year	Award	For	Result
2021	Europe Film Festival	Remaining Chance (Best Short Film)	Won
2021	IndieFEST Film Awards	Remaining Chance (Short Film)	Won
2011	Hollywood Music Awards	Message From Hell (Best Music Video)	Won
2010	Hollywood Music Awards	Galley (Best Music Video)	Nominated
2009	Equinox I Music Video and Audio Contest	Love Delirium (Best Song)	Won
2005-2009	Song Of The Year Song & Lyric Writing Competition (several awards)	Latent Anxiety	Won
