= Imagenes =

Imagenes (Images) may refer to:

== Music ==
- Imágenes (band), a Peruvian rock band

=== Albums ===
- Imágenes (Lourdes Robles album)
- Imágenes (Verónica Castro album)
