= Francisco Cassiani =

Colombian footballer (born 1968)

Personal information
- Full name: Francisco Cassiani Gómez
- Date of birth: 22 April 1968 (age 58)
- Place of birth: Arboletes, Columbia
- Position: Defender

Senior career*
Years	Team	Apps	(Gls)
1986-1992	Atlético Nacional		
1993	América de Cali		
1993-1997	Atlético Junior	194	(13)
1998	Rosario Central	10	(0)
1999	Deportes Quindío	15	(1)
1999	Atlético Junior	48	(3)
2000-2001	Santiago Wanderers	10	(0)
2002-2003	Alianza Atlético		
- * Club domestic league appearances and goals

Francisco Cassiani Gómez (Note: In this Spanish name, the first or paternal surname is Cassiani and the second or maternal family name is Gómez.) (born 22 April 1968 in Arboletes, Antioquia), known as Francisco Cassiani, is a Colombian former footballer who played as a centre-back for clubs in Colombia, Argentina, Peru and Chile.

He is the older brother of Geovanis Cassiani.

== Teams ==
- Atlético Nacional 1986–1992
- América de Cali 1993
- Atlético Junior 1993–1997
- Rosario Central 1998
- Deportes Quindío 1999
- Atlético Junior 1999
- Santiago Wanderers 2000–2001
- Alianza Atlético 2002–2003

== Honours ==
Atlético Nacional

- Copa Libertadores: 1989

Santiago Wanderers

- Chilean Primera División: 2001
