= Valentina Rendón =

Colombian actress and singer

- Born: Valentina Rendón Escobar; Manizales, Caldas, Colombia
- Occupations: Actress, singer, model, television host, film & TV writer
- Years active: 1996–present
- Height: 1.68 m (5 ft 6 in)
- Spouse: Haik Gazarian
- Website: www.valentinarendon.com

Valentina Rendón Escobar is a Colombian actress, singer and writer.

Rendón studied industrial design at the Universidad Autónoma de Manizales but, after winning a scholarship offered by RCN TV, went to live to Bogotá to become an actress. She was the lead voice of the pop group Luna verde. Her television debut was in the 1996 series Copas amargas. After several supporting roles on television, her first lead role was in the 1999 telenovela Tabú. She would appear in several telenovelas, series and perform on theatre. She also participated and won the Colombian version of Dancing with the Stars, Bailando por un sueño.

Rendón starred in the 2006 film La voz de las alas.

As of 2009, she stars in the Caracol TV telenovela Bermúdez, opposite Víctor Hugo Cabrera. She also appeared in the 2009 Venezuelan film Venezzia, whose script she wrote with Jörg Hiller.

She is a Scientologist.

== Filmography ==
- Deliver Us from Evil (2014, film)
- Happy Fists (2014, film)
- Allá te espero (2013, telenovela, RCN TV) as Cecilia Restrepo Jaramillo
- Venezzia (2009, film) as Graciela
- Bermúdez (2009, telenovela, Caracol TV) as Silvia Vargas (lead role)
- Cómplices (2008, telenovela, Caracol TV) as Francisca
- Decisiones (2007, anthology series, RTI Colombia/Telemundo)
- Marido a sueldo (2007, telenovela, Teleset/RCN TV) as Tatiana Alvarado
- ¿De qué tamaño es tu amor? (2006, telenovela, Teleset/RCN TV) as Sara (lead role)
- La voz de las alas (2006, film)
- Mesa para tres (2004, telenovela, Caracol TV) as Claudia
- Punto de giro (2003, mini-series, RCN TV) as Diana
- La lectora (2002, TV series, RCN TV) as Lulú
- Pobre Pablo (2000, telenovela, RCN TV) as Cindy Mercedes Casilimas
- Tabú (1999, telenovela, Tevecine/Canal Uno) as Carolina (lead role)
- Me llaman Lolita (1999, telenovela, RCN TV) as Sol Ángela
- Hilos invisibles (1998, TV series, Telecolombia/Canal Uno)
- O todos en la cama (1996, sitcom, RCN TV/Canal A) as Laura
- Copas amargas (1996, TV series, Coestrellas/Canal A) as Silvana Mejía
