= Diego Bertie =

Peruvian actor (1967–2022)

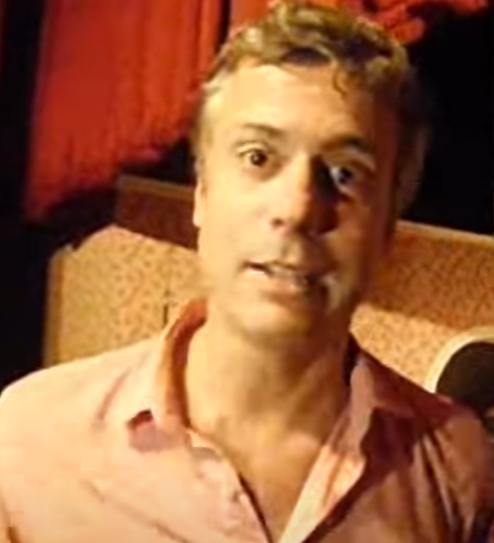
- Born: 2 November 1967; Lima, Peru
- Died: 5 August 2022 (aged 54)
- Occupation: Actor
- Years active: 1987–2022
- Children: Aissa

Diego Felipe Bertie Brignardello (2 November 1967 – 5 August 2022) was a Peruvian actor and singer. His performances spanned in film, theatre and television. He studied at Markham College in Lima, Peru and was also a singer in the mid eighties and had a pop group called Imágenes.

== Telenovelas ==
- Rosa de América (1988) as Ignacio
- El Hombre que Debe Morir as Baby
- Natacha (1990) as Pedro
- Fandango (1992) as Bruno Strombombi
- Escuela de la Calle: Pirañitas (1994) as Sergio
- Canela (1994) as Adrián Helguera
- Obsesión (1996) as Leonardo Ratto
- Pisco Sour (1996)
- La Noche (1997) as Joaquín Falcón
- Leonela, Muriendo de Amor (1997) as Pedro Luis Guerra Morales
- Cosas del amor (1998) as Gonzalo "Chalo" García León
- Amantes de Luna LLena (2000) as Simón Luna
- Cazando a un Millonario (2001) as Felipe Castillo
- Vale Todo (2002) as Ivan
- Eva del Edén (2004) as Roldán de Astorga y Carrasco
- Decisiones (2005) Various roles
- La Ex (2006) as Sergio Estevéz
- Yuru, La Princesa Amazónica (2007) as Leo
- Tiempo Final (2007) as Miguel
- Amas de Casa Desesperadas (2008) as Antonio Guerrero (Tom Scavo)
- Bermúdez (2009) as Gonzalo Lleras
- Los exitosos Gomes (2010) as Martin Gomes
- Al Fondo Hay Sitio (2015) as Sergio Estrada
- El Cazafortunas (2015)
- El Regreso de Lucas (2016) - Honorio Cárdenas
- De vuelta al barrio (2017) as Luis Felipe Sandoval

== Theatre ==
- Annie (1987) opposite Oswaldo Cattone
- Fantástikos
- Simón as Simón Bolívar
- Yepeto as Antonio
- Un Don Juan en el Infierno as Don Juan's son
- Contragolpe
- Eclipse Total as Arthur Rimbaud
- Locos de Amor as Eddie
- Blood Wedding as Leonardo
- Life Is a Dream as Segismundo
- Las Tres Hermanas as Vershinin
- Edipo Rey as Edipo
- El Rey Lear as Edgar
- Fausto (2001)
- La Opera de los Tres Centavos (2003)
- Te Amo María (2004)
- El Jardín Secreto (2007)
- Una Comedia Romana (2008)
- La Jaula de Las Locas (2010)

== Films ==
- Ultra Warrior (1990) as Phil
- Full Fathom Five (1990) as Miguel
- Report on Death (1993)
- Todos Somos Estrellas (1993)
- Muerto De Amor (2002) as Mario
- El Bien Esquivo (2001) as Jerónimo de Ávila
- Bajo La Piel (1996) as Gino Leyva
- Without Compassion (1994) as Ramón Romano
- El Atraco (2004) as Bernal
- Muerto por Muriel (2004) as Bernie
- Crossing a Shadow (2005) as Enrique Aet
- Los Andes no Creen en Dios (2005) as Adolfo
- Pirates in Callao (2005; voice)
- Desierto Infernal
- Batallas En Silencio
- Esto Huele Mal
- ¡Qué difícil es amar! (2018)
- Single, Married, Widowed, Divorced (2022) as Leonardo (posthumous release)
- La herencia de Flora (2024) as Captain Chabrie (final film role, posthumous release)

== Bands ==
- Imágenes
- Diego Bertie
