= Colombia–Italy relations =

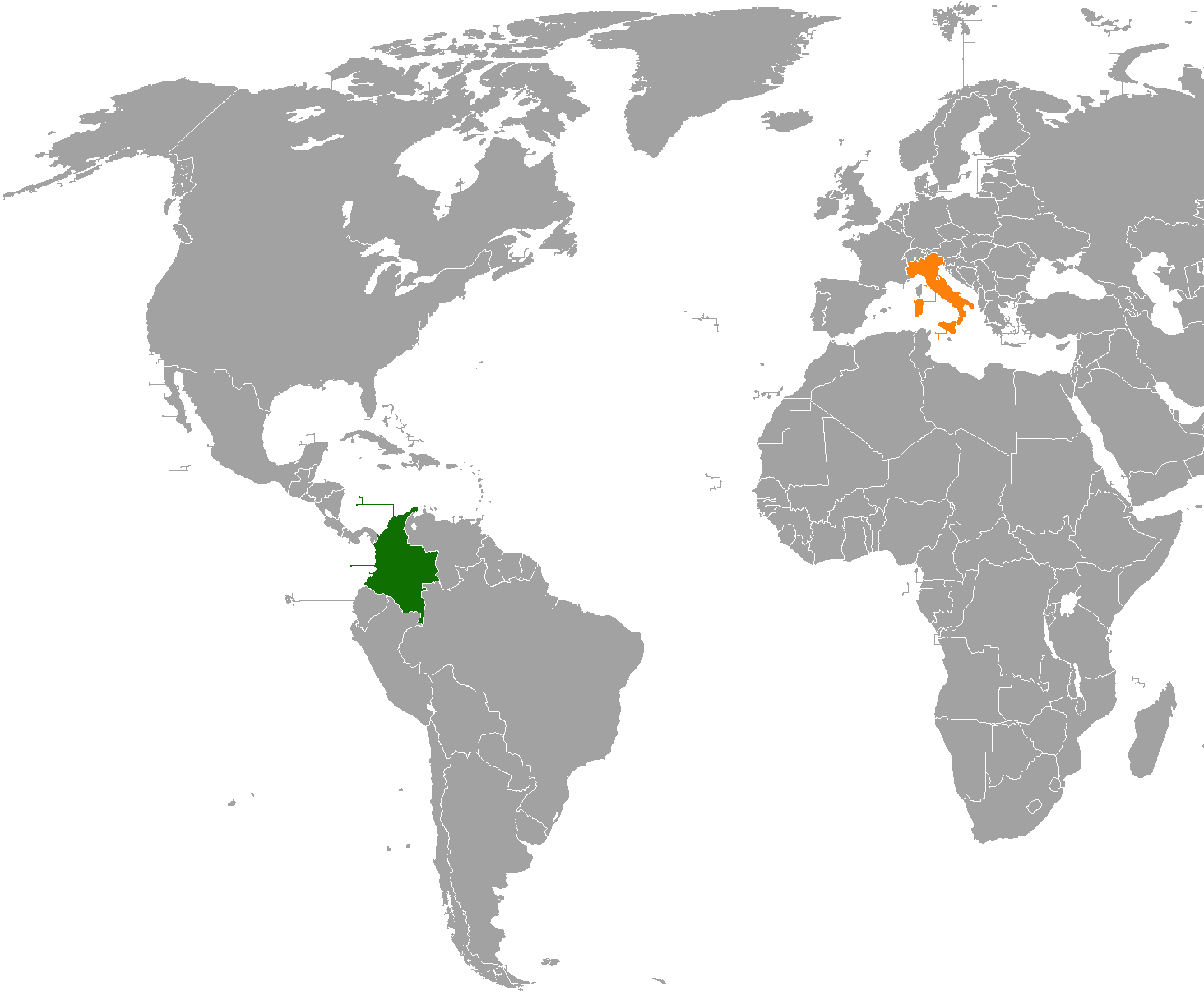
- Colombia: Italy

The Republic of Colombia and the Italian Republic have maintained current and historical relations. Colombia has an embassy in Rome and a consulate-general in Milan, while Italy has an embassy in Bogotá. Both nations are members of the United Nations.

== History ==
In 1502, Italian explorer Christopher Columbus (in the service for Spain) on his fourth voyage encountered the Guna people who inhabit present day Colombia and Panama. Soon afterwards, the land would be christened after Christopher Columbus. In 1819, Colombia obtained its independence from Spain. In 1847 Colombia and Italy established diplomatic relations.

Soon after the establishment of diplomatic relations, Italians began migrating to Colombia. Several thousands arrived to country, most in the early 20th century. During World War II, Colombia broke diplomatic relations with the Axis powers (which includes Italy). Soon afterwards, both nations re-established diplomatic relations.

Relations between both nations have remained close. In 2012, Colombia (and Peru) signed a free trade agreement with the European Union (which includes Italy). There have also been several high-level visits and reunions between leaders of both nations. In October 2015, Prime Minister Matteo Renzi became the first Italian head-of-state to visit Colombia. In December 2016, Colombian President Juan Manuel Santos paid a visit to Italy. During his visit, the Italian government expressed its support for the Colombian peace process between the Colombian government and the FARC.

== Bilateral agreements ==
Both nations have signed several agreements such as an Agreement for the exchange of Diplomatic Grants (1933); Agreement for the abolition of visas in diplomatic and service passports (1962); Agreement on Cultural Cooperation (1963); Agreement for Technical and Scientific Cooperation (1971); Agreement to Avoid Double Taxation of Income (1979); Agreement on Economic, Industrial and Technical Cooperation (1987); Agreement of Cooperation in Support of the Alternative Peace and Development Process (2001) and an Agreement on Defense Cooperation (2010).

== Resident diplomatic missions ==
- Colombia has an embassy in Rome and a consulate-general in Milan.
- Italy has an embassy in Bogotá.
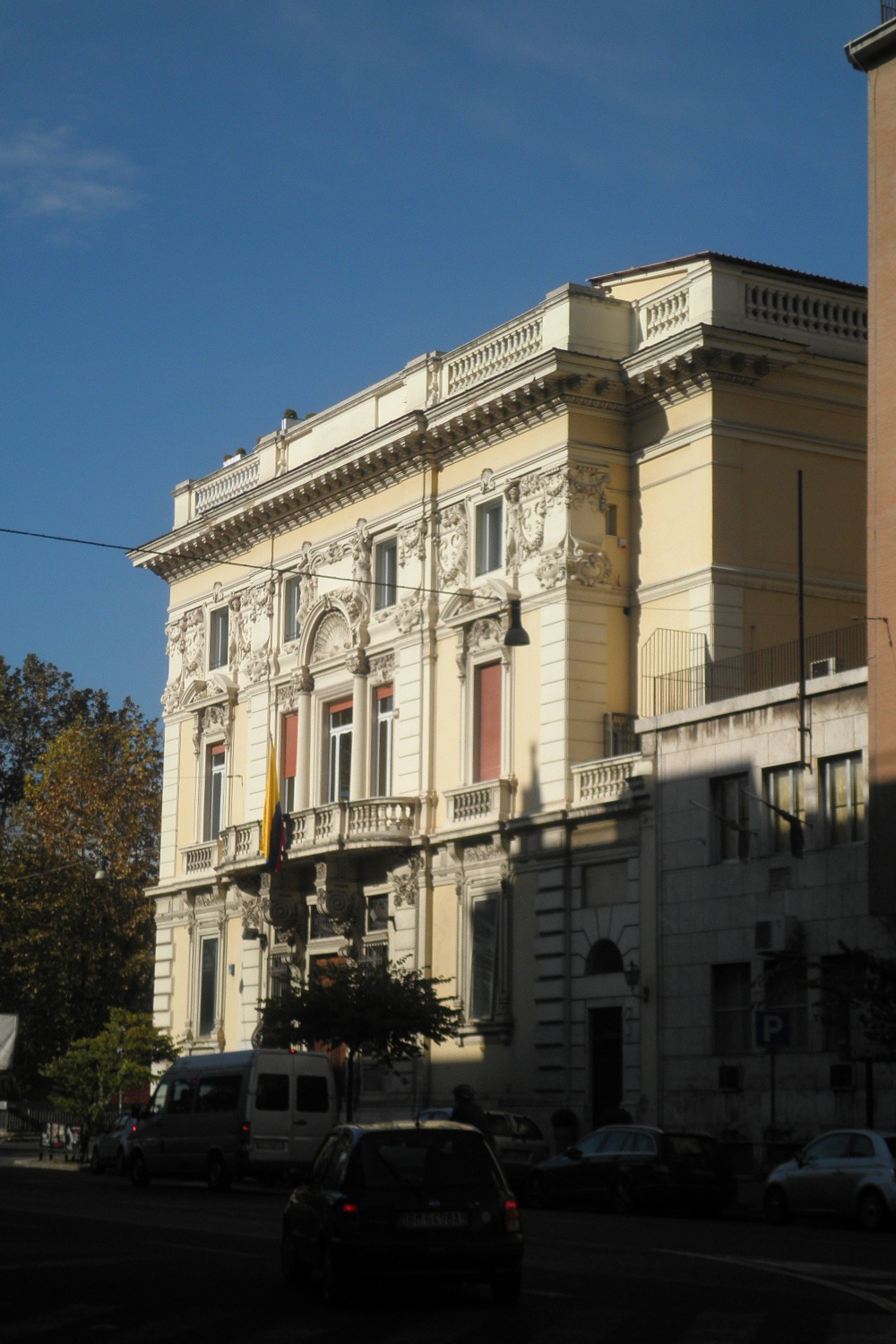
Residence of the Embassy of Colombia in Rome

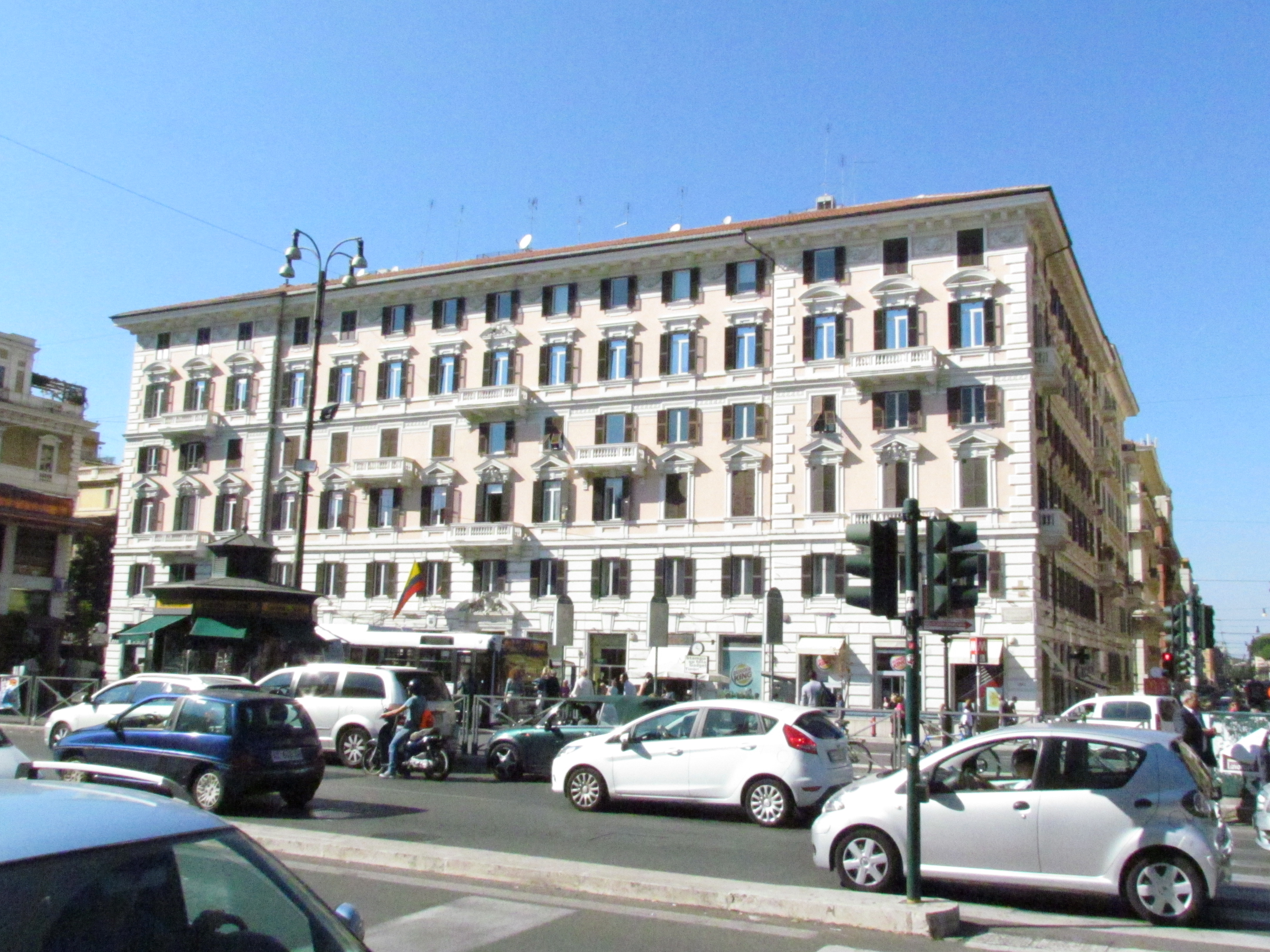
Consulate-General of Colombia in Rome

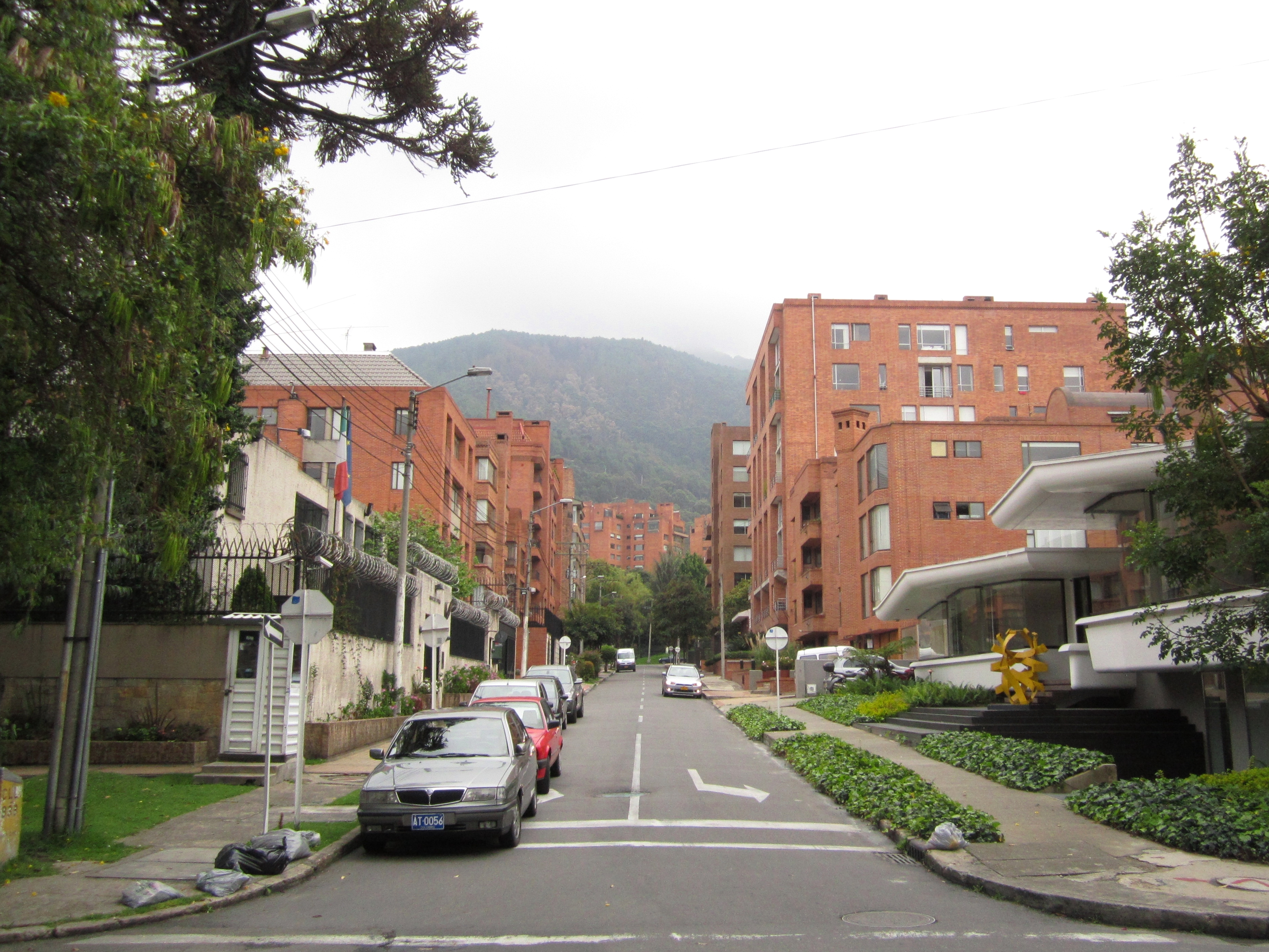
Embassy of Italy in Bogotá

== See also ==
- Italian Colombian
