= Latent Anxiety =

American solo music project

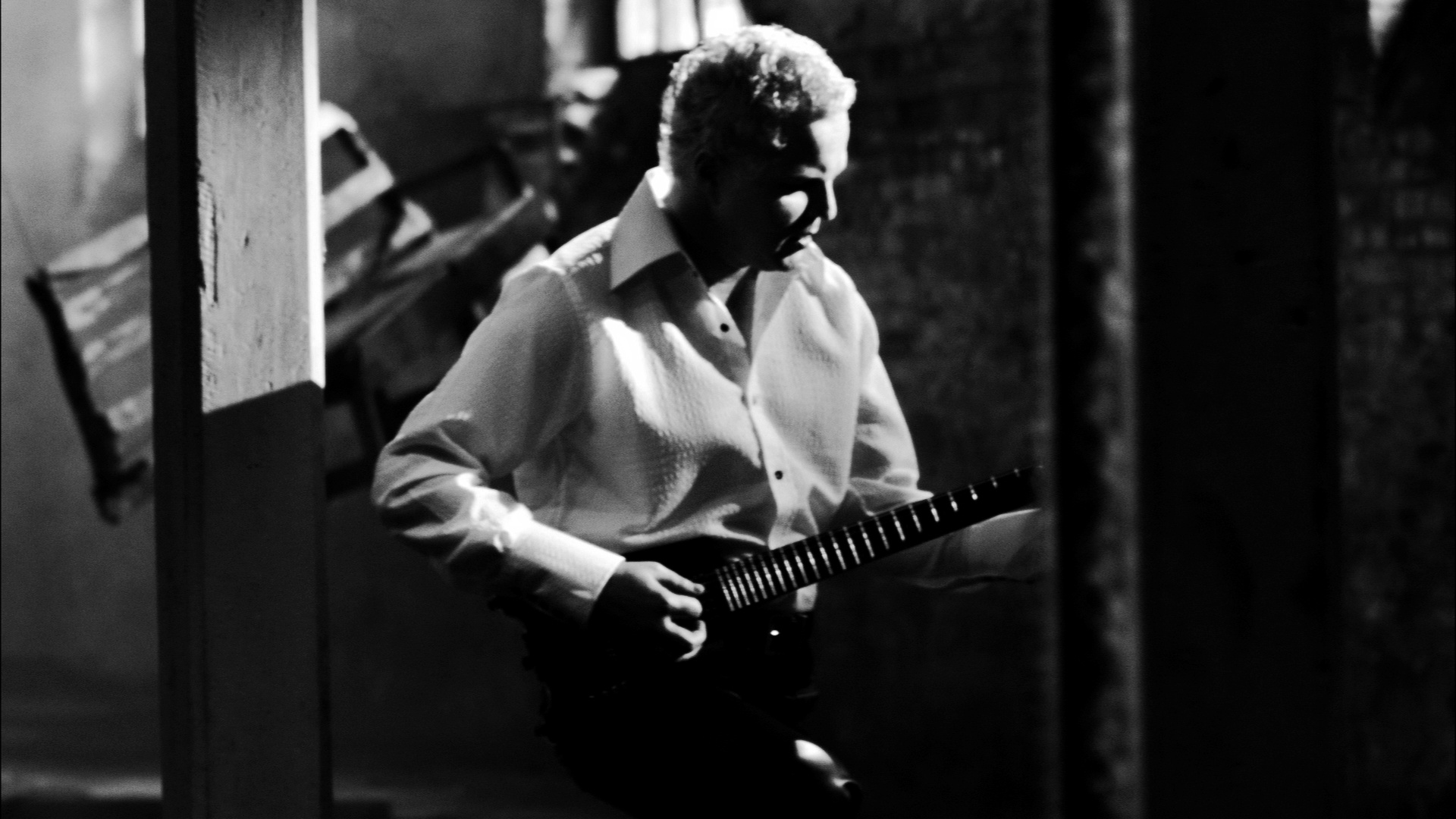
- Still from music video "Love Delirium"

Background information
- Origin: Los Angeles, California, United States
- Genres: Alternative rock Alternative metal Electronic music Industrial rock Industrial metal
- Instrument(s): Vocals, guitar, bass
- Years active: 2001–present
- Labels: Delvian Records (2005-2011)
- Members: Ilja Rosendahl
- Website: www.latentanxiety.com

Latent Anxiety is an American electronic alternative rock solo music project with crossover abilities from Los Angeles, California, United States founded in 2001 by the music producer, songwriter and musician Ilja Rosendahl (vocals, guitars, bass) who is also known as a film producer, director, screenwriter, actor and voiceover artist.

== History ==
=== Naming ===
As to the music project's name Ilja states: "There are two reasons why I chose Latent Anxiety as the name for my music project: Firstly, the initials correspond to the city of Los Angeles where the project was founded in 2001. And secondly, most of my lyrics deal with problems in modern society, such as the growing worry about the future, which is also expressed in the naming of the Latent Anxiety albums."

=== Style and influences ===
In a 2009 interview the Grave Concerns Ezine says: "Ilja Rosendahl creates his own unique style of industrial and gothic music. He reaches further and deeper electronically with his haunting vocals and artistic melodies. His videos are rich with imagination and full of deeper meanings."

Ilja describes the musical style of Latent Anxiety as: "...a crossover of dark wave, industrial and gothic themes with infusions of rock, pop and dance, which has been classified as Electronic Alternative Rock (EAR), an intention to define own boundaries and to reach out for a broader range of listeners. Latent Anxiety's musical style has been and is still being developed and I think that with every new album I'm getting closer to the essence of what I would like to present...Some of my music was inspired by movies or books. With Galley I tried to translate the visual impression of the movie 300 into music, Psycho Discrace was triggered by the movie Silence of the Lambs and Red Death is derived from a short story by Edgar Allan Poe...They (the songs) deal with life experiences and impressions in combination with fantasy, imagination or historical events." "People say that Latent Anxiety has an innovative and sometimes experimental approach. I think it’s a fusion of different styles, hence Electronic Alternative Rock (EAR)...The concept of Latent Anxiety is to combine hard drums with edgy guitars, melodic synths and dark vocals."

Latent Anxiety songs were compared to other musical groups by the Music Street magazine stating "This has that Kraftwerk meets Rammstein approach." and "This is a hard-edged jam that's really almost like a techno version of Judas Priest."

The Sonic Seducer Magazine sees a blend of influences from Europop to Dark Wave and Industrial Music.

AllMusic draws similarities to Roxy Music, Rob Zombie, David Bowie, Thomas Dolby, Ministry, Einstuerzende Neubauten and Nine Inch Nails.

=== Other collaborations ===
Rosendahl also collaborated with vocals and guitars on the Mortal Loom album This Vastness.

== Discography ==
=== Studio albums ===
Year	Album	By	Notes
2016	Salvation	Latent Anxiety	
2012	Liberation	Latent Anxiety	
2010	Suffocation	Latent Anxiety	
2010	This Vastness	Mortal Loom	Vocals, guitars
2008	Detonation	Latent Anxiety	
2007	Reaction	Latent Anxiety	
2007	Sensation	Latent Anxiety	
2005	Perception	Latent Anxiety	

== Awards and nominations ==
Year	Award	For	Result
2011	Hollywood Music Awards	Message From Hell (Best Music Video)	Won
2010	Hollywood Music Awards	Galley (Best Music Video)	Nominated
2009	Equinox I Music Video and Audio Contest	Love Delirium (Best Song)	Won
2005-2009	Song Of The Year Song & Lyric Writing Competition (several awards)	Latent Anxiety	Won
