= La Teacher de Inglés =

- Genre: Telenovela / Comedy
- Created by: Dago García
- Written by: Ana Fernanda Martínez; Andrea López; Carlos Fernández; Karen Rodríguez
- Directed by: Andrés Marroquín
- Starring: Carolina Gómez; Víctor Mallarino; Juan Alfonso Baptista; Isabel Cristina Estrada
- Theme music composer: Antonio Fuentes
- Opening theme: Very very well (Jox)
- Country of origin: Colombia
- Original language: Spanish
- No. of episodes: 106

Production
- Executive producer: Juan Andrés Flores
- Producer: Asier Aguilar
- Production location: Bogotá
- Cinematography: Rafael Puentes, Carlos Gómez
- Editor: Franko
- Camera setup: Multicamera
- Running time: 40 minutes

Original release
- Network: Caracol TV
- Release: January 11 – May 27, 2011

La teacher de inglés is a Colombian telenovela which was produced in 2011 for Caracol Television. It was at first broadcast at 8 pm, was off air for a week when La Reina del Sur was shown, returned May 23–27 until its final episode, and then was replaced by La Bruja. It starred Carolina Gómez and Victor Mallarino, alongside Juan Alfonso Baptista, Isabel Cristina Estrada, Lully Bussa and Samara de Córdova.

== Plot ==
Jesús Kike Peinado (Víctor Mallarino) is the owner of a lingerie manufacturing company, which he founded with his ex wife Mercedes (Lully Bossa), who left him after getting involved with a rich American citizen. Kike starts doing business with American clients, but since he does not speak English, he asks his cousin Luis Fernando (Juan Alfonso Baptista) for help. Luis Fernando, who is involved with drug dealers, is joined by his assistant and lover Milena (Isabel Estrada), both wishing to take advantage of Kike's company. Despite his cousin's help, Kike decides to learn English on his own and meets Pili (Carolina Gómez), a middle-class young woman and a professional English teacher unable to travel to the US after having her visa denied. Kike slowly falls in love with Pili and hires her in order to give private English classes for him and his employees.

== Cast ==
- Victor Mallarino as Jesús Antonio "Kike" Peinado
- Carolina Gómez as Pilar "Pili" Ortega
- Carolina López as Catalina "Cata" Ortega
- Juan Alfonso Baptista as Luis Fernando Caicedo
- Isabel Cristina Estrada as Milena Ramírez
- Dora Cadavid as Rita
- Lully Bossa as Mercedes
- Kenny Delgado as José Acosta
- Samara de Córdova as Eloísa
- Ilja Rosendahl as Immigration Officer
- Jenny Marie Marrero as American confused hotel receptionist
