= Bermúdez (TV series) =

- Title card
- Genre: Telenovela / Comedy
- Written by: Dago García
- Directed by: Andrés Marroquín
- Starring: Víctor Hugo Cabrera; Valentina Rendón; Diego Bertie; Andrea Nocetti
- Theme music composer: J. Pulido
- Opening theme: Tengo (Fabo Romero and Ana Franco)
- Composers: Fabo Romero, J. Pulido
- Country of origin: Colombia
- Original language: Spanish
- No. of episodes: 128 / 79 internacional

Production
- Executive producer: Adriana Mesa
- Producers: Dago García, Asier Aguilar
- Production location: Bogotá
- Cinematography: Rafael Puentes, Fernando Traslaviña
- Editors: Claudia Acevedo, Luis Fernando Martínez
- Camera setup: Multicamera
- Running time: 20 minutes

Original release
- Network: Caracol TV
- Release: February 2 – August 21, 2009

Bermúdez is a 2009 Colombian telenovela produced and broadcast by Caracol TV. It was initially released as Todas odian a Bermúdez ("All women hate Bermúdez").

== Plot ==
The telenovela tells the story of Arturo Bermúdez (Víctor Hugo Cabrera), a sports journalist who works for Hechos, a Bogotá-based weekly current issues news magazine. Bermúdez, who excels as a journalist, nevertheless is regarded as an annoying person, who tends to make disrespectful remarks and jokes, especially toward women. The former editor-in-chief of the magazine quit because of Bermúdez's behaviour.

Hechos's owner, Gonzalo Lleras (Diego Bertie), who returns to Colombia in order to run his businesses, appoints Silvia Vargas (Valentina Rendón) —at the moment editor-in-chief of an evening newspaper— as the new publisher of the magazine. Both Lleras and Vargas are college classmates of Bermúdez, who jokingly refers to Silvia as cuatrolámparas ("four-lamps", because Silvia used to wear glasses during her college years).

Bermúdez, who thought he would become the new editor-in-chief of the magazine as he was friends with then publisher Aníbal Fernández (Alberto León Jaramillo), is transferred by Silvia from the sports section to the "home and women's issues" section instead, as a punishment for an article by Bermúdez published on the magazine during Aníbal's tenure, criticizing the role of women in the Police, responsible for security at football stadia during matches (incidentally, Silvia's older sister, Lina, a police official, was harshly criticized by Arturo in the article), which prompted a backlash among readers and advertisers. Silvia makes Bermúdez rectify the article. Therefore, he is decided to not allow Silvia to "humiliate" him, trying to make Silvia feel bad or angry, with little success. Instead, Vargas ends up helping Bermúdez when he needs it.

Unknowingly, Silvia and Arturo have a friendship via internet. On night hours, they chat using the nicks Solitaria and Solitario respectively (both meaning "lonely"). Their anonymity allows them to pour out and support honestly each other, unlike real life.

Silvia has a crush on Gonzalo, whom he calls in secret the jefe papito, because of his looks and apparent gentlemanliness. On the other hand, since college Bermúdez has had a crush on Lucía Congote (Andrea Nocetti), who works at a television network owned by her family, and Gonzalo's ex-girlfriend. Lucía uses Bermúdez in order to upset Silvia, whom she hates (referring to her disrespectfully as Gatúbela, Batichica or Mujer maravilla), blaming her for "stealing" Gonzalo's love.

== Cast ==
Apart from the four main characters, there have been some inconsistencies regarding the other characters' last names, between the initial press releases and related promotional material issued by Caracol TV to the media and the actual broadcast of the telenovela. In one episode, outgoing Hechos publisher Aníbal introduces most of the staff to his successor, Silvia. The most notorious case is Luz Adriana ("Archila" as for the press releases, "Giraldo" as for episode 3, "Jiménez" as mentioned by Gerardo Bermúdez in another episode). .

- Víctor Hugo Cabrera as Arturo Bermúdez
- Valentina Rendón as Silvia Vargas
- Diego Bertie as Gonzalo Lleras
- Andrea Nocetti as Lucía Congote
- Isabel Cristina Estrada as Paola Ramírez / Paola Rincón (Silvia's best friend, journalist)
- Cecilia Navia as Luz Adriana Archila / Luz Adriana Giraldo / Luz Adriana Jiménez (journalist, appointed editor-in-chief by Silvia)
- Carlos Barbosa as Gerardo Bermúdez (Arturo's father)
- Consuelo Moure as Lola Ortiz de Vargas / Lola Angarita de Vargas (Silvia's mother)
- Claudia Liliana González as Captain Lina Vargas (Silvia's older sister, police official; referred to as Carmenza in promotional material, not in actual broadcast)
- Andrés Felipe Martínez as Rodrigo Mejía (Arturo's best friend, sales chief)
- María Angélica Mallarino as Olga Guerrero (journalist, international editor, former teacher of Silvia)
- Ana María Arango as Marinita González
- Carmenza Cossio as Albita (Silvia's secretary)
- Claudio Cataño as Diego Medina (Lucía's best friend, photojournalist)
- María Isabel Henao as Ana Fernanda Ramírez (journalist, national and economy editor)
- Manolo Orjuela as Manuel Aguilar (journalist, art-and-design editor)
- Natalia Reyes as Marcela Delgado (from episode 18)
- Néstor Alfonso Rojas as Yiyo (moneylender, Gerardo Bermúdez gets intro trouble with him)
- Gloria Echeverry as Stella (Gonzalo Lleras's secretary)
- Kepa Amuchastegui as Lorenzo Castillo (university law professor, love interest of Lola)
- María Cecilia Botero as Cecilia Arbeláez de Lleras (Gonzalo's mother, from episode 81)
- Taliana Vargas as Robin Arzuaga (executive from a Spaniard publishing company)
- María Claudia Torres as Astrid (until episode 15)
- Alberto León Jaramillo as Aníbal Fernández (until episode 4)
- Marion Zapata as an unnamed personal trainer (episodes 75 to 78)
- Mauricio Sarmiento as Danilo Tocarruncho (episodes 77 and 78)
- Andrés Martínez as Manuel Albornoz, aka Manueca (boss of a thief gang, helps Silvia to get a gift for Arturo, involved with a politician, from episode 81)

== Episodes ==
Only the first 2 episodes were around 1 hour long. From episode 3 onwards, episodes last around half hour. It must be noticed that, since the telenovela is being broadcast in Colombia with half hour or even shorter episodes, the numbering has no relation with the 80 hours produced.

No.	Episode title	Original air date
1	Bermúdez y Silvia, unidos por Gonzalo Lleras	2009-02-02
2	Arturo Bermúdez empezó a sufrir	2009-02-03
3	Silvia acabó con los sueños de Arturo	2009-02-04
4	Arturo, el experto en generar polémica	2009-02-05
5	El futuro de Bermúdez, en las manos de Silvia	2009-02-06
6	Bermúdez no tiene salida	2009-02-09
7	Bermúdez mostró su lado bueno	2009-02-10
8	Silvia le cubrió la espalda a Bermúdez	2009-02-11
9	Bermúdez intenta conquistar a Silvia con flores	2009-02-12
10	Silvia le dio una segunda opportunidad an Arturo	2009-02-13
11	Bermúdez se quedó en la calle	2009-02-16
12	El 'jefe papito' visita inesperadamente a Silvia	2009-02-17
13	Gerardo Bermúdez está en peligro	2009-02-18
14	Gerardo Bermúdez recuperó la libertad	2009-02-19
15	Astrid le devolvió el dinero a Bermúdez	2009-02-20
16	Bermúdez vuelve an atacar	2009-02-23
17	Silvia invita a cenar a la familia Bermúdez	2009-02-25
18	'Yiyo' le pide un último favor a Bermúdez	2009-02-26
19	Bermúdez y Lucía, unidos por el trabajo	2009-02-27
20	Lucía Congote no soporta a Bermúdez	2009-03-02
21	Gonzalo y Silvia tienen un acercamiento	2009-03-03
22	Paola cree que está embarazada	2009-03-04
23	Paola Rincón descarta su embarazo	2009-03-06
24	Bermúdez respira por la herida	2009-03-09
25	Lucía intenta suicidarse, pero ni para eso es buena	2009-03-10
26	Bermúdez es condecorado como un héroe	2009-03-11
27	Doña Lola y Bermúdez, dos enemigos en la misma mesa	2009-03-12
28	¡Buen trabajo, Bermúdez!	2009-03-13
29	Arturo pide aumento de sueldo	2009-03-16
30	Bermúdez sale a buscar trabajo	2009-03-17
31	Lucía acabó con la paz de Bermúdez	2009-03-18
32	Bermúdez sufre un grave accidente	2009-03-19
33	Bermudez acorralado	2009-03-20
34	La tentación de Silvia se llama Gonzalo Lleras	2009-03-26
35	A Bermúdez le floreció el talento	2009-03-27
36	Lucía, la nueva aliada de Bermúdez	2009-03-30
37	Comienza la operación conquista de Arturo	2009-03-31
38	Lola, de malas en el amor y de malas en el juego	2009-04-01
39	Arturo no accepta la derrota profesional	2009-04-02
40	Lola vive un romance a los 50 años	2009-04-03
41	Bermúdez, un conquistador innato	2009-04-06
42	Bermúdez, cada vez más lejos de la verdad	2009-04-07
43	Silvia y Gonzalo se acercan cada vez más	2009-04-08
44	Un admirador está por ser descubierto	2009-04-13
45	Ana Fernanda le arruina la vida a Luz Adriana	2009-04-14
46	Gonzalo siente celos de Bermúdez	2009-04-15
47	Lola quiere que capturen a Gerardo Bermúdez	2009-04-16
48	Luz Adriana se cansa de las burlas de Ana Fernanda	2009-04-17
49	Todos creen que Bermúdez es gay	2009-04-20
50	Los dos amigos caen en un chisme de pasillo	2009-04-21
51	Bermúdez le arruinó el primer trabajo periodístico a Marcela	2009-04-22
52	Lucía dejó plantado a Bermúdez	2009-04-23
53	Los Bermúdez no se dan por vencidos	2009-04-24
54	Bermúdez pretende arruinar a Silvia	2009-04-27
55	Silvia le pone freno a Bermúdez	2009-04-28
56	Silvia no comprende el juego de Gonzalo	2009-04-29
57	Lola y Gerado, camino a la universidad	2009-04-30
58	Todos se preparan para una noche de sorpresas	2009-05-06
59	El malévolo plan de Lucía está en marcha	2009-05-07
60	No contaban con su nobleza	2009-05-08
61	Los planes de Lucía Congote fracasan	2009-05-11
62	Más parecidos de lo que creen	2009-05-12
63	El amor duele... y mucho	2009-05-13
64	El destino los sigue uniendo	2009-05-14
65	El que persevera, ¿alcanza?	2009-05-15
66	Vaya sorpresa que se lleva la jefa	2009-05-18
67	Gonzalo Lleras vs. 'La Furia' Bermúdez	2009-05-19
68	Del ring a la estación de policía	2009-05-20
69	Lo cortés no quita lo valiente	2009-05-21
70	Echando a perder se aprende	2009-05-22
71	Don Gerardo se hace sentir	2009-05-26
72	Este fotógrafo tenía su rollo muy bien guardado	2009-05-27
73	Los chismes delatan a Paola	2009-05-28
74	Crea fama y échate a dormir	2009-05-29
75	Los despechados de la revista	2009-06-01
76	Dos mujeres peleándose por Arturo	2009-06-02
77	¡Qué cita tan larga!	2009-06-03
78	Silvia corre en ayuda de su jefe	2009-06-04
79	¡Misión cumplida!	2009-06-05
80	Estos solitarios quieren conocerse	2009-06-09
81	A Gonzalo le exigen matrimonio e hijos	2009-06-10
82	Gerardo insiste en conquistar a Lola	2009-06-11
83	El regalo ideal	2009-06-12
84	Caras vemos, corazones no sabemos	2009-06-16
85	Primero está la salud mental	2009-06-17
86	Una tarde de esparcimiento en la revista	2009-06-18
87	En la revista lo cortés no quita lo valiente	2009-06-19
88	Los Bermúdez son todos unos conquistadores	2009-06-23
89	¿Nunca es tarde? Parece que sí	2009-06-24
90	El amor todo lo puede	2009-06-25
91	Robin Arzuaga, hermosa e inteligente	2009-06-26
92	Encuentran a Gonzalo muy acaramelado con Robin	2009-06-30
93	Silvia cela a Gonzalo	2009-07-01
94	Lucía termina su amistad con Diego	2009-07-03
95	¿Arturo y Silvia compartirán otra noche juntos?	2009-07-06
96	Una noche en la que la soledad es la protagonista	2009-07-07
97	Amor cibernético	2009-07-08
98	Bermúdez saca de sus casillas a Paola	2009-07-09
99	La vida de Silvia es revisada con lupa	2009-07-10
100	Cecilia da su concepto sobre Silvia	2009-07-13
101	Marcela reta an Ana Fernanda en un juego de billar	2009-07-14
102	Le sale muy mal la broma a Gerardo	2009-07-15
104	Una visita sorpresiva de Robin	2009-07-16
105	¿A quién le caerá la flecha de Cupido?	2009-07-17
106	Rodrigo, entre la espada y la pared	2009-07-21
107	A Rodrigo no le basta con embriagarse para olvidar las penas de amor	2009-07-22
108	Gonzalo Lleras está entre la espada y la pared	2009-07-23
109	Silvia, como siempre, tan servicial	2009-07-24
110	Los buenos consejos nunca sobran	2009-07-27
111	Arturo se queda con los crespos hechos	2009-07-28
112	Gonzalo saca su mejor carta	2009-07-29
113	Una cita que trae sorpresas	2009-07-30
114	El destino se encarga de unirlos	2009-07-31
115	Don Gerardo tiene razones de peso	2009-08-03
116	Paola le da su merecido an Arturo	2009-08-04
117	Un nuevo problema de celos en la revista	2009-08-05
118	Se destapa una olla podrida	2009-08-06
119	Lucía accepta salir con Arturo	2009-08-10
120	Fernanda confiesa que tiene problemas con el juego	2009-08-11
121	Ahora sí se enloqueció Bermúdez	2009-08-12
122	Elemental, mi querido Bermúdez	2009-08-13
123	Arturo cumple su sueño	2009-08-14
124	[Special 100 minutes episode]	2009-08-17
125	A lo hecho, pecho	2009-08-18
126	Rodrigo le propone matrimonio a Paola	2009-08-19
127	Por fin se besan Arturo y Silvia	2009-08-20
128	¿Serán felices? (final episode)	2009-08-21

== Reception ==
Though its first episode was the most watched programme in the Colombian primetime on 2 February 2009, ratings declined because Todas odian a Bermúdez was competing against El último matrimonio feliz, rival network RCN TV strongest telenovela at the time. Caracol TV removed the "todas odian a" from the title and Bermúdez was moved to a time slot later in the night, with shorter episodes. Ratings slowly improved, but RCN TV's own ratings crisis before and after El último matrimonio feliz ended 22 April 2009 and Caracol TV's primetime overall performance helped Bermúdez to stay on the air (whereas rival RCN TV pulled or cut most of its shows premiered in the first quarter of 2009).

In April 2009, El Tiempo claimed Bermúdez had been cut from 120 to 80 one-hour episodes and that tapings would end by mid-April. On the L.A. Screenings 2009, held late May in Los Angeles, Bermúdez was introduced as an 80 episode serial.

Diego Bertie told a Peruvian newspaper that Bermúdez was cut from 120 to 100 episodes, stating that "competition is very hard [in Colombia]." Ana María Arango told El Tiempo she was "sad" it was cut because the character she was playing did not become a journalist "as the scripts stated". As of 14 May 2009, Bermúdez ratings were higher that any programme broadcast by RCN TV in primetime.

=== The end ===
On early August 2009, Caracol TV advertised the last episodes of Bermúdez, though the plot of the telenovela was not foretelling its end, because its main characters were just starting to get closer. On 17 August (a holiday in Colombia, where telenovelas are not broadcast on holidays), Caracol TV broadcast a little advertised 100 minute special. The next day, its final episode was announced for 21 August. Hundreds of viewers protested on the network's website because of the sudden end of its run, which only solved, in a fast-paced way, the situation of the main characters, leaving the stories of the other characters without conclusion. Apparently, Caracol TV needed to make room for reality show Desafío 2009 and the series Las muñecas de la mafia (at the time known as Las mujeres del cartel). In Colombia the 80 hours filmed (42 minutes plus commercials each) were not completely broadcast.

One day before the final episode was broadcast, Juliana Tabares, journalist for Doble vía (a programme of the Caracol TV defensoría del televidente [viewer ombudswoman's office]), claimed that recordings of Bermúdez had ended on 30 April and that, despite its short run, it had not been cut not having a different ending to "the one already agreed". A week later, Amparo Pérez, the network's viewer ombudswoman, recognized that "the final episodes were cut and [Bermúdez] was given a fast end where there were even edition flaws", adding that the opinions from the viewers were sent to the Caracol TV "production department".

== International broadcasting ==
The telenovela has been broadcast, under the title Todas odian a Bermúdez, on Mexico (52MX), Venezuela (RCTV) and Ecuador (Teleamazonas). Unlike its original run on Caracol TV, the 80 hours produced were broadcast on their entirety in these countries.
