= List of Italian explorers =

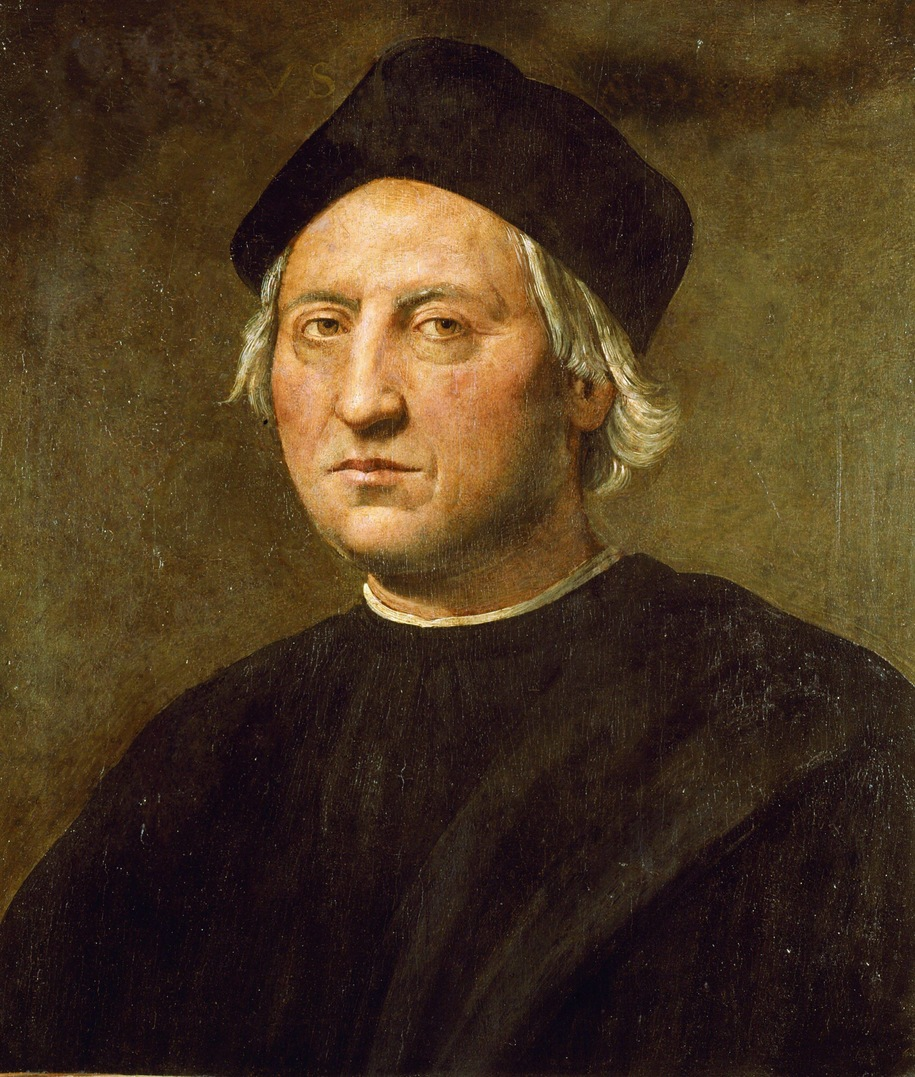
Christopher Columbus (Italian: Cristoforo Colombo), Italian explorer who opened the way for the widespread European exploration and colonization of the Americas

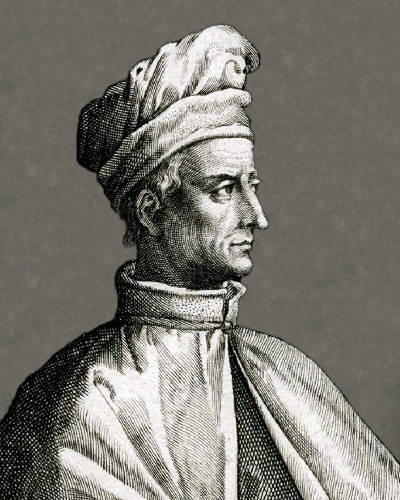
Amerigo Vespucci, Italian explorer from whose name the term "America" is derived

This is list of Italian explorers and navigators (Italian: esploratori) in alphabetical order:

- Giuseppe Acerbi (1773–1846)
- Enrico Alberto d'Albertis (1846–1932)
- Carlo Amoretti (1741–1816)
- Paolo Andreani (1763–1823)
- Orazio Antinori (1811–1882)
- Alberto Maria de Agostini (1883–1960)
- Giosafat Barbaro (1413–1494)
- Giacomo Beltrami (1779–1855)
- Scipione Borghese (1871–1927)
- Vittorio Bottego (1860–1897)
- Giacomo Bove (1852–1887)
- Sebastiano Caboto (1474–1557)
- Umberto Cagni (1863–1932)
- Giovanni Caboto (1450–1500)
- Alvise Cadamosto (1432–1483)
- Gaetano Casati (1838–1902)
- Giuseppe Castiglione (1688–1766)
- Cristoforo Colombo (1451–1506)
- Ambrogio Contarini (1429–1499)
- Niccolò de' Conti (1395–1469)
- Andrea Corsali (1487–?)
- Michele da Cuneo (1448–1503)
- Antonio da Noli (1418–1496)
- Giovanni da Pian del Carpine (1185–1252)
- Ardito Desio (1897–2001)
- Alfonso de Tonti (1659–1727)
- Enrico de Tonti (1649–1704)
- Andrea Doria (1466–1560)
- Eusebio Kino (1645–1711)
- Alessandro Malaspina (1754–1810)
- Lancelotto Malocello (1269–1335)
- Reinhold Messner (born 1944)
- Umberto Nobile (1885–1978)
- Juan Bautista Pastene
- Antonio Pigafetta (1491–1530)
- Emanuele Piloti
- Marco Polo (c. 1253–1324)
- Niccolò and Maffeo Polo (c. 1230 – c. 1294, c. 1230 – c. 1309)
- Michele Pontrandolfo (born 1971)
- Matteo Ricci (1552–1610)
- Prince Luigi Amedeo, Duke of the Abruzzi (1873–1933)
- Pietro Paolo Savorgnan di Brazzà (1852–1905)
- Ermanno Stradelli
- Antoniotto Usodimare
- Giovanni da Verrazzano (1484–1527)
- Amerigo Vespucci (1454–1512)
- Ugolino Vivaldi (fl. 1291)
- Vadino Vivaldi (fl. 1291)
- Fiorenza Cannavale
