= Isabel Cristina Estrada =

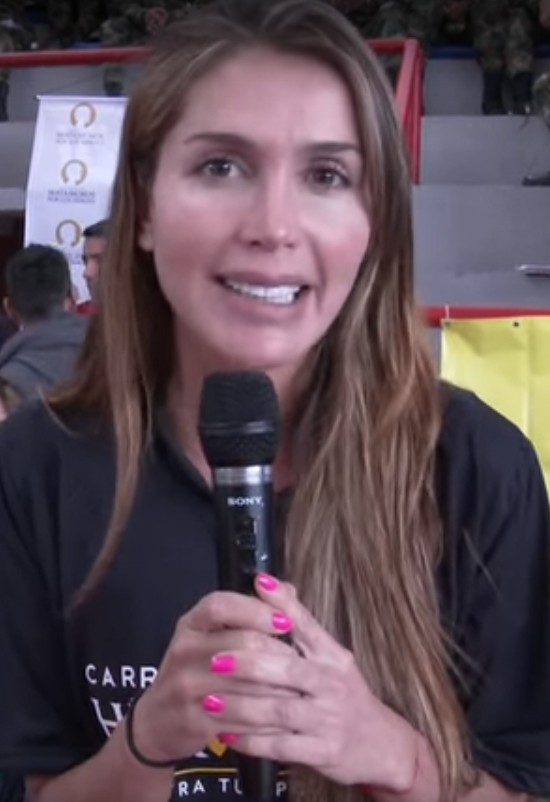
- Born: Isabel Cristina Estrada Cano; 21 January 1980 (age 45); Medellín, Colombia
- Education: EAFIT University
- Occupation(s): Actress, model, presenter
- Spouse: Lucas Arnau (m. 2009; div. 2015)

Isabel Cristina Estrada Cano (born 21 January 1980) is a Colombian actress, model, and presenter.

== Biography ==
Isabel Cristina Estrada was born in Medellín in 1980. In her adolescence she began to work as a model, and played volleyball at a professional level. She studied Systems Engineering at EAFIT University. In 2001, she represented Antioquia Department in the Miss Colombia pageant. A year later, she became the World Banana Queen in a contest held in Ecuador.

She began her career on Colombian television with an appearance in the reality show Nómadas in 2005. Two years later, she made her acting debut in the Caracol Televisión telenovela Newly Rich, Newly Poor, playing the role of Lizeth. For this, she won a TVyNovelas Awards a year later in the category of Best Actress Revelation. In 2009, she appeared in the series Victorinos and Bermúdez.

In the 2010s, she acted in television productions such as La Teacher de Inglés, El Joe, la leyenda, La suegra, ¿Quién mató a Patricia Soler?, and Yo soy Franky. At the end of the decade, she moved away from television to dedicate herself mainly to theater and sports literature. In 2021, she became the presenter of the program Go Ciclismo Para Todos on the Win Sports channel.

== Personal life ==
In 2009, Estrada married the Colombian musician and composer Lucas Arnau. The couple divorced in 2015.

== Filmography ==
=== TV series ===
Year	Title	Role
2007	Newly Rich, Newly Poor	Lizeth Tatiana Rubio / De Pelaez
2007	Decisiones	
2009	Bermúdez	Paola Rincón
2009	Victorinos	Gloria Perez
2010	Decisiones Extremas	
2011	La Teacher de Inglés	Milena Ramírez
2011	El Joe, la leyenda	Aura de Estrada
2011	Mujeres asesinas	Ep. "Las Buitragos, las hermanas"
2013	¿Quién eres tú?	Francisca Roman
2014	La suegra	Margarita Burgos
2015	¿Quién mató a Patricia Soler?	Angélica
2016	La viuda negra	Lawyer
2016	Yo soy Franky	Sara
2019	BJ El Propio	Claudia de Valencia
2019	El Charrito Negro, el sueño de un ídolo	Maria Victoria Aragon

=== Presenter ===
- 2008 – NotiCentro 1 CM& (show business segment)
- 2021 – Go Ciclismo Para Todos

== Awards and nominations ==
Year	Award	Category	Work	Result	Ref.
2008	TVyNovelas Awards	Best Actress Revelation	Newly Rich, Newly Poor	Winner	
2012	TVyNovelas Awards	Best Supporting Actress	El Joe, la leyenda	Nominee	
2012	India Catalina Awards	Best Supporting Actress	El Joe, la leyenda	Nominee	
2015	TVyNovelas Awards	Best Antagonist Actress	La suegra	Nominee	
