= The Inheritance of Flora =

- Theatrical release poster
- Directed by: Augusto Tamayo San Roman
- Screenplay by: Augusto Tamayo San Roman
- Story by: Jimena Ortiz de Zevallos
- Starring: Paloma Yerovi; Diego Bertie; Vanessa Saba; Joaquin de Obergoso; Jimena Lindo
- Cinematography: Juan Durán
- Edited by: Yvonne O'Higgins; Pía Pardón
- Music by: Miguel Figueroa; Víctor Villavicencio
- Production company: Argos Producciones Audiovisuales
- Distributed by: Tondero Distribución
- Release date: March 7, 2024
- Running time: 133 minutes
- Country: Peru
- Language: Spanish

The Inheritance of Flora (Spanish: La herencia de Flora) is a 2024 Peruvian biographical historical drama film directed by Augusto Tamayo San Román who wrote the screenplay from a story by Jimena Ortiz de Zevallos. It stars Paloma Yerovi accompanied by Diego Bertie, who composed an original song, Albertro Ísola, Gonzalo Revoredo, Joaquín de Orbegoso and Jimena Lindo. It premiered on March 7, 2024, in Peruvian theaters.

== Synopsis ==
Flora Tristan travels to Peru from France, escaping from her violent husband, and tries to reclaim a family fortune. When she arrives, her uncle Pio Tristan changes her mother's will and removes her name from the inheritance; however, she witnesses the difference between social classes and the brutality of slavery. When she returns to France she becomes a writer and fights for the rights of women and the working class. Throughout her life, she falls in love with several men and develops a romantic relationship with Polish aristocrat Olympe Chozodok, but decides to end her love life to focus on her work.

== Cast ==
According to the official website, the principal cast are the following:

- Paloma Yerovi as Flora Tristan
- Diego Bertie as Capitan Chabrie
- Silvana Cañote as Aline
- Joaquin de Obergoso as Chazal
- Vanessa Saba as George Sand
- Mónica Sánchez as Mariscala Francisca
- Alberto Ísola as Piio Tristan
- Bruno Odar as Doctor Benitez
- Gonzalo Revoredo as Coronel Escudero

== Production ==
The movie began production at the end of 2021 and the shooting extended to mid-2022. The principal locations are Lima, Burdeos and Arequipa.

== Accolades ==
Year	Award / Festival	Category	Recipient	Result	Ref.
2024	11th Huánuco Film Festival	Best Released Fiction Feature Film	The Inheritance of Flora	Nominated	
2025	2024 APRECI Awards	Best Supporting Actor	Diego Bertie	Pending	
