= La suegra =

- Genre: Telenovela; Comedy
- Starring: Jackeline Arenal; Andrés Parra; Cristhian Tappan; Sebastián Vega; Isabel Cristina Estrada; Paula Barreto; María Cecilia Botero
- Country of origin: Colombia
- Original language: Spanish
- No. of episodes: 120

Production
- Production location: Bogotá
- Running time: 60 minutes
- Production companies: Caracol Televisión; Sony Pictures Television

Original release
- Network: Caracol Televisión
- Release: 4 April – 29 August 2014

La Suegra (transl. The Mother in Law) is a 2014 Colombian telenovela produced and broadcast by Caracol Televisión.

== Plot ==
Victoria Maldonado is a vivacious, ambitious and passionate woman who lives in Bogota, Colombia. Founder of Casa Victoria (a successful clothing business,) Victoria is also a single mother of three. She impulsively decides to leave Colombia to go to Miami to further her modeling career. She leaves the business in the hands of her three children and abruptly ends a loving relationship with her boyfriend Carlos. Once she arrives at Miami, she starts a successful TV show, which makes her a household name in the United States. Ten years go by and the children run the business into the ground due to their negligence, lavish lifestyles and irresponsibility. At the brink of collapse, they reach out to Victoria and ask her to help them by providing the funds to rescue the company. Having had her show sabotaged by her producers, Victoria decides to leave Miami and return to her family and friends in Colombia. However, she puts forth several demands that they must meet before she will help them rescue her business. Noting the fiscal irresponsibility of her children, she demands that they give her complete control of the business as President of Casa Victoria and that they allow her to control all of the finances and business decisions. In order to collect emergency funds, she says they must sell their cars, houses and lavish goods and immediately provide her with those funds. To foster solidarity and unity, she also demands that they all move into her large home. Her eldest son Bernardo and her son in law Rene (both keen on getting on Victoria's good side to ensure their inheritance of her wealth and her business,) compete to win Victoria's favor. Though they dislike each other, Bernardo and Rene agreed that Victoria is the best person to rescue the business; they agreed to put her in charge and earn her favor. Victoria's eldest son Bernardo (the irresponsible ex-president) is married to a spoiled and demanding wife named Margarita who tries to pit him against his mother in order to keep him subjugated. Victoria's son in law Rene (a homely and capable but shifty man) is married to Victoria's beautiful but insecure daughter Marcela. Rene admires the shrewdness, tenacity, assertiveness of his mother in law and is keen on proving himself to her. Feeling neglected and ignored by her mother, Marcela often sides with Margarita, who openly despises Victoria. In desperation to fix their financial plight, everyone agrees to Victoria's terms and they all move in with her.

The show then follows the power struggles between Bernardo/Rene and Victoria/Margarita as well as the turbulence generated from Victoria's desire to "straighten out" the misguided and unstable lifestyles of her children. Being frank, insightful and brusque, Victoria identifies different problems in the lives of her children and tries to help them address those problems. Victoria tries to help her estranged daughter Marcela find her passion and direction in life. Victoria tries to help her eldest son Bernardo overcome his dependence on his meddling and immature (but strong willed and independent) wife Margarita- who tries to be a good wife/mother and both succeeds (e.g. in her love, compassion and support of her son) as well as struggles (e.g. to accept her son's interest in fashion/dress making, to accept her son's and husband's affinity to Victoria, etc.) Sensing the bad intentions of her youngest son's girlfriend Carolina (a seemingly sweet and attractive girl who is actually a cunning, classist and manipulative woman,) Victoria tries to help Juan remember his individuality and escape from the unhealthy relationship that is consuming him and turning him into someone that he is not. In terms of her own personal life, Victoria tries to ignore her romantic interest in Carlos, who is still in love with her and who she still has feelings for. Victoria's magnetic personality attracts genuine friends (such as her endearing and capable secretary Yamile- who happens to be Carlos' daughter) as well as false friends including Beatriz- a likable woman who tries to be a good friend but can be dishonest (she works with Carlos' mother Prudencia to try to sabotage Victoria's budding relationship with Carlos and his daughter.) Beatriz has been dating Carlos for the past 10 years, a fact she actively hides from Victoria along with many other secrets. Victoria herself has her faults as well. She struggles to decide whether she should follow her heart and reconnect with Carlos or use her beauty and charm to marry a wealthy man and solve her family's financial crises.

== Cast ==
- Jackeline Arenal as Victoria Maldonado vda. de Burgos / de Contreras / de Amador
- Danilo Santos as Carlos Enrique Amador Guzmán
- Paula Barreto as Marcela Burgos Maldonado de Higuera
- Andrés Parra as René Higuera del Castillo
- Isabel Cristina Estrada as Margarita Valencia de Burgos
- Cristhian Tappan as Bernardo Burgos Maldonado
- Eileen Roca as Yamile Amador
- Mario Espitia as Juan K Burgos Maldonado
- Alejandra Chamorro as Azucena Contreras
- Sebastián Vega as Luis Guillermo Burgos Valencia
- Laura Perico as Carolina López de Burgos
- Tiberio Cruz as Roberto Contreras
- Ana María Arango as Prudencia Guzmán vda. de Amador
- María Cecilia Botero as Beatriz Eugenia Espitia
- Alberto Saavedra a Emilio de Jesús Contreras Pataquiva
- Adriana Osorio as Myriam
- Fernando Arango as Gerardo
- Fernando Lara as Albeiro
- Juan Pablo Gamboa as Dr. Domínguez
- Samara de Córdova as Magdalena
- Gabriel Vanegas as "El Cura"
- Norma Nivia as Camila
- Belky Arizala as Stephanie

== Awards and nominations ==
Premios Saturn

Year	Category	Nominated work	Result
2014	Best supporting actor	Sebastián Vega	Nominated

Premios TvyNovelas

Year	Category'	'Nominated	Result
2015	Best telenovela		Nominated
2015	Best leading actress of telenovelas	Jackeline Arenal	Nominated
2015	Best leading actor of telenovelas	Cristhian Tappan	Nominated
2015	Best antagonistic telenovela actress	Isabel Cristina Estrada	Nominated
2015	Best antagonistic telenovela actress	María Cecilia Botero	Nominated
2015	Best supporting actress	Eileen Roca	Nominated
2015	Best supporting actor	Sebastián Vega	Nominated

Premios Talento Caracol

Year	Category	Nominated	Result
2015	Best supporting actor	Andrés Parra	Won
2015	Best antagonistic actress	María Cecilia Botero	Nominated
2015	Best antagonistic actress	Laura Perico	Nominated
2015	Best antagonistic actor	Alberto Saavedra	Nominated
2015	Best couple	Victoria (Jackeline Arenal) and Caliche (Danilo Santos)	Nominated
