= ¡Qué difícil es amar! =

- Theatrical release poster
- Directed by: David Ames
- Written by: David Ames
- Produced by: David Ames; Cynthia Villar
- Starring: Diego Bertie; Oscar López Arias; Valentín Prado
- Edited by: Kevin Acosta
- Music by: Toño López
- Production companies: La Musa De Arriba; Green Octopus Design
- Distributed by: New Century Films
- Release date: February 1, 2018
- Running time: 90 minutes
- Country: Peru
- Language: Spanish

¡Qué difícil es amar! (lit. 'How difficult it is to love!') is a 2018 Peruvian romantic comedy film written, directed and co-produced by David Ames in his directorial debut. Starring Milett Figueroa, Diego Bertie, Oscar López Arias and Valentín Prado.

== Synopsis ==
The film narrates the adventures of three friends in love, who have the particularity of living together as roommates, being of different ages; one being in their 20s, one in their 30s and one in their 40s.

== Cast ==
The actors include:

- Diego Bertie
- Milett Figueroa
- Oscar López Arias
- Valentín Prado
- Daniela Sarfati

== Release ==
The film was scheduled to be released on January 11, 2018, in Peruvian theaters, but the release was delayed until February 1 of the same year for marketing reasons.
