= Luz Stella Luengas =

Colombian actress (born 1962)

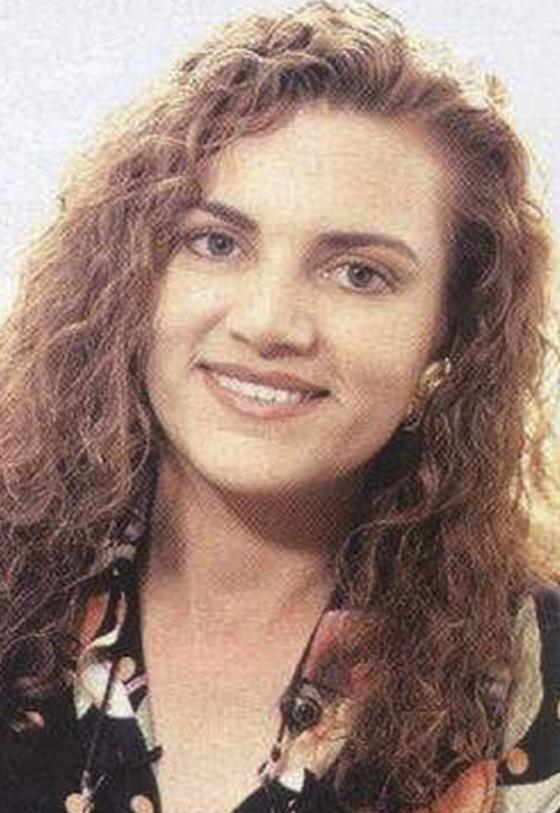
- Born: 13 February 1962 (age 64); Medellín, Colombia
- Occupations: Actress, model

Luz Stella Luengas (born 13 February 1962) is a Colombian actress. She is best known for her performance as Ana María Franco in Padres e Hijos.

== Filmography ==
- La ley del corazón (2016)
- ¿Quién mató a Patricia Soler? (2015)
- El Clon (2010; TV series)
- Gabriela giros del destino (2009)
- La Traición (2008)
- Karmma, el peso de tus actos (2006)
- Visitas (2006)
- Te Voy A Enseñar A Querer (2004)
- Te busco (2002)
- La Venganza (2002)
- Bogotá 2016 (2001) .... Mamá (segment Zapping)
- Luzbel esta de visita (2001)
- Entre amores (2000)
- Kalibre 35 (2000)
- La reina de Queens (2000)
- Yo amo a Paquita Gallego (1998)
- Padres e Hijos (1992–1998; TV series)
