= Miss Colombia 2001 =

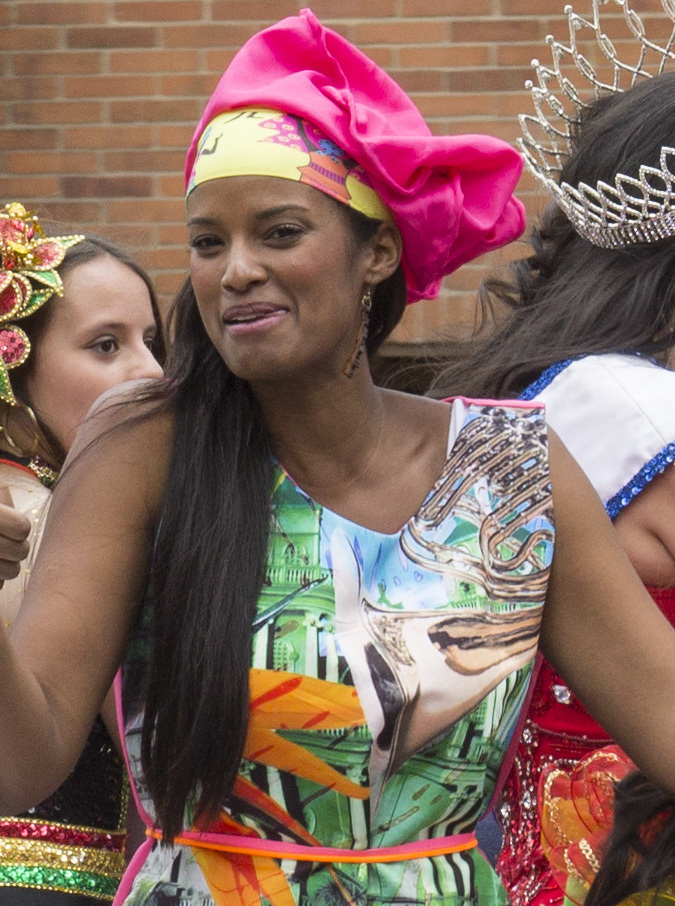
- Date: 12 November 2001
- Presenters: Ruddy Rodriguez; Jorge Alfredo Vargas
- Venue: Centro de Convenciones Julio Cesar Turbay, Cartagena de Indias
- Broadcaster: RCN TV
- Entrants: 21
- Winner: Vanessa Mendoza; Chocó
- Congeniality: Isabel Cristina Estrada; Antioquia
- Best National Costume: Juanita Martínez; Huila
- Photogenic: Juanita Martínez; Huila

Miss Colombia 2001, the 67th Miss Colombia pageant, was held in Cartagena de Indias, Colombia, on 12 November 2001, after three weeks of events. The winner of the pageant was Vanessa Mendoza, Miss Chocó.

The pageant was broadcast live on RCN TV from the Centro de Convenciones Julio Cesar Turbay in Cartagena de Indias, Colombia. At the conclusion of the final night of competition, outgoing titleholder Andrea Nocetti crowned Vanessa Mendoza of Chocó as the new Miss Colombia.

== Results ==
=== Placements ===
Placement	Contestant
Miss Colombia 2001	Chocó – Vanessa Mendoza
1st Runner-Up	Valle – Consuelo Guzmán Parra
2nd Runner-Up	Atlántico – Johanna Cure Lesmus
3rd Runner-Up	Santander – María Claudia Peña
4th Runner-Up	Huila – Juanita Martínez Bahamon

== Delegates ==
The Miss Colombia 2001 delegates are:

- Antioquia - Isabel Cristina Estrada Cano
- Atlántico - Johanna Cure Lemus
- Bogotá D.C. - Diana Maria Quimbay Valencia
- Bolívar - Andrea Margarita Álvarez Vásquez
- Caldas - Cristina Arango Londoño
- Cartagena DT y C - Paola Carolina Turbay Haddad
- Cesar - Lina Margarita Trujillo Baute
- Chocó - Vanessa Alexandra Mendoza Bustos
- Córdoba - Rossana Zuleta Bechara
- Cundinamarca - Andrea Paola Garzón Gutiérrez
- Guajira - María Alejandra Ariza Cuello
- Huila - Juanita Martínez Bahamón
- Meta - Diana Marcela Quintero Morales
- Norte de Santander - Myriam Cecilia Wilches Durán
- Quindío - Johanna Andrea Acosta Martínez
- San Andrés and Providencia - Jackeline Suzette Howard Pardo
- Santander - Maria Claudia Peñuela Cortejo
- Sucre - María Carolina Amador Vergara
- Tolima - Diana Carolina Restrepo Chinchilla
- Valle - Consuelo Guzmán Parra
- Vichada - Linda Carolina Osorio Bustos
