= Arboletes =

- Municipality and town
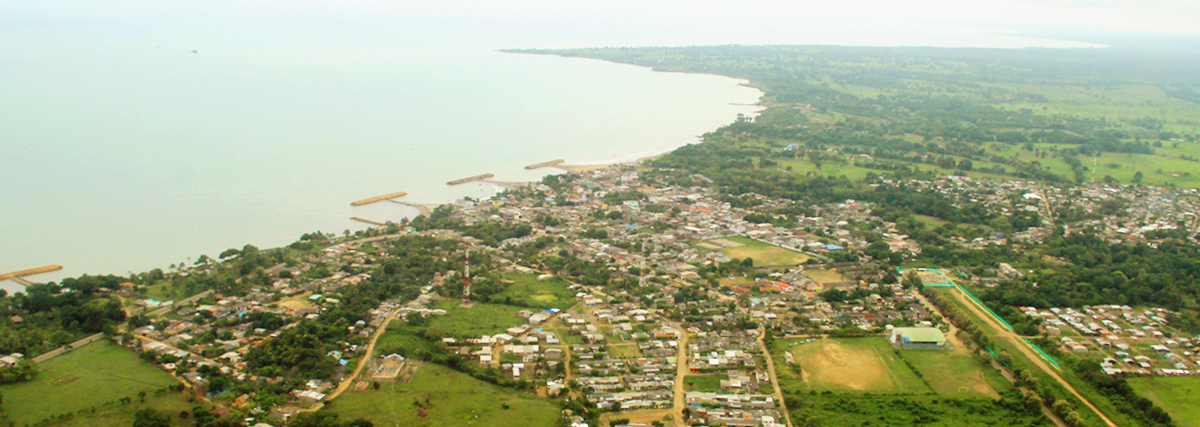

- Flag

- Location of the municipality and town of Arboletes in the Antioquia Department of Colombia

- Location in Colombia
- Coordinates: 8°52′N 76°26′W
- Country: Colombia
- Department: Antioquia
- Subregion: Urabá

Government
  - Alcalde: Gustavo German Guerra Guerra

Area
  - Total: 718 km^{2} (277 sq mi)
- Elevation: 50 m (160 ft)

Population (2020 estimate)
  - Total: 45,710
- Time zone: UTC-5 (Colombia Standard Time)
- Website: arboletes-antioquia.gov.co

Arboletes is a town and municipality in the subregion of Urabá in Antioquia Department, Colombia.

The municipality is bounded by the Caribbean Sea to the north, the department of Córdoba to the north and east, the municipality of San Pedro de Urabá to the south and west, and the municipalities of Turbo and Necoclí. The town is 502 km from the city of Medellín, capital of the department of Antioquia. The municipality covers an area of 710 km².

Arboletes has 8 rural townships (corregimientos): El Carmelo, La Trinidad, Naranjitas, El Guadual, La Candelaria, Buenos Aires, Las Platas and Pajillal.

== History ==
Arboletes is a municipality of the department of Antioquia.

The town of Arboletes was founded in 1920 and the municipality of Arboletes was established in August 1958.

== Mud volcano ==
Arboletes has a mud volcano in the Santa Fe de la Plata corregimiento, which erupted in 2006 and 2010.

== Climate ==
Arboletes has a tropical savanna climate (Aw) with moderate to little rainfall from December to March and heavy rainfall from April to November.

Climate data for Arboletes, elevation 4 m (13 ft), (1981–2010)
Month	Jan	Feb	Mar	Apr	May	Jun	Jul	Aug	Sep	Oct	Nov	Dec	Year
Mean daily maximum °C (°F)	30.5 (86.9)	30.4 (86.7)	30.7 (87.3)	30.8 (87.4)	30.8 (87.4)	31.0 (87.8)	30.9 (87.6)	30.8 (87.4)	30.7 (87.3)	30.8 (87.4)	30.6 (87.1)	30.4 (86.7)	30.7 (87.3)
Daily mean °C (°F)	27.6 (81.7)	27.6 (81.7)	28.0 (82.4)	28.2 (82.8)	28.0 (82.4)	27.8 (82.0)	27.7 (81.9)	27.6 (81.7)	27.3 (81.1)	27.3 (81.1)	27.3 (81.1)	27.4 (81.3)	27.6 (81.7)
Mean daily minimum °C (°F)	23.5 (74.3)	24.0 (75.2)	24.3 (75.7)	24.2 (75.6)	23.5 (74.3)	23.4 (74.1)	23.0 (73.4)	22.9 (73.2)	22.8 (73.0)	22.9 (73.2)	23.1 (73.6)	23.4 (74.1)	23.4 (74.1)
Average precipitation mm (inches)	15.4 (0.61)	16.8 (0.66)	41.6 (1.64)	127.4 (5.02)	251.1 (9.89)	191.7 (7.55)	202.1 (7.96)	226.1 (8.90)	187.8 (7.39)	206.9 (8.15)	183.8 (7.24)	80.0 (3.15)	1,711 (67.4)
Average precipitation days (≥ 1.0 mm)	3	2	4	8	14	12	13	12	11	12	11	6	106
Average relative humidity (%)	81	80	79	82	85	84	84	84	84	83	83	83	83
Mean monthly sunshine hours	220.1	194.8	189.1	150.0	145.7	153.0	161.2	161.2	144.0	148.8	177.0	195.3	2,040.2
Mean daily sunshine hours	7.1	6.9	6.1	5.0	4.7	5.1	5.2	5.2	4.8	4.8	5.9	6.3	5.6
Source: Instituto de Hidrologia Meteorologia y Estudios Ambientales
