= Víctor Hugo Cabrera =

Colombian actor (born 1968)

Víctor Hugo Cabrera is a Colombian actor, born 1968.

Cabrera is son to Ecuadorian artist Víctor Hugo Cabrera y Cáceres, member of musical theatre group Los Chaparrines, and radio actress Concha Potier.

Cabrera debuted as a radio and theatre actor as well in the 1970s. His film debut was in the 1976 movie La abuela, while his television debut was in the 1979 series Las aventuras de Tom Sawyer. He went on play mostly supporting roles in series, anthologies and telenovelas, one of the most famous being Peter Alexander Tuta in the 1988-1992 comedy Romeo y Buseta.

His first lead role was as Rafael Méndez in the 2006 RCN TV telenovela Hasta que la plata nos separe, opposite Marcela Carvajal. As of 2009, he stars in the Caracol TV telenovela Bermúdez, opposite Valentina Rendón.
