= ¿Quién mató a Patricia Soler? =

- Genre: Telenovela
- Developed by: RTI Producciones
- Directed by: Felipe Aguilar; Rodolfo Hoyos
- Starring: Itatí Cantoral; Miguel de Miguel; Géraldine Zivic
- Opening theme: "Hoy seré feliz" by Ilona "No querías lastimarme" by Gloria Trevi (USA Version)
- Country of origin: Colombia
- Original language: Spanish
- No. of seasons: 1
- No. of episodes: 101 ( 120 International version)

Production
- Executive producer: Hugo León Ferrer
- Production locations: Bogotá, Colombia; New York City, United States
- Cinematography: Carlos Arango de Montis; Edwin Castellanos
- Running time: 42-45 minutes

Original release
- Network: RCN Televisión
- Release: February 9 – July 30, 2015

¿Quién mató a Patricia Soler? is a 2015 Spanish-language telenovela produced by RTI Producciones for Colombia-based television network RCN Televisión. The program is fifth in a series of remakes of the 1981 Chilean telenovela La madrastra.

== Plot ==
17 years ago a group of friends, partners of a jeweler's emporium, traveled on business to New York. One night, Sara Fernández, wife of Sebastián Sinisterra, president of the company is surprised with the body of Patricia Soler with the revolver in her hands. She is brought to trial, where one of Sebastian's partners, Samuel, who is in love with Sara, testifies against her for not responding to his feelings, causing her to be sentenced to life imprisonment.

In prison, Sara had a hobby of making pieces of silver jewelry, art that passes to her cellmate. Because of her sentence, Sara loses custody of her two young children, Lucia and Camilo, and suffers from the injustice committed by Sebastian. Now the only thoughts that motivate Sara's life are: to obtain her freedom, recover her children and find out Patricia's real killer to finally do justice.

Meanwhile, Sebastian and the rest of the partners continue with their lives. Joaquín and Florencia have managed to have a good status while Ricardo and Daniela, losing their fortune on bad investments, Ricardo tries to marry his niece Silvia to Sebastian in order to recover the lost wealth. Samuel never regrets having lied against Sara, while Alba and Carmen, Sebastian's aunts, maintain their stock in the company and their leadership in the house. Also, his children Camilo and Lucia, along with Diego (son of Patricia) and Rodrigo (Younger son of Carmen), have joined the management of the jeweler's emporium.

After a pardon is obtained by Sara's lawyer, Sara finally obtains her freedom and returns to the country seeking to recover her dignity and do justice to Patricia's death. As the story progresses, suspects are discarded and there are only three people left who went on that trip and could be the probable murderers. Finally, Sara discovers who really killed Patricia and in the final confrontation with the killer, she is about to die, but Sebastian saves her by delivering the real murderer to the authorities to pay for all the crimes that were committed.

== Cast ==
- Géraldine Zivic - Patricia Soler
- Itatí Cantoral - Sara Fernández "Isabel"
- Miguel de Miguel - Sebastián Sinisterra
- Juan de Dios Ortíz - Ricardo Sotomayor
- Kristina Lilley - Alba Sinisterra
- Natalia Ramírez - Carmen Sinisterra
- Juan Pablo Franco - Samuel Gutiérrez
- Ricardo Vélez - Joaquín Delgado
- Andrea López - Florencia Ríos
- Paula Barreto - Daniela Contreras
- César Mora - Da Vinci
- Carlos Hurtado - El Pulpo
- Sandra Itzel - Lucía Sinisterra
- Luz Stella Luengas - Ángela
- José Daniel Cristancho - Camilo Sinisterra
- Santiago Gómez - Rodrigo Sinisterra
- Ricardo Mejía - Diego
- Juan Manuel Restrepo - Miguel Tobón
- Isabel Cristina Estrada - Angélica
- Ana Wills - Silvia
- Alejandro López - Fernando Ramírez
- Franártur Duque - Taxista
- Natalia Giraldo - Rebeca
- Margalida Castro - Madre Victoria
- Carlos Felipe Sanchez - Pablo
- Milena Ribero - Valeria
- Aldemar Correa - Carlos
- Samuel Zuluaga - Ramón

|}
