= Miss Colombia 2000 =

- Date: November 12, 2000
- Presenters: Cecilia Bolocco; Jorge Alfredo Vargas
- Venue: Centro de Convenciones Julio Cesar Turbay, Cartagena de Indias, Colombia
- Broadcaster: RCN TV
- Entrants: 22
- Winner: Andrea Nocetti; Cartagena
- Congeniality: Diana Carolina Reginfo; Tolima
- Best National Costume: Alejandra Palacios; Amazonas
- Photogenic: Rocio Stevenson; Bolívar

Miss Colombia 2000, the 66th Miss Colombia pageant, was held in Cartagena de Indias, Colombia, on November 12, 2000, after three weeks of events. The winner of the pageant was Andrea Nocetti, Miss Cartagena.

The pageant was broadcast live on RCN TV from the Centro de Convenciones Julio Cesar Turbay in Cartagena de Indias, Colombia. At the conclusion of the final night of competition, outgoing titleholder Catalina Acosta crowned Andrea Nocetti of Cartagena de Indias as the new Miss Colombia.

== Results ==
=== Placements ===
Placement	Contestant
Señorita Colombia 2000	Cartagena – Andrea Nocetti
1st runner-up	Bolívar – Rocio Stevenson
2nd runner-up	Cauca – Mónica Caicedo Valencia
3rd runner-up	Valle del Cauca – Giselle Garcés Aljure
4th runner-up	Santander – Lusdey Edith Ibarra

=== Special awards ===
Award	Contestant
Miss Photogenic	Bolívar – Rocio Stevenson
Miss Congeniality	Tolima – Diana Carolina Rengifo
Best National Costume	Amazonas – Alajandra Palacios
Queen of the National Police	Norte de Santander – Alexandra Rolón
Best in Punctuality	Huila – María del Pilar Sandoval
Miss Elegance	Atlántico – Natalie Ackermann

== Contestants ==
Twenty-two contestants competed for the title.

Department/City	Contestant	Age (Note: Ages at the time of the pageant)
Amazonas	Claudia Alejandra Palacios López	20
Antioquia	Ana Milena Amórtegui González	21
Atlántico	Natalie Elvira Ackermann Montealegre	20
Bogotá	María Fernanda Navia Cardona	21
Bolívar	Maria Rocío Stevenson Covo	21
Caldas	Andrea Ocampo González	20
Cartagena	Andrea María Nocetti Gómez	22
Cauca	Mónica Caicedo Valencia	20
Cundinamarca	Marcela Ocampo Trujillo	22
La Guajira	Luz Karime Henríquez Gómez	22
Huila	María del Pilar Sandoval Medina	22
Magdalena	Lizeth Alfaro López	23
Meta	Martha Alexandra Gaitán Lozano	23
Nariño	Carolina Rivera Bedoya	22
Norte de Santander	Ana Alexandra Rolón Lara	20
Putumayo	Paola Andrea Muñoz López	18
Risaralda	Natalia Londoño Builes	18
San Andrés and Providencia	Margaret Brown Bryan	23
Santander	Luzdey Edith Ibarra Rangel	23
Sucre	Silvia Paola Flórez Sierra	21
Tolima	Diana Carolina Rengifo Ortiz	19
Valle del Cauca	Giselle Garcés Aljure	21
