= Geovanis Cassiani =

Colombian footballer (born 1970)

Personal information
- Full name: Geovanis Cassiani Gómez
- Date of birth: 10 January 1970 (age 56)
- Place of birth: Turbo, Colombia
- Height: 1.79 m (5 ft 10 in)
- Position: Centre-back

Senior career*
Years	Team	Apps	(Gls)
1988–1992	Atlético Nacional	98	(2)
1993–1995	América de Cali	61	(1)
1997–1998	Deportes Tolima	72	(3)
2000	Envigado	30	(1)
2001	Atlético Nacional	29	(0)
Total		290	(7)

International career
1990–1997	Colombia	7	(0)
- * Club domestic league appearances and goals

Geovanis Cassiani Gómez (Note: In this Spanish name, the first or paternal surname is Cassiani and the second or maternal family name is Gómez.) (born 10 January 1970, in Turbo, Antioquia), known as Geovanis Cassiani, is a Colombia former footballer who played as a centre-back. He played for the Colombia national team at the 1992 Summer Olympics in Barcelona, Spain, wearing the #13 jersey. Cassiani also was a member of the 1990 FIFA World Cup squad. In Argentina, he played 10 matches in Rosario Central, in the 1998–99 season.

He is the younger brother of Francisco Cassiani.
