= Andrea Nocetti =

Actress, beauty pageant titleholder

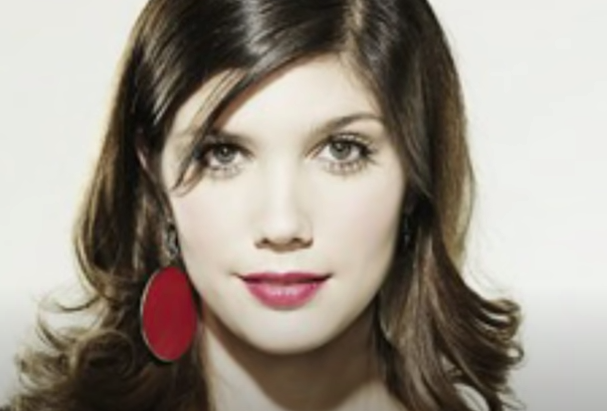
- Born: Andrea María Nocetti Gómez; Cartagena, Bolívar, Colombia
- Occupation: Actress
- Height: 1.78 m (5 ft 10 in)
- Beauty pageant titleholder
- Title: Miss Cartagena 2000; Miss Colombia 2000
- Major competition: Miss Colombia 2000 (Winner)

Andrea María Nocetti Gómez is a Colombian actress and beauty pageant titleholder who won Miss Colombia 2000.

Nocetti became Miss Colombia, representing Cartagena, in November 2000. Her first television appearance was in 2004, appearing in the Caracol TV reality show La Granja Tolima, and on the 2005 telenovela El pasado no perdona. In 2007, she played the evil Fernanda Sanmiguel de Ferreira on the Caracol TV telenovela Nuevo rico, nuevo pobre. In 2009, she appeared in Bermúdez, also as the evil Lucía Congote.

Nocetti starred in the 2008 Colombian film Ni te cases ni te embarques, opposite Víctor Hugo Cabrera.

== Controversy with David Letterman ==
In May 2001, David Letterman joked about the 'special talent' which Noceti, the then-reigning Miss Colombia, possessed - that she was able to "swallow 50 balloons full of heroin" for the (non-existent) talent competition at Miss Universe 2001. The remark not only infuriated Nocetti, but also the people of Colombia.

Nocetti threatened to sue Letterman but later withdrew the threat after Letterman formally apologized to her in the Late Show with David Letterman. Letterman invited her to appear on the show as a gesture of appeasement.

Preceded by Catalina Acosta Cundinamarca	Miss Colombia; 2000	Succeeded by Vanessa Mendoza Chocó
