= Imágenes (band) =

Peruvian rock band

Imagenes
- Origin: Lima, Peru
- Genres: New Wave
- Years active: 1986–1988, 1999
- Past members: Diego Bertie; Aurelio Garcia; Dante Albertini; Hernan Campos; Gastón Acurio

Imágenes was a Peruvian rock band conformed by the later well-known actor Diego Bertie (vocals), Aurelio "Chifa" García Miró (drums), Dante Albertini (bass) and Hernán Campos (guitar).

The musical debut of actor Diego Bertie was in 1986 when he was a student of the Universidad del Pacífico. He joined his classmates Aurelio Garcia Miró, Dante Albertini and Hernan Campos; they initiated the band when they were in high school, and they called it Imágenes. Before Diego sang vocals, the lead singer was the well recognized Peruvian chef, Gastón Acurio. He left the band to study in Spain, but the other three members kept the band alive and Diego joined to make their musical dreams a reality.

At the end of 1986, they recorded their first song and first hit, "Los Buenos Tiempos". It was a hit during summer of 1987.

A curious thing is that Imágenes did hardly any concerts. Their concerts can be "counted with the fingers" because for its members Imágenes was only a hobby. The most important concert was when they opened the show to Hombres G, when they performed at Colegio San Agustín in October 1987. In August 1988 they released their first and only LP called Nuestra Versión, which contained the hit songs "Los Buenos Tiempos", "Caras Nuevas", "Una Vez Más", "Más Humano", "Sacamos Las Fotos" and "Quién Llora". In June 1988 they released "Caras Nuevas", their new single which also became a hit in Peru, this single had a very successful video-clip.

In Nuestra Versión, Roxana Valdivieso participates in two songs: "Sacamos las fotos", performed by Roxana and Diego and "Más Humano", where she sang in the chorus of the songs. Jean Pierre Magnet also participated playing the saxophone in the songs "Quien llora" and "No sé que voy a hacer". In 1988, they released the third single "Una Vez Más", this song was a very successful hit as "Los Buenos Tiempos" and "Caras Nuevas" were.

In December 1988, Imágenes dissolved because not one of the members worked hard enough to make the band live, because they were dedicated to other things, like acting as in the case of Diego. In three years together, Imágenes had three successful hits and three videoclips, being a very influential band.

In 1989, Diego attempted to begin a solo career. In the 90's, Diego's acting career was very successful, and he was acting in a lot of soap operas and Mini-series. In 1997 Diego released Fuego Azul, his only solo album with the hit songs "Que Dificil Es Amar" which had a video-clip, "El Fuego Que No Ves" and "La Noche", he did a lot of presentations in "La Noche de Barranco, but his priority was his successful acting career.

In 1999, Imágenes reunited for their last concert, 11 years since the band's break-up. The concert was held at the Hard Rock Cafe in Lima, and it was a very nostalgic concert, because all members were already out of the music business and focusing on other priorities. Many Imágenes fans were there, and they performed all their songs. After this last concert Imágenes never reunited again.
