= Michele Pontrandolfo =

Italian explorer (born 1971)

Michele Pontrandolfo (born November 8, 1971) is an Italian explorer who completed at least 15 polar expeditions. He reached the geomagnetic pole unaided in 2006 and is known for his solo expeditions. In 2000 he crossed Greenland from East to West. In 2012 he crossed Greenland from South to North accompanied by his friend Marco Martinuzzi. He reached the Icelandic glacier Vatnajökull on four separate occasions, each time following a different path (a world first). In 2009 Pontrandolfo started from Resolute and reached the geomagnetic pole. His other solo expeditions to polar locations include journeys to the Hielos Continentales, the Svalbard islands and Ellesmere island.

From 2005 to 2006 he was summoned by the 4th Alpine Corps of Bolzano and subsequently the 8th Alpine Regiment in Cividale del Friuli.

He wrote two books about his travels: Stella in capo alla mondo Editoriale Scienza (Giunti Editore) with Andrea Valente in 2008 and Viaggio nella al ghiaccio Biblioteca dell'Immagine in 2010.

In addition to exploration, he enjoys other mountain-based pastimes, including sport climbing, ski mountaineering, mountain biking, athletics and skydiving, of which he has completed 400 jumps.
