= Colegio Italiano Leonardo da Vinci =

Italian international school in Colombia

- Scuola italiana Leonardo Da Vinci

Location
- Carrera 21 No. 127-23; La Calleja; Bogotá, 110121; Colombia; 4.70774°N 74.05142°W

Information
- Established: 1957; 69 years ago
- Website: davinci.edu.co

Colegio Italiano Leonardo da Vinci is an Italian international, private and bilingual school in La Calleja, Bogotá, Colombia.

Named after Leonardo da Vinci, it has scuola infanzia (preschool) through secondaria II grado (liceo) (upper secondary school). It was established in 1957.
