= Vanessa Mendoza =

Colombian politician, actress and fashion model

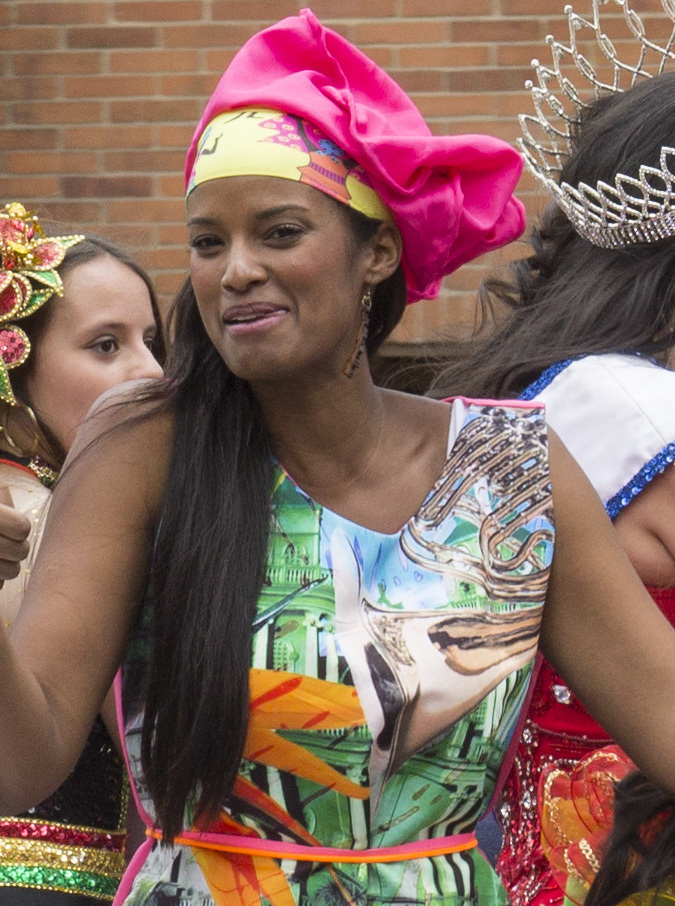
- Born: Vanessa Alexandra Mendoza Bustos; July 25, 1981 (age 45); Quibdo, Chocó, Colombia
- Height: 1.73 m (5 ft 8 in)
- Beauty pageant titleholder
- Title: Miss Chocó 2001; Miss Colombia 2001
- Hair color: Black
- Eye color: Brown
- Major competitions: Miss Colombia 2001 (Winner); Miss Universe 2002 (Unplaced)

Vanessa Alexandra Mendoza Bustos (born 25 July 1981) better known as Vanessa Mendoza, is a Colombian politician, actress, fashion model and beauty pageant titleholder who was crowned Miss Colombia 2001 being the first Afro-Colombian to win that title.

== Biography ==
Mendoza was born in Quibdó, Chocó, Colombia in 1981. She grew up in a small town named Unguía. Mendoza grew up in poverty, and was one of her parents' sixteen children. Her father died when she was still young, leaving her mother to care for the family. Despite the poor conditions the family endured, Vanessa showed early interest in becoming a model, and began pursuing that career.

Mendoza became Miss Chocó in 2001, a year in which Miss Colombia pageant was facing a racism scandal. She became the first Black Miss Colombia, winning the title over first runner-up, Consuelo Guzmán Parra. Despite suspicion that she had won the contest so that rumors about racism would be eradicated, Mendoza became popular among Colombians, who gave her the nickname "Black Barbie". Mendoza was the object of an official reception in Cartagena after her victory, where she declared that she was about representing her race and country.

Mendoza replaced Andrea Nocetti as Miss Colombia. Prior to winning Miss Colombia, Mendoza had the distinction of being the only contestant of the pageant's 2001 version not to admit having a plastic surgery for the contest. Mendoza participated in the Miss Universe 2002 pageant, winning the Best National Costume award.

On March 2, 2005, she and United States comedian Chris Tucker were the key speakers at a speech in Benedict College.

== Politics ==
She won a seat as part of the black minority in Congress and became a member of Chamber of Representatives from 2017 to 2018. Colombia's 10% black minority has the right to two of the 166 seats in the lower congressional chamber.

Preceded by Andrea Nocetti	Miss Colombia; 2001	Succeeded by Diana Mantilla
