= Andrea Aguilera (Colombian model) =

Colombian model and beauty pageant titleholder

- Aguilera in 2021
- Born: Andrea Aguilera Arroyave; Medellín, Antioquia, Colombia
- Education: Luis Amigó Catholic University
- Height: 1.72 m (5 ft 8 in)
- Beauty pageant titleholder
- Title: Miss Mundo Colombia 2021; Miss Earth Colombia 2022; Miss Earth Fire 2022
- Hair color: Black
- Eye color: Brown
- Major competitions: Miss Mundo Colombia 2021; (Winner); Miss World 2022; (Top 13); Miss Earth 2022; (Miss Earth – Fire)

Andrea Aguilera Arroyave is a Colombian beauty pageant titleholder who was crowned Miss World Colombia 2021 and Miss Earth Colombia 2022. She represented Colombia in Miss World 2022 where she managed to be part of the Top 13. She also represented her country in Miss Earth 2022, and was crowned Miss Earth – Fire 2022.

== Early life and education ==
Aguilera was born in the city of Medellín, Antioquia. She grew up in an artistic and active environment, participating in singing competitions, learning to play different instruments and also taking acting courses. She is a graduate of social communication and journalism from the Luis Amigó Catholic University of that city.

== Pageantry ==
=== Miss World 2021 ===
Aguilera represented Colombia in the 70th edition of the Miss World contest, which took place on 16 March 2022, in San Juan, Puerto Rico at the José Miguel Agrelot Coliseum of Puerto Rico and was placed in the top 13, the winner being Karolina Bielawska of Poland.

=== Miss Earth Colombia 2022 ===
On 10 September 2022, Aguilera was appointed by the Miss Earth Colombia organization to represent her country in Miss Earth 2022 to be held in the Philippines.

=== Miss Earth 2022 ===
Aguilera represented Colombia at Miss Earth 2022, and was crowned Miss Earth – Fire 2022. She was a runner-up to eventual winner Mina Sue Choi of South Korea.

Awards and achievements
| Preceded by (Thailand) Jareerat Petsom | Miss Earth – Fire; 2022 | Succeeded by (Thailand) Cora Bliault |
| Preceded by Paulina Ruiz | Miss Earth Colombia; 2022 | Succeeded by Luz Adriana López |
| Preceded by Sara Arteaga Franco | Miss World Colombia; 2021 | Succeeded by Camila Pinzón |
