= Sheridan Mortlock =

Australian model (born 2000)

- Born: 19 May 2000 (age 26); Paddington, Sydney, Australia
- Beauty pageant titleholder
- Title: Miss Earth Australia 2022; Miss Earth Air 2022
- Major competitions: Miss Earth Australia 2020; (Miss Air Australia); Miss Earth Australia 2022; (Winner); Miss Earth 2022; (Miss Earth – Air); (Miss Congeniality); Miss Universe Australia 2025; (Unplaced)

Sheridan Mortlock (born 19 May 2000) is an Australian model and host.

She was crowned Miss Earth Air 2022. By winning Miss Earth – Air 2022, she becomes the third Australian beauty queen to get the Miss Earth – Air title after 2017 and 2015.

== Pageantry ==
=== Miss Earth Australia ===
Mortlock has entered Miss Earth Australia three times.

On 4 September 2022, Mortlock won Miss Earth Australia 2022 at Hyatt Regency in Sydney, Australia, also receiving the special awards; "Darling of the Press", "Best in Swimwear" and "Best in Evening Gown". She was crowned by Miss Earth Australia 2021, Phoebe Soegiono.

=== Miss Earth 2022 ===
By winning Miss Earth Australia 2022, Mortlock was tasked to have advocacy as one of the core requirements for joining Miss Earth. Her advocacy was Action, Care, and Education (ACE). Mortlock added, "Climate change and environmental protection are all linked through webs of connection. If we change one element of the ecosystem, then it will ripple out to others. This is why we must use the pillars of ACE to make the most effective changes. Only through Caring about our environment, Educating ourselves on current environmental changes, and then taking direct Action will we be able to protect Mother Earth."

During the course of the preliminary events, she won the following awards:

- (gold) Darling of the Press (Asia & Oceania)
- (silver) Swimsuit Competition (Asia & Oceania)
- (bronze) Beach Wear Competition (Fire Group)
- Miss Congeniality

Mortlock won Miss Earth – Air 2022, and South Korea's Mina Sue Choi won Miss Earth 2022.

Awards and achievements
Preceded by (United States) Marisa Butler	Miss Earth – Air; 2022	Succeeded by (Philippines) Yllana Aduana
Preceded by Phoebe Soegiono	Miss Earth Australia; 2022	Succeeded by Helen Lātūfeku
