= Luz Adriana López =

Colombian model and beauty pageant titleholder

- Born: Luz Adriana López Ayala; May 10, 1997 (age 29); Bogotá, Cundinamarca Colombia
- Education: Universidad de los Andes
- Height: 1.68 m (5 ft 6 in)
- Beauty pageant titleholder
- Title: Miss Universe Caquetá 2021; Miss Earth Caquetá 2023; Miss Earth Colombia 2023
- Hair color: Dark Brown
- Eye color: Brown
- Major competitions: Miss Universe Colombia 2021; (Unplaced); Miss Earth Colombia 2023; (Winner); Miss Earth 2023; (Unplaced)

Luz Adriana López Ayala (born May 10, 1997) is a Colombian model and beauty pageant titleholder who was crowned Miss Earth Colombia 2023, and represented Colombia at Miss Earth 2023.

== Personal life ==
Luz Adriana López was born in Bogotá, Colombia in 1997 coming from a family of Florencia, Caquetá. She is an environmental engineer from the Universidad de los Andes, with a diploma in strategic sustainable thinking. López is currently pursuing a specialization in project management for results at the Inter-American Development Bank, and works at the Ministry of Environment and Sustainable Development of Colombia. She is also an entrepreneur, model and dancer.

== Pageantry ==
=== Miss Universe Colombia 2021 ===
López participated in Miss Universe Colombia 2021, on 18 October 2021 at the Chamorro City Hall in the city of Bogotá. She competed against 24 other applicants, but was unplaced. The winner of the contest was Valeria Ayos from Cartagena.

=== Miss Earth Colombia 2023 ===
López participated in and won Miss Earth Colombia 2023, on 29 April 2022 in Montenegro, Quindío. She was crowned Miss Earth Colombia 2023 by her predecessor, Andrea Aguilera from Antioquia.

Awards and achievements
| Preceded by Andrea Aguilera | Miss Earth Colombia; 2023 | Succeeded by María Alejandra Camargo |
