= Camila Pinzón =

Miss World Colombia 2022, beauty pageant titleholder, Colombian model

- Born: Camila Andrea Pinzón Jiménez; 1995 or 1996 (age 30–31); Duitama, Boyacá, Colombia
- Education: Sorbonne Nouvelle University Paris 3, Neoma Business school
- Occupation: Model
- Height: 1.75 m (5 ft 9 in)
- Beauty pageant titleholder
- Title: Miss Mundo Colombia 2022
- Major competitions: Miss Universe Colombia 2021; (Top 13); Miss Mundo Colombia 2022; (Winner); Miss World 2023; (Unplaced)

Camila Andrea Pinzón Jiménez (born 1996 or 1997 (age 29–30)) is a Colombian model and beauty pageant titleholder who was crowned Miss World Colombia 2022. Pinzón is the first delegate from Boyacá to be crowned Miss Mundo Colombia. She represented Colombia at Miss World 2023 in Mumbai, India.

== Early life and education ==
Pinzón was born in Duitama, Boyacá to father Javier Pinzón and mother Claudia Jiménez. She speaks Spanish, English, French and Italian. She completed her elementary and high school education at Colegio Campestre Suazapawa in Nobsa, Boyacá. Later, she lived between France and England studying for a degree in applied foreign languages (Langues étrangères appliquées) at the Sorbonne Nouvelle University Paris 3 and a master's degree from NEOMA Business School and a summer course at the Cambridge University.

== Model ==
Pinzón has worked for brands including Louis Vuitton, Dior and Prada. In April 2023, she was interviewed for 2 hours in French by Léa Salamé in Paris, France on the TV show "Quelle époque !" In December 2022, she was interviewed for a few minutes on Polish television in English to talk about her mission of trying to raise awareness about the invasion of Ukraine in Latin America and to send a message of solidarity.

== Pageantry ==
=== Miss Universe Colombia 2021 ===
Pinzón entered Miss Universe Colombia 2021, held on Monday, 18 October 2021 at the Chamorro City Hall in Bogotá. She competed against 24 other applicants and reached the top 13. The winner was Valeria Ayos from Cartagena.

=== Miss World Colombia 2022 ===
Pinzón competed in and won Miss World Colombia 2022, on 20 August 2022 at the Military Club of Army Officers, Bogotá. She also won the Beauty With a Purpose award for her social project. She was crowned by her predecessor, Andrea Aguilera from Antioquia.

=== Miss World 2023 ===
Pinzón represented Colombia at Miss World 2023. on March 2, 2024 in New Delhi, India.

Awards and achievements
Preceded by Andrea Aguilera, Antioquia	Miss World Colombia; 2022	Succeeded by Catalina Quintero, Amazonas
Preceded by Andrea Valentina Rondón, Boyacá	Miss Mundo Boyacá; 2022	Succeeded by Adriana Zayira Castro, Boyacá
Preceded by Laura Michelle Montañez Medina, Boyacá	Miss Universe Boyacá; 2021	Succeeded by Laura Valentina Parra Giraldo, Boyacá
