= María Alejandra Camargo =

Colombian model, architect and beauty pageant titleholder

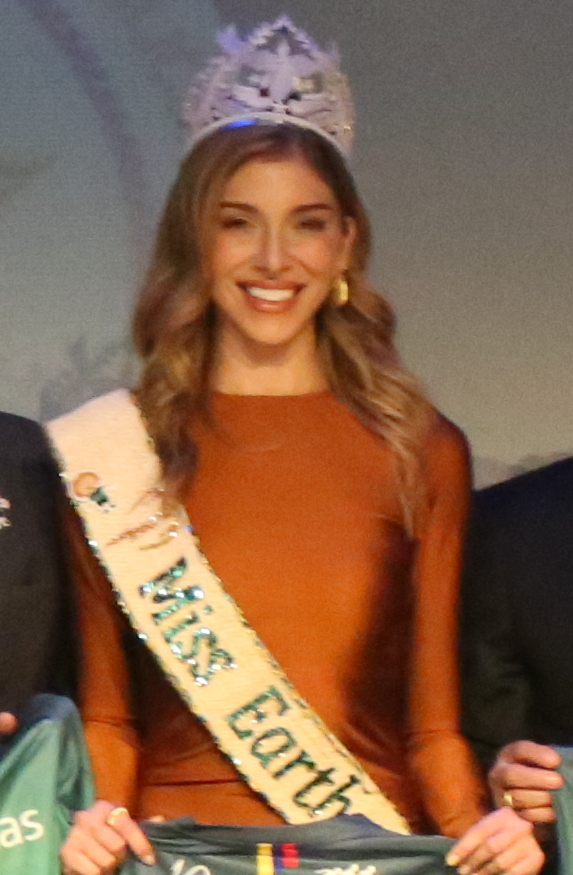
- Born: María Alejandra Camargo Jiménez; September 24, 1997 (age 29); Bucaramanga, Santander, Colombia
- Education: Saint Thomas Aquinas University
- Height: 1.78 m (5 ft 10 in)
- Beauty pageant titleholder
- Title: Miss Earth Colombia 2024
- Hair color: Dark Blonde
- Eye color: Brown
- Major competitions: Miss Universe Colombia 2021; (Unplaced); Miss Earth 2024; (Unplaced)

María Alejandra Camargo Jiménez (born September 24, 1997) is a Colombian model, architect and beauty pageant titleholder who was selected Miss Earth Colombia 2024, she represented Colombia at Miss Earth 2024.

== Personal life ==
María Alejandra Camargo was born in Bucaramanga, Colombia. She is the daughter of Abedulio Camargo and Luz Emilia Jiménez and has one older brother. She studied high school at New Cambridge School in Floridablanca, Santander. while her subsequent academic training took place at Saint Thomas Aquinas University of her city of origin where she graduated as an architect Cum Laude.

== Pageantry ==
=== Miss Universe Santander 2021 ===
María Alejandra was selected as Miss Universe Santander by Natalie Ackermann during the national call and subsequently made official by the Santander government.

=== Miss Universe Colombia 2021 ===
She participated in Miss Universe Colombia 2021, on 18 October 2021 at the Chamorro City Hall in the city of Bogotá. She competed against 24 other applicants, but was Unplaced. The winner of the contest was Valeria Ayos from Cartagena.

=== Miss Earth Colombia 2024 ===
Camargo was designated as Miss Earth Colombia 2024 after a statement from the national organization to the national press on the Instagram account, finally on July 6, 2024, she was publicly named as the representative of her country at Miss Earth 2024.

Awards and achievements
| Preceded by (Caquetá Department) Luz Adriana López | Miss Earth Colombia; 2024 | Incumbent |
| Preceded by Santander Laura Lamus Vargas | Miss Universe Santander; 2021 | Succeeded by Santander Nina María Pinzón |
