= Duitama =

- Municipality and city
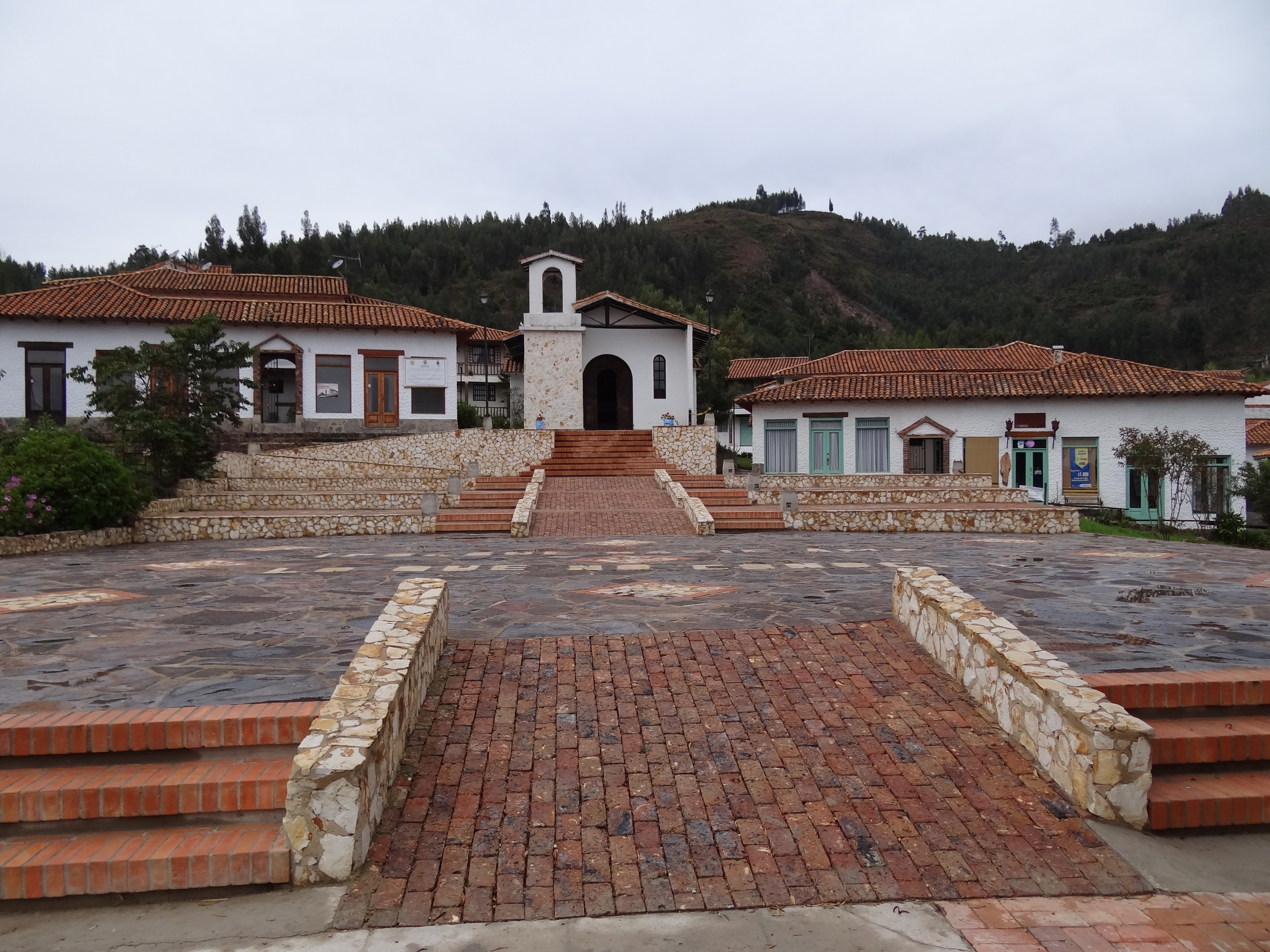
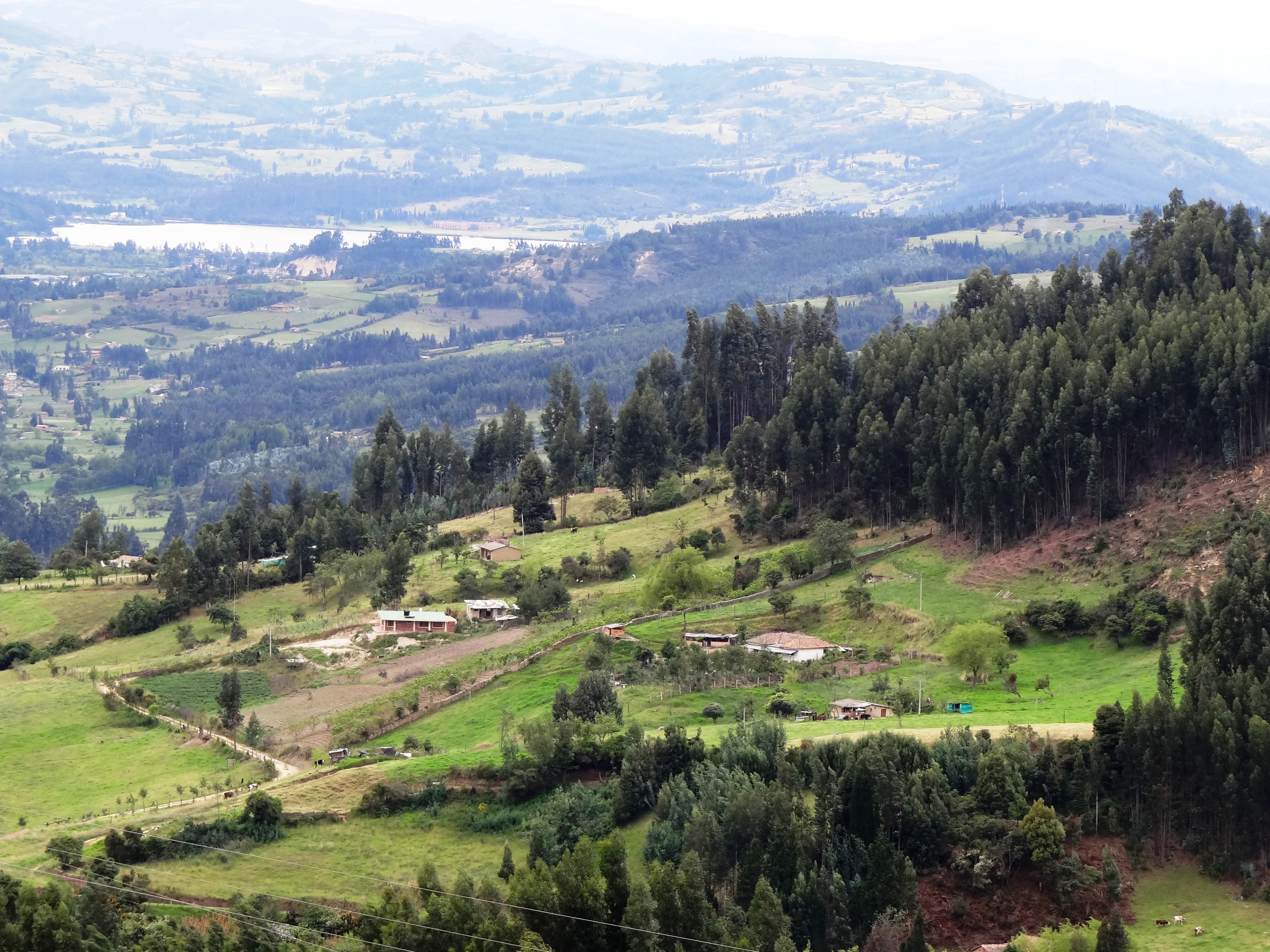
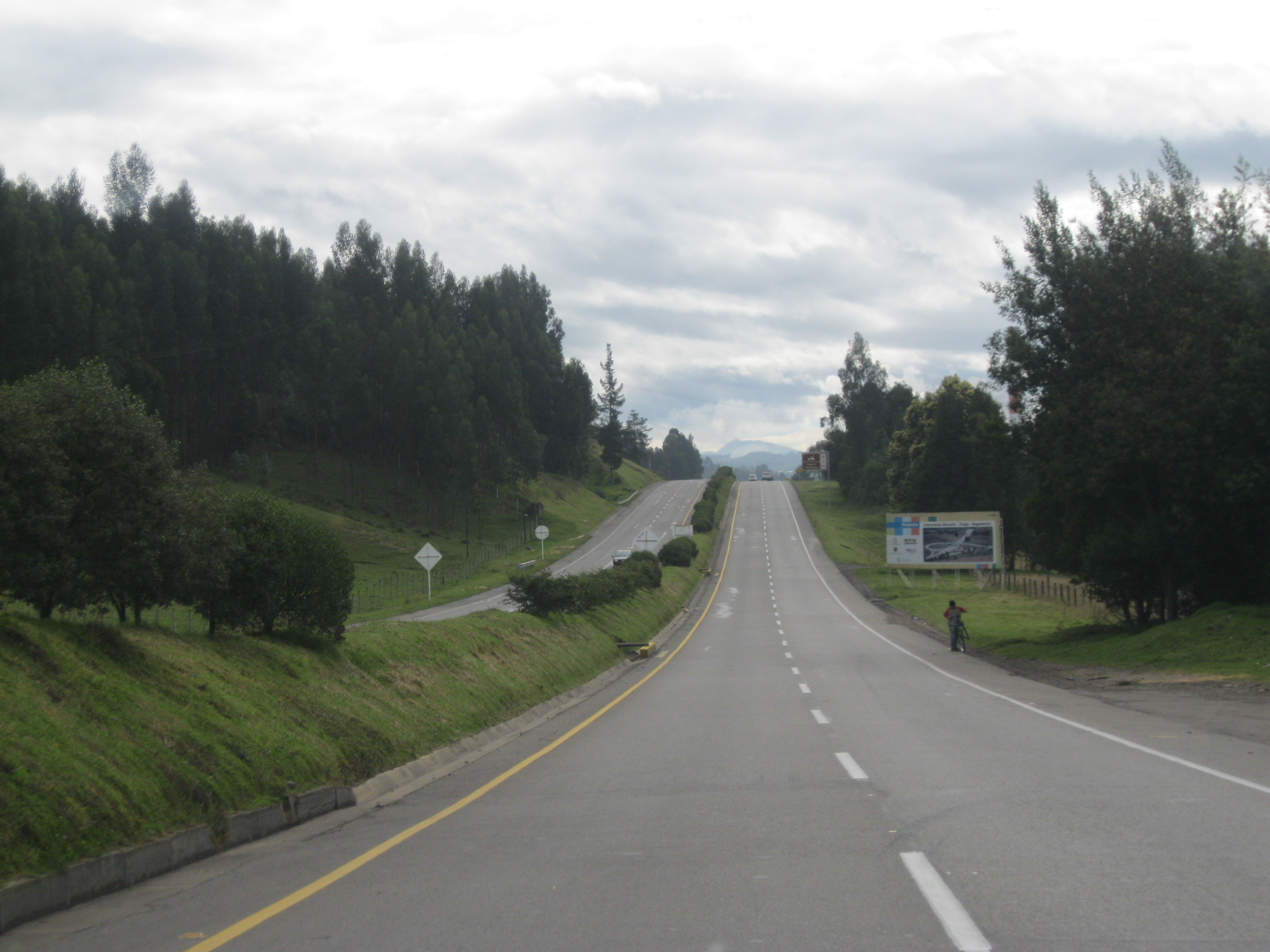
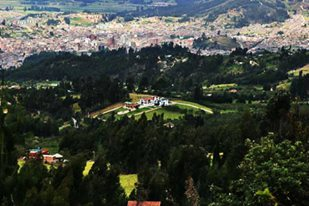
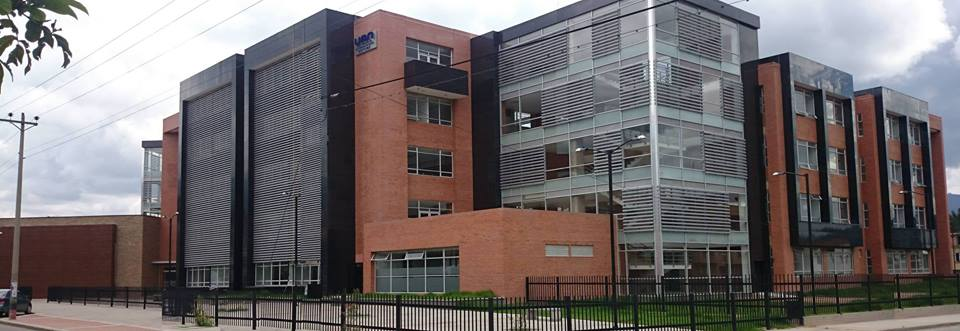
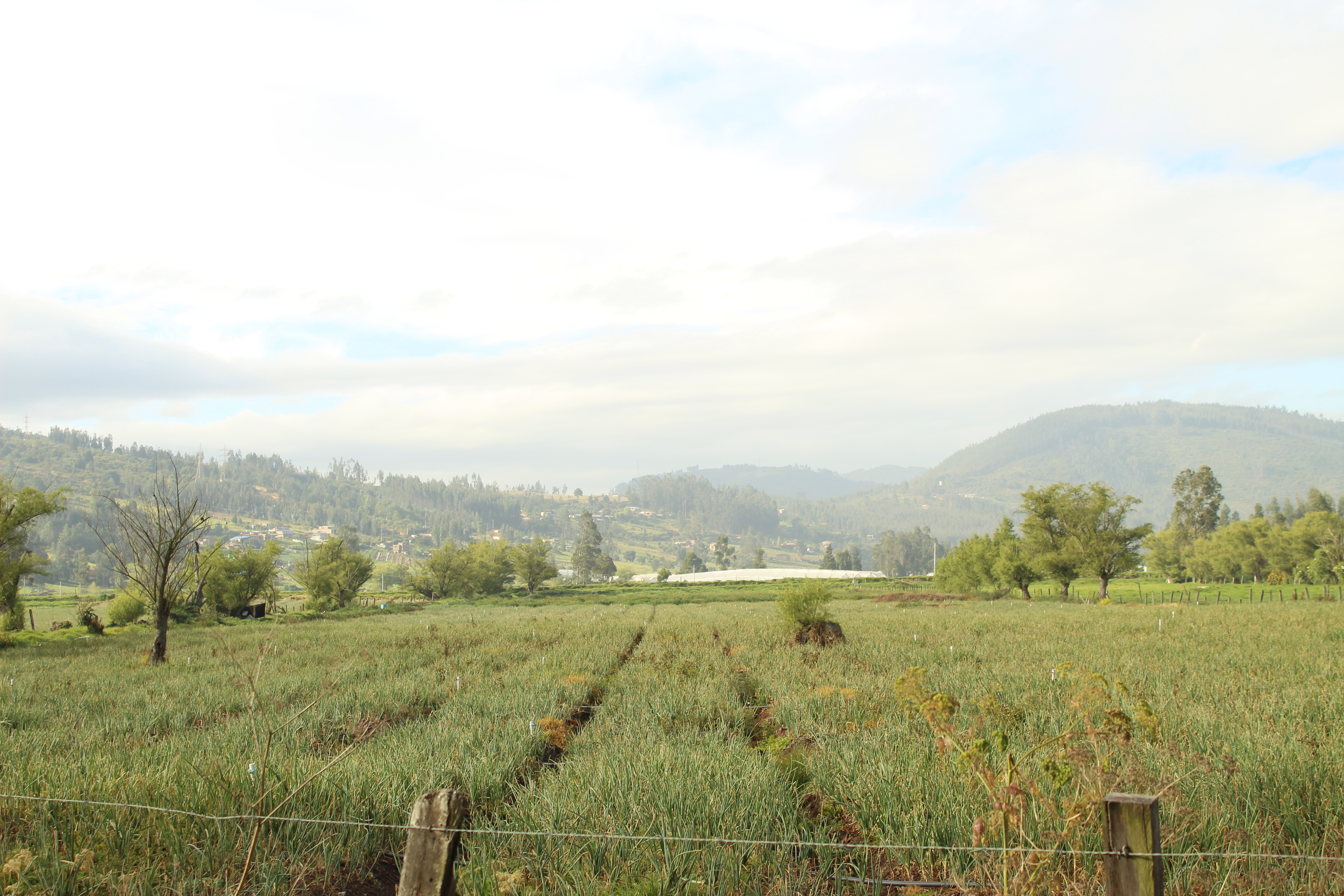
- Top: Pueblito Boyacense, Second: Duitama rural area, Third: Briceño-Tunja-Sogamoso Highway, Fourth: Skyline Duitama, Fifth: Antonio Nariño University - Duitama Campus, Bottom: Onion cultivation in the south of Duitama

- Flag Coat of arms
- Nickname: Perla de Boyacá ("Pearl of Boyacá")
- Location of the town and municipality of Duitama in Boyacá Department
- Coordinates: 5°50′N 73°01′W
- Country: Colombia
- Department: Boyacá
- Province: Tundama Province
- Founded: Pre-Conquest
- Erected: July 27, 1819

Government
  - Type: Municipality
  - Mayor: Jose Luis Bohórquez López (2024–2027)

Area
  - Municipality and city: 266.93 km^{2} (103.06 sq mi)
  - Urban: 12.7 km^{2} (4.9 sq mi)
- Elevation: 2,590 m (8,500 ft)

Population (2023 est.)
  - Municipality and city: 131,591
  - Density: 492.98/km^{2} (1,276.8/sq mi)
  - Urban: 114,192
  - Urban density: 8,990/km^{2} (23,300/sq mi)
- Demonym: Duitamense
- Postal code: 150461-69
- Area code: +7
- Website: Official website

Duitama (Spanish pronunciation: [dwiˈtama]) is a city and municipality in the department of Boyacá. It's the capital of the Tundama Province. Duitama is located 195 kilometres (121 mi) northeast of Bogotá, the capital of Colombia and 50 kilometres (31 mi) northeast of Tunja, the capital of Boyacá. In 2023 Duitama had an estimated population of 131,591.

== Etymology ==
Duitama has existed since pre-Columbian times, when the Muisca inhabited the hills surrounding a former lake in the valley. The original name of Duitama was "Tundama", named after cacique Tundama.

The name of Duitama means "to me the tribute" in muyskkubun (Muisca language). In its beginnings, Duitama corresponded to a Muisca village ruled by the cacique Tundama, a word that changed for Duitama, absolute and powerful lord that he had as bosses tributaries to the Onzaga, Soatá, Chitagoto, Susacón or Cabita, Icabuco, Lupachoque, Sátiva, Tutazá and Cerinza caciques. The natives lived in bohíos, looking for the heights of the plain of the Indians, Tigua, today hills of La Milagrosa, Cargua, La Tolosa, San José (La Alacranera) and Tocogua.

Duitama is known as "The Pearl of Boyacá".

== Geography ==
Duitama, situated on the Altiplano Cundiboyacense is bounded to the north by the department of Santander; Charalá and Encino, to the south by the Boyacá municipalities of Tibasosa and Paipa, to the east with the municipalities of Santa Rosa de Viterbo and Floresta.

== Climate ==
The elevation of the city is about 2,590 metres (8,500 ft) above sea level and the average temperature is 15 °C.

Duitama's climate is subtropical oceanic highland being cool and overcast over the course of the year. The temperature typically varies from 7 °C (45 °F) to 19 °C (67 °F) and is rarely below 4 °C (39 °F) or above 21 °C (70 °F). Sometimes Duitama has reached sub-zero temperatures such as -2,7 °C (27 °F).

Climate data for Duitama (Surbata Bonza), elevation 2,485 m (8,153 ft), (1981–2010)
Month	Jan	Feb	Mar	Apr	May	Jun	Jul	Aug	Sep	Oct	Nov	Dec	Year
Mean daily maximum °C (°F)	22.5 (72.5)	22.7 (72.9)	22.6 (72.7)	21.8 (71.2)	21.3 (70.3)	20.8 (69.4)	20.4 (68.7)	20.5 (68.9)	20.9 (69.6)	21.2 (70.2)	21.5 (70.7)	22.0 (71.6)	21.5 (70.7)
Daily mean °C (°F)	14.3 (57.7)	14.6 (58.3)	14.9 (58.8)	14.9 (58.8)	14.6 (58.3)	14.0 (57.2)	13.7 (56.7)	13.7 (56.7)	13.8 (56.8)	14.0 (57.2)	14.3 (57.7)	14.1 (57.4)	14.2 (57.6)
Mean daily minimum °C (°F)	5.0 (41.0)	5.5 (41.9)	6.6 (43.9)	8.2 (46.8)	7.9 (46.2)	6.8 (44.2)	6.0 (42.8)	6.1 (43.0)	5.9 (42.6)	7.1 (44.8)	7.5 (45.5)	6.3 (43.3)	6.6 (43.9)
Average precipitation mm (inches)	22.9 (0.90)	42.2 (1.66)	75.1 (2.96)	123.6 (4.87)	118.7 (4.67)	67.4 (2.65)	50.5 (1.99)	50.7 (2.00)	76.2 (3.00)	112.2 (4.42)	88.3 (3.48)	41.7 (1.64)	869.6 (34.24)
Average precipitation days (≥ 1.0 mm)	7	9	13	17	18	15	16	16	15	19	16	11	171
Average relative humidity (%)	74	74	76	78	80	79	78	79	78	81	79	76	78
Mean monthly sunshine hours	210.8	163.7	158.1	129.0	130.2	135.0	151.9	145.7	129.0	130.2	156.0	195.3	1,834.9
Mean daily sunshine hours	6.8	5.8	5.1	4.3	4.2	4.5	4.9	4.7	4.3	4.2	5.2	6.3	5.0
Source: Instituto de Hidrologia Meteorologia y Estudios Ambientales

Climate data for Duitama (Sierra La), elevation 2,700 m (8,900 ft), (1981–2010)
Month	Jan	Feb	Mar	Apr	May	Jun	Jul	Aug	Sep	Oct	Nov	Dec	Year
Mean daily maximum °C (°F)	17.3 (63.1)	17.6 (63.7)	17.5 (63.5)	17.3 (63.1)	17.2 (63.0)	17.4 (63.3)	17.1 (62.8)	17.4 (63.3)	17.2 (63.0)	16.8 (62.2)	16.6 (61.9)	16.7 (62.1)	17.2 (63.0)
Daily mean °C (°F)	11.9 (53.4)	12.0 (53.6)	12.1 (53.8)	12.3 (54.1)	12.4 (54.3)	12.3 (54.1)	12.2 (54.0)	12.3 (54.1)	12.1 (53.8)	11.9 (53.4)	11.9 (53.4)	11.9 (53.4)	12.1 (53.8)
Mean daily minimum °C (°F)	7.4 (45.3)	7.8 (46.0)	7.9 (46.2)	8.5 (47.3)	8.5 (47.3)	8.3 (46.9)	7.9 (46.2)	8.0 (46.4)	8.0 (46.4)	8.1 (46.6)	8.1 (46.6)	7.7 (45.9)	8.0 (46.4)
Average precipitation mm (inches)	119.7 (4.71)	138.5 (5.45)	208.9 (8.22)	249.9 (9.84)	210.8 (8.30)	91.5 (3.60)	75.3 (2.96)	88.6 (3.49)	137.1 (5.40)	251.6 (9.91)	216.0 (8.50)	128.3 (5.05)	1,907.5 (75.10)
Average precipitation days (≥ 1.0 mm)	17	17	22	24	23	16	17	16	18	24	24	20	238
Average relative humidity (%)	84	85	86	88	87	84	82	82	83	87	88	87	85
Mean monthly sunshine hours	151.9	124.2	105.4	75.0	83.7	102.0	117.8	120.9	108.0	89.9	93.0	124.0	1,295.8
Mean daily sunshine hours	4.9	4.4	3.4	2.5	2.7	3.4	3.8	3.9	3.6	2.9	3.1	4.0	3.6
Source: Instituto de Hidrologia Meteorologia y Estudios Ambientales

== History ==
Duitama in the times before the Spanish conquest was called Tundama.

=== Conquest of Duitama ===
Before the Spanish conquest, the Muisca were organized in a loose Muisca Confederation. The confederation was composed of four main political and religious leaders, from south to north; the zipa based in Bacatá, the zaque of Hunza, the iraca of Sugamuxi and the Tundama of Duitama, then called Tundama. Additionally, more independent caciques governed other villages.

The Tundama ruled over the villages of Onzaga, Soatá, Chitagoto, Susacón, Icabuco, Lupachoque, Sátiva, Tutazá and Cerinza. The Tundama lived on the hill currently called La Tolosa.

In 1536, Spanish conquistador Gonzalo Jiménez de Quesada set foot from the Caribbean coastal city of Santa Marta towards the inner highlands of then unexplored Colombia with an army of 800 men. After conquering the southern areas of the Muisca, accessed from the shores of the Magdalena River he and a reduced number of troops marched towards the northern Muisca territories. He first submitted Hunza, the seat of the zaque and in September 1537 he arrived in Sugamuxi, sacred City of the Sun where his soldiers burned the Sun Temple.

The cacique Tundama heard about the invading foreigners and tried to win time while hiding his treasures from the Spanish. One of his men proposed to surrender to the soldiers armed with superior weapons, and Tundama cut off his ears and left hand.

At the end of 1539, another Spanish conquistador who proved himself in the Kingdom of Quito and Peru, Baltasar Maldonado, entered the Tundama territories and after several battles Tundama surrendered to the Spanish rule. Tundama was killed by a hammer of Maldonado in late December 1539.

==== Tundama in Muisca history ====
History of the Muisca
Altiplano	Muisca	Art	Architecture	Astronomy	Cuisine	El Dorado	Subsistence	Women	Conquest

=== Colonial period ===
During the colonial period of the newly established state New Kingdom of Granada, Duitama was converted to catholicism by friars of Santo Domingo, arriving in 1556. They held their positions until 1775.

Modern Duitama was not founded until 1819, before Simón Bolívar liberated the later state of Gran Colombia from the Spanish rule.

=== Modern age ===
Duitama was an agricultural community that grew after the installation of the train station in 1923 and the connection with the Colombian capital via highway. From 1950 onwards the city hosted more industry.

== International events ==
In 1995, Duitama was the second city in Latin America to host the UCI Road World Championships. The first city to host that event was San Cristóbal, Venezuela in 1977.

== Tourism ==
In Duitama the touristic village Pueblito Boyacense is a popular destination. The village is composed of colonial houses.

== Born in Duitama ==
- Camila Pinzón, model and Miss World Colombia 2022
- Alberto Camargo, former professional cyclist
- Édgar Fonseca, professional cyclist
- Daniel Rincón, former professional cyclist
- Oliverio Rincón, former professional cyclist
- Francisco Rodríguez Maldonado, former professional cyclist
- Grace de Gier, singer and songwriter

== Gallery ==
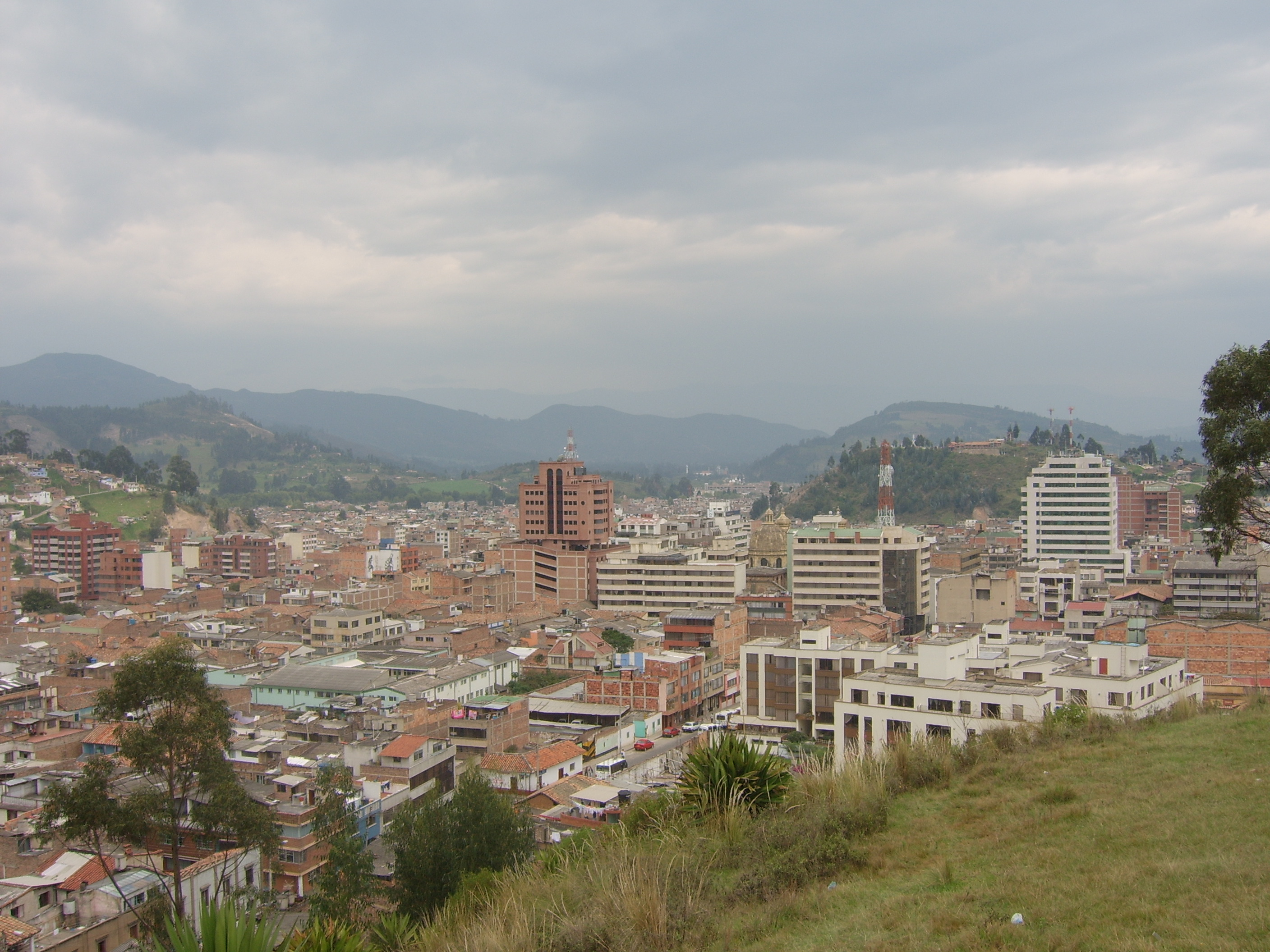
Duitama's Downtown

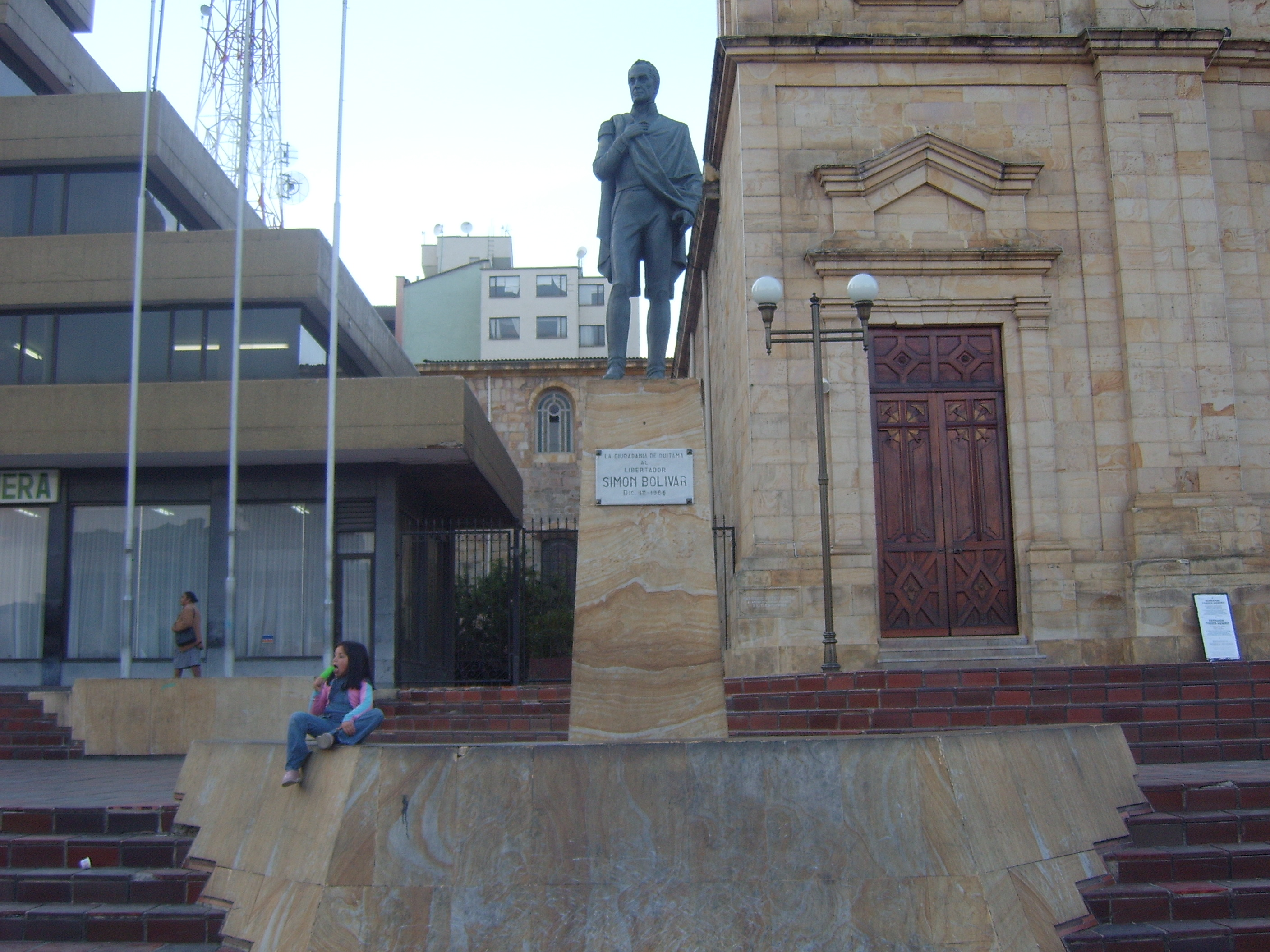
Simón Bolívar (Plaza Libertadores)

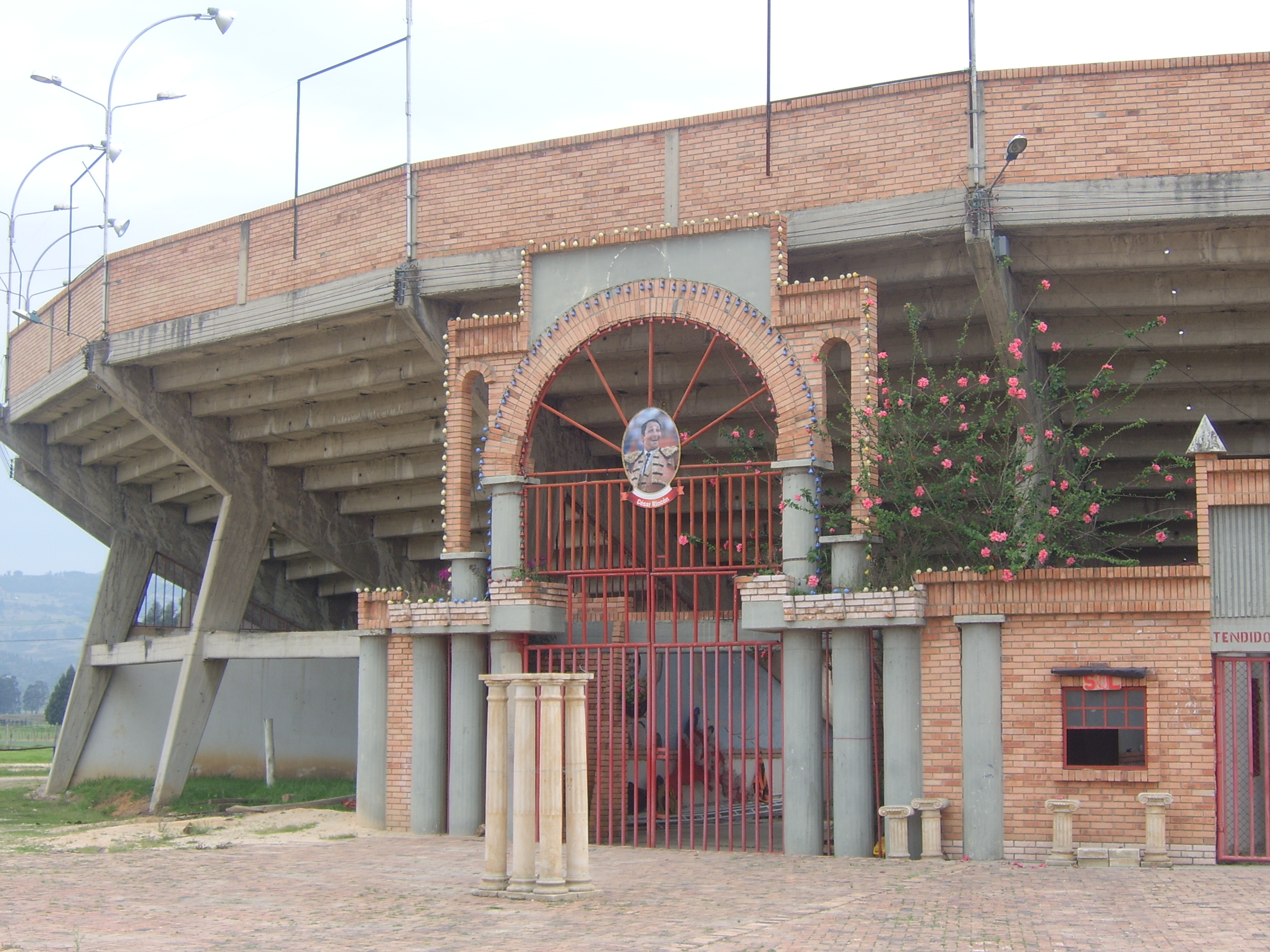
Julio César Rincón Ramirez bull fighting arena

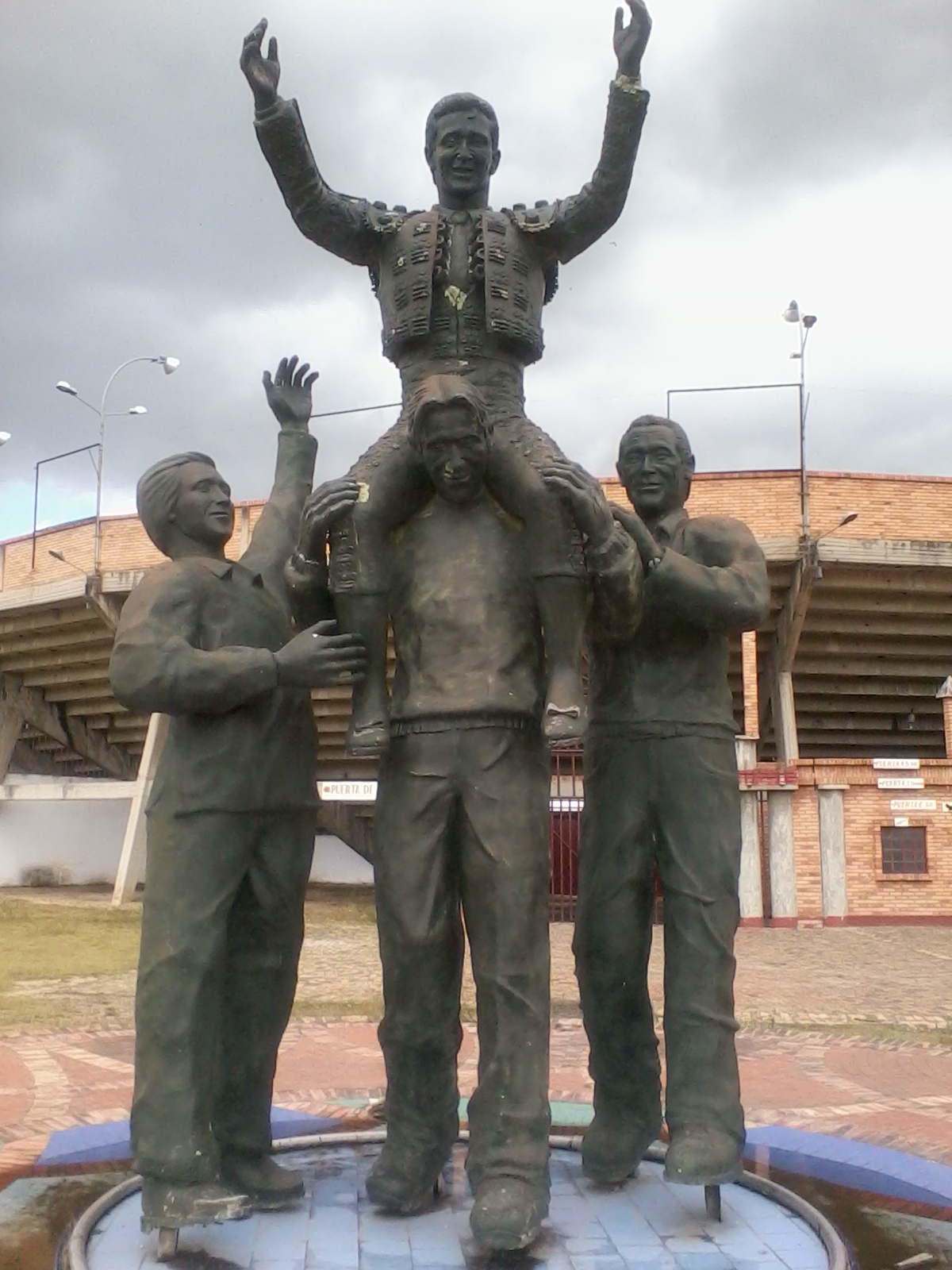
Monument to bull fighter César Rincón

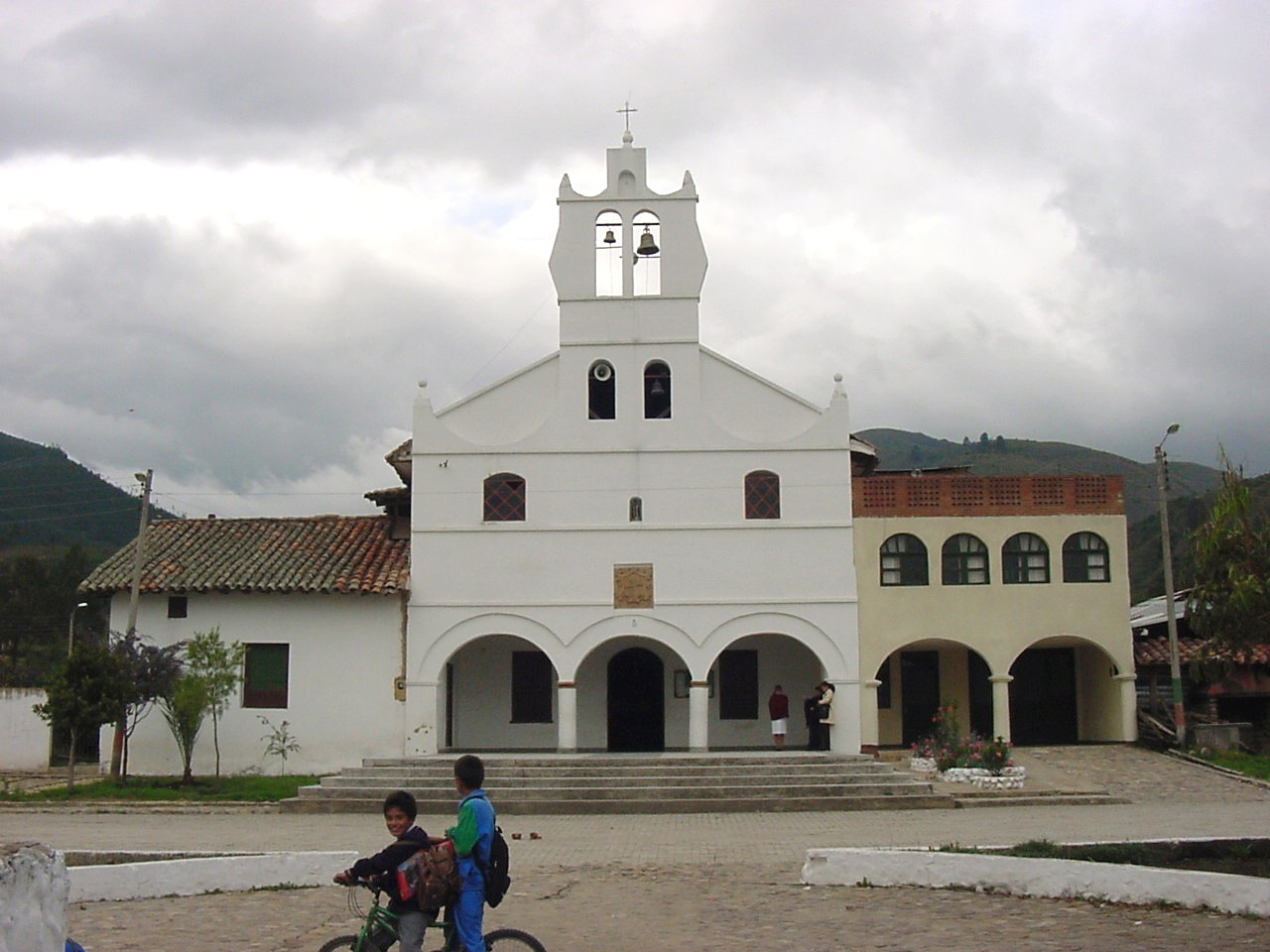
Church La Trinidad

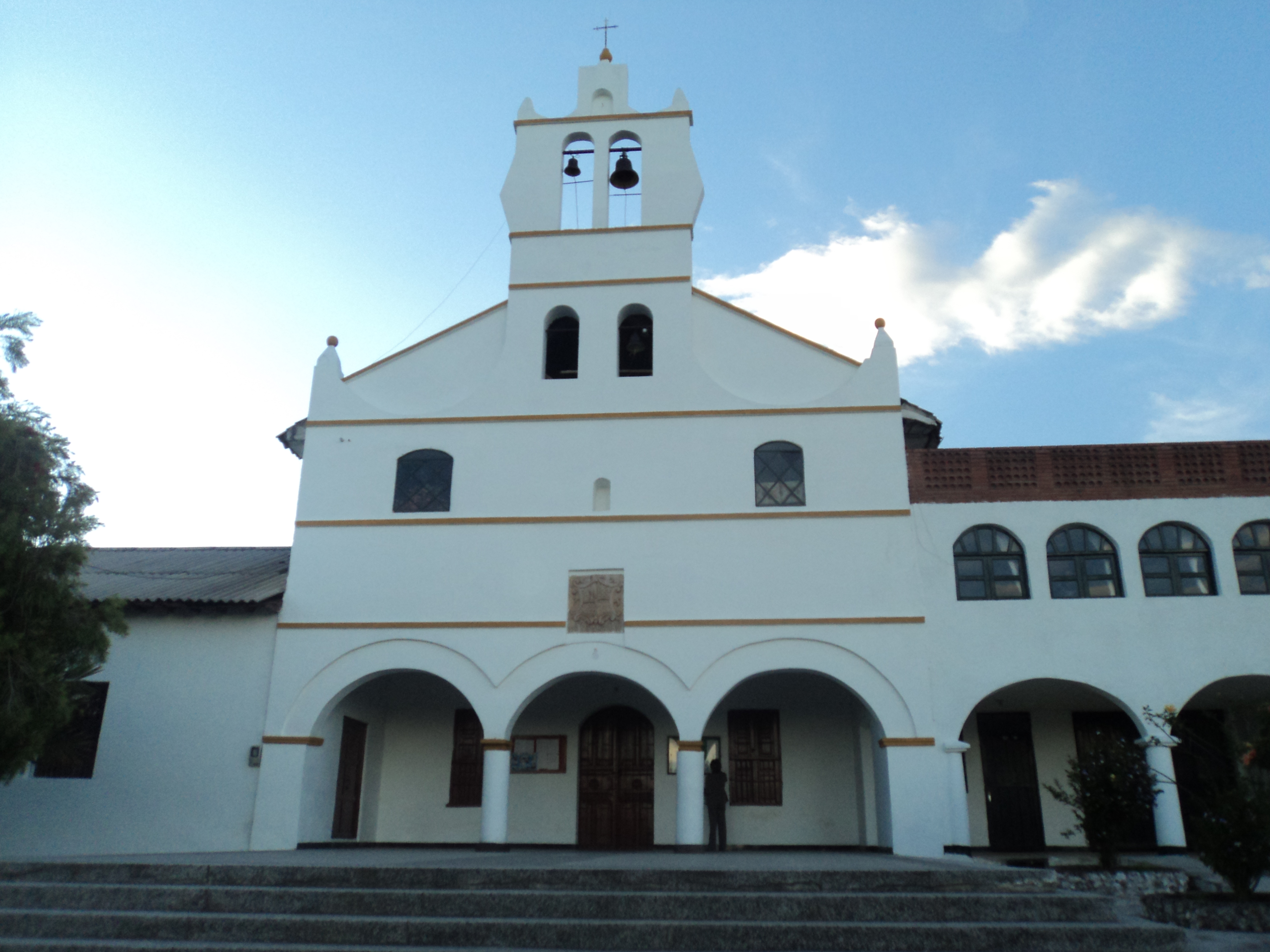
La Trinidad
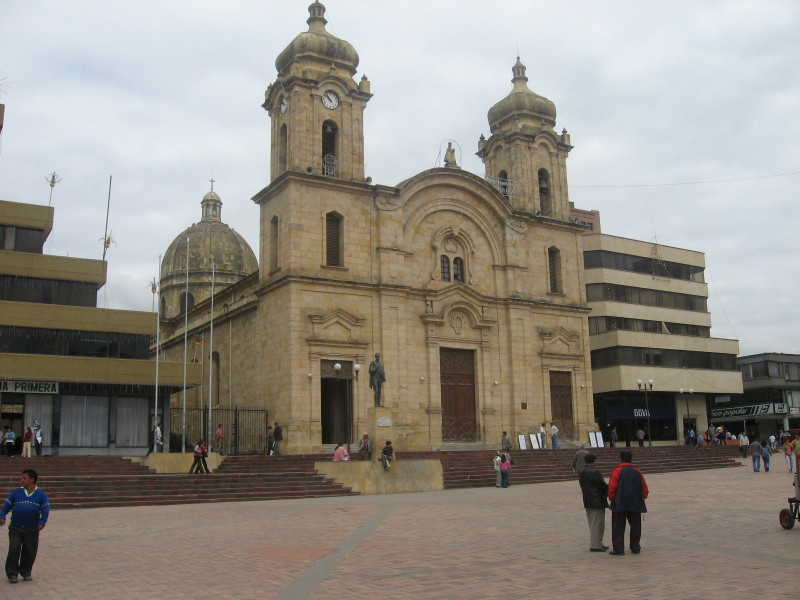
Cathedral of Duitama

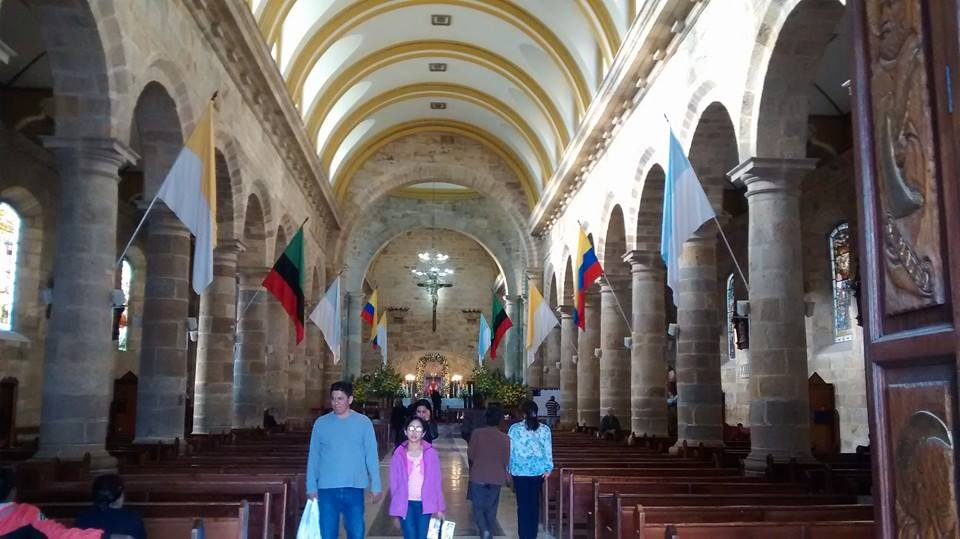
Cathedral interior

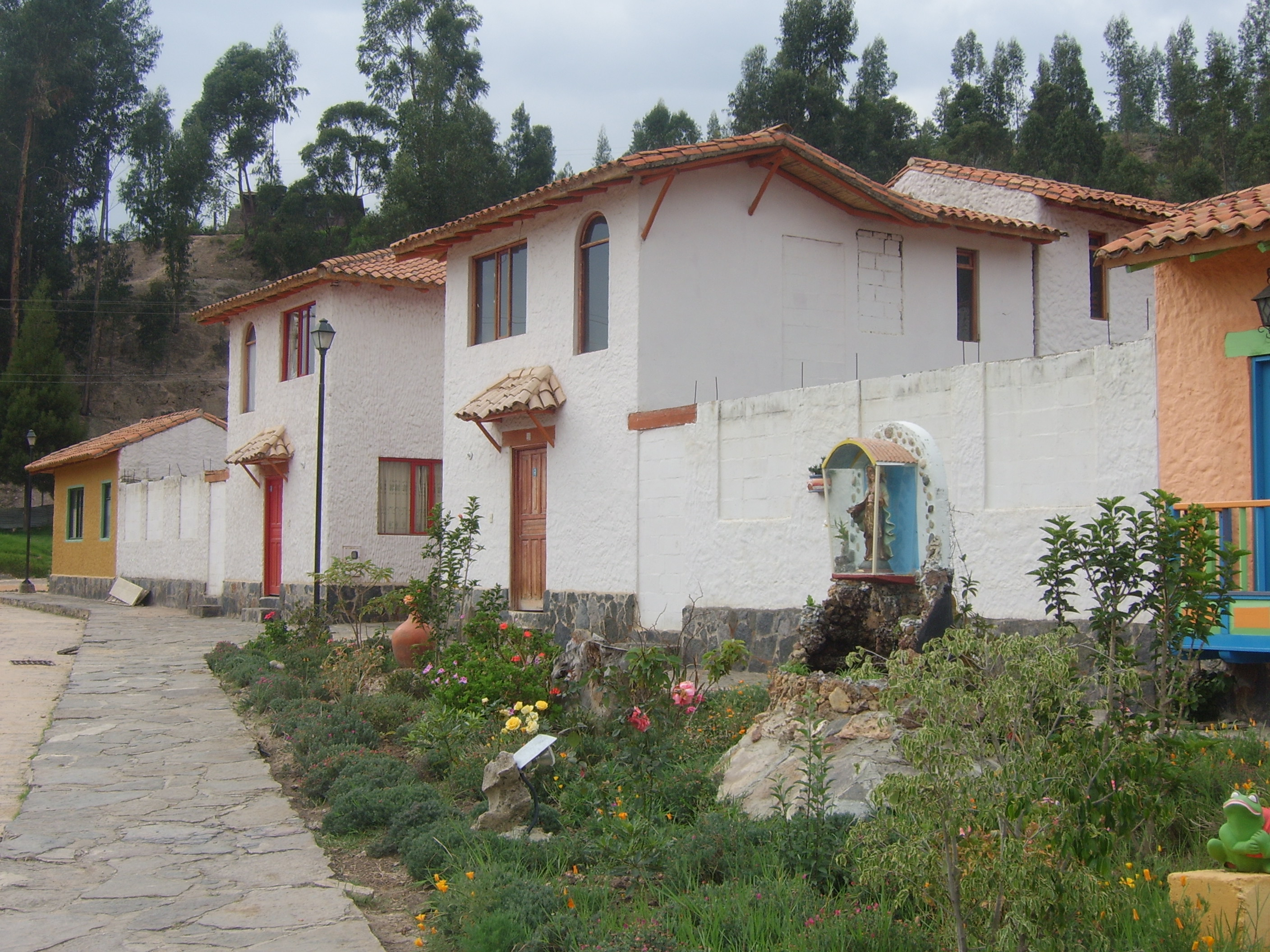
Pueblito Boyacense

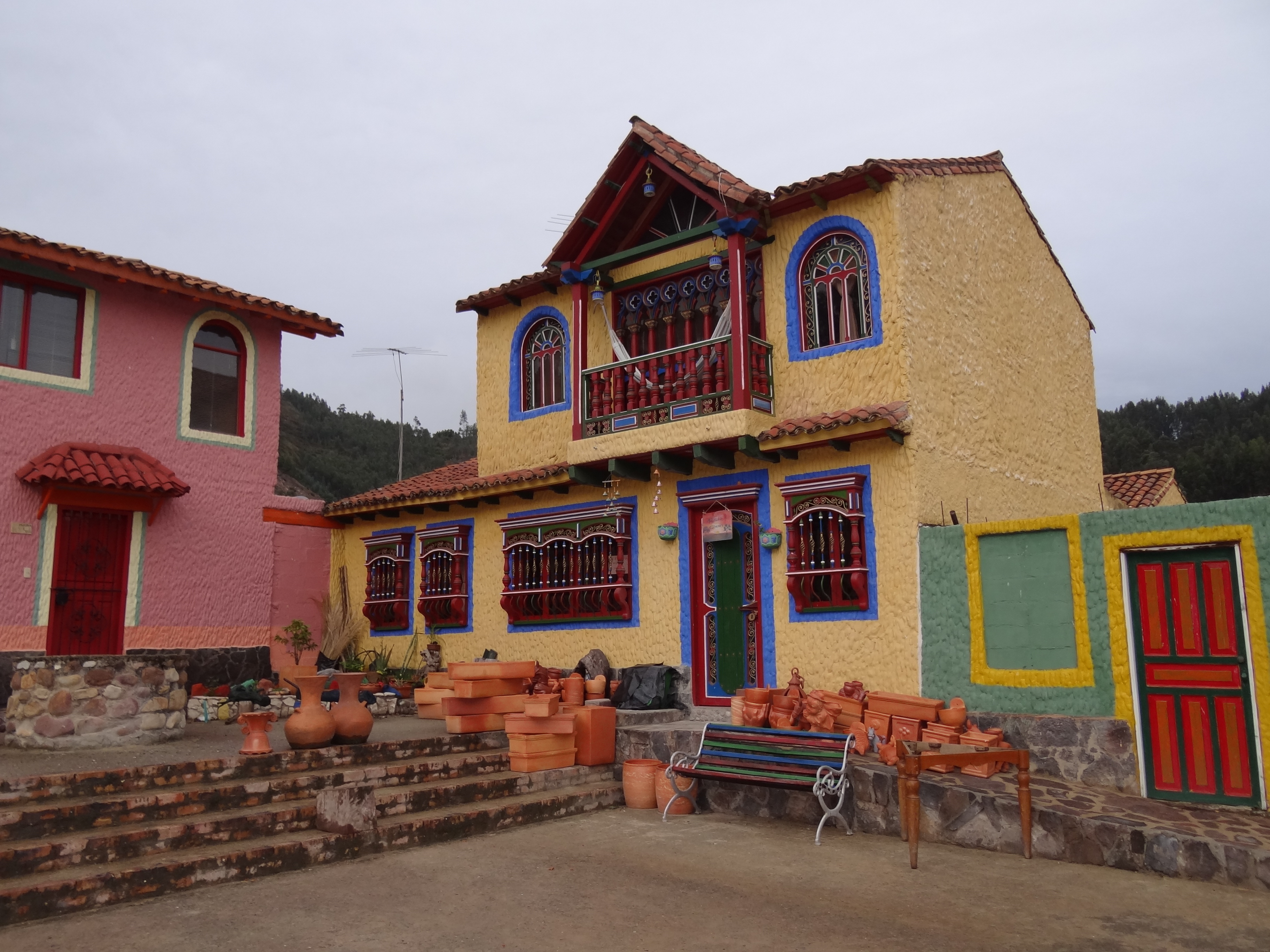
Pueblito Boyacense

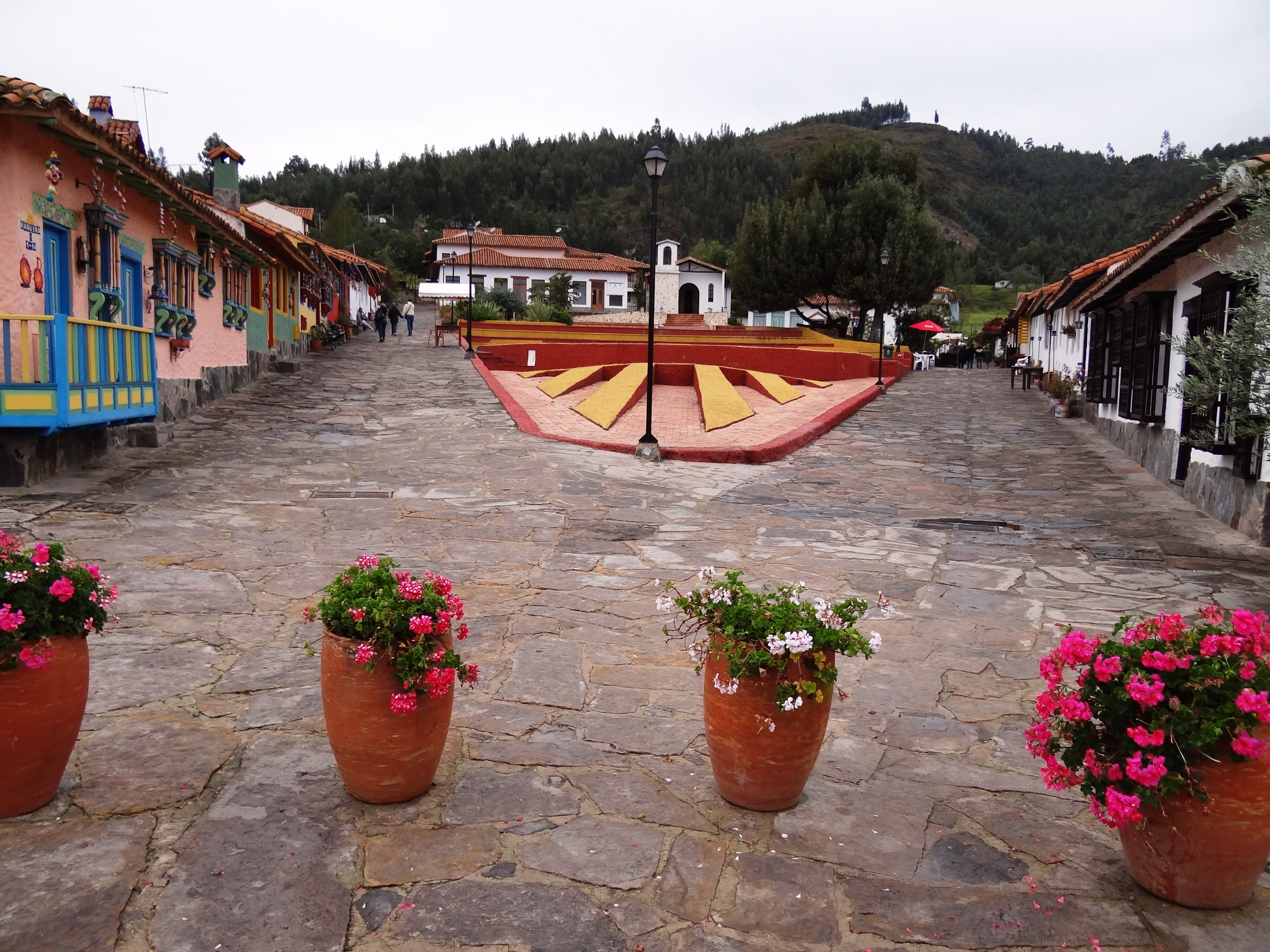
Pueblito Boyacense
