= Alejandra Villafañe =

Colombian model and actress (1989–2023)

Alejandra Villafañe Osorio
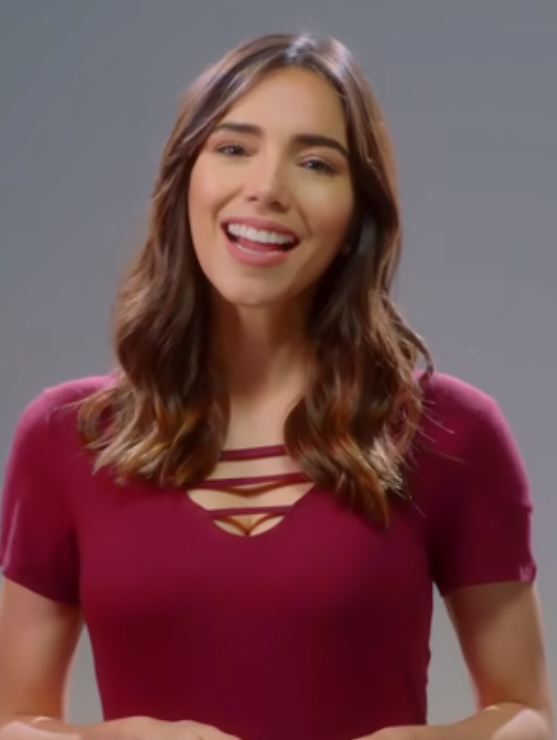
- Villafañe in 2018
- Born: 8 October 1989; Zarzal, Colombia
- Died: 21 October 2023 (aged 34); Bogotá, Colombia
- Height: 1.73 m (5 ft 8 in)
- Beauty pageant titleholder
- Title: Actress; Miss Earth Colombia 2014
- Hair color: Brown
- Eye color: Brown
- Major competitions: Miss Earth 2014 (Top 16)

María Alejandra Villafañe Osorio (8 October 1989 – 21 October 2023) was a Colombian actress, model and beauty pageant titleholder who was crowned as Miss Earth Colombia 2014.

== Pageantry ==
After unsuccessfully attempting to enter the Señorita Valle pageant in 2013, in 2014 Villafañe decided to compete in the Miss Earth Colombia pageant, eventually going on to represent Sierra Nevada de Santa Marta and winning the competition. By winning the title, she entered the Miss Earth 2014 competition, placing among the Top 16 semi-finalists.

== Later career ==
Shortly after her pageant win Villafañe started appearing in numerous telenovelas and television series, initially playing minor roles, which gradually became more prominent. She made her last appearances in 2023, in the film El yuppie y el guis and in the Amazon Prime Video series Manes.

== Death ==
Diagnosed with cancer in May 2023, Villafañe died on 21 October 2023, at the age of 34. At the time of her death, she was engaged to actor Raul Ocampo.

Awards and achievements
Preceded by Carolina Ortegón	Miss Earth Colombia; 2014	Succeeded by Estefania Muñoz
