= Miss Universe Colombia 2021 =

2nd Miss Universe Colombia pageant

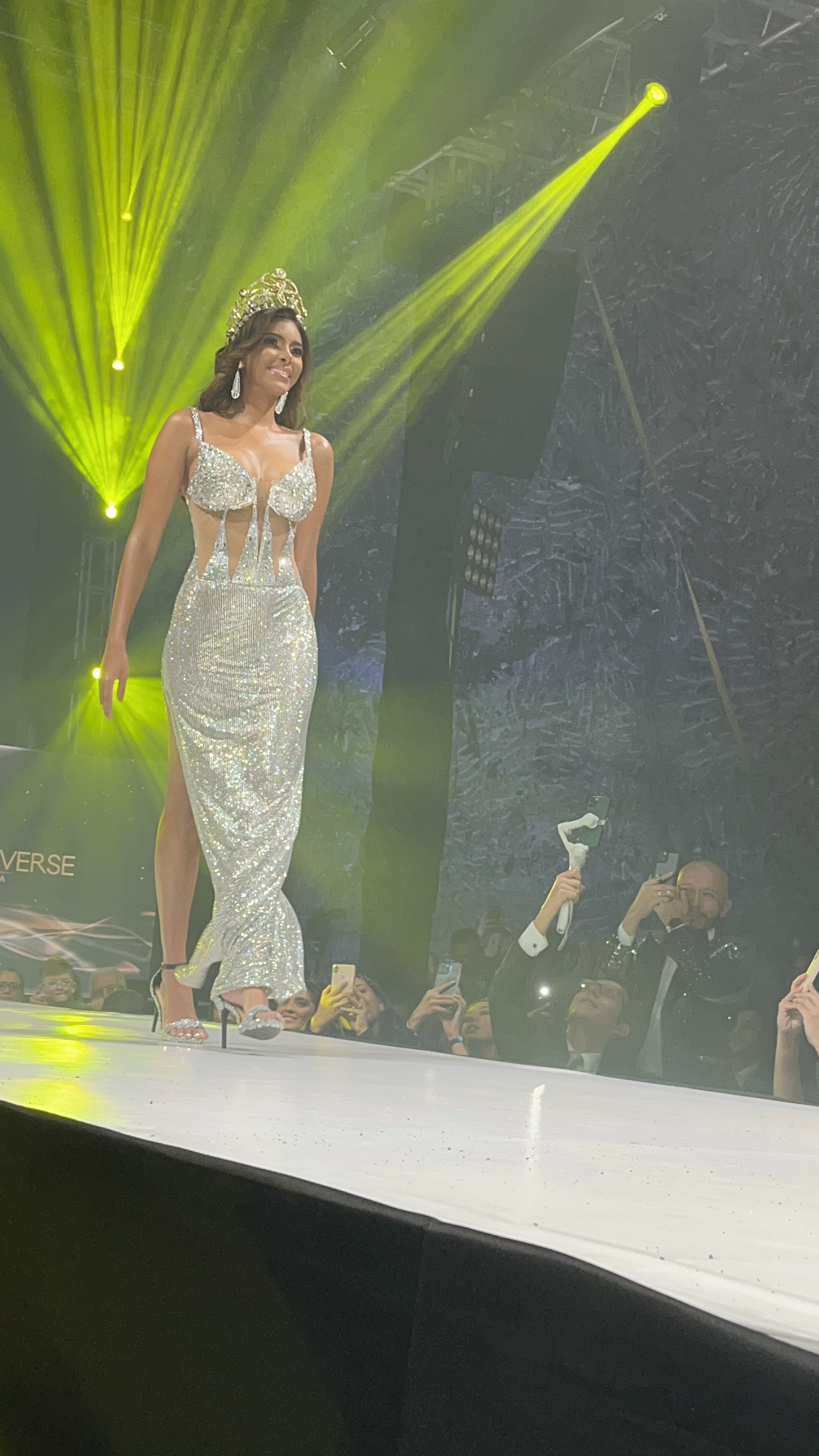
- Valeria Ayos
- Date: October 18, 2021
- Presenters: Laura Barjum; Renzy Konper; Laura Olascuaga
- Entertainment: Carolina Gaitán; Herencia de Timbiqui; Pipe Bueno; Mau y Ricky
- Venue: Chamorro City Hall, Bogotá, Colombia
- Broadcaster: RCN Televisión
- Entrants: 24
- Placements: 13
- Debuts: Buenaventura; Cali; Sucre
- Withdrawals: Arauca; Cauca; Cesar; El Encanto; Guaviare; Magdalena; Nariño; Putumayo; Vichada
- Winner: Valeria Ayos; Cartagena

Miss Universe Colombia 2021 was the second edition of the Miss Universe Colombia pageant, held at the Chamorro City Hall in Bogotá, Colombia, on October 18, 2021.

Laura Olascuaga of Bolívar crowned Valeria Ayos of Cartagena as her successor at the end of the event. She represented Colombia at the Miss Universe 2021 competition in Eilat, Israel and placed Top 5.

== Results ==
=== Placements ===
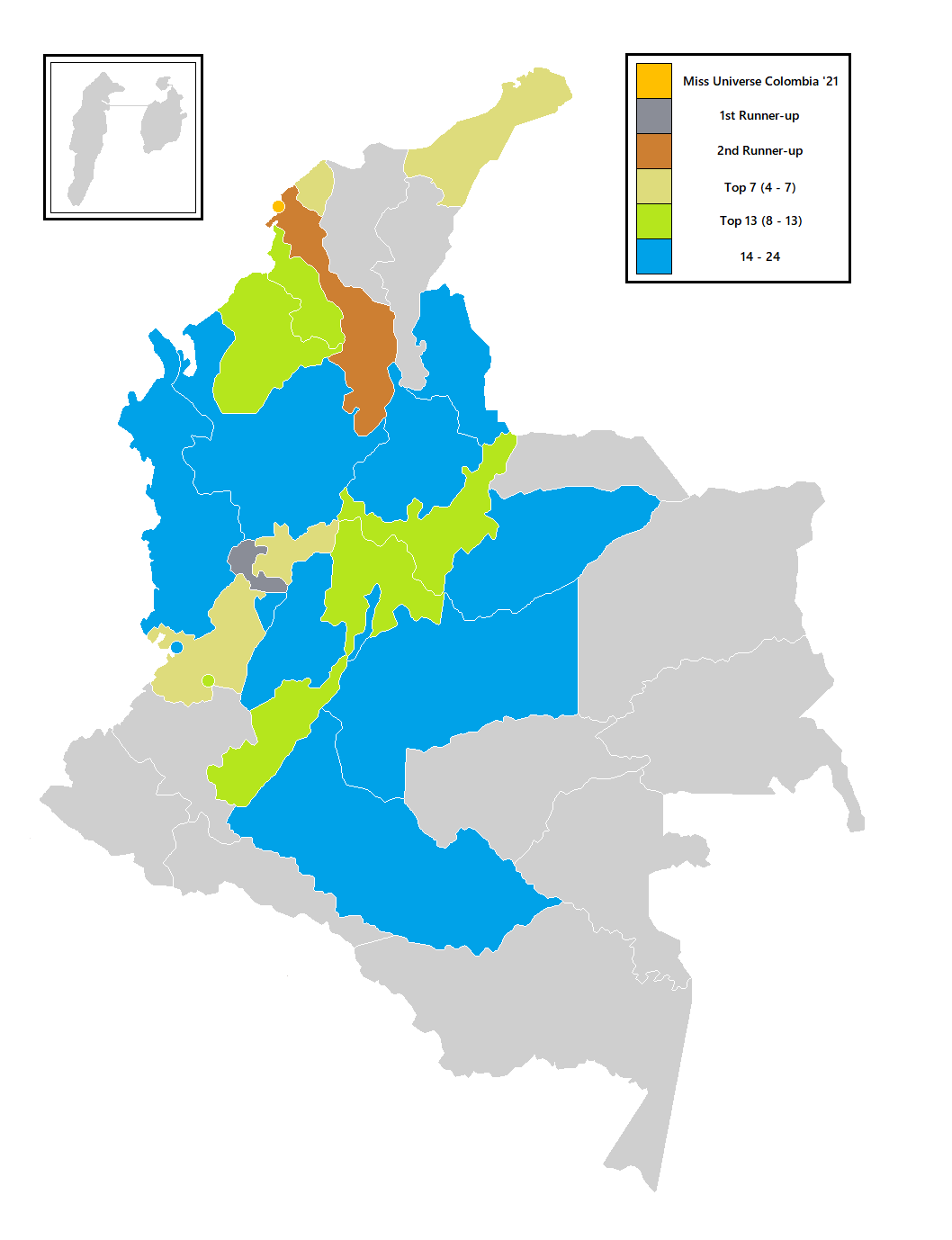
Official results

Placement	Contestant
Miss Universe Colombia 2021	Cartagena – Valeria Ayos
1st Runner-Up	Risaralda – María Alejandra López
2nd Runner-Up	Bolívar – Franselys Santoya *
Top 7	Atlántico – Paula Pallares; Caldas – Estefanía García; La Guajira – Valentina Macías; Valle del Cauca – Valeria Gálvez
Top 13	Boyacá – Camila Andrea Pinzón; Cali – Valeria Acosta; Córdoba – Alejandra López; Cundinamarca – Ángela Briceño; Huila – Yenifer Perdomo; Sucre – Viviana Márquez

* Voted into Top 13 by viewers.

=== Miss Universe Colombia 2022 ===
The Miss Universe Colombia 2022 was appointed by the organization to represent Colombia at Miss Universe 2022.

Title	Contestant
Miss Universe Colombia 2022	Quindío – María Fernanda Aristizábal

== Contestants ==
24 delegates have been selected:

Department/City	Delegate	Age (Note: Ages at the time of the pageant)	Placement
Antioquia	Andrea Jaramillo Vásquez	26	
Atlántico	Paula Andrea Pallares Pertuz	25	Top 7
Bogotá	Diana Marcela Hernández Toro	20	
Bolívar	Franselys Santoya Ariza	27	2nd Runner-Up
Boyacá	Camila Andrea Pinzón Jiménez	25	Top 13
Buenaventura	Matilde Lina López Moreno	27	
Caldas	Estefanía García Orozco	19	Top 7
Cali	Valeria Acosta Muñoz	25	Top 13
Caquetá	Luz Adriana López Ayala	24	
Cartagena	Valeria Maria Ayos Bossa	27	Miss Universe Colombia 2021
Casanare	Hilsse Olmir Barrios Torres	25	
Chocó	Keidy Johena Lemos Mena	26	
Córdoba	Alejandra López Castilla	25	Top 13
Cundinamarca	Ángela Daniela Briceño Rojas	27	Top 13
Huila	Yenifer Alexandra Perdomo Mora	25	Top 13
La Guajira	Valentina Macías Ortega	23	Top 7
Meta	Laura Carolina Linares Ardila	21	
Norte de Santander	Lizeth Carolina Bunzel Ospina	27	
Quindío	Melissa Hernández Graciano	24	
Risaralda	Maria Alejandra López Peréz	27	1st Runner-Up
Santander	María Alejandra Camargo Jiménez	23	
Sucre	Viviana Marcela Peña Márquez	27	Top 13
Tolima	Andrea Marcela Escobar Moreno	24	
Valle del Cauca	Valeria Gálvez Lombana	21	Top 7

== Judges ==
- Olivia Quido – Businesswoman, Jury president
- Luis Alfonso Borrego – Television presenter
- Alexander González Aguilar – Pageant coach
- Bárbara de Regil – Actress
- Luisa Fernanda W – Influencer
