= Miss Mundo Colombia =

Beauty pageant

- Formation: 1963
- Type: Beauty pageant
- Headquarters: Bogotá
- Location: Colombia
- Members: Miss World
- Official language: Spanish
- President: Édgar Botero Henao
- Website: Official website

Miss Mundo Colombia or Miss World Colombia is a national Beauty pageant that selects Colombia's representative to the Miss World pageant. On occasion, when the winner does not qualify (due to age) for either contest, a runner-up is sent. The current Miss World Colombia is Catalina Quintero from Amazonas.

== Titleholders ==
Color key

- : Declared as Winner
- : Ended as Runner-Up
- : Ended as one of the Finalists or Semi-finalists

Year	Miss Mundo Colombia	Department	Placement	Special Award(s)
1992	Wguerddy Alejandra Oviedo Vargas	San Andrés Island	Unplaced	
1993	Silvia Isabel Durán Angarita	Santander	Unplaced	
1994	María Eugenia González Ponce de León	Cauca	Unplaced	
1995	Diana Maria Figueroa Castellanos	Tolima	Unplaced	
1996	Carolina Arango Corrales	Risaralda	1st Runner-Up	Miss World Americas
1997	Gladys Buitrago Caicedo	Caldas	Unplaced	
1998	Mónica Marcela Cuartas Jiménez	Antioquia	Unplaced	
1999	Mónica Elizabeth Escolar Danko	Atlántico	Unplaced	
2000	Andrea Duran	Bogotá	Top 10	
2001	Jeisyl Amparo Vélez Giraldo	Caldas	Unplaced	
2002	Natalia Peralta Castro	Antioquia	1st Runner-Up	Miss World Americas
2003	Claudia Milena Molina Torres	Cartagena	Unplaced	
2004	Paola Andrea Mariño García	Bogotá	Unplaced	
2005	Erika Querubín	Antioquia	Unplaced	
2006	Elizabeth Loaiza Junca	Valle del Cauca	Unplaced	
2007	María José Torrenegra Ariza	Atlántico	Unplaced	
2008	Katherine Medina Montoya	Antioquia	Unplaced	
2009	Daniela Ramos Lalinde	Bogotá	Top 7	Miss World Golf (Best Individual Award)
2010	Laura Marcela Palacio Restrepo	Antioquia	Top 25	
2011	Mónica Andrea Restrepo Villamil	Bogotá	Unplaced	
2012	Bàrbara Cristina Turbay Ridao	Bogotá	Top 30	
2013	Daniella Ocoró Mejia	Valle del Cauca	Unplaced	
2014	Jessica Leandra García Caicedo	Nariño	Unplaced	
2015	María Alejandra López Pérez	Risaralda	Unplaced	
2016	Shirley Viviana Atehortua Ríos	Risaralda	Unplaced	Beauty with a Purpose (Top 24)
2017	Maria Beatríz Daza Núñez	La Guajira	Top 40	Head to Head Challenge (Group 5/Winner); Miss World Top Model (Top 30)
2018	Laura Osorio Hoyos	Medellín	Unplaced	
2019	Sara Arteaga Franco	Medellín	Unplaced	
2020	Due to the impact of COVID-19 pandemic, no pageant in 2020			
2021	Andrea Aguilera Arroyave	Antioquia	Top 13	Head to Head Challenge (Round 2)
2022	Due to the impact of COVID-19 pandemic, no pageant in 2022			
2023	Camila Andrea Pinzón Jiménez	Boyacá	Unplaced	
2024	No competition held			
2025	Catalina Quintero Fernández	Amazonas	Unplaced	
2026	Andrea Romero	Atlántico	Unplaced	
2027	María José Rojas	Medellín	TBA	

== See also ==
- Miss Colombia
- Miss Universe Colombia
- Miss Earth Colombia
- Miss Grand Colombia
