= Grace de Gier =

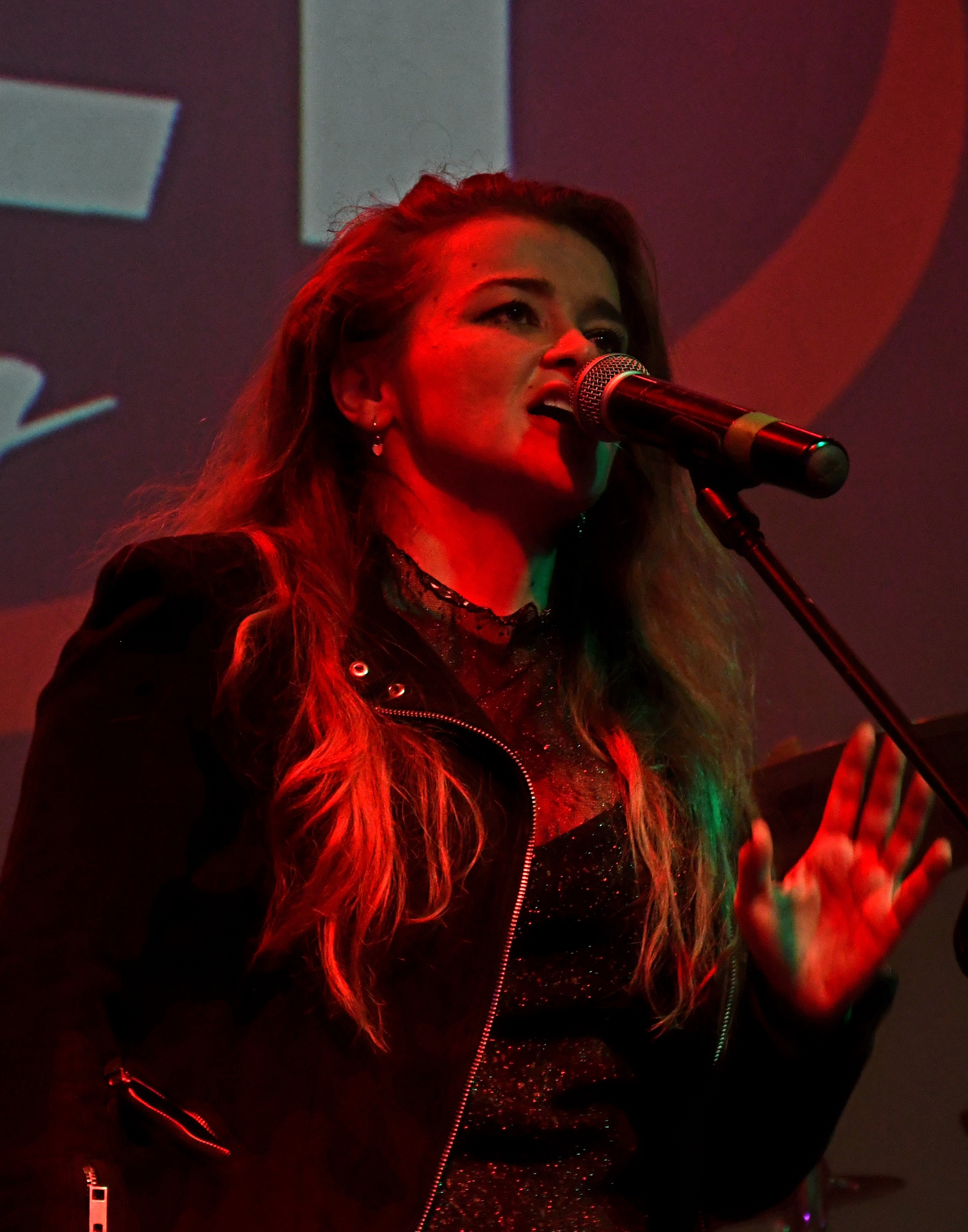

Background information
- Born: Grace Salazar Carreño; Duitama, Colombia
- Genres: Pop, rock, alternative
- Occupations: Singer, songwriter
- Instruments: Voice, guitar
- Years active: 2020–present
- Labels: See Music; Independent
- Spouse: Rolf de Gier

Grace Salazar Carreño, better known as Grace de Gier, is a Colombian indie pop and alternative rock singer and songwriter. Born in Duitama and based in the Netherlands, she released her first studio album in 2020, titled Mágico, and has since recorded a few singles and Extended Plays. In December 2022 she was recognized as the best pop rock singer of the year at the Mara International Awards.

== Biography ==
=== Early years ===
The daughter of Jorge Salazar and Luding Carreño, Grace was born in the municipality of Duitama, Boyacá and settled in the Netherlands in the late 2000s. Inspired by rock and pop bands like The Killers, The Cranberries, The Cure, Roxette and Garbage, she decided to start a solo career framed in indie pop and alternative rock, while retaining some elements of traditional Colombian music.

=== Career ===
After recording a few singles, in September 2020 she released her first full-length album, entitled Mágico composed of ten songs. Her single "Llévame", which featured a video clip recorded during the COVID-19 pandemic, was recognized by the newspaper El País as one of the ten most outstanding songs for the year 2021. After releasing the single and video clip of "Ansiedad", in mid-2021 she released her first song in English, entitled "You Know", which managed to enter the charts in the Netherlands.

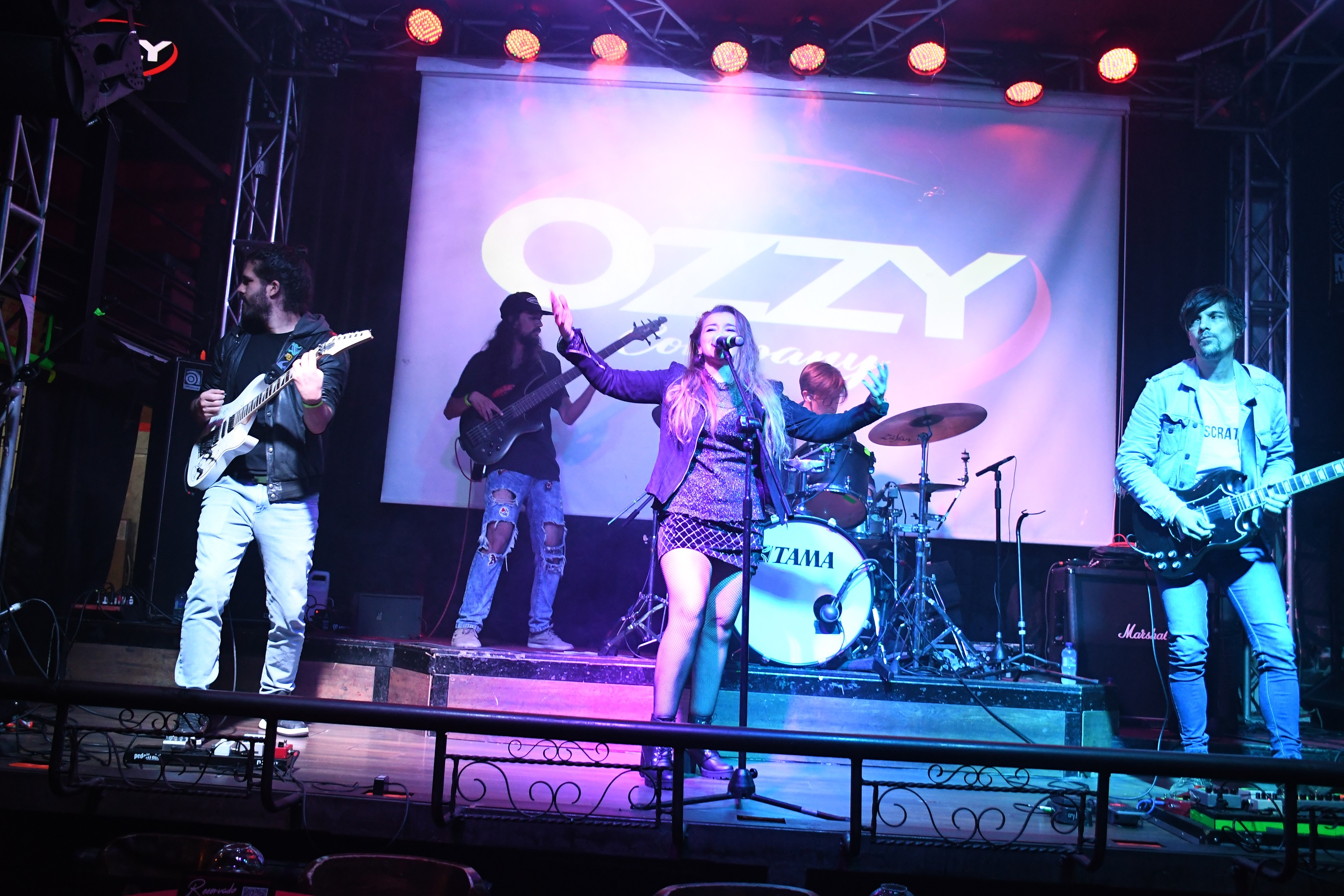
Grace de Gier and her band live in Bogotá, 2022.

In early 2022 she presented a three-song EP entitled "Tell Me", and in November she toured the city of Bogotá. "And Now", one of the songs included in the EP, reached the second position in a radio chart in England, and the single "Dime" was included in the Dutch Top 40 Tipparade. In December 2022 she was recognized at the Mara International Awards as the best pop rock singer of the year, in a ceremony held in the city of Medellín.

=== Present day ===
In March 2023, she released the single "Your Name", which, according to Rolling Stone magazine, is a preview of a new EP to be released that same year. Drummer Alejandro Duque, known for his work with bands like Aterciopelados and Bajo Tierra, participated in the recording of the song.

== Personal life ==
The singer is married to Rolf de Gier, has two children and currently resides in the city of Heerhugowaard. Her siblings Andrés ("Tell Me"), ("And Now"), Ludyng ("Llévame") and Valentina ("And Now") have participated as actors in some of her videos. She composed the song "Dame Tu Mano" as a dedication to her youngest son, who suffered from a severe case of hydrops fetalis and managed to recover from the disease.

== Style and influences ==
According to Rolling Stone, her music is inspired by the music of the 1990s, and "the legacy of The Cranberries, Alanis Morissette or PJ Harvey can be perceived". According to the magazine, her debut album Mágico "showed her close to pop, but her most recent songs reveal an artist closer to alternative rock", and the artist herself has stated that bands like The Killers, The Cure, Garbage, The Cranberries and Roxette have been an important influence in her musical style, which has also incorporated elements of traditional Colombian music.

== Discography ==
=== Studio albums ===
Year	Title	Discography
2020	Mágico	See Music

=== Singles and EP ===
Year	Title	Notes
2020	"Dame Tu Mano" "Llévame" "Me Dueles Amar"	
2021	"You Know" "And Now" "Wrong Again" "Tell Me"	
2022	"Dime"	
2023	"Your Name" "Aún" "You Make Me Feel"	
2024	"Not A Fool"	
2025	"Done"	

== Awards and nominations ==
Year	Event	Category	Result
2022	Mara International Awards	Best pop rock singer of the year	Won
