= Miss Earth Colombia =

Annual beauty contest in Colombia

- Formation: 2001
- Type: Beauty pageant
- Headquarters: Bogotá
- Location: Colombia
- Members: Miss Earth
- Official language: Spanish
- President: Dr. Elías Tobón; Agencia Portfolio International
- Current titleholder: Isabella Bermúdez Nieto; Risaralda
- Website: Official website

Miss Earth Colombia (Spanish: Miss Tierra Colombia) is a title given to a woman who is selected to represent Colombia at Miss Earth, an annual international beauty pageant promoting environmental awareness.

The reigning Miss Earth Colombia is Isabella Bermúdez Nieto of Risaralda.

== Titleholders ==
The Miss Earth Colombia Organization used to appoint a Colombian woman to represent Colombia in Miss Earth. Starting 2014, a national competition was held. The first competition was won by María Alejandra Villafañe Osorio and the competition was held in Armenia, Colombia. On occasion, when the winner does not qualify (due to age) for either contest, a runner-up is sent.

Color key

- Declared as Winner
- Ended as runner-up
- Ended as one of the finalists or semifinalists
- Ended as special awards winner

Year	Miss Earth Colombia	Department	Placement at Miss Earth	Special awards
2001	Natalia Botero	Cesar	Unplaced	
2002	Diana Botero	Antioquia	Top 10	1 Special Award: Best in Swimsuit
2003	Emily de Castro	Bogotá	Unplaced	
2004	María Fernanda Navia	Bogotá	Unplaced	
2005	Lía Correal	Bolívar	Unplaced	
2006	Did not compete			
2007	Mileth Agámez	Sucre	Unplaced	
2008	Mariana Rodríguez	Valle del Cauca	Top 8	1 Special Award: Face of Night
2009	Alejandra Castillo	Bogotá	Top 8	2 Special Awards: Top 5 Best in Long Gown; Top 5 Best in Swimsuit
2010	Diana Marín	Valle del Cauca	Unplaced	
2011	Andrea DeVivo	La Guajira	Unplaced	1 Special Award: Miss Hannah Resort
2012	Cindy Kohn	La Guajira	Unplaced	1 Special Award: Miss Friendship (Group 1)
2013	Diana Ortegón	Cundinamarca	Unplaced	3 Special Awards: Top 15 Best in Swimsuit; Top 15 Best in Talent; Most Child Friendly (Group 1) (2nd Placed)
2014	Alejandra Villafañe †	Valle del Cauca	Top 16	1 Special Award: (gold) Swimsuit Competition
2015	Estefania Muñoz	Antioquia	Top 8	2 Special Awards: (silver) Long Gown; (gold) Swimsuit
2016	Michelle Gómez	Bogotá	Miss Earth – Air 2016	4 Special Awards: (bronze) Swimsuit (Group 2); Miss Boardwalk; Miss Boracay Body; Top 10 in Miss Earth Hannah
2017	Juliana Franco	Meta	Miss Earth – Water 2017	2 Special Awards: Miss Charmulets; (silver) Miss Photogenic
2018	Valeria Ayos	Bolívar	Miss Earth – Water 2018	2 Special Awards: (silver) Resorts Wear (Air Group); Top 10 Beauty of Figure & Form
2019	Yenny Carrillo	Cesar	Top 20	1 Special Award: Miss Samsung
2020	Natalia Romero	Valle del Cauca	Unplaced	
2021	Paulina Ruiz	Bogotá	Top 20	2 Special Awards: (bronze) Casual Chic Competition; (bronze) Talent (Singing) - Popular Vote
2022	Andrea Aguilera	Antioquia	Miss Earth – Fire 2022	8 Special Awards: (gold) Darling of the Press (Americas); Best Eco Video (Americas); Miss Photogenic (Fire Group); Best in Swim-Wear (Fire Group); (gold) Swimsuit Competition (Americas); (gold) Beach Wear Competition (Fire Group); (bronze) Long Gown Competition (Fire Group); Ms. Spotlight
2023	Luz Adriana López	Caquetá	Unplaced	
2024	María Alejandra Camargo	Santander	Unplaced	
2025	Valentina Collazos	Valle del Cauca	Unplaced	1 Special Award: Best in Swimsuit
2026	Isabella Bermúdez Nieto	Risaralda	TBA	TBA

† = deceased

== See also ==
- Miss Earth
- Miss Colombia
- Miss Mundo Colombia
- Miss Universe Colombia
- Miss Grand Colombia
