= Miss Earth 2022 =

22nd Miss Earth pageant

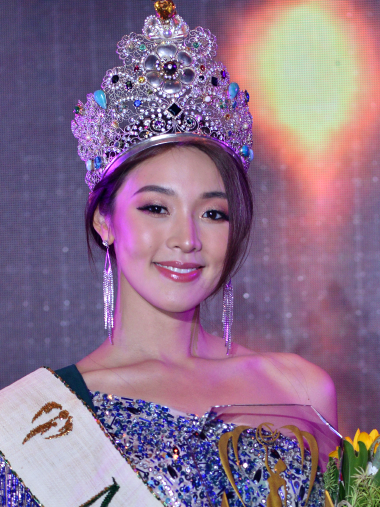
- Mina Sue Choi
- Date: November 29, 2022
- Presenters: James Deakin; Angelia Ong; Karen Ibasco; Nellys Pimentel
- Theme: ME Loves Fauna
- Venue: Okada Manila, Parañaque, Metro Manila, Philippines
- Broadcaster: Streaming: Kumu; Television: A2Z; All TV; Globovisión; MENT TV; TFC
- Entrants: 85
- Placements: 20
- Debuts: Burundi; Cape Verde; Senegal
- Withdrawals: Angola; Armenia; Bangladesh; Botswana; Cambodia; Crimea; Denmark; Gambia; Guadeloupe; Guatemala; Italy; Kenya; Latvia; Lebanon; Myanmar; Northern Mariana Islands; Paraguay; Rwanda; Sweden; Syria; Ukraine
- Returns: Albania; Croatia; Democratic Republic of the Congo; Ecuador; Ethiopia; Haiti; Hong Kong; Iraq; Kosovo; Malta; Mongolia; Namibia; Pakistan; Palestine; Poland; Romania; Scotland; Sierra Leone; Slovakia; South Korea; South Sudan; Wales; Zambia
- Winner: Mina Sue Choi; South Korea
- Congeniality: Sheridan Mortlock; Australia; Aizhan Chanacheva; Kyrgyzstan
- Photogenic: Dajana Šnjegota; Bosnia and Herzegovina; Andrea Aguilera; Colombia

Miss Earth 2022 was the 22nd edition of the Miss Earth pageant, held at the Okada Manila in Parañaque, Metro Manila, Philippines, on 29 November 2022. The competition returned to the Philippines into a standard format for the first time since 2019, after easing travel restrictions surrounding the COVID-19 pandemic.

At the end of the event, Destiny Wagner of Belize crowned Mina Sue Choi of South Korea as Miss Earth 2022. This is the first time South Korea won the Miss Earth pageant. Her elemental court are crowned In the same event: Sheridan Mortlock of Australia as Miss Earth-Air, Nadeen Ayoub of Palestine as Miss Earth-Water, and Andrea Aguilera of Colombia as Miss Earth-Fire.

Contestants from eighty-five countries and territories participated in this year's pageant. The pageant was hosted by James Deakin for the sixth consecutive time and anchored by Miss Earth 2015 Angelia Ong, Miss Earth 2017 Karen Ibasco and Miss Earth 2019 Nellys Pimentel.

== Background ==
=== Location and date ===
Okada Manila, the venue of Miss Earth 2022

Miss Earth 2022 official logo

On 19 August 2022, the Miss Earth Organization announced that the pageant will be held in a hybrid format after holding the competition as a virtual pageant for the past two years. The competition has virtual and on-ground activities held in different parts of the Philippines. Following the announcement regarding the holding of the first physical coronation night since the COVID-19 pandemic, the Miss Earth Organization announced on 8 October 2022 that the competition will be held at Okada Manila, Parañaque, Metro Manila on 29 November 2022.

The Swimsuit competition was held in Zamboanga City on 16 November and the grand coronation night on November 29, 2022, which were announced during the virtual competitions.

=== Selection of participants ===
Contestants from eighty-five countries and territories were selected to compete in the pageant. Fourteen of these delegates were appointees to their national titles after being a runner-up of their national pageant or being selected through a casting process, while four were selected to replace the original dethroned winner.

==== Replacements ====
Eunike Suwandi, Putri Bumi Indonesia 2021, was originally scheduled to represent Indonesia in the competition. However, Putri Bumi Indonesia lost the franchise to the Mahakarya Duta Pesona Indonesia Organization, who is now in charge of selecting a representative to Miss Earth. Karina Basrewan was appointed to represent Miss Earth through a closed-door selection process. Brielle Simmons, the second runner-up of Miss Earth USA 2022, was appointed to represent the United States after Natalia Salmon, lost the title for unknown reasons. Elizabeth Gasiba, Miss Earth Venezuela 2022, was replaced by Oriana Pablos, third runner-up of Miss Venezuela 2019, due to academic reasons. Chileshe Wakumelo, Miss Earth Zambia 2022, has already competed in some preliminary activities but withdrew due to undisclosed reasons. She was replaced by the first runner-up of Miss Earth Zambia 2019, Joyce Mwansa.

==== Debuts, returns, and withdrawals ====
This competition saw the debuts of Burundi, Cabo Verde, and Senegal, and the returns of Albania, Croatia, the Democratic Republic of the Congo, Ecuador, Ethiopia, Haiti, Hong Kong, Iraq, Kosovo, Malta, Mongolia, Namibia, Pakistan, Palestine, Poland, Romania, Scotland, Sierra Leone, Slovakia, South Korea, South Sudan, Wales, and Zambia. Hong Kong last competed in 2011, Albania in 2013, the Democratic Republic of the Congo, Kosovo, and Scotland in 2015, Iraq, Namibia, and Palestine in 2016, Ethiopia and Wales in 2017, Haiti, South Korea, Malta, Slovakia, and South Sudan in 2019, and the others in 2020.

Angola, Armenia, Bangladesh, Botswana, Cambodia, Crimea, Denmark, The Gambia, Guadeloupe, Guatemala, Italy, Kenya, Latvia, Lebanon, Myanmar, Paraguay, Rwanda, Sweden, Syria, and Ukraine withdrew. Soriyan Hang of Cambodia withdrew due to financial problems. Macarena Tomas of Paraguay withdrew since she exceeded the age limit.

== Results ==
=== Placements ===
Placement	Contestant
Miss Earth 2022	South Korea – Mina Sue Choi
Miss Earth – Air 2022	Australia – Sheridan Mortlock
Miss Earth – Water 2022	Palestine – Nadeen Ayoub
Miss Earth – Fire 2022	Colombia – Andrea Aguilera
Top 8	Belgium – Daphné Nivelles; Netherlands – Merel Hendriksen; Puerto Rico – Paulina Avilés; Zimbabwe – Sakhile Dube
Top 12	Brazil – Jéssica Pedroso; Cuba – Sheyla Ravelo; Nigeria – Esther Ajayi; Portugal – Maria Rosado
Top 20	Czech Republic – Anežka Heralecká; Ethiopia – Hiwot Kassa; Ireland – Alannah Larkin; Namibia – Diana Andimba; Norway – Lilly Sødal; Philippines – Jenny Ramp; Slovenia – Lea Prstec; Vietnam – Thạch Thu Thảo

=== Special awards ===
Awards	Continental Group			
Awards	Africa	Americas	Asia & Oceania	Europe
Best Eco Video	Diana Andimba; Namibia	Andrea Aguilera; Colombia	Sareesha Shrestha; Nepal	Alannah Larkin; Ireland
Best Fauna Outfit	Esther Ajayi; Nigeria	Brielle Simmons; United States	Jenny Ramp; Philippines	Liliya Levaya; Belarus
Best National Costume	Esther Ajayi; Nigeria	Indira Pérez; Mexico	Karina Basrewan; Indonesia	Liliya Levaya; Belarus

==== Other awards ====
Awards	Elemental Group				Ref.
Awards	Air	Eco	Fire	Water	Ref.
Miss Congeniality			Sheridan Mortlock; Australia	Aizhan Chanacheva; Kyrgyzstan	
Miss Photogenic			Andrea Aguilera; Colombia	Dajana Šnjegota; Bosnia and Herzegovina	
Best in Swim-Wear			Andrea Aguilera; Colombia		
Miss Isla de Romblon 2022			Sheyla Ravelo; Cuba		
Miss Pontefino Estate 2022			Daphné Nivelles; Belgium		
Miss Pontefino Hotel 2022			Jessica Cianchino; Canada		
Miss Flavor Cartel 2022	Paulina Avilés; Puerto Rico				
Miss Lakeshore 2022	Jenny Ramp; Philippines				
Miss Mexico Pampanga 2022	Mina Sue Choi; South Korea				
Best in Cocktail Dress				Sakhile Dube; Zimbabwe	
Best in Creative Dress				Thaïs Pausé; Réunion	
Miss Brookes' Point 2022				Jéssica Pedroso; Brazil	

== Pre-pageant activities ==
=== Virtual pre-pageant activities ===
Miss Earth's virtual pre-pageant activities premiered on Miss Earth's official YouTube channel on 25 October 2022 with the Meet the delegates series. Six competitions took place: Fauna outfit competition, Intelligence preliminary judging, National costume competition, Beauty of Face, Fitness & Form, and the Eco Video presentations.

Delegates were divided into four regions; Asia & Oceania, Europe, Africa and the Americas for Intelligence preliminary judging between November 1 and 4, 2022. For the first time, the Fauna outfit competition was held, which displayed the delegates' creative outfits of the fauna they represent. The grand showcase of the delegates' culture and traditions in the National Costume competition premiered on 6 November 2022. Other preliminary rounds include Miss Earth 2022 Beauty of Face competition and the Miss Earth 2022 Fitness & Form. The Miss Earth 2022 Eco Video presentation divided the delegates via the continental group between November 11 and 14.

=== Press Presentation ===
86 delegates were introduced during the Miss Earth 2022 press presentation, held at Okada Manila on November 14, 2022.

Award	Continental Group			
Award	Africa	Americas	Asia & Oceania	Europe
Darling of the Press	Esther Ajayi; Nigeria	Andrea Aguilera; Colombia	Sheridan Mortlock; Australia	Merel Hendriksen; Netherlands

=== Swimsuit Competition ===
The swimsuit competition was held at the Azzura Beach Resort in Zamboanga City on November 16, 2022. The competition was won by Esther Ajayi of Nigeria for Africa, Andrea Aguilera of Colombia for the Americas, Mina Sue Choi of South Korea for Asia & Oceania, and Liliya Levaya of Belarus for Europe.

Event		Continental Group				Ref.
Event		Africa	Americas	Asia & Oceania	Europe	Ref.
Swimsuit Competition	Gold	Esther Ajayi; Nigeria	Andrea Aguilera; Colombia	Mina Sue Choi; South Korea	Liliya Levaya; Belarus	
Swimsuit Competition	Silver	Sakhile Dube; Zimbabwe	Sheyla Ravelo; Cuba	Sheridan Mortlock; Australia	Ekaterina Velmakina; Russia	
Swimsuit Competition	Bronze	Abuana Nkumu; Democratic Republic of the Congo	Daniela Riquelme; Chile	Jenny Ramp; Philippines	Alannah Larkin; Ireland	

=== Beach Wear Competition ===
The Beach Wear Competition was held in various places in the Philippines from November 18 to 19, 2022. The competition was won by Mina Sue Choi of South Korea, Daniela Riquelme of Chile, Andrea Aguilera of Colombia, and Jessica Pedroso of Brazil.

Event		Elemental Group				Ref.
Event		Air	Eco	Fire	Water	Ref.
Beach Wear Competition	Gold	Mina Sue Choi; South Korea	Daniela Riquelme; Chile	Andrea Aguilera; Colombia	Jessica Pedroso; Brazil	
Beach Wear Competition	Silver	Julia Baryga; Poland	Maria Rosado; Portugal	Sheyla Ravelo; Cuba	Merel Hendriksen; Netherlands	
Beach Wear Competition	Bronze	Oriana Pablos; Venezuela	Chawanphat Kongnim; Thailand	Sheridan Mortlock; Australia	Brielle Simmons; United States	

=== Long Gown Competition ===
Event		Elemental Group				Ref.
Event		Air	Eco	Fire	Water	Ref.
Best in Long Gown	Gold	Mina Sue Choi; South Korea	Daniela Riquelme; Chile	Sheyla Ravelo; Cuba	Susan Toledo; Ecuador	
Best in Long Gown	Silver	Paulina Avilés; Puerto Rico	Maria Rosado; Portugal	Gianella Paz; Peru	Aya Kohen; Spain	
Best in Long Gown	Bronze	Jenny Ramp; Philippines	Paul Anne Estima; Haiti	Andrea Aguilera; Colombia	Brielle Simmons; United States	

=== Resort Wear Competition ===
Event		Elemental Group				Ref.
Event		Air	Eco	Fire	Water	Ref.
Best in Resort Wear	Gold	Oriana Pablos; Venezuela				
Best in Resort Wear	Silver	Paulina Avilés; Puerto Rico				
Best in Resort Wear	Bronze	Mina Sue Choi; South Korea				

=== Talent Competition ===
Event		Elemental Group				Ref.
Event		Air	Eco	Fire	Water	Ref.
Best in Talent	Gold	Ekaterina Velmakina; Russia	Esther Ajayi; Nigeria	Sheyla Ravelo; Cuba	Alannah Larkin; Ireland	
Best in Talent	Silver	Simran Madan; New Zealand	Nandin Sergelen; Mongolia	Valerie Solis; Panama	Sakhile Dube; Zimbabwe	
Best in Talent	Bronze	Katharina Prager; Austria	Maria Rosado; Portugal	Alison Carrasco; France	Lea Prstec; Slovenia	

== Judges ==
- Theresa Mundita Lim – Executive Director of ASEAN Centre for Biodiversity
- Daphne Oseña-Paez – TV Host & Presenter, Host
- Abhisek Gupta – Managing Director of Mindshare Philippines
- Thuy Bui – Senior Country Officer International Finance Cooperation World Bank Group
- Roel Refran – CEO of Philippine Stock Exchange
- Lorraine Schuck – Founder and Executive Vice President of Miss Earth Organization

== Contestants ==
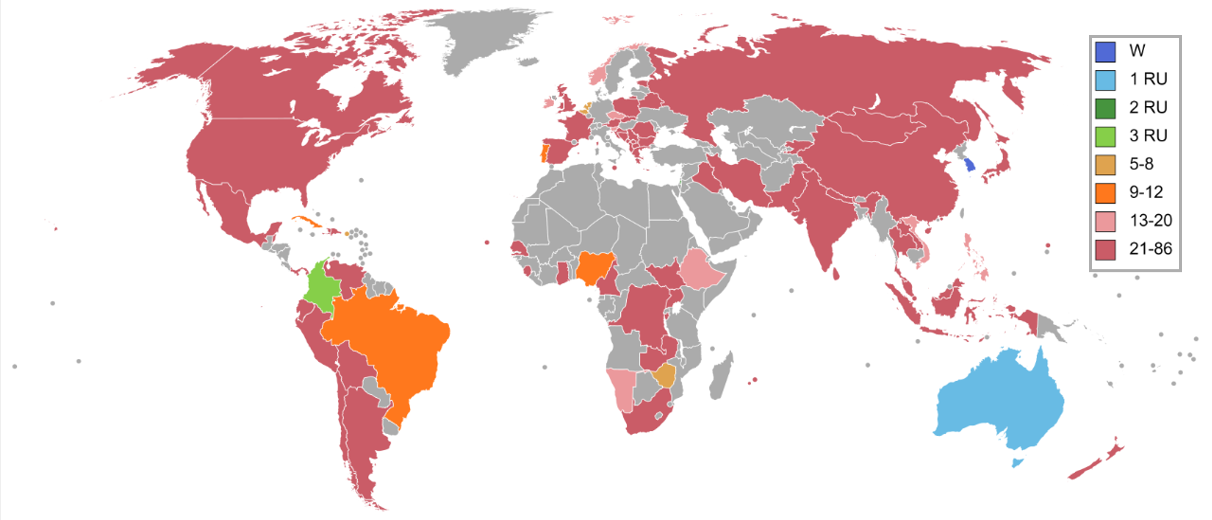
Miss Earth 2022 participating countries and territories.

Eighty-five contestants competed for the title.

Country/Territory	Contestant	Age (Note: Ages at the time of the pageant)	Hometown	Continental Group	Elemental Group
Albania	Rigelsa Cybi	25	Tirana	Europe	Water
Argentina	Sofía Martinoli	23	Berisso	Americas	Air
Australia	Sheridan Mortlock	22	Paddington	Asia & Oceania	Fire
Austria	Katharina Prager	19	Weitra	Europe	Air
Belarus	Liliya Levaya	25	Minsk	Europe	Eco
Belgium	Daphné Nivelles	22	Sint-Truiden	Europe	Fire
Belize	Simone Sleeuw	24	Caye Caulker	Americas	Air
Bolivia	Fabiane Valdivia	23	Santa Cruz de la Sierra	Americas	Eco
Bosnia and Herzegovina	Dajana Šnjegota	19	Srbac	Europe	Water
Brazil	Jéssica Pedroso	23	Piracicaba	Americas	Water
Bulgaria	Anjelina Nateva	26	Sofia	Europe	Fire
Burundi	Lauria Nishimwe	21	Bujumbura	Africa	Air
(Cape Verde) Cabo Verde	Tayrine da Veiga	24	Tarrafal	Africa	Water
Cameroon	Prandy Noella	22	Douala	Africa	Fire
Canada	Jessica Cianchino	23	Markham	Americas	Fire
Chile	Daniela Riquelme	22	Los Ángeles	Americas	Eco
China	Wang Shiqi	21	Shanghai	Asia & Oceania	Water
Colombia	Andrea Aguilera	25	Medellín	Americas	Fire
Croatia	Patricia Hanžek	20	Osijek	Europe	Fire
Cuba	Sheyla Ravelo	22	San Antonio de los Baños	Americas	Fire
Czech Republic	Anežka Heralecká	20	Jihlava	Europe	Fire
Democratic Republic of the Congo	Abuana Nkumu	28	Kinshasa	Africa	Eco
Dominican Republic	Nieves Marcano	26	María Trinidad Sánchez	Americas	Water
Ecuador	Susan Toledo	22	Santa Elena	Americas	Water
England	Beth Rice	27	Suffolk	Europe	Air
Estonia	Liisi Tammoja	20	Pärnu	Europe	Air
Ethiopia	Hiwot Kassa	23	Addis Ababa	Africa	Fire
France	Alison Carrasco	26	Toulouse	Europe	Fire
Ghana	Eunice Nkeyasen	23	Nkwanta	Africa	Fire
Greece	Georgia Nastou	25	Athens	Europe	Fire
Haiti	Paul Anne Estima	21	Port-au-Prince	Americas	Eco
Hong Kong	Alison Cheung	28	Yau Tsim Mong	Asia & Oceania	Fire
India	Vanshika Parmar	18	Shimla	Asia & Oceania	Eco
Indonesia	Karina Basrewan	26	Jakarta	Asia & Oceania	Fire
Iran	Mahrou Ahmadi	23	Tehran	Asia & Oceania	Air
Iraq	Jihan Majid	20	Wasit	Asia & Oceania	Eco
(Republic of Ireland) Ireland	Alannah Larkin	18	Eyrecourt	Europe	Water
Japan	Manae Matsumoto	25	Saitama	Asia & Oceania	Fire
Kosovo	Vonesa Alijaj	25	Gjakovë	Europe	Eco
Kyrgyzstan	Aizhan Chanacheva	23	Naryn	Asia & Oceania	Water
Laos	Jintana Khidaphone	24	Vientiane	Asia & Oceania	Air
Malaysia	Kajel Kaur	27	Ipoh	Asia & Oceania	Water
Malta	Kim Pelham	25	St. Julian's	Europe	Water
Mauritius	Jodie Pyndiah	23	Mahébourg	Africa	Fire
Mexico	Indira Pérez	23	Veracruz	Americas	Eco
Mongolia	Nandin Sergelen	18	Ulaanbaatar	Asia & Oceania	Eco
Montenegro	Anđela Drašković	22	Podgorica	Europe	Eco
Namibia	Diana Andimba	23	Windhoek	Africa	Eco
Nepal	Sareesha Shrestha	26	Lalitpur	Asia & Oceania	Fire
Netherlands	Merel Hendriksen	24	Kesteren	Europe	Water
New Zealand	Simran Madan	21	Auckland	Asia & Oceania	Air
Nigeria	Esther Oluwatosin Ajayi	27	Ekiti	Africa	Eco
North Macedonia	Anđela Jakimovska	26	Skopje	Europe	Eco
Norway	Lilly Sødal	19	Kristiansand	Europe	Air
Pakistan	Anniqa Jamal Iqbal	21	Karachi	Asia & Oceania	Water
Palestine	Nadeen Ayoub	27	Ramallah	Asia & Oceania	Water
Panama	Valerie Solis	19	Panama City	Americas	Fire
Peru	Gianella Paz	23	Callao	Americas	Fire
Philippines	Jenny Ramp	19	Santa Ignacia	Asia & Oceania	Air
Poland	Julia Baryga	20	Łódź	Europe	Air
Portugal	Maria Rosado	21	Ourém	Europe	Eco
Puerto Rico	Paulina Avilés	23	Carolina	Americas	Air
Réunion	Thaïs Pausé	18	Saint-Denis	Africa	Water
Romania	Aura Dosoftei	27	Bucharest	Europe	Eco
Russia	Ekaterina Velmakina	19	Moscow	Europe	Air
Scotland	Marcie Reid	27	Glasgow	Europe	Eco
Senegal	Camilla Diagné	25	Dakar	Africa	Eco
Serbia	Milica Krstović	19	Belgrade	Europe	Air
Sierra Leone	Shalom John	28	Freetown	Africa	Air
Singapore	Charmaine Ng	24	Toa Payoh	Asia & Oceania	Fire
Slovakia	Karolína Michalčíková	23	Trenčín	Europe	Fire
Slovenia	Lea Prstec	21	Ptuj	Europe	Water
South Africa	Ziphozethu Sithebe	23	Durban	Africa	Air
South Korea	Mina Sue Choi	23	Incheon	Asia & Oceania	Air
South Sudan	Melang Kuol	22	Abyei	Africa	Air
Spain	Aya Kohen	21	Seville	Europe	Water
Sri Lanka	Udani Senanayake	21	Colombo	Asia & Oceania	Fire
Thailand	Chawanphat Kongnim	26	Lopburi	Asia & Oceania	Eco
Uganda	Caroline Ngabire	25	Kyambogo	Africa	Eco
United States	Brielle Simmons	21	Fort Washington	Americas	Water
Venezuela	Oriana Pablos	25	Caracas	Americas	Air
Vietnam	Thạch Thu Thảo	22	Trà Vinh	Asia & Oceania	Water
Wales	Shereen Brogan	24	Cardiff	Europe	Fire
Zambia	Joyce Mwansa	26	Lusaka	Africa	Air
Zimbabwe	Sakhile Dube	25	Harare	Africa	Water
