= Luis Amigó Catholic University =

Private Catholic university in Medellín, Colombia

Coordinates: 6.2594°N 75.5837°W

- Universidad Católica Luis Amigó
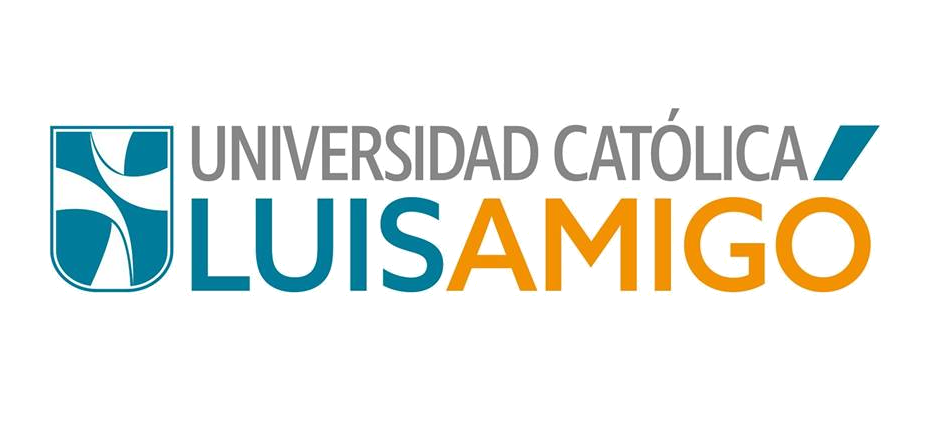
- Type: Private
- Established: 9 November 1984
- Rector: Carlos Enrique Cardona Quiceno
- Students: 17,000 approx.
- Location: Transversal 51 A # 67 B–90, Medellín, Colombia
- Colors: Teal, orange, and grey
- Website: www.funlam.edu.co

Luis Amigó Catholic University (Spanish: Universidad Católica Luis Amigó) is a private Catholic university located in Medellín, the second-largest city of Colombia. The university also has offices in Apartadó, Bogotá, Cali, Manizales, and Montería.
