= Choi Mina Sue =

South Korean beauty pageant titleholder (born 1999)

- 최미나수
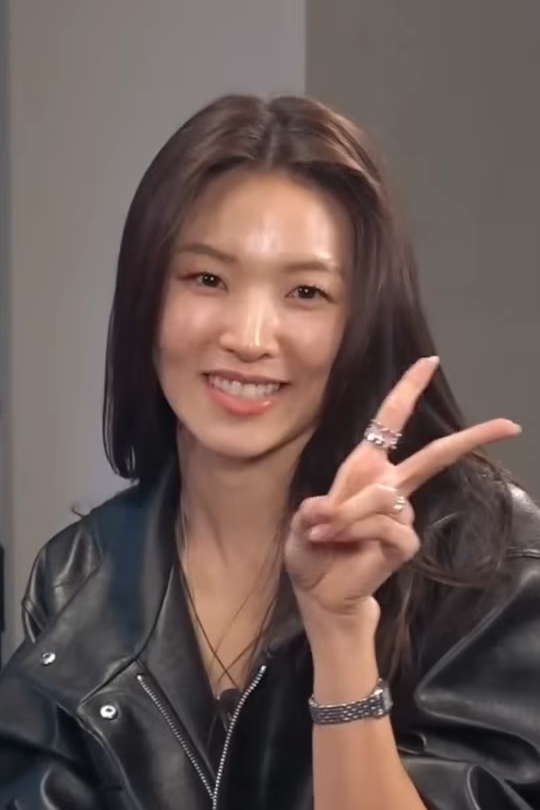
- Choi in 2026
- Born: February 22, 1999 (age 27); Sydney, New South Wales, Australia
- Education: University of Illinois Urbana-Champaign, (BA)
- Agent: Chorokbaem Entertainment
- Height: 1.72 m (5 ft 8 in)
- Beauty pageant titleholder
- Title: Miss Gyeonggi Incheon 2021; Miss Earth 2022
- Major competitions: Miss Korea 2021; (1st Runner-Up); Miss Earth 2022; (Winner)

Korean name
- Hangul: 최미나수
- Hanja: 崔美娜秀
- RR: Choe Minasu
- MR: Ch'oe Minasu

Choi Mina Sue (Korean: 최미나수; born February 22, 1999) is a South Korean beauty pageant titleholder who was crowned Miss Earth 2022. She is the first Korean to win Miss Earth, making her the first Korean to win one of the Big Four beauty pageants.

== Early life and education ==
Choi Mina Sue was born in Sydney, on February 22, 1999 and lived there until she was seven years old. Growing up, she lived in South Korea, Canada, the United States, and China. Choi attended the University of Illinois Urbana-Champaign, where she majored in communication studies.

== Pageantry ==
=== Miss Korea 2021 ===
On October 15, Choi won Miss Gyeonggi Incheon 2021, a Miss Korea regional preliminary. She participated in Miss Korea 2021 on November 16 and finished 1st runner-up.

=== Miss Earth 2022 ===
Choi won Miss Earth 2022, on November 29, 2022, representing South Korea. During the preliminary events, she won the swimsuit competition (Asia & Oceania), beach wear competition (Air Group), and long gown competition (Air Group). Choi was the first Korean to win the Miss Earth title and one of the Big Four international beauty pageants.

Choi served as a judge for the 2024 finale of the pageant.

== Advocacy and environmental work ==
During her reign as Miss Earth 2022, Choi promoted environmental protection, sustainability, and wildlife conservation, with a focus on marine ecosystems and plastic pollution. Her advocacy emphasized the importance of protecting natural habitats and raising awareness about the impacts of human activity on the environment.

At the Miss Earth 2022 competition, Choi presented a fauna-themed performance highlighting the effects of plastic pollution on marine animals, particularly dolphins and other sea creatures. The performance aimed to educate audiences about the environmental threats facing marine biodiversity and the need to reduce ocean waste. In July 2023, Choi visited the DUYTAN Plastic Recycling Factory in Vietnam to learn about plastic waste collection and recycling practices and to participate in activities aimed at reducing greenhouse gas emissions and promoting sustainable development.

After her Reign, Choi collaborated on a documentary project with Bloomberg and Kia Worldwide about blue carbon ecosystems, focusing on coastal habitats such as mangroves and seagrasses and their role in carbon sequestration and climate change mitigation.

Choi has also engaged in humanitarian initiatives for children in Southeast Asia. During a visit to Vietnam, she participated in programs supporting pediatric patients by donating medical supplies and medicines and spending time with children undergoing treatment, highlighting her commitment to social responsibility alongside environmental advocacy.

In addition, Choi has contributed to global health and environmental discussions by serving as a panel speaker at events organized by the World Health Organization. In this capacity, she shared insights on the intersection of environmental conservation, human health, and sustainable development, further promoting awareness of the links between environmental protection and public well-being.

Choi participated in educational campaigns, community outreach programs, and sustainability initiatives. Her messaging consistently emphasized the interconnectedness between human activity, wildlife conservation, and the preservation of natural ecosystems.

== Entertainment career ==
Following her win at Miss Earth, Choi entered the South Korean entertainment industry under the management of Global E&B. In 2022, she made her television debut as a contestant on the survival game show Battle for Tenancy: Penthouse, where she finished in seventh place. She later made a cameo appearance in the television drama DNA Lover (2024).

In 2025, Choi signed an exclusive management contract with Chorokbaem Entertainment.

In January 2026, Choi joined the cast of the reality dating program Single's Inferno (season 5). During the program, she described her approach to relationships in interviews conducted on the show, which became a focal point of viewer discussion. She received attention from several male contestants during the early episodes. After the first four episodes aired, Choi received a large volume of negative responses online, which led her to disable comments on her Instagram account. On 27 January 2026, her friend, Miss International 2022 Jasmin Selberg, publicly spoke in her defense. Selberg stated that Choi’s on-screen behavior reflected a role shaped by the program’s production and editing and emphasized a distinction between Choi's television persona and her personal character.

== Filmography ==
=== Television ===
Year	Title	Network	Role	Notes	Ref.
2022	Battle for Tenancy: Penthouse	Channel A	Contestant	Ranked as 7th place	
2024	DNA Lover	TV Chosun	Se-ra (special appearance)	Episode 12	
2025	Law and the City	tvN	Lee Jung-min (special appearance)	Episode 1	
2025	Melo Movie	Netflix	Ye-bin (special appeanavrance)	Episode 2	
2026	Single's Inferno	Netflix	Contestant	Season 5	
2026	Screwballs (Note: Screwballs is the successor program to the KBS 2TV variety show Beat Coin (2022-2024).)	Netflix	Guest	Season 4, Episode 5	
2026	Kill It: Style Creator Showdown	tvN	Contestant	Ranked as 4th place	

== Awards and nominations ==
Name of the award ceremony, year presented, category, nominee of the award, and the result of the nomination
Award ceremony	Year	Category	Nominee / Work	Result	Ref.
Blue Dragon Series Awards	2026	Best New Female Entertainer	Singles Inferno – Season 5	Nominated	
Global OTT Awards	2026	Rising Star of the Year	Singles Inferno – Season 5	Won	

== Notes ==
Awards and achievements
Preceded by (Belize) Destiny Wagner	Miss Earth; 2022	Succeeded by (Albania) Drita Ziri
Preceded by Woo Hee-jun	Miss Earth Korea; 2022	Succeeded by Jang Da-yeon
