= Valeria Ayos =

Colombian beauty pageant titleholder

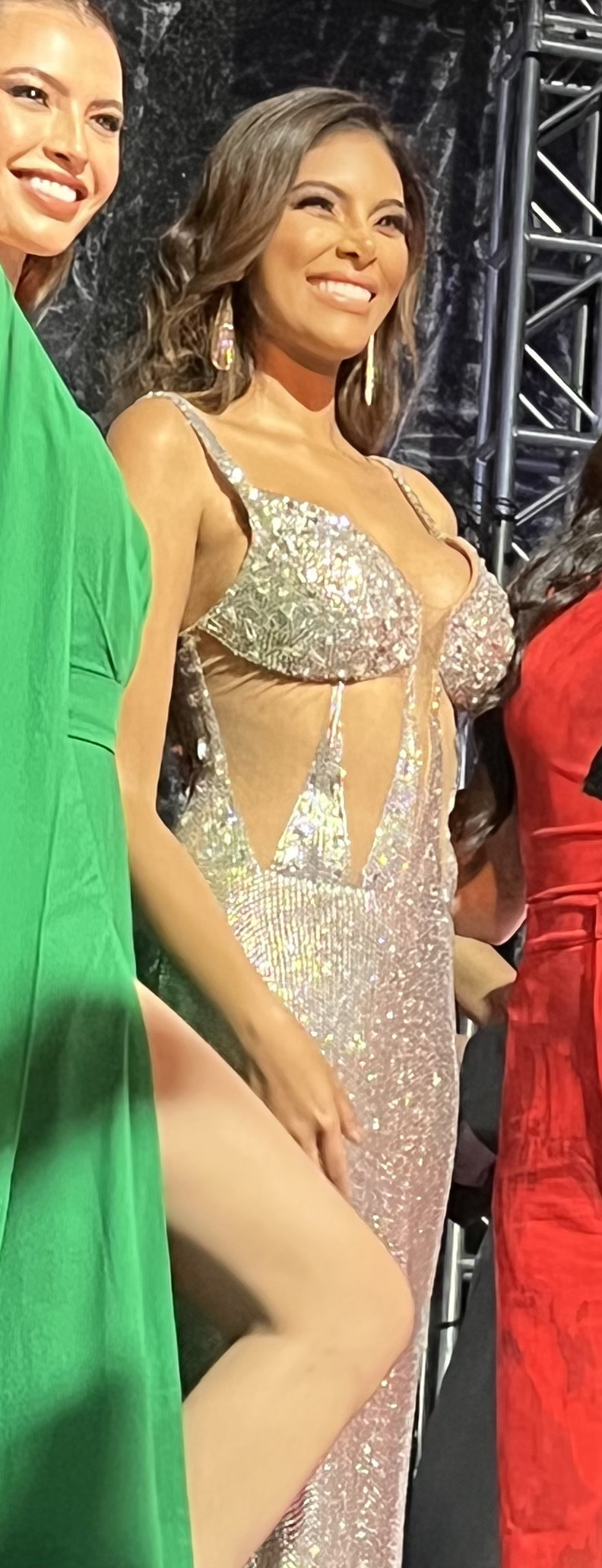
- Valeria Ayos at the Miss Universe Colombia 2022 event
- Born: Valeria Maria Ayos Bossa; Cartagena, Bolívar, Colombia
- Education: Jorge Tadeo Lozano University
- Height: 1.76 m (5 ft 9 in)
- Spouse: Cristhian Lerma Beltrán (m. 2023)
- Beauty pageant titleholder
- Title: Miss Earth Colombia 2018; Miss Earth–Water 2018; Miss Universe Cartagena 2021; Miss Universe Colombia 2021
- Hair color: Brown
- Eye color: Brown
- Major competitions: Miss Earth Colombia 2018; (Winner); Miss Earth 2018; (Miss Earth–Water); Miss Universe Colombia 2021; (Winner); Miss Universe 2021; (Top 5)

Valeria María Ayos Bossa (born 20 March 1994) is a Colombian beauty pageant titleholder who was crowned Miss Universe Colombia 2021. She represented Colombia at Miss Universe 2021 in Israel where she finished as a Top 5 finalist.

== Early life and education ==
Ayos completed her elementary education in San Andrés Island and her high school education at Instituto Alberto Merani in Bogotá. She earned her bachelor's degree in international relations from the Jorge Tadeo Lozano University in Bogotá, Colombia.

== Pageantry ==
=== Miss Earth Colombia 2018 ===
On 23 August 2018, Ayos won Miss Earth Colombia 2018, held in General Saulo Gil Ramirez Sendoya Auditorium in Bogotá succeeding Juliana Franco.

=== Miss Earth 2018 ===
Ayos represented Colombia at the Miss Earth 2018 pageant which was held at MOA Arena, Bay City, Pasay, Metro Manila, the Philippines and finished as Miss Earth - Water 2018.

=== Miss Universe Colombia 2020 ===
Ayos was an official candidate for Miss Universe Colombia 2020, but withdrew after suffering from partial face paralysis.

=== Miss Universe Colombia 2021 ===
Ayos won Miss Universe Colombia 2021 representing Cartagena, succeeding Laura Olascuaga of Bolívar.

=== Miss Universe 2021 ===
Ayos represented her country at Miss Universe 2021, held on 13 December 2021 at the Universe Dome in Eilat, Israel. She finished as a top five finalist.

== Personal life ==
Ayos married her boyfriend of 12 years, Cristhian Lerma Beltrán on 28 January 2023 at Iglesia de San Pedro Claver, Cartagena de Indias.

Awards and achievements
Preceded by (India) Adline Castelino (3rd Runner-Up) (Dominican Republic) Kimberly Jiménez (4th Runner-Up)	Miss Universe Top 5 Finalist (with (Philippines) Beatrice Gomez); 2021	Succeeded by (Curaçao) Gabriëla Dos Santos (Puerto Rico) Ashley Cariño (Top 5)
Preceded by Laura Olascuaga, Bolívar	Miss Universe Colombia; 2021	Succeeded by María Fernanda Aristizábal, Quindío
Preceded by (Colombia) Juliana Franco	Miss Earth – Water; 2018	Succeeded by (Czech Republic) Klára Vavrušková
Preceded by Juliana Franco, Meta	Miss Earth Colombia; 2018	Succeeded by Yenny Carrillo, Cesar
