= Miss Universe Colombia 2025 =

6th Miss Universe Colombia pageant

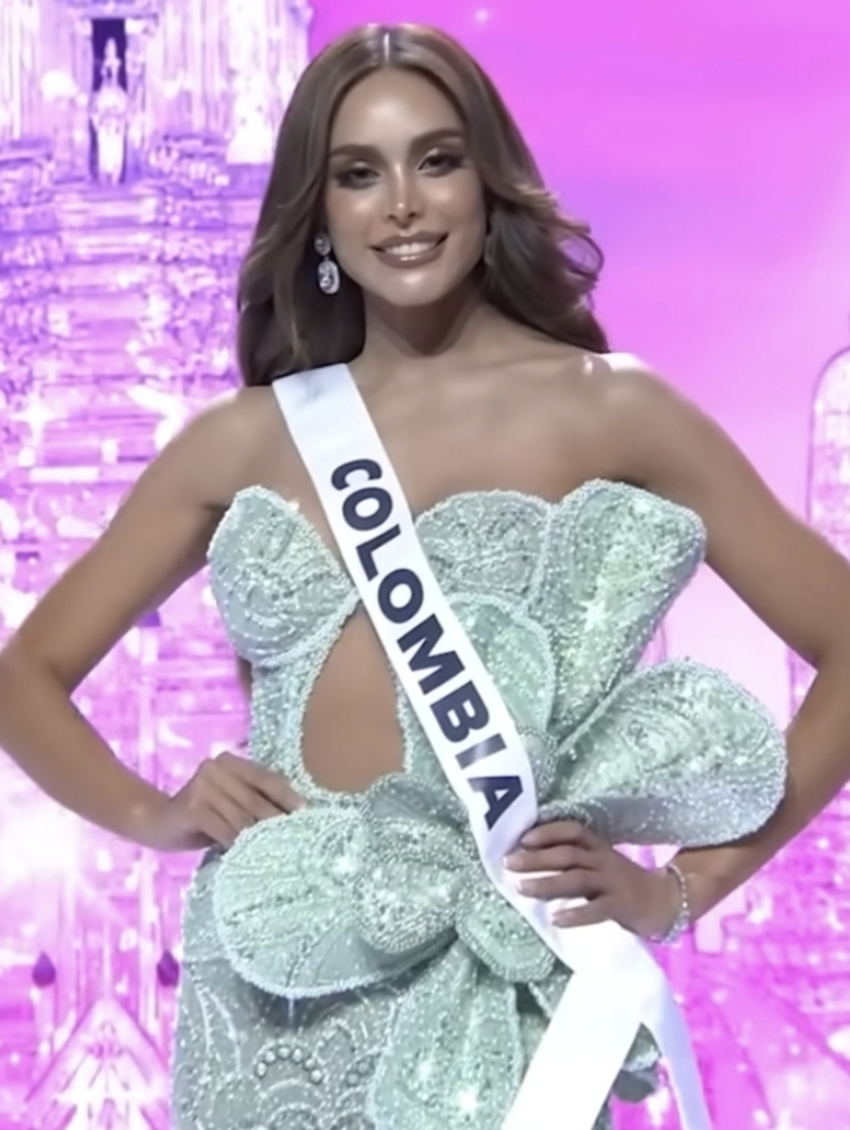
- Vanessa Pulgarin
- Date: September 28, 2025
- Presenters: Claudia Bahamón; Carlos Marín; Dominica Duque
- Venue: RCN Televisión studios, Bogotá, Colombia
- Broadcaster: RCN Televisión
- Entrants: 28 (Note: Retired: Miss Amazonas: Rebeca Alejandra Castillo Cruz.)
- Placements: 16
- Withdrawals: Amazonas; Región Andina; Barranquilla; Buenaventura; Cali; Cartagena; Medellín; Soledad; Tumaco
- Returns: Boyacá Department; La Guajira; Norte de Santander; Putumayo; Sucre
- Winner: Vanessa Pulgarin; Antioquia

Miss Universe Colombia 2025 was the sixth Miss Universe Colombia pageant, held at the studios of RCN channel in Bogotá DC, Colombia, on September 28, 2025.

Daniela Toloza of Valle del Cauca crowned Vanessa Pulgarín of Antioquia as her successor at the end of the event. Pulgarín represented Colombia at the Miss Universe 2025 pageant in Pak Kret, Thailand and placed Top 12.

== Results ==
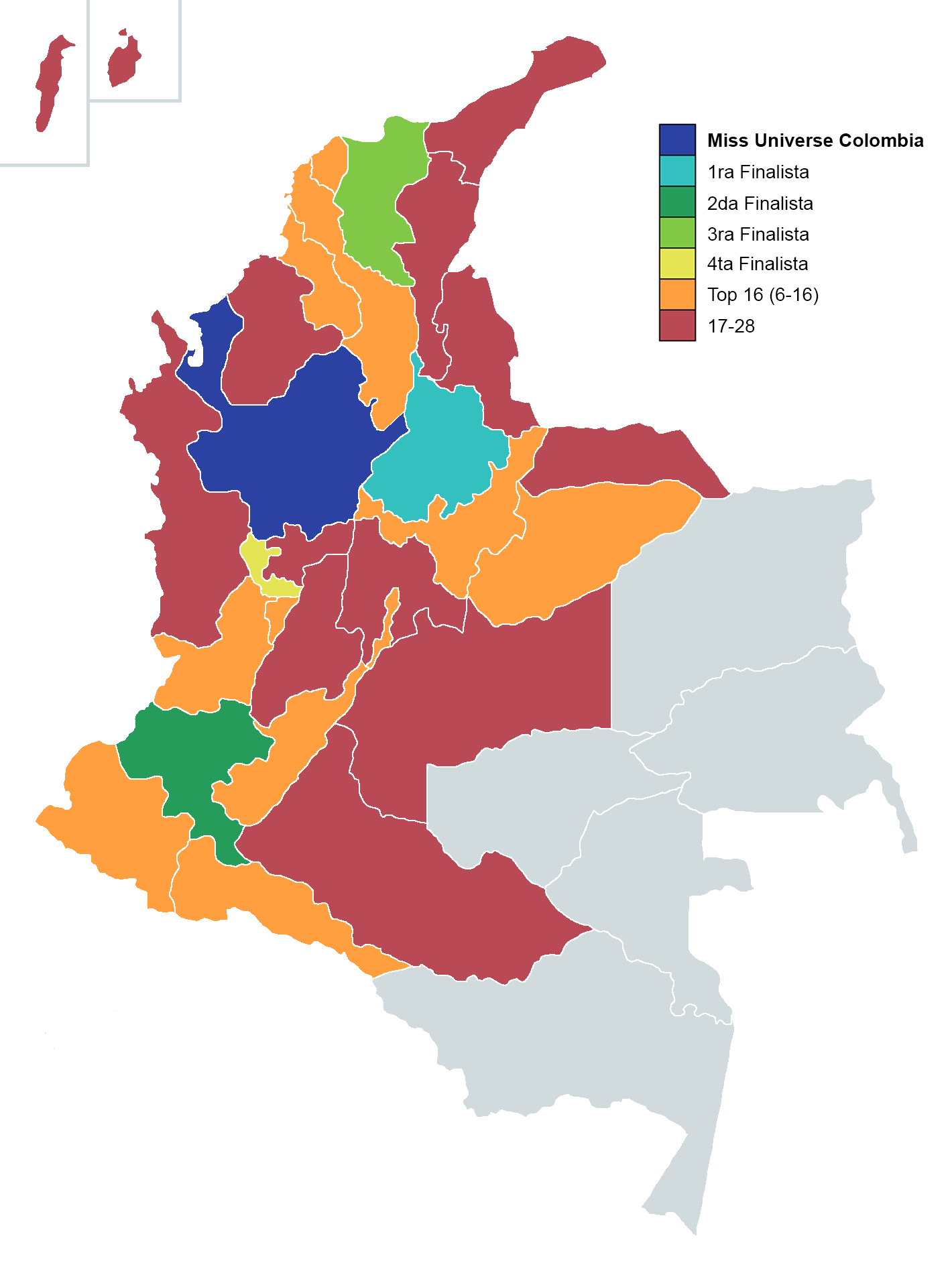
Official results

=== Placements ===
Placement	Contestant
Miss Universe Colombia 2025	Antioquia – Vanessa Pulgarín
1st Runner-Up	Santander – Gloria Mutis
2nd Runner-Up	Cauca – Marlyn Dinas
3rd Runner-Up	Magdalena – Sofia Donado
4th Runner-Up	Risaralda – Ángela Arcila
Top 16	Atlántico – Nayla Piña; Bogotá – Mariana Morales; Bolívar – Maria Clara Cortés; Boyacá – Ingrid Mabell Sánchez; Casanare – Dayana Ángulo; Huila – Adriana Lucia Risco; Nariño – Cavylla Valencia; Putumayo – Brenda Bedoya; Quindío – Michelle González; Sucre – Arianna Alfaro; Valle – Eliana Duque

== Format ==
For the first time, the pageant will be held in a docu-reality format, consisting of ten two-hour episodes, broadcast on RCN Televisión. This new approach seeks to show the training and selection process of the national representative to Miss Universe as part of a reality show, with an emphasis on leadership, communication, general culture and physical preparation. This reality show is hosted by renowned presenter Claudia Bahamón and has as judges Miss Colombia 2005 and actress Valerie Domínguez, Miss Colombia 2015 Andrea Tovar and designer Hernán Zajar.

== Contestants ==
28 contestants competed for the title.

City/Department	Contestant	Age (Note: Ages at the time of the pageant)	Height (m.)
Antioquia	Vanessa Pulgarin Monsalve	34	1.78
Arauca	Beatriz Adriana Hernández Jaimes	29	1.72
Atlántico	Nayla Piña Vélez	25	1.70
Bogotá	Mariana Morales Ospina	28	1.75
Bolívar	Maria Clara Cortés Correa	28	1.72
Boyacá	Ingrid Mabell Sánchez Carvajal	25	1.70
Caldas	Yennifer Loaiza Zamora	28	1.73
Caquetá	Cindy Catherine Vásquez Valbuena	30	1.58
Casanare	Jisbeth Dayana Ángulo Vega	26	1.73
Cauca	Marlyn Dinas Carabali	34	1.78
Cesar	Adriana Marcela Brand Leiva	23	1.88
Chocó	Yorladis Marcela Gutiérrez Cuesta	23	1.68
Córdoba	Lizeth Paola Cueter López	35	1.67
Cundinamarca	Isabela Cristina Córdoba Ramírez	39	1.74
La Guajira	Eilan Jusin Sosa Guerra	20	1.70
Huila	Adriana Lucia Risco López	27	1.75
Magdalena	Sofia Fernanda Donado Rojas	27	1.72
Meta	Ana María Tavera Lozano	33	1.70
Nariño	Cavylla Valencia Cuero	35	1.78
Norte de Santander	Natalia Bayona Carrillo	26	1.78
Putumayo	Brenda Brigitte Bedoya Bedoya	22	1.75
Quindío	Wendy Michel González Guerra	20	1.70
Risaralda	Ángela Viviana Arcila Agudelo	27	1.70
San Andrés y Providencia	Marvelis Yesel Watson Bello	27	1.68
Santander	Gloria Teresa Mutis Rincón	28	1.75
Sucre	Ariana Paola Pérez Alfaro	29	1.72
Tolima	Carolina Hernández	32	1.73
Valle del Cauca	Eliana Duque Salazar	27	1.76

== Judges ==
- Andrea Tovar — Miss Colombia 2015
- Valerie Domínguez — Miss Colombia 2005
- Hernán Zajar — Fashion Designer

== See also ==
- Miss Universe Colombia
- Miss Universe
- Miss Colombia
