= Miss Universe Colombia =

Colombian beauty pageant competition

Miss Universe Colombia Organization
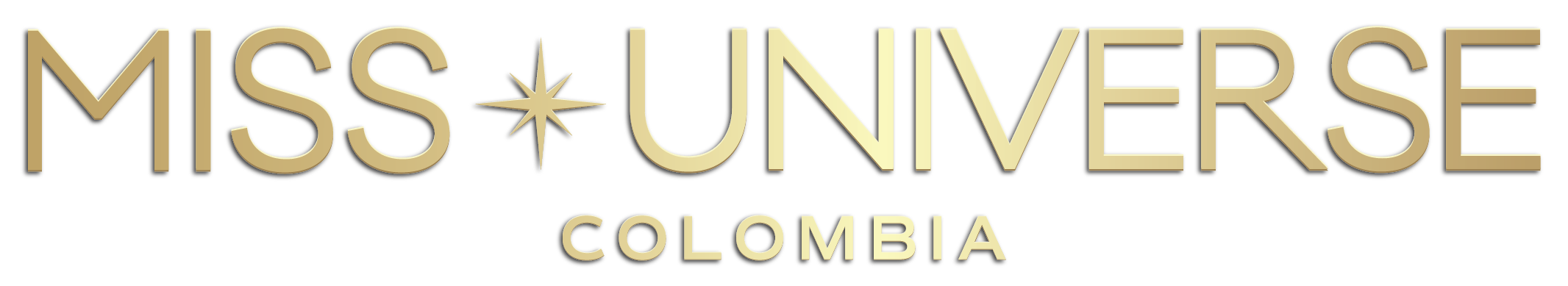
- Type: Women's beauty pageant
- Franchise holder: RCN Televisión S.A.
- Headquarters: Bogotá
- Country represented: Colombia
- Qualifies for: Miss Universe
- First edition: 2020 (Note: Held in 2021)
- Most recent edition: 2026
- Current titleholder: María Alejandra López; Risaralda
- Language: Spanish
- Predecessor: Miss Colombia
- Website: missuniversecolombia.org

Miss Universe Colombia is a national beauty pageant that selects Colombia's official representative to Miss Universe—one of the Big Four International beauty pageants.

The current Miss Universe Colombia is María Alejandra López of Risaralda who was crowned on October 10, 2026, in Barranquilla, Atlántico. She will represent Colombia at Miss Universe 2026 in Puerto Rico.

== Titleholders ==
The winner of Miss Universe Colombia represents her country at the Miss Universe. On occasion, when the winner does not qualify (due to age), a runner-up is sent.

Year	Miss Universe Colombia	Department	Ref.
2026	María Alejandra López	Risaralda	
2025	Vanessa Pulgarin	Antioquia	
2024	Daniela Toloza	Valle	
2023	Camila Avella	Casanare	
2022	María Fernanda Aristizábal	Quindío	
2021	Valeria Ayos	Cartagena	
2020	Laura Olascuaga	Bolívar	

== Titleholders under Miss Universe Colombia org. ==
=== Miss Universe Colombia 2020—Present ===
- : Declared as Winner
- : Ended as runner-up or top 5/6 qualification
- : Ended as one of the finalists or semifinalists
- : Ended as special awards winner

Year	Miss Universe Colombia	Placement at Miss Universe	Special Award(s)
2026	María Alejandra López Pérez	TBA	TBA
2025	Vanessa Pulgarin Monsalve	Top 12	
2024	Daniela Rebeca Toloza Rocha	Unplaced	
2023	María Camila Avella Montañez	Top 5	
2022	María Fernanda Aristizábal Urrea	Top 16	
2021	Valeria María Ayos Bossa	Top 5	
2020	Laura Victoria Olascuaga Pinto	Top 21	

=== Señorita Colombia 1958—2019 ===
The winner of Señorita Colombia represents her country at Miss Universe. On occasion, when the winner does not qualify (due to age) for either contest, a runner-up is sent. Since 2020, the election of Miss Universe Colombia has taken over the franchise of Miss Universe in Colombia.

Year	Señorita Colombia	Placement at Miss Universe	Special Award(s)
2019	Gabriela Tafur Náder	Top 5	
2018	Valeria Morales Delgado	Unplaced	
2017	Laura González Ospina	1st Runner-Up	
2016	Jealisse Andrea Tovar Velásquez	2nd Runner-Up	
2015	Ariadna María Gutiérrez Arévalo	1st Runner-Up	
2014	Paulina Vega Dieppa	Miss Universe 2014	
2013	Carmen Lucía Aldana Roldán	Unplaced	
2012	Daniella Margarita Álvarez Vásquez	Unplaced	
2011	Catalina Robayo Vargas	Top 16	
2010	Natalia Navarro Galvis	Top 15	
2009	Michelle Emilie Rouillard Estrada	Unplaced	
2008	Taliana María Vargas Carrillo	1st Runner-Up	Best National Costume (Top 10)
2007	Eileen Roca Torralvo	Unplaced	
2006	Valerie Domínguez Tarud	Top 10	
2005	Adriana Cecilia Tarud Durán	Unplaced	
2004	Catherine Daza Manchola	Top 10	
2003	Diana Lucia Mantilla Prada	Unplaced	
2002	Vanessa Alexandra Mendoza Bustos	Unplaced	Best National Costume
2001	Andrea María Nocetti Gómez	Unplaced	
2000	Catalina Inés Acosta Albarracín	Top 10	
1999	Marianella Maal Pacini	Unplaced	
1998	Silvia Fernanda Ortiz Guerra	Top 5	
1997	Claudia Elena Vásquez Ángel	Unplaced	Best National Costume
1996	Lina María Gaviria Forero	Unplaced	
1995	Tatiana Leonor Castro Abuchaibe	Top 10	
1994	Carolina Gomez Correa	1st Runner-Up	
1993	Paula Andrea Betancur Arroyave	1st Runner-Up	
1992	Paola Turbay Gómez	1st Runner-Up	
1991	Maribel Judith Gutiérrez Tinoco	Unplaced	Best National Costume
1990	Lizeth Yamile Mahecha Arévalo	2nd Runner-Up	Best National Costume
1989	María Teresa Egurrola Hinojosa	Unplaced	
1988	Diana Patricia Arévalo Guerra	Top 10	
1987	María Patricia López Ruiz	Unplaced	Miss Photogenic
1986	Maria Mónica Urbina Pugliesse	2nd Runner-Up	
1985	Sandra Eugenia Borda Caldas	Unplaced	Best National Costume
1984	Susana Caldas Lemaitre	4th Runner-Up	
1983	Julie Pauline Sáenz Starnes	Unplaced	
1982	Nadya Santacruz Quintero	Unplaced	
1981	Ana Edilma "Eddy" Cano Puerta	Unplaced	
1980	María Patricia Arbeláez Peláez	Top 12	
1979	Ana Milena Parra Turbay	Unplaced	
1978	Mary Shirley Sáenz Starnes	3rd Runner-Up	
1977	Aura María Mojica Salcedo	3rd Runner-Up	
1976	María Helena Reyes Abisambra	Top 12	
1975	Marta Lucía Echeverri Trujillo	Top 12	Miss Photogenic
1974	Ella Cecilia Escandón Palacios	3rd Runner-Up	
1973	Ana Lucía Agudelo Correa	Top 12	
1972	María Luisa Lignarolo Martínez-Aparicio	Unplaced	
1971	Piedad Mejía Trujillo	Unplaced	
1970	María Luisa Riascos Velásquez	Unplaced	
1969	Margarita Maria Reyes Zawadsky	Top 15	Best in Swimsuit
1968	Luz Elena Restrepo González	Unplaced	Best National Costume
1967	Elsa María Garrido Cajiao	Unplaced	
1966	Edna Margarita Rudd Lucena	Top 15	
1965	María Victoria Ocampo Gómez	Top 15	
1964	Alba Virginia Ramírez Plaza	Unplaced	
1963	Maria Cristina Alvarez González	Top 15	
1962	Olga Lucía Botero Orozco	Top 15	
1961	Patricia Whitman Owen	Unplaced	
1960	María Stella Márquez de Araneta	Top 15	
1959	Olga Beatriz Pumarejo Korkor	Top 15	
1958	Luz Marina Zuluaga †	Miss Universe 1958	

== See also ==
- Miss Colombia
- Miss Mundo Colombia
- Miss Earth Colombia
- Miss Grand Colombia
