= Miss Colombia 2017 =

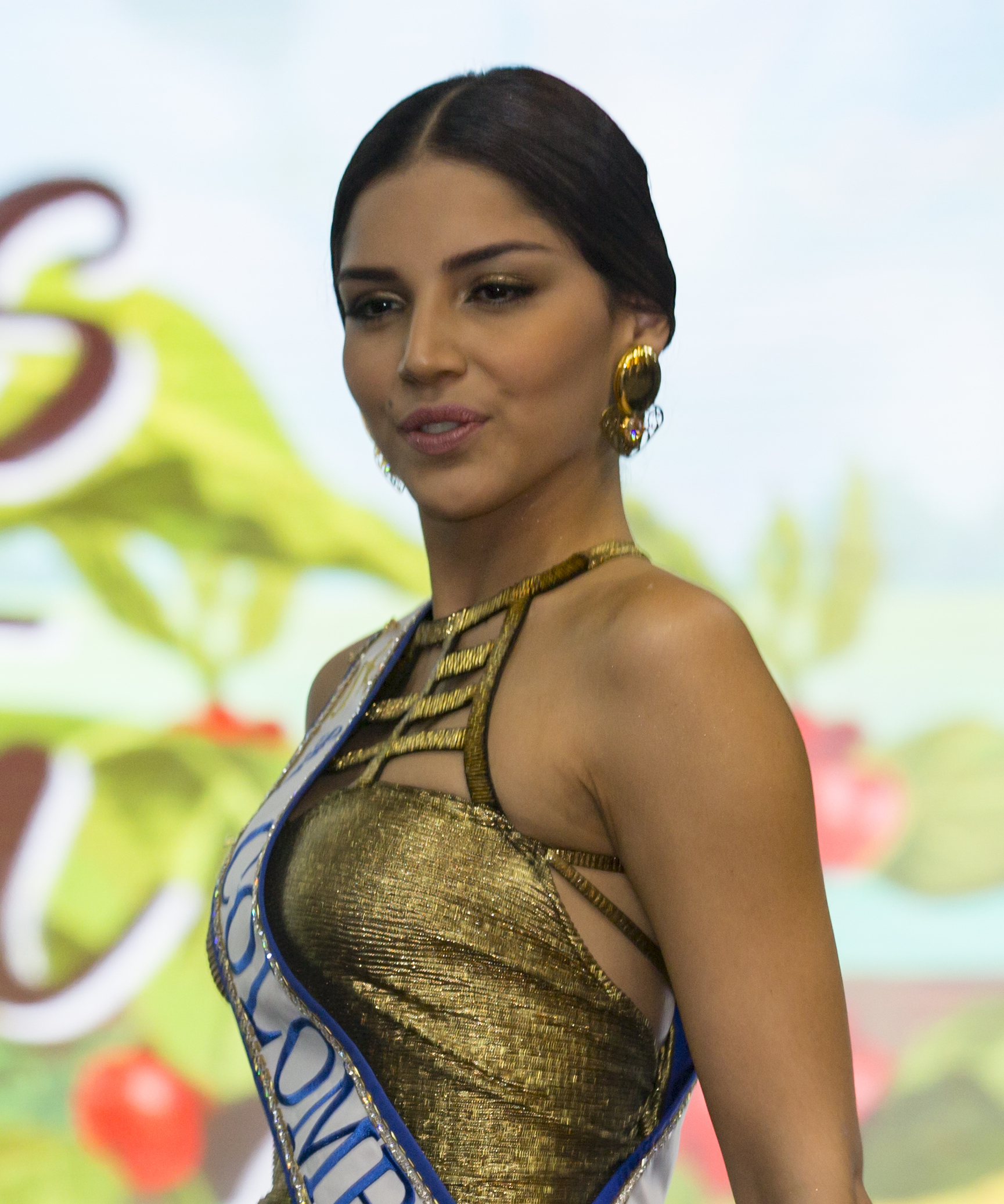
- Laura González, Señorita Colombia 2017
- Date: March 20, 2017
- Presenters: Luciano D' Alessandro; Andrea Serna; Carlos Torres; Cristina Hurtado
- Entertainment: Luis Fonsi, Piso 21, Víctor Manuelle, Miguel Bosé, Herencia de Timbiquí
- Venue: Centro de Convenciones Hotel Las Américas Cartagena Cartagena, Colombia
- Broadcaster: RCN TV
- Entrants: 23
- Placements: 10
- Withdrawals: Bucaramanga, Buenaventura, Caquetá, Sucre
- Returns: Boyacá, Caldas, Cauca, Córdoba
- Winner: Laura González; Cartagena
- Congeniality: Estefanía Sierra Martínez; Caldas
- Best National Costume: Johana Becerra; Boyacá
- Photogenic: Mayra Vitoviz; Cauca

Miss Colombia 2017 was the 64th edition of the Miss Colombia pageant. It was held on March 20, 2017 in Cartagena, Colombia.

At the end of the event, Andrea Tovar of Chocó crowned Laura González of Cartagena D.T. and C as Miss Colombia 2017. She represented Colombia in Miss Universe 2017 and placed 1st Runner-Up.

== Results ==
=== Placements ===
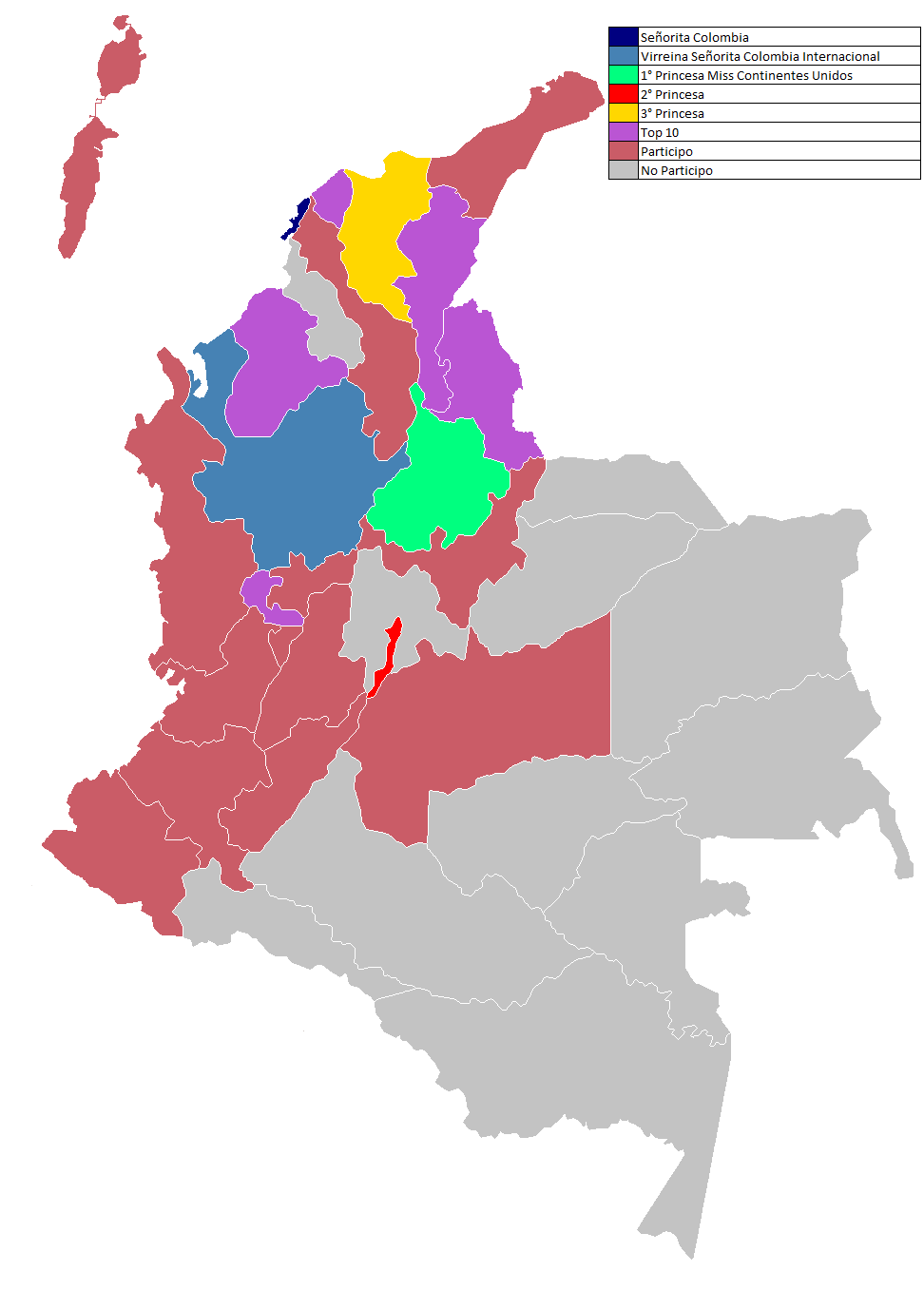
Señorita Colombia 2017

=== Color keys ===
- The contestant was a Finalist/Runner-up in an International pageant.
- The contestant did not place.

Placement	Contestants	International Placement
Miss Colombia 2017	Cartagena – Laura González	1st Runner-Up – Miss Universe 2017
1st Runner-Up	Antioquia – Vanessa Pulgarin	Unplaced – Miss International 2017
2nd Runner-Up	Santander – Yenniffer Hernández Jaimes	4th Runner-Up – Miss United Continents 2017
3rd Runner-Up	Bogotá – Vanessa Domínguez Field	
4th Runner-Up	Magdalena – Maria Fernanda Betancur Moreno	
Top 10
Top 10	Atlántico – Martha Luz Martínez Insignares	1st Runner-Up – Miss Supranational 2017
Top 10	Cesar – Anabella Castro Sierra	4th Runner-Up – Miss International 2018
Top 10	Córdoba – Daniella Assís Fierro; Norte de Santander – Leidy Gimera Ropero Silva; Risaralda – Valeria Vélez Parra	

=== Scores ===
Miss Colombia 2017
1st Runner-up
2nd Runner-up
3rd Runner-up
4th Runner-up
Top 10

Department	Evening Gown*	Swimsuit*	Average
Cartagena, D.T. and C.	9.9 (1)	9.8 (1)	9.85 (1)
Antioquia	9.5 (2)	9.6 (2)	9.55 (2)
Santander	9.4 (3)	9.4 (3)	9.40 (3)
Bogotá D.C.	9.3 (4)	9.3 (5)	9.30 (5)
Magdalena	9.0 (8)	8.6 (9)	8.80 (9)
Cesar	9.3 (5)	9.4 (4)	9.35 (4)
Atlántico	9.2 (6)	9.2 (6)	9.20 (6)
Córdoba	9.1 (7)	9.0 (7)	9.05 (7)
Risaralda	8.9 (10)	8.9 (8)	8.90 (8)
Norte de Santander	9.0 (9)	8.4 (11)	8.70 (10)
Boyacá	8.2 (12)	8.6 (10)	8.40 (11)
Valle	8.4 (11)	8.3 (12)	8.35 (12)
San Andrés, P. and S.C.	8.2 (13)	8.2 (13)	8.20 (13)
Quindío	8.1 (14)	8.2 (14)	8.15 (14)
Bolívar	8.0 (15)	8.2 (15)	8.10 (15)
Chocó	7.8 (16)	8.1 (16)	7.95 (16)
Cauca	7.7 (17)	8.0 (17)	7.85 (17)
Guajira	7.6 (19)	8.0 (18)	7.80 (18)
Huila	7.7 (18)	7.9 (19)	7.80 (19)
Caldas	7.6 (20)	7.8 (20)	7.70 (20)
Meta	7.6 (21)	7.8 (21)	7.70 (21)
Tolima	7.6 (22)	7.4 (23)	7.50 (22)
Nariño	7.3 (23)	7.5 (22)	7.40 (23)

*These are just the judges scores, they are not the official scores because Colombian viewers votes haven't been taken yet at that time.

== Specials Awards ==
Award	Winner
Best Regional Costume (Mejor Traje Artesanal)	Boyacá - Leisly Johana Becerra Mogollón
Miss Congeanilaty (Mejor Compañera)	Caldas - Estefanía Sierra Martínez
Miss Photogenic (Señorita Fotogenica)	Cauca - Mayra Daniela Vitoviz Medina
Best Body (Figura Bodytech)	Antioquia - Vanessa Pulgarín Monsalve
Queen of the Police (Reina de la Policía)	Cesar - Anabella Castro Sierra
Miss Elegance (Señorita Elegancia Primatela)	Cesar - Anabella Castro Sierra
Zapatilla Real	Atlántico - Martha Luz Martínez Insignares
Miss Punctuality (Miss Puntualidad)	Atlántico - Martha Luz Martínez Insignares
Cooking Contest (Reto Oster)	Antioquia - Vanessa Pulgarin Monsalve

== Delegates ==
23 delegates have been selected to compete.

Department / District	Name	Age	Height	Hometown
Antioquia	Vanessa Pulgarín Monsalve	25	178 cm (5 ft 10 in)	Medellín
Atlántico	Martha Luz "Tica" Martínez Insignares	18	173 cm (5 ft 8 in)	Sabanalarga
Bogotá D.C.	Vanessa Domínguez Field	21	176 cm (5 ft 9 1/2 in)	Cali
Bolívar	Laura Margarita Barbosa Tejada	23	174 cm (5 ft 8 1/2 in)	Cartagena
Boyacá	Leisly Johana Becerra Mogollón	23	173 cm (5 ft 8 in)	Belén
Caldas	Estefanía Sierra Martínez	21	167 cm (5 ft 5 1/2 in)	Manizales
Cartagena, D.T. and C.	Laura González Ospina	22	178 cm (5 ft 10 in)	Cali
Cauca	Mayra Daniela Vitoviz Medina	24	170 cm (5 ft 7 in)	La Plata
Cesar	Anabella Castro Sierra	20	177 cm (5 ft 9 1/2 in)	Valledupar
Chocó	Carmen Yaruny Serna Pino	25	165 cm (5 ft 5 in)	Quibdó
Córdoba	Daniella Assís Fierro	23	168 cm (5 ft 6 in)	Cereté
Guajira	Zeger Iguarán Issa	24	172 cm (5 ft 7 1/2 in)	Maicao
Huila	Natalia Andrea Perdomo Casanova	21	175 cm (5 ft 9 in)	Teruel
Magdalena	María Fernanda Betancur Moreno	21	165 cm (5 ft 5 in)	Valledupar
Meta	Mayra Geraldine Naranjo Beltrán	22	171 cm (5 ft 7 1/2 in)	Villavicencio
Nariño	Camila Andrea Aguirre Jaramillo	19	171 cm (5 ft 7 1/2 in)	Tumaco
Norte de Santander	Leidy Gimena Ropero Silva	20	172 cm (5 ft 7 1/2 in)	Los Patios
Quindío	Mariluz Salcedo Carrillo	24	167 cm (5 ft 5 1/2 in)	Calarca
Risaralda	Valeria Vélez Parra	22	173 cm (5 ft 8 in)	Pereira
San Andrés, P. and S.C.	Yasleth Milena Castillo Nelson	23	175 cm (5 ft 9 in)	San Andrés
Santander	Yenniffer Hernández Jaimes	19	175 cm (5 ft 9 in)	Galán
Tolima	Karen Julieth Murillo Gómez	24	169 cm (5 ft 6 1/2 in)	El Espinal
Valle	Francesca Calero Mendoza	24	173 cm (5 ft 8 in)	Cali
