= Yopal =

- Municipality and town
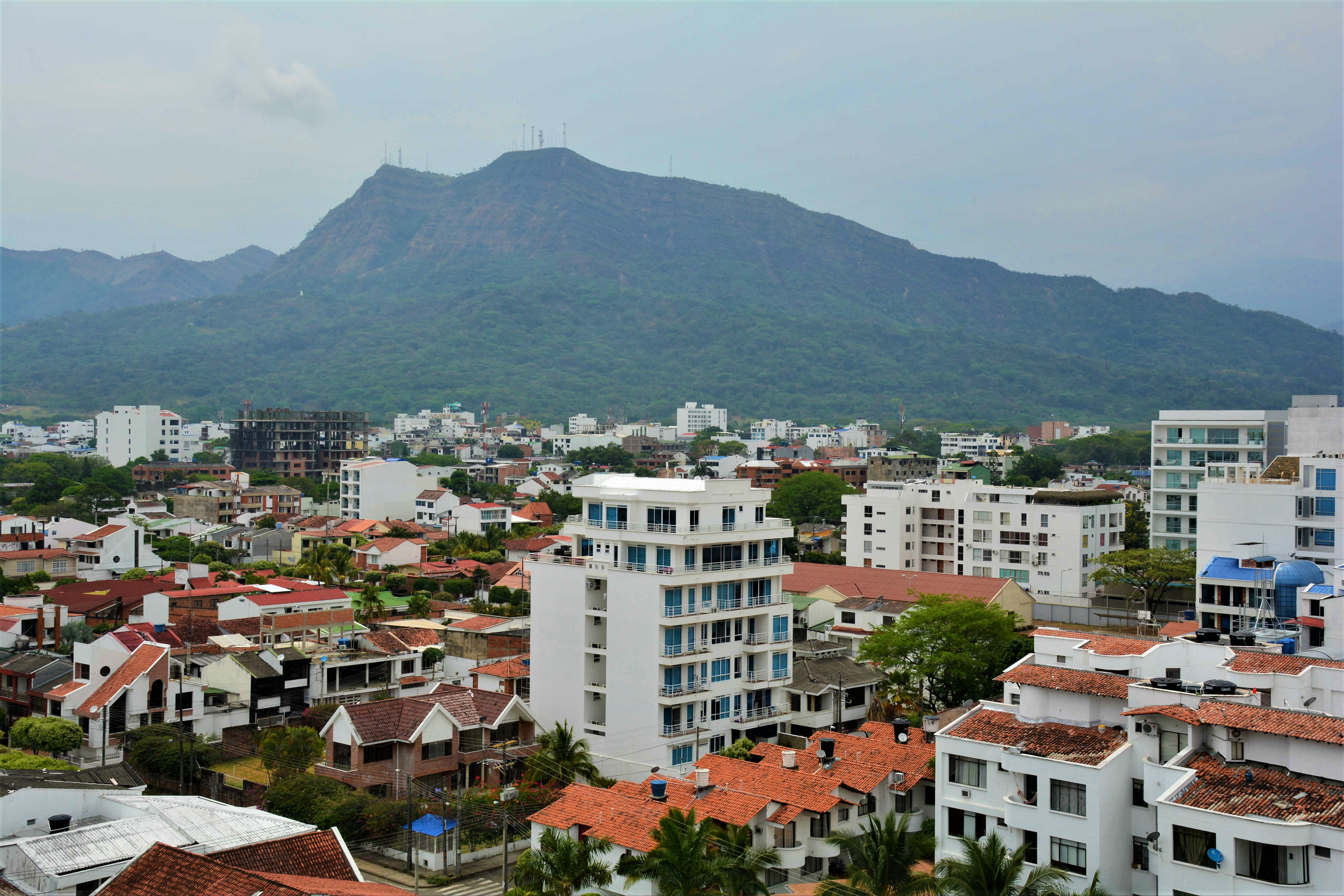
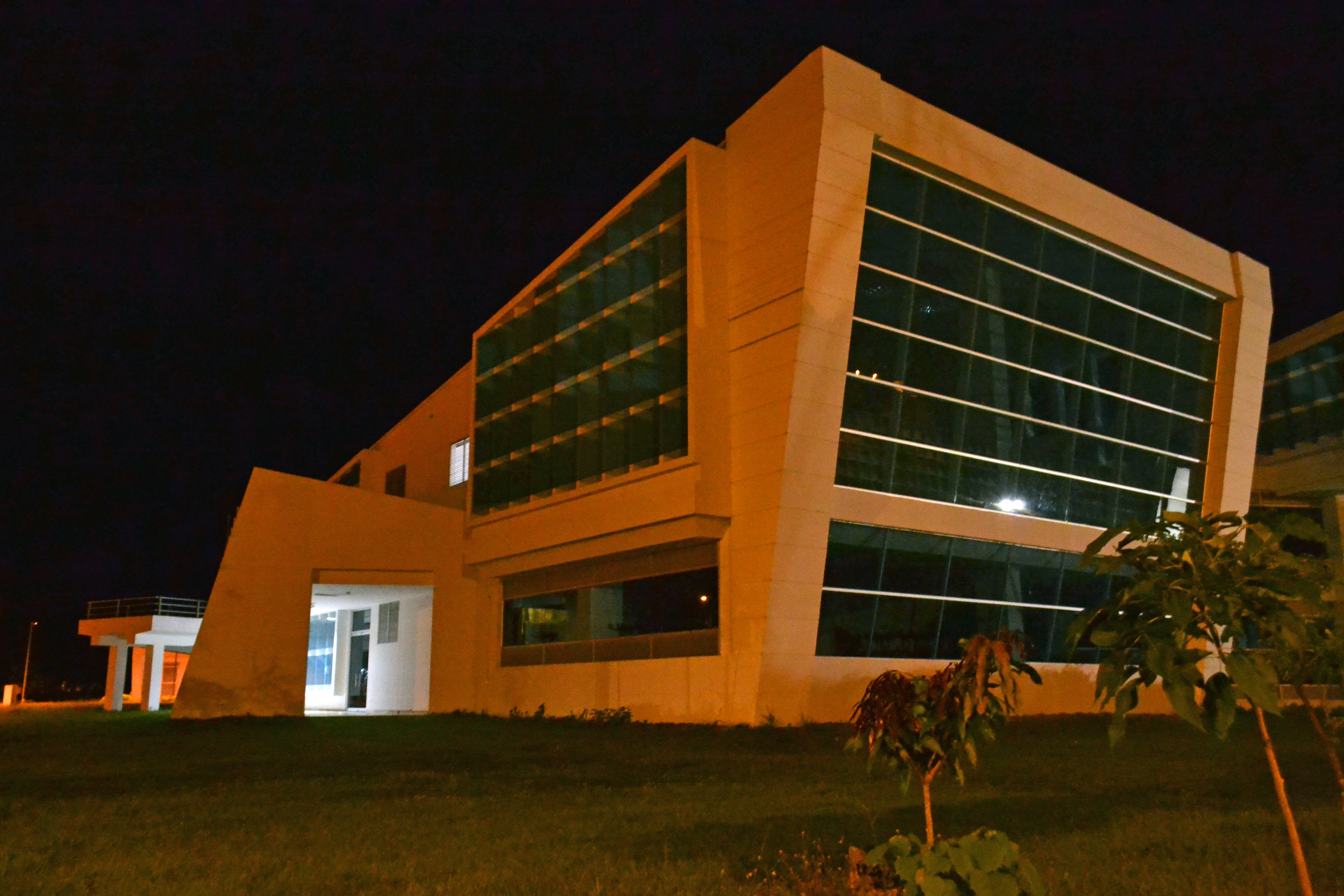
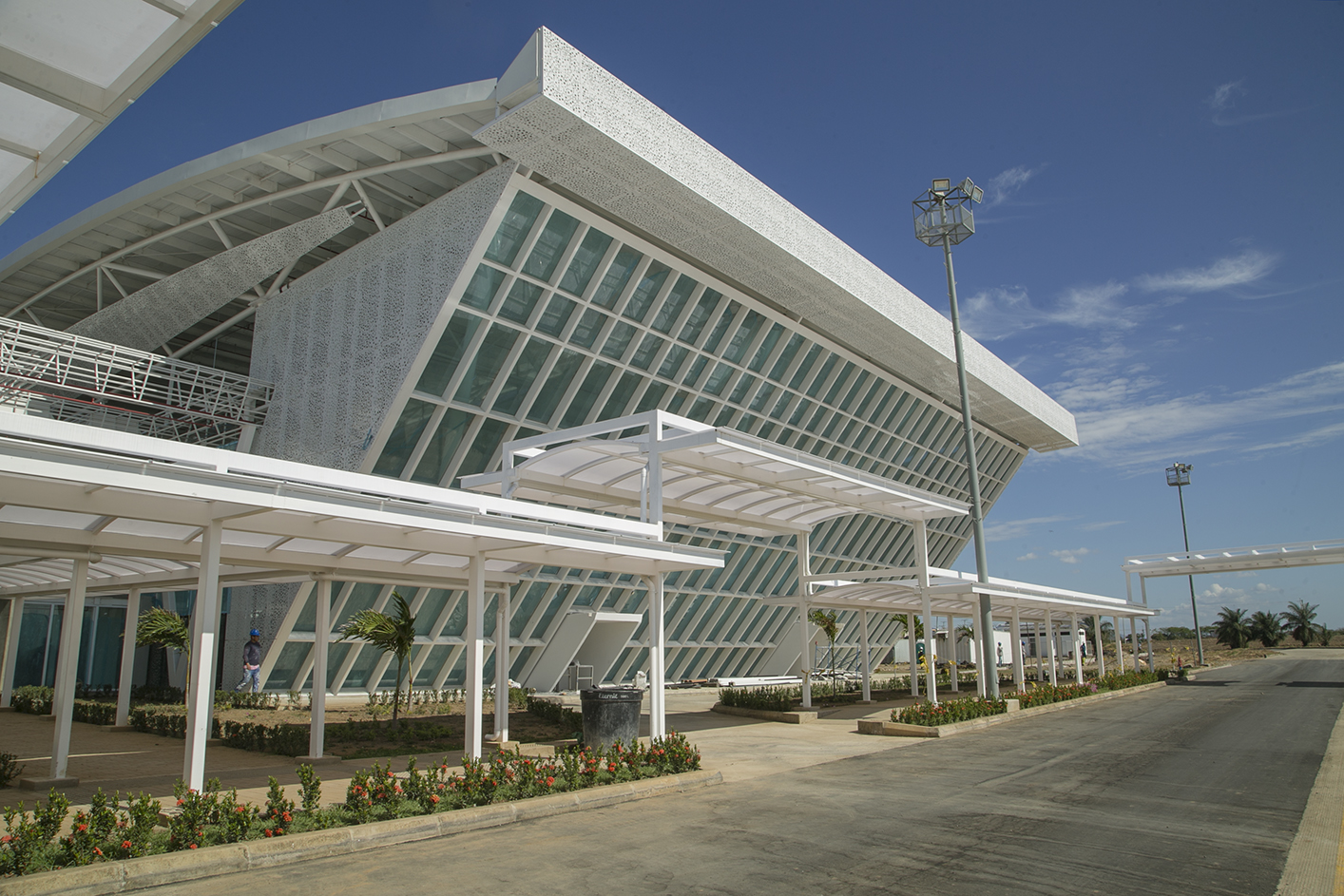
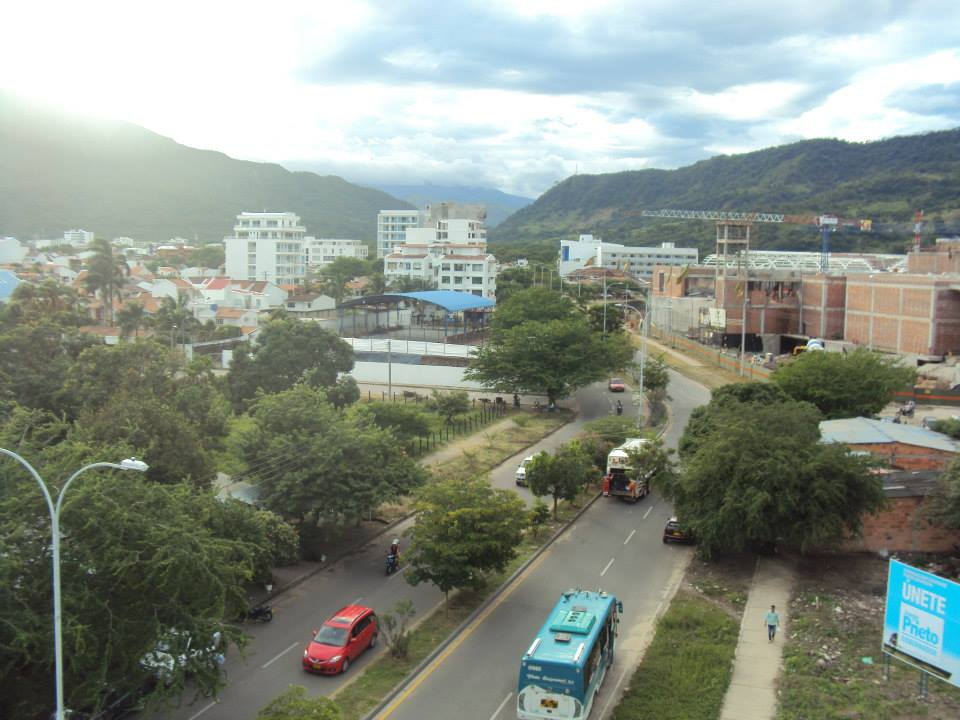
- Top: Yopal from the Chamber of Commerce, Second: Cultural center, Third: El Alcaraván Airport, Four: Airport and Nunchía Avenue

- Flag Coat of arms

- Location of the municipality and town of Yopal in the Casanare Department of Colombia.

- Location in Colombia
- Coordinates: 5°21′0″N 72°24′36″W
- Country: Colombia
- Region: Orinoquía Region
- Department: Casanare Department
- Founded: 1915

Area
  - Municipality and town: 2,483 km^{2} (959 sq mi)
  - Urban: 25.09 km^{2} (9.69 sq mi)
- Elevation: 350 m (1,150 ft)

Population (2024)
  - Municipality and town: 194,079
  - Density: 78.16/km^{2} (202.4/sq mi)
- Demonym: Yopaleño
- Time zone: UTC-05 (Colombia Standard Time)
- Postal code: 850001-9
- Area code: 57 + 8
- Website: Official website (in Spanish)

Yopal (Spanish pronunciation: [ɟʝoˈpal]) is a municipality and capital city of the department of Casanare in Colombia and the second most populated and important city in the Orinoquía region after Villavicencio.

== History ==
Before the period of the Spanish colonization of the Americas, the land on which Yopal stands was occupied by the indigenous Achagua people. The name Yopal descends from the region's abundance of Anadenanthera peregrina, often otherwise called yopo.

== Geographic information ==
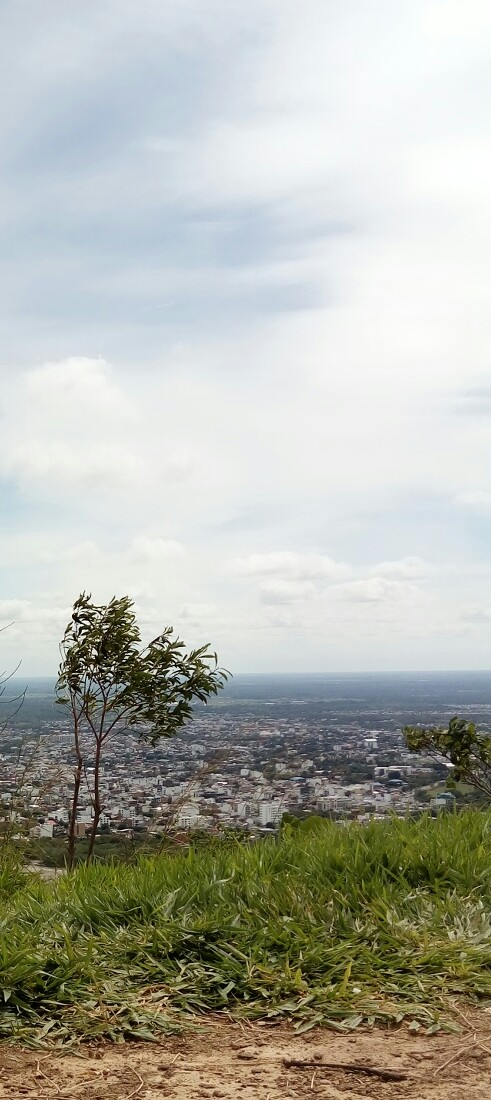
Skyline of Yopal from the Cerro Buena vista (Buena Vista Hill)

- Population: 191.133 inhabitants
- Elevation: 350 metres or 1,150 feet
- Area: 2,771 square kilometres or 1,070 square miles
- Distance from Bogotá: 387 kilometres or 240 miles
- Median temperature: 26 °C or 78.8 °F

== Born in Yopal ==
- Camila Avella, Model and Miss Universe Colombia 2023
- Jeffry Romero, professional cyclist

== Climate ==
Yopal has a tropical monsoon climate (Köppen Am). Although it borders closely on a tropical savanna climate (Aw), Yopal’s climate is much more typical of a tropical monsoon climate in having a short but distinct dry season that covers the months of December to March, and a very long wet season covering the remaining eight months.

Climate data for Yopal (El Alcaraván Airport), elevation 325 m (1,066 ft), (1991–2020)
Month	Jan	Feb	Mar	Apr	May	Jun	Jul	Aug	Sep	Oct	Nov	Dec	Year
Mean daily maximum °C (°F)	32.5 (90.5)	33.2 (91.8)	33.2 (91.8)	31.5 (88.7)	30.8 (87.4)	29.7 (85.5)	29.9 (85.8)	30.5 (86.9)	30.7 (87.3)	30.8 (87.4)	31.1 (88.0)	31.7 (89.1)	31.3 (88.3)
Daily mean °C (°F)	27.9 (82.2)	27.9 (82.2)	28.0 (82.4)	26.4 (79.5)	25.4 (77.7)	24.8 (76.6)	24.6 (76.3)	25.0 (77.0)	25.6 (78.1)	25.9 (78.6)	26.2 (79.2)	26.9 (80.4)	26.1 (79.0)
Mean daily minimum °C (°F)	21.0 (69.8)	21.3 (70.3)	21.5 (70.7)	21.1 (70.0)	20.6 (69.1)	20.3 (68.5)	20.1 (68.2)	20.4 (68.7)	20.6 (69.1)	20.8 (69.4)	20.9 (69.6)	21.0 (69.8)	20.8 (69.4)
Average precipitation mm (inches)	8.5 (0.33)	60.4 (2.38)	79.3 (3.12)	279.0 (10.98)	333.7 (13.14)	298.0 (11.73)	312.3 (12.30)	255.4 (10.06)	275.9 (10.86)	255.0 (10.04)	131.8 (5.19)	20.2 (0.80)	2,406.4 (94.74)
Average precipitation days	1	4	7	15	16	17	18	17	15	14	10	4	138
Average relative humidity (%)	60	61	64	78	82	84	83	81	80	78	76	69	75
Mean monthly sunshine hours	251.1	194.8	155.0	126.0	139.5	123.0	136.4	145.7	165.0	176.7	189.0	238.7	2,040.9
Mean daily sunshine hours	8.1	6.9	5.0	4.2	4.5	4.1	4.4	4.7	5.5	5.7	6.3	7.7	5.6
Source: Instituto de Hidrologia Meteorologia y Estudios Ambientales Instituto de Hidrología, Meteorología y Estudios Ambientales (IDEAM)
