= Miss Universe Colombia 2024 =

5th Miss Universe Colombia pageant

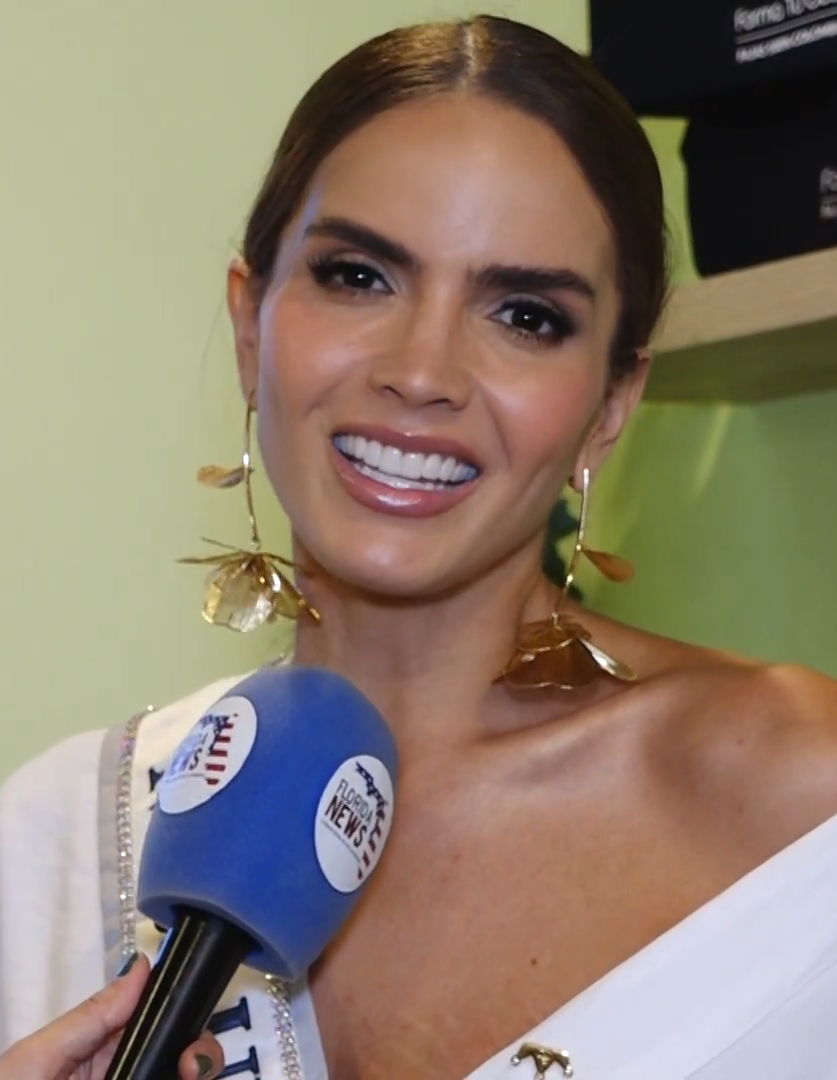
- Daniela Toloza, Miss Universe Colombia 2024 winner
- Date: June 2, 2024
- Presenters: Valeria Ayos; Carlos Claro; Renzy Konper
- Venue: Puerta de Oro Centro de Eventos del Caribe, Barranquilla, Colombia
- Broadcaster: RCN Televisión
- Entrants: 30
- Placements: 16
- Debuts: Barranquilla; San Andrés; Región Andina; Tumaco
- Withdrawals: Amazonas; Boyacá; Guainía; La Guajira; Norte de Santander
- Returns: Bolivar; Cartagena; Chocó; Córdoba; Huila; Magdalena; Meta
- Winner: Daniela Toloza; Valle del Cauca

Miss Universe Colombia 2024 was the fifth Miss Universe Colombia pageant, held at the Puerta de Oro Centro de Eventos del Caribe in Barranquilla, Colombia, on June 2, 2024.

Camila Avella of Casanare crowned Daniela Toloza of Valle del Cauca as her successor at the end of the event. Toloza represented Colombia at the Miss Universe 2024 in México City, México, but was Unplaced.

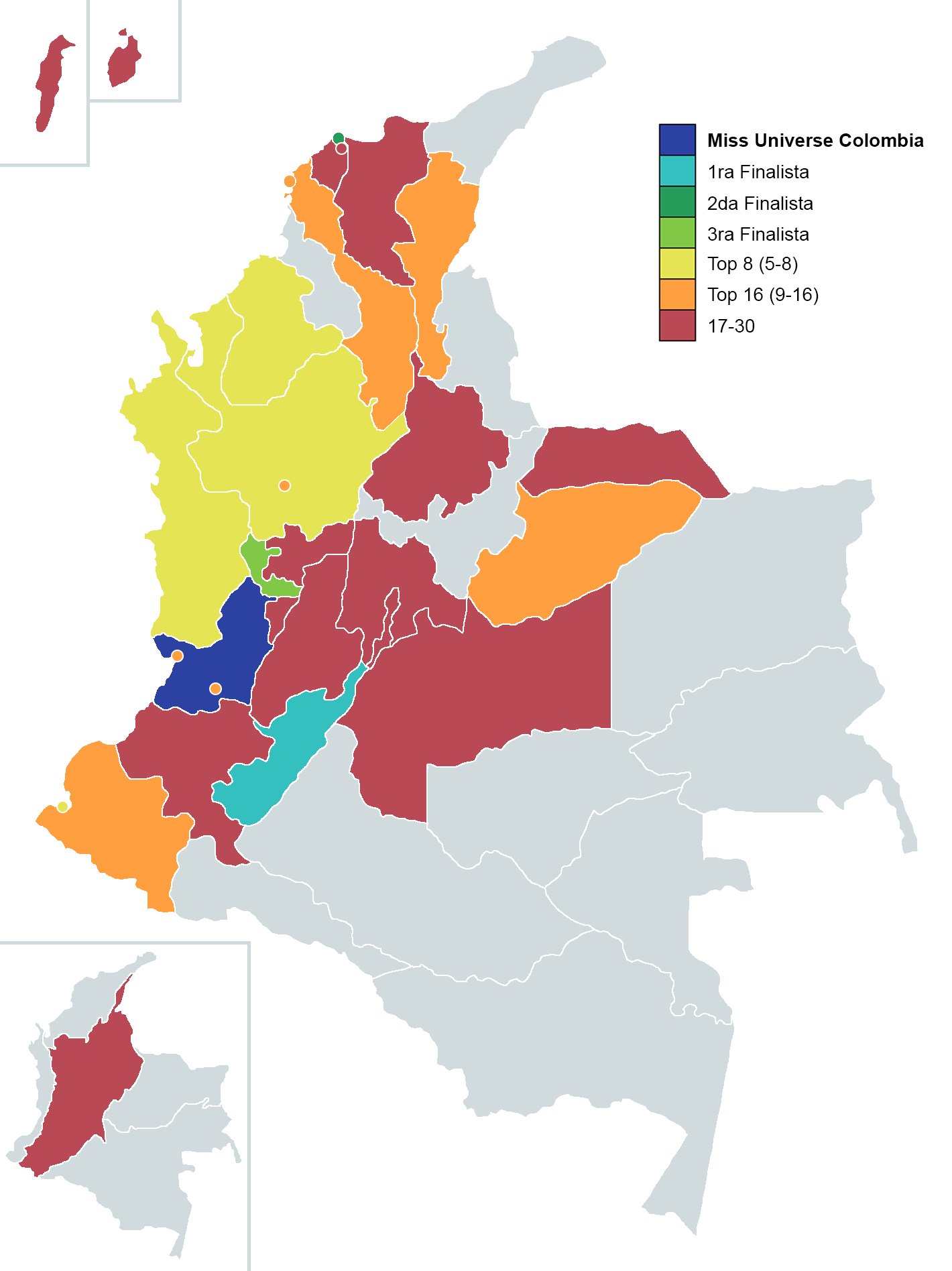
Official results

== Results ==
=== Placements ===
Placement	Contestant
Miss Universe Colombia 2024	Valle del Cauca – Daniela Toloza
1st Runner-Up	Huila – María Alejandra Salazar
2nd Runner-Up	Barranquilla – Kimberly Hooker
3rd Runner-Up	Risaralda – Leidy Yuliana Gómez
Top 8	Antioquia – Mariana Zuleta; Chocó – Leicy Rivas; Córdoba – María Clara Cañavera; Tumaco – Yoselin Riascos
Top 16	Bolívar – Kelly Reales; Buenaventura – Luisa María López; Cali – Manuela Castaño; Cartagena – Kaina Andrea Mercado; Casanare – Estefani Ariza; Cesar – Natalia Santiago; Medellín – Valentina Pérez Burgos; Nariño – Angela Chamorro

== Contestants ==
30 contestants competed for the title.

City/Department	Contestant	Age (Note: Ages at the time of the pageant)
Antioquia	Mariana Zuleta Muñoz	25
Arauca	Laura Valentina Garcés	25
Atlántico	Oriana Chamorro Romero	24
Barranquilla	Kimberly Hooker Naranjo	27
Bogotá	Sofía Botero Rojas	24
Bolívar	Kelly Reales Coneo	26
Buenaventura	Luisa María López Gómez	23
Caldas	Nahomi Valencia	18
Cali	Manuela Castaño Cruz	28
Cartagena	Kaina Andrea Mercado	29
Casanare	Estefani Ariza	30
Cauca	Alison Arenas Villa	26
Cesar	Natalia Santiago Cohen	26
Chocó	Leicy Rivas Moreno	24
Córdoba	María Clara Cañavera Ibáñez	23
Cundinamarca	Sabrina Soltau	26
Huila	María Alejandra Salazar	26
Magdalena	Natalia Andrea Pinzón Jiménez	25
Medellín	Valentina Pérez Burgos	24
Meta	Gabriela Giraldo Céspedes	24
Nariño	Angela Chamorro Rosero	24
Quindío	María José Villegas	23
Región Andina	Nathalia Tasama	24
Risaralda	Leidy Yuliana Gómez González	27
San Andrés	Janys Paternina Ficquare	27
Santander	Alejandra Rodríguez Angarita	21
Soledad	María Fernanda Pico Vecino	22
Tolima	Indira Stefany Hernández	29
Tumaco	Yoselin Riascos García	29
Valle	Daniela Toloza Rocha	30

== Judges ==
- Bárbara Palacios — Miss Universe 1986 from Venezuela
- Michael Calderón — Manager and businessman
- Adriana Martin — Social communicator and nutritionist
- Christian Salazar — Dentist
- Mariela Centeno — Talent scout and manager
