= Vanessa Pulgarin =

Colombian professional model and beauty queen

Vanessa Pulgarín
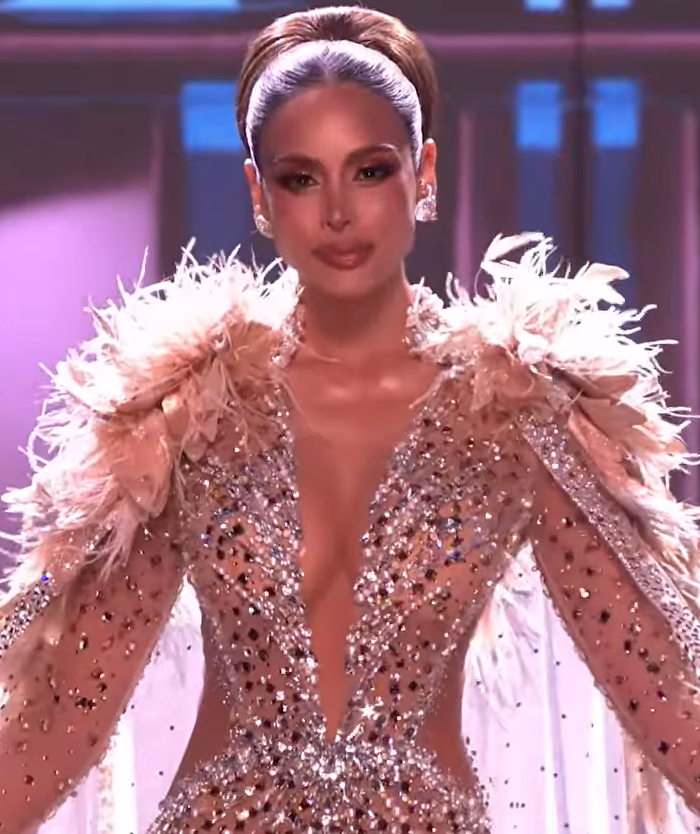
- Pulgarín in 2026
- Born: Vanessa Pulgarin Monsalve; September 13, 1991 (age 35); Medellín, Antioquia, Colombia
- Occupation: Model
- Beauty pageant titleholder
- Title: Miss International Colombia 2017; Miss Universe Colombia 2025
- Major competitions: Miss Colombia 2017; (1st Runner-Up); Miss International 2017; (Unplaced); Miss Universe Colombia 2025; (Winner); Miss Universe 2025; (Top 12); MGI All Stars 1st Edition; (Winner)

Vanessa Pulgarín Monsalve (born September 13, 1991 in Medellín, Antioquia, Colombia) is a Colombian model and beauty pageant titleholder who won Miss International Colombia 2017, and represented Colombia at the Miss International 2017 in Japan. She later won Miss Universe Colombia 2025 and represented her country at Miss Universe 2025 in Thailand where she placed in the Top 12. In 2026, Pulgarín competed in and won the inaugural edition of MGI All Stars.

== Personal life ==
Vanessa Pulgarín was born in the city of Medellín, Antioquia, Colombia on September 13, 1991. She is the daughter of Carlos Pulgarín and Dalila Monsalve Jiménez. Currently, she studies Social Communication and Journalism at the Pontifical Bolivarian University. Pulgarín lived for several years in Sydney, New South Wales, Australia where as a model, she participated in catwalks and photoshoots.

== Pageantry ==
=== Señorita Colombia ===
On July 30, 2016, Pulgarín entered and won Miss Antioquia, and later represented her department at Miss Colombia 2017, where she was runner-up to Laura González of Cartagena.

=== Miss International ===
Pulgarín represented Colombia at Miss International 2017, held at the Tokyo Dome City Hall in Tokyo, Japan, on November 14, 2017, and was unplaced.

=== Miss Universe ===
In 2025, Pulgarín represented Antioquia and won Miss Universe Colombia 2025 on September 28, 2025. She was crowned by Daniela Toloza from Valle del Cauca. She represented Colombia at Miss Universe 2025 in Pak Kret, Thailand, and reached the top 12.

Awards and achievements
| Preceded by None | MGI All Stars; 1st Edittion | Succeeded by Incumbent |
| Preceded by Daniela Toloza, Valle del Cauca | Miss Universe Colombia; 2025 | Succeeded by María Alejandra López, Risaralda |
| Preceded by Mariana Zuleta Muñoz, Antioquia | Miss Universe Antioquia; 2025 | Succeeded by Andrea Aguilera, Antioquia |
| Preceded by Daniela Herrera, Cesar | Miss Colombia International; 2017 | Succeeded by Anabella Castro, Cesar |
| Preceded by Daniela Herrera, Cesar | Miss Colombia 1st Runner-Up; 2017 | Succeeded by Isabella Atehortúa, Antioquia |
