= Elvis Rivas =

Colombian footballer (born 1987)

Personal information
- Full name: Elvis Antonio Rivas Palacios
- Date of birth: February 19, 1987 (age 39)
- Place of birth: Quibdó, Colombia
- Height: 5 ft 7 in (1.70 m)
- Positions: Defender; forward

Youth career
- –2005: Cúcuta Deportivo

Senior career*
Years	Team	Apps	(Gls)
2006–2008	Cúcuta Deportivo		(1)
2009	Atlético Bucaramanga		
2010	Deportivo Pasto		(1)
2011	Pacífico FC	11	(0)
2012	Atlético Bucaramanga	6	(0)
- * Club domestic league appearances and goals as of December 2, 2012

Elvis Antonio Rivas Palacios (born February 19, 1987) is a Colombian football defender.

He was part of Cucuta 2006 Colombian 1st division Championship and helped Cucuta get to the semi-finals of the Copa Libertadores 2007

== Honors ==
- Champions Colombian Primera A, 2006 Deportivo Cucuta
- Semi-finalist of Copa Libertories with Cucuta in 2007
