= Anabella Castro =

Columbian model (born 1996)

- Born: Anabella Castro Sierra; 10 November 1996 (age 29); Valledupar, Colombia
- Education: University of La Sabana
- Height: 1.78 m (5 ft 10 in)
- Beauty pageant titleholder
- Title: Señorita Cesar 2017; Miss Colombia International 2018
- Hair color: Dark Brown
- Eye color: Brown
- Major competitions: Miss Colombia 2017; (Top 10); Miss International 2018; (4th Runner-Up)

Anabella Castro Sierra (born 10 November 1996) is a Colombian model, social communicator and beauty pageant titleholder. She was appointed as Miss International Colombia 2018 by Miss Colombia pageant (Concurso Nacional de Belleza). She represented Colombia at Miss International 2018 pageant and became the 4th Runner-up.

== Early life ==
Anabella Castro was born on November 10, 1996, in Valledupar, Cesar. Her father is Ciro Castro Álvarez and her mother is Rosa Lila Sierra Vergara. She studied social communication and Journalism at University of La Sabana in Chía, Cundinamarca. She speaks Spanish and English.

== Pageantry ==
=== Señorita Colombia 2017 ===
Anabella represented the Cesar Department at the national beauty contest, Señorita Colombia 2017 held on 20 March 2017. She ended up placing in the Top 10 finalists and also bagged the 'Elegancia Prímatela' and 'Reina de la Policía' titles.

=== Miss International 2018 ===
Anabella was appointed as Miss Colombia International 2018 by Miss Colombia pageant (Concurso Nacional de Belleza) on 29 June 2018. She then represented Colombia at the Miss International 2018 pageant held in Tokyo, Japan, on November 9, 2018, where she became the 4th Runner-up making Colombia's placement after three years of consecutive unplacement through 2015 to 2017.

Awards and achievements
Preceded by (Japan) Natsuki Tsutsui	Miss International 4th Runner-up; 2018	Succeeded by (United Kingdom) Harriotte Lane
Preceded by (Cesar Department) Yudi Daniela Herrera Avendaño	Señorita Cesar; 2017	Succeeded by (Cesar Department) Jennifer Salazar
Preceded by Vanessa Pulgarin Monsalve	Miss Colombia International; 2018	Succeeded by Maria Alejandra Vengoechea
