= Miss Colombia 2015 =

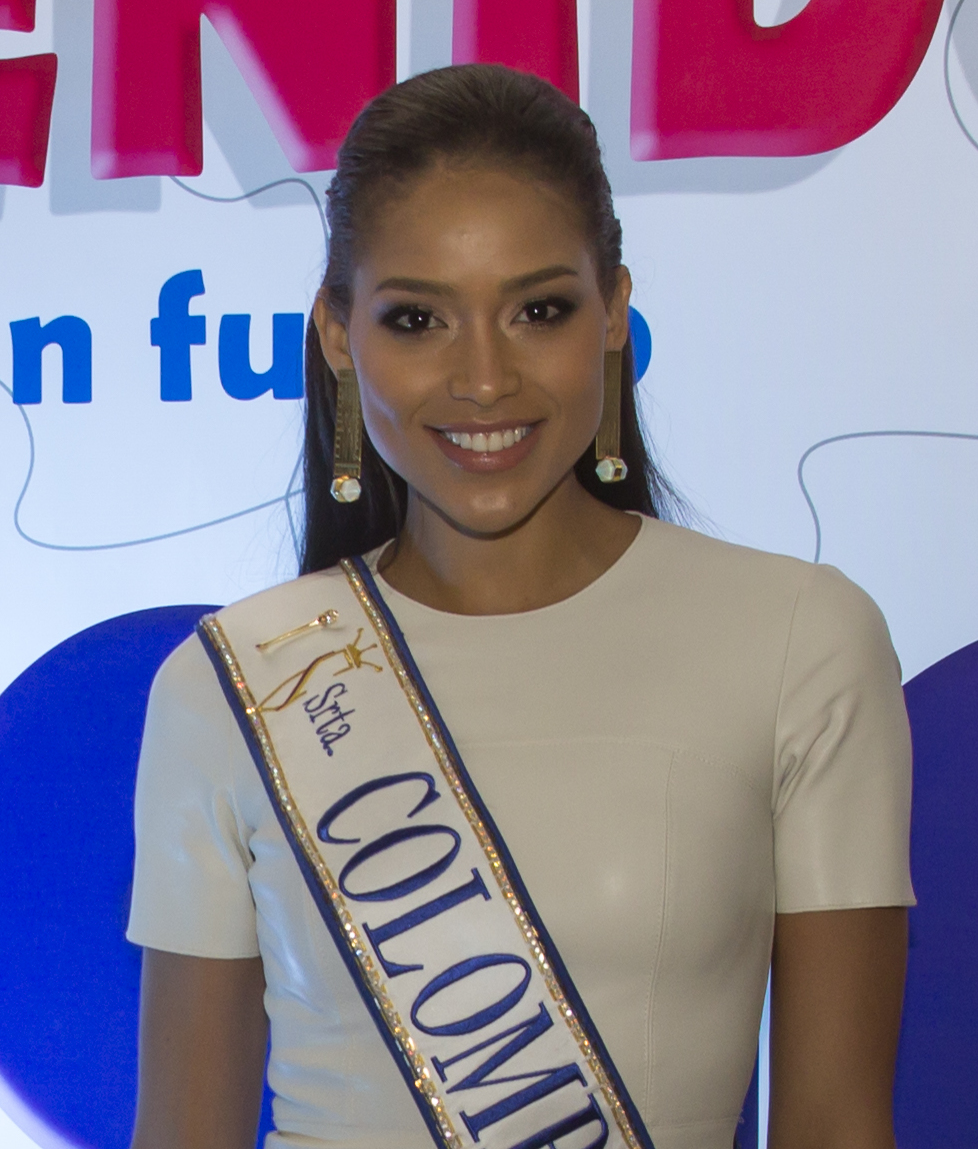
- Andrea Tovar, Miss Colombia 2015
- Date: November 16, 2015
- Presenters: Carlos Calero, Andrea Serna, Ariadna Gutiérrez
- Entertainment: Manuel Medrano y Silvestre Dangond
- Venue: Auditorio Getsemani-Centro de Convenciones Julio César Turbay Ayala, Cartagena, Colombia
- Broadcaster: RCN TV
- Entrants: 23
- Placements: 15
- Withdrawals: Arauca, Boyacá, Cauca, Córdoba, Cundinamarca
- Winner: Andrea Tovar; Chocó
- Best National Costume: Paula Clavijo; Bogotá
- Photogenic: Maria Camila Soleibe; Atlántico

Miss Colombia 2015 was the 63rd edition of the Miss Colombia pageant. It was held on November 16, 2015 in Cartagena, Colombia.

At the end of the event, Ariadna Gutiérrez of Sucre crowned Andrea Tovar of Chocó as Miss Colombia 2016, winning the crown for the department of Chocó for the second time after 14 years. She represented Colombia in Miss Universe 2016 and placed 2nd Runner-Up.

== Results ==
=== Placements ===
==== Color keys ====
- The contestant won in an International pageant.
- The contestant was a Finalist/Runner-up in an International pageant.
- The contestant was a Semi-Finalist in an International pageant.
- The contestant did not place.

Placement	Contestant	International Placement
Miss Colombia 2015	Chocó – Andrea Tovar	2nd Runner-Up – Miss Universe 2016
1st Runner-Up	Cesar – Yudi Daniela Herrera Avendaño	Unplaced – Miss International 2016
2nd Runner-Up	Antioquia – Alejandra Ochoa López	Top 15 – Top Model of the World 2016
3rd Runner-Up	Atlántico – Maria Camila Soleibe Alarcón	Winner – Reina Hispanoamericana 2016
4th Runner-Up	Buenaventura – Carmen Ibeth Alomía Prado	
Top 15	Bogotá – Paula Milena Clavijo Díaz; Bucaramanga – Ashley Ordóñez Arévalo; Cartagena – Madelein López Camelo; Magdalena – Valentina Castro López; Meta – Ana Maria Landaeta Gordillo; Quindío – Valentina Agudelo Hernández; San Andrés – Josseidy Mileidy Escalona Bent; Sucre- Paula Andrea Correa Ochoa; Tolima – Dahian Lorena Muñoz Quiñones; Valle – Dayana Julieth Guerrero Mora	

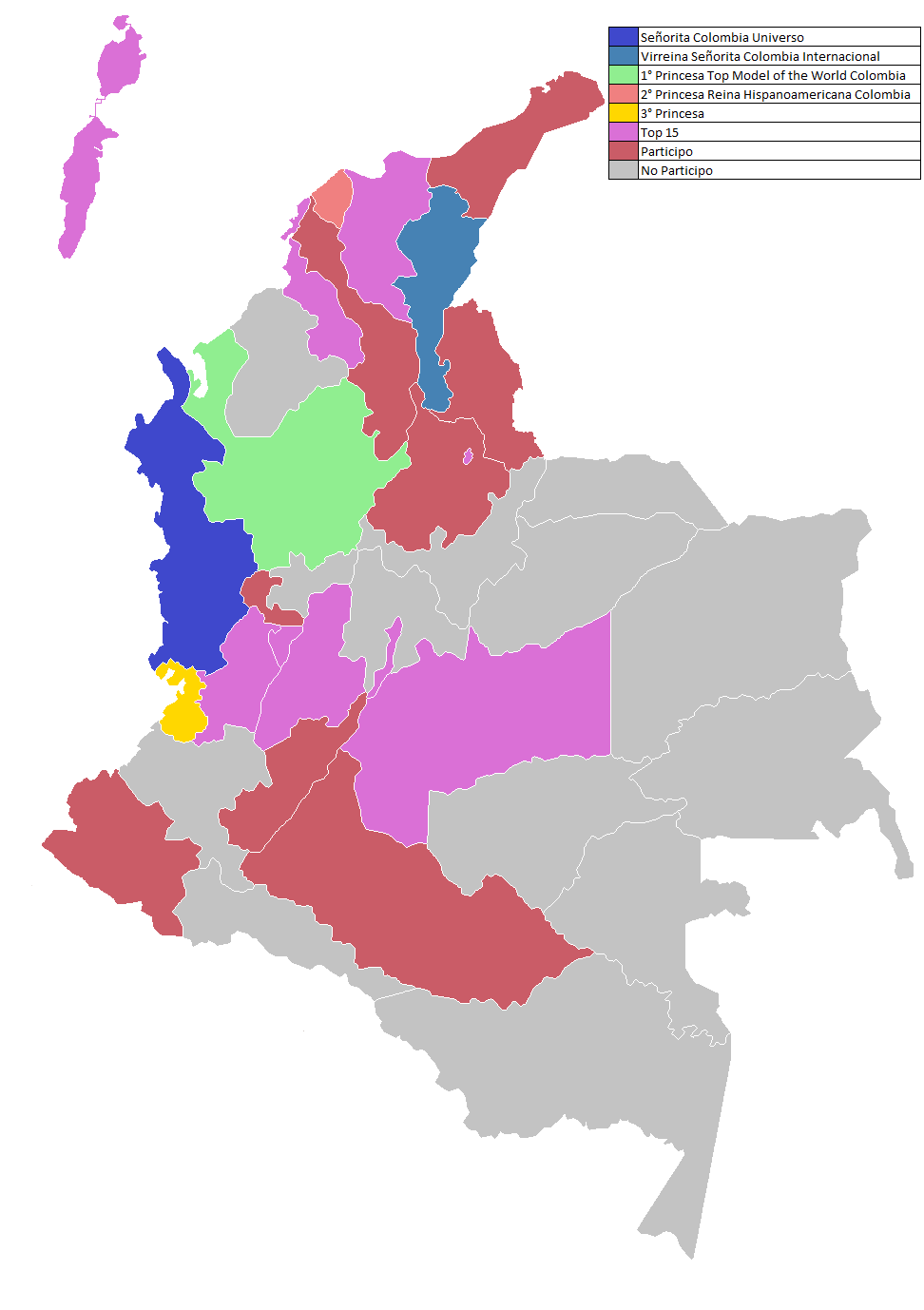
Señorita Colombia 2015

== Scores ==
=== Color keys ===
- Miss Colombia 2015-2016
- 1st Runner-up
- 2nd Runner-up
- 3rd Runner-up
- 4th Runner-up
- Top 15

Department	Preliminary Evening Gown*	Swimsuit*	Average
Chocó	9,95 (1)	9,99 (1)	9,97 (1)
Cesar	9,65 (2)	9,60 (3)	9,62 (3)
Antioquia	9,50 (4)	9,82 (2)	9,66 (2)
Atlántico	9,00 (9)	9,22 (5)	9,11 (7)
Buenaventura	9,20 (7)	9,35 (4)	9,27 (5)
Cartagena	9,60 (3)	9,60 (3)	9,60 (4)
Meta	9,27 (5)	9,15 (6)	9,21 (6)
Quindío	8,85 (12)	9,05 (7)	8,95 (9)
San Andrés, P. and S.C.	9,22 (6)	8,92 (8)	9,07 (8)
Sucre	8,80 (13)	8.80 (10)	8.80 (10)
Valle	8,70 (15)	8,75 (12)	8,72 (13)
Tolima	8,40 (18)	8,30 (13)	8,35 (14)
Bogotá	8,90 (11)	4,42^{1} (14)	6,66 (15)
Bolívar	9,10 (8)		
Risaralda	8,97 (10)		
Santander	8,73 (14)		
Nariño	8,47 (16)		
Norte de Santander	8,45 (17)		
Huila	8,27 (19)		
Caquetá	8,17 (20)		
Guajira	7,97 (21)		

*These are just the judges scores, they are not the official scores because Colombian viewers votes haven't been taken yet at that time.
1 There was a confusion about Miss Bogota D.C. scores, there were two 0.00 that made her score get lower.

== Specials Awards ==
Award	Winner
Best Regional Costume (Mejor Traje Artesanal)	Bogotá - Paula Clavijo
Miss Congeanilaty (Mejor Compañera)	Valle - Dayana Julieth Guerrero Mora
Miss Photogenic (Señorita Fotogenica)	Atlántico - Maria Camila Soleibe
Best Body (Figura Bodytech)	Antioquia - Alejandra Ochoa
Queen of the Police (Reina de la Policía)	Cesar - Yudi Daniela Herrera
Miss Elegance (Señorita Elegancia Primatela)	Meta - Ana María Landaeta
Zapatilla Real	Bucaramanga - Ashley Ordóñez Arévalo
Miss Punctuality (Miss Puntualidad)	Meta - Ana María Landaeta
Cooking Contest (Reto Oster)	Nariño - Leydi Carolina Carvajal

== Delegates ==
23 delegates have been selected to compete.

Department / District	Name	Age	Height	Hometown
Antioquia	Alejandra Ochoa López	22	176 cm (5 ft 9 1/2 in)	Ebéjico
Atlántico	Maria Camila Soleibe Alarcon	18	176 cm (5 ft 9 1/2 in)	Barranquilla
Bogotá D.C.	Paula Milena Clavijo	20	180 cm (5 ft 11 in)	Bogotá
Bolívar	Franselys Santoya Ariza	22	180 cm (5 ft 11 in)	Cartagena
Bucaramanga A.M.	Ashley Ordóñez Arévalo	18	178 cm (5 ft 10 in)	Bucaramanga
Buenaventura D.E.	Carmen Ibeth Alomía Prado	26	171 cm (5 ft 7 1/2 in)	Buenaventura
Caquetá	Luisa Fernanda Duarte Arcos	26	167 cm (5 ft 5 1/2 in)	Pereira
Cartagena, D.T. and C.	Madelein López Camelo	25	178 cm (5 ft 10 in)	Cartagena
Cesar	Yudi Daniela Herrera Avendaño	20	177 cm (5 ft 9 1/2 in)	Río de Oro
Chocó	Jealisse Andrea Tovar Velásquez	20	178 cm (5 ft 10 in)	Quibdó
Guajira	Verónica Pimienta Pereira	25	170 cm (5 ft 7 in)	Uribia
Huila	Betty del Mar Aldana Vanegas	23	173 cm (5 ft 8 in)	Brussels
Magdalena	Valentina Castro López	22	178 cm (5 ft 10 in)	Valledupar
Meta	Ana María Landaeta Gordillo	22	180 cm (5 ft 11 in)	Villavicencio
Nariño	Leydi Carolina Carvajal	25	172 cm (5 ft 7 1/2 in)	Buga
Norte de Santander	Carolina Gene Bedoya	20	168 cm (5 ft 6 in)	Cúcuta
Quindío	Valentina Agudelo Hernández	21	173 cm (5 ft 8 in)	Armenia
Risaralda	Daniela Castillo Villada	23	174 cm (5 ft 8 1/2 in)	Pereira
San Andrés, P. and S.C.	Josseidy Mileidy Escalona Bent	21	180 cm (5 ft 11 in)	San Andrés
Santander	Esthefanía Dignora Prieto Quiroga	23	179 cm (5 ft 10 1/2 in)	Bucaramanga
Sucre	Paula Andrea Correa Ochoa	23	170 cm (5 ft 7 in)	Sincelejo
Tolima	Dahian Lorena Muñoz Quiñones	22	175 cm (5 ft 9 in)	Ibagué
Valle	Dayana Julieth Guerrero Mora	22	171 cm (5 ft 7 1/2 in)	Cali
