= Quibdó =

Capital city of Choco Department, Colombia

- Municipality and town
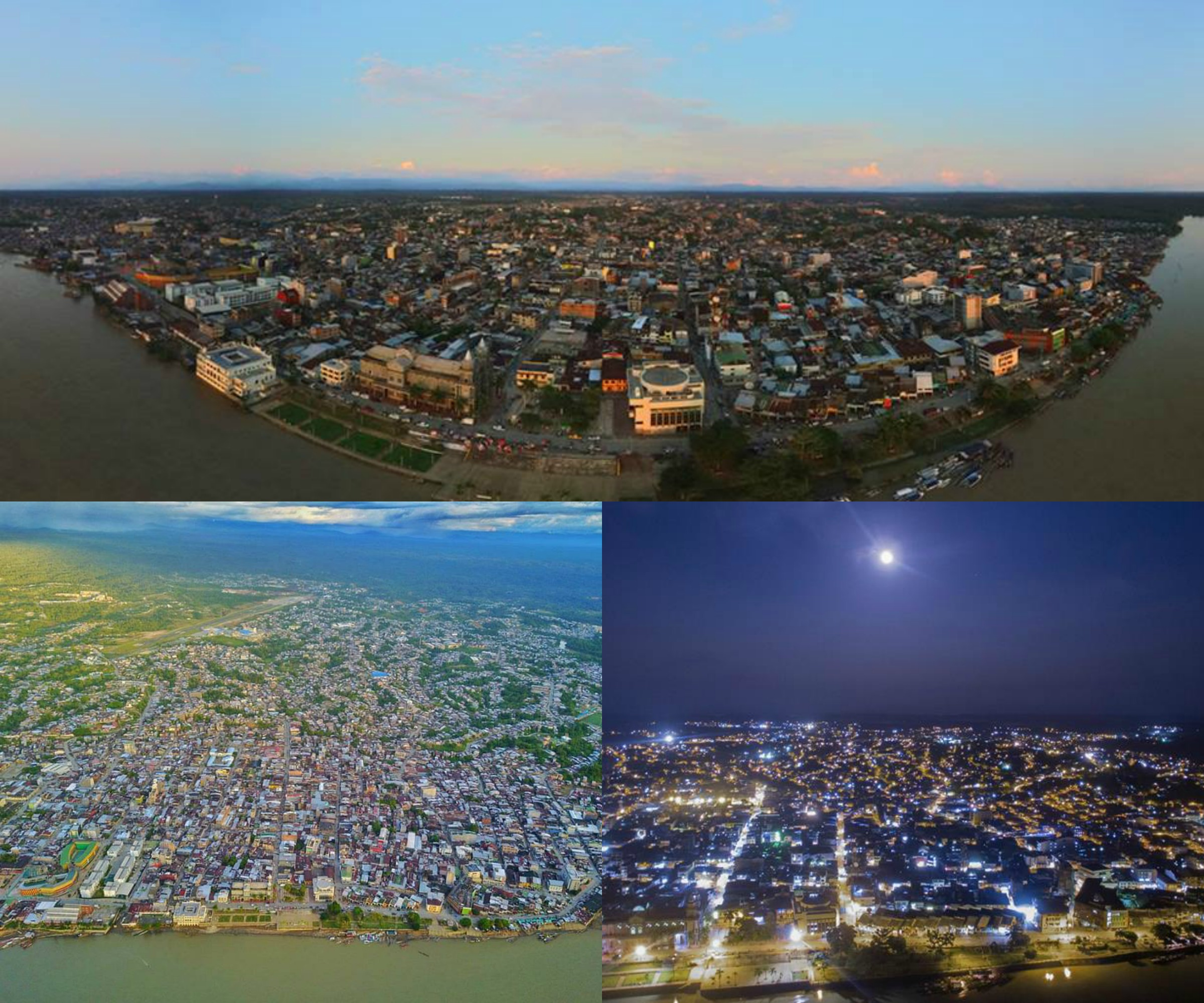
- Aerial views

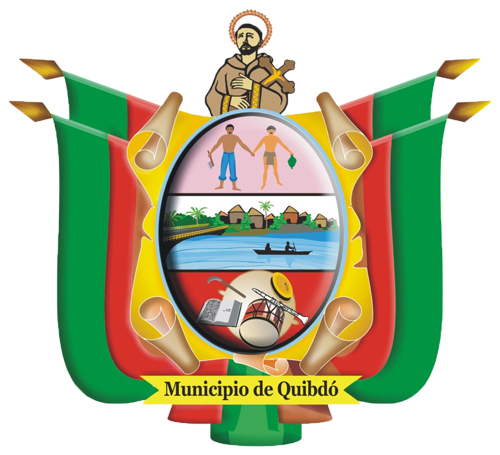
- Flag Coat of arms

- Location in Colombia
- Coordinates: 5°41′32″N 76°39′29″W
- Country: Colombia
- Region: Pacific Region
- Department: Chocó Department
- Founded: 1648

Government
  - Mayor: Rafael Bolaños Pino (2024 - 2027)

Area
  - Municipality and town: 3,507 km^{2} (1,354 sq mi)
  - Urban: 28.71 km^{2} (11.08 sq mi)
- Elevation: 43 m (141 ft)

Population (2018 census)
  - Municipality and town: 129,237
  - Density: 36.85/km^{2} (95.44/sq mi)
  - Urban: 113,124
  - Urban density: 3,940/km^{2} (10,210/sq mi)
- Time zone: UTC-05 (Colombia Standard Time)
- Area code: 57 + 4
- Website: Official website (in Spanish)

Quibdó (Spanish pronunciation: [kiβˈðo]) is the capital city of Chocó Department, in the Pacific Region of Colombia. Located on the Atrato River, the municipality of Quibdó has an area of 3,507 square kilometres (1,354 sq mi) and a population of 129,237, predominantly Afro Colombian, including Zambo Colombians.

== History ==
In prehistoric times, the Chocó rainforest and mountains constituted a major barrier dividing the Mesoamerican and Andean civilizations. The high rainfall and the extremely humid climate did not attract the Spanish colonists. The Emberá people ceded much of their territory to the Spanish Franciscan order in 1648. Subsequent attacks on colonial outposts by hostile tribes discouraged attempts at settlement. Six years later, the Spanish began again to colonize the region, eventually establishing some lumber camps and plantations where they used enslaved Africans as workers.

It was not until the nineteenth century when there was interest in finding a shipping route between the Atlantic and Pacific Oceans to avoid traveling via the Straits of Magellan that the Chocó region again became of significant interest to European colonial powers, as the Atrato River Valley was thought the best possibility for this purpose by the explorer Alexander von Humboldt; however this idea was eventually shelved in favor of the Panama Canal. At the same time that research on using the Chocó to connect the Pacific and Atlantic was being carried out, gold and platinum were discovered in the Atrato Valley and this ensured Quibdó's growth and status as the chief town in the region.

Another crucial development at this time was the migration of freed black slaves into the Chocó; they were primarily working in shifting cultivation to cope with the extreme leaching from the super-humid climate. They also fished and harvested forest products.

The 1853 watercolors by Manuel María Paz document two mestizo or European men with an Afro-Colombian street vendor, and depict the dress of Afro-Colombian and European women in the town square.

The Afro-Colombian communities established trade with highland cities such as Medellín via rough mule trails that were used until the 1950s. A combination of population growth and declining values for the region's natural resources gradually resulted in an economic downturn for the region and especially Quibdó.

== Climate ==
Quibdó has an extremely wet and cloudy tropical rainforest climate (Köppen Af) without noticeable seasons. It has the highest amount of rainfall in South America of any city of its size or greater. A comparable high-rainfall city of larger size, Monrovia in Liberia, receives 3,050 millimetres (120 in) less rain annually than Quibdó. The extreme rainfall occurs because the Andes, to the east of the city, block the westerly winds driven by the Intertropical Convergence Zone. Throughout the year, owing to the Humboldt Current off the West coast of South America, these winds remain centered in the north of the continent at Quibdó’s longitudes. The result is that the extremely unstable, ascending air from the Intertropical Convergence Zone is consistently forced to rise over the Chocó plain; as it cools, enormous quantities of moisture precipitate as rainfall. What is more, due to the exuberant nature and biodiversity in the region, a biotic pump phenomena causes the Chocó low-level-jet, another important factor in driving atmospheric moisture from the Pacific into the Colombian Andes.

Rain falls almost every day from clouds in intense thunderstorms; the region has a wet season year round. Some 309 days (84%) of the year are rainy. Sunny periods seldom last more than a few hours after sunrise. Quibdó has only 1,276 hours of sunshine annually, and it ranks as one of the cloudiest cities in the world. Its sunniest month is July, with typically a total of 135 hours of sunshine for the entire month.

Climate data for Quibdó (Aeropuerto El Caraño), 1991-2020 normals
Month	Jan	Feb	Mar	Apr	May	Jun	Jul	Aug	Sep	Oct	Nov	Dec	Year
Record high °C (°F)	36.6 (97.9)	35.0 (95.0)	35.4 (95.7)	37.0 (98.6)	35.0 (95.0)	38.0 (100.4)	36.8 (98.2)	35.4 (95.7)	35.0 (95.0)	34.8 (94.6)	35.4 (95.7)	34.6 (94.3)	38.0 (100.4)
Mean daily maximum °C (°F)	30.0 (86.0)	30.3 (86.5)	30.5 (86.9)	30.9 (87.6)	31.1 (88.0)	31.0 (87.8)	31.1 (88.0)	31.2 (88.2)	30.9 (87.6)	30.6 (87.1)	30.2 (86.4)	29.8 (85.6)	30.6 (87.1)
Daily mean °C (°F)	26.8 (80.2)	27.1 (80.8)	27.2 (81.0)	27.2 (81.0)	27.1 (80.8)	26.9 (80.4)	27.0 (80.6)	27.0 (80.6)	26.7 (80.1)	26.4 (79.5)	26.2 (79.2)	26.4 (79.5)	26.8 (80.2)
Mean daily minimum °C (°F)	23.5 (74.3)	23.6 (74.5)	23.6 (74.5)	23.7 (74.7)	23.6 (74.5)	23.4 (74.1)	23.2 (73.8)	23.2 (73.8)	23.2 (73.8)	23.2 (73.8)	23.2 (73.8)	23.4 (74.1)	23.4 (74.1)
Record low °C (°F)	19.0 (66.2)	21.0 (69.8)	20.8 (69.4)	20.0 (68.0)	20.0 (68.0)	19.0 (66.2)	19.8 (67.6)	19.6 (67.3)	20.0 (68.0)	18.0 (64.4)	20.0 (68.0)	20.0 (68.0)	18.0 (64.4)
Average precipitation mm (inches)	569.8 (22.43)	487.3 (19.19)	538.8 (21.21)	652.9 (25.70)	785.1 (30.91)	774.8 (30.50)	851.7 (33.53)	867.4 (34.15)	698.4 (27.50)	588.4 (23.17)	662.3 (26.07)	680.0 (26.77)	8,156.9 (321.14)
Average precipitation days (≥ 1.0 mm)	22.2	19.1	21.3	24.0	25.1	24.0	25.1	26.3	25.2	24.5	24.6	25.5	286.9
Average relative humidity (%)	87	85	85	86	86	86	85	85	86	87	87	88	86
Mean monthly sunshine hours	90.5	83.4	85.6	92.9	112.5	114.0	135.1	132.7	112.7	116.7	112.2	88.1	1,276.4
Source 1: Instituto de Hidrologia Meteorologia y Estudios Ambientales
Source 2: INSTITUTO DE HIDROLOGIA METEOROLOGIA Y ESTUDIOS AMBIENTALES (sunshine and humidity 1981-2010)

== Transportation ==
Quibdó is served by El Caraño Airport with flights by three commercial airlines.

== Notable residents ==
- Vanessa Mendoza (b. 1981), politician and first black Miss Colombia
- Jackson Martínez (b. 1986), former professional footballer who played as a striker
- Elvis Rivas (b. 1987), footballer
- Wbeymar Angulo (b. 1992), professional footballer who plays for the Armenia national football team
- Andrea Tovar (b. 1993), Model and Miss Colombia 2015‑2016
- Edwin Mosquera (b. 2001), professional footballer who plays for Atlanta United
- Daniel Mosquera (b. 1999), professional footballer who plays for Hellas Verona

== Gallery ==
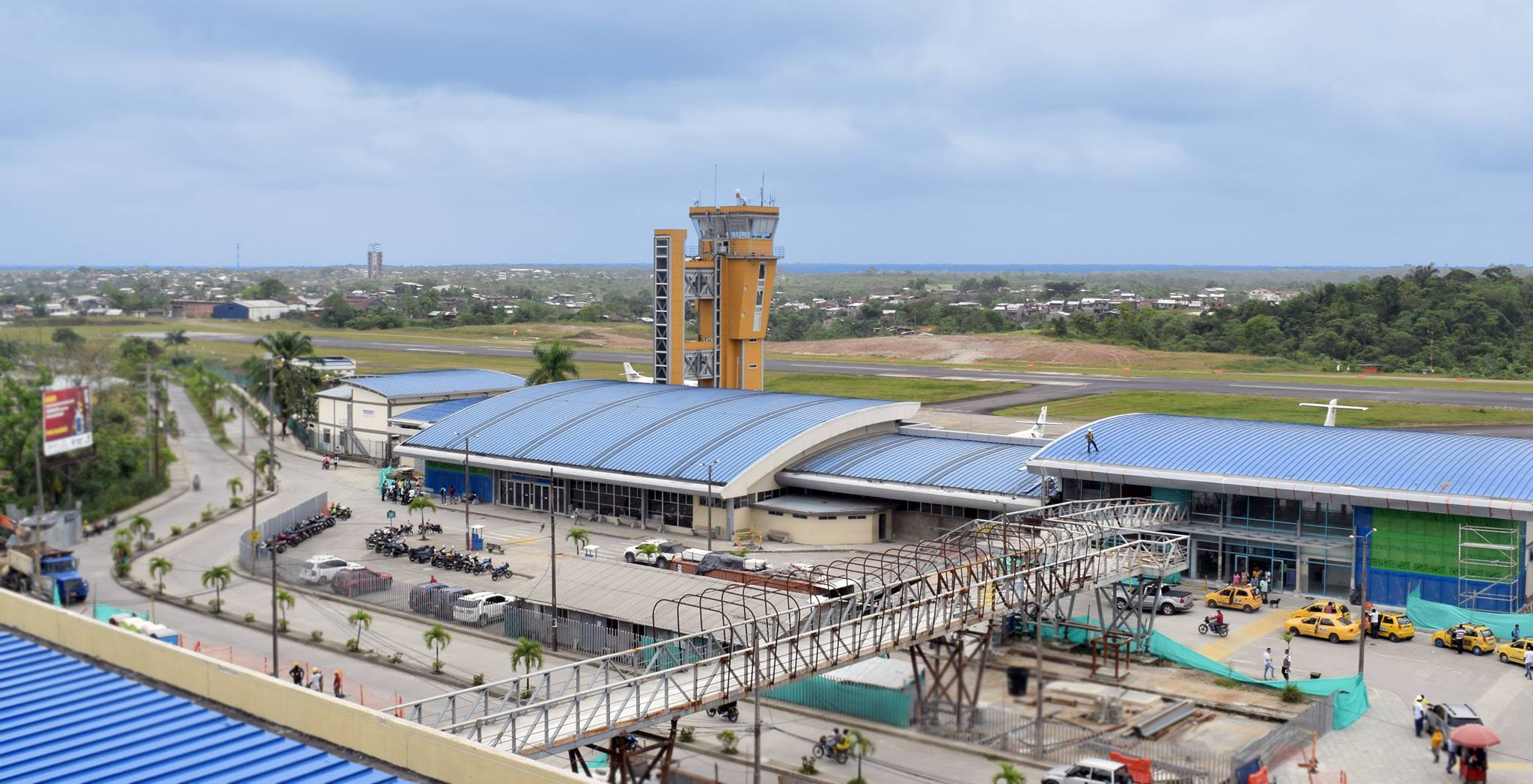
El Caraño Airport

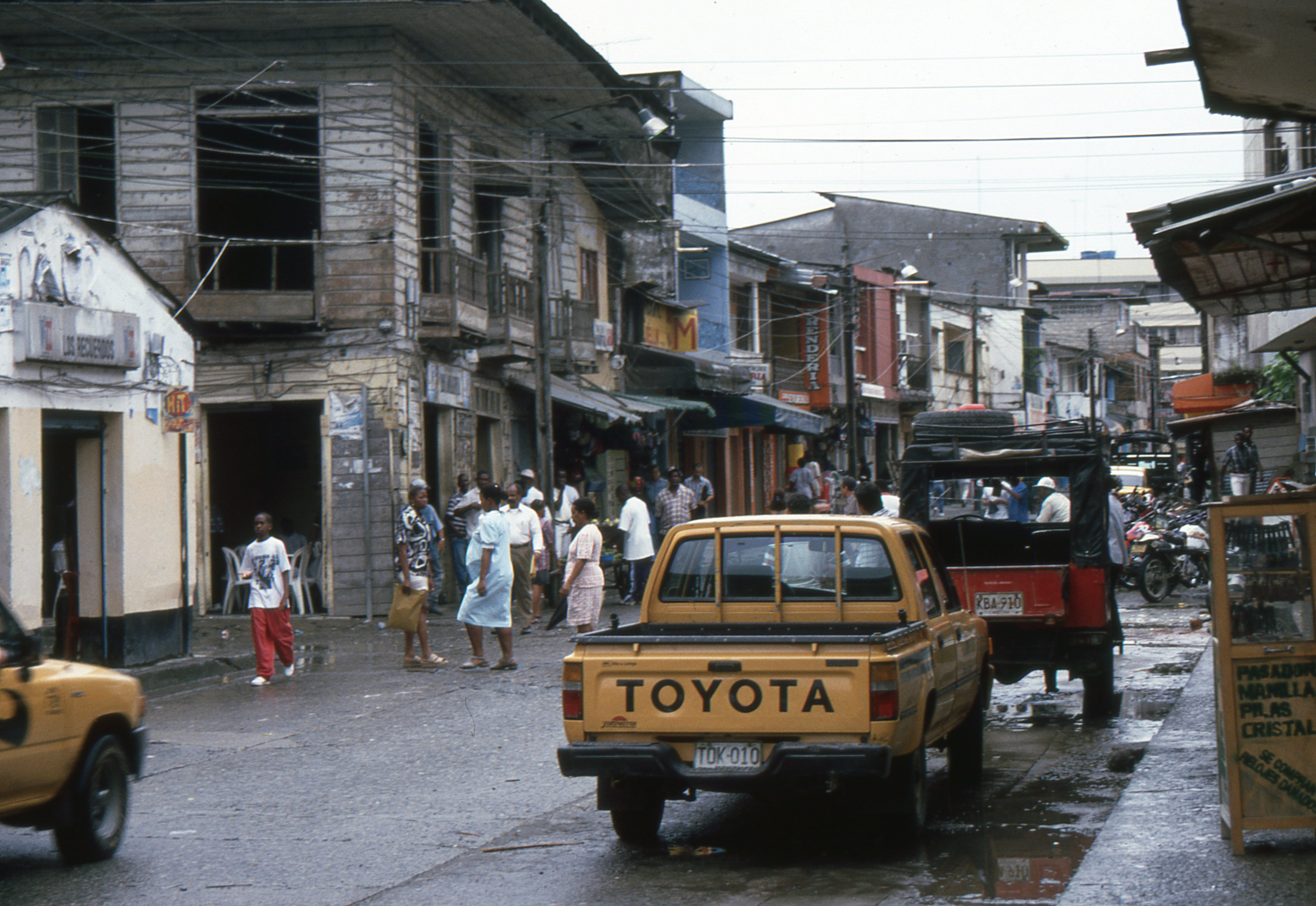
Street in Quibdó

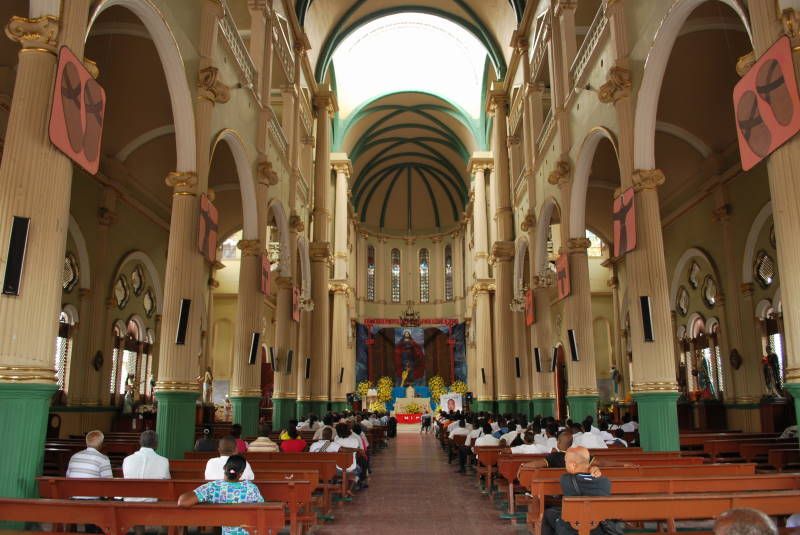
Cathedral of St. Francis of Assisi

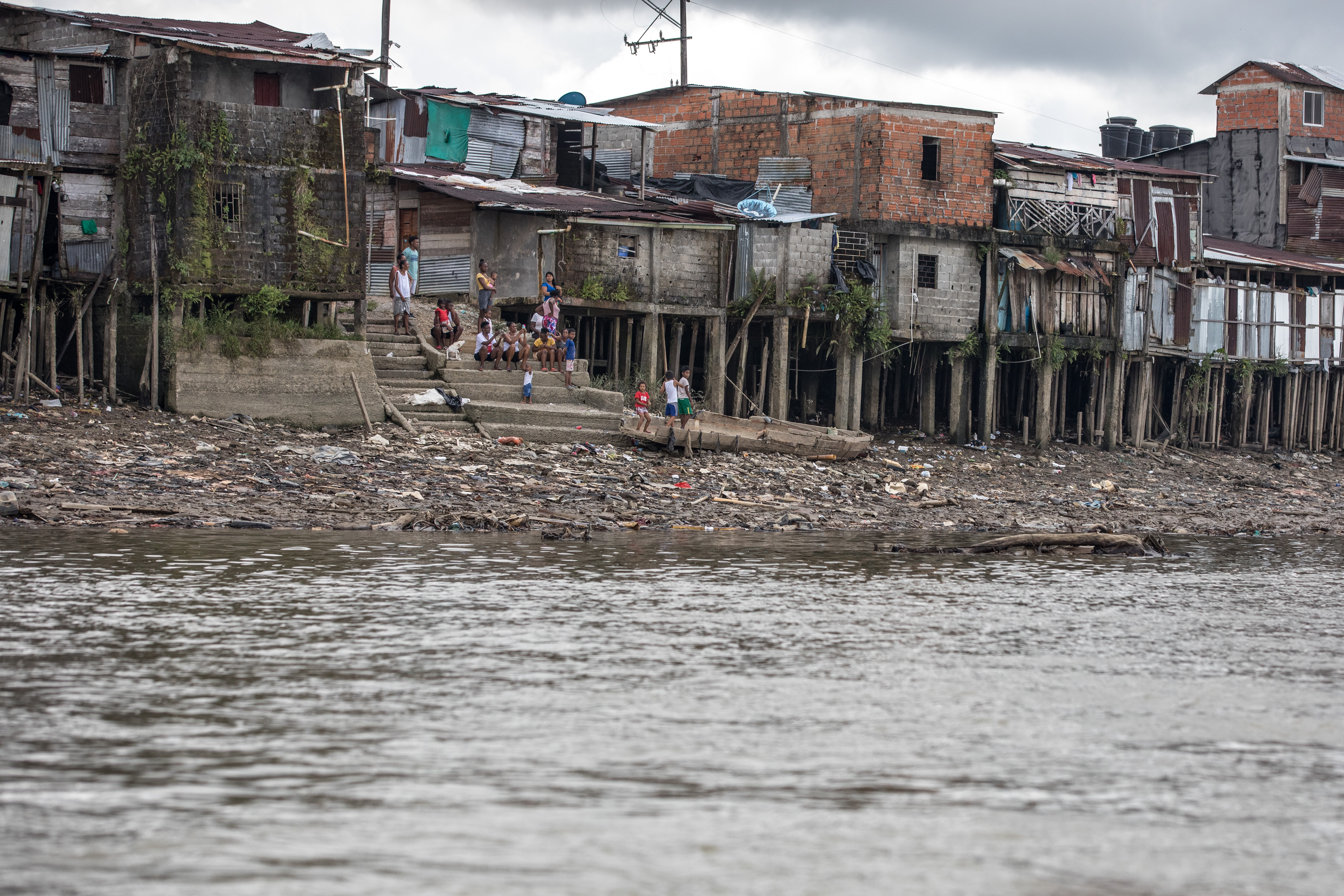
Stilt houses in Quibdó

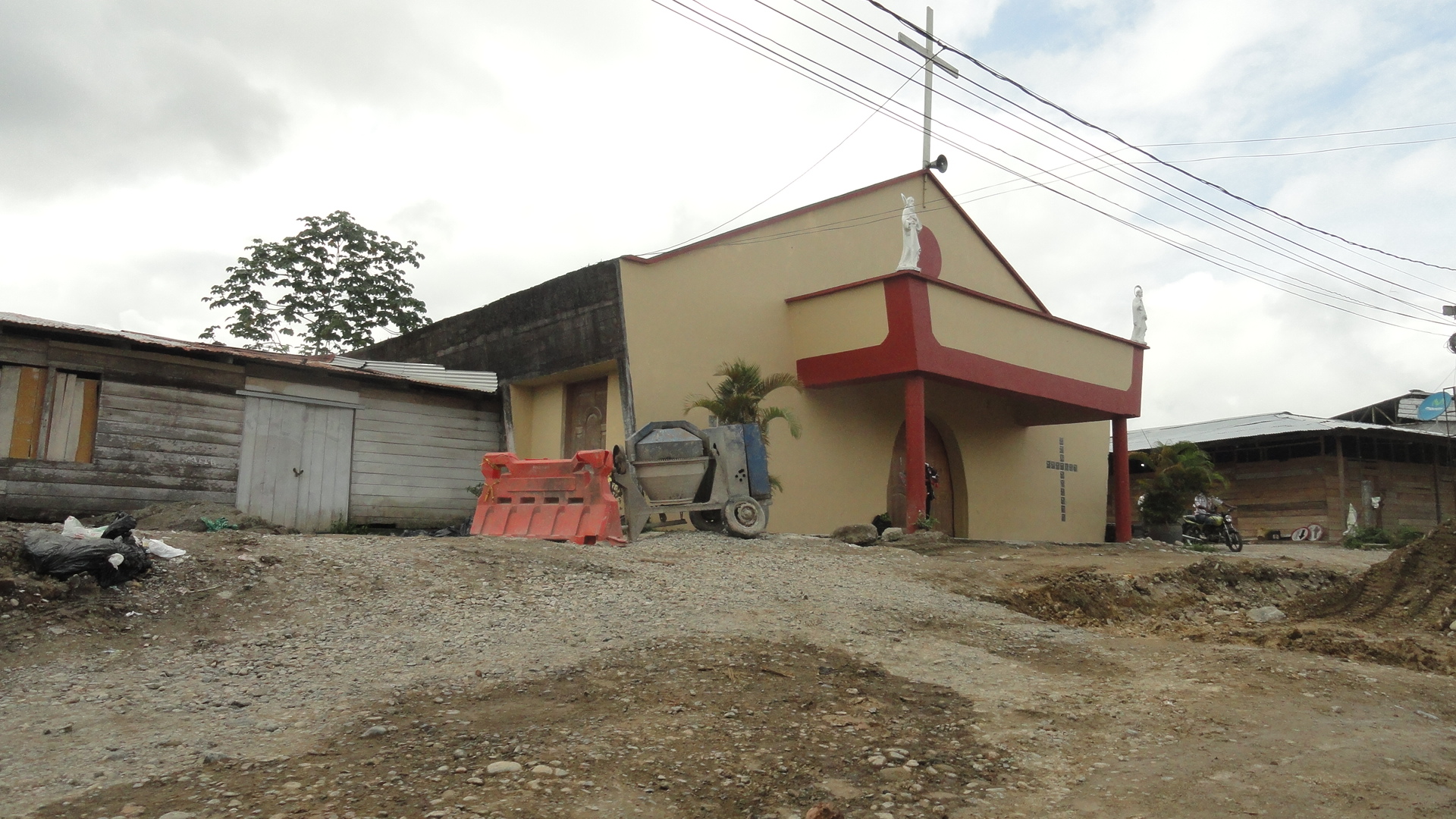
Santa Cruz church

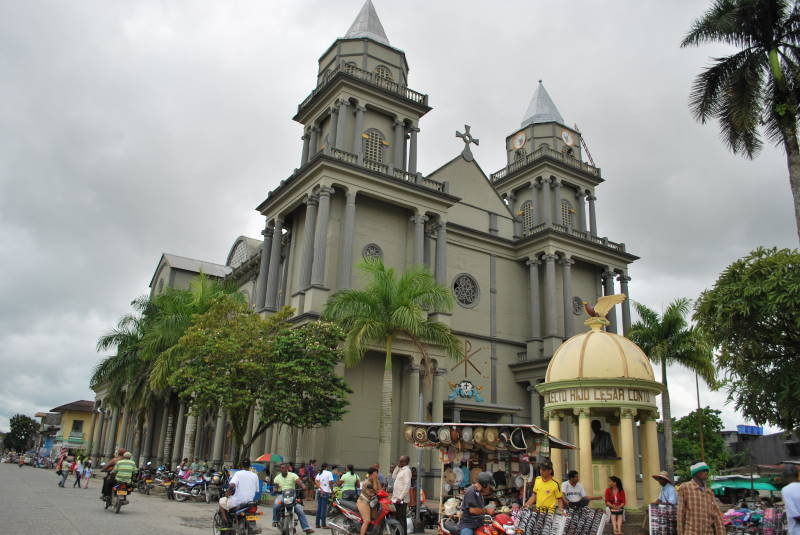

== See also ==
- Wettest places on Earth
- Cherrapunji
- Big Bog, Maui
- Lloró
