= Camila Avella =

Colombian beauty pageant titleholder (born 1995)

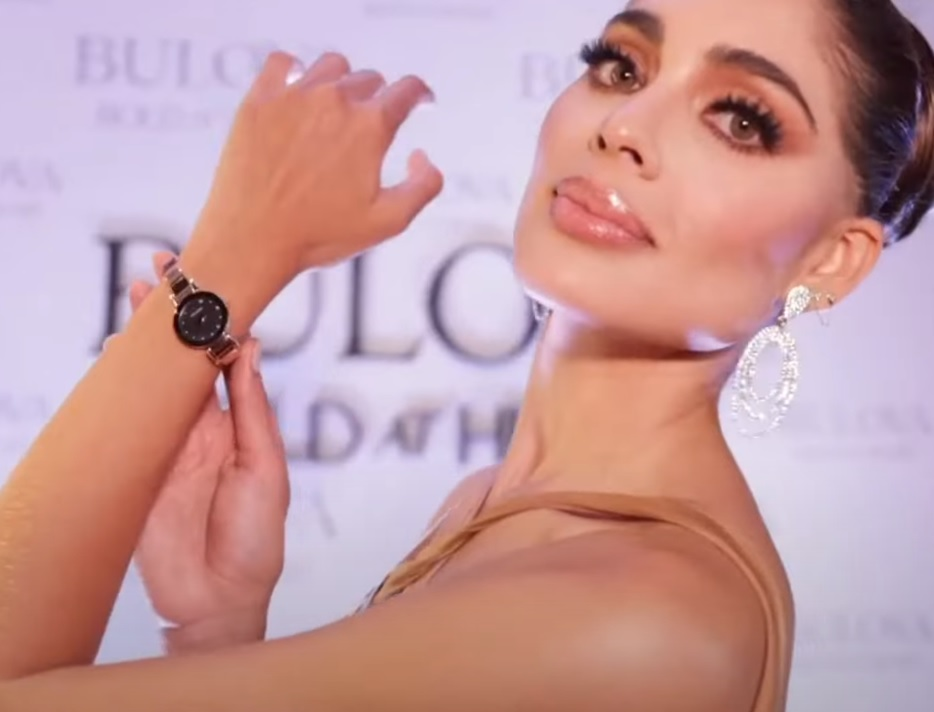
- Born: María Camila Avella Montañez; 26 June 1995 (age 31); Yopal, Casanare, Colombia
- Education: Universidad Nacional Abierta y a Distancia (UNAD)
- Spouse: Nassif Kamle (m. 2020)
- Children: 1
- Beauty pageant titleholder
- Title: Miss Universe Casanare 2023; Miss Universe Colombia 2023
- Major competitions: Miss Universe Colombia 2023; (Winner); Miss Universe 2023; (Top 5)

María Camila Avella Montañez (born June 26, 1995) is a Colombian beauty pageant titleholder who won Miss Universe Colombia 2023. She was the first representative from Casanare to win Miss Universe Colombia. She represented Colombia at Miss Universe 2023 and reached the top five.

== Personal life ==
María Camila Avella Montañez was born June 26, 1995 in Yopal, Casanare, Colombia. She is the only child of Martha Cecilia Montañez and electrical engineer Reynaldo Avella. From the age of 10, she played field tennis, and represented Casanare in at national and international tournaments. She attended high school at Centro Social La Presentación at her hometown and later studied social communication at Universidad Nacional Abierta y a Distancia (UNAD).

== Pageantry ==
=== Señorita Casanare 2018 ===
In 2018, Avella was announced as the representative of the Casanare Department for Señorita Colombia 2018, which would take place in November of the same year in Cartagena. However, the contest's board of directors, cancelled her participation, alleging that Avella had a manager and had professional photographs of her contrary to the contest regulations. Despite her efforts she did compete in the event.

=== Miss Universe Colombia 2023 ===
Avella won the competition, on September 2, 2023 in Barranquilla, Atlántico. She was the first winner from Casanare, and also the first married woman and mother to win Miss Universe Colombia.

=== Miss Universe 2023 ===
Avella represented Colombia at Miss Universe 2023 on November 18, 2023 in San Salvador, El Salvador where she reached the top five. She was also the first married woman and mother to reach the top five of Miss Universe.

Awards and achievements
Preceded by Gabriëla Dos Santos; Ashley Cariño (Top 5)	Miss Universe Top 5 Finalist (with Karla Guilfú); 2023	Succeeded by Suchata Chuangsri (3rd Runner-Up); Ileana Márquez (4th Runner-Up)
Preceded by María Fernanda Aristizábal; Quindío	Miss Universe Colombia; 2023	Succeeded by Daniela Toloza; Valle
Preceded by Hilsse Barrios Torres	Miss Universe Casanare; 2023	Succeeded by María José Villegas
