= Daniela Toloza =

Colombian beauty pageant titleholder (born 1994)

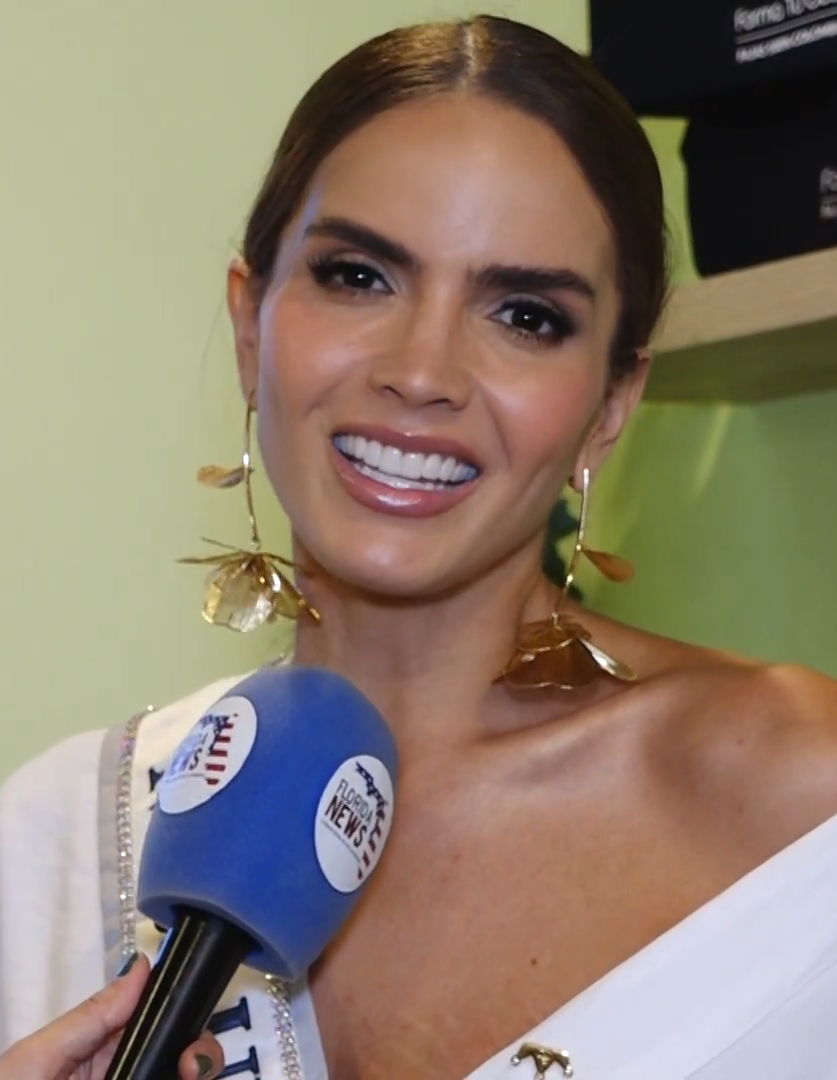
- Toloza in 2024
- Born: Daniela Rebeca Toloza Rocha; February 25, 1994 (age 32); Cali, Valle del Cauca, Colombia
- Education: Universidad del Rosario
- Beauty pageant titleholder
- Title: Miss Universe Colombia 2024
- Major competitions: Miss Universe Colombia 2024; (Winner); Miss Universe 2024; (Unplaced)

Daniela Rebeca Toloza Rocha (born February 25, 1994, in Cali, Valle del Cauca, Colombia) is a Colombian model and beauty pageant titleholder who won Miss Universe Colombia 2024. She represented Colombia at Miss Universe 2024 in México City, México and was unplaced.

== Early life ==
Daniela Rebeca Toloza Rocha was born February 25, 1994 in Cali, Valle del Cauca, Colombia. During her childhood and youth, she had to face a difficult process of self-improvement after reaching a body weight of 106 kg, after having lost her father during the Colombian conflict when she was 10 years old.

Toloza is a costume designer, specialist in senior management, advertising and public relations. In addition to Spanish, she speaks fluent English.

== Pageantry ==
=== Miss Universe Valle 2024 ===
On April 13, 2024, Toloza won Miss Universe Valle 2024.

=== Miss Universe Colombia 2024 ===
Toloza won Miss Universe Colombia 2024, at the Centro de Eventos del Caribe Puerta de Oro, on June 2, 2024. She was crowned by her predecessor Camila Avella. At the preliminary challenges in Barranquilla, Toloza won three awards, Miss Forma Tu Cuerpo, Mejor Rostro y Miss Bulova Time.

=== Miss Universe 2024 ===
Toloza represented Colombia at Miss Universe 2024 in Mexico, and was unplaced, ending a five year streak for Colombia at Miss Universe.

Awards and achievements
Preceded by Camila Avella; Casanare	Miss Universe Colombia; 2024	Succeeded by Vanessa Pulgarin; Antioquia
Preceded by Valentina Cardona; Valle del Cauca	Miss Universe Valle; 2024	Succeeded by Eliana Duque; Valle del Cauca
