= Miss Universe Colombia 2023 =

4rd Miss Universe Colombia pageant

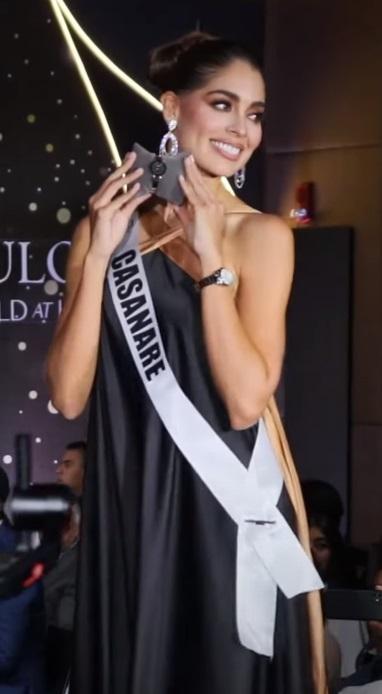
- Camila Avella
- Date: September 2, 2023
- Presenters: Valeria Ayos; Carlos Claro; Renzy Konper
- Entertainment: Barranquilla's Carnival; Natalia de Castro; Valeria Charris; Giblack Music; Checo Acosta; Noel Schajris
- Venue: Puerta de Oro Centro de Eventos del Caribe, Barranquilla, Colombia
- Broadcaster: RCN Televisión
- Entrants: 24
- Placements: 15
- Debuts: Guainía; Medellín; Soledad
- Withdrawals: Bolívar; Caquetá; Cartagena; Chocó; Córdoba; Huila; Meta; Sucre
- Returns: Amazonas; Cauca; Cesar; Nariño; Putumayo
- Winner: María Camila Avella; Casanare

Miss Universe Colombia 2023 was the fourth Miss Universe Colombia pageant, held at the Puerta de Oro Centro de Eventos del Caribe in Barranquilla, Colombia, on September 2, 2023.

María Fernanda Aristizábal Urrea of Quindio crowned María Camila Avella Montañez of Casanare as her successor at the end of the event. She represented Colombia at the Miss Universe 2023 competition in San Salvador, El Salvador and placed Top 5.

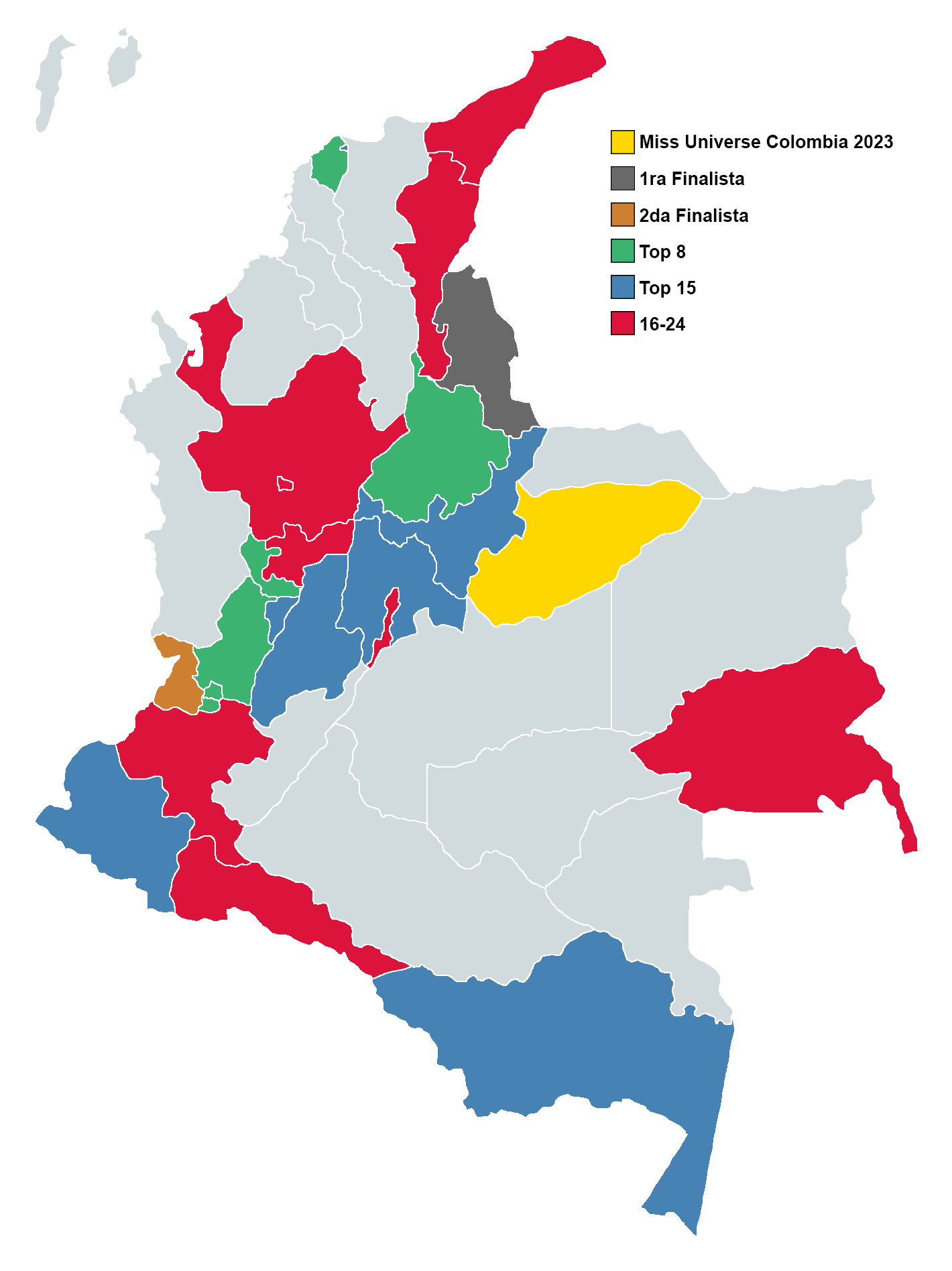
Official results

== Results ==
=== Placements ===
Placement	Contestant
Miss Universe Colombia 2023	Casanare – María Camila Avella
1st Runner-Up	Norte de Santander – Adriana Catalina Numa
2nd Runner-Up	Buenaventura – Lina María Hurtado
Top 8	Atlántico – Sophia Isabel Koepke; Cali – Wendy Michelle Murillo; Risaralda – Valentina Valderrama *; Santander – Nina María Pinzón *; Valle – Valentina Cardona
Top 15	Amazonas – María Paula Torres; Boyacá – Laura Valentina Parra; Cundinamarca – Sherren Londoño; Nariño – Rouse Valentina Cortés *; Quindío – Jazmín Eliana Arenas; Soledad – Marleidys Morales; Tolima – Dany Yohana Sierra

* – Voted into the Top 15 by viewers

== Contestants ==
24 contestants competed for the title.

Department/City	Delegate	Age (Note: Ages at the time of the pageant)
Amazonas	María Paula Torres Penagos	25
Antioquia	Luisa Fernanda Urrea Henao	21
Atlántico	Sophia Isabel Koepke Julio	23
Bogotá	Daniela Aristizábal Salazar	25
Boyacá	Laura Valentina Parra Giraldo	22
Buenaventura	Lina María Hurtado Mosquera	24
Caldas	Valeria Gallego Salazar	24
Cali	Wendy Michelle Murillo Murillo	25
Casanare	María Camila Avella Montanchez	27
Cauca	Lizeth Mayesti Sinisterra Ramírez	24
Cesar	María Juliana Pardo Mejía	25
Cundinamarca	Sherren Londoño Perea	21
Guainía	Luisa María Lozano Lozano	27
La Guajira	Mayderlyng Stephanie Carruyo Rojas	24
Medellín	Valeria Giraldo Toro	23
Nariño	Rouse Valentina Cortés Betancourt	24
Norte de Santander	Adriana Catalina Numa Vega	24
Putumayo	Darling Maryuri Valencia Cortés	24
Quindío	Jazmín Eliana Arenas Usma	26
Risaralda	Valentina Valderrama Patiño	26
Santander	Nina María Pinzón Zambrano	26
Soledad	Marleidys Morales Pérez	27
Tolima	Dany Yohana Sierra Pastrana	24
Valle	Valentina Cardona Rincón	23

== Judges ==
- (Philippines) Jason Co
- (Curaçao) Aysjel Bernadette
- (Colombia) Cesar Velilla
- (Colombia) Tatyana Orozco
- (Mexico) Andrea Meza – Miss Universe 2020
