= Laura González (Miss Colombia) =

Colombian actress and model (born 1995)

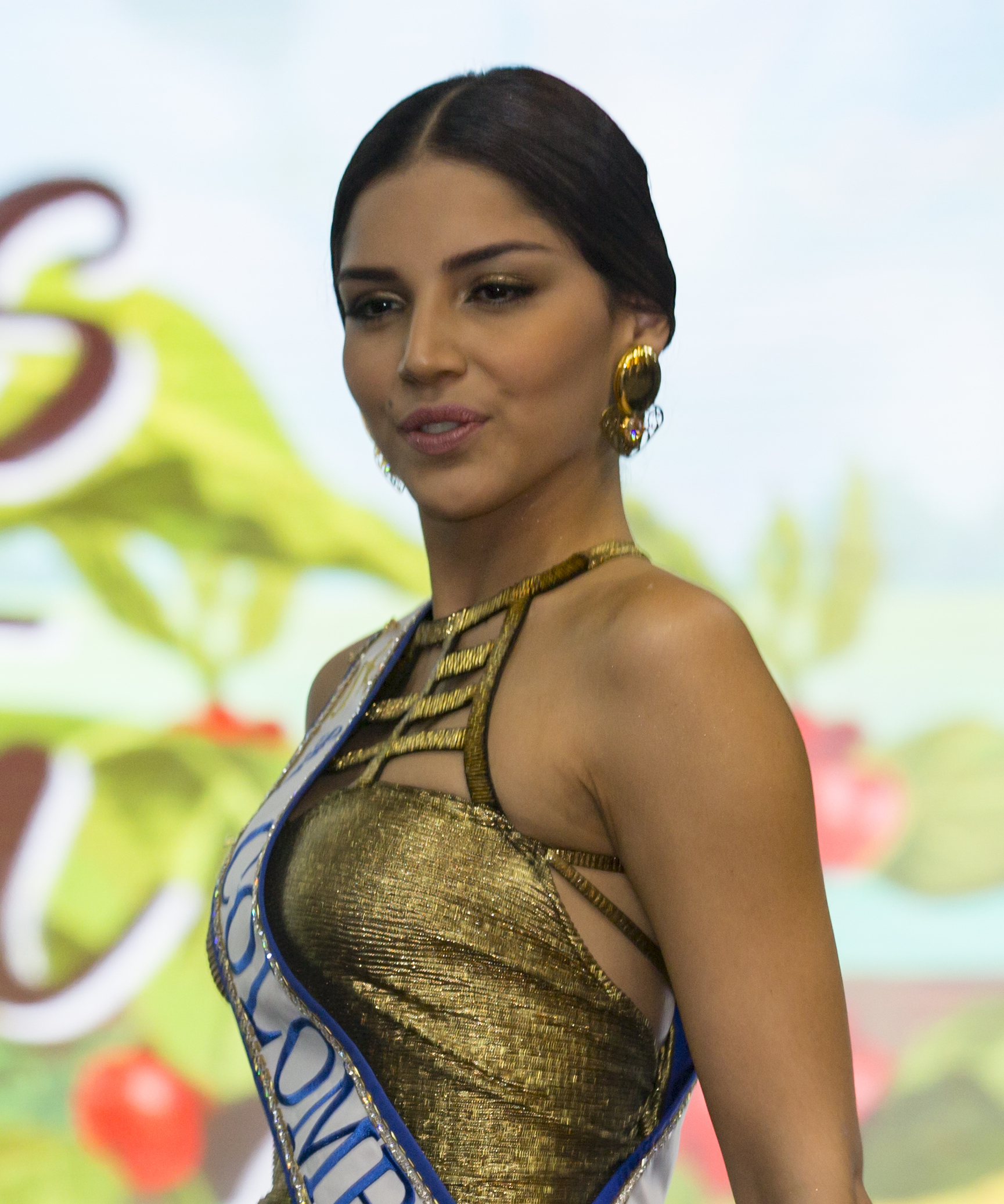
- Miss Colombia 2017, Laura González
- Born: Laura González Ospina; 22 February 1995 (age 31); Cali, Valle del Cauca, Colombia
- Other name: Laura Barjum
- Occupations: Actress, model
- Height: 1.78 m (5 ft 10 in)
- Beauty pageant titleholder
- Title: Miss Cartagena 2016; Miss Colombia 2016
- Years active: 2015–present
- Hair color: Brown
- Eye color: Brown
- Major competitions: Miss Colombia 2016 (Winner); Miss Universe 2017 (1st Runner-Up)

Laura González Ospina (born 22 February 1995), also known as Laura Barjum, is a Colombian actress, model and beauty pageant titleholder. She was Miss Colombia 2017 and later represented her country at the Miss Universe 2017 pageant, where she finished as 1st Runner-Up.

== Personal life ==
González was born in Cali but moved to Cartagena when she was six months old. She is of Lebanese descent. She attended high school in Cartagena Modern Gymnasium and Dramatic Art at the School of Education Actoral House Ensemble. She speaks Spanish, English and French.

== Pageantry ==
On 20 March 2017, González was crowned Miss Colombia 2017. She then represented Colombia at Miss Universe 2017, where she finished as the 1st Runner-up. This marked the fourth year in a row that the delegate from Colombia placed in the pageant's Top 3.

== Filmography ==
González participated in the telenovelas La Cacica, playing Chechi, and also the 2025 remake of Newly Rich, Newly Poor, playing Fernanda, and has also been featured in several films.

=== Television ===
Year	Title	Role
2017	La Cacica	Chechi
2024	Klass95: El poder de la Belleza	Vanessa
2025	Newly Rich, Newly Poor	Fernanda

Awards and achievements
Preceded by (Haiti) Raquel Pélissier	Miss Universe 1st Runner-up; 2017	Succeeded by (South Africa) Tamaryn Green
Preceded by Andrea Tovar	Miss Colombia; 2017	Succeeded by Gabriela Tafur
Preceded by Andrea Tovar	Miss Universe Colombia; 2017	Succeeded by Valeria Morales
