= Andrea Tovar (beauty pageant titleholder) =

Colombian beauty pageant titleholder

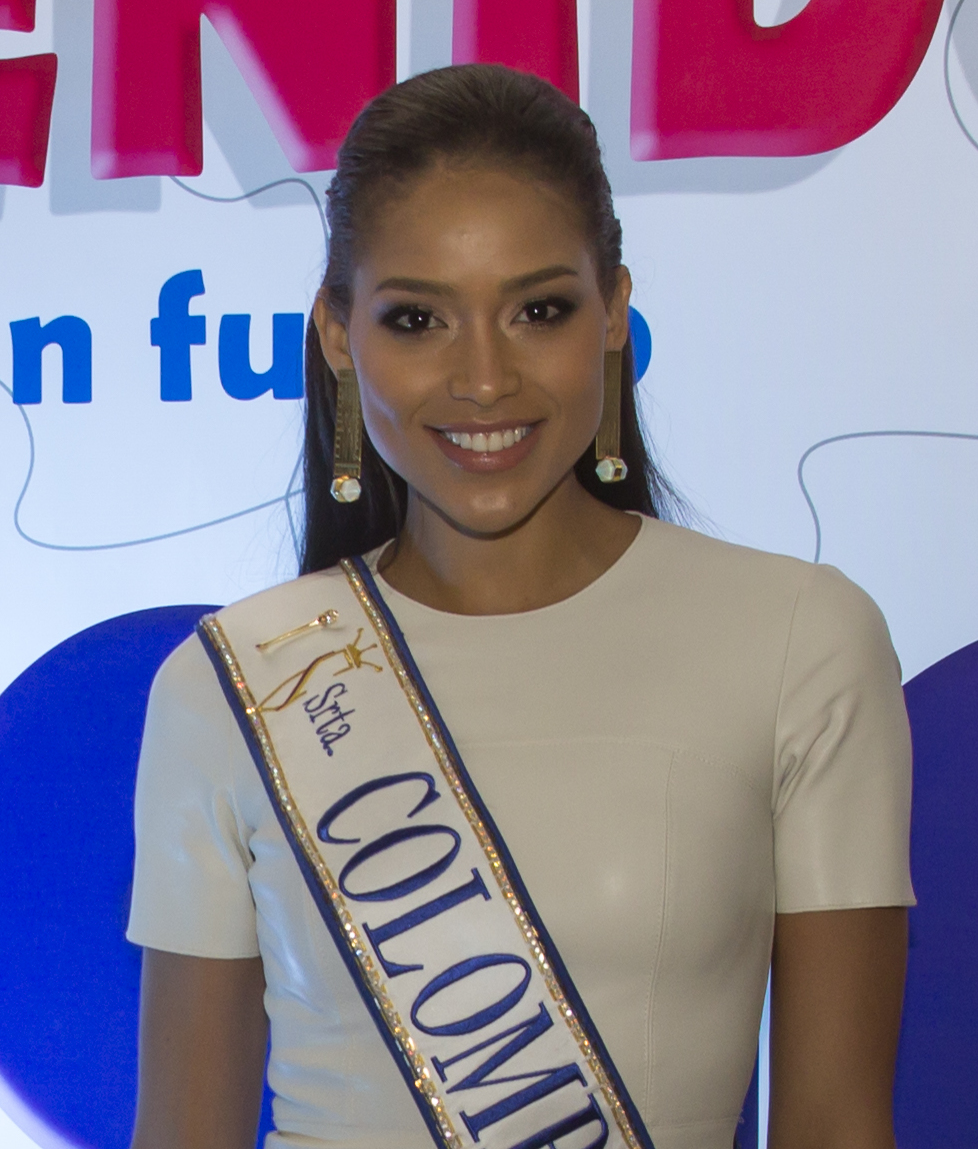
- Tovar in 2016
- Born: Jealisse Andrea Tovar Velásquez; Quibdó, Choco, Colombia
- Height: 1.79 m (5 ft 10 in)
- Beauty pageant titleholder
- Title: Miss Chocó 2015; Miss Colombia 2015
- Hair color: Brown
- Eye color: Brown
- Major competitions: Miss Colombia 2015 (Winner); Miss Universe 2016; (2nd Runner-Up)

Andrea Tovar is a Colombian beauty pageant titleholder who won Miss Colombia 2015, and represented Colombia at Miss Universe 2016, finishing as second runner-up.

== Personal life ==
Jealisse Andrea Tovar Velásquez was born in Quibdó, to Antonio José Tovar Mendoza and Xenia Rosa Velásquez Salguero. In 2015 she was studying Industrial Design and Photographic Image Production at the Jorge Tadeo Lozano University in Bogotá.

=== Miss Colombia 2015 ===
She was crowned Miss Chocó in 2014, but as another contestant, Iliam Fariza Zapata Jensen, was selected in a different pageant to represent the same department, she had to postpone her participation in the national pageant until 2015.

=== Miss Universe 2016 ===
Tovar represented Colombia at Miss Universe 2016, held in the Philippines where she finished second runner-up to Iris Mittenaere of France.

Awards and achievements
Preceded by (United States) Olivia Jordan	Miss Universe 2nd Runner-Up; 2016	Succeeded by (Jamaica) Davina Bennett
Preceded by Ariadna Gutiérrez	Miss Colombia; 2015	Succeeded by Laura González
Preceded by Iliam Zapata	Miss Chocó; 2015	Succeeded by Carmen Serna
