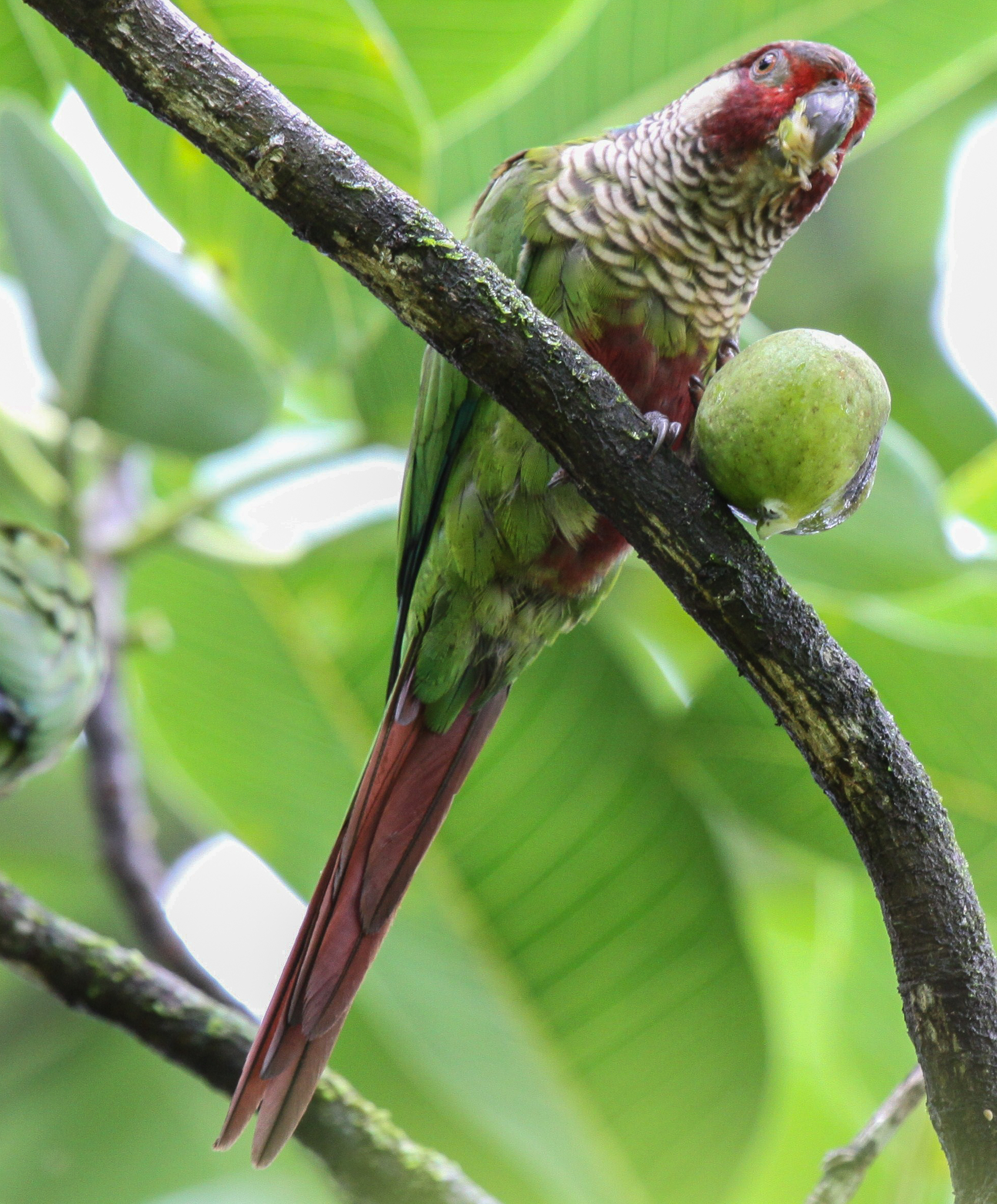
- subspecies eisenmanni

Conservation status
- Critically endangered, possibly extinct (IUCN 3.1)

Scientific classification
- Kingdom: Animalia
- Phylum: Chordata
- Class: Aves
- Order: Psittaciformes
- Family: Psittacidae
- Genus: Pyrrhura
- Species: P. subandina

Binomial name
- Pyrrhura subandina Todd, 1917

= Subandean parakeet =

Species of bird

The Subandean parakeet (Pyrrhura subandina), also known as the Sinú parakeet, is a bird in subfamily Arinae of the family Psittacidae, the African and New World parrots. BirdLife International's Handbook of the Birds of the World recognizes it as a full species. The International Ornithological Committee (IOC), the South American Classification Committee of the American Ornithological Society, and the Clements taxonomy treat it as a subspecies of the painted parakeet (P. picta).

A molecular genetic study published in 2023 found that the Subandean parakeet was sister to the Perija parakeet (Pyrrhura caeruleiceps).

== Subspecies ==
Two subspecies are recognised:

- Azuero parakeet, P. s. eisenmanni Delgado, JA, 1985 – south-central Panama (Azuero Peninsula)
- Sinú parakeet, P. s. subandina Todd, WEC, 1917 – northwestern Colombia (lower Sinú River Valley); unrecorded since 1949 and possibly extinct

The nominate subspecies, P. s. subandina, is only known with certainty from the Sinú Valley in northern Colombia. BirdLife International estimates that if the bird is not already extinct, no more than 50 likely exist. Despite extensive searches, there have been no confirmed records of the parakeet since 1949. Scientists know very little about the Sinú parakeet's reproductive physiology, nutritional needs, ecology, or behavior. There are 18 specimens known from four locations in Colombia, two of which have been deforested. The parakeet is among the 25 "most wanted lost" species that are the focus of Re:wild's "Search for Lost Species" initiative.
