= Miss Grand Colombia =

- Established: 11 February 2018; 8 years ago
- Founder: Neyder Duarte
- Type: Beauty pageant
- Headquarters: Bogotá
- Location: Colombia
- Members: Miss Grand International
- Official language: Spanish
- Directors: Omar Iglesias; Frank Fernandez
- Parent organization: Belleza Colombia International S.A.S.

Miss Grand Colombia
licensees timeline

Stand-alone pageant
Appointed titleholder
No licensee/titleholder

Miss Grand Colombia is an annual female beauty pageant in Colombia, founded in 2018 by Top 3 Latam chaired by Neyder Duarte. Previously, the country representatives were selected by the International Portfolio Agency headed by Elías Tobón and Mara Borrego, either by handpicking or through their national pageant, Miss Earth Colombia. Currently, the franchise belongs to the Bogotá-based modeling agency, Casa De Reinas SAS which owns and runs the Miss Grand Colombia beauty contest since 2022.

Colombia holds a record of 6 placements at Miss Grand International, The highest one was the second runner-up, won by María Alejandra López in 2023. The reigning Miss Grand Colombia is Denisse Cuadrado who was crowned on 5 August 2024 at the Hotel Hilton in Cartagena, She will represent Colombia at Miss Grand International 2024 in Thailand/Cambodia.

== History ==
Colombia has been taking part in the Miss Grand International since 2013. However, most of its representatives were assigned to participate without organizing the national preliminary contest specifically. In 2018, the first edition of Miss Grand Colombia was conducted in Villeta of Cundinamarca Department at the BH Tempo Hotel on 11 February after Miss Earth Colombia, who served as the national licensee during 2013 – 2017, had lost the franchise to Top 3 Latam – the Cundinamarca-based pageant organizer, headed by Neyder Duarte. The contest featured 5 national finalists representing 5 national regions, including Altiplano, Andean, Llanos, Orinoquía, and Sinú, of which Génesis Andrea Quintero Pérez from Orinoquía was announced the winner and expected to compete in Myanmar for the international title, but unfortunately forced to resign by the organizer due to health problems after having breast augmentation as well as the financial conflict between them. The organizer then relinquished the franchise to the Concurso Nacional de Belleza de Colombia (CNB Colombia; Miss Colombia), who appointed Sheyla Quizena Nieto to compete at the said platform instead. Nevertheless, Quintero was later assigned to participate in the following international edition in Venezuela by the 2019 national licensee – Luis Humberto Garcés, as the replacement of the former representative, Sthefany Rodríguez, the Colombian-Venezuelan model who resigned the title two months after the appointment; and was placed among the top 20 finalists. Since then, the license had been being transferred to the different organizers every year, including Juan José Mendoza in 2020, back to Miss Colombia in 2021, and under the control of César Prado in 2022.

The representatives of Colombia got placements at Miss Grand International six times in 2013, 2014, 2019, 2021, 2022 and 2023.

== Editions ==
=== Location and date ===
The following list is the edition detail of the Miss Grand Colombia contest, since its inception in 2018.

Edition	Date	Final venue	Entrants	Ref.
1st	11 February 2018	BH Tempo Hotel, Villeta, Cundinamarca	5	
2nd	25 June 2022	Hotel Grand Park, Bogotá D.C	21	
3rd	18 June 2023	Mayor Auditorium CUN, Bogotá D.C	23	
4th	4 August 2024	CCCI convention center, Cartagena, Bolívar	20	

=== Competition result ===
Edition	Winner	Runners-up		Ref.
Edition	Winner	First	Second	Ref.
1st	Génesis Quintero (Orinoquía)	Not awarded		
2nd	Priscilla Londoño (COL. in the US)	Maria Antonia Ruiz (Antioquia)	Luisa González (Valle del Cauca)	
3rd	María Alejandra López (Eje Cafetero)	Yuri Rey (Meta)	Valentina Cárdenas (Zona Andina)	
4th	Dennise Cuadrado (Antioquia)	Luisa Valentina (Cauca)	Lina Zambrano (Atlántico)	

== International competition ==
The following is a list of Colombian representatives at the Miss Grand International contest.

Color keys

- : Declared as the winner
- : Ended as a runner-up (Top 5)
- : Ended as a finalist (Top 10)
- : Ended as a semifinalist (Top 20/21)
- : Ended as special awards winner

Year	Department	Miss Grand Colombia	Title	Placement	Special Awards	National Director
2026	Bolívar	María Paula Berrio	Appointed	Unplaced		
2025	Bogotá	Laura Ramos	Appointed	5th runner-up	Miss Popular Vote	Frank Fernandez
2024	Norte de Santander	Angelica Valero	3rd runner-up Miss Grand Colombia 2024	5th runner-up		Frank Fernandez
2024	Antioquia	Dennise Cuadrado	Miss Grand Colombia 2024	Resigned		Frank Fernandez
2023	Risaralda	María Alejandra López	Miss Grand Colombia 2023	2nd runner-up		César Prado
2022	Texas, United States	Priscilla Londoño	Miss Grand Colombia 2022	5th runner-up		César Prado
2021	Atlántico	Mariana Jaramillo	3rd runner-up Señorita Colombia 2019	Top 20		Raimundo Ángulo
2020	Norte de Santander	Natalia Manrique	Top 10 Señorita Colombia 2019	Unplaced		Juan José Mendoza
2019	Arauca	Génesis Quintero	Miss Grand Colombia 2018	Top 20		Luis Humberto Garcés
2019	Atlántico	Sthefani Rodríguez	Appointed	Did not compete		Luis Humberto Garcés
2018	Atlántico	Sheyla Quizena	4th runner-up Señorita Atlántico 2018	Unplaced		Raimundo Ángulo
2018	Arauca	Génesis Quintero	Miss Grand Colombia 2018	Did not compete		Neyder Duarte
2017	Cauca	Francy Castaño	Appointed	Unplaced		Elías Tobón
2016	Cauca	Juliana Florez	Miss Fire – Miss Earth Colombia 2016	Unplaced		Elías Tobón
2015	Chocó	Gisella Correa	1st runner-up Miss Earth Colombia 2015	Unplaced		Elías Tobón
2014	Valle del Cauca	Mónica Castaño	Appointed	4th runner-up		Elías Tobón
2013	Valle del Cauca	Carolina Betancourth	Appointed	Top 20		Elías Tobón

== Winner gallery ==
Miss Grand Colombia 2026
Maria Paula Berrio

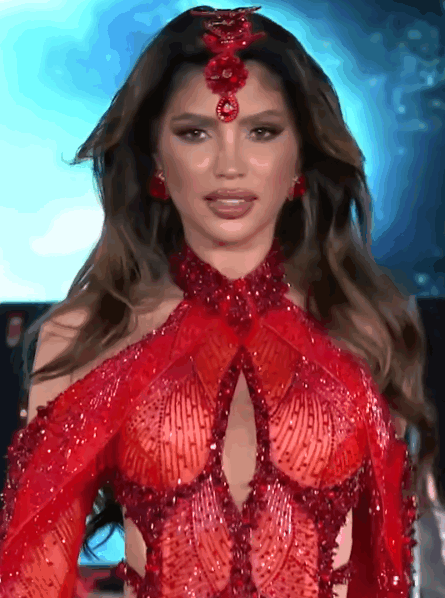
Miss Grand Colombia 2025
Laura Ramos

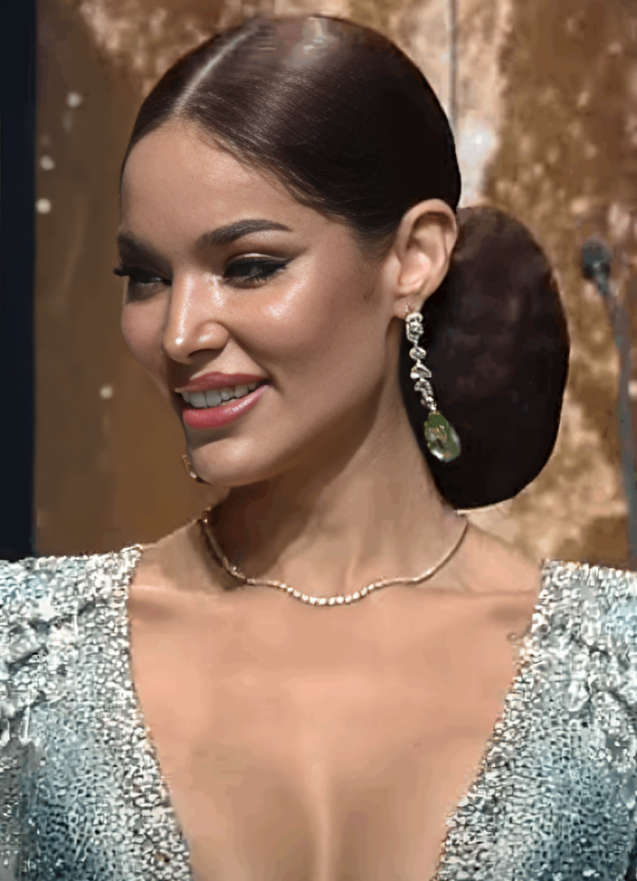
Miss Grand Colombia 2024
Angelica Valero

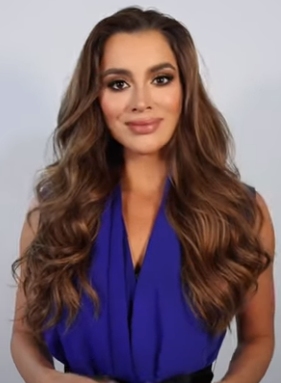
Miss Grand Colombia 2023
María Alejandra López

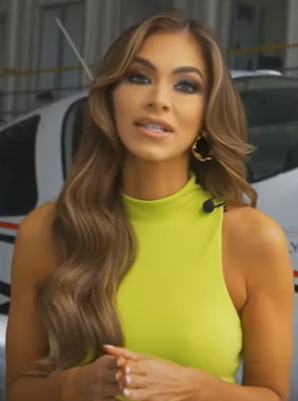
Miss Grand Colombia 2022
Priscilla Londoño

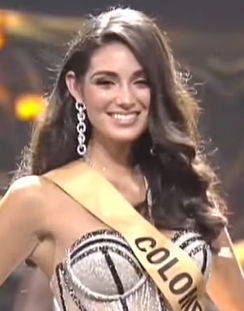
Miss Grand Colombia 2021
Mariana Jaramillo

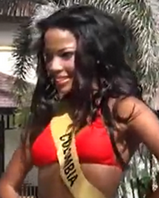
Miss Grand Colombia 2015
Gisella Correa

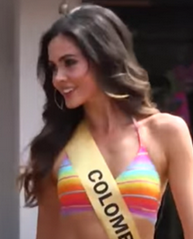
Miss Grand Colombia 2014
Mónica Castaño

== See also ==
- Miss Grand International
- Miss Colombia
- Miss Universe Colombia
- Miss Mundo Colombia
- Miss Earth Colombia
