= Miss Grand Colombia 2024 =

4th Miss Grand Colombia competition

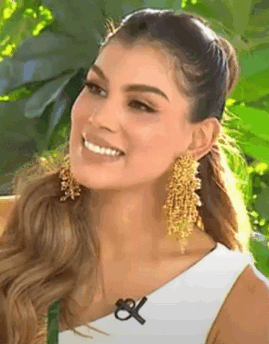
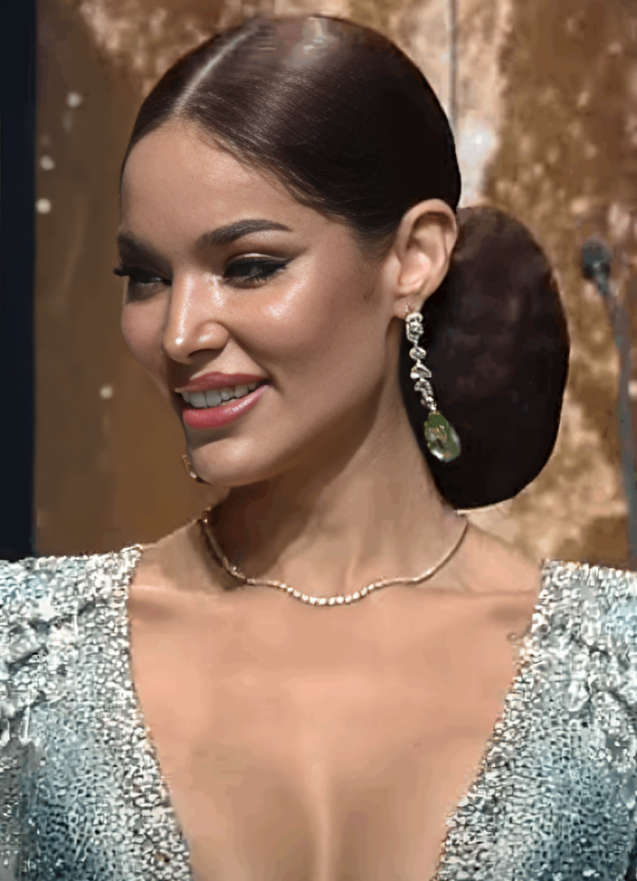
- Dennise Cuadrado; Miss Grand Colombia 2024 (Resigned) Angelica Valero; Miss Grand Colombia 2024 (Assumed)
- Date: 4 August 2024
- Entertainment: Kapo
- Venue: Centro de Convenciones Cartagena de Indias, Cartagena, Colombia
- Entrants: 20
- Placements: 12
- Debuts: Arauca; Atlántico; Caldas; Cartagena; Chocó; Cúcuta; La Guajira; Magdalena; Norte de Santander; Región Caribe; Tolima
- Winner: Dennise Cuadrado (Antioquia)

Miss Grand Colombia 2024 was the fourth Miss Grand Colombia pageant, held at the Centro de Convenciones Cartagena de Indias in Cartagena, Colombia, on 4 August 2024.

The contest was won by Dennise Cuadrado of Antioquia. Cuadrado was crowned by her predecessor María Alejandra López of Eje Cafetero and was set to represent Colombia at the international pageant, Miss Grand International 2024. However, Cuadrado resigned from the title before entering the international contest. Angelica Valero of Norte de Santander later took over the title.

== Background ==
Under the management of the new licensee, the right to send delegates to compete in this year's edition was distributed to local organizers in each department. In case of a lack of licensees, the department representatives were elected by the central organizer through the audion or appointment.

Of the regional licensee group, only two departments namely, Cundinamarca and Valle del Cauca, organized the regional pageants to select their representatives; the remaining were appointed.

The department-level preliminary contests for this year's edition are detailed below.

Pageant	Edition	Date & venue	Entrants	Ref.
Miss Grand Valle del Cauca	1st	April 28, 2024, at the Centro de Eventos Valle del Pacifico, Cali	15	
Miss Grand Cundinamarca	1st	June 22, 2024, at the Auditorio Somos Creadores, Soacha	11	

== Results ==
Miss Grand Colombia 2024 competition result by department/city/etc.
Color key:
Winner	1st RU	2nd RU
3rd RU	4th RU	5th RU
6th RU	Top 12	Unplaced
No representative		RU = Runner-up

Position	Delegate
Miss Grand Colombia 2024	Antioquia - Dennise Cuadrado (Resigned)
1st runner-up	Cauca – Luisa Valentina
2nd runner-up	Atlántico – Lina Zambrano
3rd runner-up	Norte de Santander – Angelica Valero
4th runner-up	Valle del Cauca – Daniela Roldan
5th runner-up	Región Caribe – Ashly Fadul
6th runner-up	Cúcuta – Liliam Pinzon

== Contestants ==
Twenty contestants competed for the title.

Department/etc.	Contestant	Age (Note: Ages at the time of the pageant)	Hometown
Antioquia	Dennise Cuadrado		
Arauca	Antonella Caroprese		
Atlántico	Lina Zambrano	21	Barranquilla
Barranquilla (ATL)	Vanessa García Romero		
Bolívar	Monica Lozano Martinez		
Bucaramanga (SAN)	Karol Barrios		
Caldas	Natalia Gutiérrez		
Cartagena (BOL)	Maria Gabriela Carriazo		
Cauca	Luisa Valentina	23	Popayán
Chocó	Jeniffer Palacios Guerra		
Cúcuta (NSA)	Liliam Pinzon		
Cundinamarca	Laura Valencia		
La Guajira	Claudia Cotes		
Magdalena	Valentina Urbina		
Meta	Laura Beltrán		La Vega
Norte de Santander	Angelica Valero		
Región Caribe	Ashly Fadul	22	Soledad
Santander	Valentina Carreño	24	
Tolima	Dayana Suarez		
Valle del Cauca	Daniela Roldan	19	
