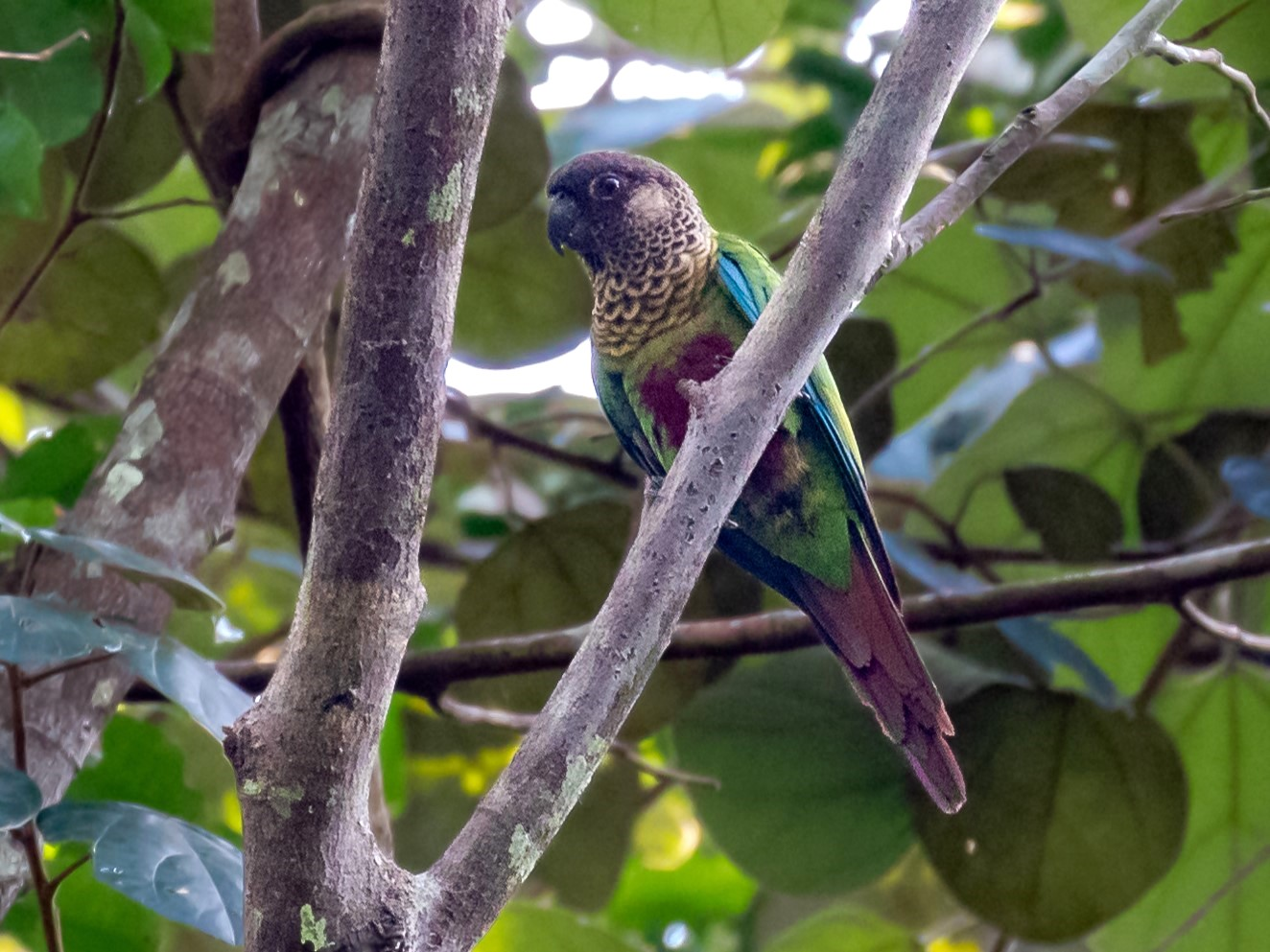

Conservation status
- Least Concern (IUCN 3.1)

Scientific classification
- Kingdom: Animalia
- Phylum: Chordata
- Class: Aves
- Order: Psittaciformes
- Family: Psittacidae
- Genus: Pyrrhura
- Species: P. lucianii

Binomial name
- Pyrrhura lucianii (Deville, 1851)

Synonyms
- Pyrrhura picta lucianii

= Bonaparte's parakeet =

Species of bird

Bonaparte's parakeet (Pyrrhura lucianii), also known as Deville's parakeet, or in aviculture as Deville's conure, is a species of parrot in the family Psittacidae. It is restricted to the Brazilian state of Amazonas south of the Solimões river.

== Description ==
Total length c. 22 centimetres (8.7 in). As other members of the Pyrrhura picta complex, it is a long-tailed mainly green parakeet with a dark red belly, rump and tail-tip (tail all dark red from below), pale grey scaling to the chest, a whitish or dull buff patch on the auriculars and bluish remiges. The cheeks and crown are dark dusky-maroon (often appears almost blackish). Unlike other members of the P. picta complex, it lacks any bright red or blue to the head (but see Taxonomy). The legs are dark greyish.

== Habitat and behavior ==
It occurs in tropical humid lowland forest and adjacent habitats. It is social and typically seen in pairs or groups. It feeds on fruits, seeds and flowers. The nest is placed in a tree cavity. It is likely to be fairly common within its range, but generally very poorly known, as the remote region where it occurs rarely is visited by ornithologists.

== Taxonomy ==
It has typically been considered a subspecies of Pyrrhura picta. As with most other taxa in the P. picta complex, Joseph (2002) recommended that lucianii should be recognized as a monotypic species, P. lucianii. Ribas et al. (2006) did not include lucianii in their study, but did find that P. picta (sensu stricto) was closer to some members of the P. leucotis complex than to the various taxa found mainly south of the Amazon River and traditionally considered as subspecies of it. Consequently, Ribas et al. recommended that the west Amazonian taxa (roseifrons and peruviana) and the east Amazonian taxa (amazonum and snethlageae) should be considered two separate species. Based on biogeography, it therefore becomes unlikely that P. lucianii is a subspecies of P. picta, but the possibility that it is better regarded as conspecific with either P. amazonum or P. roseifrons cannot be discounted on basis of current knowledge. P. lucianii was described before both P. amazonum and P. roseifrons, meaning that they, if one of these scenarios was found to be correct, would become subspecies of P. lucianii (i.e. P. lucianii amazonum or P. lucianii roseifrons). SACC voted to recognize P. lucianii as a species.

Another problem relates to the population of the P. picta complex from far north-eastern Peru. These individuals with red to the forecrown have often (e.g. Juniper and Parr, 1998) been regarded as typical of P. lucianii. Joseph (2002) found that this was incorrect, with true P. lucianii being restricted to Brazil and lacking any bright red to the head. The taxonomic position of the population in far north-eastern Peru, labelled as "group 6" by Joseph (2002), therefore remains unclear, it having been speculated that it could be a distinct species, a subspecies of either P. roseifrons or P. lucianii, a hybrid between the P. roseifrons and P. lucianii (which, if found to be true, could indicate that P. lucianii and P. roseifrons are better considered conspecific), or a hybrid between the currently recognized subspecies of P. roseifrons. Arndt (2008) recently argued for treating it as a distinct species, which he described as P. parvifrons, but this has yet to receive widespread recognition (e.g. by SACC).
