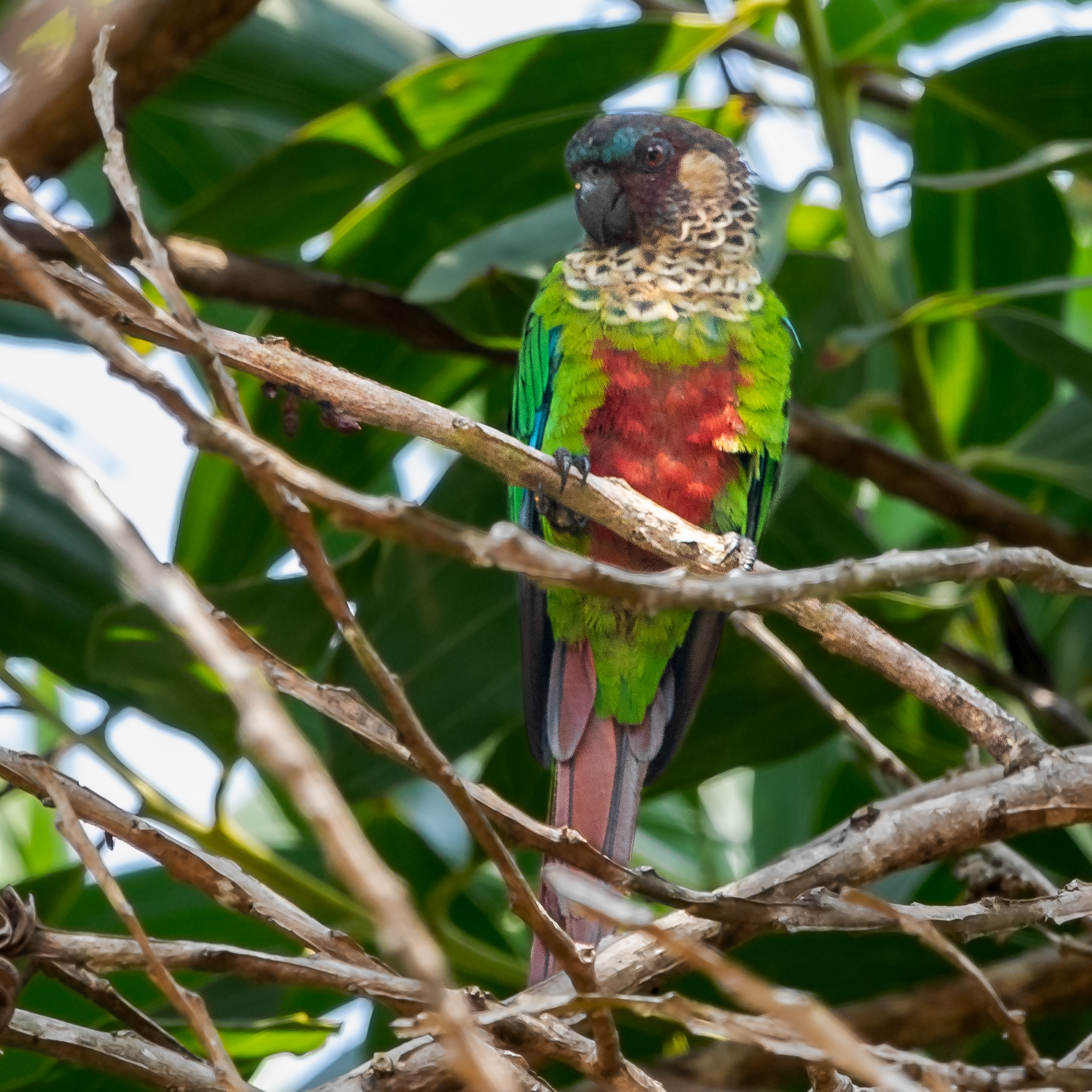

Conservation status
- Near Threatened (IUCN 3.1)

Scientific classification
- Kingdom: Animalia
- Phylum: Chordata
- Class: Aves
- Order: Psittaciformes
- Family: Psittacidae
- Genus: Pyrrhura
- Species: P. amazonum

Binomial name
- Pyrrhura amazonum Hellmayr, 1906

Synonyms
- Pyrrhura picta amazonum; Pyrrhura picta microtera

= Santarem parakeet =

Species of bird in Brazil

The Santarém parakeet (Pyrrhura amazonum), also known as Hellmayr's parakeet or in aviculture as Hellmayr's conure or the Santarém conure, is a species of parrot in the family Psittacidae. It is found in the eastern and central sections of the Amazon basin south of the Amazon River, only just extending onto the northern bank of this river.

== Taxonomy ==
There are three subspecies recognized by the International Ornithological Congress:

- P. a. amazonum Hellmayr, 1906 - north of the Amazon River between Monte Alegre and Obidos, south of the Amazon between the Tapajós and Tocantins rivers
- P. a. pallescens Miranda-Ribeiro, 1926 (previously P. a. snethlageae) - Madeira River basin in southwest Brazil and northern Bolivia
- P. a. lucida Arndt, 2008 - in the vicinity of the Teles Pires and Cristalino Rivers, in Mato Grosso

It has typically been considered a subspecies of the painted parakeet. While reviewing this group, Joseph (2002) discovered that an undescribed population existed in central Brazil (later also found in north-eastern Bolivia). It was described as Pyrrhura snethlageae (Joseph and Bates, 2002). No diagnostic difference was found between the taxa amazonum and microtera; it was therefore recommend that the latter should be considered a junior synonym of the former. As with most other taxa of the Pyrrhura picta complex, it was recommended that amazonum should be recognized as a monotypic species, P. amazonum, instead of a subspecies of P. picta.

Ribas et al. (2006) confirmed by mtDNA that P. amazonum should be considered a species separate from P. picta (otherwise, P. picta would be paraphyletic), but also showed that snethlageae was very close to, and arguably better considered a subspecies of, P. amazonum (as already had been expected due to a number of intermediate specimens suggesting that hybrids occur). Consequently, SACC voted to recognize P. amazonum as a species with snethlageae as a subspecies. Arndt (2008) described yet another taxon from this complex, lucida, as a subspecies of P. snethlageae, but under the taxonomy used by the IOC, it becomes a subspecies of P. amazonum. The taxonomic status in relations to Deville's parakeet remains unclear.

In 2016, a review of names found snethlageae to apply to a previously-described subspecies, pallescens, and to thus be synonymous with that subspecies. This synonymization was followed by the IOC.

== Description ==
Total length c. 22 cm (8 3/4 in). As other members of the Pyrrhura picta complex, it is a long-tailed mainly green parakeet with a dark red belly, rump and tail-tip (tail all dark red from below), a whitish or dull buff patch on the auriculars and bluish remiges. The cheeks and ocular region are dark maroon. The nominate subspecies (P. a. amazonum) has a narrow blue forehead-band and pale grey scaling to the chest. The remaining subspecies, P. a. snethlageae and P. a. lucida, have little or no blue to the forecrown and their chests are, uniquely for the P. picta complex, overall pale with relatively narrow, dark pointed markings. P. a. lucida is slightly smaller and paler than P. a. snethlageae. Some P. a. snethlageae have a yellowish eye-ring (the basis for this variation remains unknown), but it is more commonly dark grey as in the remaining subspecies. All subspecies have dark greyish legs.

== Habitat and behavior ==
It is restricted to Brazil and Bolivia. It occurs in tropical humid lowland forest and adjacent habitats. It is social and typically seen in pairs or groups. It feeds on fruits, seeds and flowers. The nest is placed in a tree cavity. It is fairly common in most of its range and occurs in several protected areas, e.g. P. a. amazonum occurs in the Amazônia National Park, Pará, Brazil, while P. a. lucida occurs in the Cristalino State Park, Mato Grosso, Brazil.
