= Miss Grand Colombia 2018 =

1st Miss Grand Colombia competition, beauty pageant edition

- Date: 11 February 2018
- Venue: BH Tempo Hotel, Villeta, Cundinamarca
- Broadcaster: YouTube
- Entrants: 5
- Placements: 5
- Debuts: Altiplano; Andean; Llanos; Orinoquía; Sinú
- Winner: Génesis Quintero (Orinoquía)

Miss Grand Colombia 2018 was the first edition of the Miss Grand Colombia beauty pageant, held on February 11, 2018, at the BH Tempo Hotel in Villeta, Cundinamarca. At the end of the event, Génesis Quintero of Orinoquía was named the winner, outclassing the other four contestants, and was expected to represent Colombia at the Miss Grand International 2018 pageant in Myanmar.

The organizer, however, forced Quintero to resign due to health issues following breast augmentation; she was not physically fit to participate, as claimed by the director, as well as a financial conflict between them. The organizer then also relinquished the competition license to the Miss Colombia organization (CNB Colombia), which later nominated Sheyla Quizena, a 21-year-old international business student, as the new country representative for the aforementioned international contest, but Sheyla did not get any placements in such an event.

Following her victory, Génesis was criticized for her physical appearance by certain Colombian netizens, with some even wishing for her death, according to her, caused her to release an open letter to retaliate. After her resignation in late 2018, she was instead assigned to participate in the Miss Grand International 2019 contest in Venezuela, as the replacement for the former representative, Sthefany Rodríguez, who resigned the title two months after the appointment, by that year's licensee, Luis Humberto Garcés, and she was placed among the top 20 finalists.

== Results ==
=== Placements ===
Placement	Contestant
Miss Grand Colombia 2018	Orinoquía – Génesis Quintero
Miss Top Model Colombia 2018	Llanos – Paola Cazarán
Miss Top Model Colombia 2019	Sinú – Nashaira Balentien
Miss Super Model Colombia 2018	Altiplano – María del Mar Meza
Miss Hawaiian Tropic Colombia 2018	Andean – Sara Victoria

== Candidates ==
Five contestants competed for the title of Miss Grand Colombia 2018.

Region	Candidate	Age	Height
Altiplano	María del Mar Meza	25	1.73 m (5 ft 8 in)
Andean	Sara Victoria	21	1.70 m (5 ft 7 in)
Llanos	Paola Cazarán	24	1.72 m (5 ft 7 1/2 in)
Orinoquía	Génesis Quintero	26	1.76 m (5 ft 9 1/2 in)
Sinú	Nashaira Balentien	19	1.78 m (5 ft 10 in)
