= Paulina Vega =

Colombian beauty pageant titleholder

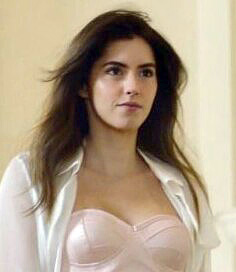
- Vega in 2018
- Born: Paulina Vega Dieppa; January 15, 1993 (age 33); Barranquilla, Atlántico, Colombia
- Education: Deutsche Schule Bogotá
- Alma mater: Pontifical Xavierian University (BBA)
- Occupations: TV host; model; businesswoman; television personality
- Height: 1.78 m (5 ft 10 in)
- Beauty pageant titleholder
- Title: Miss Colombia 2013; Miss Universe 2014
- Major competitions: Miss Colombia 2013; (Winner); Miss Universe 2014; (Winner)

Paulina Vega Dieppa (Spanish pronunciation: [pawˈlina ˈβeɣa]; born January 15, 1993) is a Colombian model, business administrator and beauty queen who won Miss Universe 2014, she previously won Miss Colombia 2013. Vega was the second Miss Universe from Colombia.

== Early life ==
Paulina Vega Dieppa was born in Barranquilla, Atlántico, Colombia to Laura Dieppa and cardiologist Rodolfo Vega Llama. Vega is of French and Spanish descent. She is the granddaughter of Colombian tenor Gastón Vega and Miss Atlántico 1953 Elvira Castillo. Vega completed her elementary and high school education between Colegio Karl C. Parrish and the German School of Barranquilla during her years living in the Caribbean city, after moving to the andean and capital city of Bogotá D.C where she finished her last years at Deutsche Schule Bogotá. She also studied Business Administration at the Pontifical Xavierian University.

== Pageantry ==
=== Miss Colombia 2013 ===
Vega entered and won Miss Colombia 2013 on November 11, 2013, held in Cartagena, representing Atlántico. She gained the right to represent her country at Miss Universe 2014. She was crowned by the outgoing titleholder Lucia Aldana. Vega became the 11th Miss Atlántico accent to win the title since the pageant began in 1934, the first Miss Atlantico to win Miss Universe, and the second Colombian to win Miss Universe after Luz Marina Zuluaga in 1958.

=== Miss Universe 2014 ===
Vega entered and won Miss Universe 2014 on January 25, 2015, in Doral, Florida, against 87 contestants. She was crowned by her predecessor, Gabriela Isler from Venezuela. She was the second Colombian in 56 years to win Miss Universe, after Miss Universe 1958 Luz Marina Zuluaga. Vega wore the pageant's new crown, designed by Diamonds International Corporation, a Czech-based jeweler officially responsible for Miss Universe jewelry. Her prize package included money, a year contract promoting Miss Universe, world travel, a rent-free luxury apartment in New York City, a gift bag with designer shoes, dresses, and beauty products, a US$100,000 stipend for a two-year course at the New York Film Academy, and free access to famous fashion houses and beauty parlors. Vega intended to spend her year traveling the world to lecture on humanitarian issues and to promote education regards HIV/AIDS.

Awards and achievements
Preceded by (Venezuela) Gabriela Isler	Miss Universe; 2014	Succeeded by (Philippines) Pia Wurtzbach
Preceded by Lucia Aldana	Miss Colombia; 2013	Succeeded by Ariadna Gutiérrez
Preceded by Yuliana Mejía	Miss Atlántico; 2013	Succeeded by Mayra León
