= Cristina Rodriguez (painter) =

Colombian painter

Cristina Rodriguez is a Colombian painter, who works on cultural influences and indigenous environmental themes.

== Early life and education ==
Rodriguez was born in Colombia and attended Colegio Andino in Bogotá and later studied Fine Arts at the University of Los Andes, Bogotá. She was influenced by artists, Lorenzo Jaramillo and Humberto Giangrandi.

== Exhibitions ==
- My Gift to a Continent (1991, Cadogan Gallery, London, UK)
- The Carnival of the Animals (1997, The Pump House Gallery, London, UK)
- La Fête Sous la Pyramide (1999, Carrousel du Louvre, Paris, France)
- Jump Into Reality (2001, The Air Gallery, London, UK)
- De los Alpes a los Andes (2014, Deimos Gallery, Bogotá, Colombia)

== Awards ==
- Icetex Scholarship, Government of Colombia (1989)
- British Council Scholarship (1990)
- Delfina Studios Scholarship (1992)
- Travel Scholarships to Zimbabwe and New York (1993, 1995)
