= Miss Grand Colombia 2022 =

2nd Miss Grand Colombia competition, beauty pageant edition

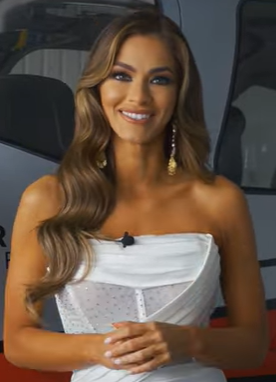
- Priscilla Londoño, the winner of the contest
- Date: June 24, 2022
- Presenters: Ariel Osorio
- Entertainment: Adriana Lucía
- Venue: Hotel Grand Park, Bogotá, Colombia
- Broadcaster: YouTube
- Entrants: 21
- Placements: 10
- Withdrawals: Altiplano; Andean; Llanos; Orinoquía; Sinú
- Winner: Priscilla Londoño (United States)

External videos
- Miss Grand Colombia 2022 Grand Final Competition, on 24 June 2022, YouTube video

Miss Grand Colombia 2022 was the second Miss Grand Colombia pageant, held at the Hotel Grand Park in Bogotá, Colombia, on June 24, 2022.

At the end of the event, Priscilla Londoño was crowned Miss Grand Colombia 2022. She then represented Colombia at Miss Grand International 2022, held on October 25 in Indonesia, and finished as 5th Runner-Up.

== Background ==
On the occasion of celebrating the pageant's first decade anniversary, Priscilla was also assumed by the international organizer to be one of the fifth runners-up, and she then spent a few months of her reign working with the organization in Indonesia and Thailand.

In addition to Miss Grand International 2022, some national finalists of Miss Grand Colombia 2022 were later assigned by the organizer to participate in other international contests, including the second runner-up, Luisa Gonzalez, for the Miss Orb International 2022 in Costa Rica, and Jenny López Bolaños for the Reina del Mundo 2022 pageant in Venezuela.

The event was hosted by Ariel Osorio, and featured a live performance by Colombian singer Adriana Lucía. Besides participants with Colombian citizenship, contestants of Colombian descent from other countries were authorized to participate.

== Results ==
=== Placements ===
Placement	Contestant
Miss Grand Colombia 2022	13 – Priscilla Londoño
1st Runner-Up	11 – Maria Antonia Ruiz
2nd Runner-Up	09 – Luisa González
Top 6	07 – Loren Moreno; 12 – Matilde Lina López; 17 – Vanessa Ortiz
Top 12	01 – Alejandra Angarita; 03 – Danna Valentina Pedreros; 04 – Jenny López Bolaños; 06 – Lizeth Montañez; 16 – Valeria Castillo; 21 – Brenda Giraldo

== Contestants ==
21 contestants competed for the national title of Miss Grand Colombia 2022.

Candidate	Age	Height
María Antonia Ruíz	19	1.76 m (5 ft 9 1/2 in)
Alejandra Angarita	23	1.73 m (5 ft 8 in)
Brenda Giraldo	27	1.73 m (5 ft 8 in)
Carolina Osorno	19	1.72 m (5 ft 7 1/2 in)
Evelin López	19	1.70 m (5 ft 7 in)
Jenny López Bolaños	22	1.76 m (5 ft 9 1/2 in)
Laura Morales	24	1.70 m (5 ft 7 in)
Lizeth Montañez	20	1.74 m (5 ft 8 1/2 in)
Loren Moreno	20	1.70 m (5 ft 7 in)
Luisa Acevedo	19	1.76 m (5 ft 9 1/2 in)
Luisa González	24	1.78 m (5 ft 10 in)
Manuela Loaiza Guzmán	18	1.71 m (5 ft 7 1/2 in)
Mathilde Lina López	28	1.74 m (5 ft 8 1/2 in)
Patricia Díaz Escalante	21	1.73 m (5 ft 8 in)
Priscilla Londoño	28	1.76 m (5 ft 9 1/2 in)
Valentina Gómez	18	1.70 m (5 ft 7 in)
Valentina Pedreros	21	1.70 m (5 ft 7 in)
Valentina Vega	21	1.75 m (5 ft 9 in)
Valeria Castillo	18	1.75 m (5 ft 9 in)
Vanessa Ortiz	26	1.70 m (5 ft 7 in)
Yaved Henao Acosta	24	1.70 m (5 ft 7 in)
