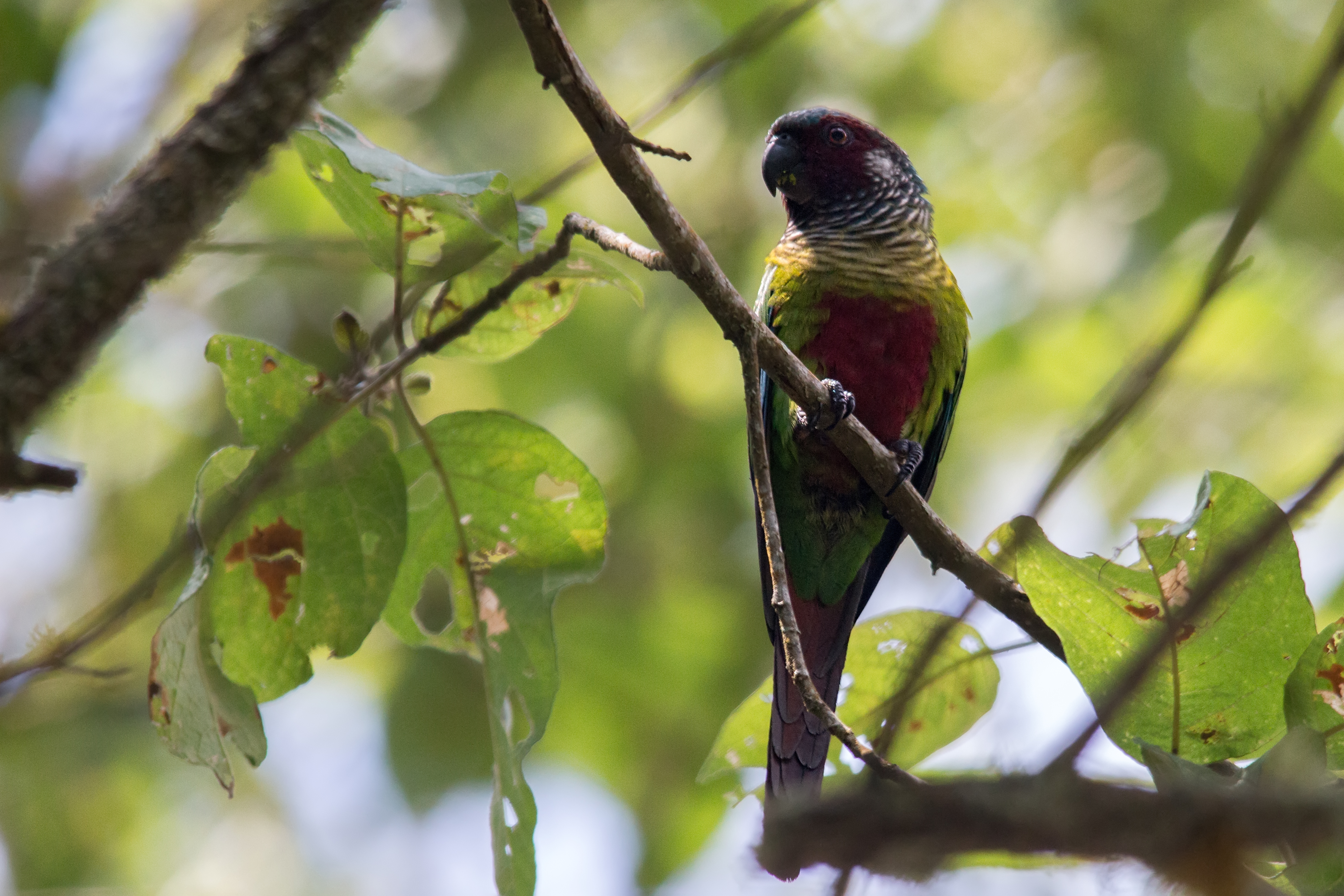

Conservation status
- Least Concern (IUCN 3.1)
- CITES Appendix II

Scientific classification
- Kingdom: Animalia
- Phylum: Chordata
- Class: Aves
- Order: Psittaciformes
- Family: Psittacidae
- Genus: Pyrrhura
- Species: P. emma

Binomial name
- Pyrrhura emma Salvadori, 1891

Synonyms
- Pyrrhura picta emma

= Venezuelan parakeet =

Species of bird

The Venezuelan parakeet (Pyrrhura emma) or Emma's conure is a species of bird in subfamily Arinae of the family Psittacidae, the African and New World parrots. It is endemic to Venezuela.

== Taxonomy and systematics ==
The Venezuelan parakeet's taxonomy is unsettled. At one time it was considered a subspecies of what is now the white-eared parakeet (P. leucotis). The International Ornithological Committee (IOC) and BirdLife International's Handbook of the Birds of the World (HBW) treat it as a full species. The IOC considers it to be monotypic but HBW assigns it two subspecies, P. e. emma and P. e. auricularis. The South American Classification Committee of the American Ornithological Society and the Clements taxonomy consider it to be a subspecies of the painted parakeet (P. picta).

This article follows the IOC treatment.

== Description ==
The Venezuelan parakeet is 22 to 23 cm (8.7 to 9.1 in) long. The sexes are the same. Adults have a blue crown, a plum-red face, a gray-brown nape, and whitish ear coverts. Their upperparts are mostly green with a red-brown rump. Their chin, throat, and the sides of their neck are gray-olive with pale scaling. The center of their belly is red-brown and the rest of their underparts are green. Their wing is mostly green with a red-brown shoulder and blue primaries. Their tail is red-brown. Their bill is dusky and their eyes orange to yellow with bare dark gray skin surrounding them. Immatures are similar to adults.

== Distribution and habitat ==
The Venezuelan parakeet is found in two separate areas of the Venezuelan Coastal Range. One population is found between Yaracuy and Miranda and the other from Anzoátegui to Sucre and northern Monagas. It inhabits the interior and edges of humid and wet forest and also clearings with scattered trees. In elevation it primarily ranges between 250 and 1,700 m (800 and 5,600 ft) but is found down to sea level in Sucre.

== Behavior ==
=== Movement ===
The Venezuelan parakeet is not known to have any pattern of movement.

=== Feeding ===
The Venezuelan parakeet's foraging behavior and diet are not well known. It usually travels in flocks of up to about 30 individuals, and has been recorded feeding on fruits, flowers, and nectar.

=== Breeding ===
The Venezuelan parakeet's breeding season is thought to be May to July but nothing else is known about its breeding biology.

=== Vocalization ===
The Venezuelan parakeet's call is "a loud, harsh "kik-kik-kik-kik" ". It also makes a ""wa-Ke-Ke-Ke-ka" in anger or distress when perched".

== Status ==
The IUCN has assessed the Venezuelan parakeet as being of Least Concern. It has a large range but its population size is not known and is thought to be decreasing. "Trapping for trade and land-use changes may be driving a decline in the population, although neither of these threats are regarded as serious for this species at present." It is considered fairly common and occurs in several national parks and other preserves.
