= Miss Colombia 2013 =

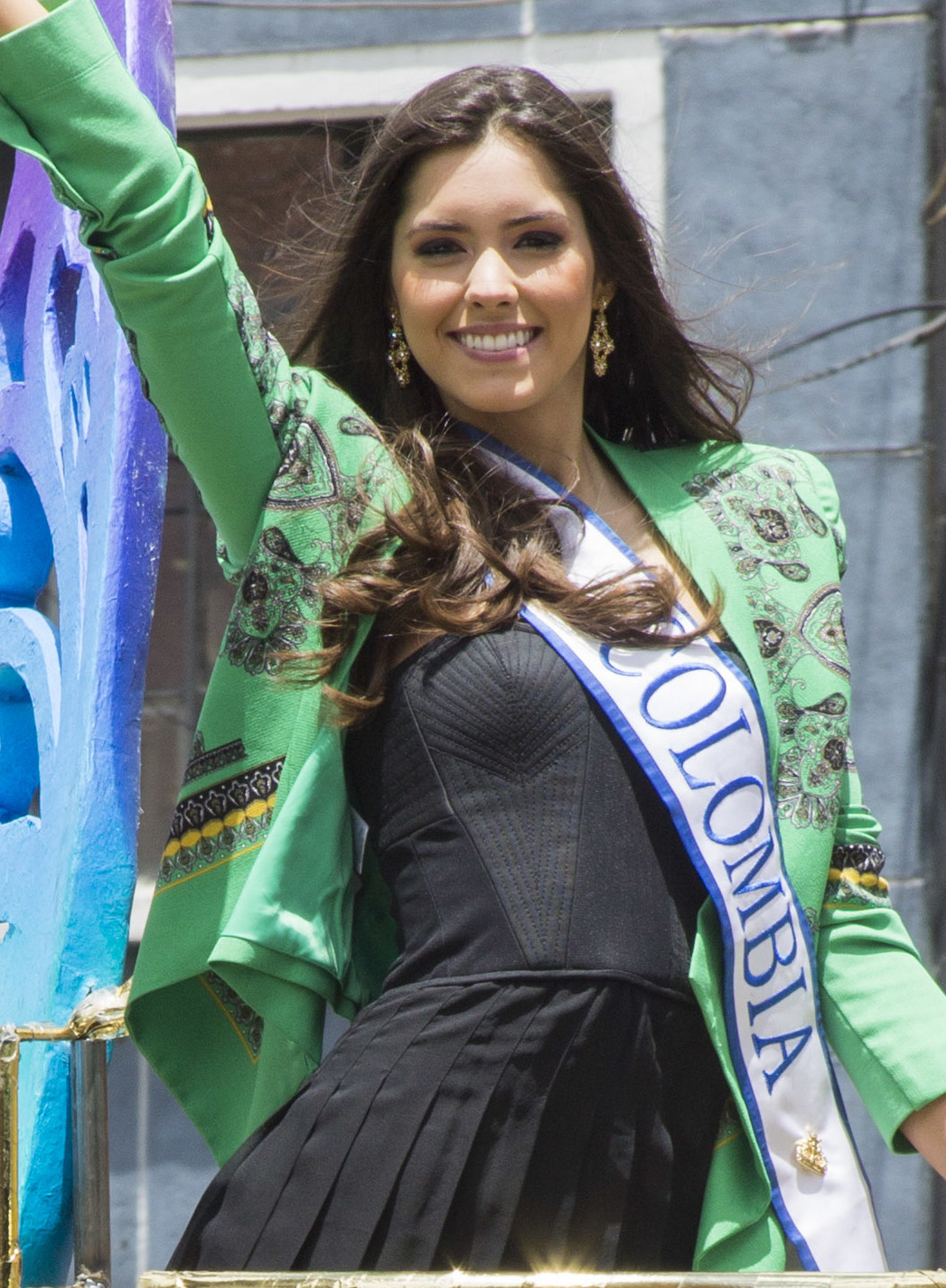
- Paulina Vega, Miss Colombia 2013 (photographed in 2014)
- Date: November 11, 2013
- Presenters: Andrea Serna; Catalina Robayo; Carlos Calero
- Entertainment: Alejandro Sanz
- Venue: Auditorio Getsemani-Centro de Convenciones Julio César Turbay Ayala Cartagena de Indias, Colombia
- Broadcaster: RCN TV
- Entrants: 21
- Placements: 10
- Withdrawals: Cordoba; Cundinamarca; Santander; Sucre
- Winner: Paulina Vega; Atlántico
- Congeniality: Carolina Crovo; Antioquia
- Best National Costume: Paulina Vega; Atlántico
- Photogenic: Stefanny Castro; Meta

Miss Colombia 2013 was the 61st edition of the Miss Colombia pageant. It was held on November 11, 2013, in Cartagena, Colombia.

At the end of the event, Lucia Aldana of Valle crowned Paulina Vega of Atlántico as Miss Colombia 2013–2014. She represented Colombia in Miss Universe 2014 and was crowned the winner.

== Results ==
Color keys

- The contestant won in an International pageant.
- The contestant was a Finalist/Runner-up in an International pageant.
- The contestant did not place.

Placement	Contestant	International placement
Miss Colombia 2013	Atlántico – Paulina Vega	Winner – Miss Universe 2014
1st Runner-Up	San Andrés – Zuleika Suárez	1st Runner-Up – Miss International 2014
2nd Runner-Up	Risaralda – María Alejandra López	Winner – Reina Hispanoamericana 2013
3rd Runner-Up	Antioquia – Carolina Crovo Sierra	Unplaced – Miss Intercontinental 2014
4th Runner-Up	Valle – Tania Valencia Cuero	Winner – Top Model of the World 2014
Top 10	Arauca – Paola Ruiz Quiroga; Cartagena – Juliana Dahl Vélez; Cauca – Cindy Viviana Clavijo Chamorro; Magdalena – Oriana Galofre Charris; Quindío – Daniella Jhoana Calderón Novoa	

=== Scores ===
Miss Colombia 2013-2014
1st Runner-up
2nd Runner-up
3rd Runner-up
4th Runner-up
Top 10

Department	Evening Gown	Swimsuit	Average Semifinalist
Atlántico	9.9 (1)	9.9 (1)	9.90 (1)
San Andrés, P. and S.C.	9.6 (3)	9.9 (1)	9.75 (2)
Risaralda	9.6 (3)	9.8 (3)	9.70 (3)
Antioquia	9.6 (3)	9.5 (4)	9.55 (5)
Valle	9.7 (2)	9.5 (4)	9.60 (4)
Arauca	9.1 (10)	9.4 (6)	9.25 (6)
Cartagena, D.T. and C.	9.3 (6)	9.2 (8)	9.25 (6)
Magdalena	9.2 (7)	9.3 (7)	9.25 (6)
Cauca	9.2 (7)	9.2 (8)	9.20 (9)
Quindío	9.2 (7)	9.0 (10)	9.10 (10)
Huila	8.8		
Caquetá	8.6		
Guajira	8.6		
Meta	8.6		
Bogotá D.C.	8.5		
Chocó	8.5		
Norte de Santander	8.5		
Bolívar	8.4		
Cesar	8.4		
Nariño	8.3		
Tolima	8.2		

== Special awards ==
Award	Winner
Best Regional Costume (Mejor Traje Artesanal)	Atlántico - Paulina Vega
Miss Congeniality (Mejor Compañera)	Antioquia - Carolina Crovo Sierra
Miss Photogenic (Señorita Fotogenica)	Meta - Yagil Esthefany Castro Contreras
Best Face (Rostro Jolie)	Risaralda - María Alejandra López Pérez
Best Body (Figura Bodytech)	Valle - Tania Valencia Cuero
Queen of the Police (Reina de la Policía)	Quindío - Daniella Jhoana Calderón Novoa
Miss Elegance (Señorita Elegancia Primatela)	Cauca - Cindy Viviana Clavijo Chamorro
Zapatilla Real	Cauca - Cindy Viviana Clavijo Chamorro

== Delegates ==
21 delegates have been selected to compete.

Department / District	Name	Age	Height	Hometown
Antioquia	Carolina Crovo Sierra	20	179 cm (5 ft 10 1/2 in)	Medellín
Arauca	Paola Ruiz Quiroga	22	173 cm (5 ft 8 in)	Arauca
Atlántico	Paulina Vega Dieppa	20	178 cm (5 ft 10 in)	Barranquilla
Bogotá D.C.	Jennifer Uscategui Galindo	20	172 cm (5 ft 7 1/2 in)	Bogotá
Bolívar	Geraldine Alvarez Hernandez	22	173 cm (5 ft 8 in)	Cartagena
Caquetá	Laura Torres Londoño	22	183 cm (6 ft 0 in)	Florencia
Cartagena, D.T. and C.	Juliana Dahl Vélez	20	171 cm (5 ft 7 1/2 in)	Cartagena
Cauca	Cindy Viviana Clavijo	24	175 cm (5 ft 9 in)	Cali
Cesar	Andrea Salas Danies	22	180 cm (5 ft 11 in)	Valledupar
Chocó	Yesuli Londoño Mosquera	19	173 cm (5 ft 8 in)	Quibdó
La Guajira	Vivian Martinez Arguelles	22	173 cm (5 ft 8 in)	Riohacha
Huila	María Juliana Silva Sinning	21	178 cm (5 ft 10 in)	Bogotá
Magdalena	Oriana Galofre Charris	23	176 cm (5 ft 9 1/2 in)	Santa Marta
Meta	Yagil Stefanny Castro Contreras	18	169 cm (5 ft 6 1/2 in)	Villavicencio
Nariño	Belkis Eliana Rivadeneira Pantoja	24	166 cm (5 ft 5 1/2 in)	Linares
Norte de Santander	Angelica Villasmil	22	174 cm (5 ft 8 1/2 in)	Cúcuta
Quindío	Daniella Calderón Novoa	20	172 cm (5 ft 7 1/2 in)	Armenia
Risaralda	Maria Alejandra López	19	178 cm (5 ft 10 in)	Pereira
San Andrés, P. and S.C.	Zuleika Kiara Suárez Torrenegra	19	180 cm (5 ft 11 in)	San Andrés
Tolima	Sandra Paola Arias Muñoz	24	169 cm (5 ft 6 1/2 in)	Ibagué
Valle	Tania Valencia Cuero	23	176 cm (5 ft 9 1/2 in)	Cali

== Contestants Notes ==
- Maria Alejandra Lopez was crowned Reina Hispanoamericana 2013 which was held in Santa Cruz, Bolivia on December 12, 2013. In 2014, she also won Miss Caraïbes Hibiscus 2014, which was held in Saint Martin on December 6, 2014.
