= Zuleika Suárez =

Colombian model and beauty queen (born 1994)

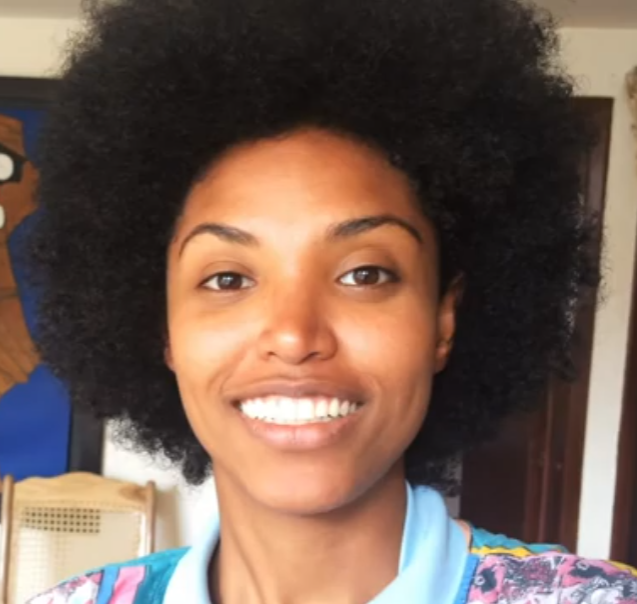
- In a 2020 video
- Born: Zuleika Kiara Suárez Torrenegra; June 25, 1994 (age 32); San Andrés, Colombia
- Height: 1.80 m (5 ft 11 in)
- Beauty pageant titleholder
- Title: Miss San Andrés 2013; Miss International Colombia 2013
- Hair color: Dark Brown
- Eye color: Brown
- Major competitions: Miss Colombia 2013 (1st Runner-Up); Miss International 2014 (1st Runner-Up)

Zuleika Kiara Suárez Torrenegra (born June 25, 1994) is a Colombian model and beauty pageant titleholder who competed in the 61st version of Miss Colombia, gaining the title of Miss Colombia International / first runner-up and representative of Colombia to Miss International 2014 where she again won the title of first-runner up.

== Early life ==
Zuleika Kiara Suarez was born on June 25, 1994, in Free Town, San Andrés. She studied anthropology at the National University of Colombia.

== Miss Colombia 2013 ==
She participated, representing San Andrés, in Miss Colombia 2013, held in Cartagena on November 11, 2013. At the end of the gala, she ended up as Miss Colombia International / first runner up of the contest, and got the opportunity to compete in Miss International 2014 as a participant in Colombia.

== Miss International 2014 ==
Zuleika represented Colombia at the Miss International 2014 pageant, which was held in Tokyo, Japan, November 11, 2014, winning the title of first-runner up in addition to Miss Friendship award as well as Miss Best Dress award.

Awards and achievements
Preceded by (Netherlands) Nathalie den Dekker	Miss International 1st Runner-Up; 2014	Succeeded by (Honduras) Jennifer Valle
