= German Colombians =

Colombian citizens of German ancestry

Deutschkolumbianer · Germanocolombianos: 1,500,000 (including descendants); 9,688 German nationals (including children of migrants) in 2011; 4,500 German residents in 1938
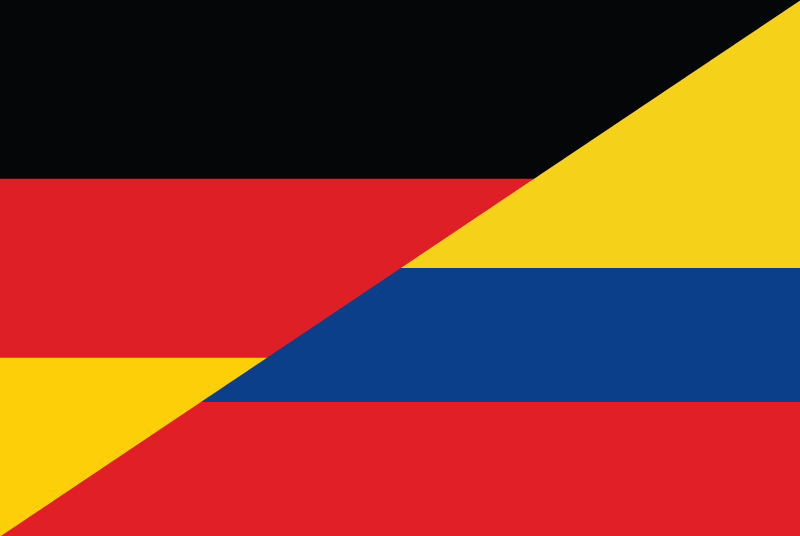
- Hybrid flag of Germany and Colombia.

Regions with significant populations
- Bogotá, Santander, Antioquia, Caribbean region, Norte de Santander, Huila, Boyacá, Cundinamarca, Nariño, Valle del Cauca, Meta

Languages
- Colombian Spanish · German and German dialects

Religion
- Roman Catholicism · Protestantism (Lutheranism · Evangelicalism) · Atheism · Judaism

German Colombians (German: Deutschkolumbianer; Spanish: Germanocolombianos) are Colombian citizens of German ancestry. They may be descendants of Germans who immigrated to Colombia from Germany or elsewhere in Europe. Most German Colombians live in the departments of Andean Region and Caribbean Region. Germans have been immigrating to Colombia since at least the 16th century. During World War II, thousands of Germans fled to Colombia.

== German immigration to Colombia ==
The first German immigrants arrived in the 16th century contracted by the Spanish Crown and the Welser family, a banking and merchant dynasty from Augsburg who maintained extensive financial connections in what is now known as Colombia. On 12 February 1528, the Spanish Crown concluded an agreement with Heinrich Ehinger andHieronymus Sailer, representatives of the Welser company, authorizing the recruitment of hundreds of German miners into the Nuevo Reino de Granada. These expeditions also included explorers such as Ambrosio Alfinger, Nikolaus Federmann, Georg von Speyer and Philipp von Hutten. These missions in search of the legend of El Dorado other valuable resources lead the Germans into territories that now form part of the Colombian departments of Cesar, Norte de Santander and modern day Bucaramanga.

By the mid of the 18th century, German businessmen arrived to Barranquilla in Atlántico, and El Carmen de Bolívar, in Bolívar, with the purpose of exploiting tobacco. Most of them were from Bremen. Germans had absolute control of these businesses for three decades, expanding their trade quarters to biggest cities like Cartagena and Barranquilla.

There was another wave of German immigrants at the end of the 19th and beginning of 20th century following the outbreak of both world wars and internal conflicts in Germany. It was during this time that Germans began leaving their mark in various Colombian industries, most notably Brewery and Aviation. Such is the case of Leo Siegfried Kopp, the founder of the famous Bavaria Brewery, who at one point the second largest brewery in South America before merging many years later. Another case was the Sociedad Colombo-Alemana de Transportes Aéreos or SCADTA, a Colombian-German air transport corporation which was cofounded by German expatriates in 1919 and became the first commercial airline in the Americas.

German immigrants and their descendants established cultural associations and educational institutions to preserve their language and traditions. These included the Colegio Alemán de Barranquilla, founded in 1912, the Colegio Andino in Bogotá, established in 1922, and the German School of Cali, founded in 1935. The German community in Barranquilla also established the Club Alemán in 1904, which became an important center for social and cultural activities.

After the rise of Adolf Hitler and the Nazi Party to power in Germany in 1933, members this party began to form of a German immigrant community in Colombia and becoming affiliated with the Auslandsorganisation der NSDAP (AO), also known as the foreign organization of the Nazi Party who managed activities for German citizens living abroad. German National Socialist groups were established in several Colombian cities, particularly Barranquilla, which had one of the country's most economically influential German immigrant communities. It was during this time that German businesses, cultural associations, schools along with social clubs in Colombia became increasingly exposed to the political influence of the Nazi government in Germany, most notably the formation of Nazi youth clubs. Nazi agitators in Colombia such as Barranquilla based businessman Emil Prüfert, ran an important instrument of Nazi propaganda in the Americas through the German-language periodical Karibischer Beobachter (Caribbean Observer), which began publication in Barranquilla on first of January 1937. The magazine was part of a wider propaganda network intended to maintain the political and cultural attachment of Germans living outside the Reich.

In 1941, the United States government estimated that there were around 5,000 German citizens living in the Caribbean region of Colombia. Several thousand more joined their ranks in Colombia's burgeoning cities. U.S. intelligence began growing concerned with growing German community in Colombia, as the country had both a notable nazi presence and a strategic geographical location near the Panama Canal. This prompted the Colombian government to close down nazi affiliated schools and clubs.

Many of these German families remained in Colombia after the war, while later generations continued to participate in Colombian economic, cultural, and social life. The German organization Stiftung Verbundenheit mit den Deutschen im Ausland or the Foundation for Connectedness with Germans Abroad, estimates that there about 1,500,000 Colombians of German descent today, roughly about 3% of the Population.

== German immigration to Santander ==
German immigration was of great importance in the Santander region. From the arrival of the engineer Geo von Lengerke to the contributions to the cattle industry by Enrique and Aurelio Gast, who were outstanding cattle breeders in Santander and helped establish this region as a national reference in this industry.

Eduardo Gast, Aurelio's son, was a well-known reference and pioneer breeder of the beefmaster breed in Colombia. The recently built event center for livestock fairs and exhibitions in Socorro, Santander, was named after him in 2021 to honor his legacy and contributions to the region's cattle industry.

Augusto Gast made important contributions to the medical and scientific community in Colombia. He graduated as a surgeon from the National University of Colombia, directed the Carlos Finlay Institute for more than 12 years and was part of the National Institute of Health. His participation was definitive in establishing in Colombia the viscerotomy program for the diagnosis of yellow fever. In recognition of his merits as a researcher, Dr. Gast represented Colombia in several international conferences on yellow fever and was a reference in the Latin American epidemiological community.

== Education ==
German schools in Colombia:

- Deutsche Schule Bogotá
- German School of Barranquilla
- Deutsche Schule / Colegio Alemán, Cali
- Deutsche Schule Medellin

== Famous German Colombians ==
- Ambrosius Ehinger
- Nikolaus Federmann
- Carlos Ardila Lülle
- Rudolf Hommes
- Aura Cristina Geithner
- María Helena Doering
- Yaneth Waldman
- Sandra Eichler
- Érika Krum
- Jennifer Steffens
- Pilar Schmitt
- Helmut Bellingrodt
- Antonio Navarro Wolff
- Carlos Lemos Simmonds
- Jacquin Strouss Lucena
- Leopold Rother
- Marino Klinger
- Roberto Gerlein
- Carlos Lehder
- Augusto Gast
- Justus Schottelius
- Ernest Guhl Nimtz
- Guillermo Hoenigsberg
- Hilda Strauss
- Otto Greiffestein
- Leo Siegfried Kopp
- Alejandro Brand
- Juan Bernardo Elbers
- Jacob Benjamin Wiesner Heckerin
- Reginaldo Paschke
- Enrique Haeusler
- Otto de Greiff Haeusler
- Reginaldo Wolff
- William Wolff
- Carlos Bimberg
- Ricardo Goerke
- Guillermo Schnurbusch
- Peter Paul von Bauer
- Alfred Hettner
- Emil Grosse
- Robert Scheibe-Vater
- Gerhard Masur
- Fritz Karsen
- Franz J. Mehr
- Juan Herkath
- Hermann Halberstädter
- Edwin Graus

== See also ==
- Colombia–Germany relations
- German Argentines
- German Americans
- German Brazilians
- German Canadians
- German Chileans
- German Mexicans
- German inventors and discoverers
- Germans
- Mennonites in Colombia
- White Latin Americans
