= María Alejandra López =

Colombian model and beauty queen (born 1994)

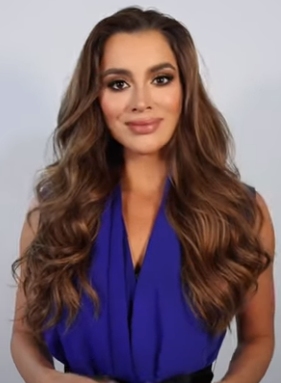
- María López in 2023
- Born: María Alejandra López Pérez; September 2, 1994 (age 32); Pereira, Risaralda, Colombia
- Education: Sergio Arboleda University
- Height: 1.76 m (5 ft 9 1/2 in)
- Beauty pageant titleholder
- Major competitions: Miss Colombia 2013; (2nd Runner-Up); Reina Hispanoamericana 2013; (Winner); Miss Mundo Colombia 2015; (Winner); Miss World 2015; (Unplaced); Miss Universe Colombia 2021; (1st Runner-Up); Miss Grand Colombia 2023; (Winner); Miss Grand International 2023; (2nd Runner-Up); Miss Universe Colombia 2026; (Winner); Miss Universe 2026; (TBD)

María Alejandra López Pérez (born September 2, 1994) is a Colombian model and beauty pageant titleholder who won Reina Hispanoamericana 2013, Miss Mundo Colombia 2015, Miss Grand Colombia 2023, and Miss Universe Colombia 2026. She represented Colombia in several international beauty pageants, including Miss Grand International 2023, where she placed second runner-up. She will represent the country in Miss Universe 2026.

== Early life and education ==
López was born in 1994 in Pereira, Risaralda, Colombia. She studied industrial engineering on a scholarship at the Sergio Arboleda University.

== Pageantry ==
=== 2013: Miss Colombia and regional competitions ===
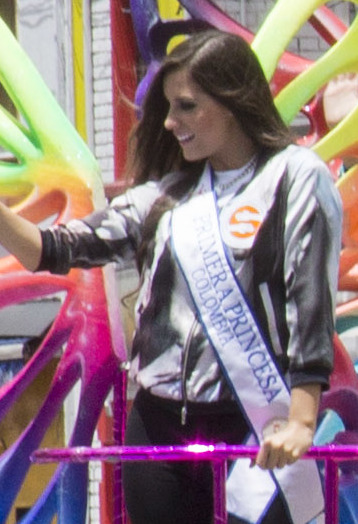
López in 2014 as the second runner-up of Miss Colombia 2013

López first represented Risaralda at Miss Colombia 2013. During the challenges leading up to the finals, she won the Jolie Face award, customarily awarded to the most photogenic candidate. In the finals, she achieved scores of 9.6 in ball gown and 9.8 in swimsuit, placing her in the Top 5 of the competition. She would place as the second runner-up, being awarded the title Primera Princesa (transl. First Princess). The winner of the edition was Paulina Vega, from Atlántico, who would later become Miss Universe 2014.

In December 2013, López represented Colombia at Reina Hispanoamericana, where she won, becoming the third Colombian to win the title. Together with the main title, she also won two sub-contests: Best Hair and Best Figure. In December 2014, she represented her country again at Miss Caraibes Hibiscus, where she won the second title for her country.

=== 2015: Miss World ===
In 2015, López represented Risaralda at Miss Mundo Colombia. During the preliminary competition, she won six special awards. At the end of the event, she won the main title, marking the second title for her department and designating her as the Colombian delegate for Miss World 2015.

At Miss World, she did not qualify for the Top 20.

=== 2021–2026: Miss Universe Colombia and Miss Grand International ===
López represented Risaralda at Miss Universe Colombia 2021, where she placed as the first runner-up to Valeria Ayos from Cartagena.

López then represented Eje Cafetero at Miss Grand Colombia 2023. Her preliminary performance earned her one special award. During the finals, she won the competition, marking Eje Cafetero's first title in the pageant's history. She represented her country at Miss Grand International 2023, where she placed as the second runner-up to Luciana Fuster of Peru.

In 2026, López competed at Miss Universe Colombia for the second time, representing Risaralda. She went on to win the title, marking the first title for her department and designating her as the Colombian delegate for Miss Universe 2026.

Awards and achievements
Preceded by Vanessa Pulgarin (Antioquia)	Miss Universe Colombia; 2026	Incumbent
Preceded by Andina Julie (Indonesia)	Miss Grand International 2nd Runner-Up; 2023	Succeeded by Amy Viranya Berry (United Kingdom)
Preceded by Priscilla Londono (Texas)	Miss Grand Colombia; 2023	Succeeded by Maria Angelica Valero (Norte de Santander)
Preceded by Brigitte Golabkan (Guadeloupe)	Miss Caraïbes Hibiscus; 2014	Succeeded by Karla Peniche (Mexico)
Preceded by Jessica Garcia (Nariño)	Miss Mundo Colombia; 2015	Succeeded by Shirley Atehortua (Risaralda)
Preceded by Sarodj Bertin (Haiti)	Reina Hispanoamericana; 2013	Succeeded by Romina Rocamonje (Bolivia)
