= Miss Grand Colombia 2023 =

3rd Miss Grand Colombia competition, beauty pageant edition

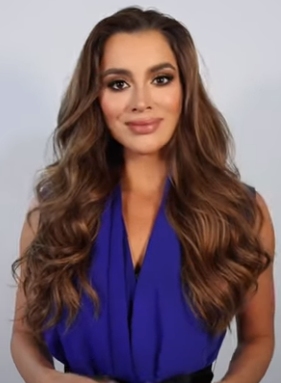
- María López, the winner of the contest
- Date: June 18, 2023
- Presenters: Lees Garcia; Manuela Restrepo
- Venue: Mayor Auditorium CUN, Bogotá, Colombia
- Broadcaster: Canal 1, YouTube
- Entrants: 23
- Placements: 12
- Debuts: Amazonas; Antioquia; Armenia; Bogotá; Bolívar; Bucaramanga; Cali; Cauca; Chile; Cundinamarca; Eje Cafetero; Europe; Medellín; Meta; Miami; Nariño; Panama; Quindío; Risaralda; Santander; Valle del Cauca; Washington, D.C.
- Returns: Zona Andina
- Winner: María Alejandra López (Eje Cafetero)

External videos
- Miss Grand Colombia 2023 Grand Final Competition, on June 18, 2023, YouTube video

Miss Grand Colombia 2023 was the third edition of the Miss Grand Colombia pageant, held on June 18, 2023, at the Mayor Auditorium CUN located in the country's capital city, Bogotá D.C. Candidates from twenty-three Colombian departments and oversea communities competed for the title, of whom, an industrial engineer representing Eje Cafetero, María Alejandra López, was announced the winner and crowned by Miss Grand Colombia 2022, Priscilla Londoño. As Miss Grand Colombia 2023, she represent her country at Miss Grand International 2023 held in Ho Chi Minh City, Vietnam, where she was named the 2nd runner-up.

The grand final of the pageant was broadcast to the audience nationwide via a state-owned television channel, Canal 1, and was hosted by Lees Garcia Miss Grand International 2014 and Manuela Restrepo Miss Teen Colombia 2022/23.

== Selection of contestants ==
The national candidates for Miss Grand Colombia 2023 were chosen by either the national organizer or regional licensees; however, most of them were appointed, and only one sub-national pageant, Miss Grand Colombia in Europe, has been held. Still, the winner of such a contest later resigned from the title, which caused the organizer, AIHME Association (Italian-Hispanic Association of Women Entrepreneurs Emigrants in Europe), to appoint the 1st runner-up as the replacement.

Of the central organizer-selected candidates, each of them was later assigned to represent one of the country's administrative divisions that lacked a regional licensee.

The following table is the details of the 2023 Miss Grand Colombia's sub-national contest

Host state	Pageant	Edition	Date & Venue	Entrants	Ref.
Italy	Miss Grand Colombia en Europa	1st	June 3 at the AEGUA Disco Club, Varazze, Savona, Italy	5	

== Competition ==
At the grand final competition held on June 18, 2023, at the Mayor Auditorium CUN, Bogotá, the top 12 and top 6 finalists who were determined through all pre-final activities which included the preliminary competition held one day earlier, were announced after finishing the opening show, swimsuit parade, and the evening gown show. In the final 6 rounds, all qualified contestants were then asked the same question and the panel of judges scored each of them based on their answers, three contestants with the highest given scores qualified for the final 3 rounds, in which, the two runners-up and the winner of the contest were decided based on the accumulated scores from all previous rounds.

== Result ==
Miss Grand Colombia 2023 competition result by department/city/etc.
Color key:
Winner	First runner-up	Second runner-up
Top 6	Top 12	Unplaced
Did not participate
Representative determined but did not compete

=== Main placement ===
Placement	Contestant
Miss Grand Colombia 2023	Eje Cafetero – María Alejandra López
1st runner-up	Meta – Yuri Rey
2nd runner-up	Zona Andina – Valentina Cárdenas
Top 6	Panama – Diana Sandoval; Risaralda – Maria Jose Villegas; Washington, D.C. – Sasha Perea
Top 12	Antioquia – Valeria Gutierrez; Armenia – Angela Gonzales; Bolívar – Jania Lucia Viano Polo; Bucaramanga – Andrea Motta; Cundinamarca – Daniela Mejía; Europe – Aischa Vargas Duran

=== Special awards ===
Award	Delegate
Miss Elegance	Antioquia – Valeria Gutierrez
Miss Photogenic	Meta – Yuri Rey
Miss Congeniality	Amazonas – Catalina Cabrera Jimenez
Best Face	Zona Andina – Valentina Cárdenas
Best Skin	Eje Cafetero – María Alejandra López
Best Smile	Meta – Yuri Rey
Best Curve	Panama communities – Diana Sandoval
Best in Swimsuit	Meta – Yuri Rey
Best Evening Gown	Panama communities – Diana Sandoval
Queen of Journalists	Meta – Yuri Rey
Make-up Challenge Winner	(Washington, D.C.) Washington, D.C. communities – Sasha Perea

== Candidates ==
Originally, twenty-five candidates confirmed to participate, but two candidates, including Dayana Cárdenas Mestraof the Cesar, and Sophia Ortiz of Barranquilla, withdrew from the competition for health issues, making the finalized total of twenty-three contestants.

Department/District	Contestant	Placement
Amazonas	Catalina Cabrera Jimenez	
Antioquia	Valeria Gutierrez	Top 12
Armenia	Angela Gonzales	Top 12
Bogotá	Valentina Bermudez	
Bolívar	Jania Lucia Viano Polo	Top 12
Bucaramanga	Andrea Motta	Top 12
Cali	Yamileth Delgado	
Cauca	Maria Alejandra Millan	
Colombian communities in Chile	Katherin Aguilar Castillo	
Colombian communities in Europe	Aischa Vargas Duran	Top 12
Colombian communities in Miami	Maria Camila Medina	
Colombian communities in Panama	Diana Sandoval	Top 6
(Washington, D.C.) Colombian communities in Washington, D.C.	Sasha Perea	Top 6
Cundinamarca	Daniela Mejía	Top 12
(Colombia) Eje Cafetero	María Alejandra López	Miss Grand Colombia 2023
Medellín	Camila Medellín	
Meta	Yuri Rey	1st Runner-Up
Nariño	Lina María Santacruz	
Quindío	Vanessa Fandiño	
Risaralda	Maria Jose Villegas	Top 6
Santander	Lizeth Montañez	
Valle del Cauca	Emily Pulido	
(Colombia) Zona Andina	Valentina Cárdenas	2nd Runner-Up
