= Sinú River =

River in Colombia

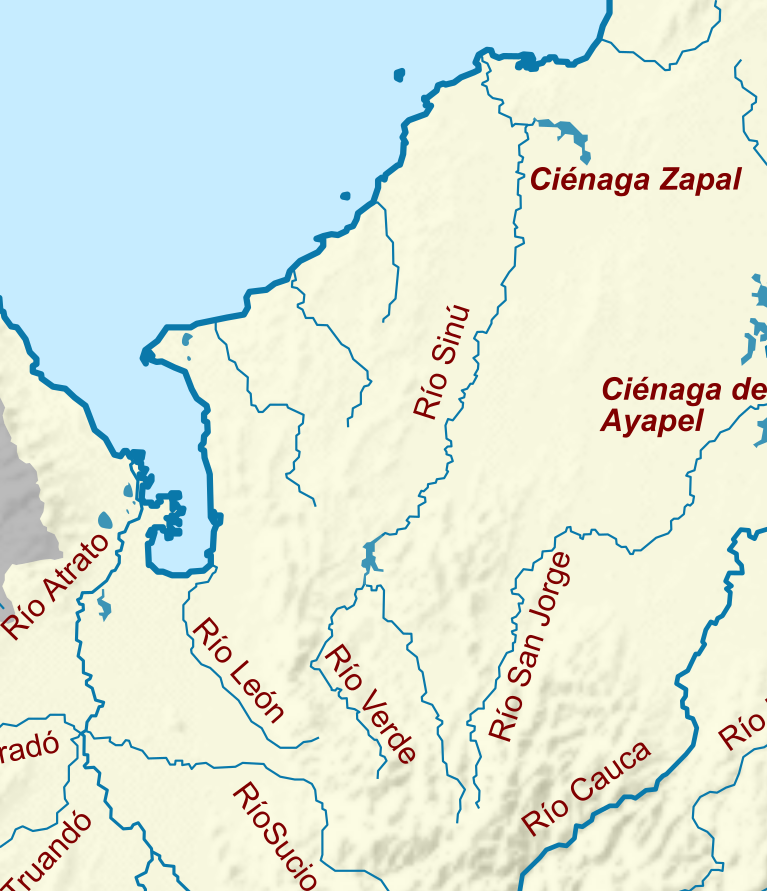
Sinú river in the northwest of Colombia

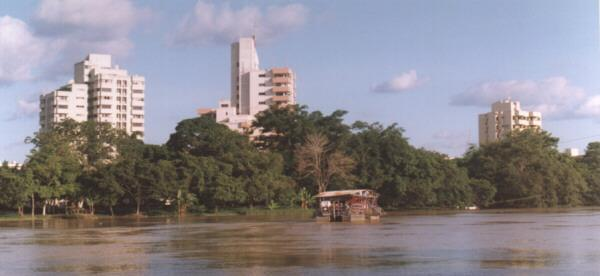
Sinú River flowing by the city of Montería

Sinú River (Spanish: Río Sinú), is a river in northwestern Colombia that flows mostly through the Córdoba Department and into the Caribbean. It is the third most important river in the Caribbean Region, after the Magdalena River and the Cauca River. It is born in the Antioquia Department, flowing south to north for 415 kilometres (258 mi) until flowing into the Caribbean Sea. The river is navigable for only half of its length, 200 kilometres (120 mi) starting in Montería, the largest city in its basin. Also, this river is the main tourist attraction of Montería decorated with the first avenue when it passes by Montería.

The river flows between the eastern and middle prongs of the Cordillera Occidental.

== Ecology ==
The river flows through the Sinú Valley dry forests ecoregion. In general, the aquatic fauna shows connections with the Magdalena–Cauca River basin, but also the Atrato River basin. There has been extensive habitat destruction in the region, causing problems to many species in the area. Two parrots that are endemic to the river valley, the Sinú brown-throated parakeet (Aratinga pertinax griseipecta) and the Sinú parakeet (Pyrrhura picta subandina), have not been recorded for decades and are feared extinct.

== Urra Dam ==
The Urra Dam built by the company Urrá is on the Sinú River.
