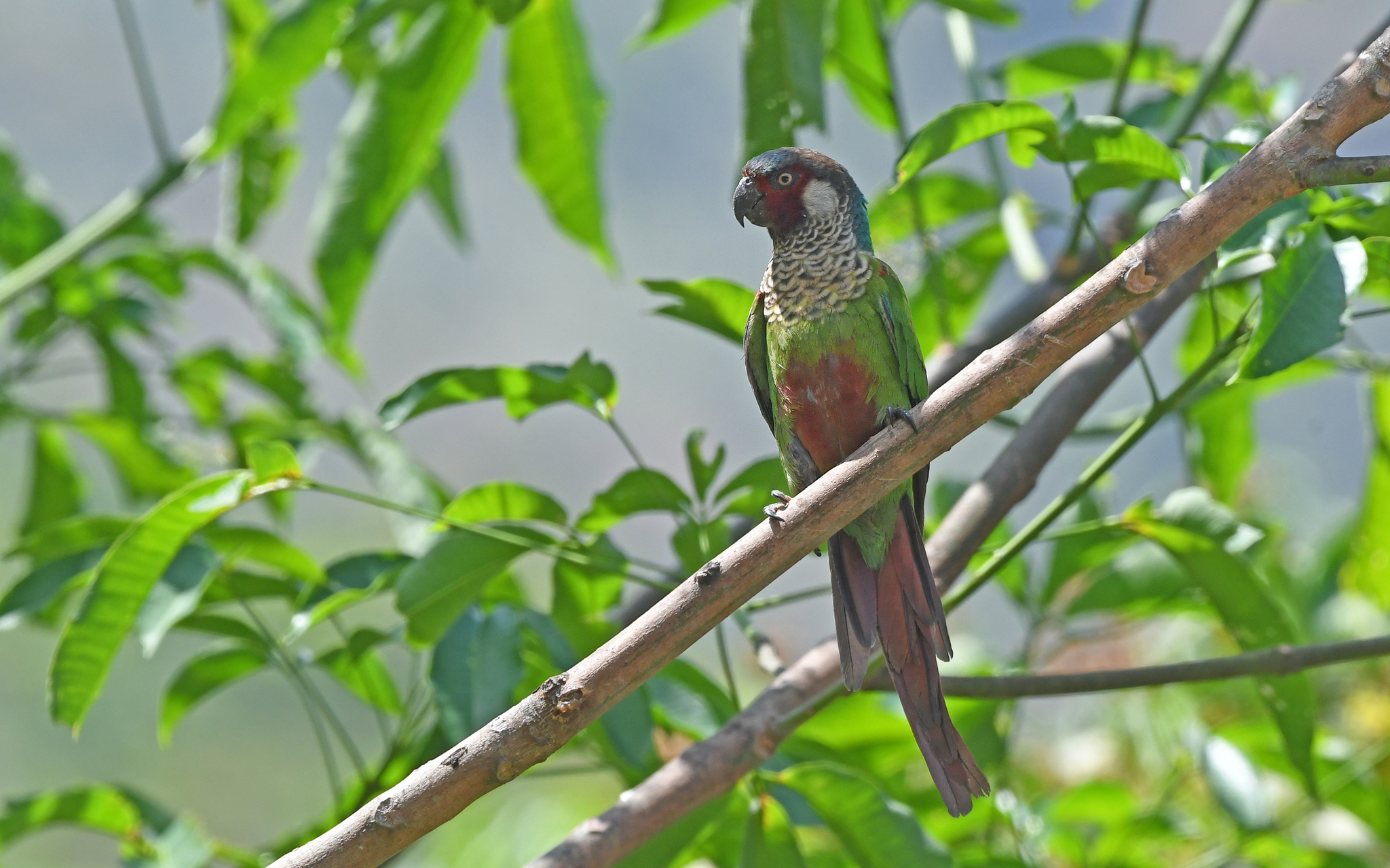

Conservation status
- Endangered (IUCN 3.1)

Scientific classification
- Kingdom: Animalia
- Phylum: Chordata
- Class: Aves
- Order: Psittaciformes
- Family: Psittacidae
- Genus: Pyrrhura
- Species: P. caeruleiceps

Binomial name
- Pyrrhura caeruleiceps Todd, 1947

Subspecies
- P. c. caeruliceps P. c. pantchenko
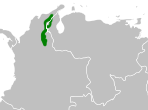
- Approximate range of P. caeruleiceps

= Perija parakeet =

Species of parrot

The Perija parakeet (Pyrrhura caeruleiceps), also known as Todd's parakeet or in aviculture as Perijá conure, is a species of parrot in the family Psittacidae. There are about 1,000 to 2,499 mature individuals remaining in the wild as of 2021 with a decreasing population trend. In 2001, the Perija parakeet was reclassified from a subspecies of the painted parakeet to an individual species. There are two subspecies of the Perija parakeet, P. c. caeruliceps and P. c. pantchenko. P. c. caeruliceps lives in Serranía del Perijá mountains on the northern border between Colombia and Venezuela. P. c. pantchenko lives in the Perijá Mountains.
