= German School of Barranquilla =

German International School

- Spanish: Colegio Alemán de Barranquilla; German: Deutsche Schule Barranquilla
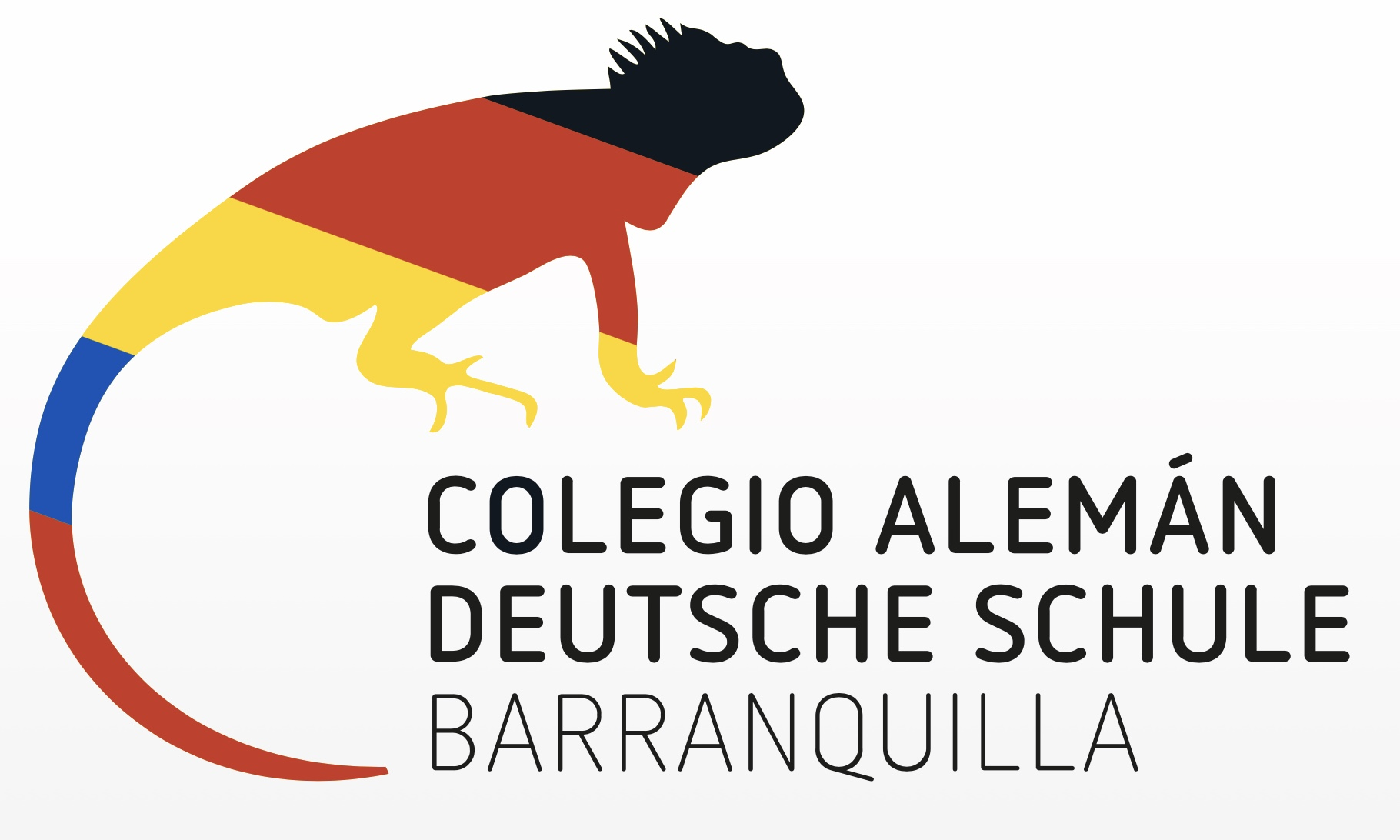

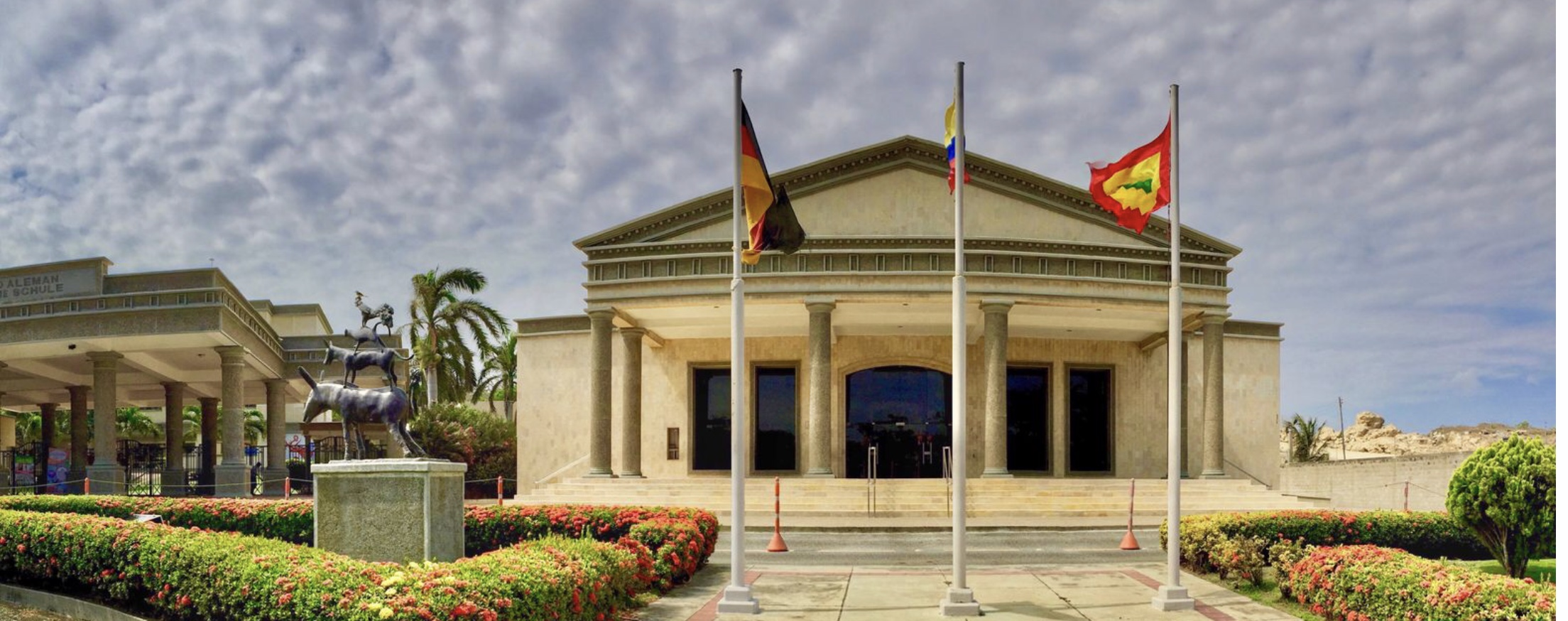

Information
- Established: 1913; 113 years ago
- Grades: Nursery - Grade 12
- Age: 3 to 18
- Enrollment: 345 (1957)
- Language: Spanish (currently); German (formerly)

German School of Barranquilla (Spanish: Colegio Alemán de Barranquilla, German: Deutsche Schule Barranquilla) is a private German international school in Barranquilla, Colombia. It is a German School of excellence abroad, that is officially sponsored by the Federal Republic of Germany. It is the oldest German school in Colombia, and one of the only two schools in the Colombian Caribbean coast that offer an IB Diploma, or the International Baccalaureate program. The School serves nursery, which starts when children are 3 years old, kindergarten, primary (grades 1-6), and senior high school (grades 7-12). The institution offers a 3-6 month exchange program in Germany (when students reach Grade 10), and Summer Camps to improve language immersion.

The main instructional language is Spanish. As of circa 2015 under 1% of students are native German speakers.

== History ==
The school first opened on February 9, 1913, making it the oldest German school in Colombia. Its first facility was a tenement building in the center of Barranquilla, and initially the school used rented facilities. It moved into its own building in 1930.

The school originally used German as the language of instruction, and it used a German-Spanish bilingual program. In 1940 the pre-World War II school reached its peak student population of 253. 65% of the students were Colombians, 26% were Germans, and the remaining 9% were of different nationalities.

It closed in 1942 due to political reasons stemming from World War II, it did not reopen until 1956. In the interim there were secret classes held at the Colegio del Prado. When the school officially reopened with 255 students, it became a Spanish-medium school, while German was only an academic subject. Students were required to use the Colombian curriculum. In 1957 the student body increased to 345. The first post-war teachers from Germany came in 1959. In 1961 an inspection committee from West Germany looked at the school. That year the first post-war graduates finished their studies. In October 1961 the National Ministry of Education officially acknowledged the German School of Barranquilla.

The West German government eventually canceled its financial aid till since German was no longer the medium of instruction. It did, however, give financial aid to the construction of the building which opened in 1963.

In the 2000s the school moved to its current location, midway between the center of Barranquilla and the center of Puerto Colombia.

== Curriculum ==
The main instructional language is Spanish. The German language is offered as a subject from nursery to grade 12, and the school offers Levels I and II of the German Language Exams. German is used as a medium of instruction in some electives, Biology and History and advanced Math classes. English classes are taught in English. Students also graduate with an IB Diploma and a Cambridge Certificate ranging from levels B2 to C1.

== Amenities ==
The School offers several places of recreation and learning for its students.

=== Sports ===
The German School of Barranquilla has a Sports Center that offers space for mixed sports, a Gym, a Volleyball and a Basketball court. The school offers a beach volleyball court, a synthetic football field, a dance studio, multiple table tennis tables, an Olympic-size swimming pool and Track and field, among others.

=== Music ===
The school counts with and Auditorium for the use of several performing arts, a Youth Symphony Orchestra, Multilingual Choruses, multiple music classrooms fully equipped, among others, which are fully available for any student interested.

== See also ==
- German Colombian
