= Deutsche Schule Bogotá =

German international school in Colombia

- Colegio Andino
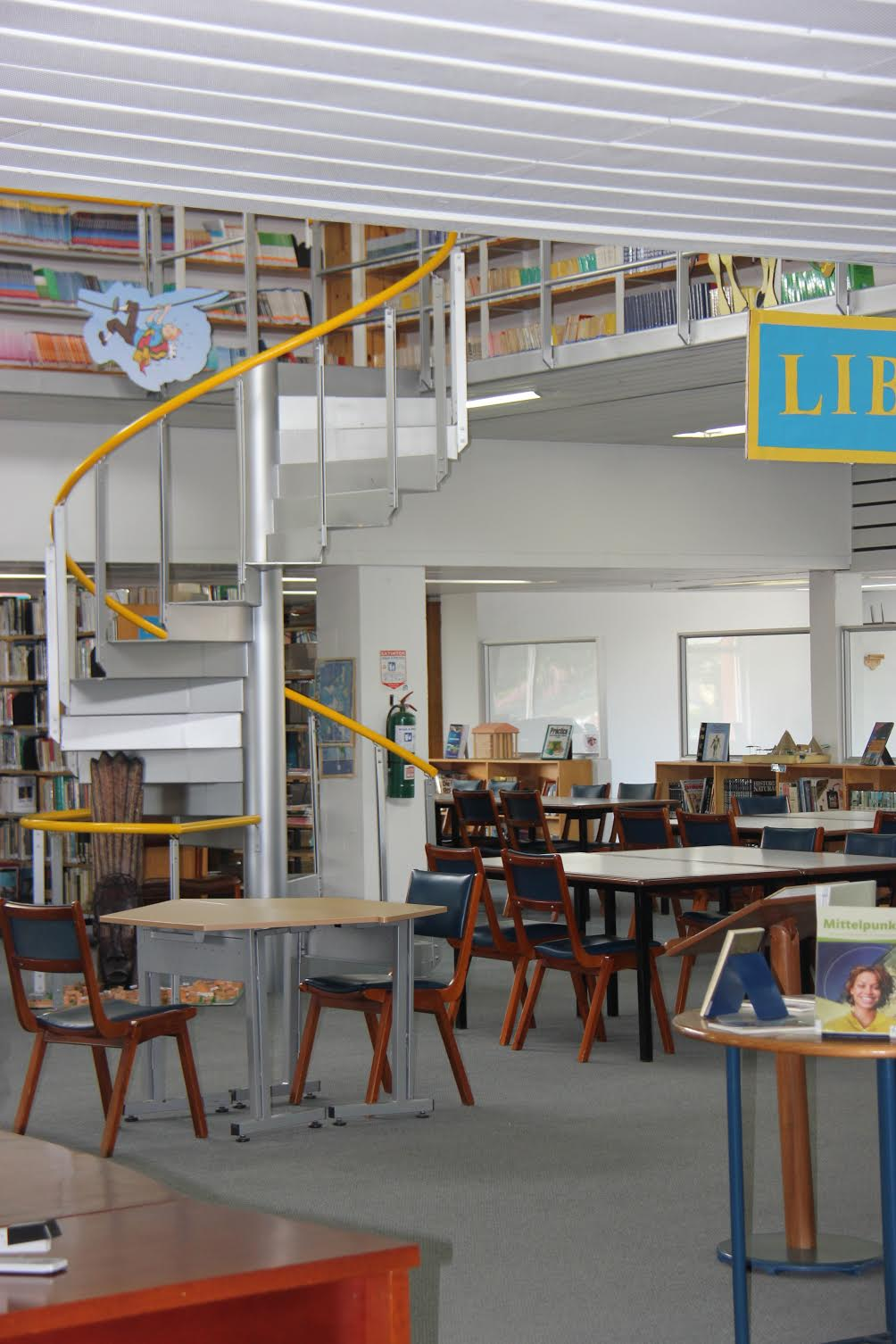
- School library of the Colegio Andino in Bogotá

Location
- Carrera 51 No. 218-85; Bogotá; Colombia; 4.7953°N 74.0483°W

Information
- Type: German international school
- Established: February 1922
- Founders: Anton Kraus, Elisabeth Schrader
- Headmaster: Frank Müller
- Grades: K - 12
- Language: Spanish, German
- Hours in school day: 9
- Website: www.colegioandino.edu.co

Deutsche Schule Bogotá (Spanish: Colegio Andino) is a private German international school in Bogotá, Colombia. It serves levels Kindergarten through Bachillerato/Sekundarstufe (senior high school). It received the commandment "Cruz de Boyacá".

== See also ==
- German Colombians
