= Sinú Valley dry forests =

Sinu Valley of North Colombia

Sinú Valley dry forests (NT0229)
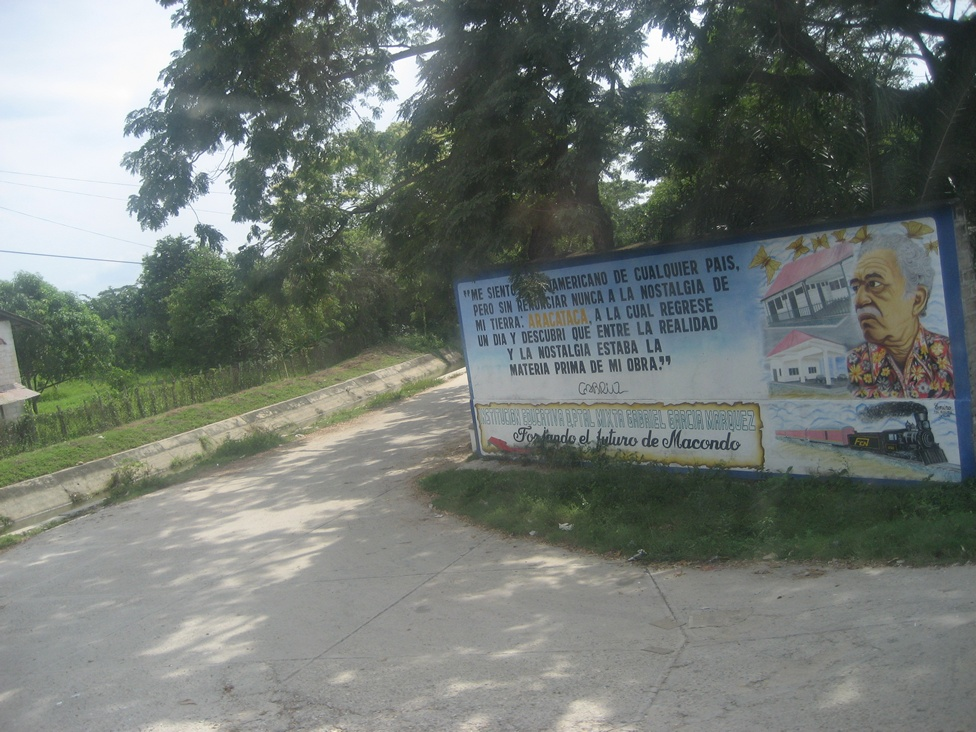
- Scene in Aracataca

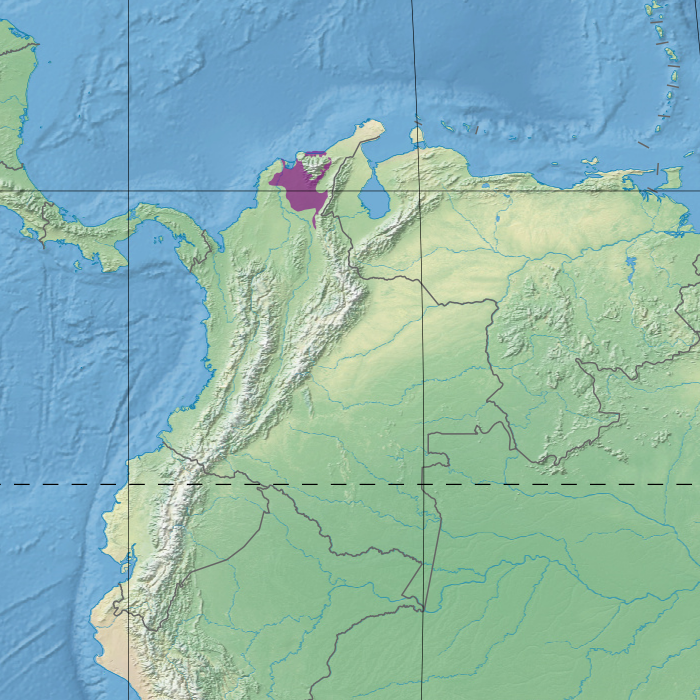
- Ecoregion territory (in purple)

Ecology
- Realm: Neotropical
- Biome: Tropical and subtropical dry broadleaf forests

Geography
- Area: 25,123 km^{2} (9,700 sq mi)
- Countries: Colombia
- Coordinates: 9.892°N 74.166°W
- Geology: Middle, Lower Magdalena Valley, Cesar-Ranchería, Sinú-San Jacinto Basins
- Rivers: Sinú, Cesar, Magdalena
- Climate type: Aw: equatorial, winter dry

The Sinú Valley dry forests (NT0229) is an ecoregion in the north of Colombia. (Note: The WWF's WildFinder application shows the ecoregion as lying to the east of the Magdalena River. A similar map is given in Land Cover Change in Colombia ... (2012). However, the Sinú River runs well to the west of the Magdalena River. The WWF description of ecoregion NT0229 generally describes the diverse environment of the Sinú River valley, although the section on "Justification of Ecoregion Delineation" matches the WildFinder map, for example saying it is "flanked by the Cordillera Oriental of the northern Andes to the east". A clue to resolving the discrepancy may be given by a map, apparently from a report on the Coffee Cultural Landscape of Colombia, that shows the Sinú Valley dry forests ecoregion extending from the lower Sinú Valley east to the Cordillera Oriental, including the north part of the Magdalena-Urabá moist forests as shown on the WildFinder map.)

== Geography ==
=== Location ===
The Sinú Valley is an area of 2,512,288 hectares (6,208,000 acres). located within the zone of parallel, north-northeast trending hills that lies between the low-point Magdalena and the Gulf of Urabá in Northwestern Colombia.

In the north, the ecoregion surrounds the Sierra Nevada de Santa Marta and the Santa Marta montane forests ecoregion. To the north it transitions into patches of the Guajira–Barranquilla xeric scrub ecoregion, and into a section of Amazon–Orinoco–Southern Caribbean mangroves along the coast. To the southeast it transitions into the Cordillera Oriental montane forests ecoregion and in the south meets the Magdalena Valley montane forests ecoregion. To the southwest it transitions into the Magdalena–Urabá moist forests ecoregion.

=== Climate ===
At a sample location at coordinates 10.25°N 74.25°W the Köppen climate classification is "Tropical wet and dry or savanna (Aw)". Mean temperatures range from 26.9 °C (80.4 °F) in October to 28.4 °C (83.1 °F) in March and April. Total annual rainfall is about 1,490 millimetres (59 in). There is a dry season with little rainfall from December to March. The rest of months lack a strict pattern of rainfall, except for the peak of October which has a rainfall mean that is very high compared to the rest of the year. Monthly rainfall ranges from 24.8 millimetres (0.98 in) in December to 241.5 millimetres (9.51 in) in October.

== Ecology ==
The ecoregion is in the neotropical realm, in the tropical and subtropical dry broadleaf forests biome.

=== Fauna ===
Endangered mammals include black-headed spider monkey (Ateles fusciceps), Geoffroy's spider monkey (Ateles geoffroyi) and red-crested tree-rat (Santamartamys rufodorsalis).

== Status ==
The World Wildlife Fund gives the ecoregion the status of "Critical/Endangered".

== Notes and references ==
=== References ===
==== Bibliography ====
- Coffee Cultural Landscape-Colombia: ecoregions colombia
- Constantino, Emilio, Northern South America: Northern Colombia (NT0229), WWF: World Wildlife Fund
- Sánchez-Cuervo, Ana María; Aide, T. Mitchell; Clark, Matthew L.; Etter, Andrés (29 August 2012), "Land Cover Change in Colombia: Surprising Forest Recovery Trends between 2001 and 2010", PLOS ONE, 7 (8) e43943, Bibcode:2012PLoSO...743943S, doi:10.1371/journal.pone.0043943, PMC 3430633, PMID 22952816
- "Sinú Valley dry forests", Global Species, Myers Enterprises II
- WildFinder, WWF: World Wildlife Fund
