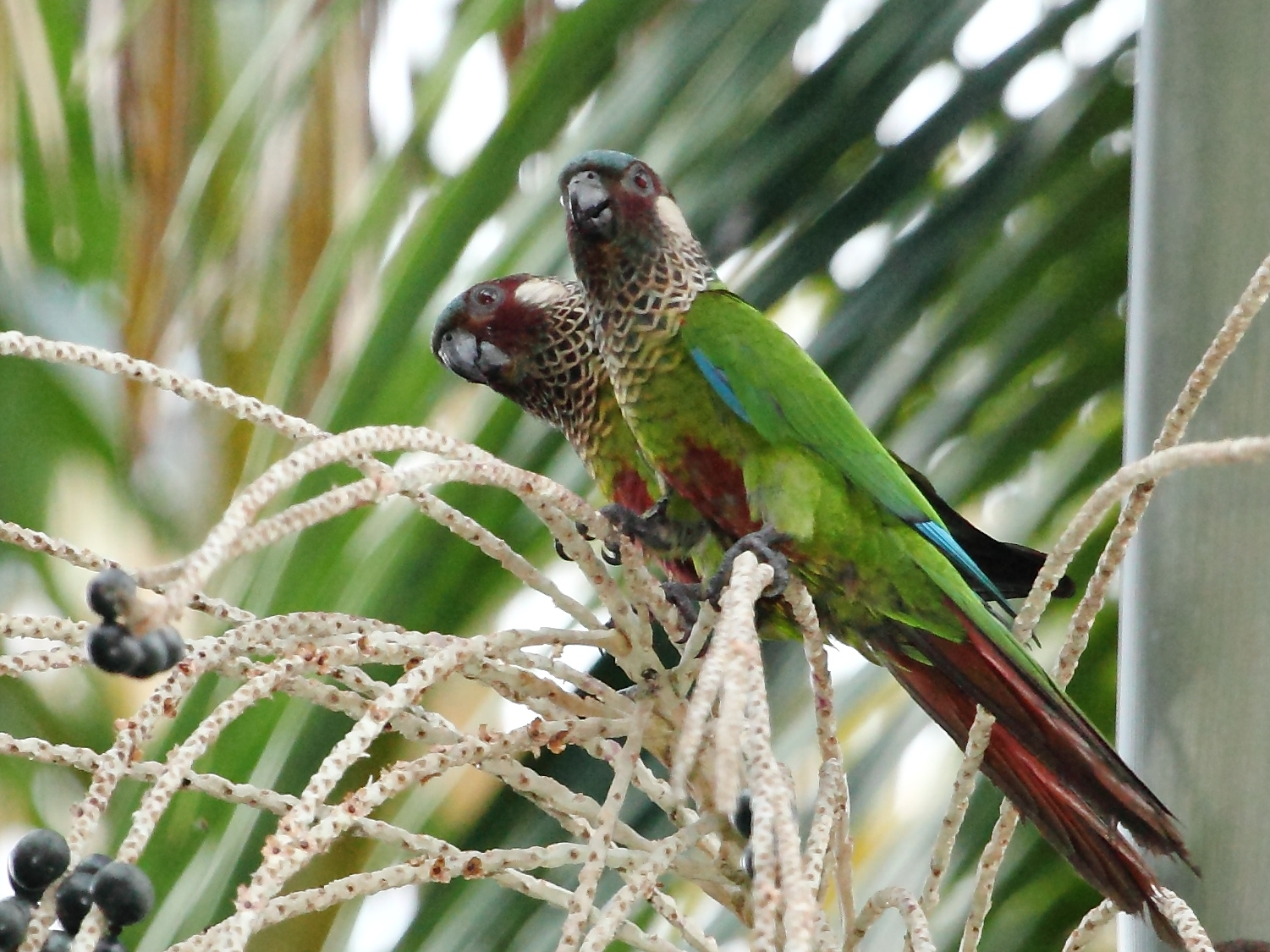

Conservation status
- Least Concern (IUCN 3.1)
- CITES Appendix II

Scientific classification
- Kingdom: Animalia
- Phylum: Chordata
- Class: Aves
- Order: Psittaciformes
- Family: Psittacidae
- Genus: Pyrrhura
- Species: P. picta

Binomial name
- Pyrrhura picta (Müller, 1776)
- Range

= Painted parakeet =

Species of bird

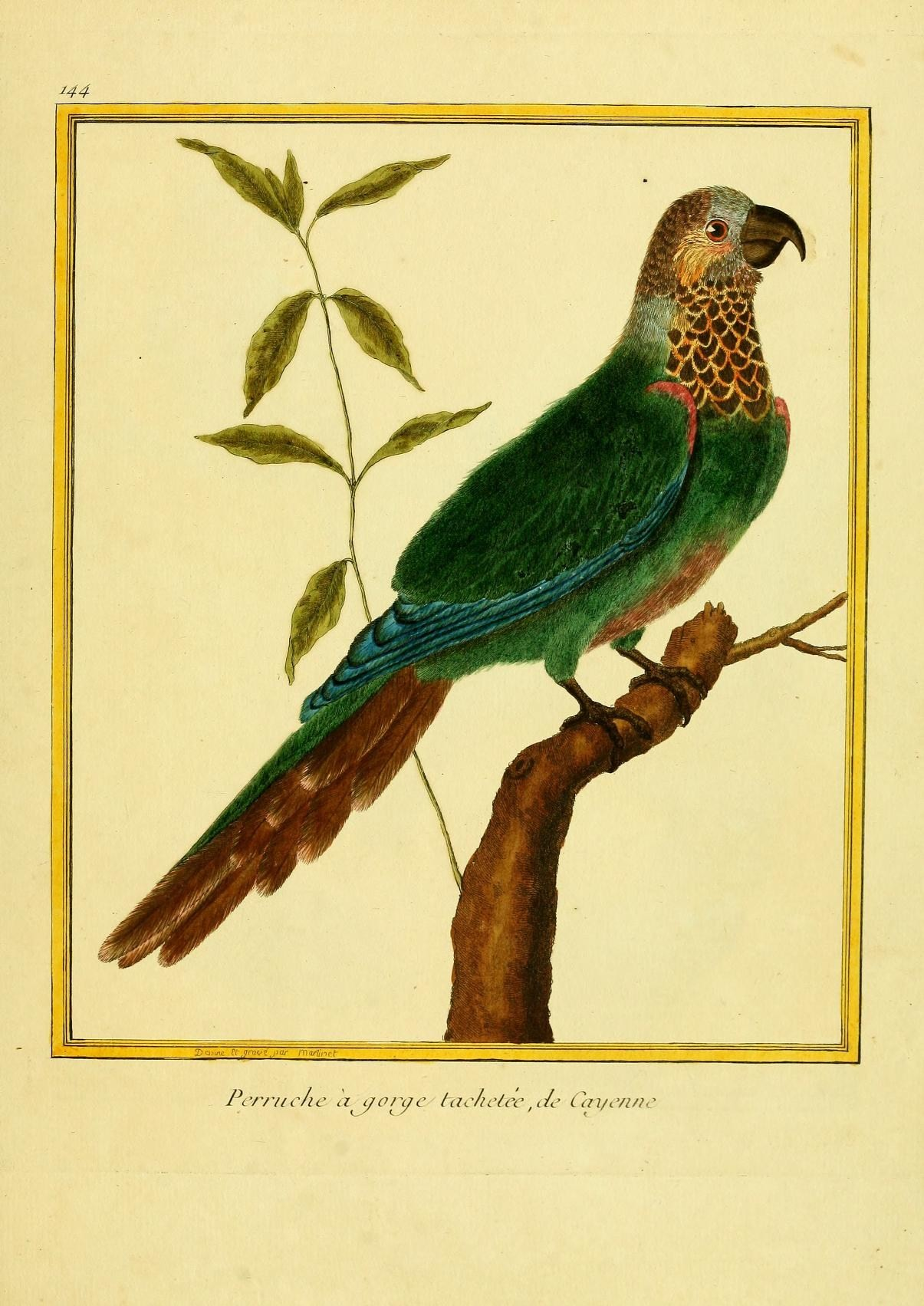
Perruche à gorge tachetée, de Cayenne. A hand-coloured engraving by François-Nicolas Martinet which Philipp Statius Müller probably used for his short description.

The painted parakeet (Pyrrhura picta), known as the painted conure in aviculture, is a species of bird in subfamily Arinae of the family Psittacidae, the African and New World parrots. It is found in northeastern South America.

== Taxonomy ==
The painted parakeet was described in 1776 as Psittacus pictus by the German zoologist Philipp Statius Müller. Müller gave the locality as Cayenne, now French Guiana. Müller cited "Buffon" as the source of his information on the parakeet. Although the Comte de Buffon published a description of the "La perriche à gorge variée" in his Histoire Naturelle des Oiseaux, this was in 1779, after Müller's publication. Instead, Müller had access to the Planches Enluminées D'Histoire Naturelle, a set of hand-coloured plates engraved by François-Nicolas Martinet that were produced to accompany Buffon's work. Before Buffon, the painted parakeet had been described in 1648 as the "Anaca" by the German naturalist Georg Marcgrave and in 1760 by the French zoologist Mathurin Jacques Brisson as "La petite perruche brune du Brésil". The specific epithet pictus is from Latin meaning "painted". The painted parakeet is placed in the genus Pyrrhura that was introduced in 1856 by the French naturalist Charles Lucien Bonaparte. The species is considered to be monotypic with no subspecies being recognised.

The painted parakeet is a member a group of closely related taxa in the genus Pyrrhura for which there was much uncertainty in the number of taxa and the relationships between them. The 1997 entry for the painted parakeet in the Handbook of the Birds of the World lists nine subspecies. Of these, six are now treated as separate species, and two have been synonymized with other taxa. (Note: Of those subspecies listed by the HBW, microtera has been synonymized with amazonum, and pantchenkoi has been synonymized with caeruleiceps.) Most of the uncertainty with the taxonomy was resolved by a comprehensive molecular genetic study of the parrots by Brian Smith and collaborators that was published in 2023.

== Description ==
The painted parakeet is 20 to 23 cm (7.9 to 9.1 in) long; the nominate subspecies weighs 46 to 85 g (1.6 to 3.0 oz). The sexes are the same in all subspecies. Adults of the nominate subspecies are blue from their forehead to their hindcrown that becomes deep maroon on the hindcrown and nape. They have a narrow blue collar below the nape. Their face is maroon with a ring of bare grayish skin around the eye, and their ear coverts are whitish. Their upperparts are mostly green with a dull red lower back and rump. The sides of their neck and their breast are buff with a reddish brown scalloped appearance. The center of their belly is dull red and the rest of their underparts are green. Their wing is mostly green with a red carpal area and blue primaries. Their tail is mostly maroon with a green base. Their iris is dark. Immatures are similar to adults but without the red carpal and with a whitish eye ring.

The Perija parakeet resembles the painted parakeet but with a blue forecrown that becomes brown with a blue tinge on the hindcrown, a pale iris, pale gray-brown ear coverts, a dark red belly patch, and a maroon-red tail. The Subandean parakeet differs from the painted parakeet with a dull blue and red forehead, a bright maroon-red face, a buff and gray scalloped breast, a green carpal area (sometimes with a few red feathers), and a deep red tail.

== Distribution and habitat ==
The painted parakeet is found from southeastern Venezuela to the Guianas and northern Amazonian Brazil. It inhabits terra firme and várzea forests, forested savanna, and coastal sand-ridge forest. In elevation it mostly occurs in the lowlands but is found as high as 1,800 m (5,900 ft).

== Behavior ==
=== Movement ===
No movement pattern is known for the painted parakeet, but eisenmanni may make some small elevational changes.

=== Feeding ===
The painted parakeet feeds on fruits, seeds, and flowers of a very wide variety of plants and trees. It typically forages in flocks of up to about 30 individuals.

=== Breeding ===
The painted parakeet's breeding biology is almost unknown. The nominate subspecies breeds between December and February in the Guianas; its season has not been defined elsewhere. It nests in tree cavities, and its clutch size in captivity is four or five eggs. Subspecies P. p. caeruleiceps apparently breeds between March and September but this span possibly has two peak periods. P. p. eisenmanni apparently breeds between January and March and P. p. subandina between March and June.

=== Vocalization ===
The vocalizations of the painted parakeet vary somewhat by subspecies. The nominate's most common call is "a series of rather high-pitched, somewhat yelping notes, e.g. "kyeek kyeek kyeek" " that is given both from a perch and in flight. Perched birds also give "a more rolling "kurrek" and a subdued "kek"." However, perched birds are often silent. Flocks in flight "call frequently and simultaneously, producing a noisy, harsh and piercing chattering." Subspecies P. p. caeruleiceps makes a "series of "kurr, kurr, kurr, kurr" or "kirr, kirr, kirr, kirr" notes" when perched. The calls of P. p. eisenmanni are similar to those of the nominate but it adds "a harsh, guttural "kleek-kleek" when perched". The vocalizations of P. p. subandina have not been put into words.

== Status ==
The IUCN follows HBW taxonomy and so has separately assessed the four subspecies of painted parakeet. The nominate subspecies is considered to be of Least Concern. It has a rather large range but its population size is not known and is believed to be decreasing. No immediate threats have been identified. The "Perija" parakeet (P. p. caeruleiceps) is Endangered. It has a limited range and its estimated population of between 1000 and 2500 mature individuals is believed to be decreasing. About 70% of its original habitat has been cleared for cattle ranching and agriculture and what remains is highly fragmented. Capture for the pet trade is also believed to be a significant threat. The "Sinu" parakeet (P. p. subandina) is Critically Endangered (Possibly Extinct). There have been no documented sightings since 1949. It has a very small range and almost all of its suitable habitat has been cleared. It is thought that no more than 50 mature individuals remain if indeed it has not gone extinct. The "Azuero" parakeet (P. p. eisenmanni) was originally assessed as endangered and since 2021 as Vulnerable. It has a restricted range and its estimated population of fewer than 6000 mature individuals is believed to be decreasing. "The species is threatened by habitat loss for conversion to agricultural areas." It does occur in the largely intact Cerro Hoya National Park.
