= Cartagena, Colombia =

City in coastal northern Colombia

Cartagena
- District and city
- Cartagena de Indias
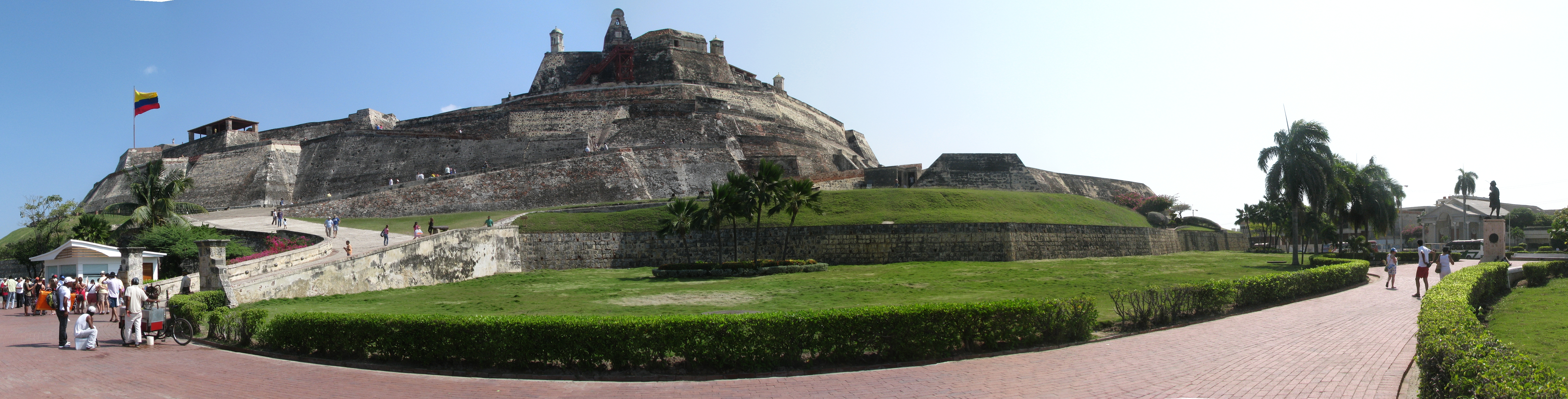
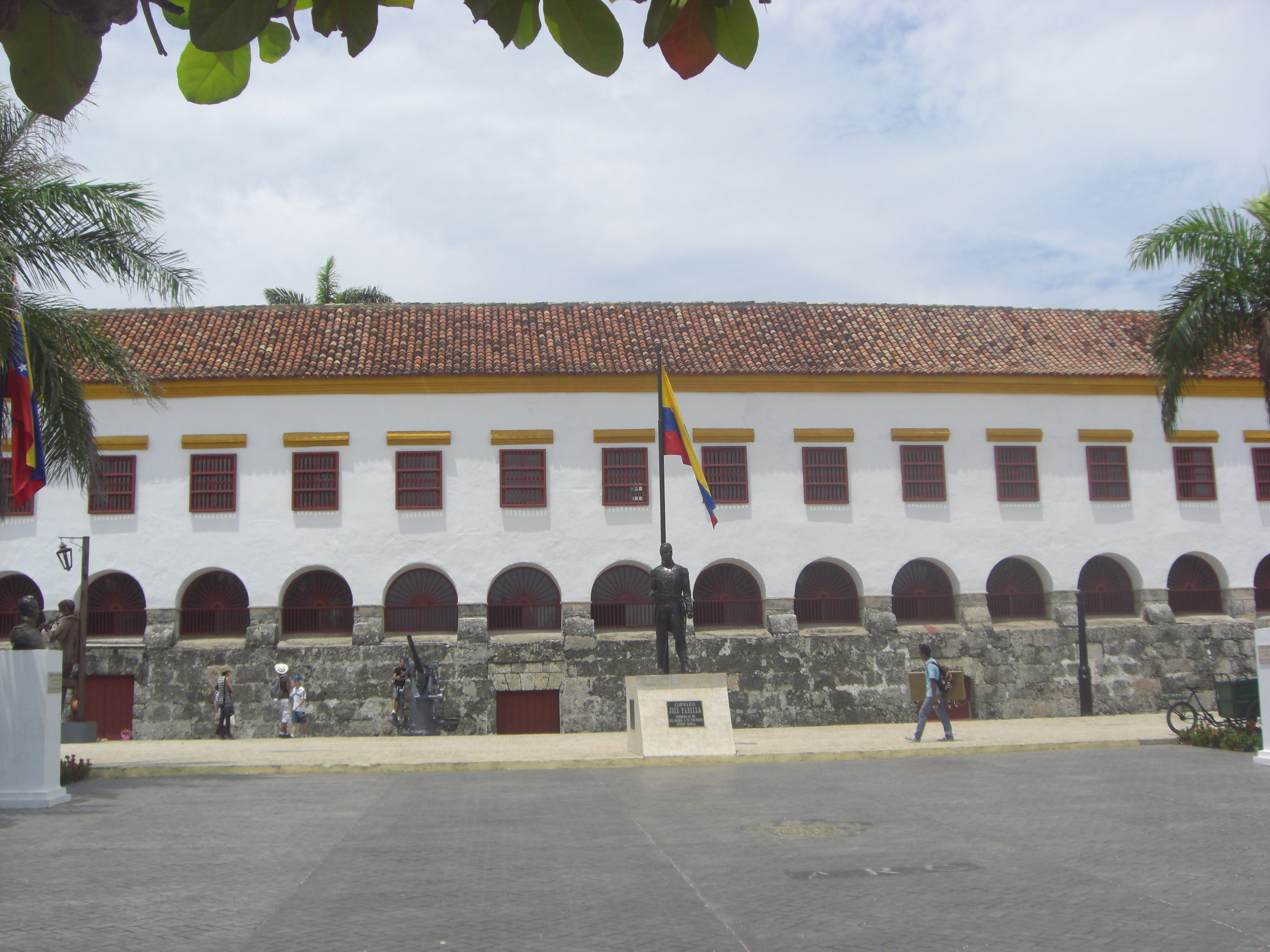
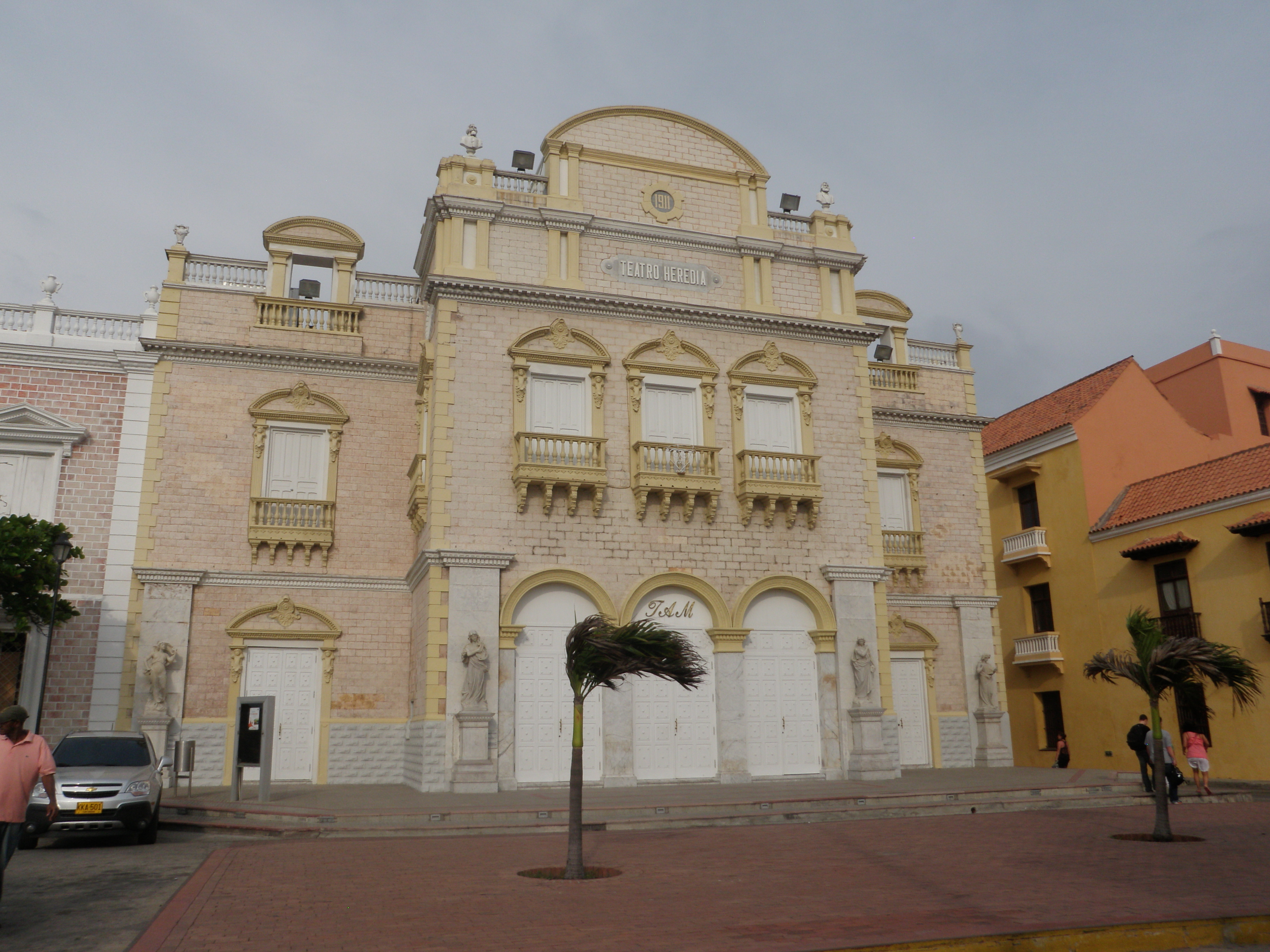
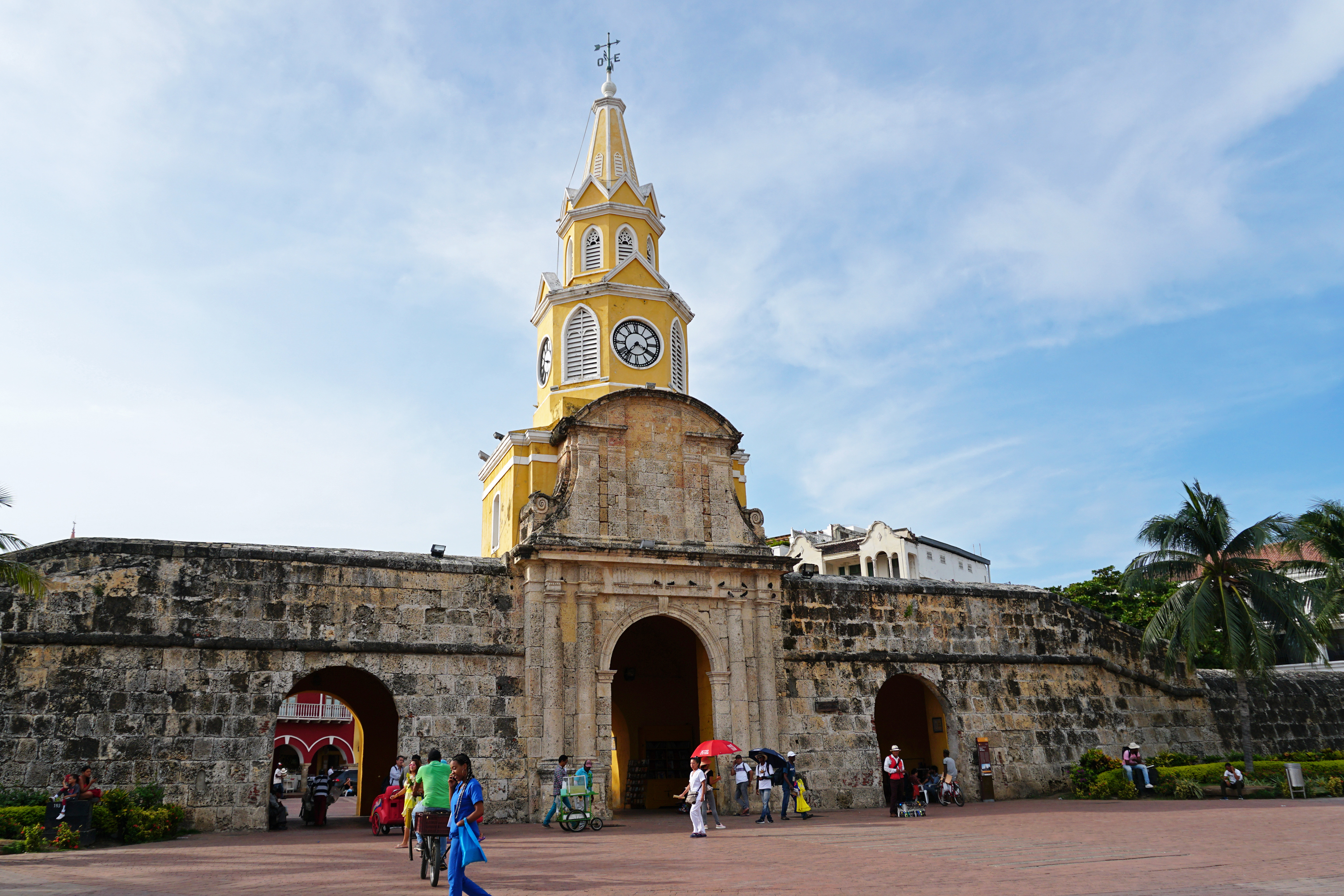
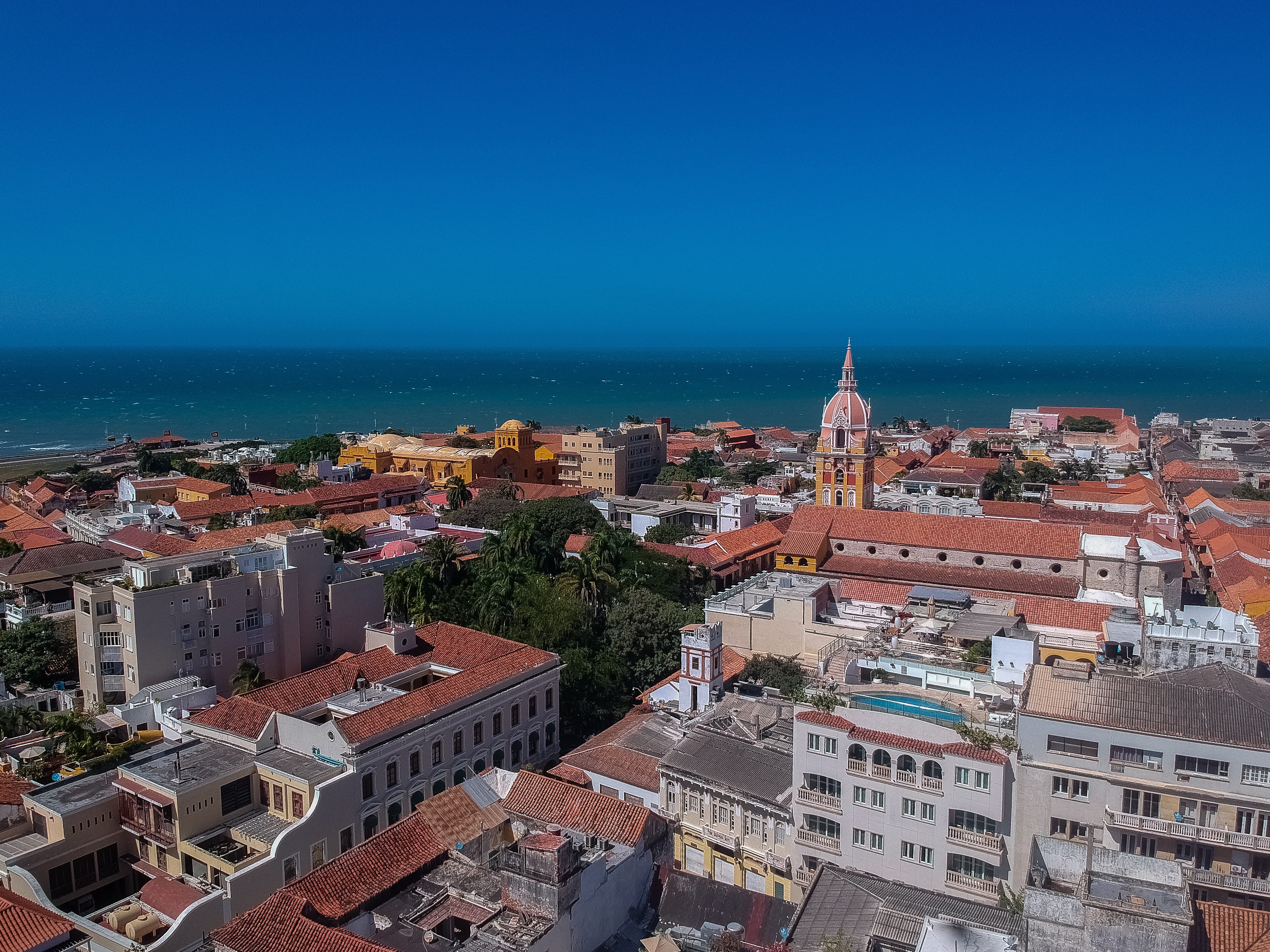
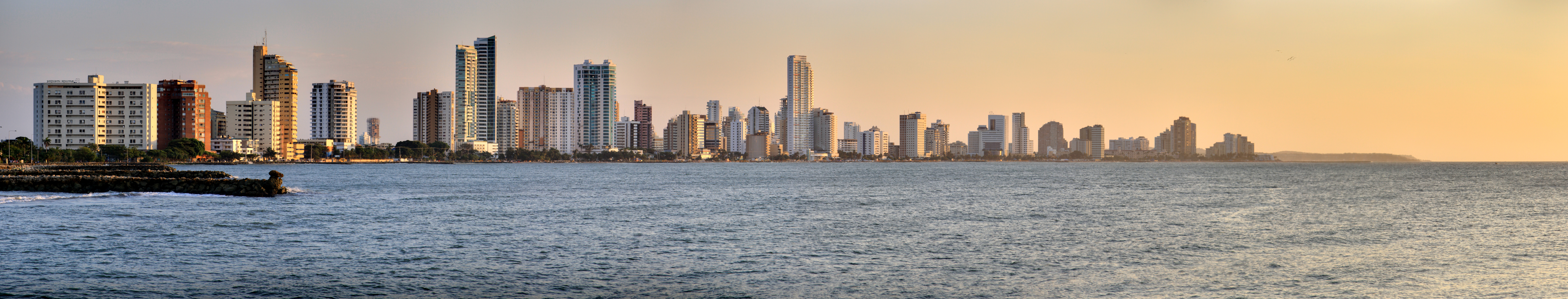
- Castillo San Felipe de Barajas Museo Naval del Caribe Teatro Heredia Torre del Reloj Centro Histórico de Cartagena Bocagrande

- Flag Seal
- Nicknames: La ciudad mágica (The Magic City); La ciudad cosmopolita (The Cosmopolitan City); La heroica (The Heroic); El corralito de piedra (The Rock Corral); La fantástica (The Fantastic)
- Motto: "Por Cartagena"

- Location within Colombia Location within South America
- Coordinates: 10°24′N 75°30′W
- Country: Colombia
- Department: Bolívar
- Region: Caribbean
- Foundation: 1 June 1533
- Founder: Pedro de Heredia
- Named for: Cartagena, Spain

Government
  - Mayor: William Jorge Dau Chamat

Area
  - District and city: 83.2 km^{2} (32.1 sq mi)
  - Metro: 597.7 km^{2} (230.8 sq mi)
- Elevation: 2 m (6.6 ft)

Population (2020)
  - District and city: 914,552
  - Rank: Ranked 5th
  - Density: 11,000/km^{2} (28,500/sq mi)
  - Metro: 1,028,736
  - Metro density: 1,721/km^{2} (4,460/sq mi)
- Demonym: Cartagenero(s) (in Spanish)

GDP (Nominal, 2024)
  - Year: 2023
  - Total: $12.07 billion
  - Per capita: $13,383
- Time zone: UTC-5 (COT)
- Postal code: 130000
- Area code: 57 + 5
- Patron saints: Saint Catherine and Saint Sebastian
- Average temperature: 30 °C (86 °F)
- City tree: Arecaceae
- Website: www.cartagena.gov.co (in Spanish)

UNESCO World Heritage Site
- Official name: Port, Fortresses and Group of Monuments, Cartagena
- Type: Cultural
- Criteria: iv, vi
- Designated: 1984 (8th session)
- Reference no.: 285
- Region: Latin America and Caribbean

Cartagena (/ˌkɑːrtəˈhɛnə/ KAR-tə-HEN-ə), known since the imperial era as Cartagena de Indias (Spanish: [kaɾtaˈxena ðe ˈindjas]), is a city and one of the major ports on the northern coast of Colombia in the Caribbean Coast Region, along the Caribbean Sea. Cartagena's past role as a link in the route to the West Indies provides it with important historical value for world exploration and preservation of heritage from the great commercial maritime routes. As a former Spanish colony, it was a key port for the export of Bolivian silver to Spain and for the import of enslaved Africans under the asiento system. It was defensible against pirate attacks in the Caribbean. The city's strategic location between the Magdalena and Sinú rivers also gave it easy access to the interior of New Granada and made it a main port for trade between Spain and its overseas empire, establishing its importance by the early 1540s.

Modern Cartagena is the capital of the Bolívar Department, and had a population of 876,885 according to the 2018 census, making it the second-largest city in the Caribbean region, after Barranquilla, and the fifth-largest city in Colombia. The metropolitan area of Cartagena is the sixth-largest urban area in the country, after the metropolitan area of Bucaramanga. Economic activities include the maritime and petrochemical industries, as well as tourism.

The present city—named after Cartagena, Spain and by extension, the historic city of Carthage—was founded on 1 June 1533, making it one of South America's oldest colonial cities; but settlement by various indigenous people in the region around Cartagena Bay dates from 4000 BC. During the Spanish colonial period, Cartagena had a key role in the administration and expansion of the Spanish Empire. It was a center of political, ecclesiastical, and economic activity. In 1984, Cartagena's colonial walled city and fortress were designated a UNESCO World Heritage Site.

It was also the site of the Battle of Cartagena de Indias in 1741 during the War of Jenkins' Ear between Spain and Britain.

== History ==
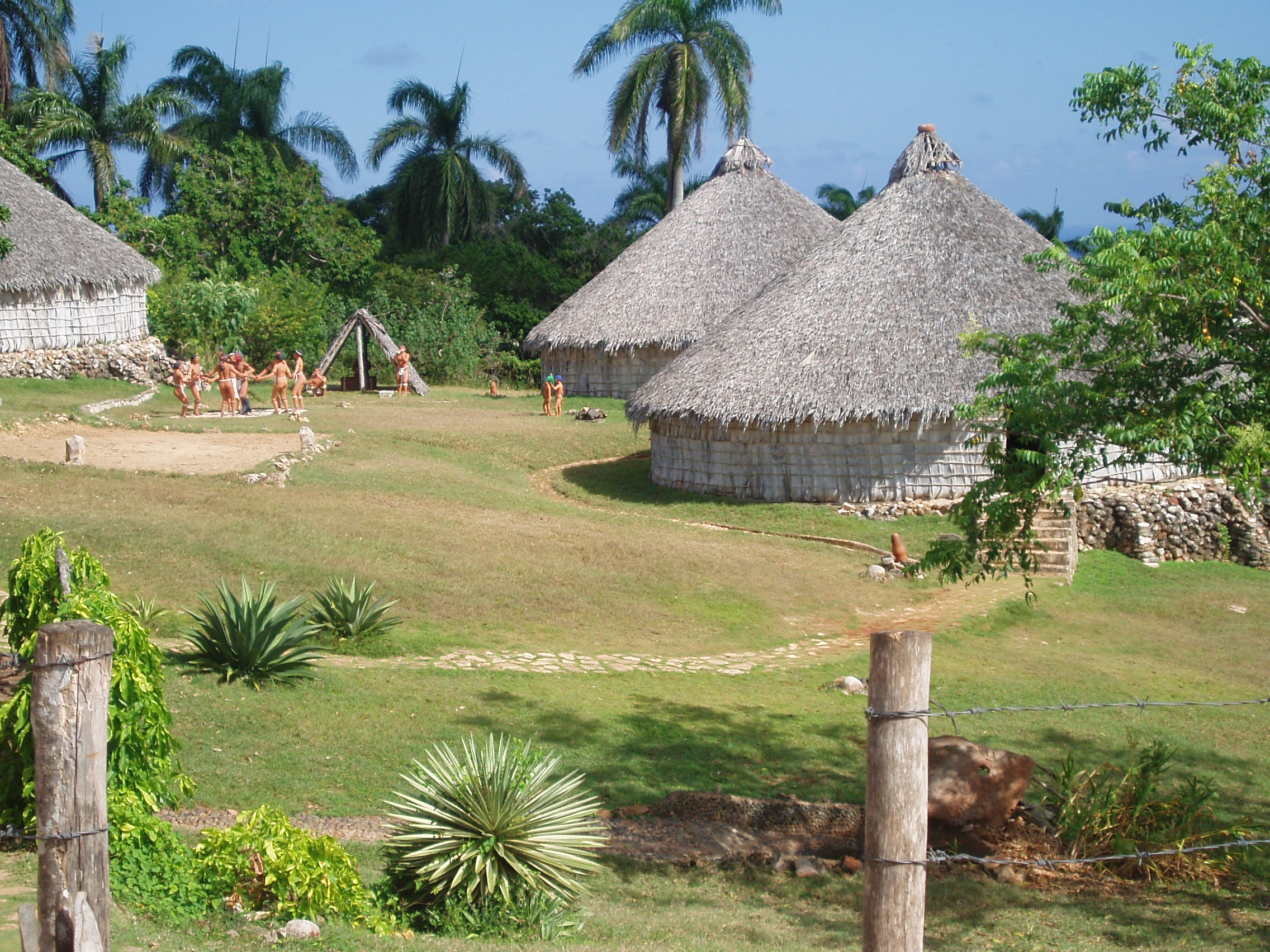
According to descriptions that survive, the homes of the prehistoric inhabitants of the city may have looked very similar to these Taíno culture huts in Baconao

=== Pre-Columbian era: 4000 BC – AD 1500 ===
The Puerto Hormiga Culture, founded in the Arjona Municipality of the Bolívar Department in the Caribbean coast region, particularly in the area from the Sinú River Delta to the Cartagena Bay, appears to be the first documented human community in what is now Colombia. Archeologists estimate that around 4000 BC, the formative culture was located near the boundary between the current departments of Bolívar and Sucre. In this area, archeologists have found the most ancient ceramic objects of the Americas, dating from around 4000 BC. The primary reason for the proliferation of primitive societies in this area is thought to have been the relatively mild climate and the abundance of wildlife, which allowed the hunting inhabitants a comfortable life.

Archaeological investigations date the decline of the Puerto Hormiga culture and its related settlements to ~3000 BC. The rise of a much more developed culture, the Monsú, who lived at the end of the Dique Canal near today's Cartagena neighborhoods Pasacaballos and Ciénaga Honda at the northernmost part of Barú Island, has been hypothesized. The Monsú culture appears to have inherited the Puerto Hormiga culture's use of the art of pottery and also to have developed a mixed economy of agriculture and basic manufacture. The Monsú people's diet was based mostly on shellfish and fresh and salt-water fish.

The development of the Sinú society in what is today the departments of Córdoba and Sucre eclipsed these first developments around the Cartagena Bay area. Until the Spanish colonization, many cultures derived from the Karib, Malibu and Arawak language families lived along the Colombian Caribbean coast. In the late pre-Columbian era, the Sierra Nevada de Santa Marta was home to the Tayrona people, whose language was closely related to the Chibcha language family.

Around AD 1500, the area was inhabited by different tribes of the Carib language family, more precisely the Mocanae sub-family.

Mocana villages of the Carib people around the Bay of Cartagena included:

- on a sandy island facing the ocean in what is present-day downtown: Kalamarí (Calamari)
- on the island of Tierrabomba: Carex
- on Isla Barú, then a peninsula: Bahaire
- on present-day Mamonal, the eastern coast of the exterior bay: Cospique
- in the suburban area of Turbaco: Yurbaco Tribe

Heredia found these settlements "...largely surrounded with the heads of dead men placed on stakes."

Some subsidiary tribes of the Kalamari lived in today's neighborhood of Pie de la Popa, and other subsidiaries from the Cospique lived in the Membrillal and Pasacaballos areas. Among these, according to the earliest documents available, the Kalamari had preeminence. These tribes, though physically and administratively separated, shared a common architecture, such as hut structures consisting of circular rooms with tall roofs, which were surrounded by defensive wooden palisades.

=== First sightings by Europeans: 1500–1533 ===
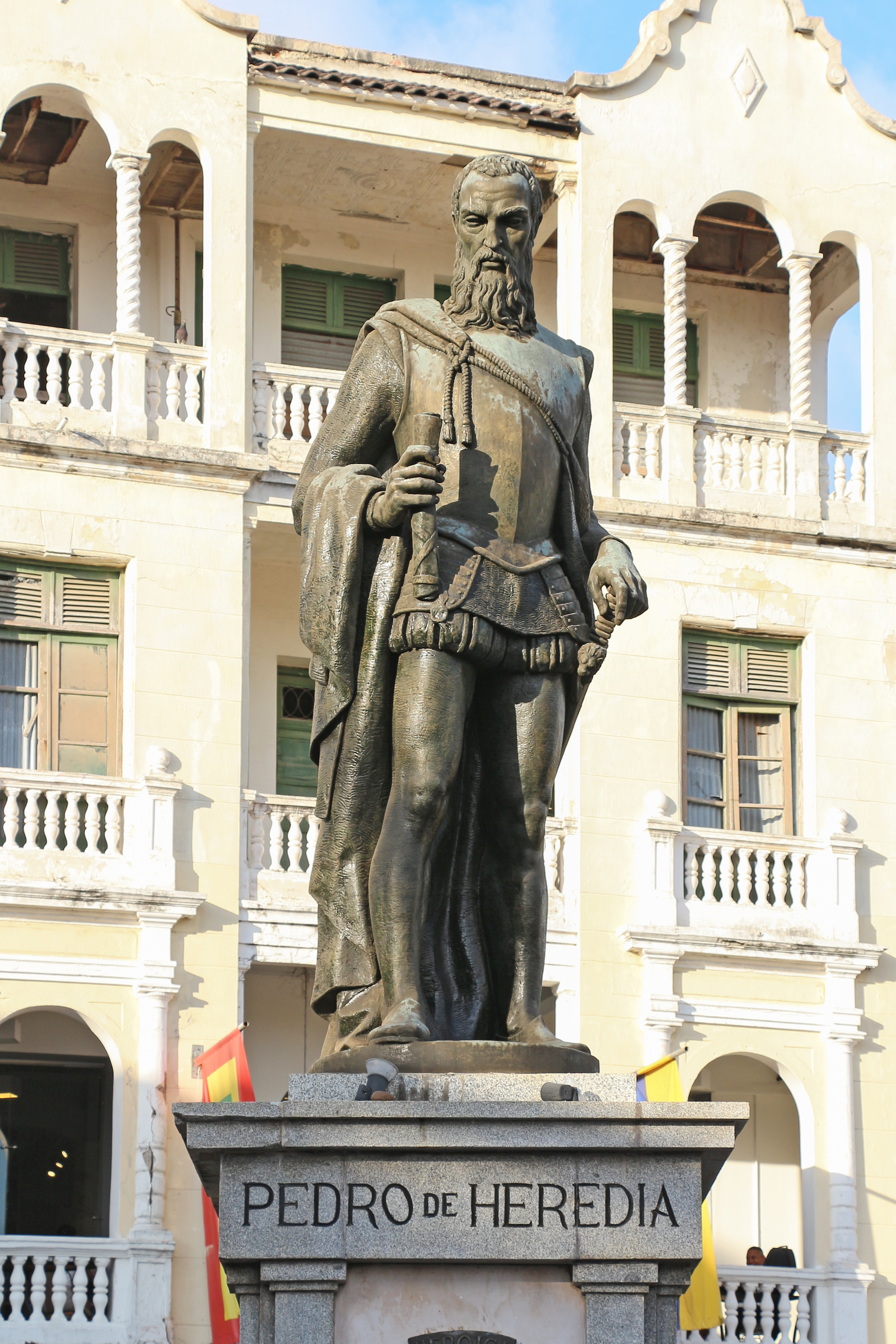
Pedro de Heredia, founder of the city and explorer of its hinterland

Rodrigo de Bastidas traveled to the Pearl Coast and the Gulf of Uraba in 1500–01. On 14 February 1504, Ferdinand V contracted Juan de la Cosa's voyage to Uraba. However, Juan de la Cosa died in 1510 along with 300 of Alonso de Ojeda's men, after an armed confrontation with indigenous people, and before Juan de la Cosa could get possession of the Gulf of Urabá area. Similar contracts were signed in 1508 with Diego de Nicuesa for the settlement of Veragua and with Alonso de Ojeda for the settlement of Urabá, "where gold had already been obtained on earlier voyages," according to Floyd.

After the failed effort to found Antigua del Darién in 1506 by Alonso de Ojeda and the subsequent unsuccessful founding of San Sebastián de Urabá in 1510 by Diego de Nicuesa, the southern Caribbean coast became unattractive to colonizers. They preferred the better known Hispaniola and Cuba.

Although the royal control point for trade, the Casa de Contratación permitted Rodrigo de Bastidas (1460–1527) to again conduct an expedition as adelantado to this area, Bastidas explored the coast and sighted the Magdalena River Delta in his first journey from Guajira to the south in 1527, a trip that ended in the Gulf of Urabá, the location of the failed first settlements. De Nicuesa and De Ojeda noted the existence of a big bay on the way from Santo Domingo to Urabá and the Panama isthmus, which encouraged Bastidas to investigate.

=== Colonial era: 1533–1717 ===
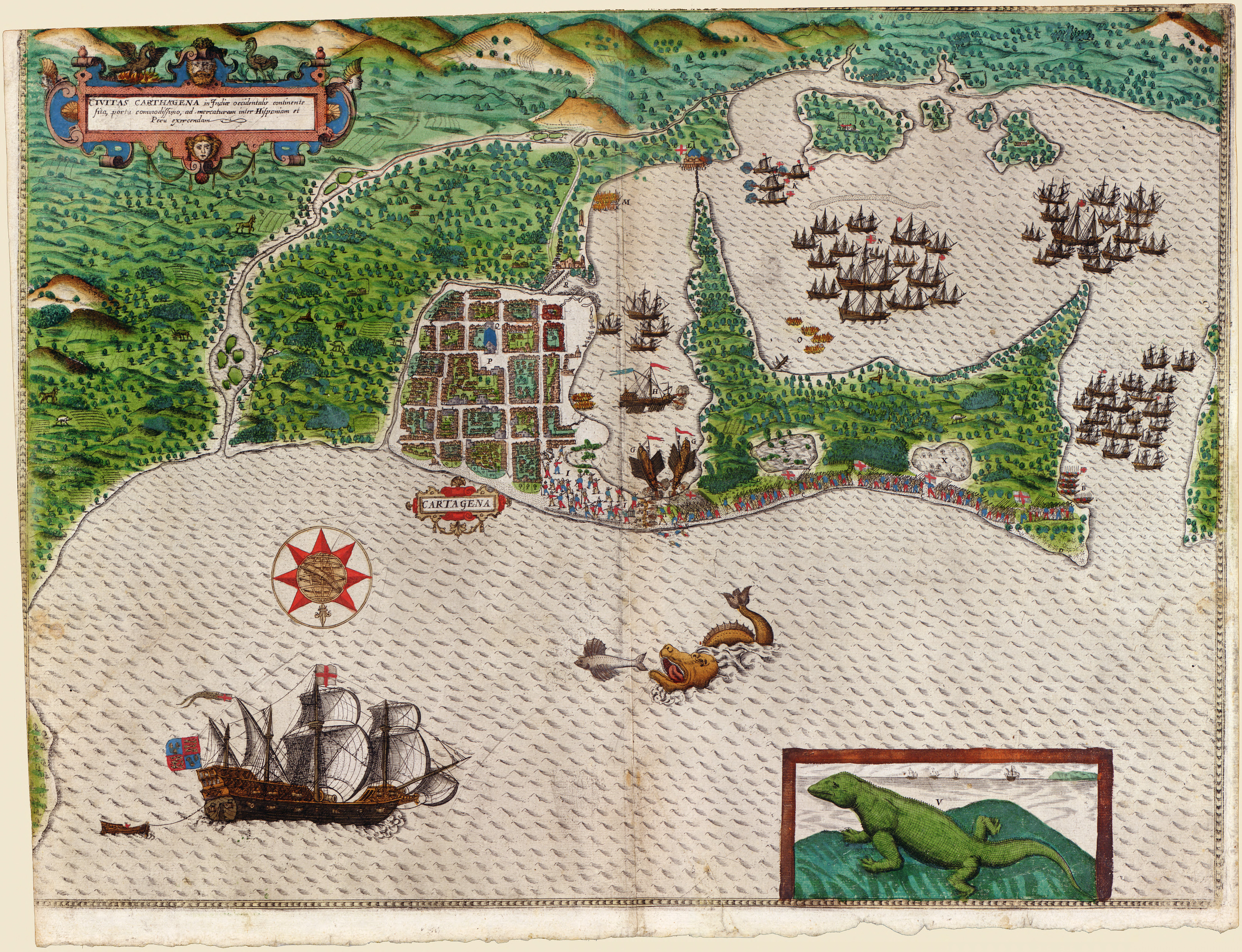
Map of the city recently established and without walls (c.1550)

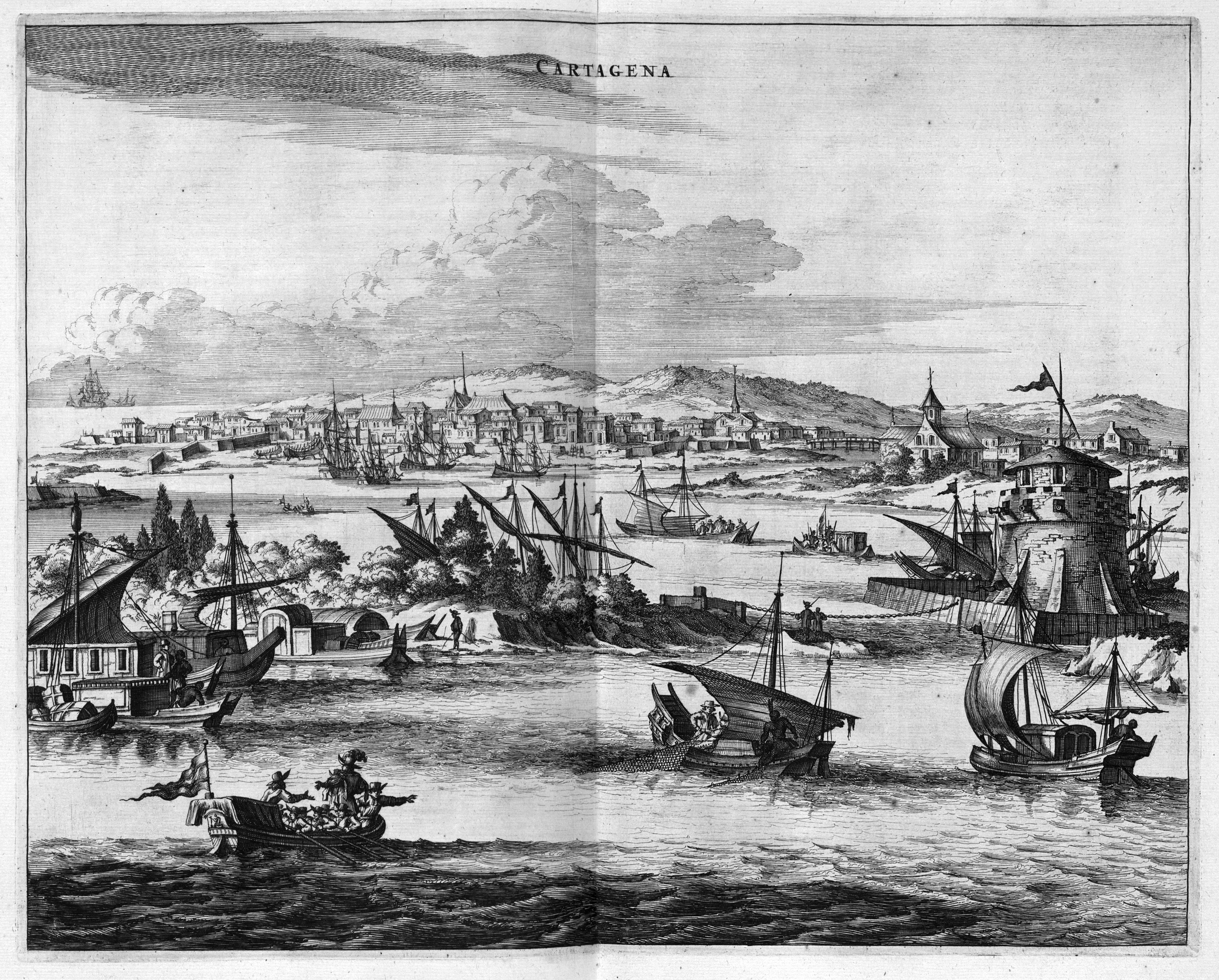
Cartagena de Indias published in 1671 by Arnoldus Montanus

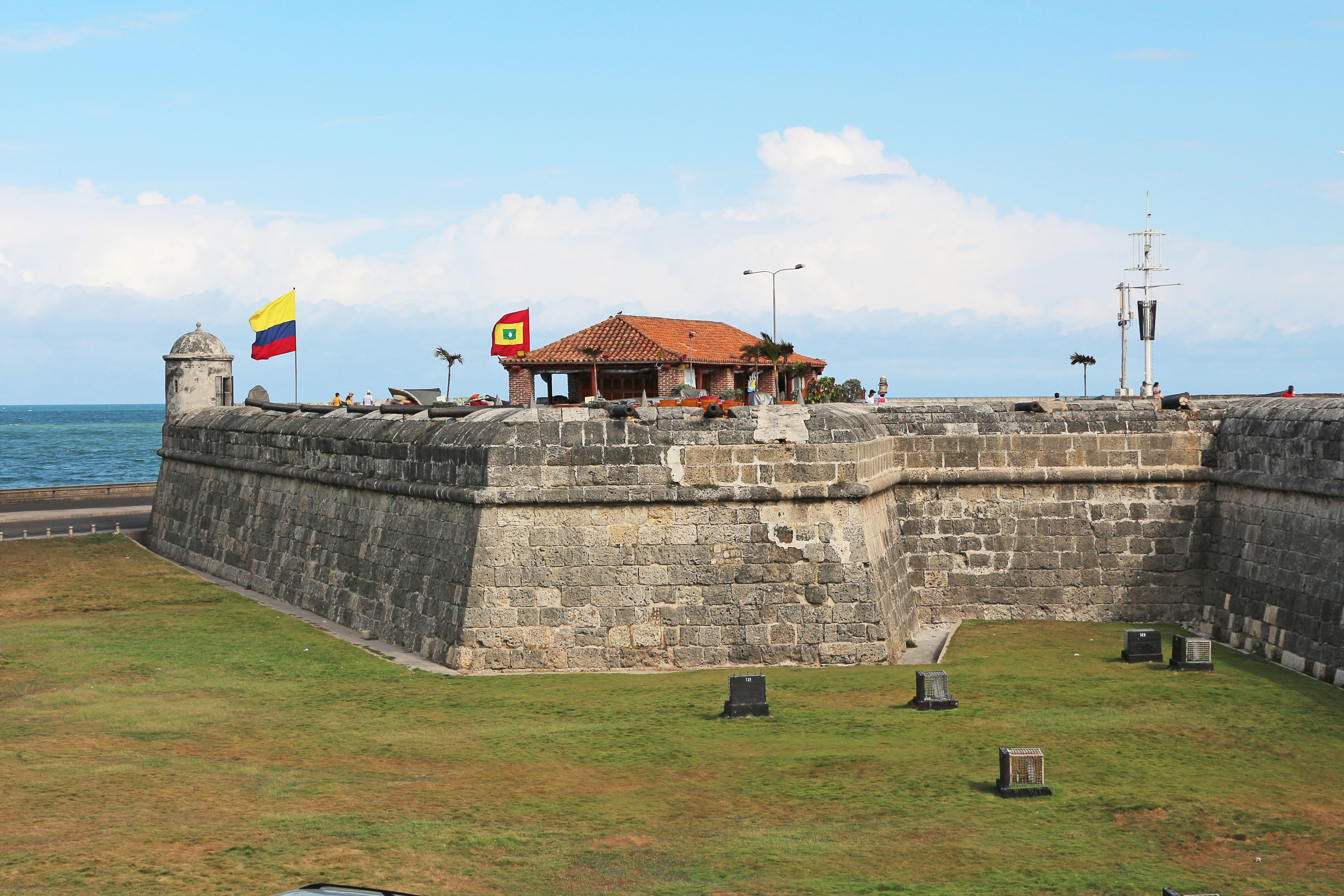
The historic center is surrounded by 11 kilometers of defensive walls. These were complemented by fortifications along the coast, making Cartagena an impregnable city. The walls, made in several stages, were designed to protect the city from continual pirate attacks and were built between 1614 and 1796.

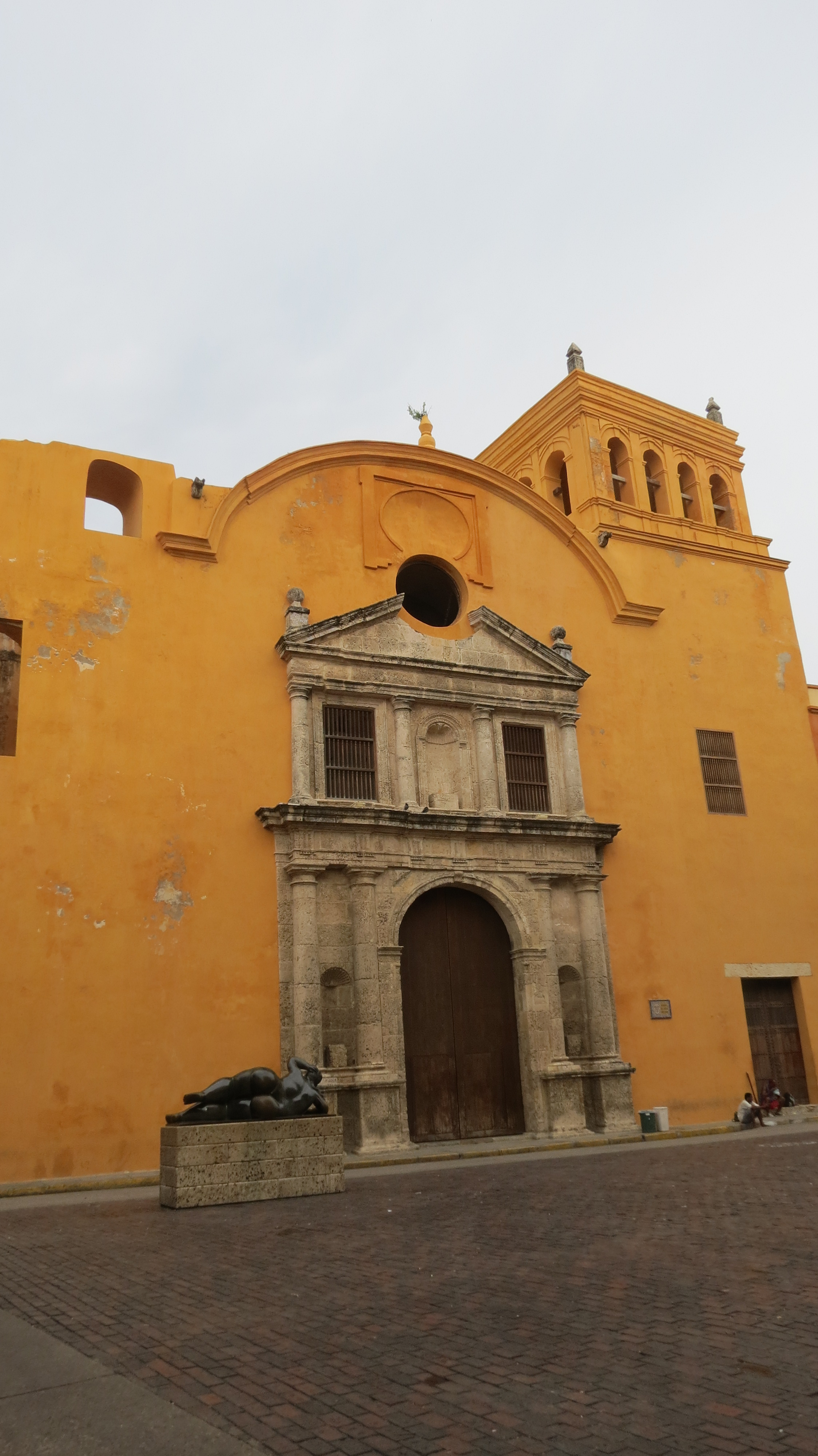
The Convento de Santo Domingo, built between 1565 and 1630, is the oldest church of Cartagena de Indias.

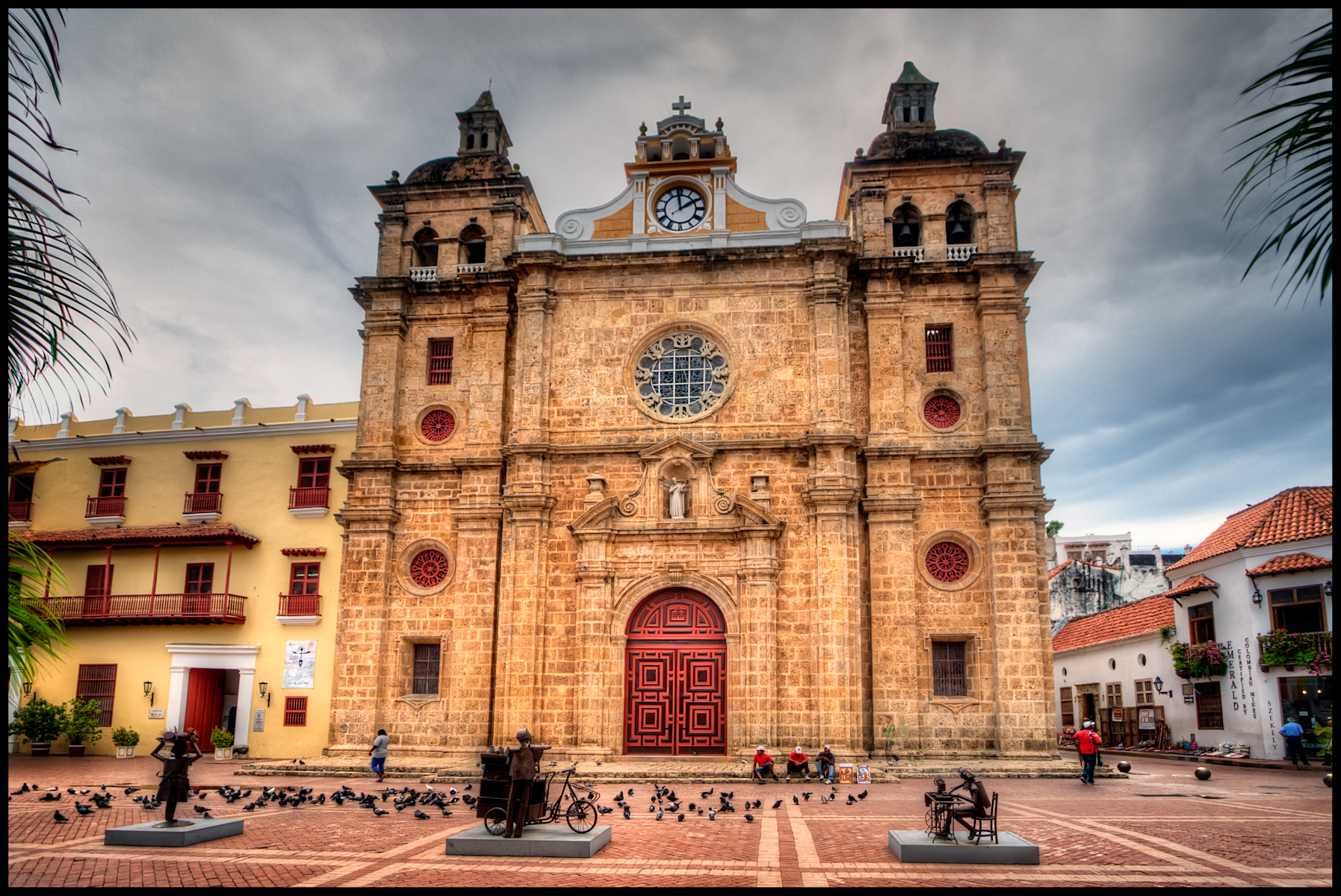
Iglesia de San Pedro Claver built between 1580 and 1654. The body of Saint Peter Claver is located at its main altar.

Under contract to Queen Joanna of Castile, Pedro de Heredia entered the Bay of Cartagena with three ships, a lighter, 150 men, and 22 horses, on 14 January 1533. He soon found the village of Calamari abandoned. Proceeding onwards to Turbaco, where Juan de la Cosa had been mortally wounded 13 years earlier, Heredia fought an all-day battle before claiming victory. Using India Catalina as a guide, Heredia embarked on a three-month exploration expedition. He returned to Calamari in April 1533 with gold pieces, including a solid gold porcupine weighing 132 pounds. In later expeditions, Heredia raided the Sinú tombs and temples of gold. His rule as governor of Cartagena lasted 22 years before he perished on his return to Spain in 1544.

Cartagena was founded on 1 June 1533 by the Spanish commander, Pedro de Heredia, in the former location of the indigenous Caribbean Calamarí village. The town was named after the port city of Cartagena, in Murcia in southeast Spain, where most of Heredia's sailors had resided. King Philip II gave Cartagena the title of "city" (ciudad) in 1574, adding "most noble and loyal" in 1575.

The city's increasing importance as a port for the export of Bolivian silver from Potosí to Spain made it an obvious target for pirates and corsairs, encouraged by France, England, and Holland. In 1544, the city was pillaged by 5 ships and 1,000 men under the command of the French pirate Jean-François Roberval, who took advantage of the city still without walls. Heredia was forced to retreat to Turbaco until a ransom was paid. A defensive tower, San Felipe del Boquerón, was built in 1566 by Governor Anton Davalos. It was supposed to protect the anchorage and the Bahía de las Ánimas, a water lane into Plaza de la Mar (current-day Plaza de la Aduana), but the fort's battery had limited range. Then the French pirate Martin Cote struck in 1569 with 1,000 men, ransacking the city.

A few months after the disaster of the invasion of Côte, a fire destroyed the city and forced the creation of a firefighting squad, the first in the Americas.

In 1568, Sir John Hawkins tried to persuade Governor Martín de las Alas to open a trade fair in the city, which would allow his men to sell foreign goods. This was a violation of Spanish law, which forbade trade with foreigners. Many in the settlement suspected this would have allowed Hawkins to sack the port afterward; as such, the governor declined. Hawkins bombarded the city for 8 days, but failed to make any significant impact and withdrew. Then Francis Drake attacked in April 1586 with 23 ships and 3,000 men. Drake burned 200 houses and the cathedral, departing only after a ransom was paid a month later.

Spain then commissioned Bautista Antonelli in 1586 to design a master scheme for defending its Caribbean ports. This included a second visit to Cartagena in 1594, when he drew up plans for a walled city.

In 1610, the Holy Office of the Inquisition was established in Cartagena, and the Palace of Inquisition was completed in 1770. Sentences were pronounced in the main city plaza, today's Plaza de Bolívar, during the Autos de Fe ceremonies. Crimes under its jurisdiction included those of heresy, blasphemy, bigamy and witchcraft. A total of 767 people were punished, with punishments ranging from fines and wearing a Sanbenito to life imprisonment or even the death penalty. The Inquisition was abolished with independence in 1811.

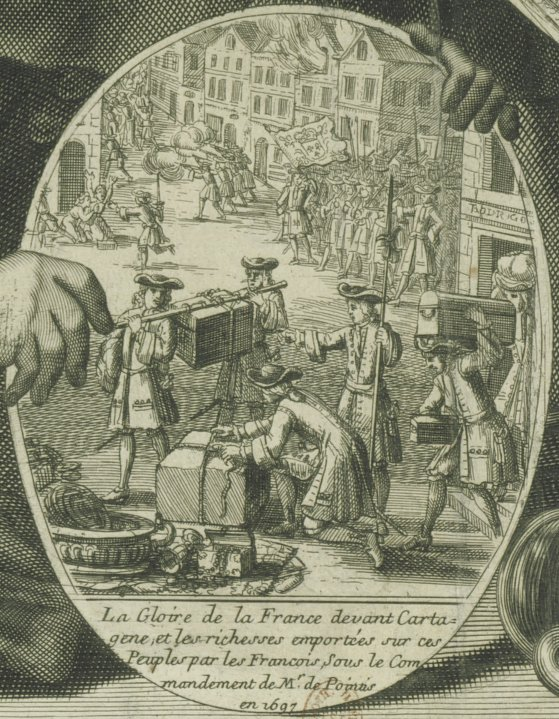
An illustration of the Raid on Cartagena in 1697 by French privateers. The raid was led by Bernard Desjean, Baron de Pointis, who made off with roughly 2,000,000 livres in loot. The burning settlement is seen in the background (1698, Pierre Landry).

The first enslaved people were brought by Pedro de Heredia to work as "macheteros", clearing the underbrush. By the 17th century, Cartagena had become an important slave market in the New World, centered around the Plaza de los Coches. European slave traders began to bring enslaved peoples from Africa during this period. Spain was the only European power that did not establish factories in Africa to purchase enslaved people. Therefore, the Spanish Empire relied on the asiento system, awarding merchants from other European nations the license to trade enslaved people to their overseas territories.

Gov. Francisco de Murga made the Inner Bay an "impregnable lagoon", according to Segovia, which included the forts El Boquerón, Castillo Grande, Manzanillo, and Manga. Besides the walls built to defend the historic district of Calamari, Francisco de Murga enclosed Getsemani with protective walls starting in 1631. This included the battery of Media Luna of San Antonio, located between the bastions of Santa Teresa and Santa Bárbara, which protected the only gate and causeway to the mainland.

The practice of Situado is exemplified in the magnitude of the city's subsidy between 1751 and 1810, when the city received the sum of 20,912,677 Spanish reales.

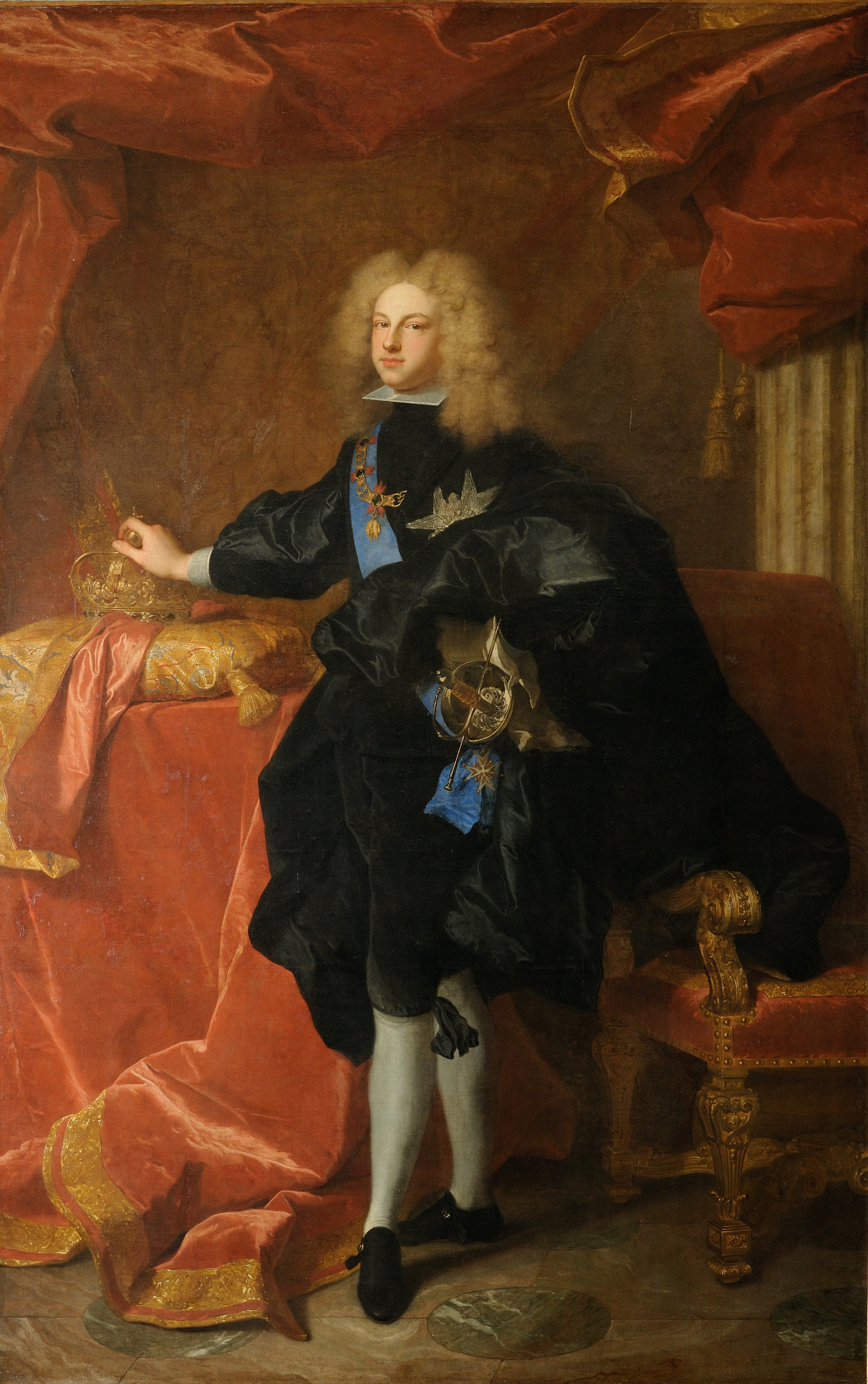
The policies of the Bourbon Dynasty in Spain, such as those of Philip V, stimulated the economic growth and consolidation of the Spanish America.

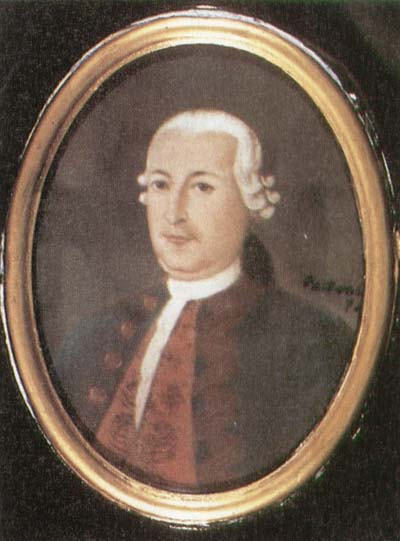
Juan Díaz de Torrezar Pimienta, as governor, was the mastermind of the reconstruction of the city after the destruction of 1697.

The Raid on Cartagena, in April 1697 during the Nine Years' War, by Sir Bernard Desjean, Baron de Pointis and Jean Baptiste Ducasse was a severe blow to Cartagena. The Baron's forces included 22 large ships, 500 cannon, and 4,000 troops, while Ducasse's forces consisted of 7 ships and 1,200 buccaneers. They quickly overwhelmed Sancho Jimeno de Orozco's force of 30 men in the San Luis de Bocachica fortification. Then, San Felipe de Barajas also fell, and the city came under bombardment. When the Half Moon Gate was breached and Getsemani Island occupied, Governor Diego de los Ríos capitulated. The Baron left after a month of plunder (roughly 2 million livres), and Ducasse followed a week later.

When King Philip II employed the Italian engineer Juan Bautista Antonelli to design a master plan of fortifications for Cartagena, construction would actually continue for the next two hundred years. On 17 March 1640, three Portuguese ships under the command of Rodrigo Lobo da Silva ran aground in the Bocagrande Channel. This accelerated the formation of a sand bar, which soon connected the Bocagrande Peninsula to the island of Tierrabomba. The defense of the bay then shifted to two forts on either side of Bocachica, San José and San Luis de Bocachica. San Luis was replaced by San Fernando after the 1741 English raid. The next narrow passage was formed by the Island of Manzanillo, where San Juan del Manzanillo was constructed, and Santa Cruz O Castillo Grande opposite on Cruz Grande at Punta Judio, both connected by a floating chain. Finally, there was San Felipe del Boquerón, later San Sebastián del Pastelillo. The city itself was circled with a ring of bastions connected by curtains. The island of Getsemani was also fortified. Protecting the city on the landward side, atop San Lázaro hill, was the Castillo San Felipe de Barajas named in honor of Spain's King Philip IV and Governor Pedro Zapata de Mendoza, Marquis of Barajas' father, the Count of Barajas. Completed in 1654, the fort was expanded in the 18th century, and included underground corridors and galleries.

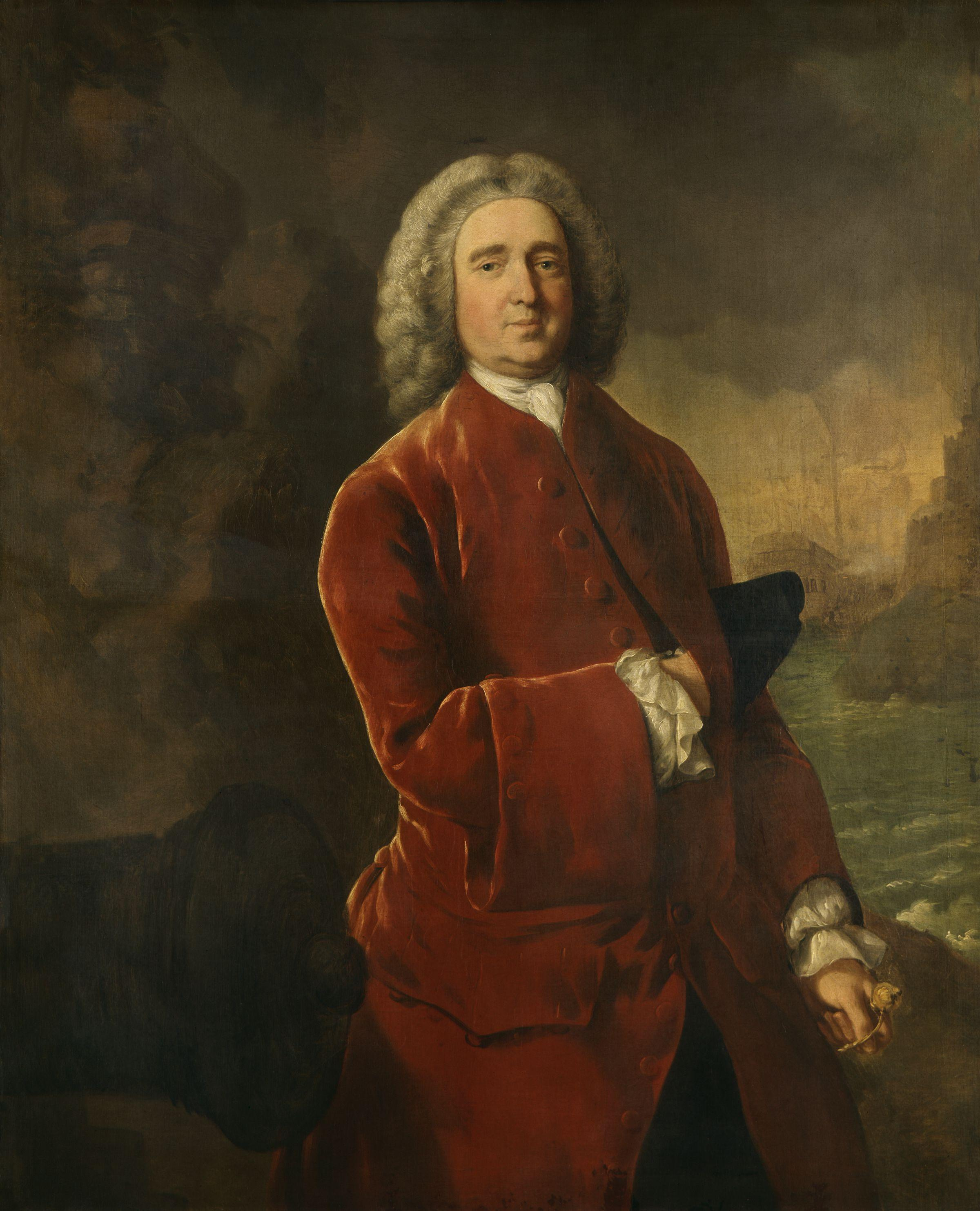
The final serious attempt to take the city and invade New Granada was made by Edward Vernon, who failed in one of the biggest military expeditions ever sent there.

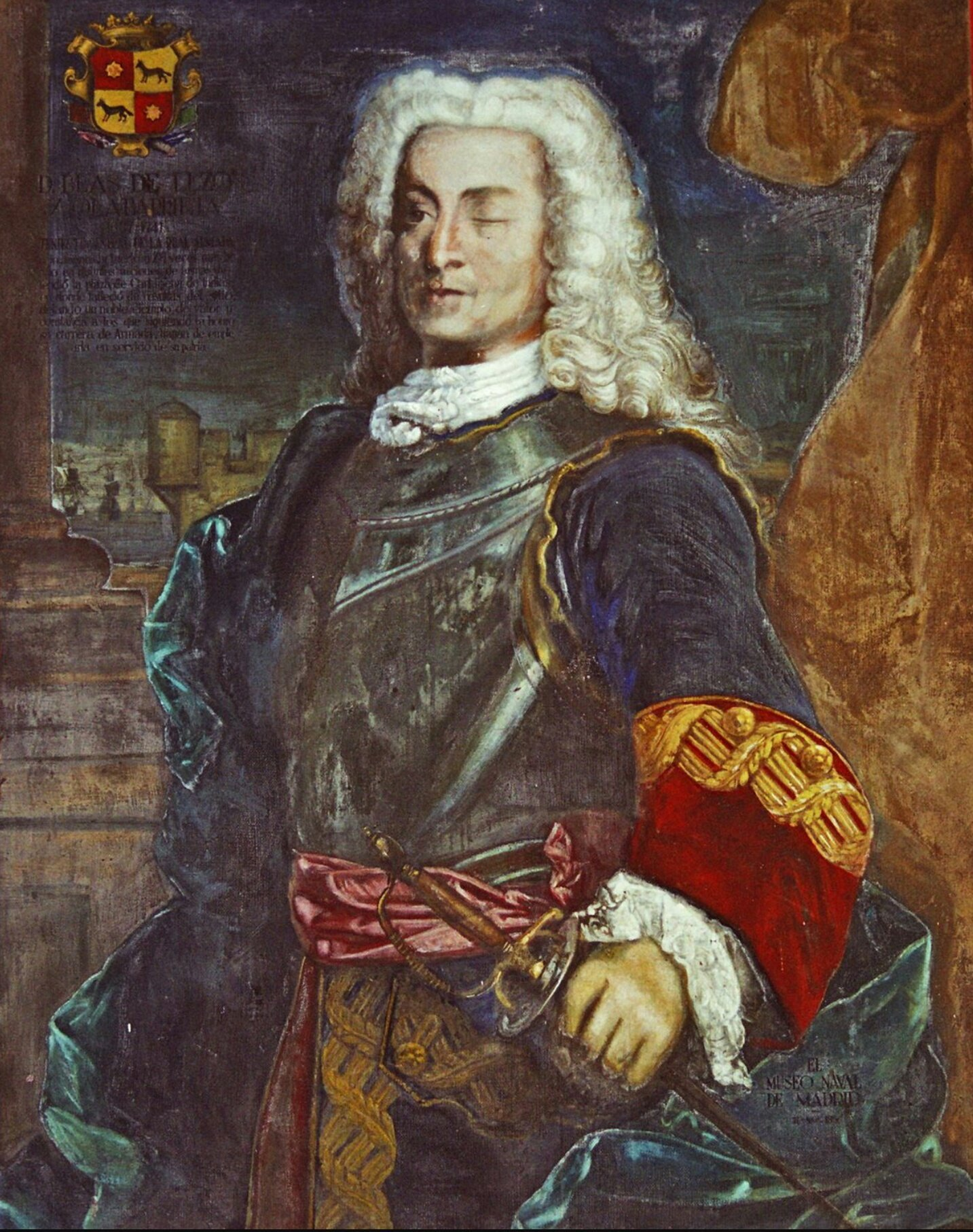
Blas de Lezo, the one-eyed, one-legged, one-handed Spanish mariner, was one of those who defended the city in 1741.

=== Viceregal era: 1717–1811 ===
The 18th century began poorly for the city economically, as the Bourbon dynasty discontinued the Carrera de Indias convoys. However, with the establishment of the Viceroyalty of New Granada and the constant Anglo-Spanish conflicts, Cartagena took on the role of the "gateway to the Indies of Peru". By 1777, the city included 13,700 inhabitants with a garrison of 1300. The population reached 17,600 in 1809.

In 1731, Juan de Herrera y Sotomayor founded the Military Academy of Mathematics and Practice of Fortifications in Cartagena. He is also known for designing the Puerta del Reloj starting in 1704.

==== 1741 attack ====
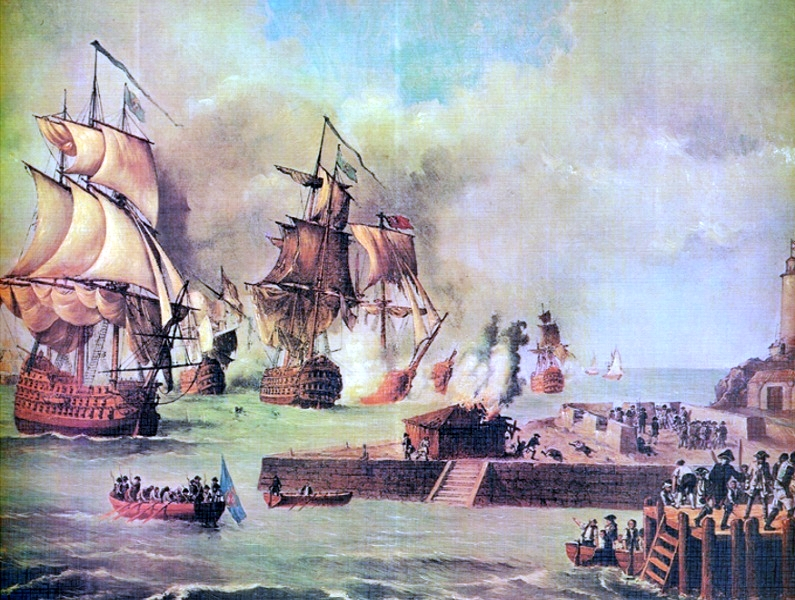
Siege of Cartagena de Indias of 1741, where Spanish Empire forces of 2,800 men, commanded by Blas de Lezo, defeated the British fleet and armies of 23,600 soldiers under Admiral Edward Vernon. The failed siege was decisive for the victory of the War of Jenkins' Ear, and allowed the Spanish Crown to maintain economic dominance in the Caribbean until the Seven Years' War.

Starting in mid-April 1741, the city endured a siege by a large British armada under the command of Admiral Edward Vernon. The engagement, known as the Battle of Cartagena de Indias, was part of the larger War of Jenkins' Ear. The British armada included 50 warships, 130 transport ships, and 25,600 men, including 2,000 North American colonial infantry. The Spanish defense was under the command of Sebastián de Eslava and Don Blas de Lezo. The British were able to take the Castillo de San Luis at Bocachica and land marines on the island of Tierrabomba and Manzanillo. The North Americans then took La Popa hill.

Following a failed attack on San Felipe Barajas on 20 April 1741, which left 800 British dead and another 1,000 taken prisoner, Vernon lifted the siege. By that time, he had many sick men from tropical diseases. An interesting footnote to the battle was the inclusion of George Washington's half-brother, Lawrence Washington, among the North American colonial troops. Lawrence later named his Mount Vernon estate in honor of his commander.

During this era, José Ignacio de Pombo thrived as merchant.

==== Silver Age (1750–1808) ====
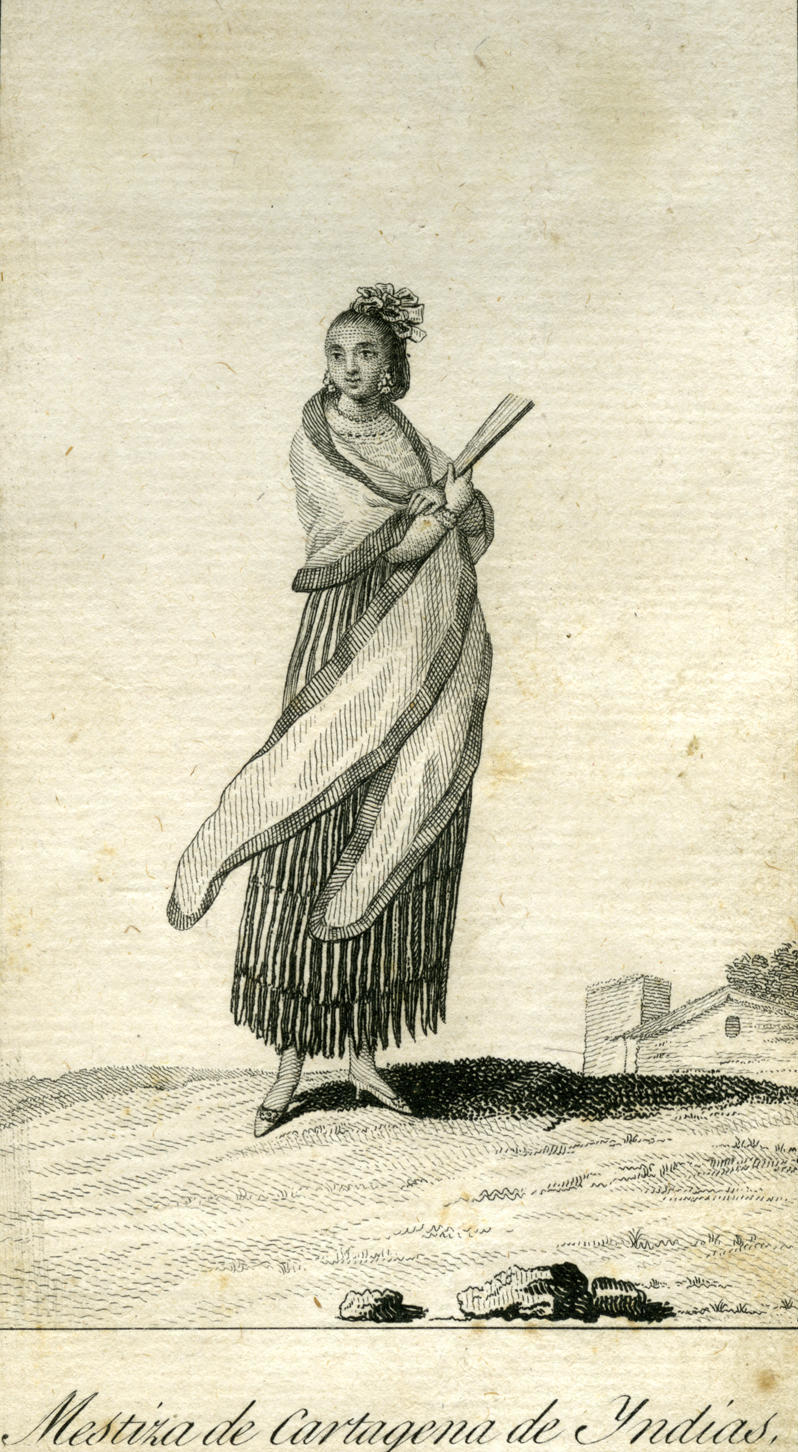
Mestiza of Cartagena de Indias by Antonio Rodríguez Onofre, circa 1799

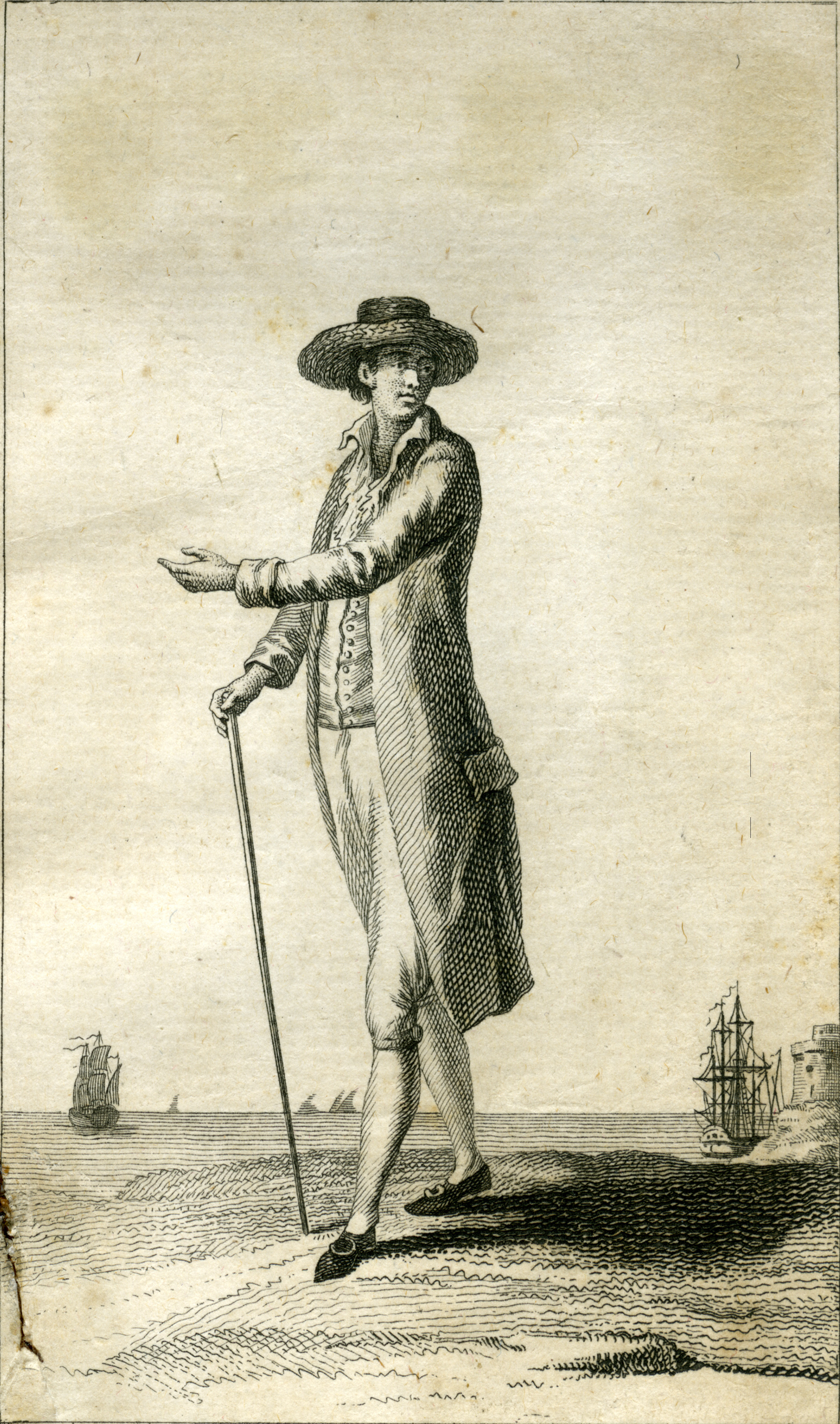
Criollo of Cartagena de Indias by Antonio Rodríguez Onofre, circa 1796

In 1762, Antonio de Arebalo published his Defense Plan, the Report on the state of defense on the avenues of Cartagena de Indias. This engineer continued the work to make Cartagena impregnable, including the construction from 1771 to 1778 of a 3400 yards long underwater jetty across the Bocagrande called the Escollera. Arebalo had earlier completed San Fernando, and the fort-battery of San Jose in 1759, then added El Angel San Rafael on El Horno hill as added protection across the Bocachica.

Among the censuses of the 18th century was the special census of 1778, imposed by the governor of the time, D. Juan de Torrezar Diaz Pimienta – later Viceroy of New Granada – by order of the Marquis of Ensenada, Minister of Finance – so that he would be provided with numbers for his Catastro tax project, which imposed a universal property tax he believed would contribute to the economy while at the same time increasing royal revenues dramatically. The census of 1778, besides having significance for economic history, required each house to be described in detail and its occupants enumerated, making the census an important tool. The census revealed what Ensenada had hoped. However, his enemies in the court convinced King Charles III to oppose the tax plan.

=== 1811 to the 21st century ===
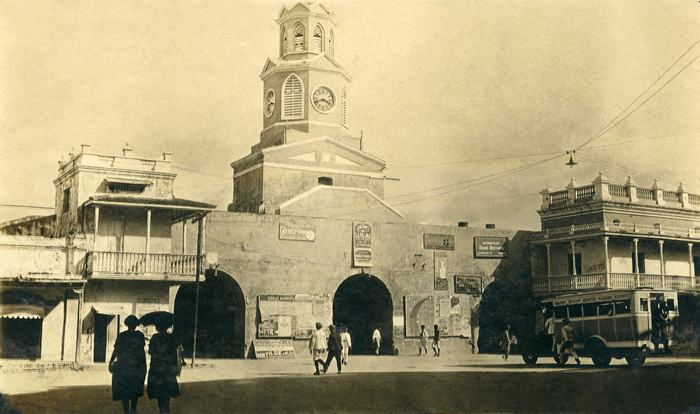
Puerta del Reloj in 1917.

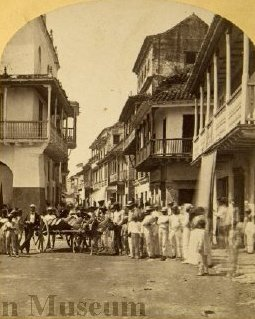
Baroque colonial houses in a street of Cartagena, photo taken in 1871

For more than 275 years, Cartagena was under Spanish rule. With Napoleon's imprisonment of Charles IV and Ferdinand VII, and the start of the Peninsular War, the Latin American wars of independence soon followed. In Cartagena, on 4 June 1810, Royal Commissioner Antonio Villavicencio and the Cartagena City Council banished the Spanish Governor Francisco de Montes on suspicions of sympathy for the French emperor and the French occupation forces that overthrew the king. A Supreme Junta was formed, along with two political parties: one led by Jose Maria Garcia de Toledo representing the aristocrats, and a second led by Gabriel and German Piñeres representing the common people of Getsemani. Finally, on 11 November, a Declaration of Independence was signed proclaiming "a free state, sovereign and independent of all domination and servitude to any power on Earth". The support for a declaration of independence by working-class leader and artisan Pedro Romero was key in pushing the Junta to adopt it.

Spain's reaction was to send a "pacifying expedition" under the command of Pablo Morillo, the Pacifier, and Pascual de Enrile, which included 59 ships and 10,612 men. The city was placed under siege on 22 August 1815. The city was defended by 3000 men, 360 cannons, and 8 ships plus ancillary small watercraft, under the command of Manuel del Castillo y Rada and Juan N. Enslava. However, by that time, the city was under the rule of the García de Toledo Party, having exiled Germán and Gabriel Piñeres, and Simón Bolívar. By 5 December, about 300 people per day died from hunger or disease, forcing 2000 to flee on vessels provided by the French mercenary Louis Aury. By that time, 6000 had died. Morillo, in retaliation after entering the city, shot nine of the rebel leaders on 24 February 1816, at what is now known as the Camellón de los Mártires. These included José María García de Toledo and Manuel del Castillo y Rada.

Finally, a patriot army led by General Mariano Montilla, supported by Admiral José Prudencio Padilla, laid siege to the city from August 1820 until October 1821. A key engagement was the destruction of almost all of the royalist ships anchored on Getsemani Island on 24 June 1821. After Governor Gabriel de Torres surrendered, Simon Bolivar the Liberator bestowed the title "Heroic City" upon Cartagena. The Liberator spent 18 days in the city from 20 to 28 July 1827, staying in the Government Palace in Proclamation Square and as a guest at a banquet hosted by Jose Padilla at his residence on Calle Larga.

Unfortunately, the toll of war, in particular from Morillo's siege, long affected the city. With the loss of the funds it had received as the main colonial military outpost, and the loss of population, the city deteriorated. It suffered a long decline in the aftermath of independence, and was largely neglected by the central government in Bogotá. In fact, its population did not reach pre-1811 numbers until the start of the 20th century.

These declines were also due to disease, including a devastating cholera epidemic in 1849. The Canal del Dique that connected it to the Magdalena River also filled with silt, leading to a drastic reduction in the amount of international trade. The rise of the port of Barranquilla only compounded the decline in trade. During the presidency of Rafael Nuñez, who was a Cartagena native, the central government finally invested in a railroad and other infrastructure improvements and modernization that helped the city to recover.

Cartagena is the capital of the Bolívar department.

== Geography ==
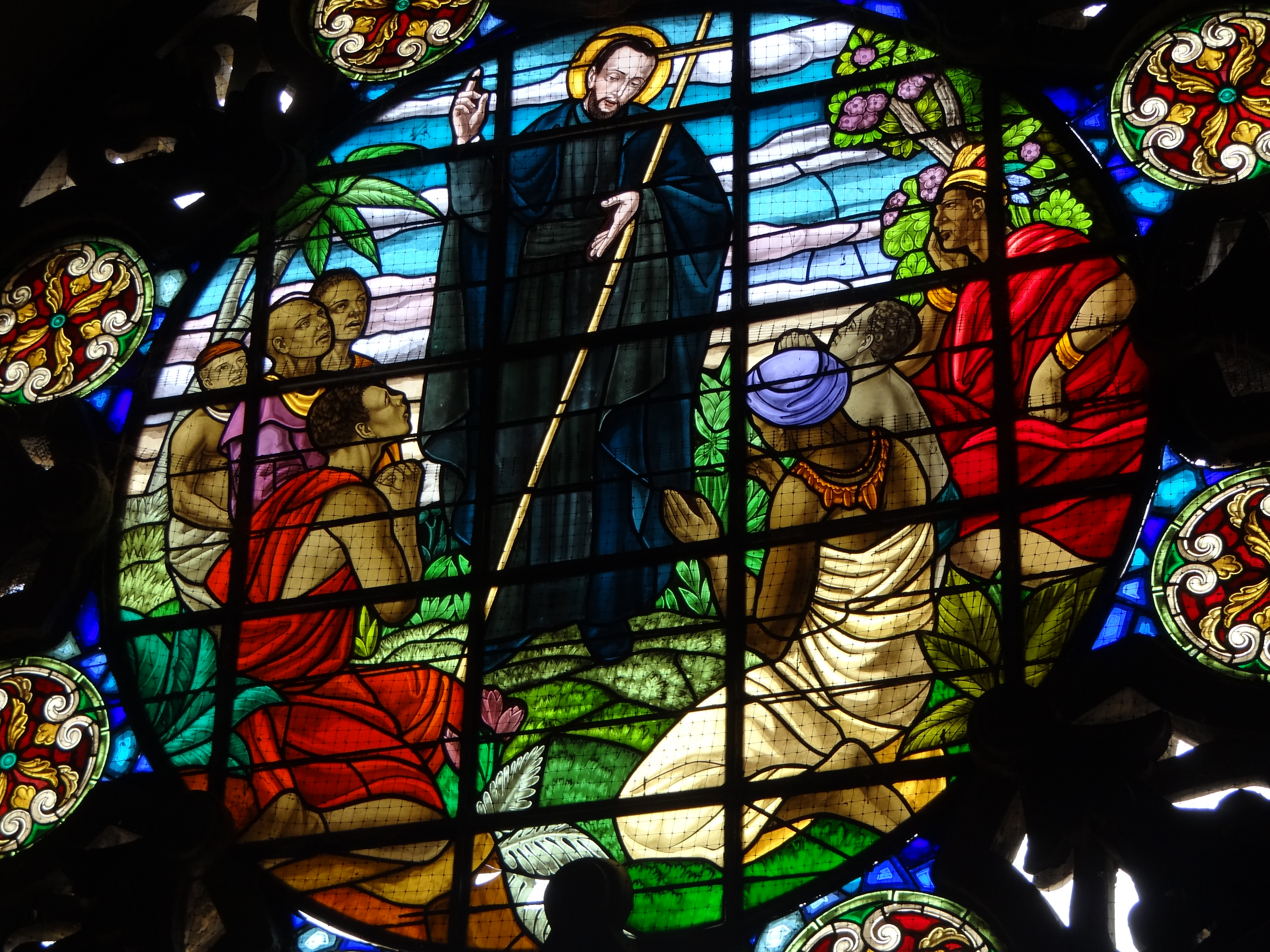
Sanctuary of Saint Peter Claver. Peter Claver was a Spanish-born Jesuit priest who dedicated his life to helping the enslaved Africans, giving them a sense of their own personal dignity. He became the patron saint of enslaved people, seafarers, the Republic of Colombia, and the ministry to Africans.

=== Location ===
Cartagena is located to the north of Colombia, at 10°25'N 75°32'W. It faces the Caribbean Sea to the west. To the south is the Cartagena Bay, which has two entrances: Bocachica (Small Mouth) in the south, and Bocagrande (Big Mouth) in the north. Its coastal line is characterized morphologically by dissipative beaches.

Cartagena bay is an estuary with an area of approximately 84 km^{2}.

=== Neighborhoods ===
==== Northern area ====
In this area is the Rafael Núñez International Airport, located in the neighborhood of Crespo, ten minutes' drive from downtown or the old part of the city and fifteen minutes away from the modern area. Zona Norte, the area located immediately north of the airport, contains hotels, the urban development office of Barcelona de Indias, and several educational institutions. The old city walls, which enclose the centro or downtown area and the neighborhood of San Diego, are located to the southwest of Crespo. On the Caribbean shore between Crespo and the old city lie the neighborhoods of Marbella and El Cabrero.

==== Downtown ====
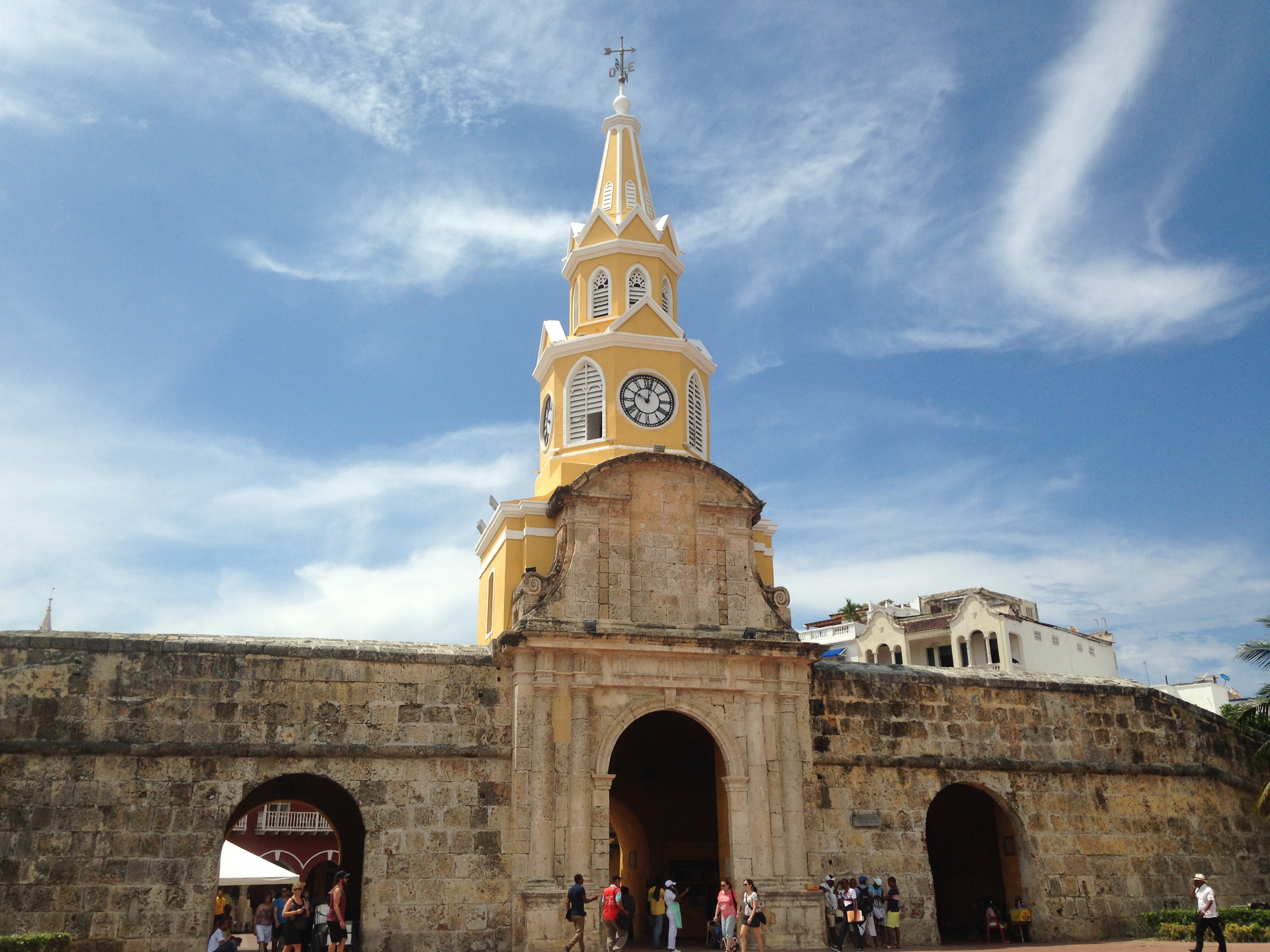
Baroque Puerta del Reloj, built between 1704 and 1738, was the main city gate. This gate is one of the most successful works of the Hispanic American School of Fortification.

The Downtown area of Cartagena has varied architecture, mainly a colonial style, but republican and Italian style buildings, such as the cathedral's bell tower, can be seen.

The main entrance to downtown is the Puerta del Reloj (Clock Gate), which exits onto the Plaza de los Coches (Square of the Carriages). A few steps farther is the Plaza de la Aduana (Customs Square), next to the mayor's office. Nearby is San Pedro Claver Square. The church is also named for Saint Peter Claver, where the body of the Jesuit saint ('Saint of the African slaves') is kept in a casket, as well as the Museum of Modern Art. (Note: Peter Claver was a Spanish-born man who traveled to Cartagena in 1610. On 19 March 1616, he was ordained as a Jesuit priest. Peter cared for the enslaved Africans for thirty-eight years, defending the life and the dignity of the enslaved people. After four years of sickness, Peter died in 1654. Two services were held for him: the official funeral and a separate memorial attended by his African friends. In 1888, the Roman Catholic Church canonized Peter. He is now known as the patron saint of African Americans, enslaved people, and the Republic of Colombia.)

Nearby is the Plaza de Bolívar (Bolívar's Square) and the Palace of Inquisition. Plaza de Bolívar (formerly known as Plaza de la Inquisición) is essentially a small park with a statue of Simón Bolívar in the center. This plaza is surrounded by balconied colonial buildings. Shaded outdoor cafes line the street.

The Office of Historical Archives devoted to Cartagena's history is not far away. Next to the archives is the Government Palace, the office building of the Governor of the Department of Bolívar. Across from the palace is the Cathedral of Cartagena, which dates back to the 16th century.

Another religious building of significance is the Iglesia de Santo Domingo in front of Plaza Santo Domingo (Santo Domingo Square). In the square is the sculpture Mujer Reclinada ("Reclining Woman"), a gift from the notable Colombian artist Fernando Botero. Nearby is the Tcherassi Hotel, a 250-year-old colonial mansion renovated by designer Silvia Tcherassi.

In the city are the Augustinian Fathers Convent and the University of Cartagena. This university is a center of higher education opened to the public in the late 19th century. The Claustro de Santa Teresa (Saint Theresa Cloister) has been remodeled and has become a hotel operated by Charleston Hotels. It has its own square, protected by the San Francisco Bastion.

A 20-minute walk from downtown is the Castillo de San Felipe de Barajas, located in El Pie de la Popa (another neighborhood), one of the greatest fortresses built by the Spaniards in their colonies. The tunnels were all constructed in such a way as to make it possible to hear the footsteps of an approaching enemy. Some of the tunnels are open for viewing today.

Cartagena's walled Old City is known in part for its lush plazas, and sherbet-hued Spanish colonial buildings.

==== San Diego ====
San Diego was named after the local San Diego Convent, now known as the Beaux Arts University Building. In front of it is the Convent of the Nuns of the Order of Saint Clare, now the Hotel Santa Clara. In the surrounding area is Santo Toribio Church, the last church built in the Walled City. Next to it is Fernández de Madrid Square, honoring Cartagena's hero, José Fernández de Madrid, whose statue can be seen nearby.

Inside the Old City is found in Las Bóvedas (The Vaults), a construction attached to the walls of the Santa Catalina Fortress. From the top of this construction, the Caribbean Sea is visible.

==== Getsemaní ====
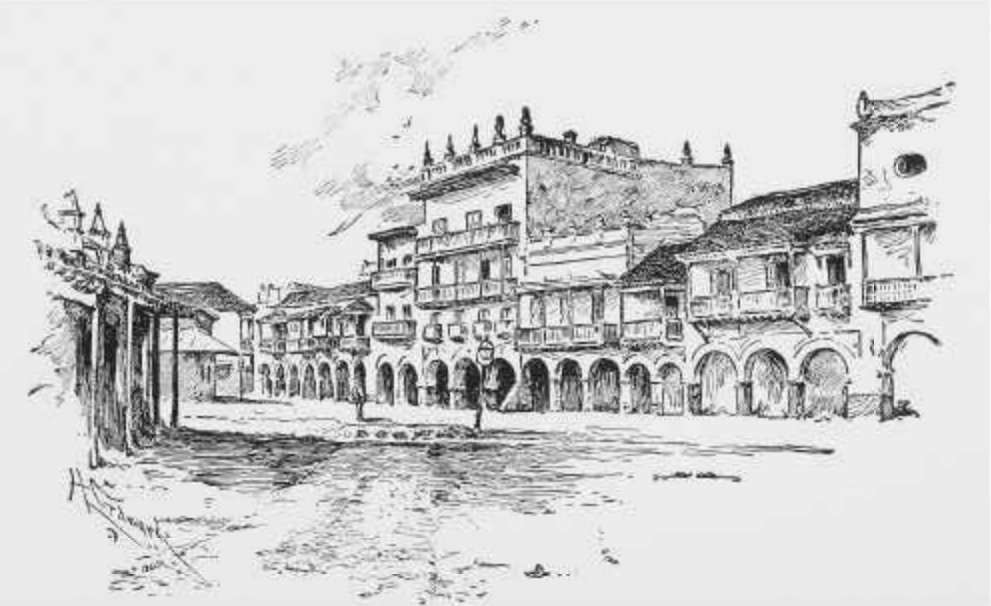
Painting of 1893 of Plaza de los Coches.

Once a district characterized by crime, Getsemaní, just south of the ancient walled fortress, has become "Cartagena's hippest neighborhood and one of Latin America's newest hotspots", with plazas that were once the scene of drug dealing being reclaimed and old buildings being turned into boutique hotels.

Getsemaní has become a "Ciudad Mural" to rescue the values, customs, traditions, and anecdotes of the people.

==== Bocagrande ====
The Bocagrande (Big Mouth) is an area known for its skyscrapers. The area contains the bulk of the city's tourist facilities, such as hotels, shops, restaurants, nightclubs, and art galleries. It is located between Cartagena Bay to the east and the Caribbean Sea to the west, and includes the two neighborhoods of El Laguito (The Little Lake) and Castillogrande (Big Castle). Bocagrande has long beaches, and much commercial activity is found along Avenida San Martín (Saint Martin Avenue).

The beaches of Bocagrande, lying along the northern shore, are made of volcanic sand, which is slightly grayish in color. This makes the water appear muddy, though it is not. There are breakwaters about every 180 meters (200 yd).

On the bay side of the peninsula of Bocagrande is a seawall. In the center of the bay is a statue of the Virgin Mary. The Naval Base is also located in Bocagrande, overlooking the Bay.

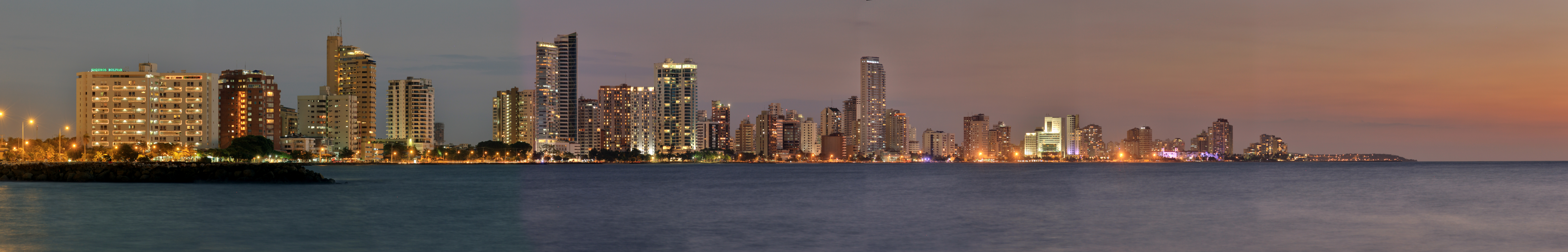
Bocagrande's skyline at twilight from the old town, in 2008

=== Climate ===
Cartagena features a tropical wet and dry climate (Köppen: Aw). Humidity averages around 80%, with the rainy season typically lasting from May to November. The climate tends to be hot and windy.

The Intertropical Convergence Zone (ITCZ) is one of the coastal ocean factors having a bearing on the regional climate.

Climate data for Cartagena (Rafael Núñez International Airport) 1991–2020
Month	Jan	Feb	Mar	Apr	May	Jun	Jul	Aug	Sep	Oct	Nov	Dec	Year
Record high °C (°F)	40.0 (104.0)	38.0 (100.4)	38.0 (100.4)	38.0 (100.4)	40.0 (104.0)	39.8 (103.6)	39.0 (102.2)	38.0 (100.4)	39.6 (103.3)	39.0 (102.2)	40.0 (104.0)	38.0 (100.4)	40.0 (104.0)
Mean daily maximum °C (°F)	31.1 (88.0)	31.1 (88.0)	31.2 (88.2)	31.7 (89.1)	32.0 (89.6)	32.3 (90.1)	32.2 (90.0)	32.2 (90.0)	32.1 (89.8)	31.7 (89.1)	31.5 (88.7)	31.4 (88.5)	31.7 (89.1)
Daily mean °C (°F)	26.9 (80.4)	27.0 (80.6)	27.3 (81.1)	28.1 (82.6)	28.6 (83.5)	28.9 (84.0)	28.6 (83.5)	28.7 (83.7)	28.6 (83.5)	28.3 (82.9)	28.1 (82.6)	27.5 (81.5)	28.0 (82.4)
Mean daily minimum °C (°F)	24.0 (75.2)	24.2 (75.6)	24.9 (76.8)	25.8 (78.4)	26.1 (79.0)	26.1 (79.0)	25.7 (78.3)	25.9 (78.6)	25.8 (78.4)	25.6 (78.1)	25.5 (77.9)	24.8 (76.6)	25.4 (77.7)
Record low °C (°F)	19.0 (66.2)	19.0 (66.2)	19.0 (66.2)	19.5 (67.1)	19.0 (66.2)	19.0 (66.2)	20.0 (68.0)	18.0 (64.4)	18.5 (65.3)	19.0 (66.2)	19.0 (66.2)	18.5 (65.3)	18.0 (64.4)
Average precipitation mm (inches)	0.5 (0.02)	0.3 (0.01)	3.2 (0.13)	18.6 (0.73)	117.4 (4.62)	92.5 (3.64)	121.1 (4.77)	127.5 (5.02)	133.1 (5.24)	236.5 (9.31)	178.3 (7.02)	44.7 (1.76)	1,073.8 (42.28)
Average precipitation days (≥ 1 mm)	0.1	0.1	0.4	2.0	7.0	8.5	8.5	9.5	10.3	12.1	8.9	2.6	70.1
Average relative humidity (%)	81	79	80	81	82	82	81	82	82	83	83	82	81
Mean monthly sunshine hours	272.8	240.1	238.7	210.0	192.2	189.0	207.7	198.4	171.0	170.5	186.0	241.8	2,518.2
Mean daily sunshine hours	8.8	8.5	7.7	7.0	6.2	6.3	6.7	6.4	5.7	5.5	6.2	7.8	6.9
Mean daily daylight hours	11.6	11.8	12.1	12.4	12.6	12.7	12.7	12.5	12.2	11.9	11.7	11.5	12.1
Percentage possible sunshine	75.9	66.6	63.8	56.6	49.3	49.5	52.9	51.4	46.8	46.2	53.2	67.7	56.7
Average ultraviolet index	11	11	13	15	13	13	12	13	13	13	11	10	12
Source 1: Instituto de Hidrología, Meteorología y Estudios Ambientales (humidity, sun 1971–2010)
Source 2: Weather Atlas(daylight) Nomadseason(UV index)

== Demographics ==
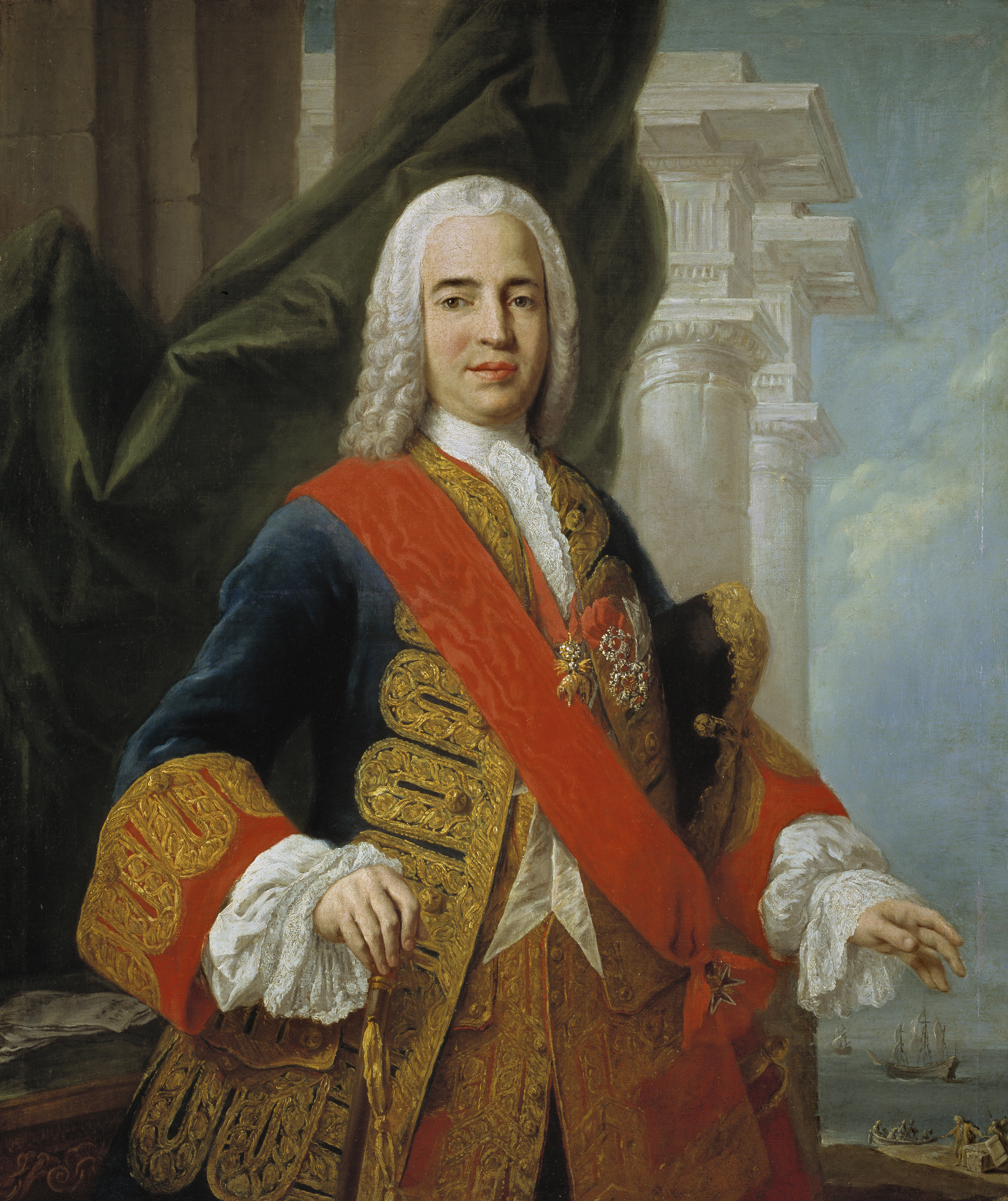
The Marquis of Ensenada was Minister for America and responsible for many policies, one of which resulted in the first modern census in the city in 1778.

Historical population

Year	Pop.	±%
1533	200	—
1564	2,400	+1100.0%
1593	3,543	+47.6%
1612	5,302	+49.6%
1634	8,390	+58.2%
1643	12,302	+46.6%
1698	14,223	+15.6%
1701	10,230	−28.1%
1732	12,932	+26.4%
1762	14,203	+9.8%
1778	16,940	+19.3%
1792	19,380	+14.4%

Year	Pop.	±%
1803	23,402	+20.8%
1811	29,320	+25.3%
1821	5,392	−81.6%
1832	8,001	+48.4%
1842	4,221	−47.2%
1853	6,403	+51.7%
1867	8,320	+29.9%
1870	7,680	−7.7%
1882	13,994	+82.2%
1890	17,392	+24.3%
1900	21,220	+22.0%
1912	29,922	+41.0%

Year	Pop.	±%
1918	34,203	+14.3%
1926	64,322	+88.1%
1939	87,504	+36.0%
1952	123,439	+41.1%
1967	299,493	+142.6%
1976	312,520	+4.3%
1985	554,093	+77.3%
1993	725,072	+30.9%
1999	837,552	+15.5%
2005	893,033	+6.6%
2018	973,035	+9.0%

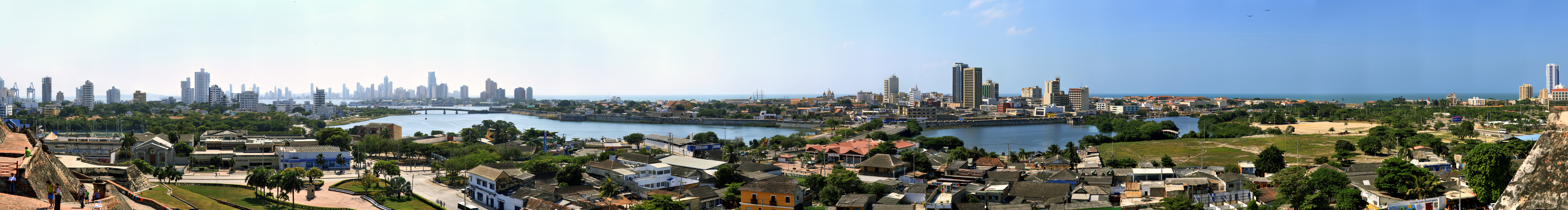
Panorama of Cartagena from the San Felipe de Barajas Fort, in 2008

=== Ethnic composition ===
According to the figures presented by DANE from the 2005 census, the ethnographic composition of the city is:

- Whites and Mestizos: 63.2%
- Black, mulatto, Afro-Colombian or Afro-descendant: 36.1%
- Palenquero: 0.3%
- Indigenous: 0.2%
- ROM: 0.1%
- Raizal: 0.1%

== Economy ==
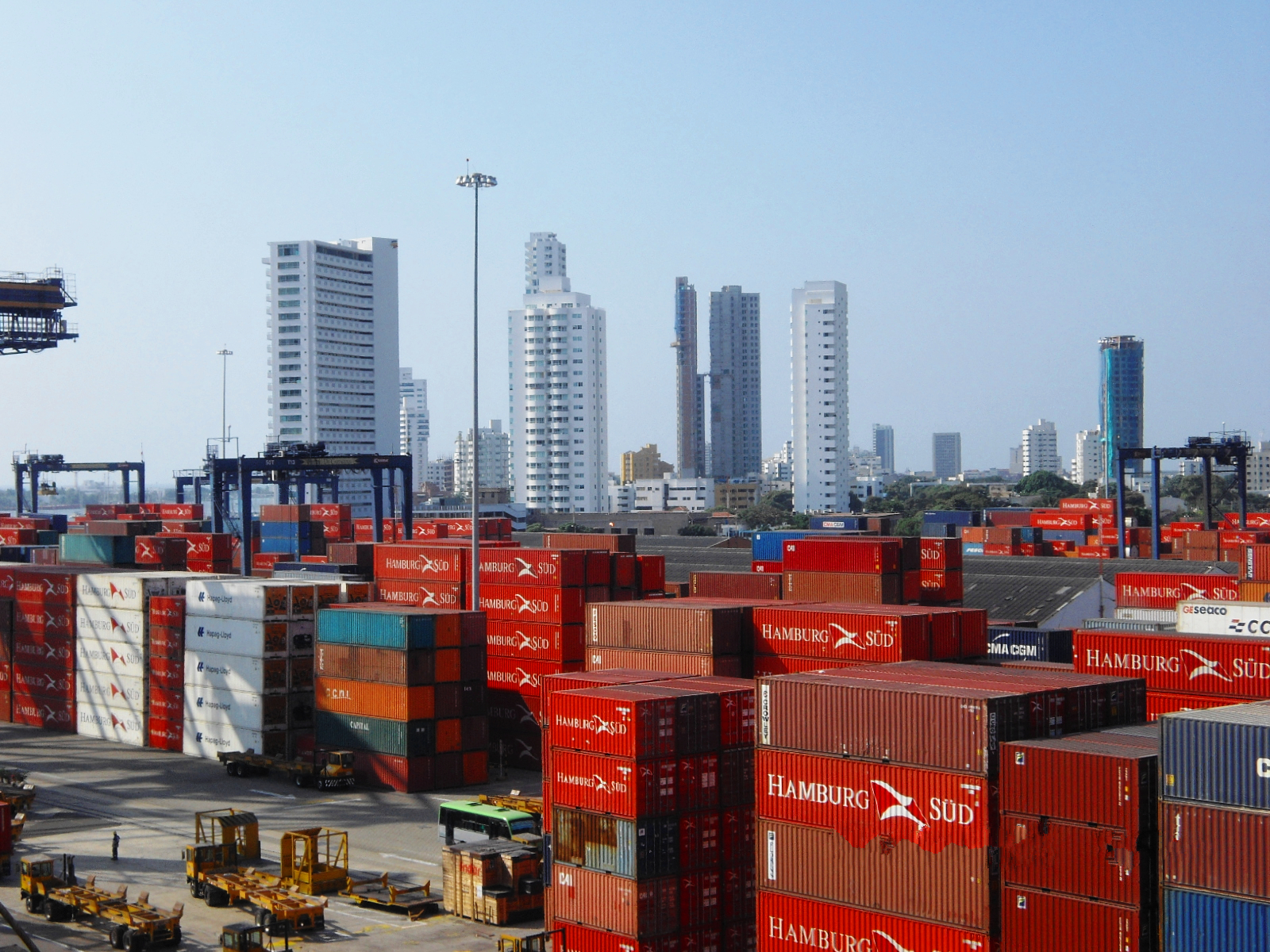
Port of Cartagena de Indias

The main economic activities in Cartagena are industry, tourism, and commerce. The port of Cartagena is one of the largest in South America.

=== Industry ===
Other prominent companies include Cementos Argos, Miss Colombia, Kola Román, Indufrial, Amazon Pepper, Vikings SA, Distribuidora Ltda Refrigeration, Central Ingenio Colombia, Perfumery Lemaitre, Cartagena Refinery Cellux Colombiana SA, Flour Three Castles, Polyban International SA, SABMiller, Dow Chemical, Cemex, Dole, and Abocol.

=== Miss Colombia ===
In 1934, Miss Colombia was founded in Cartagena de Indias. Known as Concurso Nacional de Belleza de Colombia (National Beauty Contest of Colombia), it is a national beauty pageant in Colombia. The winner, Señorita Colombia, is sent to Miss Supranational and the first runner-up, Señorita Colombia Internacional or Virreina, to Miss International.

There is also a local beauty contest held, with many of the city's neighbourhoods nominating young women to be named Miss Independence.

=== Free zones ===
Free zones are areas within the local territory that enjoy special customs and tax rules. They are intended to promote the industrialization of goods and provision of services aimed primarily at foreign markets and also the domestic market.

- Parque Central Zona Franca: Opened in 2012, the zone is located in the municipality of Turbaco, within the District of Cartagena de Indias. It covers an area of 115 hectares (284 1/4 acres). It has a permamente Zone (Phase 1 – Phase 2) and a Logistics and Commercial Zone for SMEs.
- Zona Franca Industrial Goods and Services ZOFRANCA Cartagena SA: located 14 kilometers (8 3/4 miles) from the city center, at the end of the industrial sector, and has the Mamonal private dock.
- Zona Franca Turística en Isla De Barú: located on the island of Barú, within the swamp Portonaito. Approved in 1993 the tourist zone offers waterways, marine tourism and urban development.

=== Tourism ===
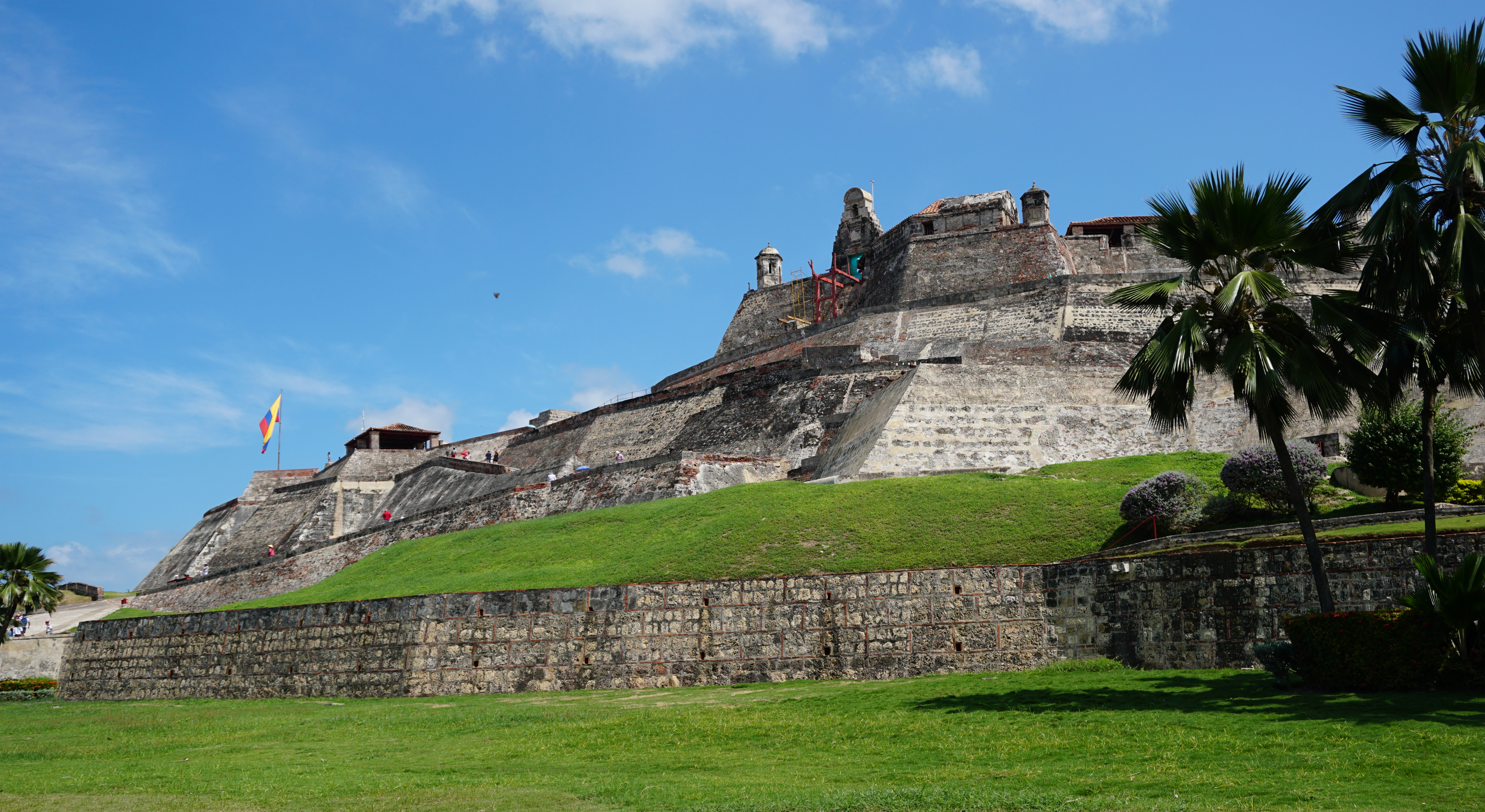
Castle of San Felipe de Barajas, just outside the walled city

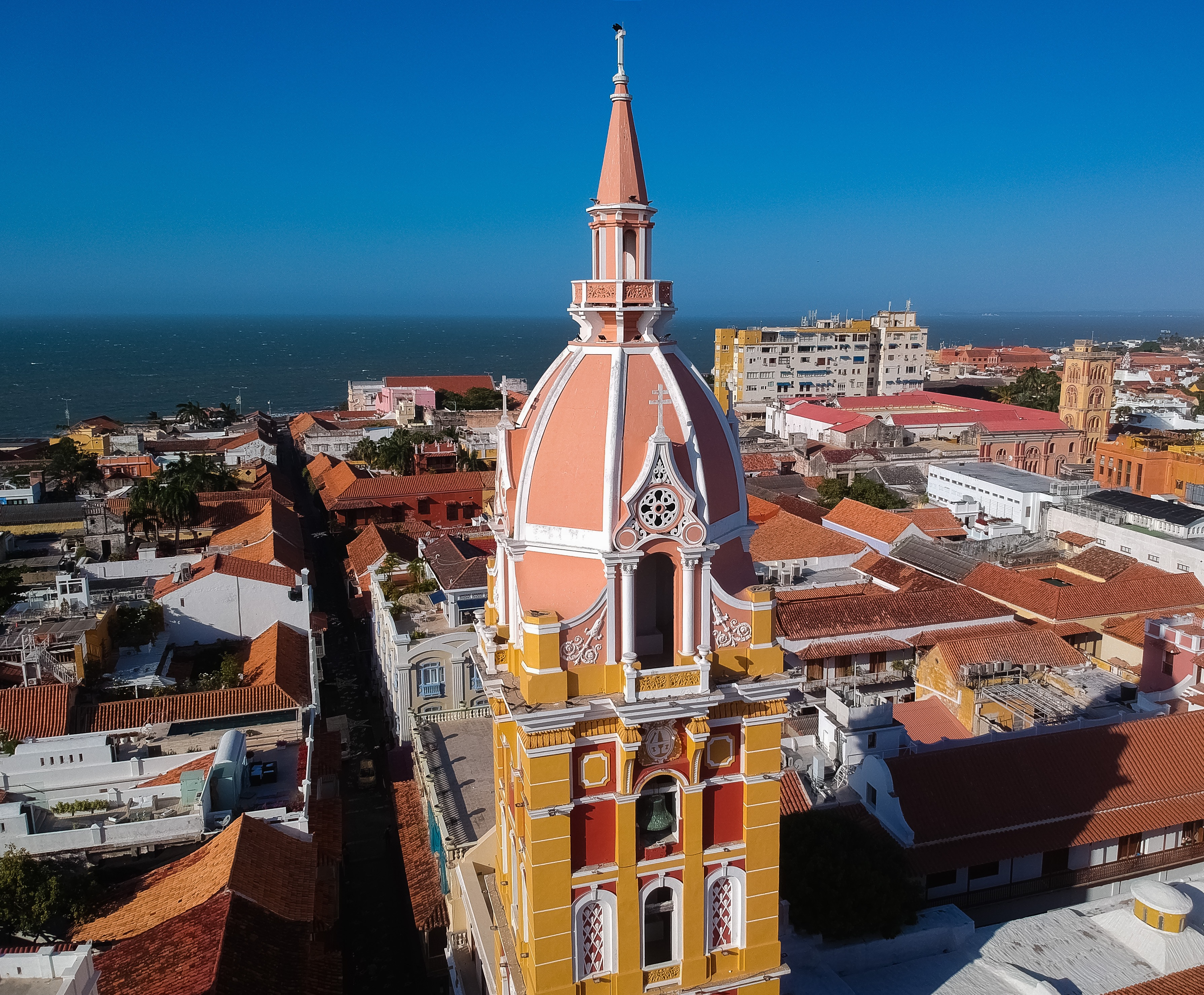
The Cartagena Cathedral was built between 1577 and 1612 and has been preserved today almost unchanged.

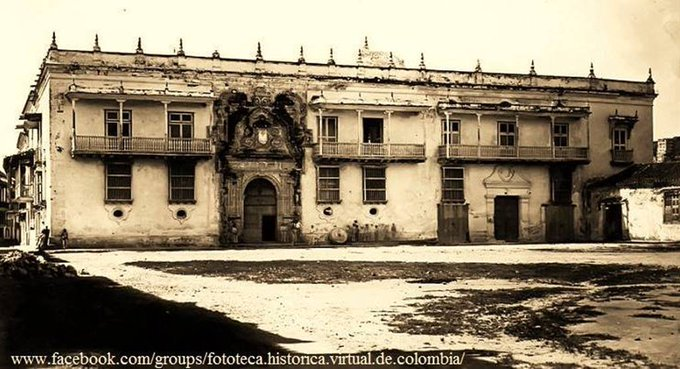
The Palace of the Inquisition in 1875

The Casa del Marqués de Valdehoyos (to the right) built in 1765

Tourism is a mainstay of the economy. The following are tourist sites that are within the walled city of Cartagena:

- Colonial architecture with Andalusian style roots. Many of the houses in Cartagena have balconies with tropical flowers.
- Convent, cloister and chapel of Nuestra Señora de la Candelaria de la Popa, located at the top of Mount Popa
- Cathedral of Santa Catalina de Alejandría
- Church and cloister of San Pedro Claver
- Convent and church of Santo Domingo
- Palace of Inquisition
- Teatro Heredia
- Cartagena Gold Museum
- Las Bóvedas
- Clock Tower
- Fortresses in Cartagena de Indias: Of the twenty fortresses comprising the walls in the district of Getsemaní, today 16 are still standing, preserved in good condition. In 1586, the most famous military engineer of the Crown of Spain at the time, the Italian Battista Antonelli, was commissioned to fortify the city. The works of the project finally ended in the 17th century. Cartagena became an impregnable bastion, which successfully resisted the attacks of Baron Pontis until 1697. In the 18th century, new additions gave the fortified complex its current amplitude by engineer Antonio de Arévalo. The initial fortification system includes only the urban precinct, the bastion port of San Matías at the entrance to the passage of Bocagrande, and the Tower of San Felipe del Boquerón that controlled the Bay of las Ánimas. Gradually, all passages were dominated by fortresses: the fortress of San Luis, the fortress of San José and the fortress of San Fernando in Bocachica, the fortress of San Rafaél and fortress of Santa Bárbara in Pochachica (the passage to the southwest), the fortress of Santa Cruz, the fortress of San Juan de Manzanillo; and the fortress of San Sebastián de Pastellilo around the interior of Bahía; the castle of San Felipe de Barajas, on the rock that dominates the city from the east and provides access to protect the Isthmus del Cerebro. The fortifications of San Felipe de Barajas in Cartagena protected the city during numerous sieges, giving it an unassailable character and reputation. These are described as a masterpiece of Spanish military engineering in the Americas.

The city has a budding hotel industry, with small boutique hotels primarily concentrated in the Walled City and larger hotels in the beachfront neighborhood of Bocagrande. The area of Getsemaní just outside the wall is also a popular place for small hotels and hostels.

The following are tourist sites that are outside the city of Cartagena:

- Las Islas del Rosario: These islands are one of Colombia's most important national parks. Most of the islands can be reached in an hour or less from the city docks.

== Infrastructure ==
In terms of both passenger and freight transport, at domestic and international level, combining air and water transport, Cartagena of Indias is globally-known as the Hub of the Caribbean due to its strategic geographical position in the Americas, linked to its major economical importance (mainly tourism services and shipyard industry).

=== Transport ===
As the commercial and touristic hub of the country, the city has many transportation facilities, particularly in the seaport, air, and fluvial areas.

==== Buses ====
In 2003, the city started building Transcaribe, a mass transit system. In 2015, the system began operating in the city. Taxis are also a prevalent form of public transportation, and there is a bus terminal connecting the city to other cities along the coast and in Colombia.

Cartagena has problems with traffic congestion.

==== Rail ====
A commuter train connecting Cartagena de Indias with other cities in the Colombian Caribbean coast is under planning, plus an Atlantic-Pacific inter-oceanic rail connection as an alternative to the Panama Channel.

==== Roads ====
The city is linked to the northern part of the Caribbean Region through roads 90 and 90A, more commonly called the Central Caribbean Road. This road passes through Barranquilla, Santa Marta and Riohacha, ending in Paraguachón, Venezuela, and continues with Venezuelan numeration all the way to Caracas. Taxis in the city perimeter do not have fare meters.

The following roads are in the southeast portion of the city: Road 25: Going through Turbaco and Arjona, and through the Montes de María, where a fork divides it, continuing to Sincelejo as National 25 and finally ending in Medellín, and to the east to Valledupar as number 80.

Road 25 A: Also going to Sincelejo, but avoiding the mountains, connects with Road 25 in the aforementioned city.

==== Air ====
The Rafael Núñez International Airport is the busiest airport in Colombia's Caribbean region and the fourth in passenger traffic in the country. The code of the airport is CTG, with flights to almost all airports in Colombia, including Bogotá's El Dorado International Airport. High operational costs, easier connection travel, and better prices have led to the shifting of Rafael Núñez's international connection passengers away from Bogotá to the nearer Tocumen International Airport in Panama and Queen Beatrix International Airport in Aruba. Also, more companies prefer to serve the Colombian market from Cartagena, due to better geographical and atmospheric conditions.

==== Sea ====
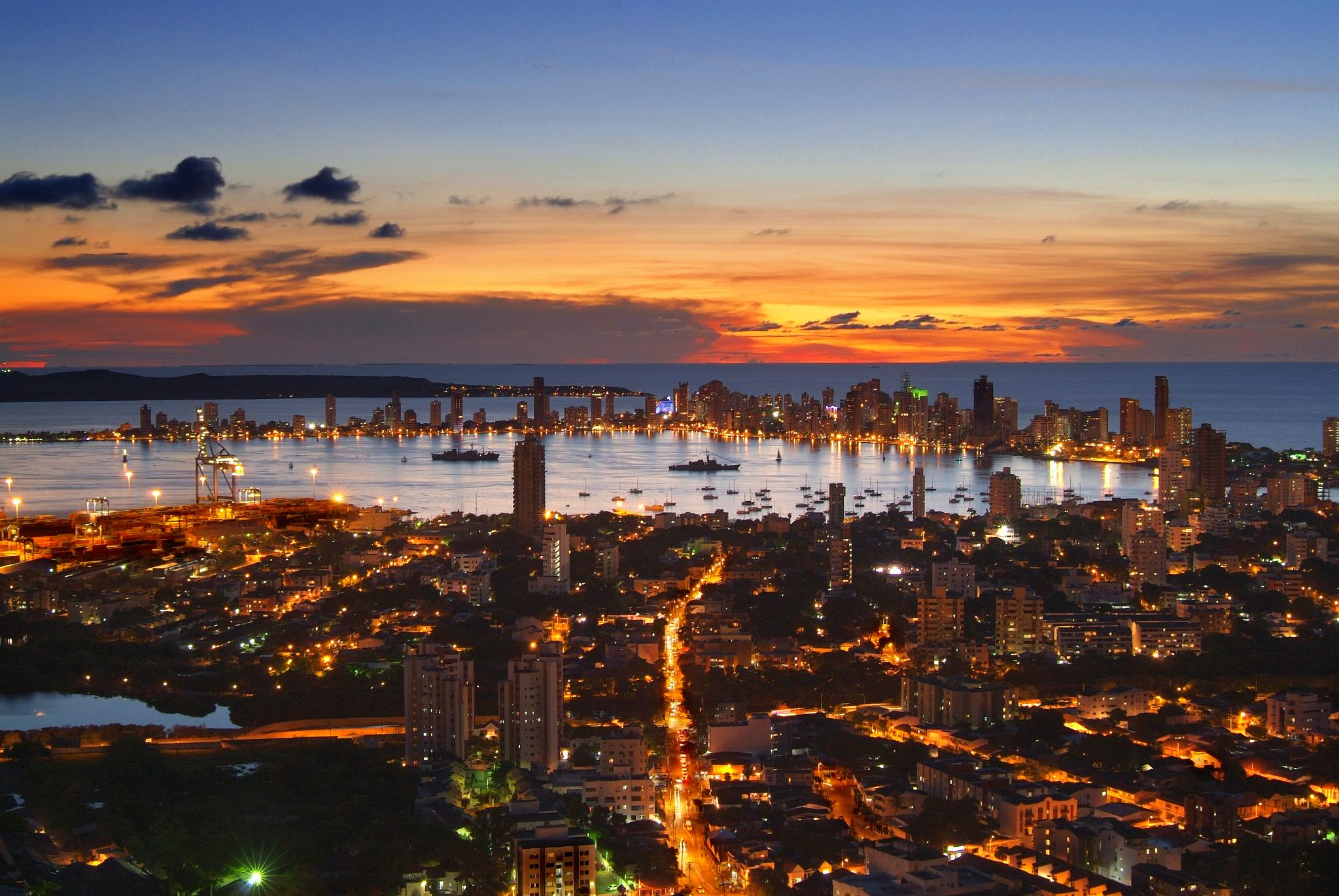
Sunset over Cartagena Harbor as seen from La Popa

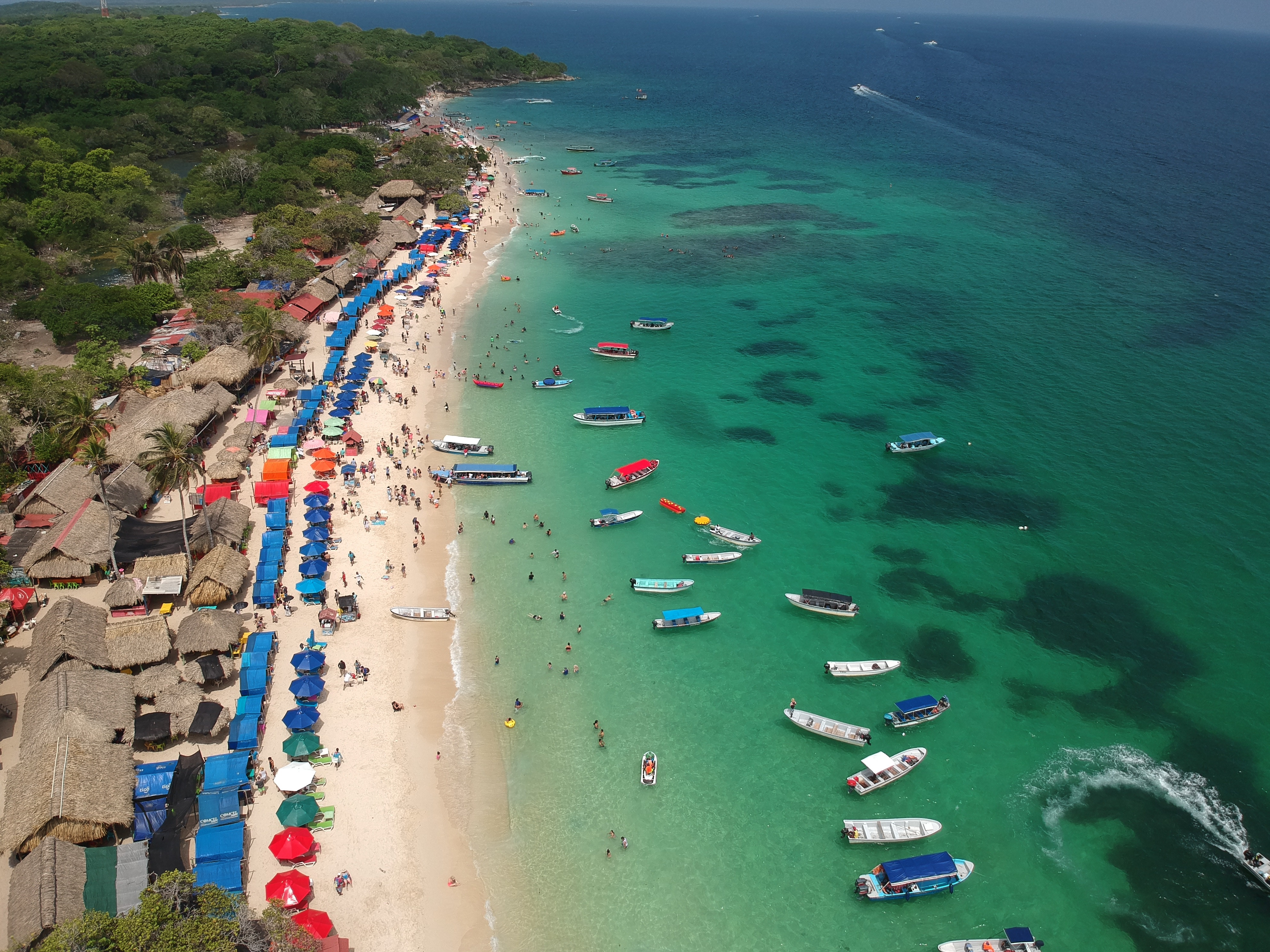
Playa Blanca Beach, Isla Barú, Cartagena

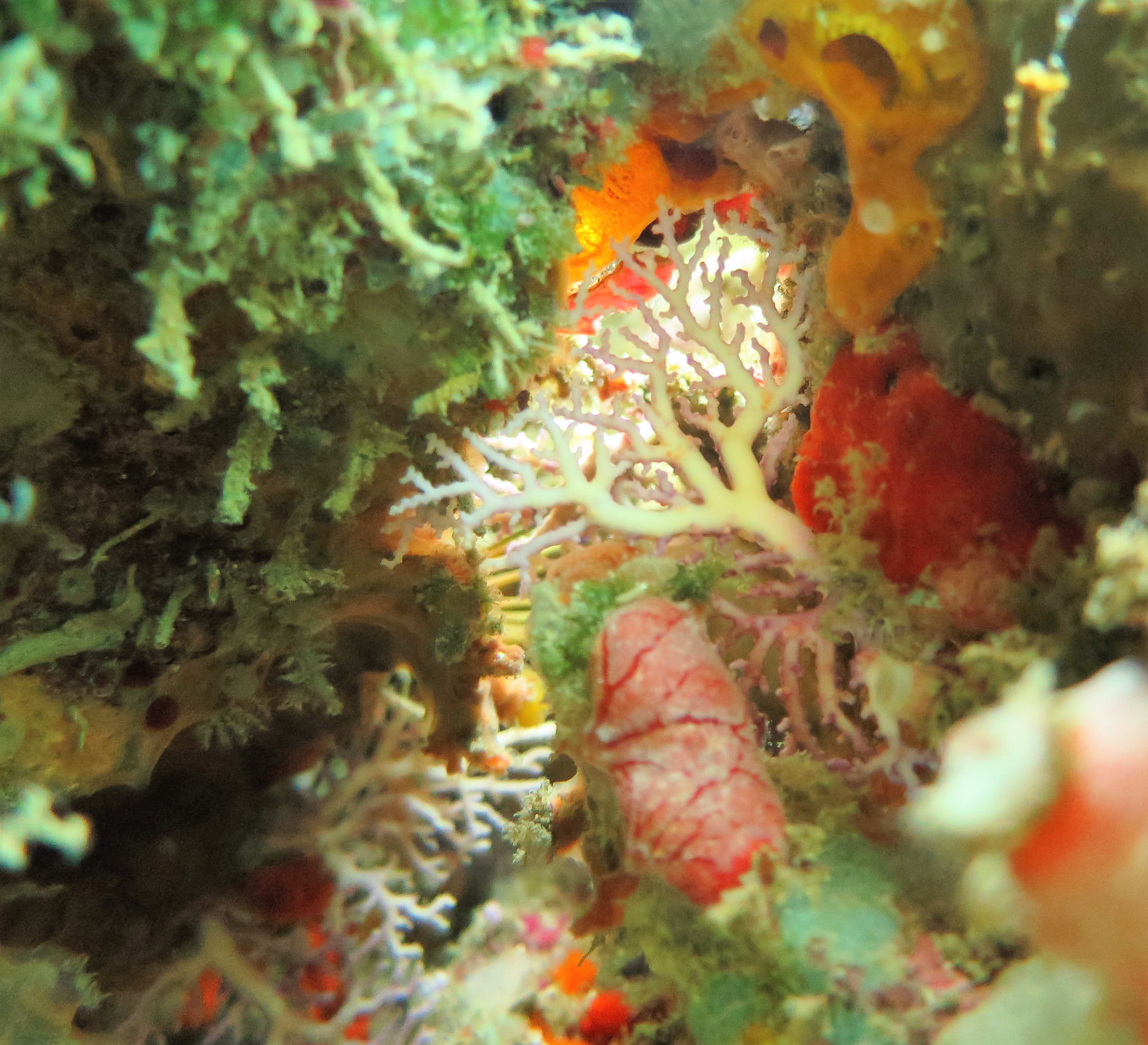
The endangered Varadero Coral Reef in Cartagena Bay

Cartagena is the most important port of Colombia in the Caribbean.

The open ports of the city are:

- Port Society of Cartagena - Specializing in container management, this port is the first of its kind in the country, the third busiest port on the Caribbean Sea, and ranked 99th among ports in the world.
- Muelles El Bosque (El Bosque Docks) – specialized in grain storage, expanding to the container market
- Container Terminal of Cartagena – container management

Private ports of the city:

- The port of the Cartagena Oil Refinery (REFICAR S.A.)
- SABMiller brewery port
- Argos cement port
- Dow Chemical raw materials embarkment port
- BASF Colombia raw materials embarkment port
- Du Pont private embarkment port
- Cemex cement port
- Dole packing house
- Colombian Navy steelworks port

==== River ====
Since the 17th century, the bay has been connected to the Magdalena River by the Dique Canal, built by Governor Pedro Zapata de Mendoza. After Colombian independence, the canal was abandoned. Increasing centralization left the city without resources to maintain it. The last important maintenance work was done in the 1950s during Laureano Gómez's administration. Some improvements were made by local authorities in the 1980s. This was discontinued because of legal objections from the central government that decreed that the "maintenance" of the canal did not fall under the jurisdiction of the local government. From then on, maintenance of the canal has been delayed, though it is still functional.

Cartagenian political leaders have argued that this state of affairs might change with a return to pre-independence funding and tax system. Under such systems, the canal would be maintained properly and even expanded, benefiting the national economy.

=== Waste disposal ===
Cartagena is one of the few cities in the world with a marine outfall, inaugurated in 2013, whose 4.3-kilometer (2.7 mi)-long underwater section is the third longest in the world.

== Education ==
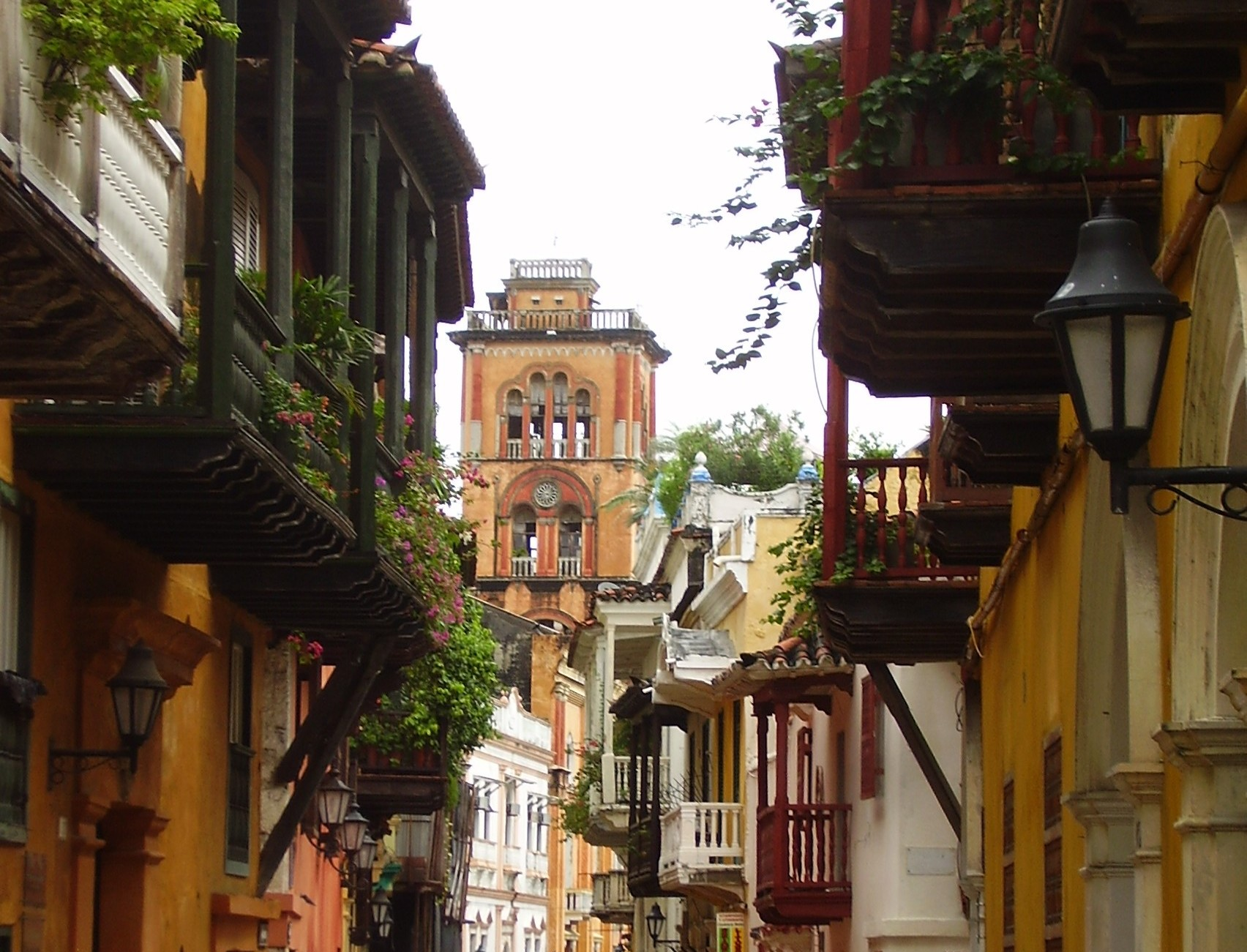
The Convent of San Agustín at background, convent built in 16th-century, and since 1828 is occupied by the University of Cartagena. Currently, of the original structure of this convent remain only the cloister, the arches, and the supporting walls. The tower is of Italian Revival style, as is the large interior garden and courtyard.

=== Colleges and universities ===
- University of Cartagena
- Universidad Tecnológica de Bolívar

=== Primary and secondary schools ===
International schools include:

- Corporación Educativa Colegio Británico de Cartagena (British)
- Gimnasio Cartagena de Indias (International)
- Colegio Jorge Washington (American)

=== Libraries ===
The city has many public and private libraries:

- The Universidad de Cartagena José Fernández Madrid Library: Started in 1821 when the university opened as the "University of Magdalena and Isthmus". Serves mainly the students and faculty of this university, but anyone can use its services.

Divided into buildings across the city, assigned to the Faculties it serves, each area accordingly. The main building is in C. de la Universidad 64, and the second-biggest section is located in Av. José Vicente Mogollón 2839.

- The Bartolomé Calvo Library: Founded in 1843 and established in its current place in 1900, it is one of the main libraries on the Caribbean Coast and the largest in the city. Its address is Calle de la Inquisición, 23.
- The History Academy of Cartagena de Indias Library: Opened in 1903, many of its books date from more than a century earlier, from donations of members and benefactors. Its entrance is more restricted due to secure handling procedures, as ancient books require, but it can be requested at the academy office in Plaza de Bolívar 112.
- The Technological University of Bolívar Library: Opened in 1985. Although small in general size, its sections on engineering and electronics are immense, and its demand is mostly in this area, being located in Camino de Arroyohondo 1829.
- The American Hispanic Culture Library: Opened in 1999, it already existed as a smaller version without Spanish funding in the Casa de España since the early 1940s, but in 1999 it was enlarged to serve Latin America and the Caribbean in the old convent of Santo Domingo. It specializes in Hispanic Culture and History and is a continental epicenter of seminaries on history and restoration of buildings. The restoration of the convent and the enlargement of the library was and still is a personal project of Juan Carlos I of Spain, who visits it regularly. It is located in Plaza Santo Domingo 30, but its entrance is in C. Gastelbondo 52.
- Jorge Artel Library: Opened in 1997, serves the area of the southwest districts of the city; it is mostly for children. It is located at Camino del Socorro 222
- Balbino Carreazo Library: Located in Pasacaballos, a suburban neighborhood of the southeastern part of the city, it serves mostly the suburbs of Pasacaballos, Ararca, Leticia del Dique, and Matunilla. It is located at Plaza de Pasacaballos 321
- District Libraries: Although small, this system goes grassroots to neighborhoods, circulating books; generally, each district library has around 5000 books.

== Culture ==
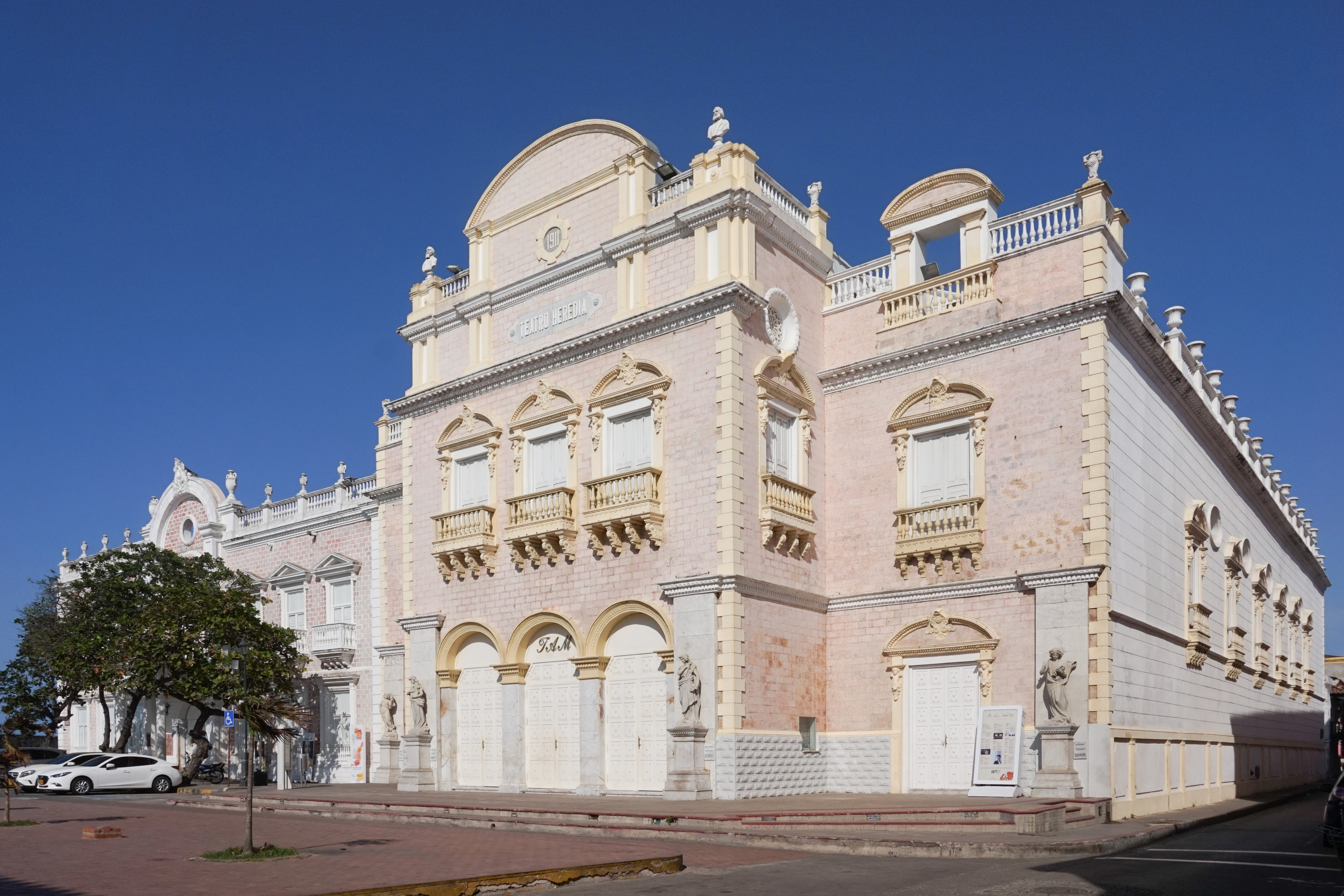
Teatro Adolfo Mejía was opened in 1911.

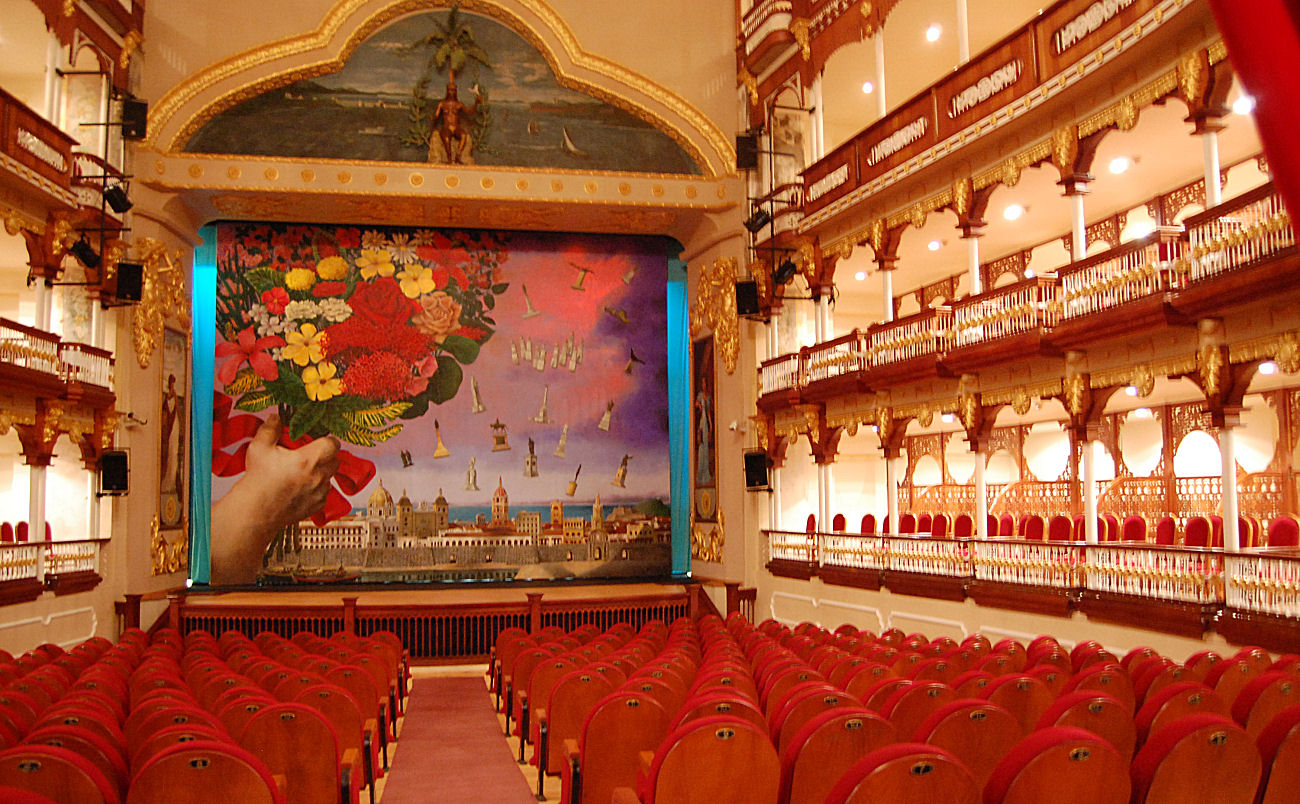
Interior of the Teatro Adolfo Mejía

=== Theaters and concert halls ===
The first carnivals and western theaters that served in New Granada operated on what is today Calle del Coliseo. This was an activity patronized by the Viceroy Manuel de Guirior and Antonio Caballero y Góngora, who, like their predecessors, spent most of the time of their mandates ruling in Cartagena.

- Teatro Adolfo Mejía: former Teatro Heredia, opened in 1911, inspired by the Teatro Tacón of Havana, was designed by José Enrique Jaspe. After years of abandonment, it was rebuilt in the 1990s and continues to be a cultural center. It is located in Plazuela de La Merced 5.

=== Sport ===
Baseball is the most popular sport in Cartagena, Tigres de Cartagena represent the city in the Colombian Professional Baseball League, playing at Estadio Once de Noviembre. Other historical baseball teams that once represented Cartagena include Indios, Águilas, and Torices.

The main football club in the city is Real Cartagena.

In August 2024, Cartagena co-hosted the 2024 U-15 Baseball World Cup with Barranquilla.

=== Museums and galleries ===
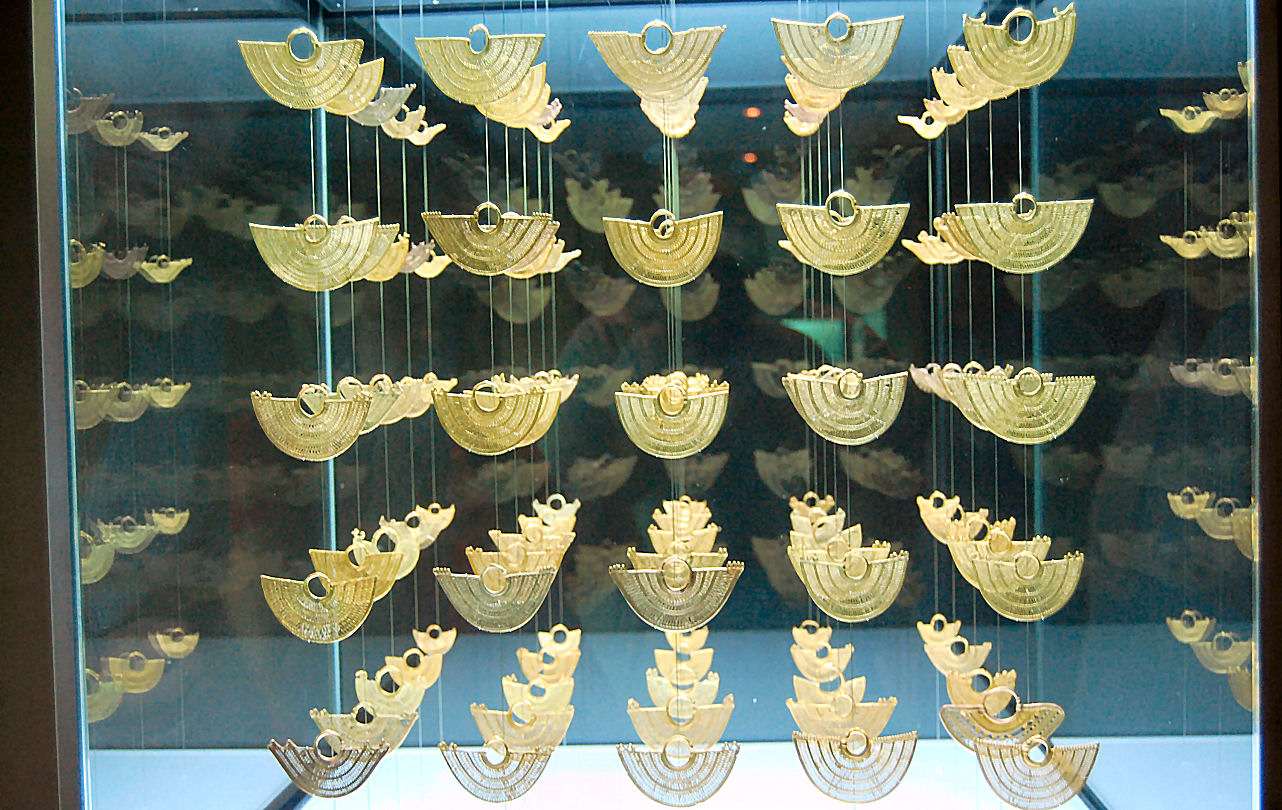
The Museo del Oro contains an important collection of over 600 pieces, of gold and pottery, of the pre-Columbian Zenú indigenous culture.

- City Museum Palace of the Inquisition, opened in the 1970s
- Sanctuary and Museum of St. Maria Bernarda Bütler (foundress of the Franciscan Missionary Sisters of Our Lady of Perpetual Help)

=== World Heritage site ===
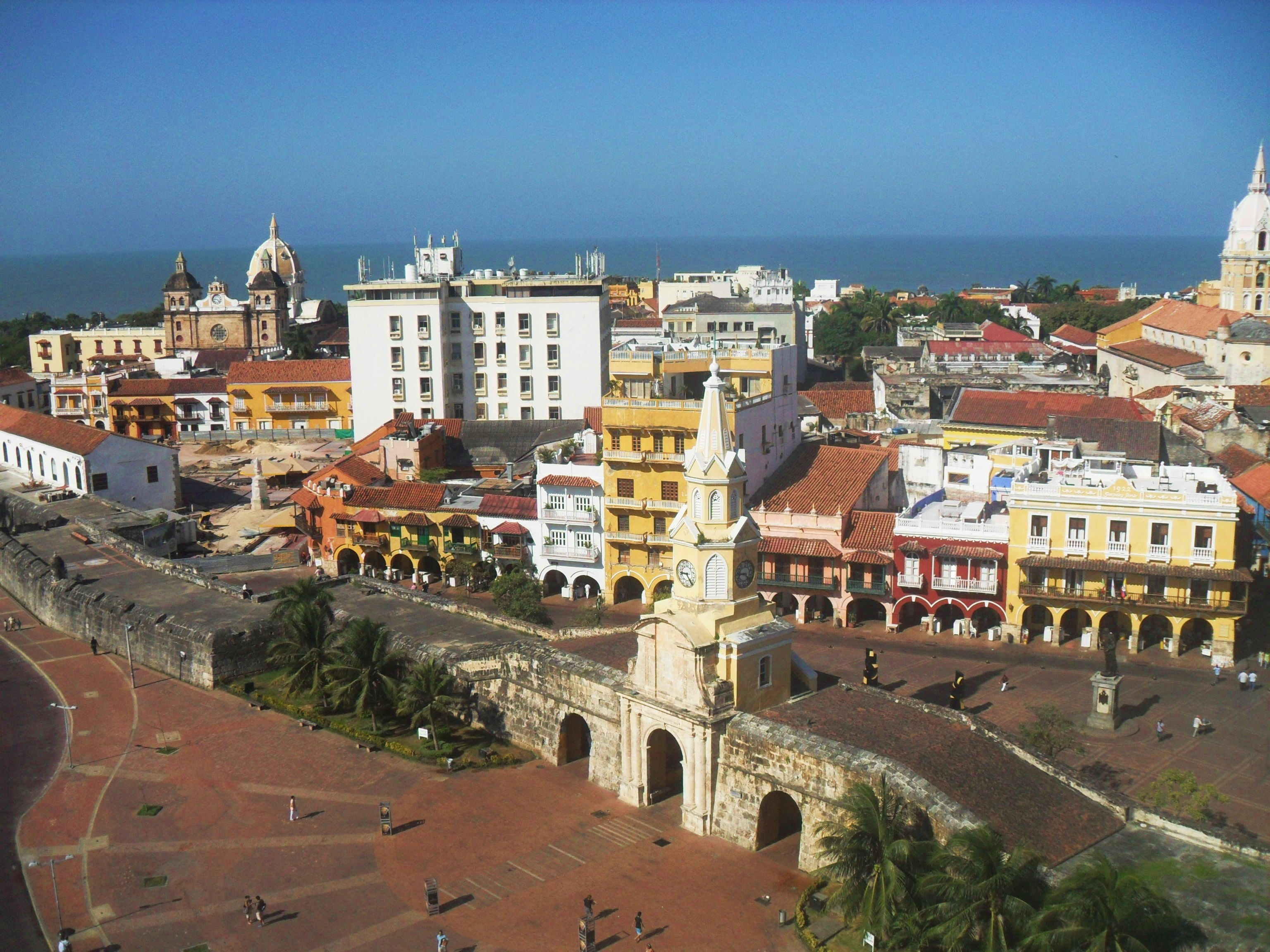
An aerial view of the historic center

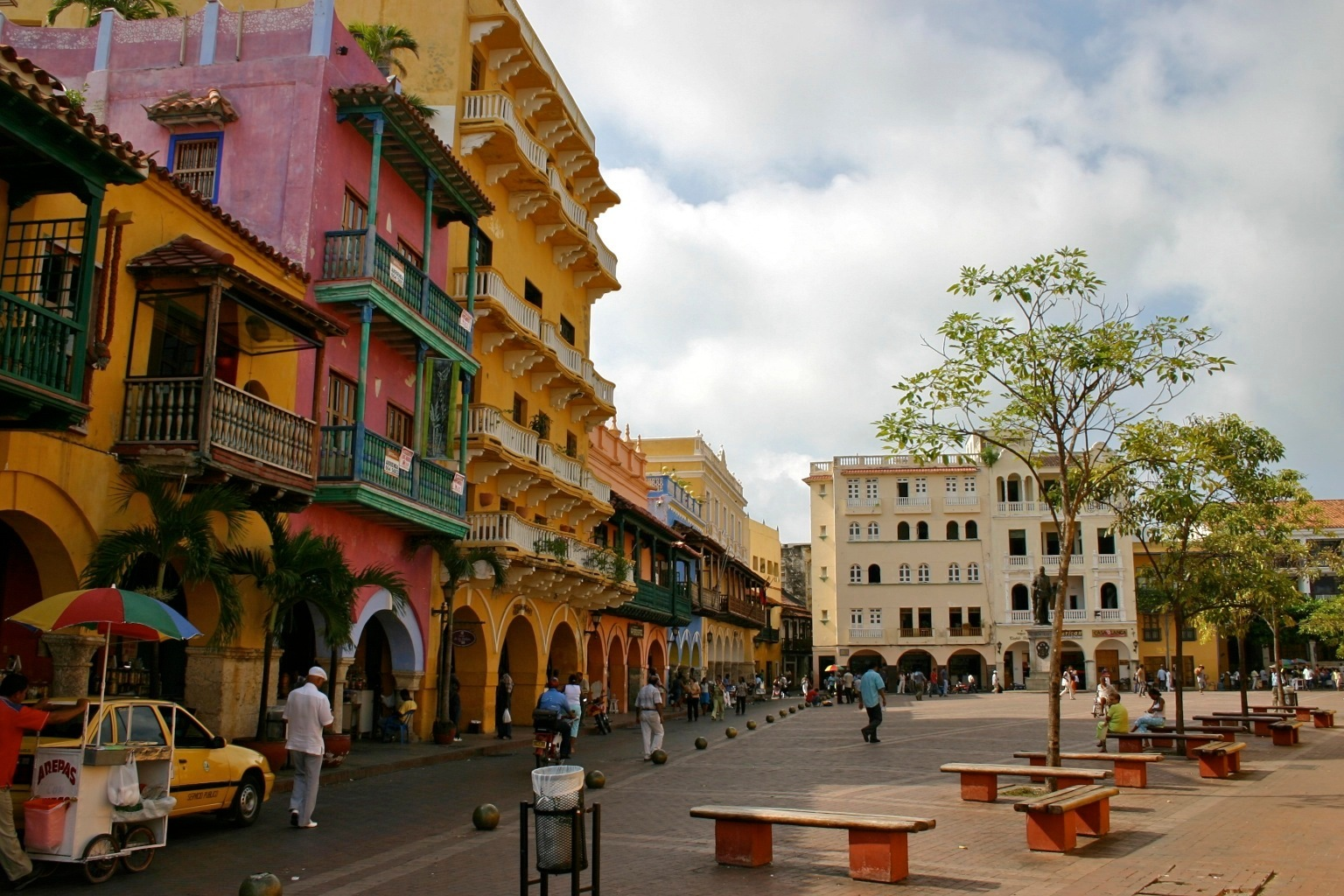
Colonial Plaza de los Coches

The port, the fortresses, and the group of monuments of Cartagena were selected in 1984 by the United Nations Educational, Scientific and Cultural Organization (UNESCO) as significant to the heritage of the world, having the most extensive fortifications in South America. They are significant, too, for being located in a bay that is part of the Caribbean Sea. A system of zones divides the city into three neighborhoods: San Sebastian and Santa Catalina with the cathedral and many palaces where the wealthy lived and the main government buildings functioned; San Diego or Santo Toribio, where merchants and the middle class lived; and Getsemani, the suburban popular quarters.

=== Festivities ===
- January: The "Cartagena International Music Festival" (Cartagena Festival Internacional de Música), a classical music event that has become one of the most important festivals in the country. It is held in the Walled City for 10 days, during which classes and conferences are held, and it features the presence of national and international artists.
  - "Fiesta Taurina del Caribe" (Caribbean Bullfighting festival) (ultimately canceled, for maintenance of the scenario)
  - "SummerLand Festival": Electronic music festival most important in the country
- February: "Fiestas de Nuestra Señora de la Candelaria" (Feasts of Our Lady of Candelaria),
  - "Festival del Frito"
- March: "International Film Festival of Cartagena" (Festival Internacional de Cine de Cartagena)
  - "Miss Colombia"
  - "Feria Náutica"
- April: "Festival del Dulce" (Festival of the Sweets)
- June–July: "Festival de Verano" (Summer Festival)
  - "Sail Cartagena"
- November: "Fiestas del 11 de noviembre" (Feasts of 11 November or of the Independence)
- December: "Jazz Festival under the Moon" (Festival de Jazz bajo la Luna)
  - "Cartagena Rock"

== Media appearances ==
=== Film ===
- Burn! (1969), with Marlon Brando, was filmed in Cartagena.
- In the movie Romancing the Stone (1984), romance novelist Joan Wilder (Kathleen Turner) travels to Cartagena to deliver a treasure map, in an effort to ransom her kidnapped sister. The Cartagena scenes were actually filmed in Mexico. In the movie, Michael Douglas' character refers to it as Cartage(ny)a. This has largely been adopted by tourists and is an irritant to the locals. The "N" in Cartagena is hard.
- The film The Mission (1986), with Robert De Niro, was filmed in Cartagena and Brazil
- The film Love in the Time of Cholera (2007) was filmed in Cartagena.
- Scenes of Gemini Man (2019), with Will Smith, were filmed in Cartagena.
- Scenes of the (2023) film Sound of Freedom

=== Television ===
- In the Family Guy episode "Barely Legal", the mayor, thinking the events of Romancing the Stone (see above) are real, sends all the city's police officers to Cartagena
- Cartagena figured prominently in the "Smuggler's Blues" (1985) episode of Miami Vice, featuring guest star Glenn Frey and his song "Smuggler's Blues"
- Cartagena is featured as the backdrop for the NCIS episodes "Agent Afloat" and "The Missionary Position".
- The 30th installment of MTV's reality competition series, titled The Challenge XXX: Dirty 30, was filmed in Cartagena.
- In the Orphan Black episode "To Right the Wrongs of Many", Delphine and Cosima are in Cartagena, where Delphine is giving the cure to the Leda clone found there.
- The Colombian Netflix show Siempre Bruja (Always a Witch) is set in Cartagena.
- In The Amazing Race 28, the second and third legs were set in Cartagena and required teams to visit various locations throughout the city.
- In Season 10 of The Real Housewives of New York City, the annual cast vacation takes place in Cartagena.

=== Literature ===
- A fictionalized version of the 1697 raid on Cartagena is chronicled in the novel Captain Blood (1922).
- Gabriel García Márquez's novel Love in the Time of Cholera is set in an unnamed city based on Cartagena. García Márquez has also said that Cartagena influenced the setting of The Autumn of the Patriarch. His novel Of Love and Other Demons takes place in Cartagena in the 1600s.
- The first chapter of Brian Jacques' novel The Angel's Command (2003) takes place in Cartagena in 1628.
- The poem "Románc" (1983) by Sándor Kányádi talks about the beauty of Cartagena.
- The second story in Nam Le's award-winning book of short fiction, The Boat (2008), is called "Cartagena" and is set in Colombia. Cartagena in the story is more an idea than a place.
- A portion of the 2014 novel The Bone Clocks by David Mitchell (author) is set in the city.
- A 2015 novel by Claudia Amengual is named Cartagena.
- The poem "A mi ciudad nativa" is in honor of Cartagena

=== Video games ===
- The city is the scene of two levels in the video game Uncharted 3: Drake's Deception.

=== Music ===
Champeta is a musical genre whose main variants are rooted in Cartagena and Barranquilla.

- On the album Corazón Profundo, Carlos Vives honored the city of Cartagena, calling it "The Fantastic City" (in Spanish: La fantástica).
- The 2016 song "Otra Vez" by Zion & Lennox mentions Cartagena.
- The song "1741 (The Battle of Cartagena)" by Alestorm off their 2014 Album Sunset on the Golden Age is about the 1741 siege of Cartagena.

== Notable people ==
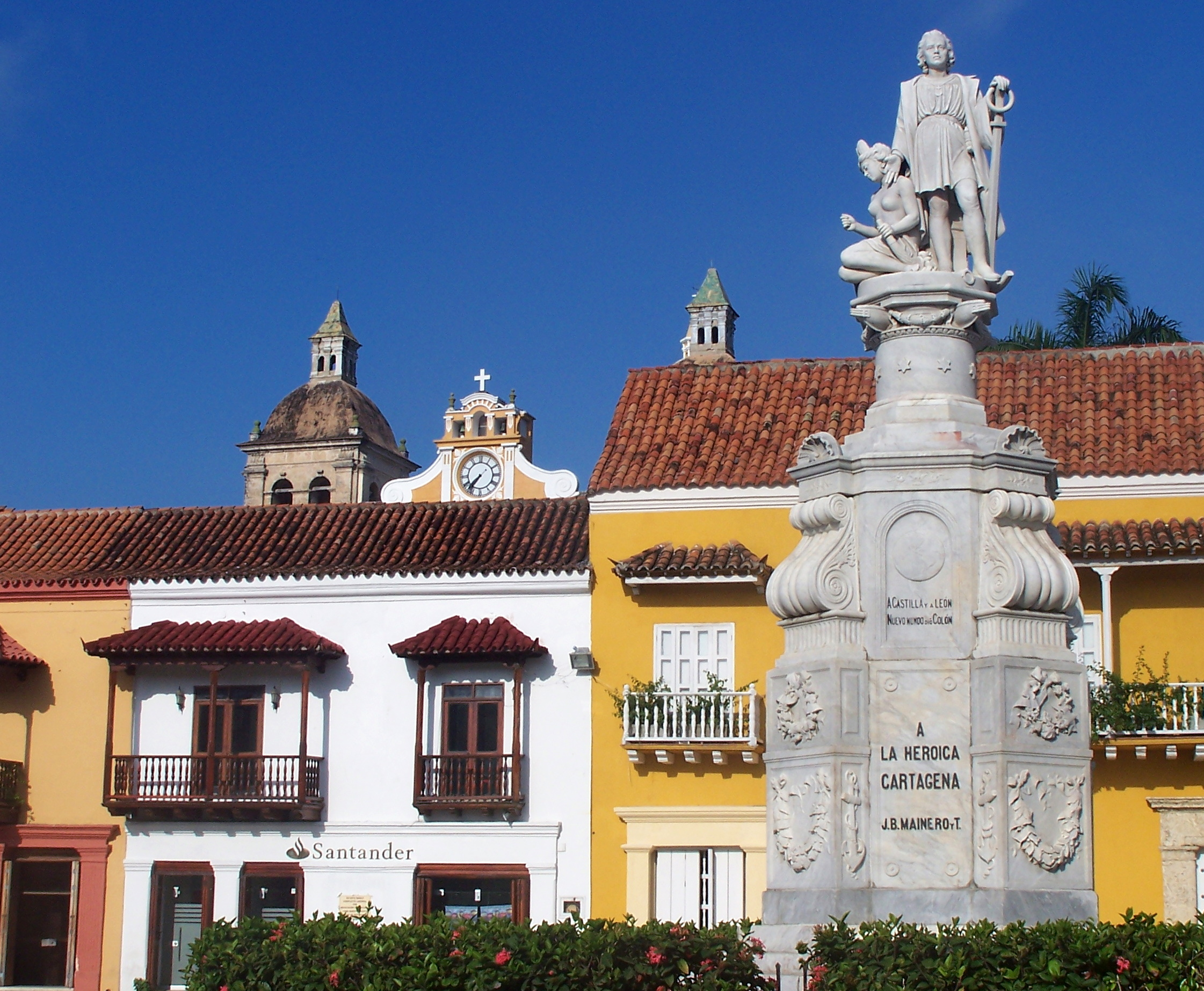
Plaza de la Aduana square. Cartagena la heróica

- Joe Arroyo, salsa music composer and singer
- Miguel Avila, indoor/outdoor footballer and referee
- Valeria Ayos, Miss Universe Colombia 2021
- Alvaro Barrios, conceptual artist
- Bartolomé Calvo, politician, journalist, Governor of Panama (1856–58), President of the Granadine Confederation in 1861
- Flavio Caballero, actor
- Bernardo Caraballo, boxer
- Alfonso Múnera Cavadía, diplomat and historian
- Antonio Cervantes, boxer
- Saint Peter Claver SJ, Jesuit priest, pastor and missionary to the enslaved people brought to Cartagena ("Slave of the slaves forever"), human rights advocate. Beatified 1850 by Pope Pius IX, canonized 1888 by Pope Leo XIII. 1985, the Colombian Congress declared 9 September, his feast day, as Human Rights national day in his honor.
- William Dau, former Mayor of Cartagena
- Germán Espinosa, writer, author of "La Tejedora de Coronas" (The weaver of crowns) and 40 other works
- Isidoro Galán, Jesuit and trade unionist.
- José María García de Toledo, politician, early "juntismo" movement member, later independentist; President of the Supreme Junta of Cartagena (1810–11)
- Laura González, Miss Colombia 2017
- Enrique Grau, painter, born in Panama but raised in the city where most of his work was done and inspired
- Dilson Herrera, professional baseball player
- Zharick León, actress
- Nereo Lopez, documentary photographer
- Manuel Medrano, singer
- Andrea Nocetti, Miss Colombia 2001
- Rafael Núñez, politician, journalist, diplomat, writer, lawyer, and judge. Dominant political figure in Colombia in the 19th century, and the first to do so by civil means: In 1848, just after another civil war entered local politics. Then became MP for Cartagena in the Colombian Congress, was also Governor of Bolívar (1854), and then briefly Minister of War in 1855–57. President of the Sovereign State of Bolivar twice (1876–77) and (1879–80) was finally elected 4 times President of Colombia. During this time, the country stabilized, and the economy grew after decades of civil war. He established the foundations for civil-led government with the Colombian Constitution of 1886 that lasted 105 years. Also wrote the country's national anthem.
- Laura Olascuaga, Miss Universe Colombia 2020
- Alfonso Pérez, boxer
- Carlos Pizarro Leongómez, guerrilla fighter for the 19th of April Movement
- Sabas Pretelt de la Vega, politician and ambassador, Minister of Interior (2003–06)
- Frey Ramos, footballer
- Ramses Ramos, actor
- Hugo Soto, footballer
- Julio Teherán, professional baseball player
- Gio Urshela, professional baseball player
- Rodrigo Valdez, boxer
- Kevin Flórez, singer
- Karoll Márquez, singer
- Jeymmy Vargas, Miss International 2004
- Teresa Román Vélez, writer
- Orlando Cabrera, baseball player
- Jeymmy Vargas, beauty queen and model
- Vanessa Rosales Altamar, author
- Laura De León Céspedes, actress
- Angie Cepeda, actress
- Lorna Cepeda, actress
- Eduardo Lemaitre, historian
- Salomón Bustamante Sanmiguel, TV host
- Patricia Teherán Romero, singer
- Rafael Vergara Navarro, lawyer

== See also ==
- San Basilio de Palenque, according to UNESCO, the first free African town in the Americas, located 50 kilometres (31 mi) from Cartagena de Indias
- Rosario Islands, an archipelago located 20 kilometres from Cartagena with a large coral reef
- List of tallest buildings in Cartagena
- Roman Catholic Archdiocese of Cartagena in Colombia
- Manuel Rodríguez Torices
- Cartagena Manifesto
- United Provinces of New Granada
- Gran Colombia
- War of the Supremes
- 1829–51 cholera pandemic, in which 4000 Cartageneros died in 1849
