= Slavery in Colombia =

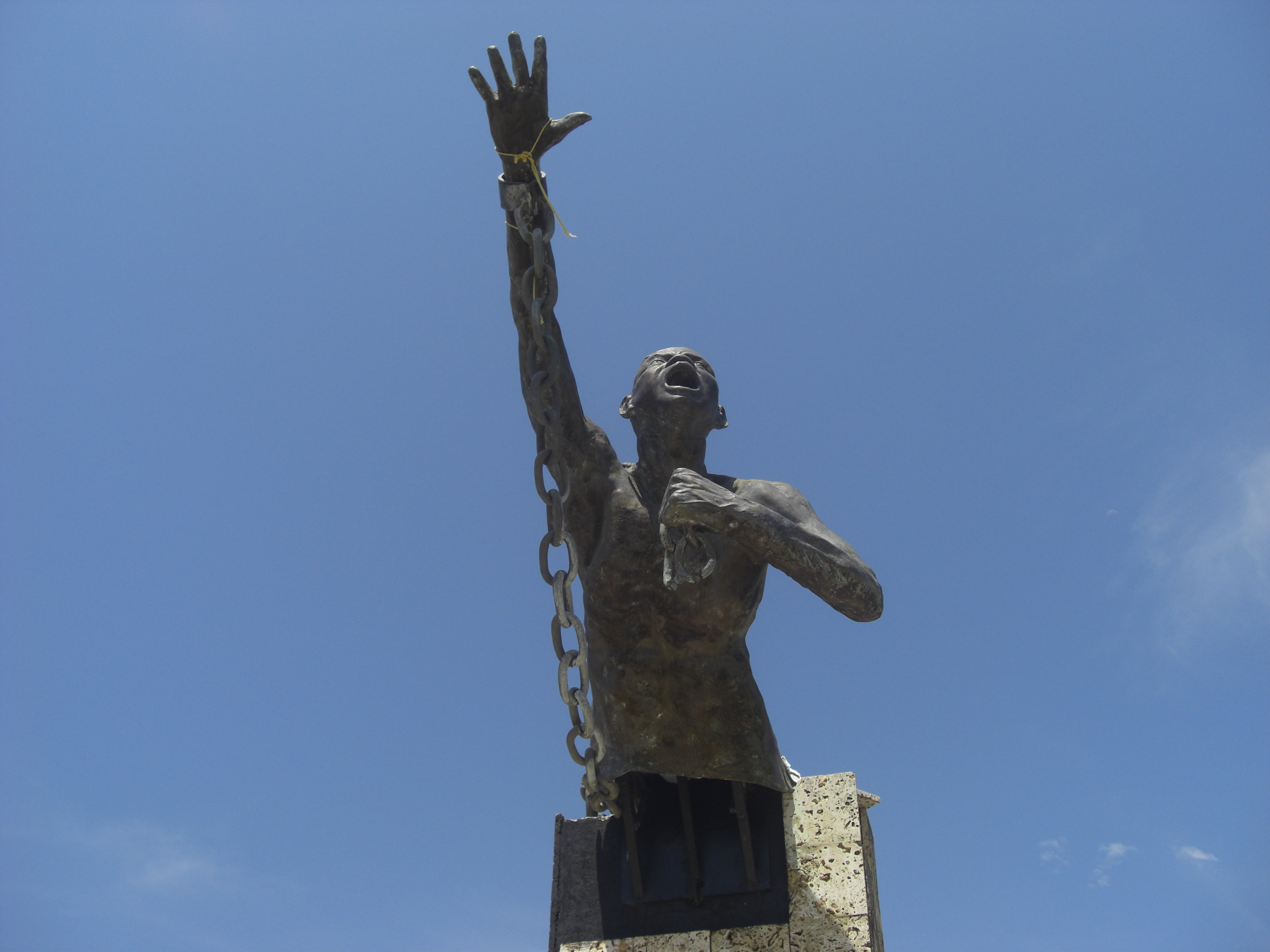
Benkos Bioho, a former African king who was enslaved and managed to escape, forming the village of San Basilio de Palenque.

The practice of slavery in present-day Colombia dates back to the pre-Spanish era and persisted until its definitive abolition in 1851. This practice involved the human trafficking of Indigenous individuals, initially among Indigenous groups such as the Chibchas, the Muzos, or the Panches, and later by European traders, particularly the Portuguese, who brought enslaved Africans, to the region. Subsequently, commercial elites of the early Republic of New Granada, what is present-day Colombia, also participated in this trade.

== Indigenous slavery ==
The historical enslavement of Indigenous peoples in what is now Colombia predated the arrival of the Spanish. It is documented that the Chibchas, the Muzos, and the Panches engaged in enslavement and cannibalism practices. The Spaniards, upon encountering these customs, were appalled and sought to abolish cannibalism and convert the Indigenous peoples to Christianity in an effort to mitigate the brutality and depredation present in the region. As the Spanish conquistadors advanced, Indigenous peoples who opposed and fought against the Viceroyalty of New Granada were subsequently enslaved as prisoners of war, in accordance with Spanish customs. For instance, Gonzalo Jiménez de Quesada distributed captured prisoners among his captains and soldiers. This practice continued without the knowledge or legal justification of the Spanish crown until the issuance of the Laws of Burgos in 1512, which officially abolished the de jure slavery of Indigenous peoples. The legal status of the conquered American population was subject to further regulations outlined in the New Laws of 1542. These laws sought to afford additional protections to these peoples and notably rendered Indigenous slavery entirely illegal.

The enforcement of the New Laws in the Spanish empire led to the execution of numerous colonists who opposed Indigenous slavery and sought to perpetuate it . These laws were instrumental in establishing a robust defense of the Indigenous population.

By 1545, the New Laws repealed the inheritability of encomiendas, weakening encomenderos by dissolving their grant upon their deaths, again allowing the viceroys and governors to establish new encomiendas. The New laws banned the indigenous slavery and this created a shortage of labour to develop the infrastructures.

== African slavery ==
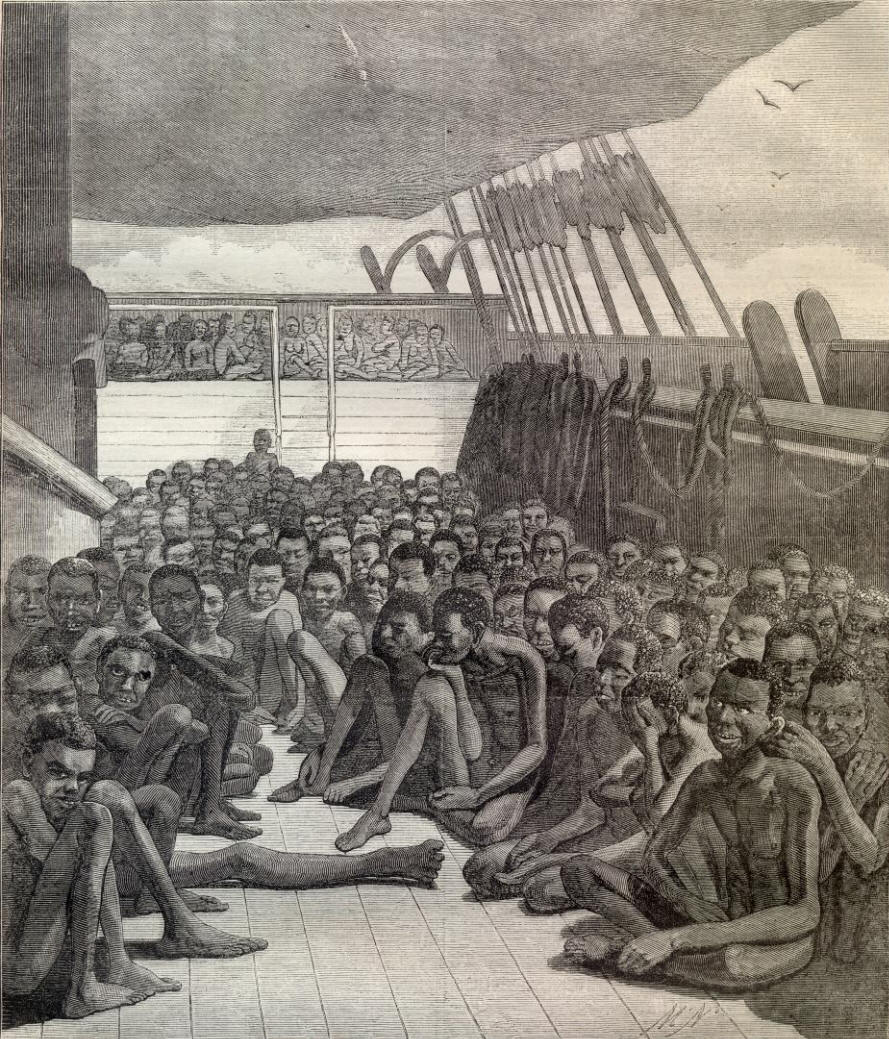
African slaves were overcrowded during their transportation across the Atlantic.

The Iberian slave trade in Africa began with the Portuguese, who transported prisoners to the Madeira Islands and the Azores. Through the Treaty of Alcáçovas, in 1479 the Kingdom of Castile recognized the Portuguese primacy in the African slave trade, which would make them the main providers of enslaved labor for centuries to come. This reached a new dimension with the colonization of the New World, since the native population slavery was banned from slavery by the spanish authorities. Thus, the massive trafficking of African slaves to the provinces that would be the Viceroyalty of New Granada would begin only after the Indigenous slavery was banned with the New Laws, beginning in the second half of the 16th century. This trafficking occurred through licencias, a kind of contract with the state in which the crown authorized the slave trade to the colonies in exchange for a tax contribution.

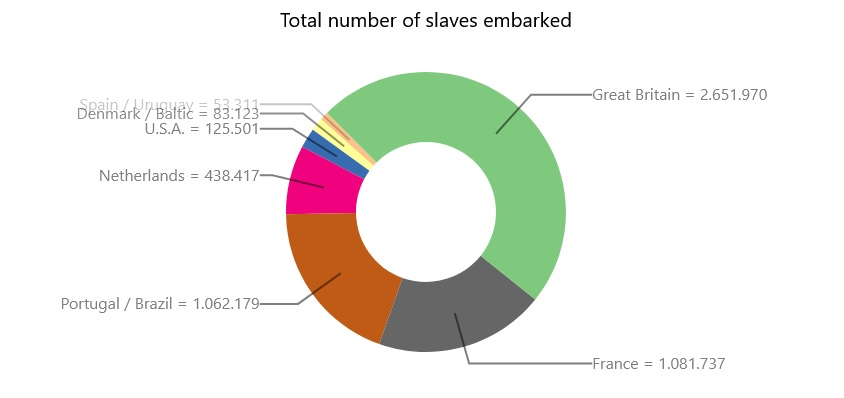
Slaves shipped to America from 1450 to 1800 by country

The countries that controlled the transatlantic slave market in terms of number of slaves shipped were: United Kingdom, Portugal and France.

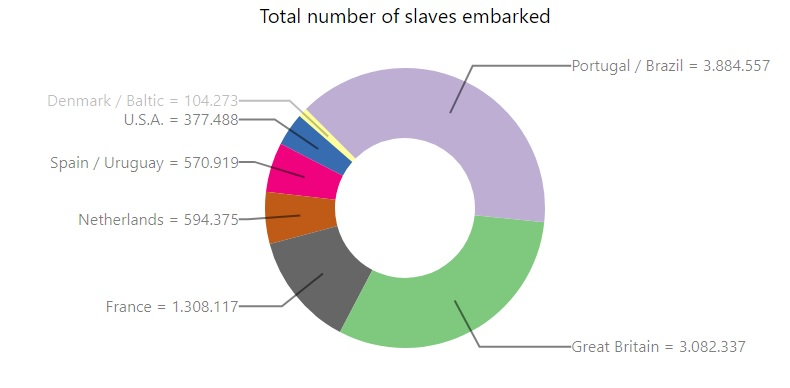
Slaves embarked to America from 1450 until 1866 by country

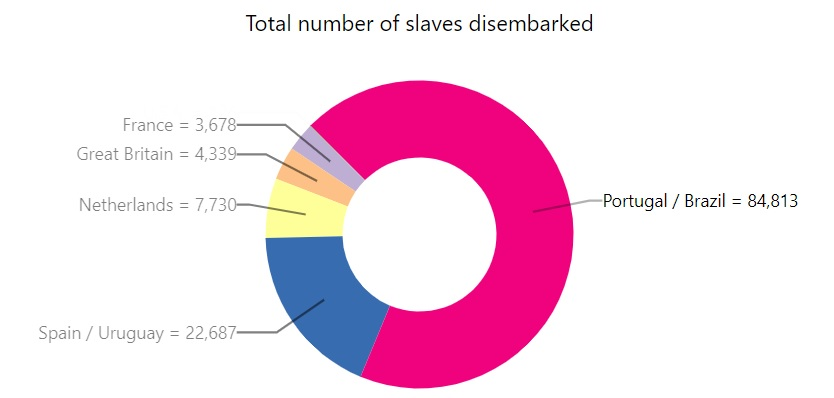
Number of slaves landed in Colombia including Providencia and San Andres by flag of the ship carrying the slaves.

The slave trade was morally justified under the idea that the slave received the "invaluable" evangelizing work of his master, and that the Christian principle of equality referred to equality in the hereafter and the superiority of the white man in the present. This did not prevent slaves from being transported in subhuman conditions; the journey from Africa to America lasted about two months and was carried out on disease-ridden ships, with poor or no ventilation, and in overcrowded conditions.

=== Ethnic origins ===
The first Portuguese conquerors to reach the African coasts had a fairly direct approach to enslaving the natives, relying on war expeditions in which they kidnapped the natives; however the process was cumbersome and difficult, so it was eventually replaced by trading posts, in which manufactured products were exchanged by local leaders in exchange for captured slaves.

The bulk of African slaves arriving in the New World was taken from the West African coasts, understood as the space between the Senegal and Cuanza rivers. Determining the ethnic origin of slaves is complex, since the records of the time come from Europeans interested in identifying the port of origin and not in making any type of ethnographic assessment. Because of this, the various researchers who approach the question of the origins of Afro-Colombian slaves often have no choice but to group their origin into larger regions, often divided into three. Luz Adriana Maya identifies these as: Sudano-Sahelian, the tropical forest and the equatorial rainforest; John Thornton identifies the three regions as: Upper Guinea, Lower Guinea and the Angola region. These regions do not comprise single peoples, and include great diversity among them.

The western Sahel region is home to ethnic groups such as the Fulani, Mande and Songhai. The region was home to the largest empires in Sub-Saharan Africa, the Empire of Ghana, Empire of Mali and Songhai Empire. The latter two would become a direct part of the slave trade and collapse during it. The two later empires would be Muslim, which would influence not only their dominant ethnic groups but other peoples who would arrive in chains at the ports of Cartagena de Indias such as the Balanta, Bijagós, Diola, Nalu and Susu.

In the Gulf of Guinea region, peoples can be divided into two macro-groups, the Kwe peoples and the speakers of Volta-Niger languages. This region was dominated by smaller states like the Ashanti Kingdom as well as the city states of Ife and Benin. It is the origin of peoples such as the Yoruba, Igbo and Ashanti people. This region represents the origin of several Afro-Caribbean religions still practiced in Colombia such as Santeria, which has its origin in the Yoruba religion.

In the southernmost region between the Congo river delta and present-day Angola, the great majority of the peoples were of Bantu origin, mainly Kikongo and Kimbundu speakers. The region included states such as the small Lunda Empire and the great Kingdom of Kongo, whose king Afonso I unsuccessfully attempted to stop the slave trade from his domain by sending correspondence to John III of Portugal speaking of the "corruption and depravity" of European slavers who depopulated their country. He also sent emissaries to deal with the Pope, but these were intercepted by the Portuguese upon landing in Lisbon.

=== On the Caribbean coast ===
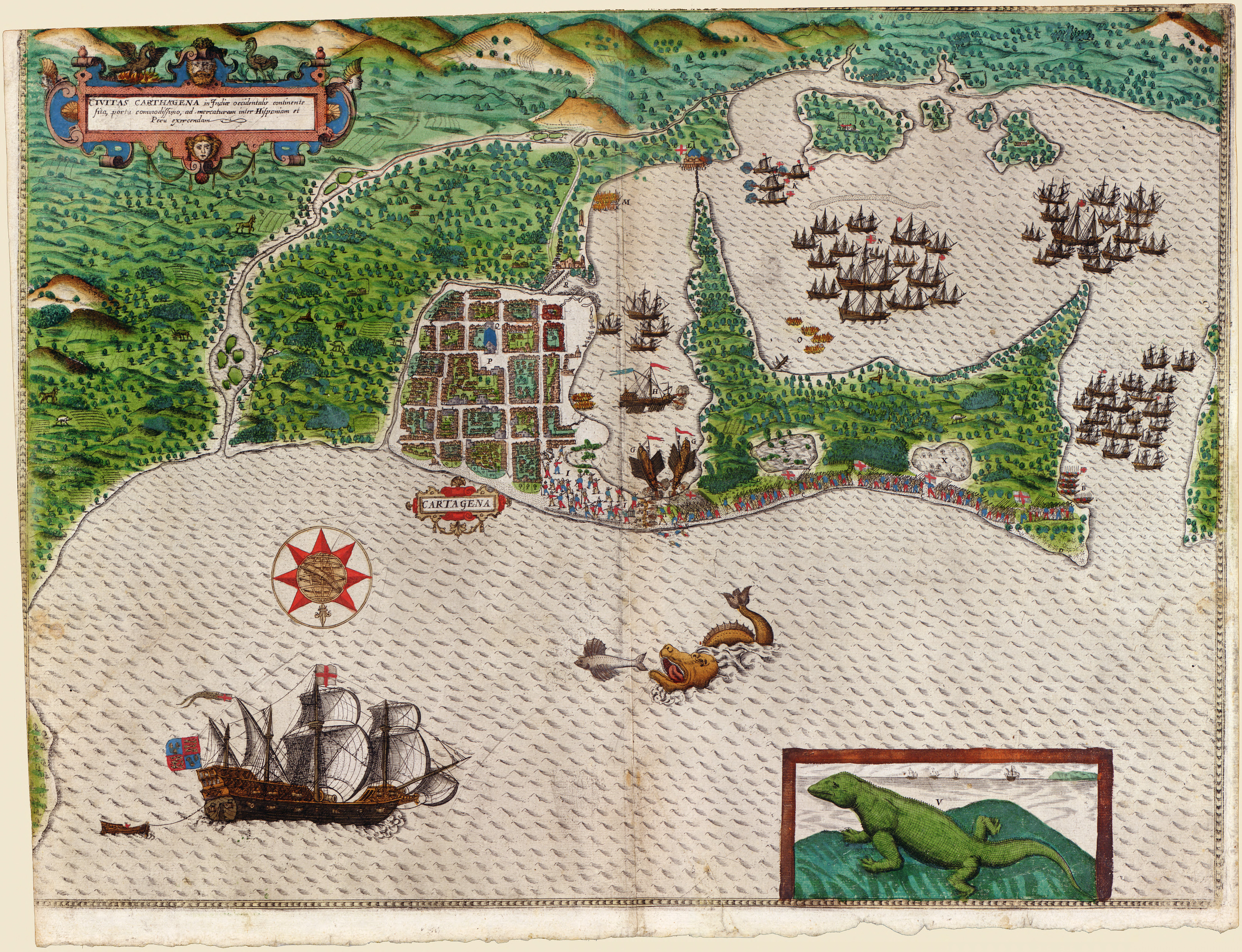
Cartagena de Indias was the main port of entry for slaves during the colony.

Cartagena de Indias was the main port of entry of slaves into the country during the colonial period and during its highest boom it turned out to be the most lucrative business in the city. By 1620 the city had 6,000 inhabitants, of whom 1,400 were slaves of African origin, by 1686 the number of slaves had increased to 2,000. In the census carried out between 1778 and 1780 it was determined that the slave population represented 10% of the population in the Santa Marta Province and 8% in the Cartagena Province.

The use of slave labor in Cartagena Province turned out to be essential for the economy of both urban and rural areas. With the death of the vast majority of the native population, the work of the Africans became highly relevant. Although during the seventeenth century slave labor was used in both agriculture and livestock, eventually it became concentrated around only the latter since agriculture is seasonal and therefore less profitable for the slave owner who wanted to minimize the hours in which the slave did not work.

Inside the cities, slavery gained a function not only of production but of status, all the houses of prosperous Spaniards in Cartagena and Mompós were endowed with black servitude, which served as a sign of opulence. These slaves were traded during the 17th century for a value between 200 and 400 silver pesos each.

The system of production with slave labor required a constant influx of new slaves, since the population of African origin had negative growth rates in the New World. This was due to various factors such as the number of men exceeding that of women by a factor of 5 to 1 because they were considered more productive, as well as the high death rate among workers. This required the constant influx of new "Bozales" slaves (born in Africa).

Slavery in the Cartagena province began to decline in the 18th century. During the republican era the institution entered into a true decline, mainly in rural areas where the current system of production ceased to be replaced by cheap mestizo labor. In urban areas slavery managed to maintain its relevance because it was more linked to the exhibition of status than to modes of production, so it continued to be a relevant system until its abolition in the 19th century.

=== On the Pacific coast ===
The first attempts at mining using slaves of African origin in the Pacific coast of New Granada occurred during the 17th century. However, these attempts were very limited and mostly unsuccessful due to the great difficulties that the Spanish had in subjugating the native populations. Large mining operations, and with them the massive trafficking of African slaves to the west coast, would not begin until the last two decades of the 17th century.

The vast majority of the African slaves that would eventually reach the Pacific entered through the port of Cartagena de Indias; in the Pacific they were marketed for a value of about 300 silver pesos if they were born in Africa, and between 400 and 500 if they were born in the New world. From analysis of documents of the time, it seems that more than half of the slaves who arrived in Chocó were of Kwa origin, mainly from the Akan and Ewe, there were also important minorities of Mandé, Gur speakers and Kru.

The Pacific coast was the colonial area with the highest percentage of slave population in New Granada territory. In the 1778–1780 census it was found that slaves in Chocó constituted 39% of the population, 38% in Iscuandé, 63% in Tumaco, and in Raposo (Modern day Buenaventura), an extraordinary 70%.

These slaves destined for mining production were a vital component in the Pacific Region. Between 1680 and 1700 Popayán was the source of 41% of the gold production in New Granada.

== Rebellions ==
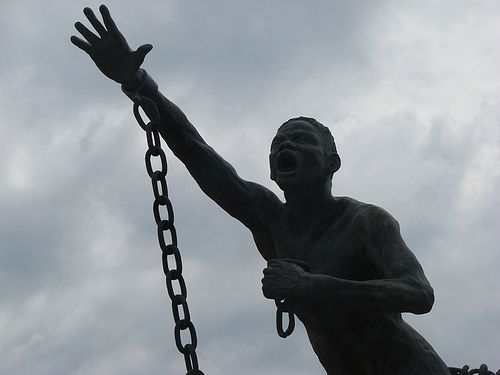
Statue of Benkos Biohó, an Afro-Colombian maroon rebel leader.

=== Indigenous rebellions ===
The first to oppose the imposition of forced labor by Europeans were Indigenous peoples. During the 16th century there were rebellions of the Paeces, Muzos, and Yariguis. The Chinantos rebelled against the town of San Cristóbal, while the Tupes did the same in Santa Marta. However, the Pijaos were the most successful in this regard, managing to stop work in the mines of Cartago and Buga, successfully interrupting communication with Popayán and Peru, and killing the Governor of Popayán Vasco de Quiroga. The war waged during the first decade of the 17th century would end with a victory for the Europeans, who would be rewarded for their service in the form of encomiendas.

=== African rebellions ===
African slaves frequently rebelled against their masters, either through the practice of cimarronaje or through armed rebellion. In Santa Marta in 1530, just five years after the city was built, a slave rebellion destroyed the town. The city would be rebuilt only to suffer a new rebellion in the 1550s.

Although it was certainly possible for an individual slave to flee their masters and go unnoticed among the free black population of a large city, it was a precarious situation in which the fugitive was at constant risk of discovery; therefore it is natural that many acts of flight were organized and directed towards communities of Maroons in which they could find security with those of their own class.

Not all rebellion activities ended in flight, in several cases the threat of revolt was used as a method within collective bargaining. In 1768 in the province of Santa Marta a group of slaves wounded a foreman whom they accused of ill-treatment, when their master sent a couple of white men to subdue them, the slaves killed one of them. Far from being intimidated, the rebels gave their master an ultimatum, if he did not agree to their demands they would burn down the entire estate and escape to live with the "brave Indians." Without further remedy, the master accepted their demands, swearing to forgive them for the revolt, stopping the mistreatment and agreeing that if the slaves were ever sold this should be done collectively so as not to divide the families. The owner also agreed to provide the workers with a good quantity of tobacco and brandy as compensation for the abuses. Similar incidents occurred in Neiva in 1773 and Cúcuta in 1780, in which the slaves had reached a sort of agreement with the Jesuit priests in which their treatment was more similar to that of free peasants in a sharecropping, being granted with remuneration for their crops and with holidays. When a new master refused to uphold what the slaves considered their customary rights, they did not hesitate to go into open rebellion and demand that the colonial government authorities recognize their rights.

On the other hand, it is important to recognize that the resistance strategies of the black women enslaved during the colonial period were aimed at confronting colonial power by resorting to judicial demands.

However, the most famous slave rebellion in New Granada was undoubtedly that of the slaves of San Basilio de Palenque, led by Benkos Biohó. The rebellion was so successful that on August 23, 1691, the king of Spain was forced to issue a certificate ordering the general freedom of the Palenques and their right to land.

At the end of the 17th century, the colonial authorities tried again to start a great campaign against the Maroon Palenques, but despite succeeding in destroying some villages, the entire campaign turned out to be a failure, since the targeted black communities managed to preserve their freedom and simply moved south.

Cimarronaje would continue until the 19th century with the abolition of slavery, after which the former slaves would exercise new forms of resistance seeking to retaliate against their former masters: they would roam the fields, tearing down fences, raiding property, and punishing conservatives with their whips. This period was named by the President José Hilario López as "The democratic frolics."

== Abolition ==
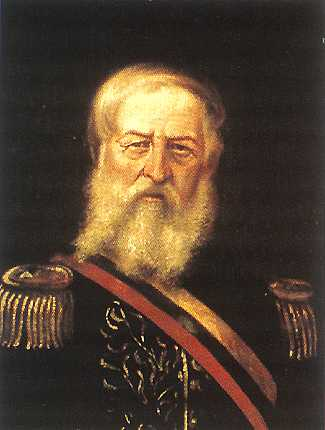
President José Hilario López, who spearheaded the abolition of slavery.

Abolition was a gradual process. Manumission of enslaved individuals occurred throughout the history of the colony, but the abolition of slavery as an institution was not seriously considered until the Napoleonic invasion of Spain, when, beginning in 1809, the question of freedom was raised in the Iberian courts to prevent "slaves from seeking and even achieving it by violent and coercive means". Antonio Villavicencio was a proponent of freedom of wombs, but his views were not heeded by the Spanish crown.

During the war of independence of Colombia, Simón Bolívar introduced in 1816 the idea of granting freedom to slaves who participated in the independence cause. This process was controversial, because the landowners who depended on slaves both for work and social status staunchly opposed the liberation process.

In order to compromise with the demands of the slavers who demanded that their property be respected, José Félix de Restrepo managed to decree in the Congress of Cúcuta the "freedom of wombs", which declared that children born of slaves as of July 21, 1821, would be free. The law also established for the masters the obligation to "Educate, clothe and feed the children [...] but they as a reward will have to compensate the masters of their mothers for the expenses incurred in their upbringing, with their works and services, which they will provide until the age of 18.” The slave trade was definitively prohibited in 1825.

Although the freedom of young slaves should have started on July 21, 1839, the process was largely delayed by the War of the Supremes, which was fought from 1839 to 1842. After the war and under pressure of the masters, a new law of May 29, 1842, extended the dependence on slaves for another 7 years through what was called apprenticeship. In other words, the 18-year-old slaves would be presented to the mayors who should have them serve their former master or someone else who could "educate and instruct" them in a trade or profession. In this way slavery was extended, while those who refused to participate were recruited into the national army.

The inefficiency of the manumission, as well as the corruption of officials and landowners who continued with the slave trade ignoring the law caused great discontent among the so-called Democratic Societies (liberal associations of artisans). This great political upheaval, coming from both the artisans and the slaves themselves, led President José Hilario López to propose absolute freedom. Finally, the Colombian Congress passed a law on May 21, 1851, by means of which the slaves would be free as of January 1, 1852, and the masters would be compensated with bonds.

Even so, in many places the masters refused to let the slaves go in a peaceful way. This led to the Civil War of 1851, which began with an insurrection in Cauca and Pasto headed by the Conservative leaders Manuel Ibáñez and Julio Arboleda with the support of the Ecuadorian government. In Antioquia the rebellion broke out at the hands of conservatives led by Eusebio Berrero. The war would end in four months with the liberal victory and the final liberation of the slaves.

The number of enslaved people declined throughout the republican period until the definitive abolition of the institution:

| Year | Population (#) | Slaves (#) | Percentage (%) |
|---|---|---|---|
| 1778 | 798,956 | 62,547 | 7.82% |
| 1825 | 1,129,174 | 45,133 | 4.00% |
| 1835 | 1,570 854 | 37,547 | 2.39% |
| 1843 | 1,812,782 | 25,591 | 1.41% |
| 1851 | 2,105,622 | 15,972 | 0.76% |

== See also ==
- Afro-Colombians
- Slavery in Brazil
- Slavery in Canada
- Slavery in Colonial America
- Slavery in Latin America
- Slavery in New Spain
- Slavery in Cartagena

== Bibliography ==
- Restrepo, Vicente (1895). Los Chibchas antes de la conquista española (in Spanish) [The Chibchas before the Spanish conquest] (in Spanish). Bogotá: la Luz. pp. Page 6-40.
- Ruiz Rivera, Julián Bautista (1975). Encomienda y mita en Nueva Granada en el siglo XVII [Encomienda and mita in New Granada in the 17th Century] (in Spanish). Sevilla: Publicaciones de la Escuela de Estudios Hispano-Americanos de Sevilla. ISBN 978-84-00-04176-2.
- Gutiérrez Ramos, Jairo (2007). Los indios de Pasto contra la República (1809-1824) [The Indians of Pasto against the Republic (1809-1824)] (in Spanish). Bogotá D. C: Instituto Colombiano de Antropología e Historia. p. 46. ISBN 978-958-8181-92-9.
- Navarrete, María Cristina (2005). Genesis and development of slavery in Colombia in the 16th and 17th centuries. Universidad del Valle. ISBN 9789586703383.Navarrete, María Cristina (2008). San Basilio de Palenque: memory and tradition – Emergence and vicissitudes of maroon deeds in the Colombian Caribbean. Universidad del Valle. ISBN 978-9587654189.
- Ruiz Rivera, Julián Bautista; Navarro García, Luis (1975). Commendation and myth in New Granada in the 17th century. CSIC Press. ISBN 8400041763.
- Meisel Roca, Adolfo (July 4, 1980). "Slavery, Miscegenation and Haciendas in the Province of Cartagena: 1533–1851". Revista Desarrollo y Sociedad: 229–277. doi:10.13043/dys.4.2. hdl:1992/30345.
- de Friedemann, Nina S. (1974). "The black culture of the Ecuadorian and Colombian coast: a model of ethnic adaptation" (PDF). Colombian Journal of Anthropology. 18: 75–115.
- Granda Gutiérrez, Germán (1988). "The slaves of Chocó. Its African origin (18th century) and its possible linguistic impact on the Spanish of the area" (PDF). Thesaurus: newsletter of the Caro y Cuervo Institute (43): 65–80.
- McFarlane, Anthony (1991). "Cimarrones and Palenques in Colombia: 18th century" (PDF). History and space (14).
- Tovar Pinzón, Hermes (November 1994). "Manumission of slaves in Colombia, 1809–1851, Social, economic and political aspects". Credential History (59).
- Vélez Ocampo, Antonio (2005). Cartago, Pereira, Manizales: historical crossroads. Papiro. pp. War of 1851. ISBN 9588236371. Archived from the original on July 23, 2011.
- Valencia Llano, Alfonso (1998). "General José Hilario López, a liberal civilist". Credential History (98).
- Hochschild, Adam (1999). The Ghost of King Leopold. Boston: Houghton Mifflin. ISBN 978-0-618-00190-3.
- Miguel Angel (March 29, 2012). "Slavery of indigenous and black people in colonial times". Weekly Magazine.
- López, Clara (February 26, 2019). "Objecting the law of the JEP goes against the Constitution". Magazine Week.
