= Palenquero music =

Musical tradition from Columbia

Palenquero music relates to the musical traditions that come from a small community in Colombia called, San Basillo de Palenque. This an area in Northern Colombia where escaped slaves came to during the late 17th century. The cultural space of Palenque de San Basilio encompasses social, medical and religious practices as well as musical and oral traditions, many of which have African roots. In 2005 the UNESCO recognized Palenquero music as a "Masterpiece of the Oral and Intangible Heritage of Humanity" due to its unusual drumming patterns as well as rhythms. Central to the cultural space of Palenque de San Basilio is the Palenquero language, the only creole language in Latin America with a lexical Spanish basis and grammatical characteristics of Bantu languages. The language constitutes a vital factor in reinforcing social cohesion among community members. The musical rhythms and beats found in this area are a significant part of cultural preservation, as well as showcasing African rooted beats as that is where it originates from.

== History ==
San Basilio Palenque, not far from Colombia's prime tourist destination of Cartagena, is the only surviving example of places that once existed throughout the country—communities founded by escaped slaves. It is also the home of what has been described as the only surviving Spanish-based creole language, which had declined in use but seems to be becoming strong again. The community has preserved many African traditions, including language, music, dance, and religious practices, making it a living testament to African heritage in the Americas. Among the most important of these traditions are the drumming practices. The drums are used in religious ceremonies and rituals, often associated with African spiritual practices. The rhythms and music are believed to have spiritual significance and are used to connect with ancestors and deities.

Palenquero music originated from the maroons called, Benkos Bioho, which were a resistance in Africa at the time. The music had served as a way for slaves to unite, while also keeping a strong connection to their roots. Many of Palenquero rhythms originate from the region of Angola using languages such as Kinkogo at the time. During this era, music was a way of keeping people connected and preserving culture.

During the 1900s, musical exchanges were happening all over world, for example Cuba and Africa. This allowed for the introduction and adopotion of rhythms with the marimbula, which is a type of piano. This allowed for the mixture of African beats to mix with the Cuban style beats known as "Sexteto."

== Traditional genres ==
Son Palenquero: This is a popular band that created Palenquero music that combines African style drumming with melodies that come from the Caribbean. This genre became popular in the early 1980s and spread all throughout Colombia.

Lumbalú: a funerary rhythm that uses the pechiche drum, an element reserved for a select few, including the Batata family. This genre of Palenquero has a sadder tone to it. However, people are still encouraged to dance and listen to this music.

Bullerengue: This style of music utilizes high vocal structure, and is typically known for women to listen to, as well as mostly women are known to perform dances with this type of muysic. In history this music was said to be a type of communication and way for women to bond.

== Palenquero instrumentals ==
Palenquero music mainly focuses on the percussions that are used, especially the certain drum styles:

1. Tambor Llamador: it is named this way for its "calling" rhythm it creates. Many people often compare it to a heartbeat, as it creates a steady rhymythic beat.
2. Tambor Alegre: nicknamed the "happy drum." It provides the lead and main rhytyhm of songs. It is often played by hand and creates complex rhythms that creates music many people dance to.
3. Pechiche: A historcially sacred drum. Often used Lumbalu funerals, ceremonies, and even rituals. It creates a sadder, and slower tone. This drum was only played by the "Batata" which are a group combined of the best drummers and musicians during that time

== Modern evolution ==
As Palenquero Music became more popular, many rhythms originating from Colombia combined with local traditions. This resulted in what is known as Champeta, a new Afro-Colombian style that is about 30 years old. It's a mix of Congolese Soukous, Nigerian Highlife, Afrobeat, South African modern pop music, mixed with Afro-Colombian rhythms. Champeta is an important part of the modern Palenquero music and is rooted in African and Afro-Colombian music and is the core of Palenque Records.

== Notable people ==
Paulino Salgado: also known as Batata III, is most well known for his drumming. Born on May 29, 1927, is considered the greatest performer of the San Basilio de Palenque tradition. Salgado is the most significant percussionist of all time as he helped globalize Palenquero music as it is today.

Sexteto Tabalá: A band based in San Basilio de Palenque, Colombia, that utilizes a mix of Cuban influences, Cumbia, and Palenque music. Their style is very unique as they use an instrument called a marímbula, which is an African instrument that Cubans brought to Colombia.
