= Kombilesa Mí =

Colombian band

- Origin: San Basilio de Palenque, Colombia
- Genres: Palenquero folk rap
- Years active: 2011–present

Kombilesa Mí (Palenquero for "my friends") are a Colombian band, founded in San Basilio de Palenque in 2011. Kombilesa Mí created and predominantly perform in the genre of "Palenquero folk rap" (Palenquero: Rap folklórico palenkero, or RFP), which is a blend of hip-hop and traditional music from San Basilio de Palenque. Kombilesa Mí have released three studio albums, and have toured in Colombia and the United States.

== History ==
Kombilesa Mí formed in July 2011 in San Basilio de Palenque, in the Colombian department of Bolívar. Andris Padilla (a.k.a. Afroneto), director of the band, wanted to combine hip-hop music with the traditional rhythms and musical culture of Palenque, a goal that he discussed with elders including Rafael Cassiani of the Sexteto Tabalá. An open call was put out, and the band was formed following a meeting at the Casa de la Cultura in Palenque. The name "Kombilesa Mí" is Palenquero for "my friends". Several of the members had been in other hip-hop groups including Monasito Ku Rap, Biko Prieto, Moná Ku Talento, and Rap Ku Suto.

In 2016, Kombilesa Mí released their debut album Así es Palenque. The music magazine Shock included the album on its list of the best Colombian albums of 2016. Kombilesa Mí released their second album Esa Palenkera in 2019. They toured the US in 2018 and 2022, the latter after playing a Tiny Desk Concert the same year. In 2025, Kombilesa Mí released their third album Asina Gué, whose title is Palenquero for "that's how it is".

== Musical style and themes ==
Kombilesa Mí make music in the genre of "Palenquero folk rap" (Palenquero: Rap folklórico palenkero, or RFP), a term that was coined by members of the band to describe their blend of hip-hop and traditional music from San Basilio de Palenque. The members of Kombilesa Mí rap in Spanish and Palenquero, accompanied by marímbula, maracas, and traditional drums including the llamador, tambor alegre, and metal tamboras they made themselves.

Afroneto told El Universal that "the inspiration for our music comes from everyday life...we try to narrate this cultural heritage and what happens every day in the community of Palenque: happenings, celebrations, events, victories." Themes of their songs include language and tradition, local figures like Kid Pambelé, and experiences of racism.

== Albums ==
- Así es Palenque (2016)
- Esa Palenkera (2019)
- Asina Gué (2025)
