= Reina Wiwa =

Enslaved African and maroon leader

- Born: Bijagós Islands
- Occupation: Maroon leader
- Spouse: Benkos Biohó
- Children: 2, Orika Biohó and Sandro Biohó

Reina Wiwa was an enslaved African in Cartagena, who became a maroon leader and semi-legendary founder of San Basilio de Palenque, the first free African town in the Americas. She was married to King Benkos Biohó.

== Biography ==
Wiwa was born on the Bijagós Islands towards the end of the 16th century, but her exact date of birth is unknown. She belonged the Bijago ethnic group, a matrilocal and matrilineal society known for their military strategy.

Wiwa was married to Benkos Biohó, a Mandinka leader. Along with their two children Orika and Sandro, Wiwa and Benkos were captured by the Portuguese slave trader Pedro Gomes Reinel [pt], were sold to Juan Palacios, and then were transported to Cartagena as slaves. In Cartagena, in 1596 they were sold to the Spaniard Alonso del Campo.

Wiwa managed to escape from slavery with ten other enslaved people and they founded San Basilio de Palenque. Although the exact year is unknown, according to mythical-historical accounts Palenque was founded in 1603. Benkos declared himself King and Wiwa was crowned Queen. With her husband, Wiwa created an army of liberated people (including bozales, people born in Africa, and creoles, people of African heritage born in the New World). They commanded the maroons against Spanish ambushes in 1605, 1613 and 1619.

Wiwa was personally knowledgeable about hair braiding as a strategy to demarcate terrain and carry out escape strategies, drawing a geographical map women's hairstyles so that escaping slaves could find and join the maroon community. Seeds from plantations were also smuggled out among the braided hair to feed the growing population of San Basilio de Palenque.

The Spanish arrived at terms with Biohó, but later they captured him, accused him of plotting against the Spanish, and had him hanged in 1621. Wiwa's date of death is unknown.

In 1713, Wiwa and Benkos were posthumously recognised as rulers by the Spanish Crown. San Basilio de Palenque was declared Masterpieces of the Oral and Intangible Heritage of Humanity by UNESCO in 2005.
