= Richard Cross (photojournalist) =

American photojournalist (1950-1983)

- Born: 1 April 1950; Kansas City, Missouri, U.S.
- Died: June 21, 1983 (aged 33); On assignment near Nicaraguan border, Honduras
- Education: Northwestern University (B.A. Journalism, 1972); Temple University (graduate studies in visual anthropology)
- Occupation: Photojournalist · Visual anthropologist
- Years active: 1972–1983
- Employer(s): Daily Globe; U.S. Peace Corps; freelance to Newsweek, U.S. News & World Report, AP
- Known for: Documenting liberation wars & refugee crises in Central America and Afro‑Colombian Palenque community
- Notable work: Ma Ngombe: guerreros y ganaderos en Palenque (1979); Maasai Solutions (1981); Nicaragua: la guerra de liberación (1982)
- Awards: Pulitzer Prize nomination (Nicaragua photo coverage)

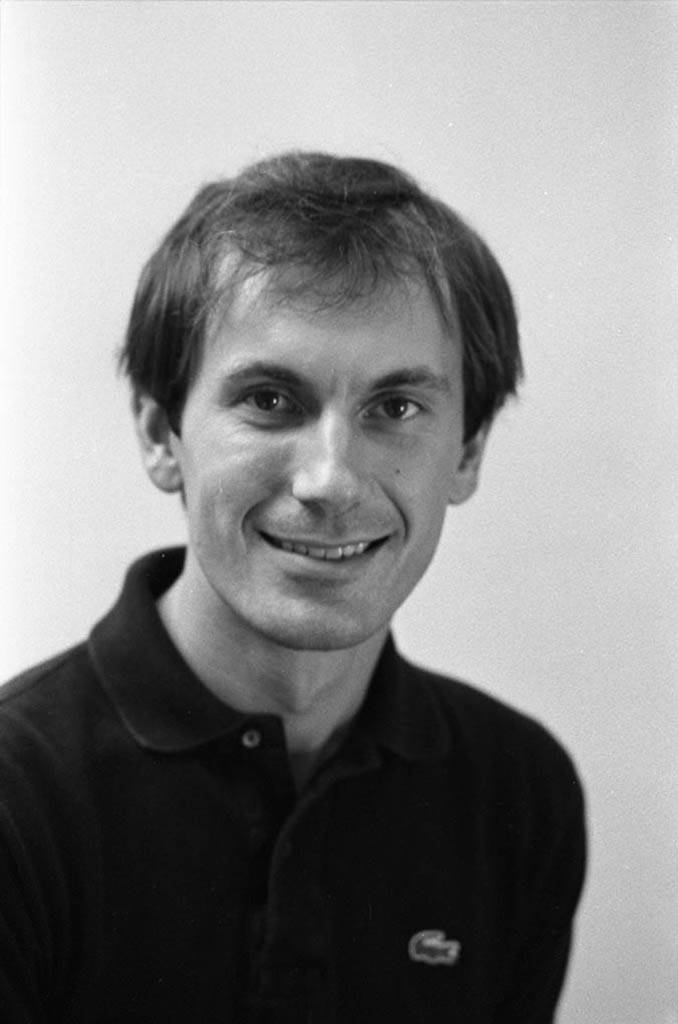
Portrait of Richard Cross for his press pass, Nicaragua, 1979

Richard Cross (1950–1983) was a Pulitzer Prize-nominated American photojournalist who worked in Colombia, Mexico, Tanzania, and the Central American countries of Nicaragua, El Salvador, Honduras, and Guatemala.

== Early life and education ==
Cross was born on April 1, 1950, in Kansas City, Missouri, the son of Russell and Francoise Cross. He attended Northwestern University from 1968-1972 and graduated with a degree in journalism. His interest in photography was inspired by the sociologist Howard S. Becker, who helped Cross learn how photography could be a research method, a sociological tool, and an art form. While at Northwestern he worked as the photo editor of the student newspaper as well as the director of the photographic laboratory. He also worked for six months as a medical photographer in the surgical department of Saint Francis Hospital of Evanston.

== Career ==
After college he worked for one year as a photographer at the Daily Globe in Worthington, Minnesota, and then spent four years as a Peace Corps worker in Colombia as an audio-visual consultant and photographer. While in Colombia he began to collaborate with anthropologist Nina de Friedemann on a project researching Afro-Colombians in Palenque de San Basilio, one of the first communities of former slaves in the Americas. Friedemann and Cross co-wrote a book based on their research entitled Ma Ngombe: guerreros y ganaderos en Palenque, published in 1979, which included over 250 of Cross's photographs. In 1979 Cross left Colombia to begin documenting the civil wars in the Central American countries of Nicaragua, Honduras, El Salvador, and Guatemala. He also documented refugees from Central America who had fled into Mexico. He sold his photographs to a variety of magazines, newspapers, and news outlets including Newsweek and the Associated Press. Cross co-authored a book in 1982 with Nicaraguan priest and poet Ernesto Cardenal entitled Nicaragua: la guerra de liberación, which included dozens of his photographs. He was nominated by the Associated Press for a Pulitzer Prize for his photojournalism work in Nicaragua.

Cross enrolled in a graduate program in visual anthropology at Temple University, and in 1980 he and fellow graduate student Peter Biella took thousands of photographs of the Ilparayuko Maasai people in Tanzania for an ethnographic film, entitled Maasai Solutions. The next year Cross and Biella co-authored a book entitled Maasai Solutions: A Film About East African Dispute and Settlement.

== Philosophy ==
Anthropologist Richard Charen, Cross's advisor at Temple University, wrote about his motivations for photojournalism and his philosophy of working as a professional photographer:

[Richard Cross's] interest in visual anthropology was motivated on two accounts. First, he expressed a keen curiosity for learning more about how photographs "worked" as a communicative medium--not simply as a technical process involving optics, grain structure, chemicals, or even in aesthetic terms--but more importantly, in cognitive, social, political, economic, and cultural contexts. As a young thinking photojournalist, Richard was not satisfied with merely getting the "right" picture--an image that conformed to an often unarticulated set of editorial decisions, sometimes aesthetic, sometimes political, as imposed by photo agencies and staffs of popular publications. It became clear that Richard felt a growing sense of responsibility for images he "took from" people and "gave to" the viewing public. The political context of image publications became an increasingly important problem in his practice of photography.

Cross himself wrote about his own motivations for photography:

Photographs cannot end wars, cure maladies, or right social wrongs. They can sometimes, however, arouse emotions and stimulate a human being to thought and to a higher awareness of his own values and potential.

== Death and legacy ==
Cross died on June 21, 1983, when, on assignment with U.S. News and World Report, he and Los Angeles Times journalist Dial Torgerson were in a car struck by a rocket propelled grenade in Honduras. His photographic archive is preserved by the Tom and Ethel Bradley Center in the University Library, Special Collections and Archives at California State University, Northridge.

== Publications ==
- Ma Ngombe: guerreros y ganaderos en Palenque (1979)
- Maasai Solutions: A Film About East African Dispute and Settlement (1981)
- Nicaragua: la guerra de liberación (1982)

== Exhibitions ==
- Richard Cross: Ilparakuyo Masai Photographs. Samuel Paley Library, Temple University. September 19, 1983 – October 19, 1983.
- Two Faces of War. San Diego Crafts Center/Grove Gallery, University of California, San Diego. March 26, 1986 – April 26, 1986.
- Visualizing the People’s History: Richard Cross’s Images of the Central American Liberation Wars. Museum of Social Justice. August 15, 2019 – January 12, 2020.
- Richard Cross: Memoria Gráfica. Museo de la Palabra y la Imagen, San Salvador, El Salvador, January 15–May 31, 2020.
- Chajul: Fotografías de Richard Cross durante el Conflicto Armado (Chajul: Photographs during the armed conflict by Richard Cross), Maya Ixil Museum, Chajul, Guatemala, August 2023.
- Mboso ri Apú (The Voices of Water), Historical Museum of Cartagena de Indias, Colombia, May 8, 2025 – July 5, 2025.
