= Slavery in Cartagena =

Slavery in the Americas

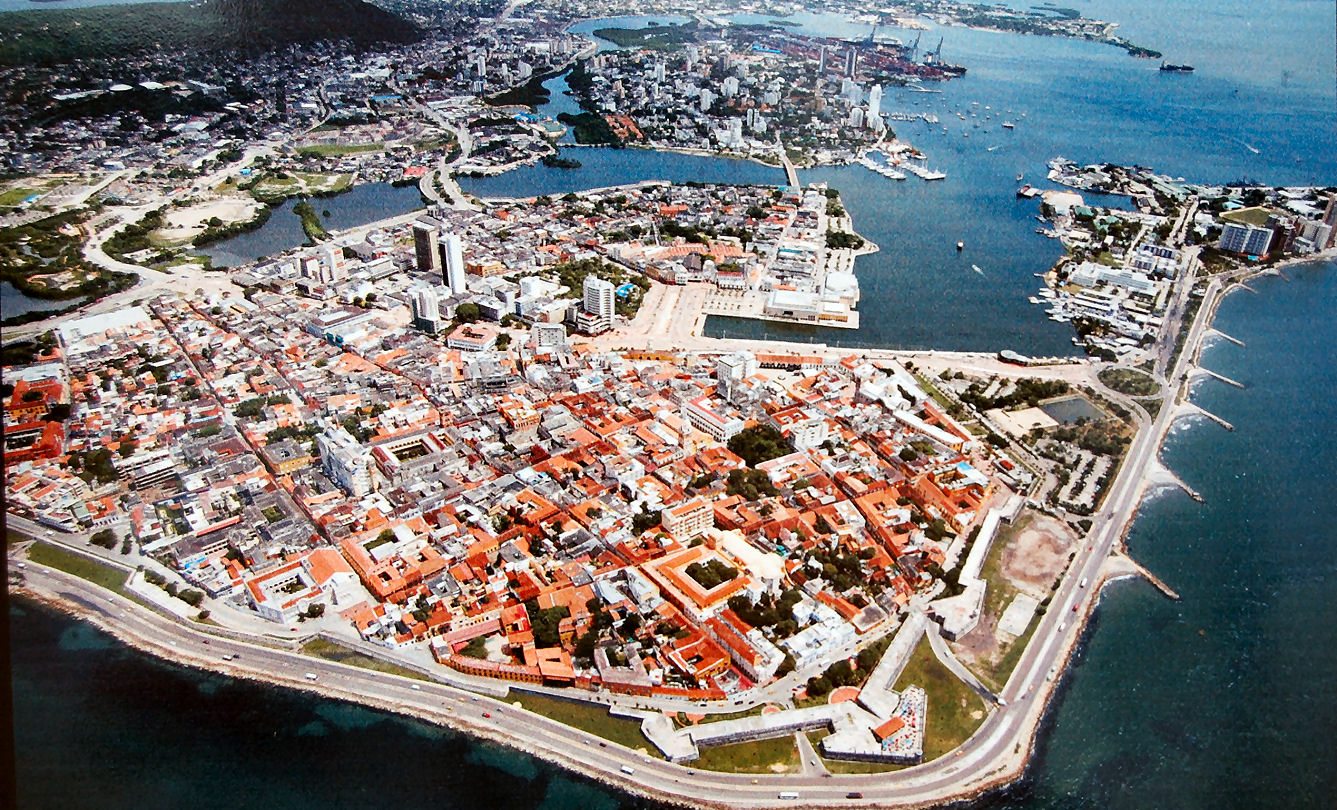
Bird's eye view of modern-day Cartagena, circa 1990s

Cartagena has a long history with slavery that ranges from the 1500s to the early 1800s. It was one of three Spanish ports allowed to take in slave shipments in the Spanish Americas, and was one of the most popular. This led to an economy based on labor of African slaves, as well as a place with rich African heritage and racial discourse, including the Cartagena witch trials and conflicts with neighboring maroon villages. Many ladinos became ship workers, and later these ship workers fought for independence from Spain starting in 1810. After freedom was decreed in 1821 the new government decided on manumissions and freed births to gradually end slavery.

== Cartagena and the Slave Trade ==
Cartagena is a sea port on the coast of modern-day Colombia. It was 1 of 3 ports that the Spanish crown allowed slave ships to travel to as of the year 1615. Of these 3 ports Cartagena was the most easy to access without illness. The lack of ports where slave ships were allowed to land, led to an increase in privateering around the port of Cartagena.

Captured Africans would endure many hardships in Cartagena before being sold. First enslaved Africans would be documented to see if they survived the middle passage. Captains bribed officials so they would get financially compensated for Africans that did not die, as well as avoid paying the taxes associated with using the ports. Many enslaved also ended up being killed by illnesses. These illnesses were often treated in crowded hospitals, such as slave sheds on Santa Clara or Santo Domingo street where they were kept in crowded rooms with poor ventilation.

There was also a push by religious officials to Catholicize the slaves at the ports. This included the Jesuits Sandoval and Claver.

== Labor in Cartagena ==
Of those that were sold to those in and around Cartagena, African descendants had various jobs they could have depending on where they were forced to work, as well as places they could live. Many of those lived in the Getsemani neighborhood. Here are some of the jobs one could have an enslaved member of Cartagena's society, as well as some of the work one could get if one gained their freedom.

The Enslaved

If a person was enslaved there were various jobs they could be assigned in Cartagena. First there were those who worked in a regular plantation (hacienda) setting. Those individuals worked in the fields to harvest plantains, manioc and maize.

Some of the enslaved would be assigned to jobs in the main city. Many of those individuals worked on the ports of Cartagena. Others worked in houses of the nobility. An example of this is the story of Maria Sabina who was seen as a possession by the Cartagena elite due to how pale her skin was.

The Freed

During the time of slavery in Cartagena, many enslaved Africans or African descendants gained their freedom. This freedom was gained in similar ways to those who gained freedom in other countries in Latin America, with persons doing extra work after their labor was done, and using the commission gained from this to buy their own freedom. When the enslaved left slavery, they would stay in social circles of the enslaved. They stayed in the same towns they were in before. This allowed for any information that a freed African gained would be spread through the social circles of the enslaved, including information on the Haitian revolution.

Freed workers could have jobs in the docks. They worked as hands on the docks, members of merchant ship crews, and navy members to stop the privateering in Cartagena’s waters. Black companies defended Cartagena on multiple occasions, notably in 1741 against Vice Admiral Edward Vernon. Other workers were craftsmen and artisans, who owned their own shops. Freed artisans made up a majority of the artisan population of Cartagena. These are two of the most common jobs for a freed person, but there were many other jobs freed men or women could hold, including continuing to work under their previous positions.

== Racial Conflict in Cartagena During Slavery ==
There were many racial conflicts connected to Cartagena. 72.5% of Cartagena´s population was of African descent, as of the year 1777 and the city was an epicenter of politics and social discourse. Here are a few of the racially fueled conflicts Cartagena played a role in during the time of slavery.

The Cartagena Witch Trials

Cartagena was the location of an active Inquisition office. This inquisition would go out and look for practices that went against catholic ideals. Many of these practices had origins in African culture, and included religious practices as well as remedies from African culture. Africans were taken, imprisoned, then questioned until they admitted guilt, with punishments varying depending on the situation.

Some of the enslaved leveraged the inquisition office as a way to leave more dangerous working conditions, which included both areas in Cartagena and far away from it. These men and women would use the words of holy texts to be set free or to be moved under a different owner, since many of the actions they talked about went against the scriptures.

Rebellions in Cartagena

Some would go the route of Catholicism to free themselves from toxic situations, but others looked for a more aggressive approach. Cartagena was one of the many cities involved in African revolts in South America from the 1790s to the early 1800s. It is believed some of these protests may have been caused by news of the Haitian Revolution. During this time period there was a crackdown on communication between Africans in different areas, with Cartagena trying to prevent blacks from different areas entering and exiting the city.

Regardless of attempts to stop communications, Cartagena had a racial plot that was in line with the attacks on haciendas on the coast. Specifically, one group looked to take control of the military compound San Filipe de Barajas, and used the weapon gained from the fortress for creole murders and steel royal valuables. Officials were informed of the potential threat by prada militia leader Manuel Yatruen. Most were arrested before the attacks, but two conspirators were able to start fires in the city.

The Attacks on Maroon settlements

Aside from conflicts with those inside of the racial system, there were also interactions with those who were never completely sold into Cartagena, maroons. Cartagena was surrounded by many maroon villages (palenques) surrounding Cartagena, and in the area as a whole. One of the most notable examples that has survived till modern day is San Basilio de Palenque. Palenques were made up of people that would have been sold in Cartagena as slaves, and there was conflict between Cartagena and surrounding palenques, or maroon settlements. In response to this conflict, and after negotiation, the Spanish government released a decree in 1691 that called for a ceasefire. This decree was ignored by those in charge, which led to capturing of members of various palenques in the area, ranging from Matuadres Palenque and ending with palenques in the Maria mountains. Those taken were brought into Cartagena, arrested and some were resold into slavery.

== The Revolution and Emancipation ==
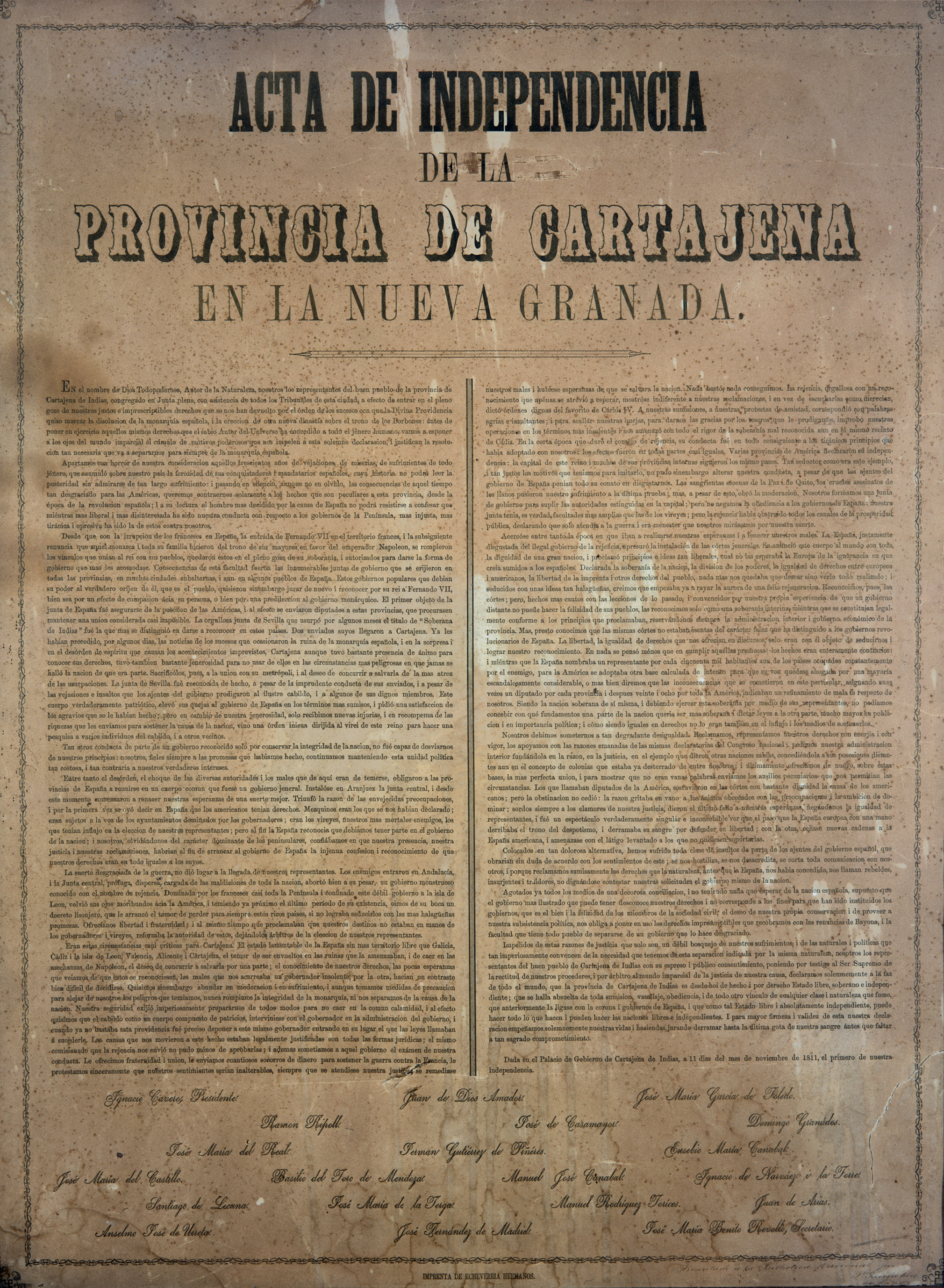
A copy of Cartagena's Act of Independence

In the time leading up to Colombia’s War of Independence, there were discussions over who the population of African descendants would support in the war. Later, a majority of people of color ended up siding with the colonial powers. This was after the move to make equality a core quality of the revolution between 1810 and 1820. This led to black military men helping to win battles, and army commanders tying patriotism to the fight to end slavery. The Cartagena Constitution was amended to stop the sale of the enslaved, and the new countries constitution in 1821 began the process of ending slavery with manumission and free births.

== Legacies of Slavery in Cartagena ==
After the process of manumissions and free births ended slavery, there were still lingering effects after. The main effect was a fear of the newly freed population. Many of the Higher Ups fought to keep control of the black population, fearing a Haitian revolution. Race war debates existed in 1814 and 1828 and 1831.

Some groups played into this fear. An example of this is when a Prado was elected Mopox general commander in 1823. As tensions heated up, black protestors used the phrase “In the end you will all be screwed because blood will run like in Saint Domingue" on a board to defend the black commander from white criticism.

There were responses from creoles to prevent a potential race war. Responses included stopping the sharing of information of businesses that discriminated through the Prado papers. There was also imprisonment of those who spoke of racism, with some being murdered or exiled.

In modern times, Cartagena has a connection to slavery through ties with San Bassillo de Palenque’s tourism market.
