= Luis Alberto Moore =

Colombian police officer (born 1959)

Luis Alberto Moore Perea (born September 1, 1959) is a Colombian police officer of the Colombian National Police. On December 7, 2006 became the first Afro-Colombian to reach the grade of brigadier general in the Colombian National Police, and assumed command of the Cali Police Department.

== Early years ==
Born September 1, 1959, in Bogotá, Moore studied medicine in the Pontifical Xavierian University and dropped out after a friend convinced him to join the National Police.

== National Police service ==
In 1975, when he was 17 years old, and without telling his parents, Moore entered the General Santander National Police Academy. By 1977, Moore graduated with the rank of Sub-Lieutenant and was assigned to posts in the Departments of Tolima and Caldas. In 1981, Moore was the first Afro-Colombian to train to become a Mi-17 helicopter pilot in the National Police Aviation, also attending courses in Russia. He graduated and received many decorations for achievements being the most important the one he received for his actions during the Palace of Justice siege in November 1985 when 19th of April Movement guerrillas stormed this government building. He piloted a helicopter that dropped off Special Operations Commandoes on the roof of the building. He also supported air rescue operations piloting a helicopter during the Armero tragedy and numerous combat operations in counterinsurgency against other guerrilla groups; the Revolutionary Armed Forces of Colombia (FARC) and the National Liberation Army (ELN).

In the 1980s, the United States and Colombia started the war on drugs in which Moore participated in numerous illicit crops eradication operations. He later became a helicopter instructor in the General Santander Police Academy.

In 2000, Moore became the first Afro-Colombian to ascend to the rank of Colonel in the history of the National Police and reassigned to the Metropolitan Police of Bogotá. He was later transferred to the Cundinamarca Police Department. Before becoming General, Moore worked in the Colombian Embassy to the United Kingdom in London, he returned to Colombia to assume command of the Cali Police Department. This city currently suffers a wave of violence.

== Personal life ==
Moore is son of José Tomás Moore, a mathematician from the city of Santa Marta and his mother, former governor of the Chocó Department and lawyer Dorila Perea. He has three brothers Jhon (doctor), José (Lawyer) and Fernando (odontologist). He is married to Graciela Diaz with whom he has three children. Melissa, Natalia and Juan Pablo. At this moment Moore is working in Washington DC at the Colombian Embassy as a Diplomatic.
