= Mahates =

Coordinates: 10°14′N 75°11′W

- Municipality and town
- Flag

- Location of the municipality and town of Mahates in the Bolívar Department of Colombia
- Country: Colombia
- Department: Bolívar Department

Population (Census 2018)
  - Total: 26,075
- Time zone: UTC-5 (Colombia Standard Time)
- Climate: Aw

Mahates is a river town and municipality located in the Bolívar Department, northern Colombia. The town of Mahates was founded on April 17, 1533 by Spanish conquistador Pedro de Heredia.

The municipality of Mahates also covers the village of Palenque de San Basilio, inhabited mainly by Afro-Colombians which are direct descendants of African slaves brought by the Spanish during the Colonization of the Americas and have preserved their ancestral traditions. In 2005 the Palenque de San Basilio village was proclaimed Masterpiece of the Oral and Intangible Heritage of Humanity by UNESCO.

== History ==
The town of Mahates was founded in 1533 by Pedro de Heredia after founding Cartagena de Indias. In 1538 was given in encomienda to his son, Antonio de Heredia who transfer the property to Luis Pelo de Águila who finally erected the parish. Due to its rapid increase on population Mahates quickly became a village and political chiefdom of the municipality and First Instance Court until the end of the 19th century.

In 1650 the Canal del Dique was built and Mahates became an obliged pass for commercial routes passing by the area. Through the history of Colombia Mahates has been a division, named as Partition, Cantón, Province, District of Province and Municipality.

In 1860 two-thirds of the village of Mahates were destroyed by a fire when Mahates was part of the Sovereign State of Bolívar, Granadine Confederation and capital of the Province of Mahates, which also included today's municipalities of Calamar and Arjona, then districts.

In 1865 the Province of Mahates is demoted to a lower territorial category, also losing territory. With the construction of the railway between Cartagena de Indias and Calamar in 1894 the transportation of commercial goods over the canal lost importance and Mahates became less strategically important. Later, with the construction of the highway set to pass through the town of Mahates is then deviated 10 km (6.2 mi) away from the town.

== Geography ==
The municipality of Mahates is located in the northern part of the Bolivar Department, bordering with the municipalities of Calamar and Arroyo Hondo to the east, the municipality of Soplaviento to the northeast, San Estanislao to the north, Arjona to the west, María La Baja to the southwest and the municipality of San Juan Nepomuceno covering a total of 466 km^{2} (180 sq mi).

== Demographics ==
=== Ethnic composition ===
The population in the municipality of Mahates is mostly mulattos. In the village of San Basilio de Palenque the majority of its inhabitants are moreno (dark-skinned) Afro-Colombians who still preserve customs and from their African ancestors as well as their creole language, Palenquero.

=== Population ===
Because the municipality has and agricultural economy, the majority of the population lives in the rural area (62.39%) the rest in the urban area (37.61%). In 1985 the population of the municipality totalled 18,831 people. In the 1993 general census, Mahates decreased its population to 18,412 people.

== Government ==
The municipality of Mahates is governed by a popularly elected Mayor and represents the maximum authority of the executive branch of power in the municipality. The mayor is a direct representative of the Governor of Bolívar Department for the municipality. The legislative branch is represented by a popularly elected Municipal Council. The judicial branch is represented by sectional courts, judges and attorneys.

The Major of Mahates's main functions include:

1. Abide and make abide by the Colombian Constitution of 1991, the law, decrees by the government, ordinances and accords with the municipal council.
2. Preserve the public order in accordance with laws and instructions ordered by the President of Colombia.
3. Suppress or fusion municipality entities and dependencies in accordance with respective needs.

== Administrative divisions ==
=== Town of Mahates neighborhoods ===
- 12 October
- 16 May
- 7 August
- Centella
- El Campo
- El Puente
- La Concepcion
- La Guayana
- La Loma
- La Vera
- Remanso de Paz
- Santander

=== Corregimientos ===
- Evitar
- Gamero
- Malagana
- Mandinga
- San Basilio de Palenque
- San Joaquin

=== Veredas ===
- Cruz del Vizo
- La Manga
- Paraiso
- Pava
- Raicero
- Songó
- Todo Sonrisa
