= Guillem Santesmases =

Spanish football coach (born 1996)

Personal information
- Date of birth: 21 January 1996 (age 30)
- Place of birth: Barcelona, Spain

Team information
- Current team: Kalmar (assistant coach)

Managerial career
- Years: Team
- 2018–2019: Ekenäs IF (assistant)
- 2019–2021: Ekenäs IF
- 2022–2023: SJK (assistant)
- 2024–2025: Ilves II
- 2024–2025: Ilves (assistant)
- 2025–: Kalmar (assistant)

Guillem Santesmases (born 21 January 1996) is a Spanish football coach, currently working as an assistant coach of Superettan club Kalmar.

== Career ==
In January 2018, Santesmases moved to Finland and started as an assistant coach of Ekenäs IF (EIF) in second-tier Ykkönen, in a coaching staff of Gabriel Garcia Xatart. In July 2019, he was named the club's head coach. On 22 September 2021, he was dismissed by EIF.

During 2022–2023 seasons, Santesmases worked in the organisation of Veikkausliiga club SJK Seinäjoki, mostly as an assistant to head coach Joaquín Gómez.

On 2 November 2023, Veikkausliiga club Ilves announced the appointment of Santesmases to club's reserve team head coach position, starting in the 2024 season.

On 26 January 2025, Santesmases started as an assistant coach of Swedish club Kalmar, in a coaching staff of Toni Koskela.

== Personal life ==
Santesmases has studied coaching at the University of Catalonia, and has graduated as Master of Education.

== Coaching record ==
Team	Nat	From	To	Record				
Team	Nat	From	To	G	W	D	L	Win %
Ekenäs IF	(Finland)	1 July 2019	22 September 2021	69	28	15	26	40.58
Ilves II	(Finland)	1 January 2024	25 January 2025	26	10	3	13	38.46
Total				95	38	18	39	40.00
