= Afro-Colombians =

Colombian people of African descent

Afro-colombianos
- Proportion of Afro-Colombians in each municipality as of the 2005 Colombian census 72.7% - 100% 45.0% - 72.6% 20.4% - 44.9% 5.8% - 20.3% 0.0% - 5.7% Without data

Total population
- ▲4,944,400 (2018 census) ▲9.34% of the Colombian population c. 7,150,000 (Estimation); ~14.3% of Colombia’s population 14.3%–26% of Colombians (external sources)

Regions with significant populations
- Pacific Region, Caribbean Region and urban areas across the country
- Valle del Cauca: 647,526
- Chocó: 337,696
- Bolívar: 319,396
- Antioquia: 312,112
- Cauca: 245,362

Languages
- Colombian Spanish; Palenquero Creole; San Andrés–Providencia Creole

Religion
- Majority: Catholicism: Minority: Protestantism; Lumbalú; Traditional Religion; Irreligion; Others

Related ethnic groups
- Sub-Saharan Africans: Black Latin Americans; Black Americans; Black Canadians; Black Jamaicans; Others

Afro-Colombians (Spanish: Afrocolombianos), also known as Black Colombians (Spanish: Colombianos Negros), are Colombians who have predominantly or entirely Sub-Saharan African ancestry; they are distinguished by their dark skin. In the national censuses of Colombia, black people are recognized as 3 official groups: the Raizals, the Palenques and other Afro-Colombians.

== History ==
Africans were enslaved by European colonizers in the early 16th century in Colombia. They were from various places across the continent, including: modern-day Congo Republic, DR Congo, Angola, Nigeria, Cameroon, Gambia, Liberia, Guinea, Ghana, Ivory Coast, Guinea-Bissau, Sierra Leone, Senegal, Mali and parts of Togo, and Benin. They were forcibly taken to Colombia to replace the Indigenous population, which was rapidly decreasing due to military campaigns, disease and forced labor.

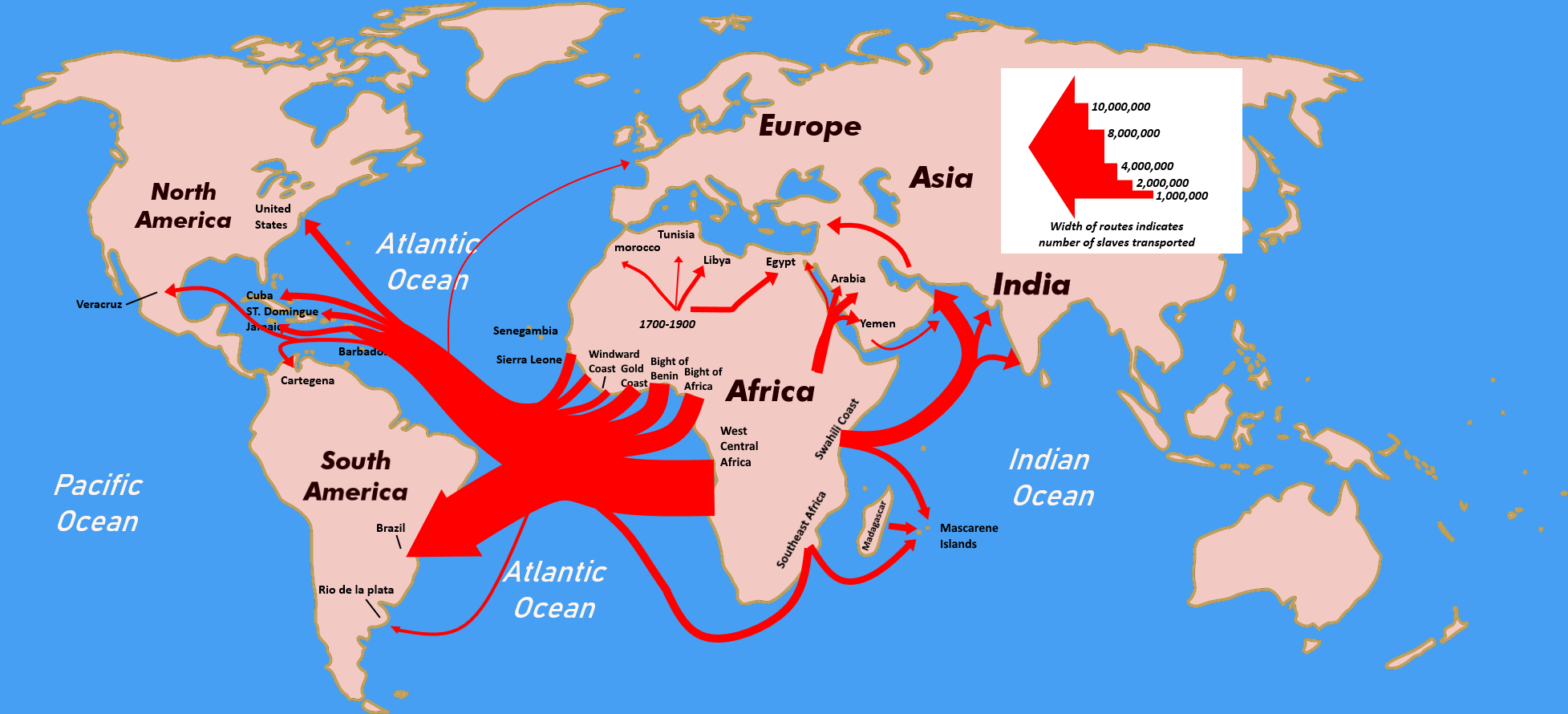
Map of the Trans-Atlantic slave trade. Cartagena was the largest slave port in Colombia.

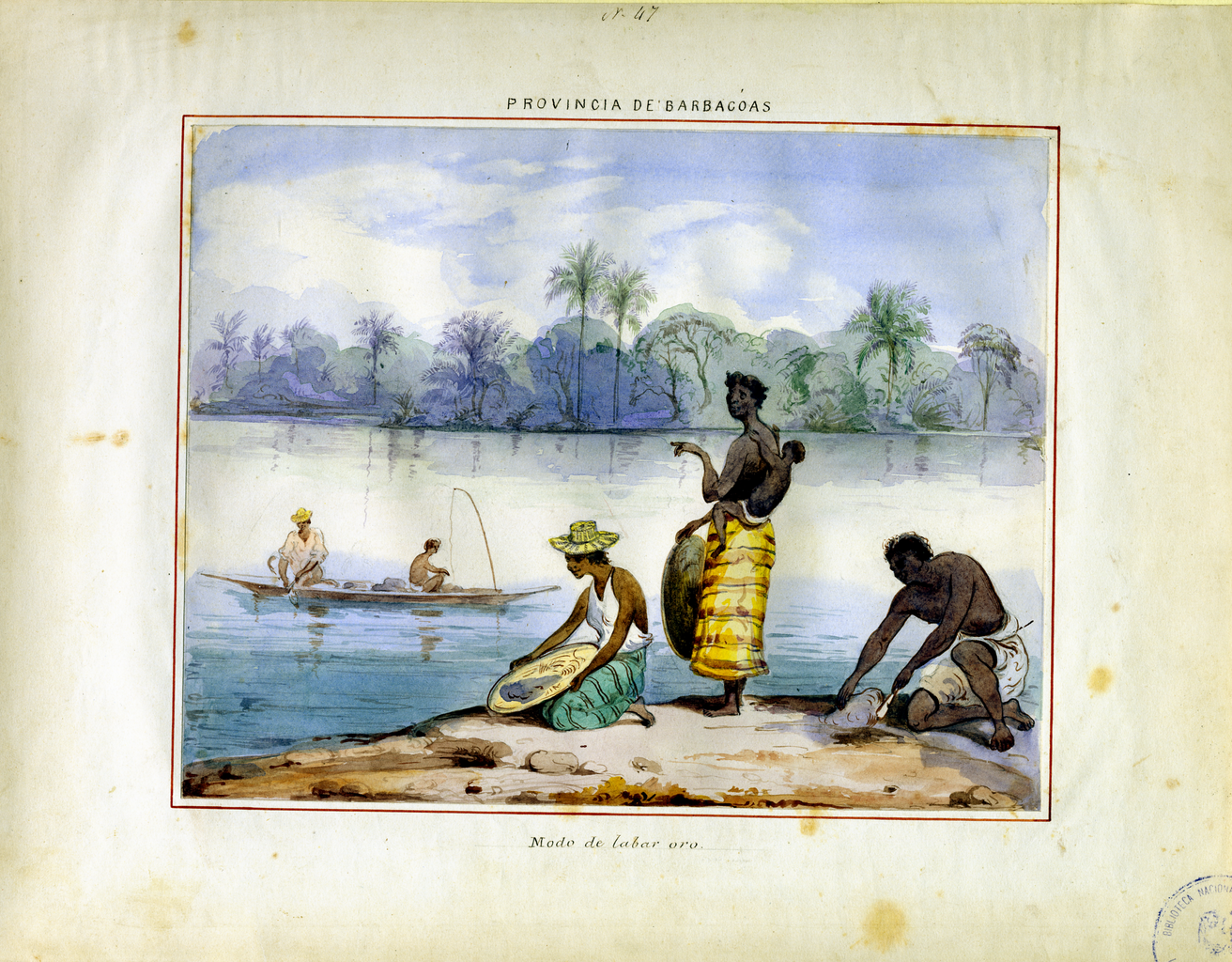
"A Gold-Washing Technique, Province of Barbacoas" by Manuel María Paz (1853).

Enslaved African people were forced to work in gold mines, on sugarcane plantations, cattle ranches, and large haciendas. African slaves pioneered the extraction of alluvial gold deposits and the growing of sugar cane in the areas that are known in modern times as the departments of Chocó, Antioquia, Cauca, Valle del Cauca, and Nariño in western Colombia.

The UNODOC reported 66% of the alluvial gold is illegally mined, with 42% of these illegal activities directly affecting Afro-Colombian communities.

In eastern Colombia, near the cities of Vélez, Cúcuta, Socorro and Tunja, Africans manufactured textiles in commercial mills. Emerald mines outside of Bogotá relied on African labourers. Other sectors of the Colombian economy, like tobacco, cotton, artisanship and domestic work would have been impossible without African labor. In pre-abolition Colombian society, many Afro-Colombian captives fought the Spanish, their colonial forces and their freedom as soon as they arrived in Colombia. Those who escaped from their oppressors would live in free Black African towns called Palenques, where they would live as "Cimarrones", or fugitives. Some historians considered Chocó to be a very big palenque, with a large population of Cimarrones, especially in the areas of the Baudó River. This is where Cimarrón leaders like Benkos Biohó and Barule fought for freedom.

African people played key roles in the struggle for independence from the Spanish Crown. Historians note that three of every five soldiers in Simón Bolívar's army were African. Afro-Colombians were able to participate at all levels of military and political life.

After the revolution, (modern day Colombia and Venezuela) created "The Law of July 21 on Free Womb, Manumission, and Abolition of the Slave trade" in the Cúcuta Congress. This led to the creation of a Free Womb trade that existed until emancipation in 1852.

In 1851, after the abolition of slavery, the plight of Afro-Colombians was very difficult. They were forced to live in the jungles for self-protection. There they learned to have a harmonious relationship with the jungle environment and share the territory with Colombia's indigenous people.

Beginning in 1851, the Colombian State promoted mestizaje or miscegenation. In order to maintain their cultural traditions, many Africans and indigenous peoples went deep into isolated jungles. Afro-Colombians and indigenous people were often targeted by armed groups who wanted to displace them in order to take their land for sugar cane plantations, coffee and banana plantations, mining and wood exploitation. This form of discrimination still occurs today.

In 1945, the department of Chocó was created, the first predominantly African political-administrative division in the country. Chocó provided the possibility of building an African territorial identity and some autonomous decision-making power.

== Demographics ==
Black Colombians 1600-2018
Year	Population	% of Colombia
1600	60,000	8%
1825	50,000	▼3.3%
1852	80,000	▲3.4%
1912	322,499	▲6.36%
1918	351,305	▼6.00%
1993	502,343	▼1.52%
2005	4,311,757	▲10.60%
2018	4,944,400	▲9.34%
Source: Colombian census (Note: The reason for the discrepancy has mainly to do with Afro-Colombians being undercounted in the censuses and/or choosing to identify with a different race.)

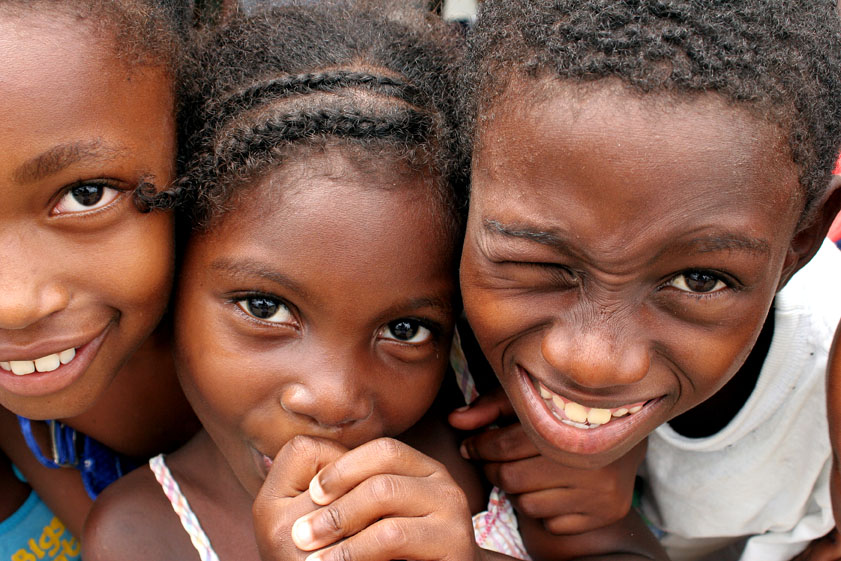
Afro-Colombian children.

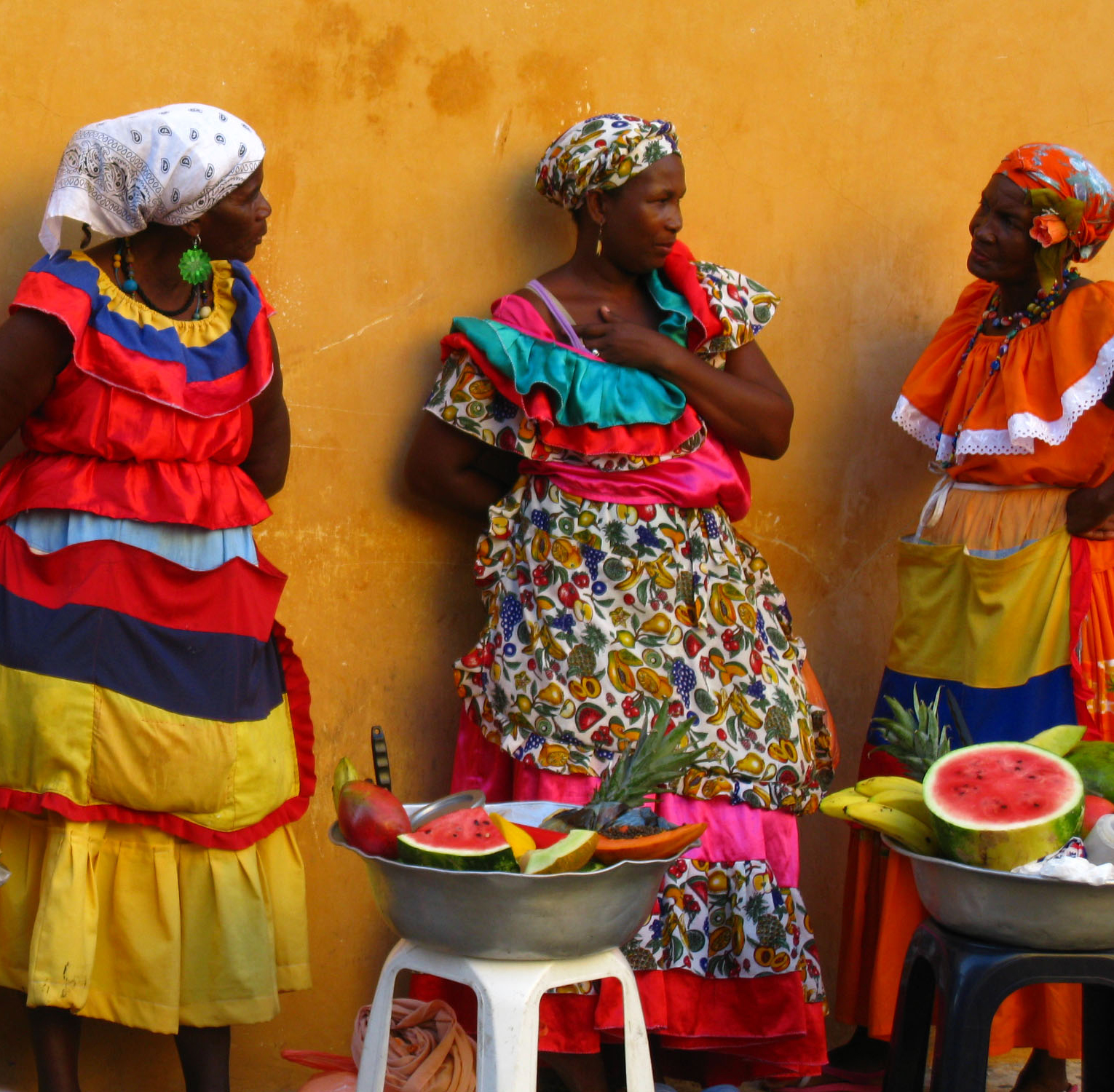
Women making traditional fruit baskets.

In the 1970s, a major influx of Afro-Colombians came to urban areas in search of greater economic and social opportunities for their children which led to an increase in the number of urban poor in the marginal areas of large cities like Cali, Medellín, and Bogotá. Most Afro-Colombians currently live in urban areas. Only around 25%, or 1.2 million people, are based in rural areas, compared to 75%, or 3.7 million people, in urban zones. The Colombian Constitution of 1991 gave them the right to collective ownership of traditional Pacific coastal lands and special cultural development protections. Critics argue that the important legal instrument is not enough to address Afro-Colombians' social and developmental needs completely.

Afro-Colombians are concentrated on the northwest Caribbean coast and the Pacific coast in such departments as Chocó, whose capital, Quibdó, is 95.3% Afro-Colombian, as opposed to just 2.3% mestizo or white. Similar numbers are found in the port cities of Buenaventura and Tumaco, where over 80% of the population is Afro-Colombian. Considerable numbers are also in Cali, Cartagena, and Barranquilla. Colombia has one of the largest afrodescendant populations in Latin America (it is often cited as the second-largest, after Brazi) and has the fourth-largest in the Western Hemisphere, after Brazil, Haiti, and the United States.

It has been estimated that only 4.9 million Afro-Colombians actively recognize their black ancestry, but many other African Colombians fail to do so because of racial relations with white and indigenous Colombians. Afro-Colombians often encounter a noticeable degree of racial discrimination and prejudice, possibly as a sociocultural leftover from colonial times. They have been historically absent from high-level government positions, and many of their long-established settlements around the Pacific coast remain underdeveloped.

In Colombia's ongoing internal conflict, Afro-Colombians are both victims of violence and displacement as well as members of armed factions, such as the FARC and the AUC.

Afro-Colombians have played a role in contributing to the development of certain aspects of Colombian culture. For example, several of Colombia's musical genres, such as Cumbia and Vallenato, have African origins or influences. Some Afro-Colombians have also been successful in sports such as the Olympic weightlifter Óscar Figueroa and the footballer, Patrocinio Bonilla, also known as "Patrón" (believed to have been murdered on August 11, 2020).

=== Raizal people ===
The Raizal ethnic group is an Afro-Caribbean group living in Archipelago of San Andrés, Providencia, and Santa Catalina that speaks San Andrés-Providencia Creole.

=== Top Afro-Colombian urban populations ===
Source: DANE

Colombian cities by Afro population
City	Department	Year	Afro-Colombians	Raizal	Palenquero	City's population	% Afro
Cali	Valle del Cauca	2024	334,182	388	253	2,283,846	15%
Buenaventura	Valle del Cauca	2024	280,882	62	47	324,130	87%
Cartagena de Indias	Bolívar	2024	220,367	576	1,699	1,059,626	21%
San Andrés de Tumaco	Nariño	2024	214,206	74	48	267,010	80%
Quibdó	Chocó	2024	132,121	60	24	144,610	91%
Turbo	Antioquia	2024	88,027	14	3	134,517	65%
Bogotá, D.C.	Bogotá, D.C.	2024	73,960	1,193	245	7,929,539	1%
Barranquilla	Atlántico	2024	69,161	332	845	1,334,509	5%
Medellín	Antioquia	2024	66,054	351	70	2,616,335	3%
Riosucio	Chocó	2024	53,205	5	23	63,383	84%
San Onofre	Sucre	2024	50,915	26	4	57,051	89%
Jamundí	Valle del Cauca	2024	50,681	26	5	181,478	28%
Apartadó	Antioquia	2024	49,207	38	10	131,422	37%
María La Baja	Bolívar	2024	47,481	3	3	50,897	93%

=== Black ethnic groups by population ===
According to the 2018 census, there are the following black ethnic groups:

Black group	Total population	Percentage
Raizal	25,515	0.06%
Palenque	6,637	0.02%
Others	4,671,160	9.26%
Total	4,944,400	9.34%

== Culture ==
=== Music ===
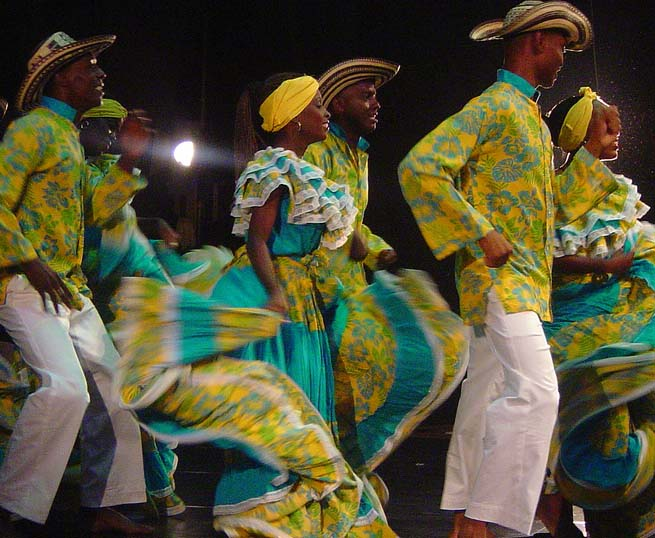
"Fiesta in Palenque" Traditional African Colombian dance from San Basilio de Palenque, a former enclave, now considered by the UNESCO a Masterpieces of the Oral and Intangible Heritage of Humanity.

In Colombia, native songs and musical genres are characterized by an exchange of multiple energetic and progressive musical processes. Notable examples include bambuco, cumbia, and porro, which are examples of typical folkloric musical genres that can be traced to having an African origin, descent, or influence in style.

==== Bambuco ====
The Bambuco has a unique indigenous origin, but is also composed of a multicultural tradition. The Bambuco is established in Colombia's central Andean and Cauca area and is played by string ensembles. The Bambuco combines elements of notations that fluctuate between a 6/8 or 3/4 meter, demonstrating its extreme flexibility. It can be portrayed in different instrumental variants such as the Bambuco fiestero (a faster more playful rhythm) or the contemporary Bambuco.

It is believed that the Bambuco is a musical genre that must have been brought by Africans when the first slaves arrived at Cauca region. There is also a relationship between Bambuco and the name of a town in French Sudan "Bambuk," and it has been theorized that this genre comes from that specific region. Another piece of evidence is the syncopation and other forms of rhythms within the same piece of music. African music utilizes syncopated rhythms just like Bambuco does. Others theorized different appearances of Bambuco in different locations of the country, but all coincide in an African origin or inspiration for the formation of the musical genre. For instance, on the western side of what is now Mali, a century ago, a nation named "Bambouk" existed and potentially the name of bambuco was derived from this nation in Mali. In a country at the horn of Africa in Eritrea, there is a town called Bambuco. In Angola, there is a town called Bambuca and very close to that town there is another one called Cauca. Like mentioned above, the Cauca department is argued to be the place where the Bambuco genre emerged.

A different branch of bambuco emerged in the Pacific Coast of Colombia, the contemporary Bambuco. The pacific coast and the northern coast of Colombia have an Afro-Colombian population that surpasses the average in comparison to any other region in the country (90% and 50%, respectively). In the region of Cauca at the coast and in between the Magdalena River, the most traditional black population is settled. Many slaves came in through the Cauca River or the Magdalena River, if they were to have come from the northern side of the country. On the other hand, the argument that the Bambuco evolved in the Pacific is supported by the biggest population of Afro-Colombians in the country residing in the department of Choco, on the Pacific coast. The Pacific coast is the only place in the country in which the absolute majority is of African descent.

The reasons are its location, the rapid entrance of transportation of boats and slaves during colonization, and emancipation around the year 1815. The act of emancipation led for the Pacific coast to become a refugee zone and to develop into a safer place for slaves from the Choco area as well as those from the interior of the country and other urban sites throughout the country. That allowed for the Afro-Colombian population to grow in this region of the country and therefore develop certain cultural characteristics such musical genres of African descent but are born or popularized in Colombia. Although the Bambuco is not originally from Colombia, it has become a national identity for its multicultural composition. It has since spread from west to north in the country.

==== Cumbia ====
The cumbia is another typical Colombian musical genre that emerged from the African slaves in Colombia. In this case, cumbia is a mixture of rhythms from Afro-Colombians and indigenous native Colombiansto bring about a different style. Unlike the Bambuco, cumbia certainly originated in the northern part of Colombia, and its instrumentation is the key evidence of its origin, as well as its dances.This dance has become the most influential in Latin America. Particular to cumbia, a typical Spanish dress was adapted to available native resources.

It is culturally significant enough to know about cumbia, and there is a concern to preserve it. The main festival that celebrates cumbia is the Festival de la Cumbia in El Banco, Magdalena. To preserve this folkloric rhythm, this genre is celebrated yearly in the Colombian Caribbean region.

==== Champeta ====
Throughout the years, the African heritage in music has evolved from bambuco to porro to cumbia to champeta. Champeta is the more modern rhythm inspired by African culture and music style and is a blend of African and Caribbean rhythms, including the cumbia. The name derives by a form of Bowie knife, which only low income, rural workers, usually people of African descent, would use from their low socioeconomic status. The Bowie knives are used to cut the grass and to keep yards or streets clean, and the musical genre is thus associated with a status and also race.

The genre is native to the northern coastm and experimentation with many new rhythms is common. Therefore, commerce emerged around the varying new rhythms, and more music has become available from Africa. That is another example of the multicultural composition of musical genres from the diaspora throughout Colombia.

== Current issues ==
Ever since Afro-Colombians arrived in Colombia in the first decade of the 16th century, they have been considered a minority group by the Colombian government, which exposes them to discrimination and inequality. Many advocacy groups, including the National Association of Displaced Afro-Colombians (AFRODES) or Chao Racismo, as well as various Afro-Colombian activists, have come together to fight for this ethnic group's rights. However, Afro-Colombians continue to protest for their rights and demand equality between themselves and all other Colombians in certain social aspects. Social issues concerning Afro-Colombians range from socio-economic inequalities to physical violence and other forms of inequality and discrimination in Colombia.

=== Educational disparities ===
There is an acknowledgment of a racist undertone in Colombia. There is a lack of implementing the history of Afro-Colombian culture, language, and overall visibility within Colombian educational hubs. Even so, their history is not told correctly to the Colombian people. It is recorded that the African slaves that entered throughout the 15th to 18th century were not given their freedom by the republic but by their own accord. During religious festivals and other days, slaves were permitted to work for their profit. Then, they would save up their money to buy their freedom. This marked the beginning of Afro-Colombians and their relationship with Colombia. In 2007, the Colombian national government implemented a new section in the government for Afro-Colombians called "la Comisión Intersectorial para el Avance de la Población Afrocolombiana, Palenquera y Raizal." This sector was intended for the advancement of the education of Afro-Colombians. Not only this but the Colombian government had also conducted specialized studies and 18 workshops across the cities of Colombia. Due to this, about 4000 Afro-Colombian community leaders came together to write recommendations to the government by May 2009. However, after many years, none of the strategies have worked and Afro-Colombians still lack the same opportunities as their whiter Colombian counterparts. The Colombian government has tried to help the Afro-Colombian people by creating more programs to further the education of Afro-Colombians past high school. The main program is the "Admisión Especial a Mejores Bachilleres de la Población Negra, Afrocolombiana, Palenquera y Raizal" which gives admission to about 200 Afro-Colombians per semester into the National Colombian University. This program can be compared to affirmative action in the United States, once again highlighting the imbalance of opportunities for Afro-Colombians. The Ministry of Education has attempted to make recommendations on the subject of the background and history of Afro-Colombians when teaching Colombian history. In hopes of incorporating more Afro-Colombian history, the ministry of education plans to add Afro-Colombian history on exams of the state.

=== Socio-economic inequalities ===
Afro-Colombians are a significant portion (almost one quarter) of Colombia's overall population, yet they are one of the poorest ethnic groups of the country. More specifically, studies have shown that three-quarters of the Colombian population that is classified as being "poor" is composed of Afro-Colombians. That is reflected in some of the most basic daily aspects of their lives, such as the average annual salary of Afro-Colombians. While they earn on average 500 dollars a year (or 1.5 million Colombian pesos) people that are from White or Mestizo ethnic groups earn an average of 1500 dollars a year (or 4.5 million Colombian pesos). That means that the average Afro-Colombian earns three times less than the average White or Mestizo Colombian.

That is a result of the inequality present in the Colombian education system. The quality of education afforded to the black population pales in comparison to that of the white/mestizo population. The black population is also not granted the same opportunities when it come to jobs or social advancement. Those factors that contribute to an 80 percent rate of poverty among Afro-Colombians. The World Bank recently reported that the percentage of Afro-Colombians receiinge primary education to be higher than the percentage of primary education received by the rest of Colombians, being 42% versus 32%, respectively. However, many Afro-Colombians cannot to receive any higher education besides primary level education because secondary education (or high school education) is offered to only 62% of Afro-Colombians, compared to 75% of all other Colombians.

Furthermore, researchers have found that the overall educational quality of schools located in Afro-Colombian communities is much lower and poorer than those in other communities, mainly because of the lack of government support and investment in those areas. This was reflected in the results of the ICFES (national standardized) exam, which showed that the average results for Afro-Colombians were significantly lower than the results of the rest of Colombians. Given that only a very few numbers of Afro-Colombians can reach college/university education, the range of jobs for most Afro-Colombians is very limited and obtaining high-level jobs with a good salary is very difficult for them to achieve.

White Colombians in Bogota strengthen already existing racial ladders and reinforce them in urban areas through spatial isolation`placing racism and racial discrimination external to their social worlds. Discrimination based on race and spatial isolation affects the interaction between citizens in urban spaces.

Urban researchers have found drastic economic differences between the residents of Bogota. The suburbs are segregated and more uniform, and people have similar incomes. The stratification has racial and economic elements. Afro-Colombians are segregated and live in all 19 sectors of the city, which are sectors with the two lowest stratum classification such as designations, Bosa, Kennedy, and Ciudad Bolivar. They are very far away from Zona Rosa, a city full of nightlife and entertainment.

=== Statistics on jobs and politics ===
According to a study, between 2002 and 2010, Afro-Colombian legislators proposed 25 bills directly affecting the Afro-Colombian community; only two bills were approved.

Another study done by the National Union School found that 65% of Afro-Colombians in the informal sector and 29% in the formal sector make less than the minimum wage.

=== Example of social inequality ===
Racism in Colombia is so extreme that it can get Afro-Colombians stopped for just looking suspicious. It maximizes whether or not they can places. For instance, Afro-Colombians are prevented from getting into some nightclubs and restaurants. They are denied entrance to certain places where many elites and tourists usually go. People have been moved aside and questioned because of their skin color, but other people can get in without further questioning. Bouncers usually tell them that they are hosting a private party and that invitations are needed to get in. They use this as an excuse to stop them from entering these places.

The television comedy Sábados Felices includes a blackface character.

=== Effects of the war on Afro-Colombians ===
The Colombia's civil war began 1964 and ended in 2017, when a peace treaty between the FARC guerrilla and the government was signed. The long civil war has affected most Colombians, but according to the World Directory of Minorities and Indigenous People (WDMIP), particular communities have been significantly more affected than others. One of them, says WDMIP, is the Afro-Colombian community, which has been strongly impacted by the civil war, mainly because of its vulnerability and lack of protection from the government. For years, FARC sought areas to invade and to gain possession of as many Colombian territories as the gueilla could. Territories that are occupied by minority groups such as indigenous groups and Afro-Colombians are typically the poorest, which causes them to be seen as the easiest areas to invade. Many Afro-Colombian regions have been "attacked" and taken over by the FARC, which has resulted in more than 2 million Afro-Colombians being displaced. Most of them have been forced to migrate towards larger cities (like Bogotá, Cali, or Medellín), which has increased their level of poverty because of the higher cost of living in such urban areas and their exposure to discrimination and violence. Even though those scenarios have become significantly rarer since the peace treaty was signed, the people who were displaced continue to be affected by the situation and struggle to go back to their hometowns.

On another hand, the civil war has made Afro-Colombians victims of violence because their territories, such as El Chocó, have become the combat zone between FARC and the government. More specifically, that means that they have been exposed to bombs, shootings, and deaths much more often than have all other Colombians. That has made many Afro-Colombians become victims of collateral damage and killed from the war, other major reasons for their displacement. According to research by Caracol Radio, one of Colombia's official radio stations, over 25% of Afro-Colombians have left their hometown from violence.

Finally, another conflict that has been generated by the civil war is that of drug trafficking and prostitution. For years, FARC sought to recruit people to get involved with for a low cost. Since many Afro-Colombians are extremely poor, young people from those communities are tempted by those options, which are seen as the only ways to combat poverty. As a result, over 40% of the people in the guerrilla are Afro-Colombians now supporting the conflict and have been manipulated to continue to do so.

=== Health disparities ===
A recent study conducted by the London School of Economics revealed that Afro-Colombians are at an extreme disadvantage in terms of being healthy, compared to the rest of Colombians. Furthermore, the study showed that many socioeconomic factors are involved and contribute to such disparities. For example, Afro-Colombians are much poorer than the rest of Colombians, which is one of the main reasons that the former are disadvantaged in to seeking health care services and being healthy in general. That is supported by the findings that just under 5% of Afro-Colombians have medical insurance, compared to almost 30% of all non-Afro Colombians. Additionally, most Afro-Colombians have been found to live in unsanitary conditions, which increase exposure to a large variety of diseases, as well as a common trend for children to have bad health, often because of uneducated mothers.

Health inequality has negatively affected many minorities in Colombia, particularly those from a very low socioeconomic status such as Afro-Colombians. In comparison with the Indigenous populations in Colombia, Afro-Colombians are at a greater disadvantage when it comes to access to health care. Research from 2003 shows that 53.8% of black people did not have access to health insurance, compared to 37.9% of the indigenous population. Only 10.64% of Afro-Colombians were affiliated to the subsidised regime in comparison with most of the indigenous population. Moreover, 65.8% vs. 74.6% of non-minorities groups characterized their health status as very good and good, and 30.7% vs. 22.7% of indigenous and Afro-Colombians described it as fair and 3.5% vs. 2.8% as poor. That reveals the health disparities among minority groups in Colombia in comparison with the rest of the population.

Researchers have found that adult Afro-Colombians are less likely to be described as being in good health than the rest of the population. Afro-Colombians are also more likely to report that they are sick and deal with chronic issues. They also are less likely to obtain treatment if they are sick. Nevertheless, when they look for medical treatment, they tend to receive it in the same numbers as non-Afro-Colombians. Those results are explained by disadvantages in socioeconomic status, health insurance, or educational level but also by the discrimination that Afro-Colombians experience in their daily lives.

Even when health insurance is given for free, Afro-Colombians are far less likely to be enrolled, which can be explained by structural and internalized discrimination.

== Notable Afro-Colombians ==
- Alejo Durán, vallenato music composer, singer and accordionist
- Alexander Mejía
- Jaafar Jackson, actor and singer
- Yuvelis Morales Blanco, Goldman Prize recipient and environmental activist
- Angelo Balanta
- Cristhian Mosquera
- Danovis Banguero
- Yirleidis Minota
- Deiver Machado
- Dorlan Pabon
- Kelly Caicedo
- Eliécer Espinosa
- Jhon Romero, baseball player
- Ricardo Cardona, boxer
- Ivonne Chacón
- Jaminton Campaz
- Jherson Vergara
- Jhon Mosquera
- Justin Arboleda
- Melissa Gonzalez, hurdler
- Braian Angola, basketball player
- Agustín Julio
- Pedro Bravo
- Aquivaldo Mosquera
- Johan Mojica
- Daniela Caracas
- Prudencio Cardona, boxer
- Andrés Colorado
- Stalin Ortiz, basketball player
- Andres Reyes
- Antonio Cervantes, professional boxer from San Basilio de Palenque
- Carlos Carbonero
- Reiver Sanmartín, baseball player
- David Ferreira
- Manuela Paví
- Diego Valoyes
- Wendy Bonilla
- Eddie Salcedo
- Fernando Velasco, american football player
- Evaristo Márquez, actor
- Romário Roque, basketball player
- Edna Liliana Valencia, journalist
- Hugo Rodallega
- Reynaldo Rodríguez, baseball player
- Francia Márquez, Vice President of Colombia
- Jader Valencia
- María Alejandra López, model and beauty pageant titleholder
- Jhon Córdoba
- Jorelyn Carabalí
- Christian Gonzalez, american football player
- Jeison Murillo
- Jefferson Lerma
- Yerry Mina
- Willer Ditta
- Valerin Loboa
- Omar Jimenez, journalist
- Jonathan Copete
- Jorge Segura
- Jhon Vásquez
- Juan José Nieto Gil, first and only President of the Republic with known Afro-Colombian ancestry
- Luis Antonio Robles Suárez, first Afro-Colombian lawyer and politician
- Joe Arroyo, Salsa singer-songwriter and composer
- Benkos Biohó, founder of San Basilio de Palenque
- Caterine Ibargüen, athlete
- Faustino Asprilla, footballer
- Guillo Zuñiga, baseball player
- Valerie Domínguez, Model and Miss Colombia 2005 winner
- Felipe Pardo
- Frank Fabra
- Adassa, singer and actress
- Éder Álvarez Balanta, footballer
- Vanessa Mendoza, Miss Colombia 2001 winner and fashion model
- Piedad Córdoba, politician
- ChocQuibTown, Afro-Colombian hip-hop group
- Linda Caicedo, footballer
- Juan Cuadrado, footballer
- Laura de la Torre, footballer
- Cristián Zapata, footballer
- Raul Cuero, scientist
- Alfredo Morelos, footballer
- Jackson Martínez, footballer
- Robinson Zapata
- Luis Alberto Moore, police brigadier-general
- Alfonso Múnera Cavadía, diplomat and historian
- Nixon Perea, footballer
- Andrés Perea, American soccer player for Orlando City SC and son of Nixon Perea
- Luis Amaranto Perea, footballer
- Luis Gilberto Murillo, politician
- Manuel Zapata Olivella, writer
- Breidis Prescott, professional boxer
- Julián Quiñones, footballer
- Édgar Rentería, Major League Baseball player
- Freddy Rincón, footballer
- Carlos Sánchez
- Davinson Sánchez, footballer
- María Isabel Urrutia, first Olympic gold medal winner for the country
- Óscar Figueroa, weightlifter
- Carlos Valderrama, footballer
- Jealisse Andrea Tovar Velásquez, Miss Colombia 2015 winner and fashion model
- Valeria Ayos, Miss Universe Colombia 2021 winner
- Paula Marcela Moreno Zapata, politician
- Luis Díaz, footballer
- Adrián Ramos
- Antumi Toasijé, historian and activist
- Rachel Zegler, actress
- Cucho Hernández
- Candelario Obeso, Afro-Colombian author, journalist, engineer
- Duván Zapata, footballer
- Diego Salazar weightlifter and Olympic medalist
- Ilia Calderón, journalist
- Brayan Angulo
- Brayan Moreno
- Carlos Cuesta
- Carlos Llamosa
- Diego Chará
- Laura Victoria Valencia Rentería writer
- Emerson Rodriguez
- Luis Sinisterra
- Victor Ibarbo
- Víctor Montaño
- Wbeymar Angulo
- Yimmi Chará
- Kerwin Vargas
- Brayan Gil
- Jordy Monroy
- Harold Preciado
- Humberto Osorio
- Mauricio Cuero
- Macnelly Torres
- Mikkel Mena Qvist
- Yerson Mosquera
- Didier Moreno
- Orlando Berrío
- Rene Higuita
- Vicente Besuijen
- Wason Rentería
- Wilmar Barrios
- Jhon Lucumí
- Lucho
- Luis Muriel
- Pedro Portocarrero
- Stiven Mendoza
- Mateo Cassierra
- Walter Moreno
- William Tesillo
- Yairo Moreno
- Farid Díaz
- Marlos Moreno
- Miguel Borja
- Sebastian Villa
- Yony González
- Jhon Arias
- Jimmy Valoyes
- Luis Manuel Orejuela
- Yesus Cabrera
- Mauricio Cuero
- Yáser Asprilla
- Wilmar Jordán
- Mary Grueso

== See also ==
- Afro-American peoples of the Americas
- Afro-Latin Americans
- Race and ethnicity in Colombia
- Mestizo Colombians
- White Colombians
- Arab Colombians
- Indigenous peoples in Colombia
