= Eliécer Espinosa =

Colombian footballer (born 1996)

Personal information
- Full name: Eliécer Espinosa Calvo
- Date of birth: 12 March 1996 (age 30)
- Place of birth: Bojayá, Colombia
- Position: Forward

Youth career
- –2017: Envigado

Senior career*
Years	Team	Apps	(Gls)
2015–2017	Envigado	2	(0)
2017–2018	Leones	12	(1)
2018–2019	Klubi 04	4	(2)
2019–2021	TPS	26	(18)
2021	FC Lahti	0	(0)
2021–2022	TPS	16	(0)
2022	Carabobo	13	(2)
2022	Deportivo Lara	13	(1)
2022–2023	Mixco	15	(1)
- * Club domestic league appearances and goals as of 27 November 2022

Eliécer Espinosa Calvo (born 12 March 1996) is a Colombian footballer who currently plays as a forward.

== Career ==
Having begun his career in his native Colombia with Envigado and Leones, Espinosa moved to Finland in 2018 to join Ykkönen club Klubi 04, scoring two goals in the final four matches of the 2018 season. This form earned him a move to TPS. On 4 February 2022 he moved to FC Lahti, departing the club just eighteen days later having only made one appearance, returning to TPS.

At the start of 2022, Espinosa departed Finland, moving to Venezuela to join Carabobo on a contract until the end of 2023. He moved to Venezuelan Primera División rivals Deportivo Lara in June 2022. In November 2022, Espinosa signed for Liga Nacional club Deportivo Mixco.

== Career statistics ==
=== Club ===
As of 26 January 2019.

Club	Season	League			Cup		Other		Total	
Club	Season	Division	Apps	Goals	Apps	Goals	Apps	Goals	Apps	Goals
Envigado	2015	Categoría Primera A	2	0	3 (Note: Appearances in the Copa Colombia)	0	0	0	5	0
Leones	2017	Categoría Primera B	6	1	0	0	0	0	6	1
Leones	2018	Categoría Primera A	6	0	3	0	0	0	9	0
Leones	Total		12	1	0	0	0	0	12	1
Klubi 04	2018	Kakkonen	4	2	0	0	0	0	4	2
TPS	2018	Veikkausliiga	0	0	1 (Note: Appearances in the Finnish Cup)	0	0	0	1	0
Career total			16	3	7	0	0	0	23	3
