= Palenquero =

Spanish-based creole language spoken in Colombia

- Native to: Colombia
- Region: San Basilio de Palenque
- Ethnicity: 6,637 (2018)
- Native speakers: 2,788 (2005)
- Language family: Spanish Creole–Kikongo: Palenquero
- Writing system: Latin (Spanish alphabet)

Official status
- Official language in: The Colombian constitution recognizes minority languages as "official in their territories."

Language codes
- ISO 639-3: pln
- Glottolog: pale1260
- ELP: Palenquero
- Linguasphere: 51-AAC-bc
- Map highlighting Mahates municipality, where Palenque is located

Palenquero (sometimes spelled Palenkero) or Palenque (Palenquero: Lengua) is a Spanish-based creole language spoken in Colombia. It is believed to be a mixture of Kikongo (a language spoken in the present-day Central African countries of Angola, Gabon, the Democratic Republic of the Congo, the Republic of the Congo) and Spanish. However, there is not sufficient evidence to indicate that Palenquero is strictly the result of a two-language contact. It could also have absorbed elements of local indigenous languages.

Palenquero is considered to be the only surviving Spanish-based creole language in Latin America. In 2018 more than 6,600 people spoke this language.

It is primarily spoken in the village of San Basilio de Palenque, which is southeast of Cartagena, and in some neighbourhoods of Barranquilla.

== History ==
The formation of Palenquero is recorded from the 17th century with the dilution of the Spanish language and the increase of maroon activity. Existing records dating from the era of Cartagena’s slave trade allude to the pidgin from which Palenquero evolved. As illustrated in the ethnographic text of De Instauranda Aethiopum Salute (1627), the priest Alonso de Sandoval refers to the ‘corruption of our Spanish language’ commonly spoken amongst African slaves. Palenquero's origins are unclear; it was not referred to in print until 1772.

=== Palenque de San Basilio ===
Palenque de San Basilio or San Basilio de Palenque is the village from which Palenquero originated from and in which it is most commonly spoken in the 21st century.

The village was formed in the early 17th century to the south of Cartagena by fugitive slaves who escaped from surrounding districts, under the leadership of Benkos Biohó. The dissolution of the Spanish language intensified as maroons settled in armed fortified territories. The Palenqueros maintained their physical distance from ethnic Europeans as a form of anti-colonial resistance but they likely intermarried with indigenous women. They developed a creole based mostly on their own African languages and Spanish.

In the early 20th century, residents of this area were noted as having been bilingual in both Palenquero and Spanish. A 1913 document noted that residents of Palenque de San Basilio had a 'guttural dialect that some believe to be the very African language, if not in all its purity at least with some variations'.

=== Decline ===
For almost two decades in the 21st century, Palenquero has been classified as an endangered language. Although it is spoken in parallel with Spanish, the latter has dominated the regular linguistic activity of Palenque de San Basilio. Some 53% of residents are unable to speak Palenquero.

The decline of Palenquero can be traced to the establishment of sugar and banana plantations. Many natives left the village in order to find work either in the Panama Canal or the Department of Magdalena. There they came into contact with other languages. In the 20th century, with the introduction of a standard Spanish educational system, Spanish became the supra regional prescriptive speech, and Palenquero was often criticized and mocked.

Racial discrimination against people of ethnic African descent added to the decline of Palenquero. Some parents did not feel comfortable continuing to teach their children the language.

=== Revitalization ===
With its legacy of cultural resistance, Palenquero has survived since the early 17th century despite the many challenges. In recent years, scholars and activists have encouraged teaching and use of Palenquero, and native speakers are encouraged. Three major events have contributed to the revived interest in the Palenquero creole:

==== Antonio Cervantes ====
Antonio Cervantes, also known as Kid Pambelé, is an internationally recognized boxing champion born in Palenque de San Basilio. After he won the 1972 world Jr. Welterweight championship, local residents took pride in both the village and Palenquero as a language. As result, Palenque de San Basilio attracted interest by many journalists and politicians. It has continued to attract cultural and foreign attention.

==== UNESCO Heritage of Humanity ====
In 2005, Palenque was declared by the United Nations to be a Masterpiece of the Oral and Intangible Heritage of Humanity. The recognition has led to appreciation for Palenquero culture. Films, documentaries and music festivals have brought more attention to the community. These types of cultural programs have successfully appealed to Colombian youth, who otherwise were not interested in Palenquero.

==== Academic Interest ====
Beginning in 1992, the educational system in Palenque de San Basilio started reintroducing Palenquero in the curriculum. Children resumed learning Palenquero, as it was introduced in preschool, and they continued to learn it in advancing grades. Parents and grandparents were encouraged to use the language at home, and classes were opened for adults. A fully equipped cultural centre was constructed to promote the language and culture.

== Grammar ==
Similar to several other creole languages, Palenquero grammar lacks inflectional morphology. Nouns, adjectives, verbs and determiners are almost always invariant.

=== Gender ===
Grammatical gender is non-existent, and adjectives derived from Spanish default to the masculine form: lengua africano ‘African language’.

=== Plurality ===
Plurality is marked with the particle ma. (for example: ma posá is "houses"). This particle is believed to derive from Kikongo, a Bantu language, and is the sole Kikongo-derived inflection present in Palenquero. The younger speakers of Palenquero utilize ma for plurality more so than the speakers that came before them.

This particle is usually dropped with cardinal numbers greater than two: ma ndo baka "two cows" but tresi año "13 years".

Palenquero pronouns
Number	Person	Nominative	Source
Singular	1st	í	uncertain
Singular	1st	yo	yo
Singular	2nd	bo	vos
Singular	3rd	ele	ele
Plural	1st	suto	nosotros
Plural	2nd	utere	ustedes
Plural	2nd	enu (formerly archaic)	African origin
Plural	3rd	ané	Bantu origin

=== Verbs ===
==== Copula ====
Palenquero has four copulas: e, ta, jue, and senda. E roughly corresponds to ser in Spanish and is used for permanent states, and ta is similar to the Spanish estar in that it used for temporary states and locatives. Jue is used as a copula for nouns and senda is only found with predicative nouns and adjectives referring to permanent states.

Examples:

- Bo é mamá mí nu (You are not my mother)
- Mujé mí jue negra i yo jue negro (My wife is black and I am black)
- I tan sendá dotó (I will be a doctor)
- Ese mujé ta ngolo (That woman is fat)

== Vocabulary ==
Some 300 words of African origin have been identified in Palenquero, with many believed to originate in the Kikongo language. A comprehensive list and proposed etymologies are provided in Moñino and Schwegler's "Palenque, Cartagena y Afro-Caribe: historia y lengua" (2002). Many of the words that come from African origin, include plant, animal, insect and landscape names. Another handful of words are believed to originate from Portuguese (for example: mai 'mother'; ten 'has'; ele 'he/she'; bae 'go').

Sample words in Palenque
Palenque	Spanish	English
burú	dinero	money
ngombe	ganado	cattle
ngubá	maní	peanut
posá	casa. Compare posada	house
tambore	tambor	drum
mai	madre. Compare mãe.	mother
bumbilo	basura	garbage
chepa	ropa	clothing
chitiá	hablar	to speak
ngaina	gallina	chicken
tabaco	tabaco	tobacco
hemano	hermano	brother
onde	donde	where
pueta	puerta	door
ngolo	gordo	fat
flo	flor	flower
moná	niño	child
ceddo	cerdo	pig
cateyano	castellano	Spanish
foratero	forastero	outsider
kusa	cosa	thing, stuff
cuagro	barrio	neighborhood

== Sample ==
The Lord's Prayer in Palenquero
Palenquero	Spanish
Tatá suto lo que ta riba cielo, santificaro sendá nombre si, miní a reino sí, asé ño voluntá sí, aí tiela cumo a cielo. Nda suto agué pan ri to ma ría, peddona ma fata suto, asina cumo suto a se peddoná, lo que se fatá suto. Nu rejá sujo caí andí tentación nu, librá suto ri má. Amén.	Padre nuestro que estás en el cielo, santificado sea tu nombre. Venga a nosotros tu Reino. Hágase tu voluntad, así en la tierra como en el cielo. Danos hoy nuestro pan de cada día. perdona nuestras ofensas, como también nosotros perdonamos a los que nos ofenden. no nos dejes caer en la tentación, y líbranos del mal. Amén.

== See also ==
- Bozal Spanish – Extinct Spanish creole
