= Benkos Biohó =

Kongo royal and Colombian slave rebel

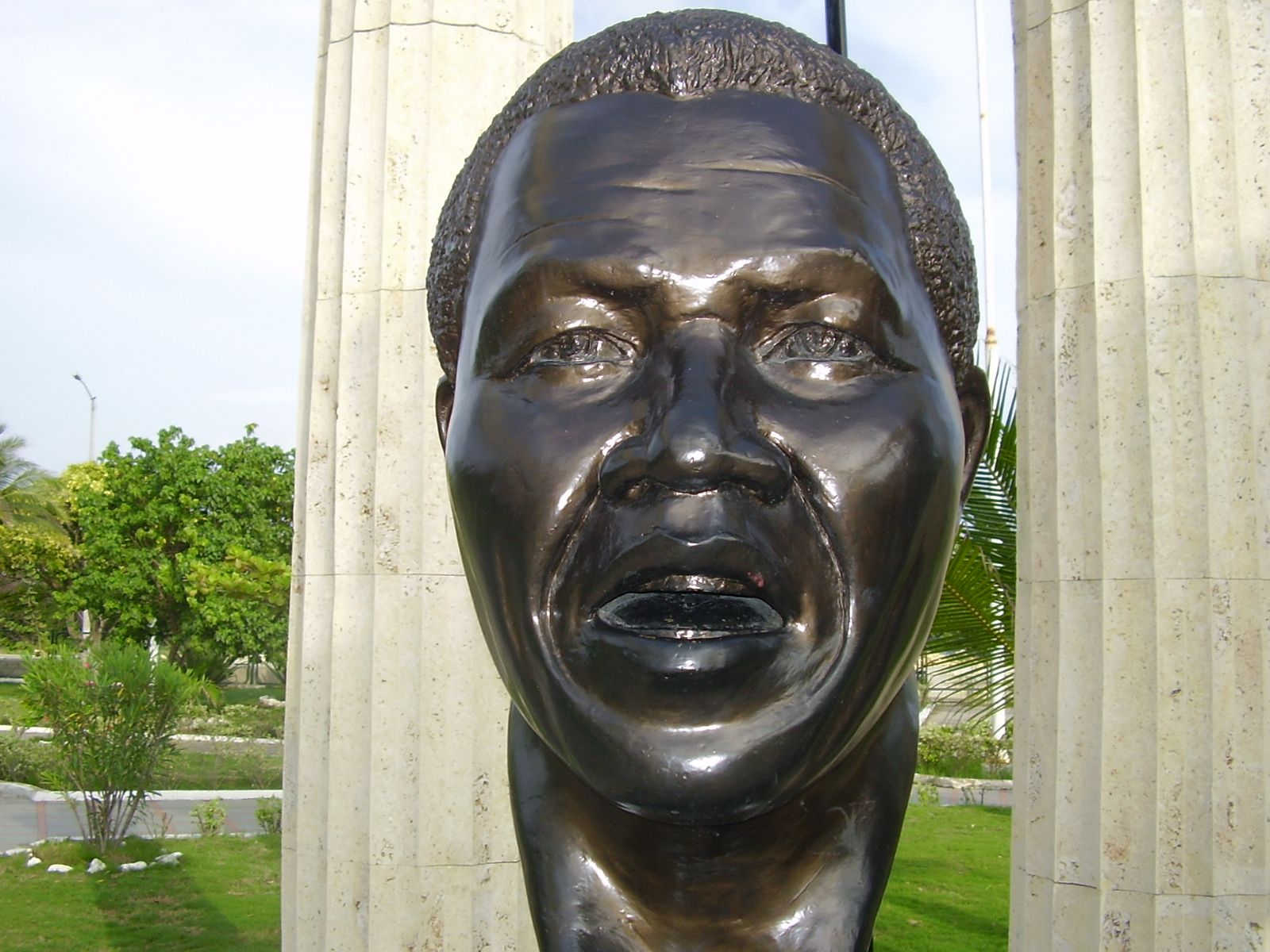
- Statue of Benkos Biohó
- Born: Bissagos Islands, Guinea Bissau
- Died: 16 March 1621; Cartagena, New Kingdom of Granada, Spanish Empire
- Other name: King of Arcabuco

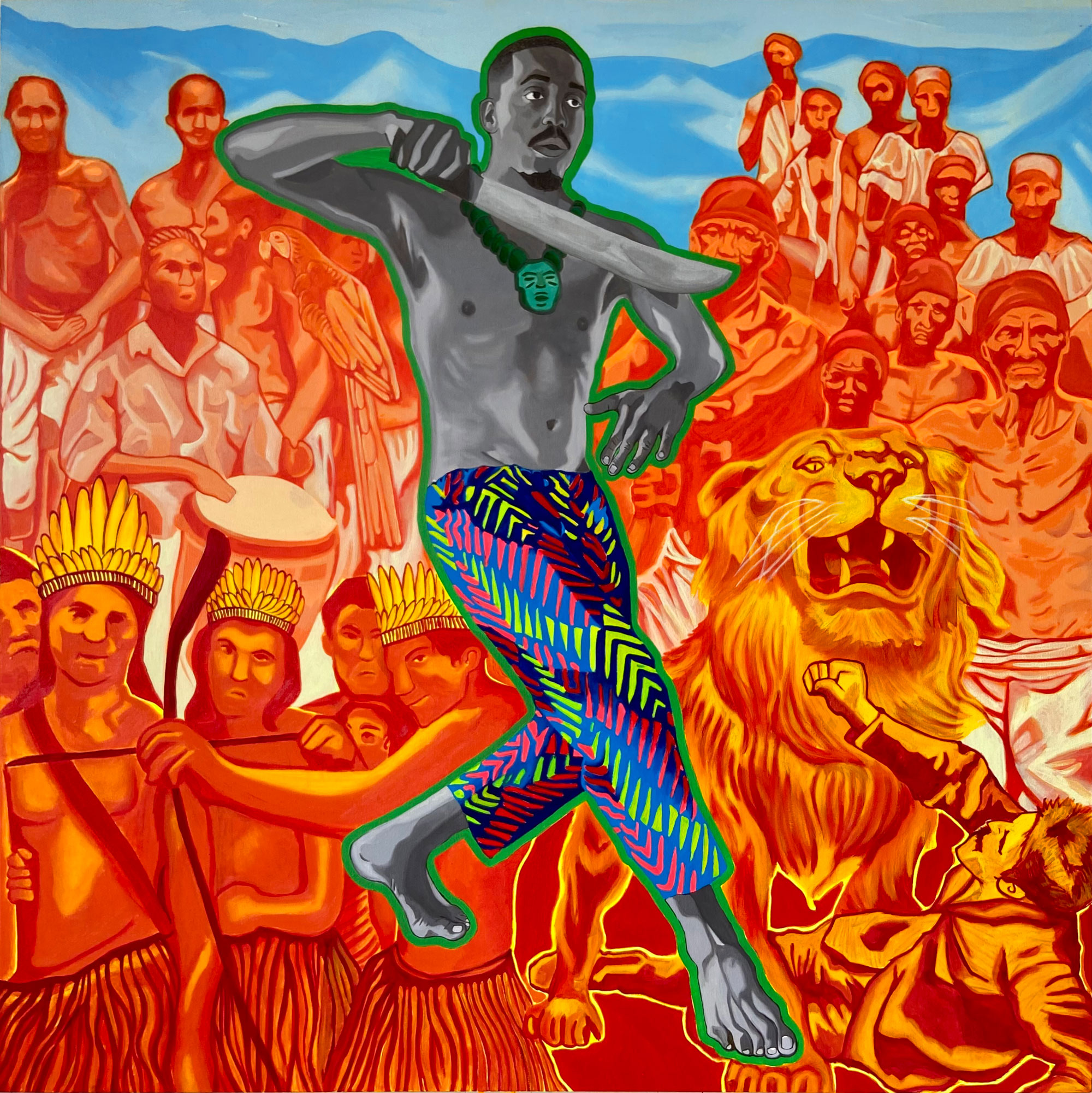
Benkos Biohó by Herbert De Paz

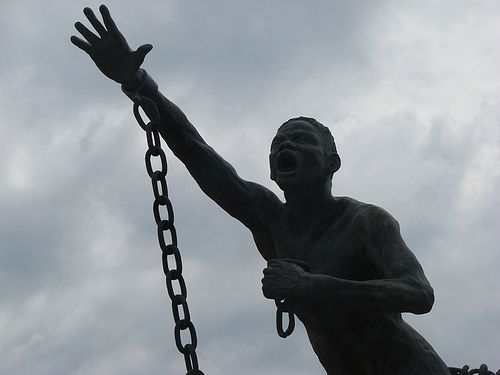
Statue of Benkos Biohó

Benkos Biohó (late 16th century — 1621), also known as Domingo Biohó, was a semi-legendary historical figure, considered a Mandinka leader, described in literature as having escaped from the slave port of Cartagena with ten other enslaved people.

While there is no direct relationship between him and the municipality of San Basilio de Palenque, contemporary literary culture has led to the belief that he was the founder of the town, though this is inaccurate.

In 1713 San Basilio de Palenque became the first free village in the Americas by decree from the King of Spain, when he gave up sending his troops on ineffectual missions to attack the fortified mountain hideaway.

== Biography ==
Biohó was born into a royal family in Guinea Bissau. He was of Mandinka origin. He was seized by the Portuguese slave trader, Pedro Gomes Reinel, sold to businessman Juan Palacios, and later, after transportation to what is now Colombia in South America, sold again to the Spaniard Alonso del Campo in 1596, in Cartagena de Indias. He made his first escape when the boat that was transporting him down the Magdalena River sank. He was recaptured but escaped again in 1599 into the marshy lands southeast of Cartagena. He organized an army that came to dominate all of the Montes de María region. He also formed an intelligence network and used the information collected to help organize more escapes and to guide the runaway slaves into the liberated territory, known as settlement. He used the title "king of Arcabuco".

On 18 July 1605, the Governor of Cartagena, Gerónimo de Suazo y Casasola, unable to defeat the Maroons, offered a peace treaty to Biohó, recognising the autonomy of the Matuna Bioho Palenque and accepting his entrance into the city armed and dressed in Spanish fashion, while the palenque promised to stop receiving more runaway slaves, cease their aid in escape attempts, and stop addressing Biohó as "king". Peace was finalized in 1612 under the governorship of Diego Fernández de Velasco (governor). The treaty was violated by the Spaniards in 1619 when they captured Biohó as he was walking carelessly into the city. He was hanged and quartered on 16 March 1621. Governor García Girón, who ordered the execution, argued bitterly that "it was dangerous the extent to which Biohó was respected in the population" and that "his lies and enchantment would drive the nations of Guinea away from the city."

The betrayal contributed to the history of distrust of Colombia's government.

By the end of the seventeenth century, Montes de María had over 600 maroons, under the command of Domingo Padilla, who claimed for himself the title of captain while his wife Jane adopted that of viceroy, and successfully challenged further attempts at sovereignty from the colonial authorities.

San Basilio de Palenque was declared Masterpieces of the Oral and Intangible Heritage of Humanity by UNESCO in 2005. At about 80 kilometres (50 mi) east of Cartagena, hills of strategic value, used as lookout posts, still bear the names of the runaway neighborhood: Sincerin, Mahates, Gambote.
