= San Basilio de Palenque =

Village in Colombia

- Populated center
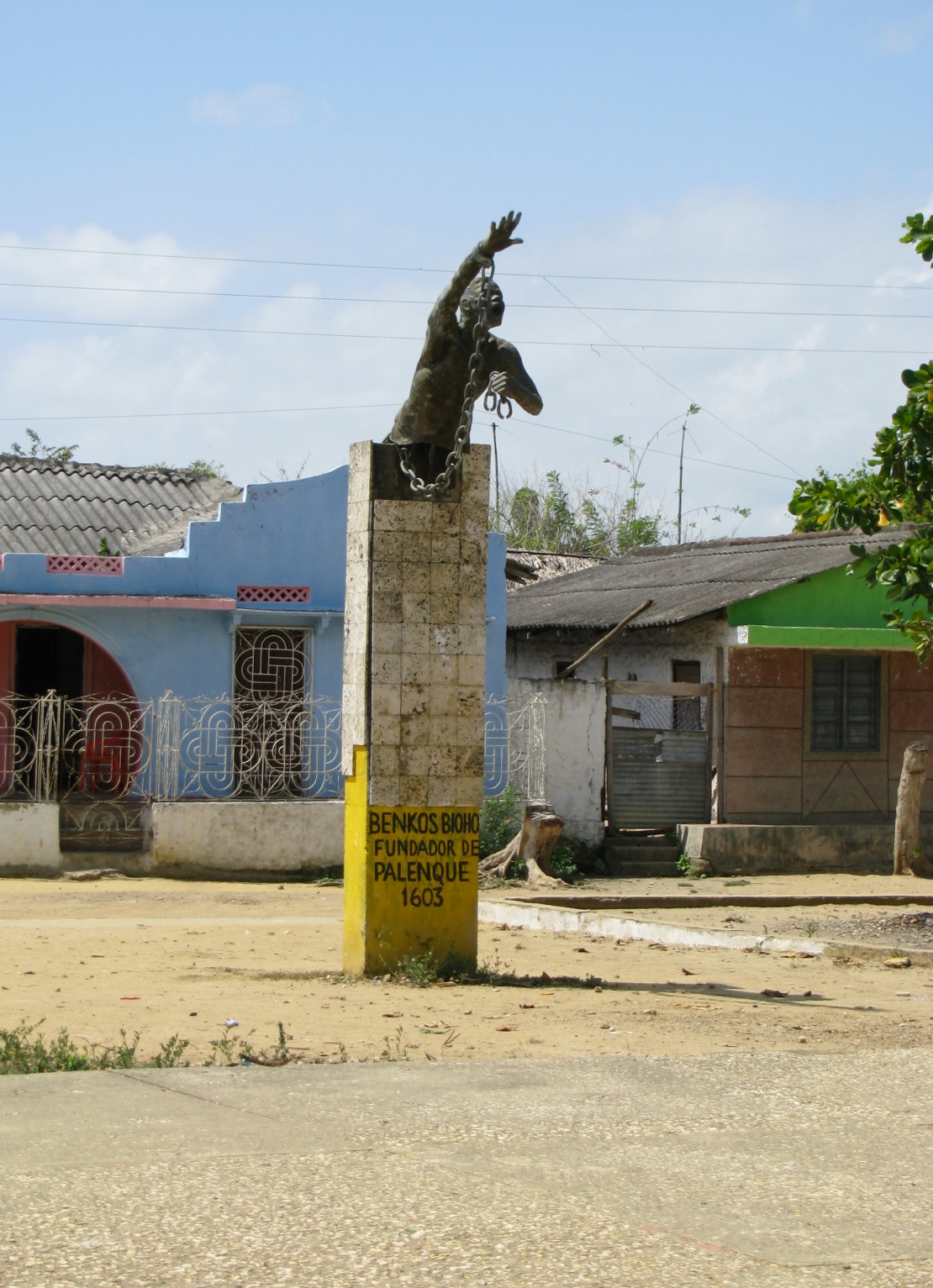
- Statue of Benkos Biohó

- Location within Colombia
- Coordinates: 10°06′12.3″N 75°11′56.8″W
- Country: Colombia
- Department: Bolívar
- Municipality: Mahates

Cultural space of Palenque de San Basilio
- UNESCO Intangible Cultural Heritage
- Country: Colombia
- Reference: 00102
- Region: South America

Inscription history
- Inscription: 2008 (3rd session)
- List: Representative

San Basilio de Palenque, often referred to by the locals simply as Palenke, is a Palenque village and populated centers of Colombia in the Municipality of Mahates, Bolivar in northern Colombia. Palenque was the first free African town in the Americas, and in 2005 was declared a Masterpiece of the Oral and Intangible Heritage of Humanity by UNESCO.

It's located close to the Canal del Dique, around 50 kilometres from Cartagenas de Indias.

== History ==
Portuguese enslaved Africans in South America through the Magdalena River Valley. Its mouth is close to the important port of Cartagena de Indias where ships full of Africans arrived. In 1599 some 30 slave runaways escaped into the forest under the leadership of Captain Benkos Biohó. The group of Maroons defeated the first expedition of 20 armed men sent against them, killing the expedition leader Juan Gómez. Some years after they escaped, they had wandered between the Matuna swamp and the Dique channel. In one of his raids to the south, Benkos Biohó found a piece of land that offered ideal conditions for establishing a settlement. King Benkos-Bioho founded his dynasty along with his wife Queen Wiwa at Matuna around 1600. Since they barricaded the place with palisades, the place was also called Palenque (Spanish for palisade, wooden fence). Although the exact year is unknown, according to mythical-historical accounts, Palenque was founded in 1603. This is the date inscribed in the Benkos Bioho statue in the main plaza of Palenque. The village was first known as Palenque de San Miguel Arcángel. This maroon community was "made up of Bozales (i.e. individuals born in Africa) as well as creoles (i.e. individuals born in the New World), many of whom must have formerly inhabited other nearby palenques". Only one century later, in January 1713 was renamed as San Basilio Magno, at a time when the maroon community had 137 homes, according to records.

Biohó played an important role in setting up the community. He declared himself King Benkos, and his palenque attracted large numbers of runaways to join his community. The Spanish arrived at terms with Biohó, but later they captured him, accused him of plotting against the Spanish, and had him hanged in 1621.

Over the years, Palenque people tried to free all enslaved Africans arriving at Cartagena and were quite successful. Therefore, the Spanish Crown issued a Royal Decree (1691), guaranteeing freedom to the Palenque de San Basilio Africans if they stopped welcoming new escapees. But runaways continued to escape to freedom in San Basilio. In 1696, the colonial authorities subdued another rebellion there, and between 1713–7. In 1713, after a prolonged period of fighting and fierce resistance from the Palenquero community, Bishop Antonio María Casiani signed an Entente Cordiale, a document that granted the community of runaway slaves the right to their land on the condition that they would not accept any new maroons. Palenqueros eventually refused to honour this agreement. In 1772, this community of maroons was included within the Mahates district, as long they no longer accepted any further runaways.

Although the number of this kind of walled communities in Colombian territory has dwindled, Palenque remains unique for its uninterrupted resistance. Ludmila Ferrari posits that:

While other maroon communities were destroyed or dispersed, Palenque remained united as a community and preserved its creole language, its "African" dances, its social organization in "kuagros," the mortuary ritual of "lumbalú", as well as a number of native traditions, many of which have unmistakable Bantu roots.

== The village ==
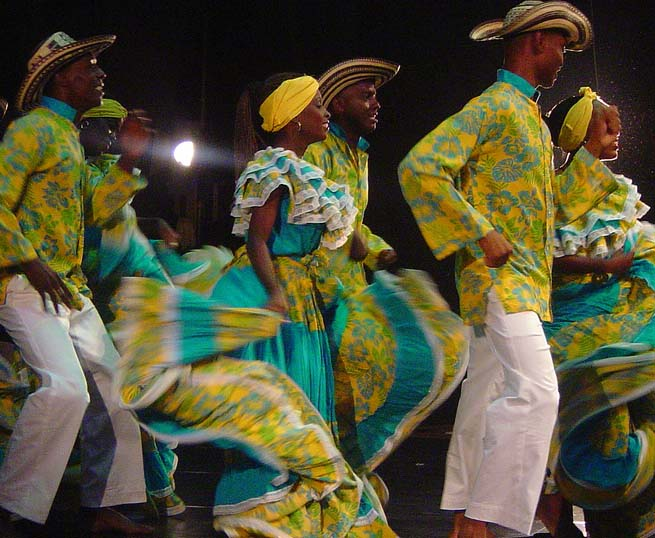
Fiesta in Palenque

The village of Palenque de San Basilio has a population of about 3,500 inhabitants and is located in the foothills of the Montes de María, southeast of the regional capital, Cartagena. The word "palenque" means "walled city" and the Palenque de San Basilio is only one of many walled communities that were founded by escaped slaves as a refuge in the seventeenth century. Of the many palenques of escaped enslaved Africans that existed previously San Basilio is the only one that survives. Many of the oral and musical traditions have roots in Palenque's African past. Africans were dispatched to Spanish America under the asiento system.

The village of San Basilio is inhabited mainly by Afro-Colombians which are direct descendants of enslaved Africans brought by the Europeans during the Colonization of the Americas and have preserved their ancestral traditions and have developed also their own language; Palenquero. In 2005, the Palenque de San Basilio village was proclaimed Masterpiece of the Oral and Intangible Heritage of Humanity by UNESCO.

In the village of Palenque de San Basilio most of its inhabitants are black and still preserve customs and language from their African ancestors. In recent years people of indigenous ancestry have settled at the borders of Palenque, being displaced earlier by the Colombian civil war.

One of the first anthropological studies of the inhabitants of Palenque de San Basilio was published by anthropologist Nina de Friedemann and photographer Richard Cross in 1979 entitled Ma Ngombe: guerreros y ganaderos en Palenque.

On 30 November 2025, residents of San Basilio de Palenque were scheduled to vote in a referendum on whether to become an independent town (municipality). However, government officials postponed it in order to clarify its scope. It is currently part of the Mahates municipality.

== Cultural Space ==
San Basilio de Palenque preserves many cultural elements of African origin. The music which joins the majority of activities is an important part of the town's culture and shapes their social practices. One example of their traditions is the "lumbalú", a funeral ceremony where the community is called with the pechiche drum, beginning nine days and nights of songs, dances and laments to commemorate the deceased.

=== Palenquero language ===
The New York Times reported on October 18, 2007 that the language spoken in Palenque is thought to be the only Spanish-based creole language spoken in South America. Being a creole language, its grammar differs substantially from Spanish making the language unintelligible to Spanish speakers. Palenquero was influenced by the Kikongo language of Congo and Angola, and also by Portuguese, the language of the slave traders who brought enslaved Bakongo people to South America in the 17th century. Exact information on the different roots of Palenquero is still lacking, and there are different theories of its origin. In 2007, fewer than half of the community's 3,000 residents still spoke Palenquero.

A linguist born in Palenquero is compiling a lexicon for the language and others are assembling a dictionary of Palenquero. The defenders of Palenquero continue working to keep the language alive.

=== Dancing ===
Afro-Colombian rituals have influenced a massive part of the Caribbean coast of Colombia as well as other regions of the country with the purpose of commemorating different events or the funeral rite. Like the music and the Palenquero language, the dancing is a recognition of the local culture, the coexistence of ethnicities, and abolishment of slavery.

Mapalé is a notable traditional dance, among the most recognizable of Palenque, which consists of an erotic exaltation between men and women. The movements require strength and the outfits recall the Africans who rejected enslavement. The dance is based on rapid movement of the hips and shoulders. Couples dance separately while making acrobatic figures. The music that accompanies the dancing is produced by instruments such as percussion, different type of drums such as llamador or alegre, tambora, maracas o guache.

== Notable residents ==
- Benkos Biohó
- Antonio Cervantes
- Evaristo Márquez
- Ricardo Cardona
- Prudencio Cardona

== See also ==
- Masterpieces of the Oral and Intangible Heritage of Humanity
- UNESCO Intangible Cultural Heritage Lists
- Quilombo
- Maroons
