= Chía, Cundinamarca =

Chía
- Municipality and city
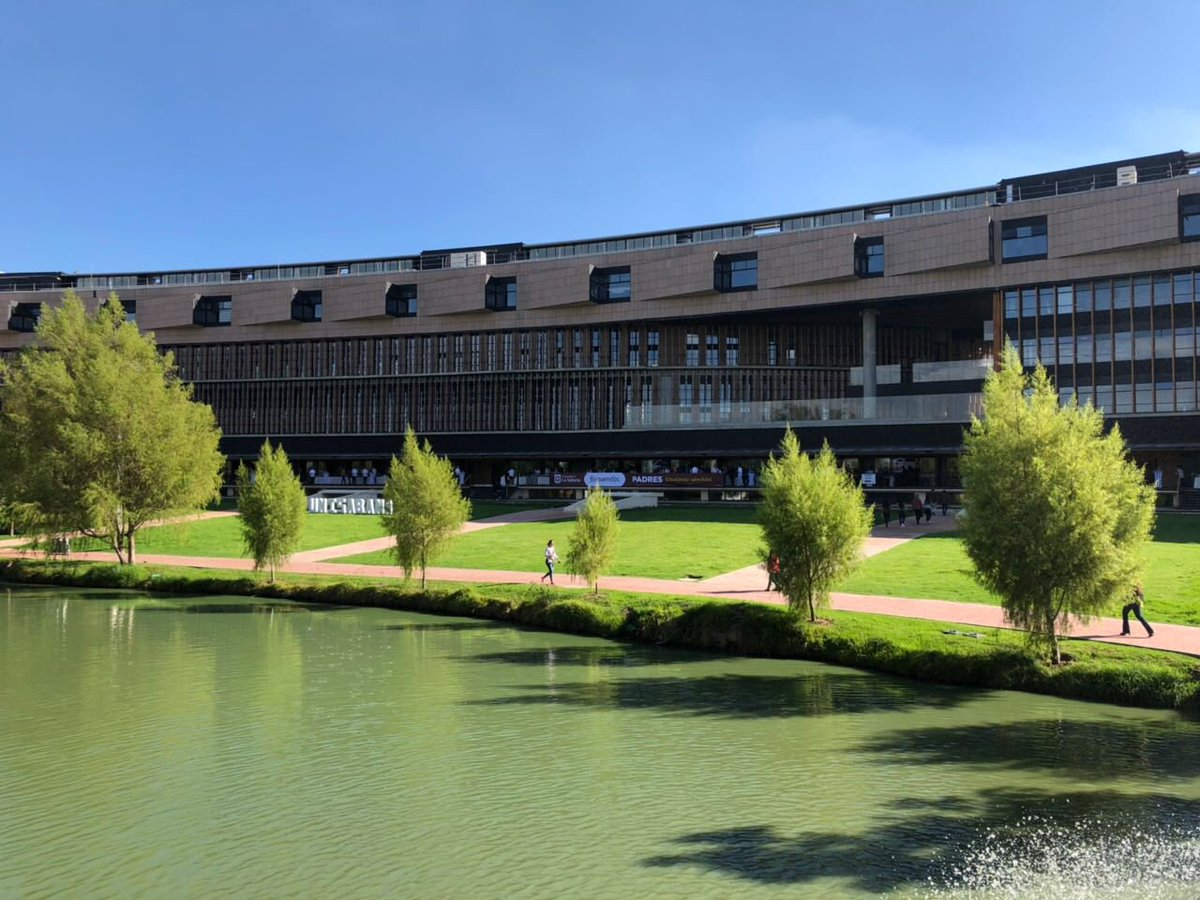
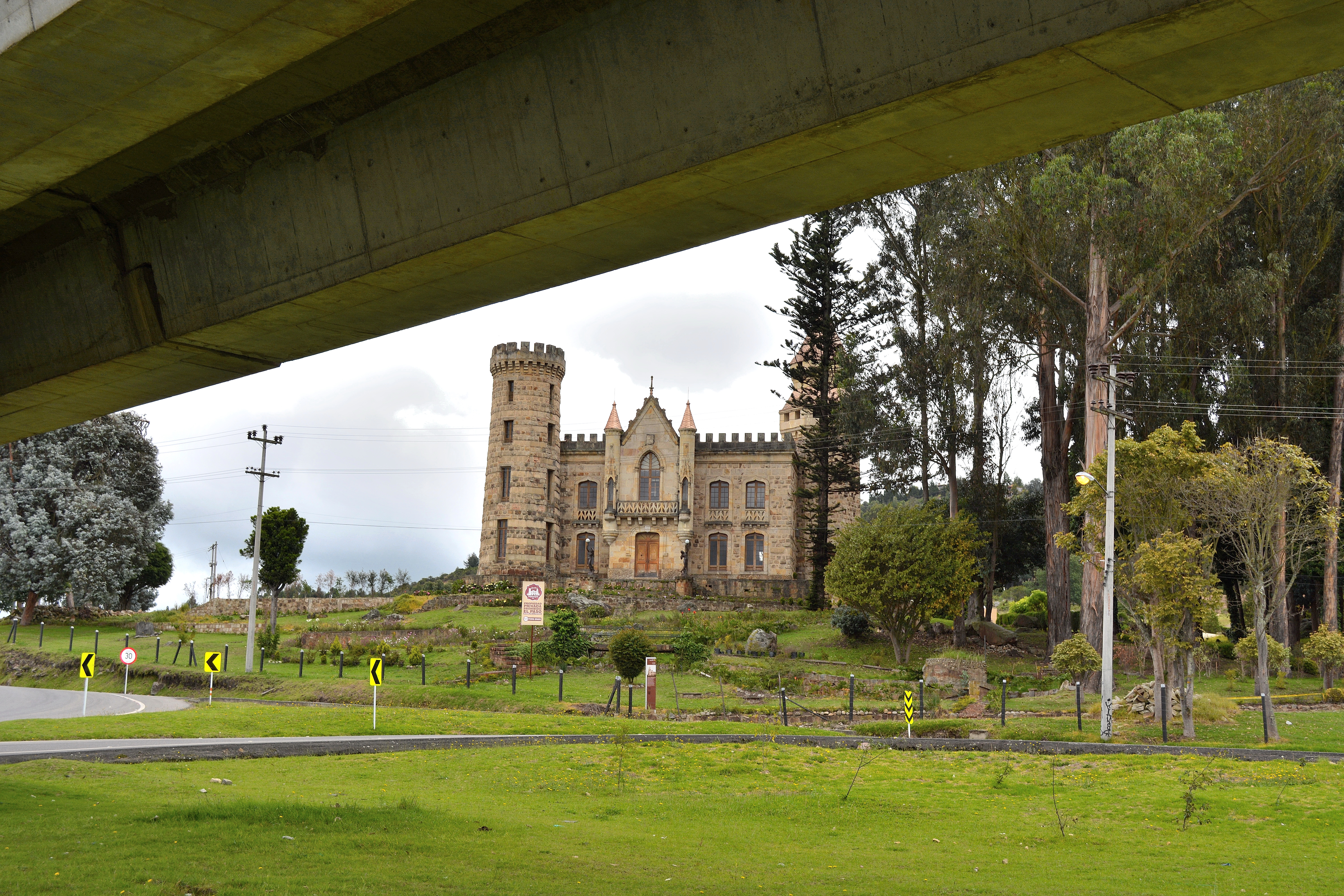
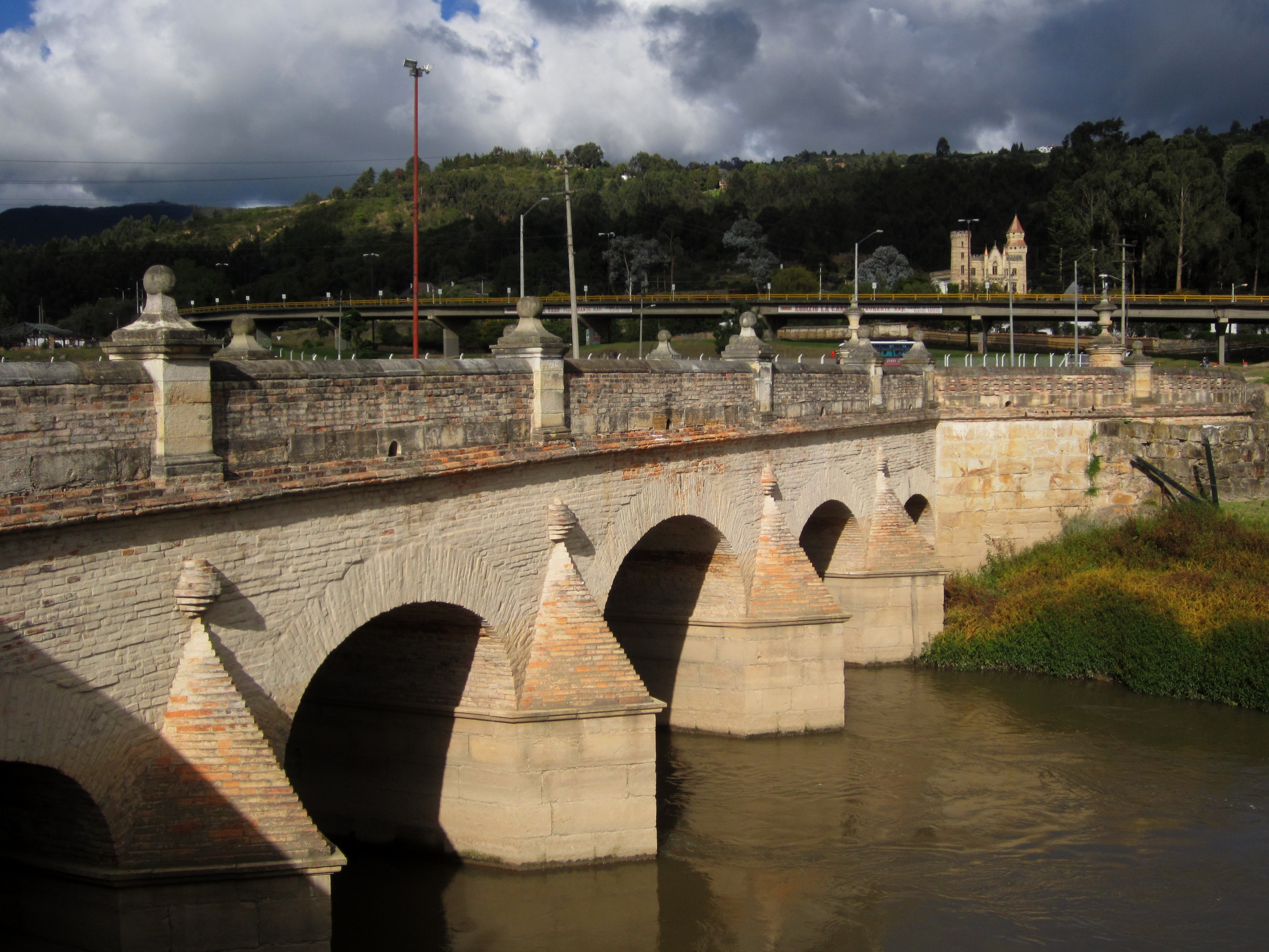
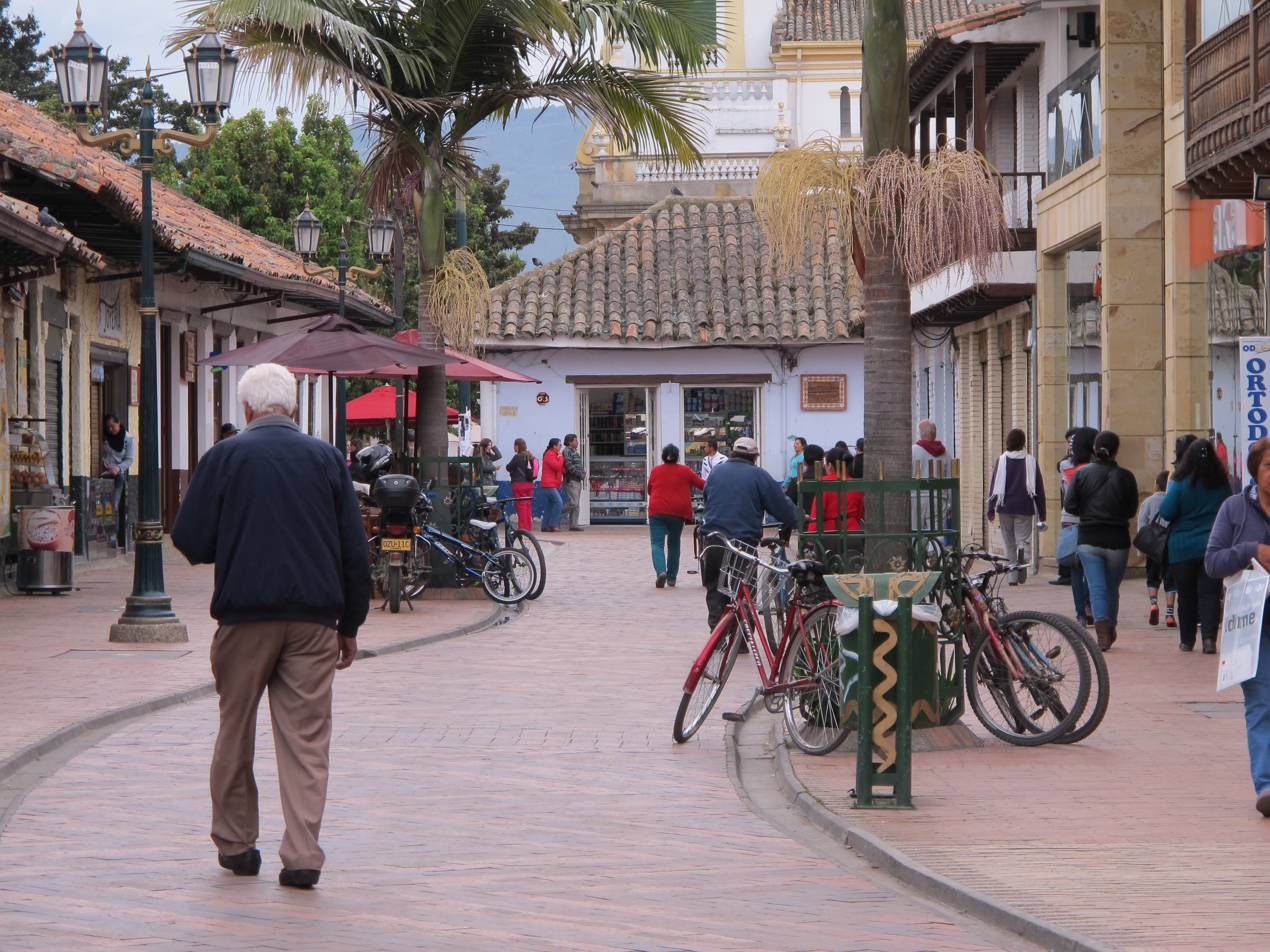
- Top: University of La Sabana, Second: Marroquin Castle, Third: Puente del Común, Four: Downtown Chía

- Flag Coat of arms
- Nickname: pueblo of the Moon
- Location of the town and municipality of Chia in Cundinamarca Department.

- Location within Colombia
- Coordinates: 4°51′N 74°03′W
- Country: Colombia
- Department: Cundinamarca
- Province: Central Savanna
- Founded: 24 March 1537
- Founder: Gonzalo Jiménez de Quesada

Government
  - Mayor: Leonardo Donoso Ruiz. (2024–2027)

Area
  - Municipality and city: 80.16 km^{2} (30.95 sq mi)
  - Urban: 19.16 km^{2} (7.40 sq mi)
- Elevation: 2,564 m (8,412 ft)

Population (2020 est.)
  - Municipality and city: 149,570
  - Density: 1,866/km^{2} (4,833/sq mi)
  - Urban: 124,309
  - Urban density: 6,488/km^{2} (16,800/sq mi)
- Demonym: Chiense
- Time zone: UTC-5
- Website: Official website

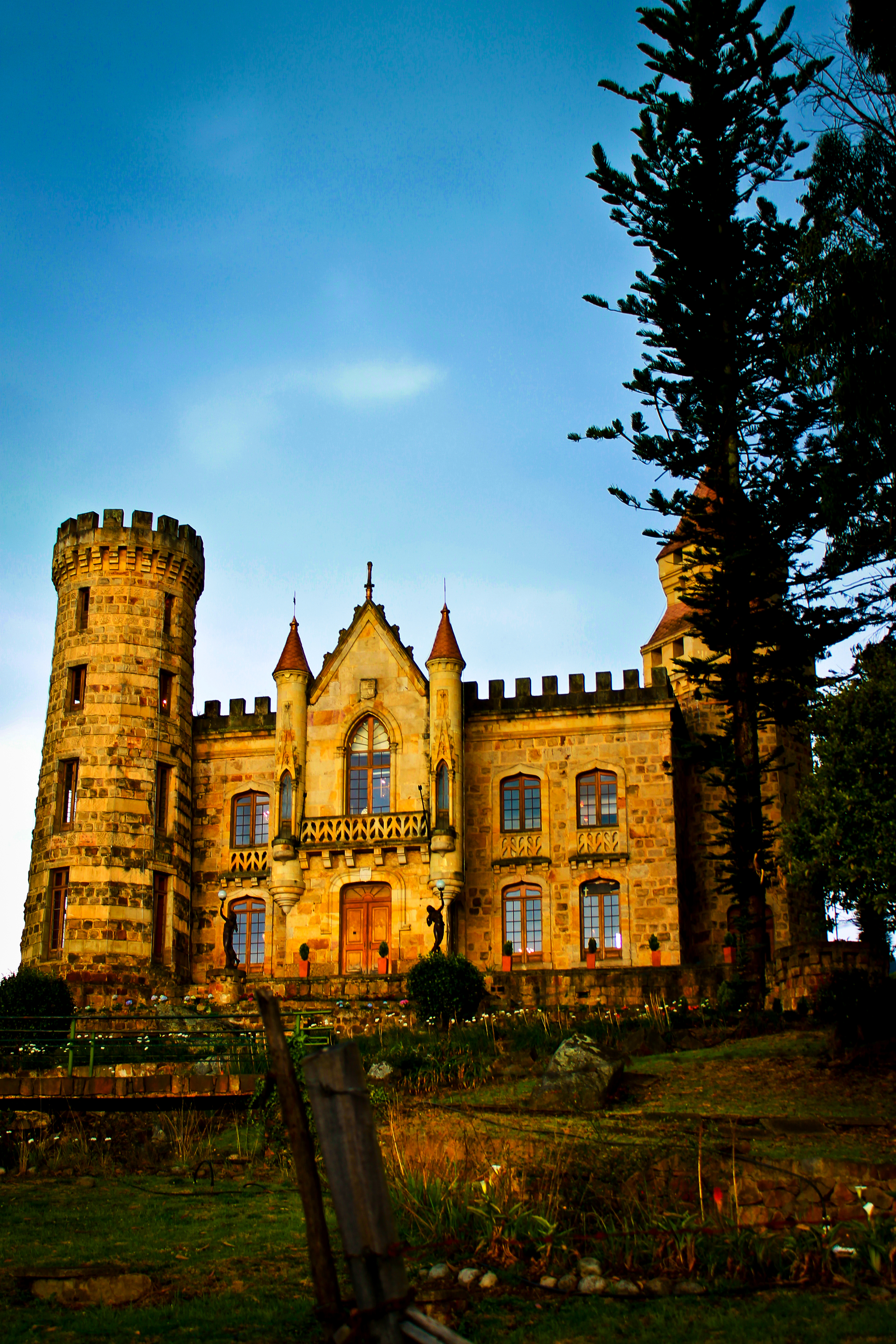
Castillo Marroquín

Chía is a city and municipality in the department of Cundinamarca in Colombia, located 10 km north of Bogotá on the main road to Zipaquira. Due to its proximity to Bogotá

Its history dates back to the pre-Columbian era. Chía is also known for its gastronomy and its variety of restaurants.

It is also home to the Universidad de la Sabana, one of the most prestigious universities in the country.

== Etymology ==
The place name "Chía" in Chibcha language or Muisca language refers to the Moon as a star and as a goddess of the Muisca mythology, in whose honour there was a temple built in the Pre-Columbian town.

== History ==
Chía was inhabited first by indigenous groups during the Herrera Period and later by the Muisca, as an important settlement in the pre-Columbian era. It was a ceremonial center of worship to the Moon goddess Chía. On March 24, 1537, the Spanish, under the command of Gonzalo Jiménez de Quesada, took possession of the town.

In 1781, during the Revolt of the Comuneros, the march of the insurgents towards Bogotá stopped near Chía in order to cross the Bogotá River, in what is now known as the Bridge of the Commoners (Spanish: Puente del Común). At that site, the viceroy signed a series of concessions to the rebels. However, once the rebel group had dispersed, the viceroy declared the concessions invalid for having been signed "under pressure".

== Borders ==
- North with Cajicá
- South with Bogotá localities Usaquén and Suba
- West with Tabio and Tenjo
- Southwest with Cota
- East with Sopó
- Southeast with La Calera.

== Other information ==
- Market Day: Sunday
- Median temperature: 14 °C
- DANE Code: 25175

== Sites of interest ==
- Marroquín Castle (El Castillo Marroquín) – a building built in 1898, located in the grounds of the Hacienda El Castillo in the sector of La Caro, north of Bogotá. It is a building by the French architect Gastón Lelarge. The castle is a cultural heritage and is used for events and meetings of various types.
- Hacienda Yerbabuena
- Puente del Común
- Centro Comercial Consteación (Carrera 9)
- Chía Mall (Centro-Chía)
- Andrés Carne de Res
- Iglesia la Valvanera
- Biblioteca Publica Municipal HOQABIGA
- Parque Santander
- Fontanar Mall (Centro Comercial Fontanar)
- La Montaña del Oso – a natural park located in the village of Yerbabuena, about 3200 meters above sea level. It is possible to take guided ecological walks, as well as camping.
- Chapel of Our Lady of Valvanera (Capilla de Nuestra Señora de la Valvanera) – located at the top of the western hill of Chía, and is visible almost from any point of the municipality. It can be reached by walking on the steps built for this purpose, or by the two existing roads on land. Eucharistic celebrations are held every Sunday and from the adjacent balcony, there is also a panoramic view of the municipality. The road that leads to the other side of the hill (the "Boquerón") towards the municipality of Tenjo is also a frequent site for mountain biking, along with the other road that crosses the hill a little further north and that will give the municipality of Tabio (known as "Lourdes").

== Sports facilities ==
- Coliseo de la Luna (8,000 spectators), playing ground for the basketball team Cóndores de Cundinamarca
- Sports unit "Rio Frio"
- Olympic village
- BMX Track "Iván de Jesús Barrientos"
- Unidad Deportiva"Bojaca".
- Estadio Municipal Villa Olímpica.

== Climate ==
Climate data for Chía (Guaymaral Airport), elevation 2,560 m (8,400 ft), (1971–2000)
Month	Jan	Feb	Mar	Apr	May	Jun	Jul	Aug	Sep	Oct	Nov	Dec	Year
Mean daily maximum °C (°F)	20.8 (69.4)	20.9 (69.6)	20.4 (68.7)	20.1 (68.2)	19.5 (67.1)	18.7 (65.7)	18.4 (65.1)	18.9 (66.0)	19.3 (66.7)	19.8 (67.6)	20.2 (68.4)	20.4 (68.7)	19.8 (67.6)
Daily mean °C (°F)	13.0 (55.4)	13.3 (55.9)	13.6 (56.5)	13.8 (56.8)	13.6 (56.5)	13.1 (55.6)	12.8 (55.0)	13.0 (55.4)	13.1 (55.6)	13.2 (55.8)	13.2 (55.8)	13.0 (55.4)	13.2 (55.8)
Mean daily minimum °C (°F)	6.8 (44.2)	7.5 (45.5)	8.5 (47.3)	9.2 (48.6)	9.3 (48.7)	9.1 (48.4)	8.6 (47.5)	8.3 (46.9)	8.2 (46.8)	8.6 (47.5)	8.9 (48.0)	7.7 (45.9)	8.4 (47.1)
Average precipitation mm (inches)	28.8 (1.13)	47.9 (1.89)	65.4 (2.57)	100.5 (3.96)	89.9 (3.54)	54.1 (2.13)	39.4 (1.55)	41.2 (1.62)	65.7 (2.59)	99.1 (3.90)	85.0 (3.35)	45.7 (1.80)	762.7 (30.03)
Average precipitation days	8	10	12	16	20	17	16	16	14	17	17	12	176
Average relative humidity (%)	75	75	76	79	79	78	77	76	77	79	79	77	77
Mean monthly sunshine hours	167.4	132.9	120.9	99.0	105.4	99.0	117.8	111.6	102.0	105.4	123.0	167.4	1,451.8
Mean daily sunshine hours	5.4	4.7	3.9	3.3	3.4	3.3	3.8	3.6	3.4	3.4	4.1	5.4	4.0
Source: Instituto de Hidrologia Meteorologia y Estudios Ambientales

== Gallery ==
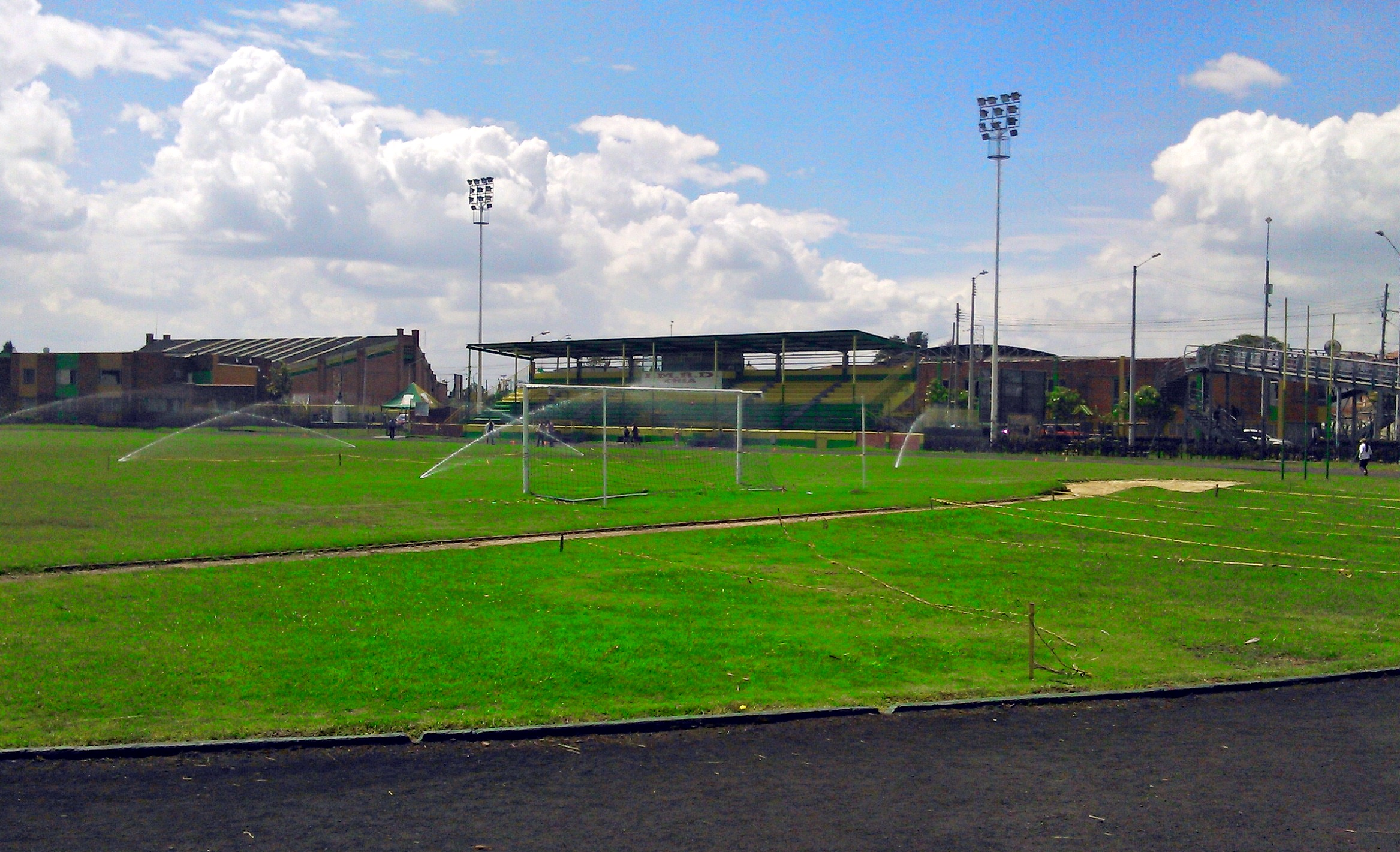
Football pitch

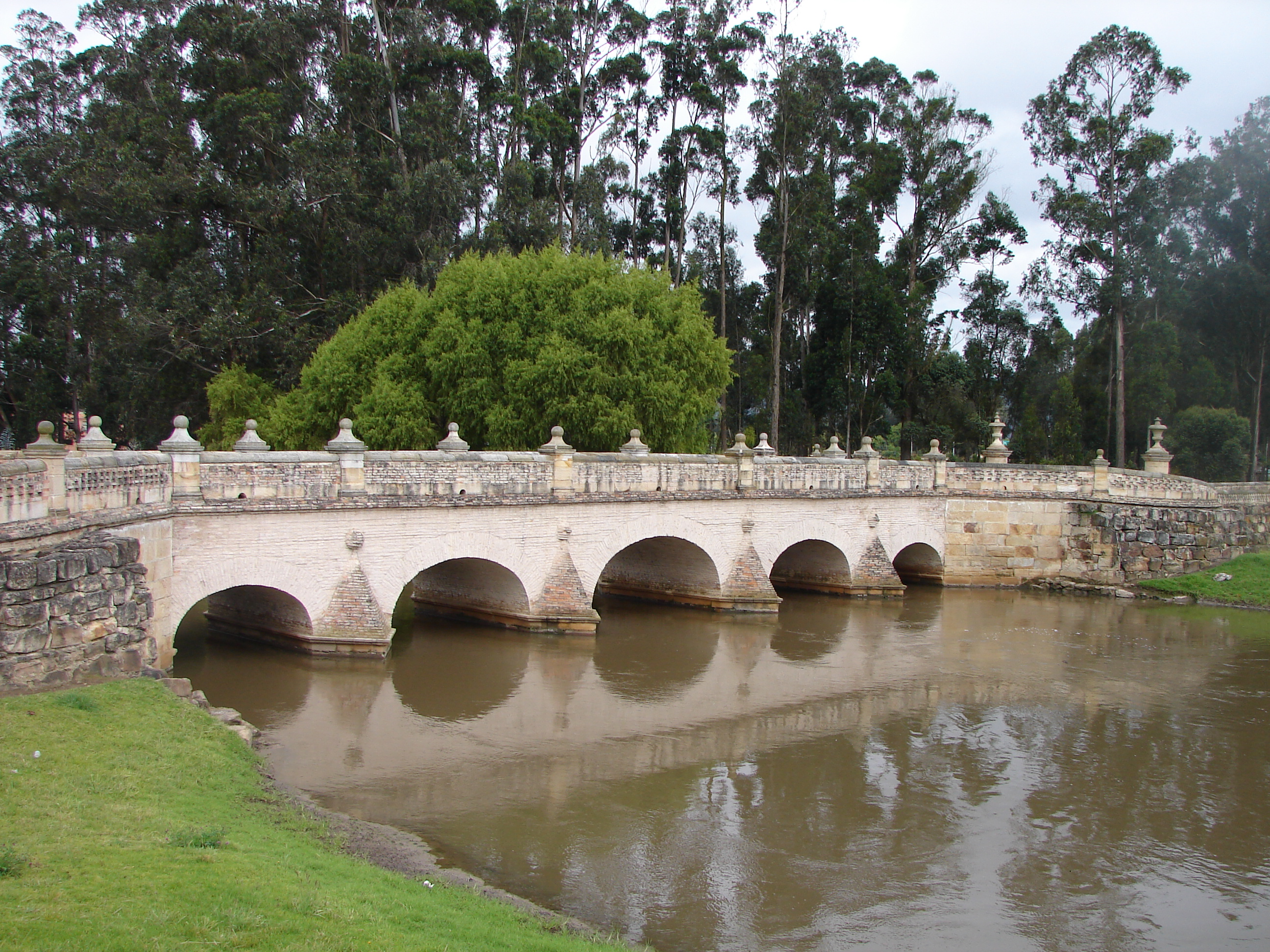
Puente El Común

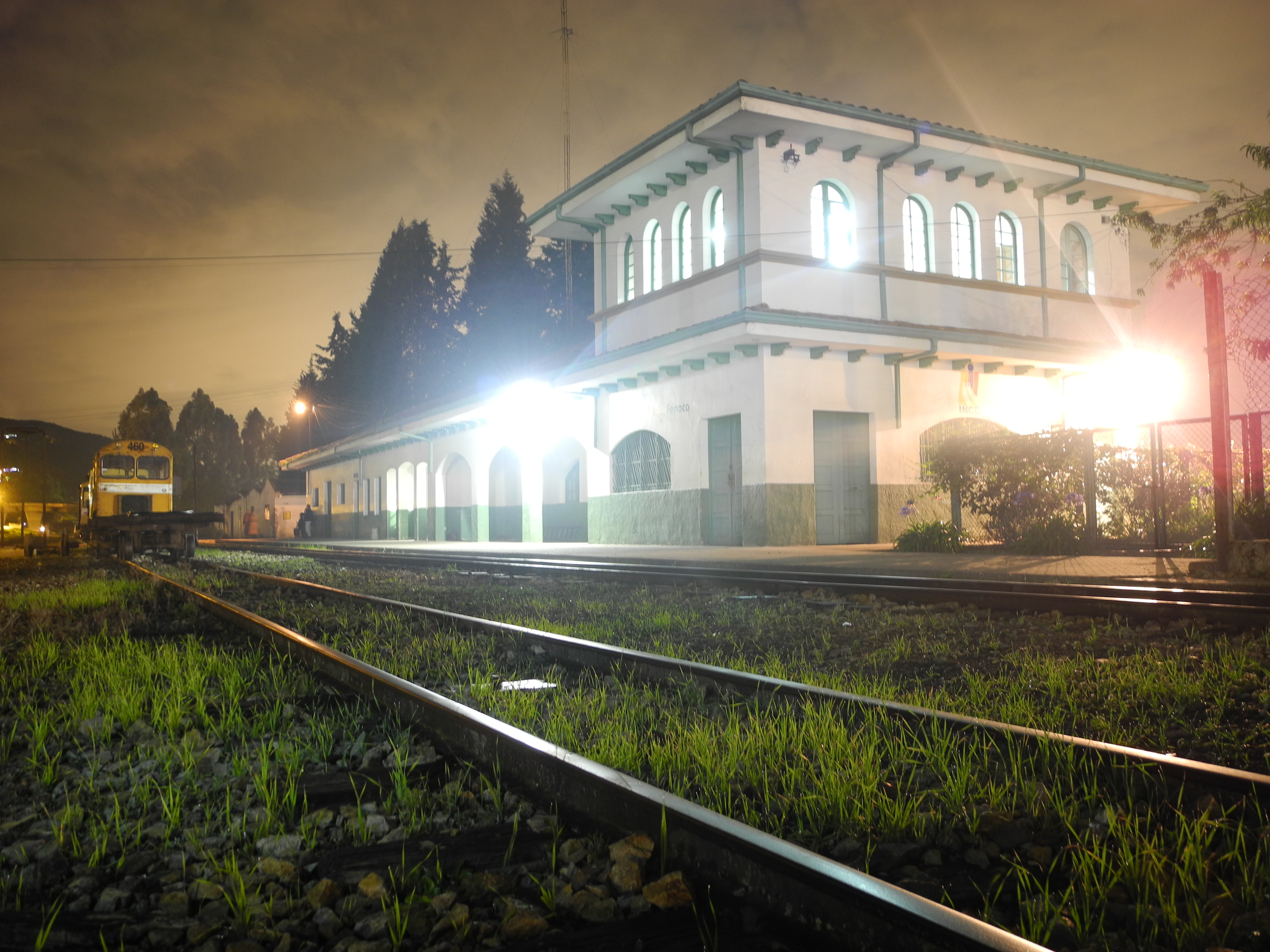
La Caro Railway Station
