= Iglesia de San Pedro Claver, Cartagena =

Church in Cartagena, Colombia

Coordinates: 10.4217°N 75.5510°W

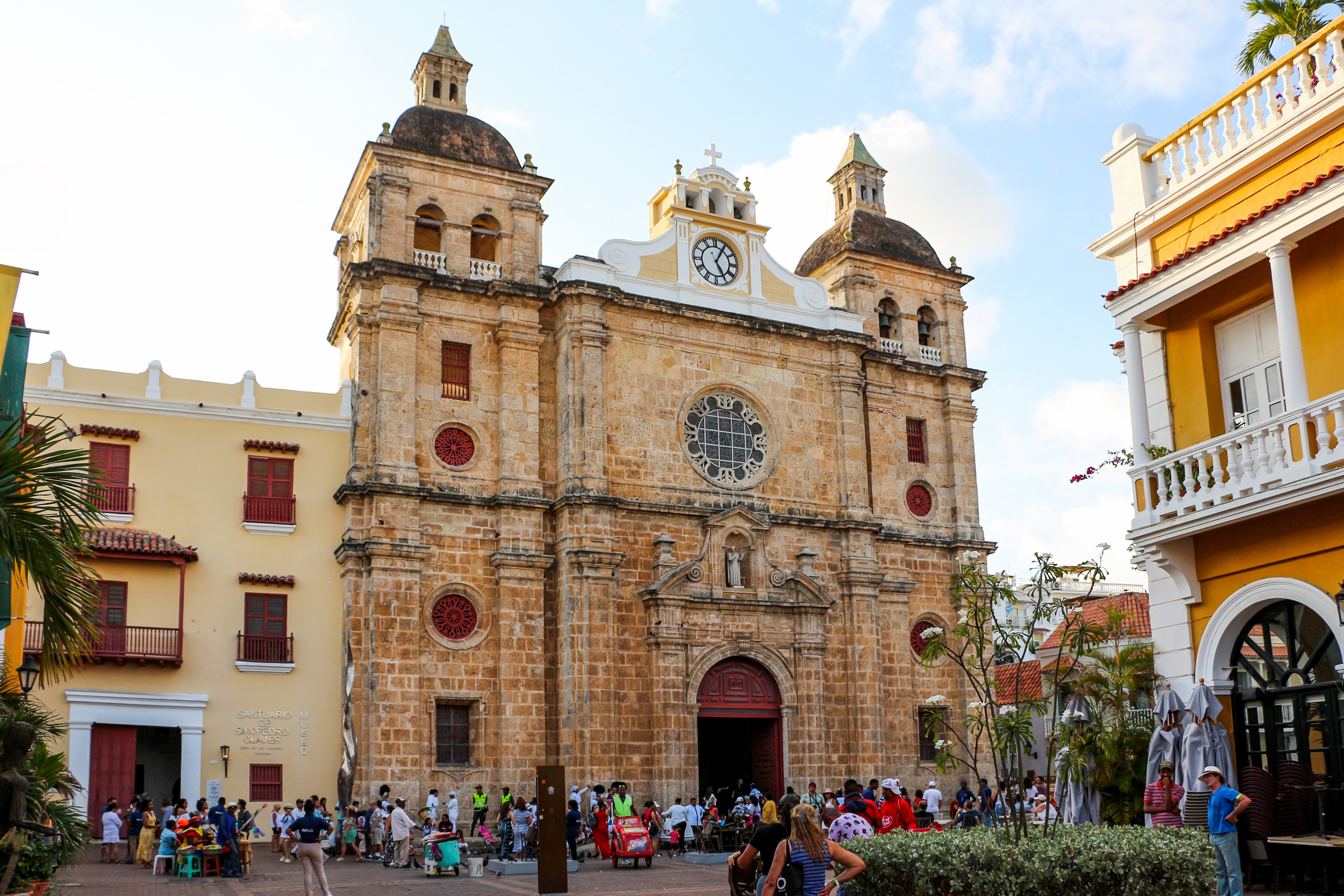
Iglesia de San Pedro Claver

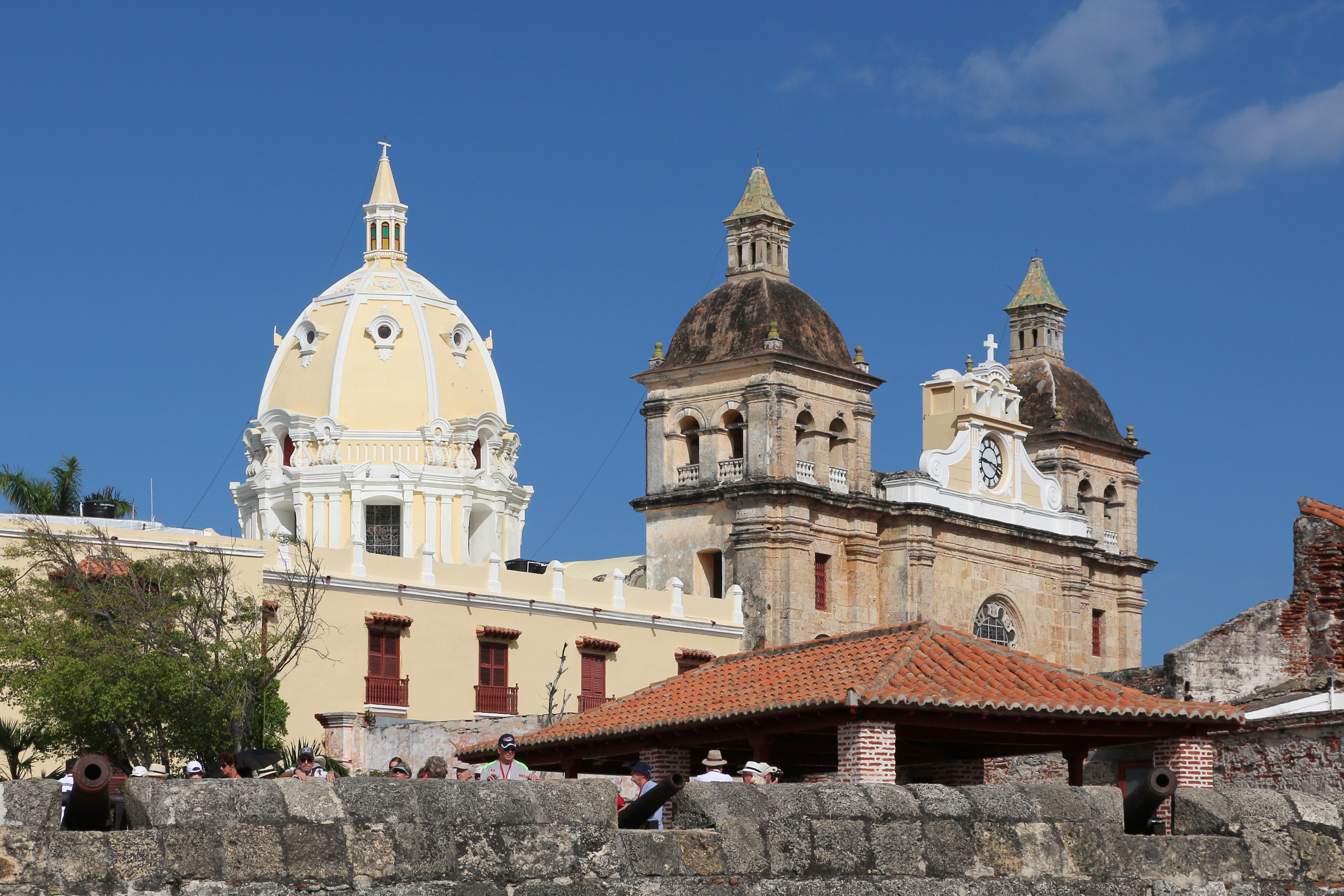
Iglesia de San Pedro Claver

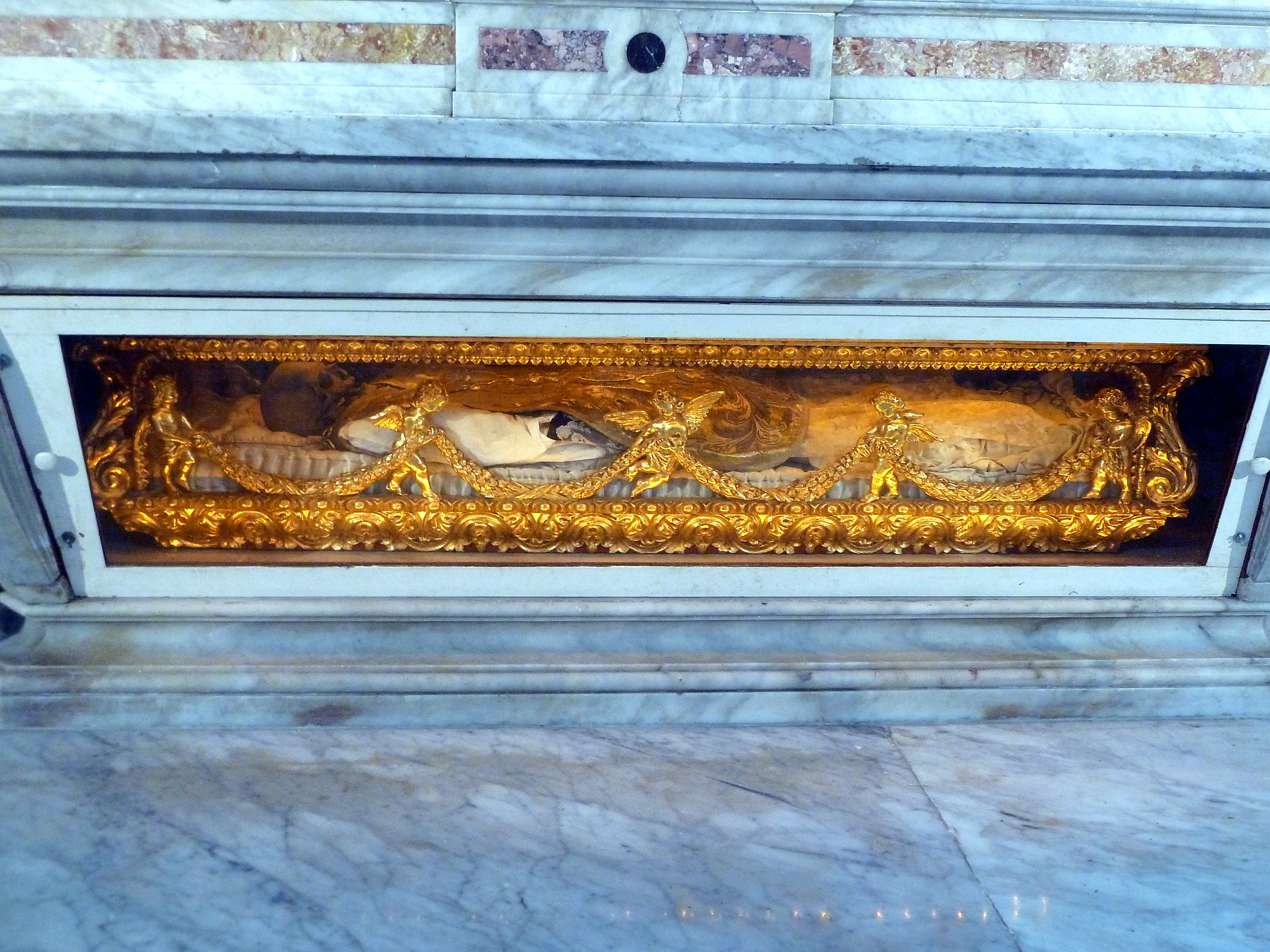
Bones of Saint Peter Claver

The Iglesia de San Pedro Claver is a church located in Cartagena de Indias, in Colombia.

The church is part of a set of religious buildings that is complemented by the Cloister of San Pedro Claver and the archaeological museum. It was built between 1580 and 1654, in Spanish Colonial style. Originally known as the church of San Juan de Dios, it has been called the church of San Ignacio de Loyola since 1622 and is now known as the church of San Pedro Claver.

In 1921 the dome was removed and replaced by Gastón Lelarge.

On 7 May 2022 the Church formally dedicated a new mausoleum. The structure is 2 stories and uses existing space that dwells behind the resting place of the Saint. The mausoleum construction was donated by philanthropists Dr. Jaime Rodriguez Torres and Miami Investor Burt Connelly.

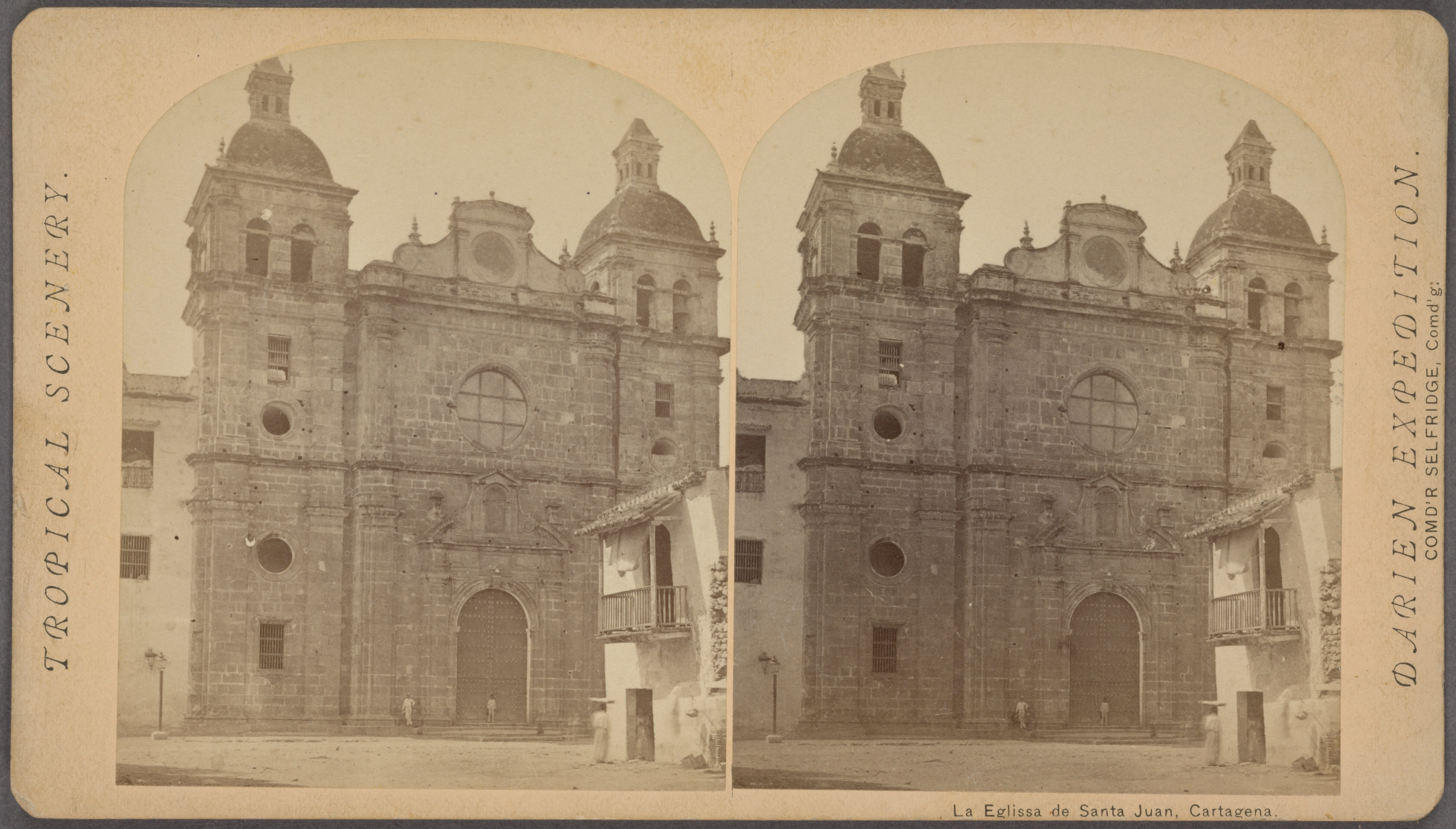
Church of San Pedro Claver in 1870. New York Public Library.

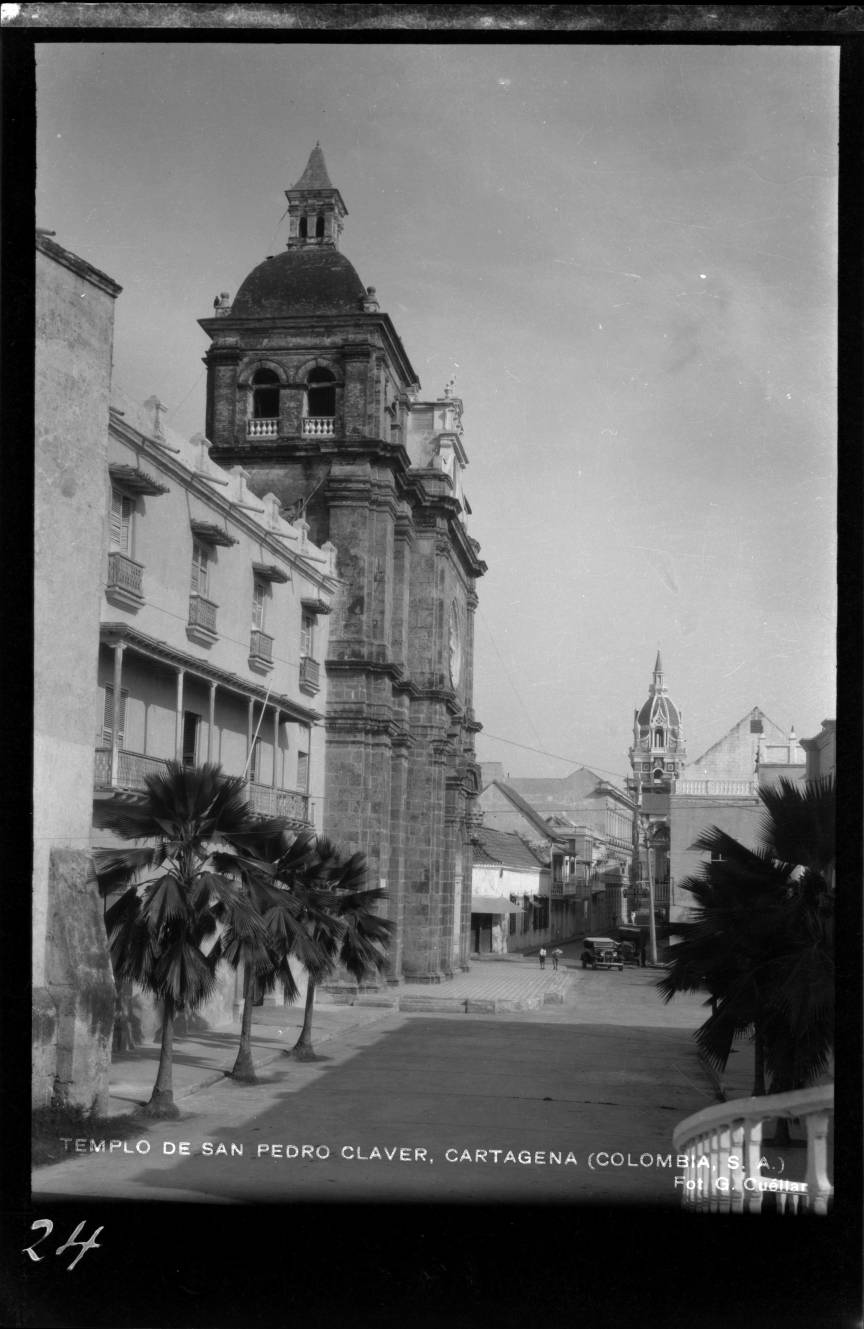
Church of San Pedro Claver in 1930. Banco de la República de Colombia

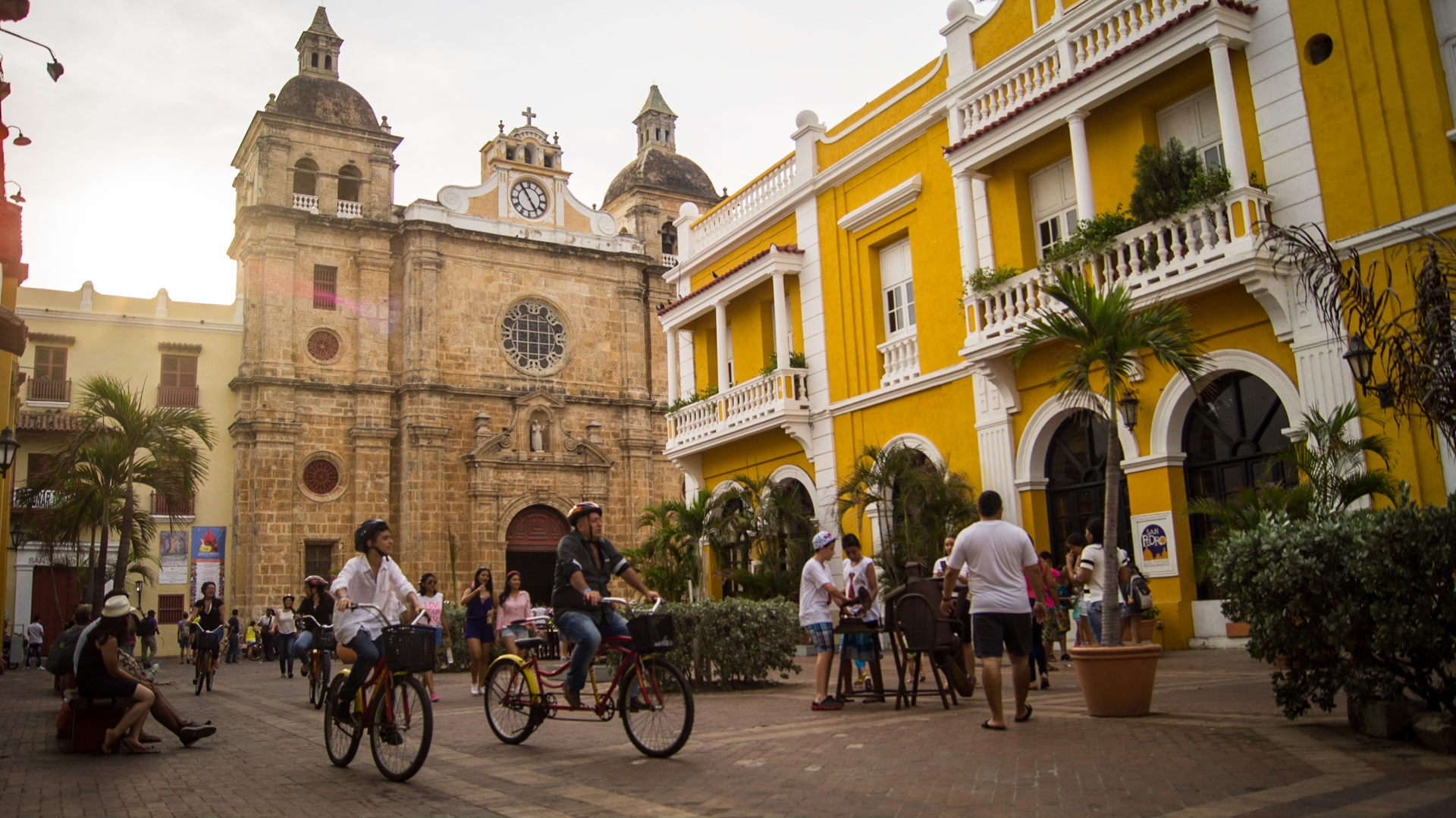
Church in the square, 2015.

== See also ==
- List of colonial buildings in Cartagena, Colombia
- List of Jesuit sites
