= Peter Claver =

Spanish Jesuit missionary and saint (1580–1654)

Saint Peter Claver SJ
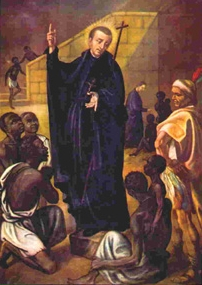
- Petrus Claver, Aethiopum Servus (Peter Claver, Slave of the Africans)
- Born: 26 June 1580; Verdú, Crown of Aragon, Spanish Monarchy, Spanish Empire,
- Died: 8 September 1654 (aged 74); Cartagena, New Kingdom of Granada, Spanish Empire
- Venerated in: Catholic Church, Evangelical Lutheran Church in America
- Beatified: 20 July 1850, Rome by Pope Pius IX
- Canonized: 15 January 1888, Rome by Pope Leo XIII
- Major shrine: Iglesia de San Pedro Claver, Cartagena
- Feast: 9 September
- Patronage: Slaves, Colombia, race relations, ministry to African Americans, seafarers

Peter Claver (Catalan: Pere Claver i Sobocano, Spanish: Pedro Claver y Corberó; 26 June 1580 – 8 September 1654) was a Spanish Jesuit priest and missionary born in Verdú, Spain, Spanish Empire, who, due to his life and work, became the patron saint of slaves, Colombia, seafarers, and ministry to African Americans.

During the 40 years of his ministry in the New Kingdom of Granada, it is estimated he personally baptized around 300,000 people and annually heard the confessions of over 5,000. He is considered a heroic example of Christian charity and engagement for human rights.

The Congress of Colombia declared September 9 as the National Day of Human Rights in his honor.

== Early life ==
Claver was born in 1580 into a devoutly Catholic and prosperous farming family in the village of Verdú, Urgell, located in Spain about 54 miles (87 km) from Barcelona. He was born 70 years after King Ferdinand of Spain set the colonial slavery culture into motion by authorizing the purchase of 250 African slaves in Lisbon for his territories in New Spain.

Later, as a student at the University of Barcelona, Claver was noted for his intelligence and piety. After two years of study, Claver wrote these words in his notebook: "I must dedicate myself to the service of God until death, on the understanding that I am like a slave."

== Formation and Work in the New World ==
After he had completed his studies, Claver entered the Society of Jesus in Tarragona at the age of 20. When he had completed the novitiate, he was sent to study philosophy at Palma, Mallorca. While there, he came to know the porter of the college, Alphonsus Rodriguez, a laybrother known for his holiness and gift of prophecy. Rodriguez felt that he had been told by God that Claver was to spend his life in service in the colonies of New Spain, and he frequently urged the young student to accept that calling. Rodriguez was later canonized.

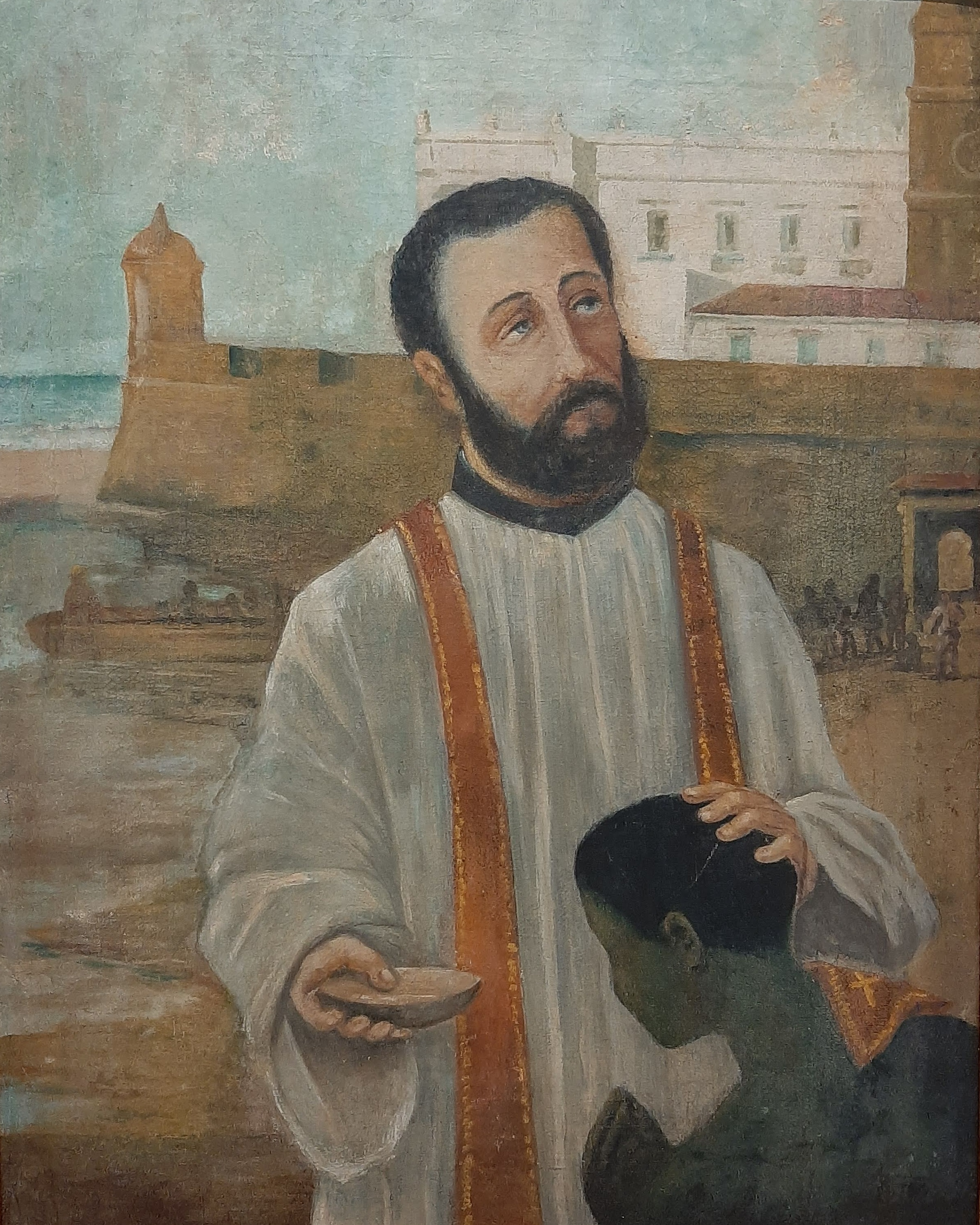
Portrait of St. Peter Claver in the museum Palace of Inquisition, Cartagena, Colombia

Claver volunteered for the Spanish colonies and was sent to the New Kingdom of Granada, where he arrived in the port city of Cartagena in 1615 to work under missionary Alonso de Sandoval. Required to spend six years studying theology before being ordained a priest, he lived in Jesuit houses at Tunja and Bogotá. During those preparatory years, he was deeply disturbed by the harsh treatment and living conditions of the black slaves who were brought from Africa.

By this time, the slave trade had been established in the Americas for about a century. Local Native Americans were considered physically ill-suited to work in the gold and silver mines. Mine owners met their labor requirements by importing blacks from Angola and Congo, whom they purchased in West Africa for four crowns a head or bartered for goods and sold in America for an average two hundred crowns apiece. Others were captured at random, especially able-bodied males and females deemed suitable for labor.

Cartagena was a slave-trading hub and 10,000 slaves poured into the port yearly, crossing the Atlantic from West Africa under conditions so foul that an estimated one-third died in transit. Although the slave trade was condemned by Pope Paul III and Urban VIII had issued a papal decree prohibiting slavery, (later called "supreme villainy" by Pope Pius IX), it was a lucrative business and continued to flourish.

Claver's predecessor in his eventual lifelong mission, Alonso de Sandoval, was his mentor and inspiration. Sandoval devoted himself to serving the slaves for 40 years before Claver arrived to continue his work. Sandoval attempted to learn about their customs and languages; he was so successful that, when he returned to Seville, he wrote a book in 1627 about the nature, customs, rites and beliefs of the Africans. Sandoval found Claver an apt pupil. When he was solemnly professed in 1622, Claver signed his final profession document in Latin as: Petrus Claver, aethiopum semper servus (Peter Claver, servant of the Ethiopians [i.e. Africans] forever).

== Ministry to the enslaved ==
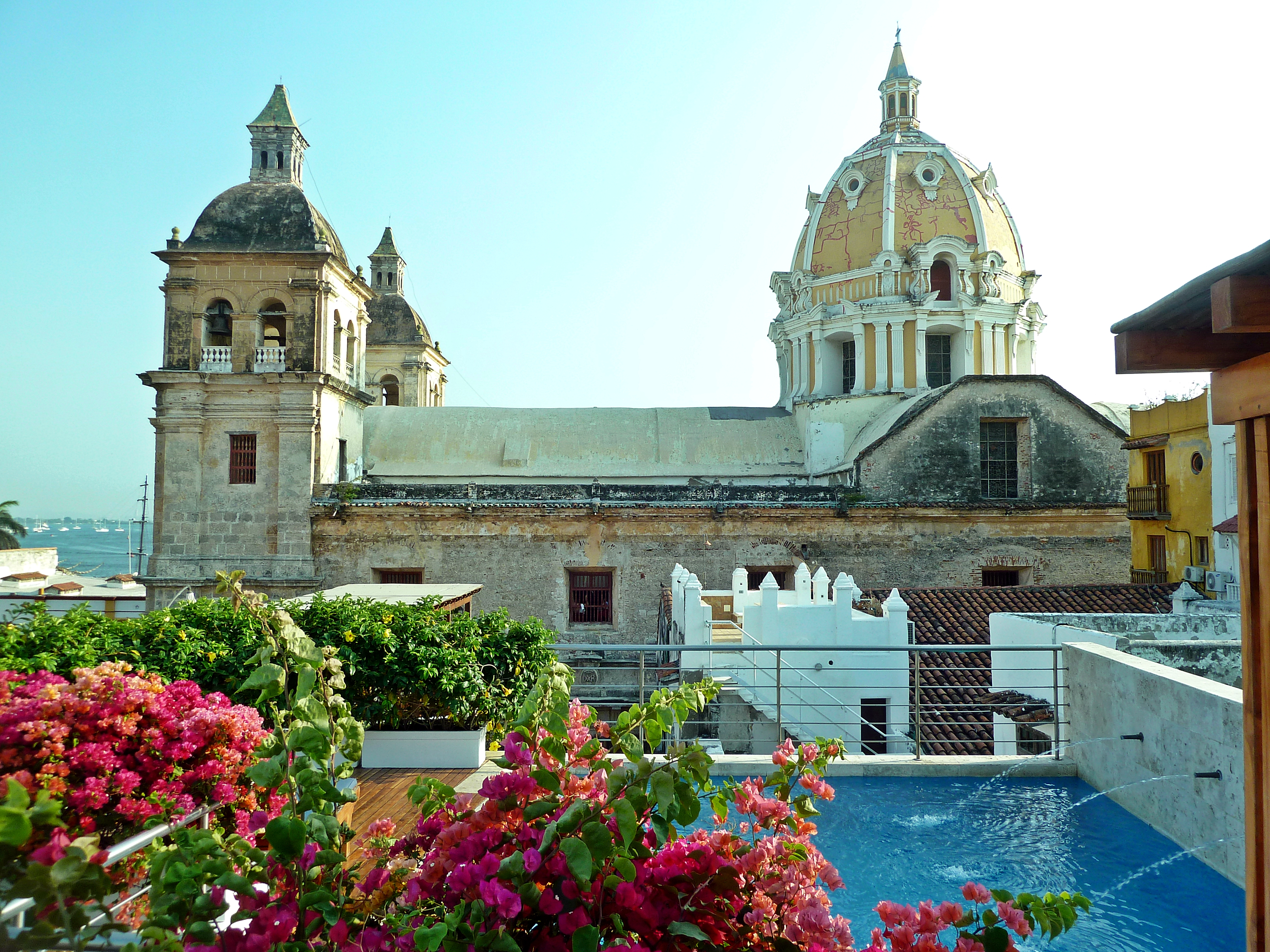
Church of St. Peter Claver in Cartagena, Colombia, where Claver lived and ministered

Peter Claver took a great deal of influence from Sandoval in his missionary work. He would meet the enslaved Africans aboard the slave ships on which they arrived, often being one of the first people they saw after landing in Cartagena. Preparations for incoming ships started early and allowed Claver's catechism to reach mass numbers of slaves, many of whom he knew would have a limited amount of time before their death following the voyage across the Atlantic. It was a typical practice for the Jesuits to bring food such as fruits and citrus, as well as water and tobacco to the slaves as they met them on board. Claver gained his reputation from charitable acts towards the enslaved Africans. He had been known to spend extensive amounts of time caring for injured and sickly slaves upon their arrival in Cartagena. On one occasion having been described as devoting hours to nursing a dying slave back to health.

He built upon Sandoval's teachings, continuing to use African translators to convey religious messages to the enslaved Africans, but also utilizing mnemonics aids to help the enslaved remember the Catholic catechism as they prepared for baptism. With the help of translators, he would encourage the slaves to use their hands to remember content, such as the different sacraments. Claver and his translators would convey the catechism concurrently in Spanish and the slaves' respective language. He also learned a language himself, described as the "language of Angola," in order to communicate with the enslaved.

Claver spent time preaching his mission to crowds of Africans, often providing rewards, such as stamps or medals, to those who were able to answer questions and relay information about doctrine. In support for his beatification, Claver's peers recognized him for his dedication to Christian matrimony of enslaved Africans, many of whom he encouraged to marry.

Similarly to Sandoval's view that the African animist religions were wrong, Claver worked hard to denounce remnants of cultural and spiritual practices that the enslaved engaged in such as ritual dances and other "superstitions" as he described them. He extended much effort to ban animistic spiritual expression.

During the season when fewer slavers at port, he traveled the country, visiting plantations to give spiritual consolation to the slaves. He preached in the city squares, to sailors and traders and conducted country missions, returning every spring to visit those he had baptized, ensuring that they were treated humanely. During these missions, he tried to avoid the hospitality of planters and overseers. Instead, he lived in the same quarters as the slaves.

Claver's work on behalf of the enslaved did not prevent him from ministering to the souls of well-to-do members of society, traders and visitors to Cartagena (including Muslims and English Protestants) and condemned criminals, many of whom he spiritually prepared for death. He was also a frequent visitor at the city's hospitals. Through years of unremitting toil and the force of his own unique personality, the slaves' condition slowly improved. In time he became a moral force, the Apostle of Cartagena.

== Illness, and death ==
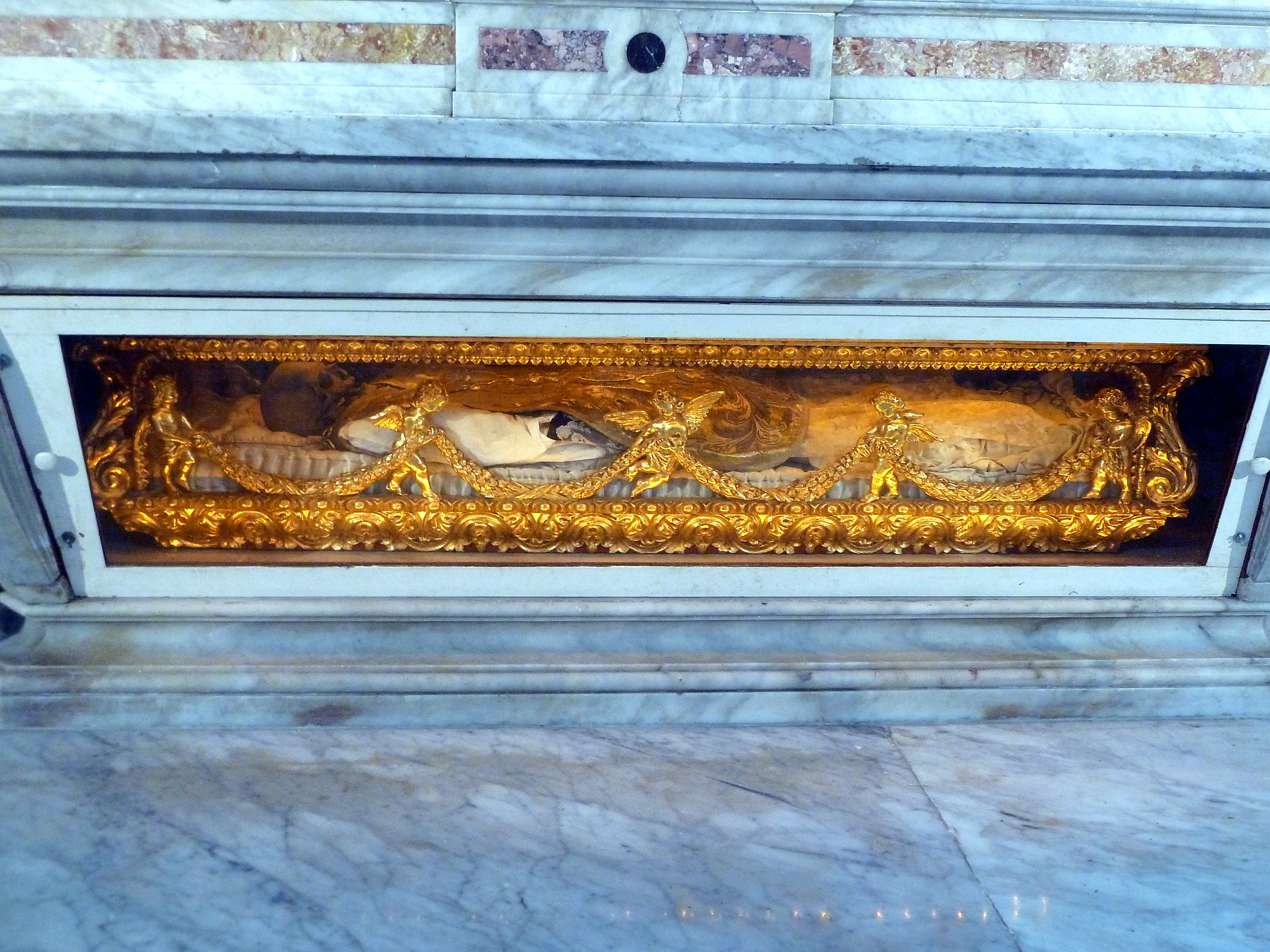
The bones of Claver under an altar at the Church of St. Peter Claver in Cartagena

In the last years of his life Peter was too ill to leave his room. He lingered for four years, largely forgotten and neglected, physically abused and starved by an ex-slave who had been hired by the Superior of the house to care for him. He never complained about his treatment, accepting it as a just punishment for his sins. He died on 8 September 1654.

When the news of his death spread in Cartagena, many came to his room to pay their last respects. Such was his reputation for holiness that the room was stripped bare as pilgrims absconded with relics. He was given an extensive public funeral.

== Legacy ==
Claver was canonized in 1888 by Pope Leo XIII, along with the Jesuit porter, Alphonsus Rodriguez. In 1896, Pope Leo also declared Claver the patron of missionary work among all African peoples. His body is preserved and venerated in the church of the Jesuit residence, now renamed in his honor as Iglesia de San Pedro Claver.

"No life, except the life of Christ, has moved me so deeply as that of Peter Claver".

— Pope Leo XIII, on the occasion of the canonization of Peter Claver

Many organizations, missions, parishes, religious congregations, schools and hospitals bear the name of St. Peter Claver and also claim to continue the Mission of Claver as the following:

- The Knights of Peter Claver are the largest African-American Catholic fraternal organization in the United States. In 2006, a unit was established in San Andres, Colombia. The Order was founded in Mobile, Alabama, and is presently headquartered in New Orleans.
- Claver's mission continues today in the work of Stella Maris, formerly known as the Apostleship of the Sea and his inspiration remains among port chaplains and those who visit ships in the name of the church, through Stella Maris.
- The Missionary Sisters of St. Peter Claver are a religious congregation of women dedicated to serving the spiritual and social needs of the poor around the world, particularly in Africa. They were founded in Austria by the Blessed Mary Theresa Ledóchowska in 1894.
- Among the many parishes dedicated to St. Peter Claver are those in Lexington, Kentucky, West Hartford, Connecticut, Macon, Georgia, New Orleans, Louisiana, Simi Valley, California, Saint Paul, Minnesota, Sheboygan, Wisconsin, Montclair, New Jersey, Baltimore, Maryland, Huntington, West Virginia, Punta Gorda, Belize, and Nairobi, Kenya.
- Among the many schools dedicated to St. Peter Claver are those in Decatur, Georgia, and Pimville, South Africa. The oldest African American school in the Diocese of Saint Petersburg, and the oldest African American school still functioning in the State of Florida, is the St. Peter Claver Catholic School.

The Congress of the Republic of Colombia declared September 9 as the Human Rights national Day in his honor.

His canonization caused angst among some due to his own slaveholding and treatment of slaves (including corporal punishment), and it is alleged that these matters may have initially stalled his canonization. Katie Grimes takes the view that the way the church celebrates Peter Claver as “the saint of the slave trade” would uphold anti-blackness much more than it undermines it. However, the sources cited by Grimes in her criticism stated that Claver allowed uncommon freedom for the slaves he purchased (using them in his ministry rather than for hard labor), and resorted to physical punishment solely to prevent what he saw as immoral behavior.

== See also ==
- Louis Bertrand
- Mary Theresa Ledóchowska
- Saint Peter Claver, patron saint archive
