= Castillo Marroquín =

Palace in Chía, Cundinamarca, Colombia

- Chia, Cundinamarca, Colombia
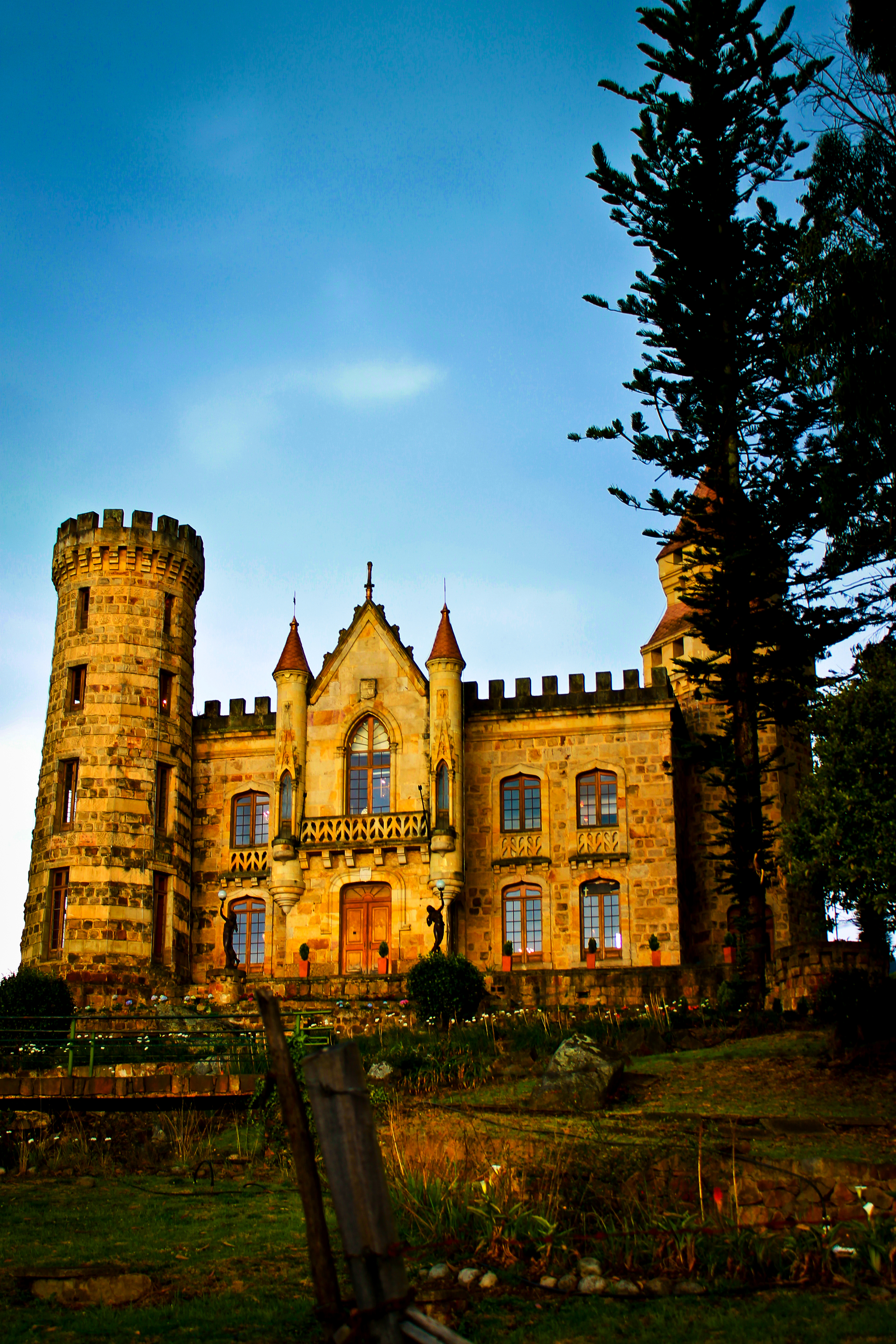
- Castillo Marroquín

Site information
- Type: Château, Residential
- Owner: National Pedagogic University (Colombia)
- Open to the public: Yes

Location
- Location of the Castillo Marroqín within Colombia
- Coordinates: 4.862575°N 74.025908°W
- Height: 4 floors

Site history
- Built: 1898
- Built by: Gastón Lelarge
- In use: 1898–present
- Materials: Stone

Castillo Marroquín (Marroquín Castle) is a palace built in 1898, located on the grounds of the Hacienda El Castillo in the La Caro sector in Chía, Cundinamarca, Colombia. It owes its name to the fact that it is located on the land that was part of the estate of former president José Manuel Marroquín.

== History ==
It was designed and built in 1898 by the French-Colombian architect Gastón Lelarge, commissioned by Lorenzo Marroquín Osorio. At that time, it had residential use. However, since it was sold by the Marroquín family, it has had various uses. This castle was the presidential house during the Thousand Days' War and where the sale of Panama was negotiated, has been, in one hundred years, a refuge for politicians, ambassadors, novelists and oil magnates. But also large transformers. In 1952 it was saved from the ruins by the surgeon, Roberto Restrepo.

== Chronology ==
- from 1889 Marroquín Family (Descendants of José Manuel Marroquín)
- from 1952 Roberto Restrepo (Writer and surgeon)
- from 1970 Guillermo Villamil (Oil Magnate)
- from 1988 Juan Camilo Zapata Vásquez(Bogotá Cartel Chief)
- from 2005 Colombian State (For Sale)
- from 2024 National Pedagogic University
