= Cartagena Cathedral, Colombia =

Church in Cartagena, Colombia

Coordinates: 10°25′25.1″N 75°33′03.6″W

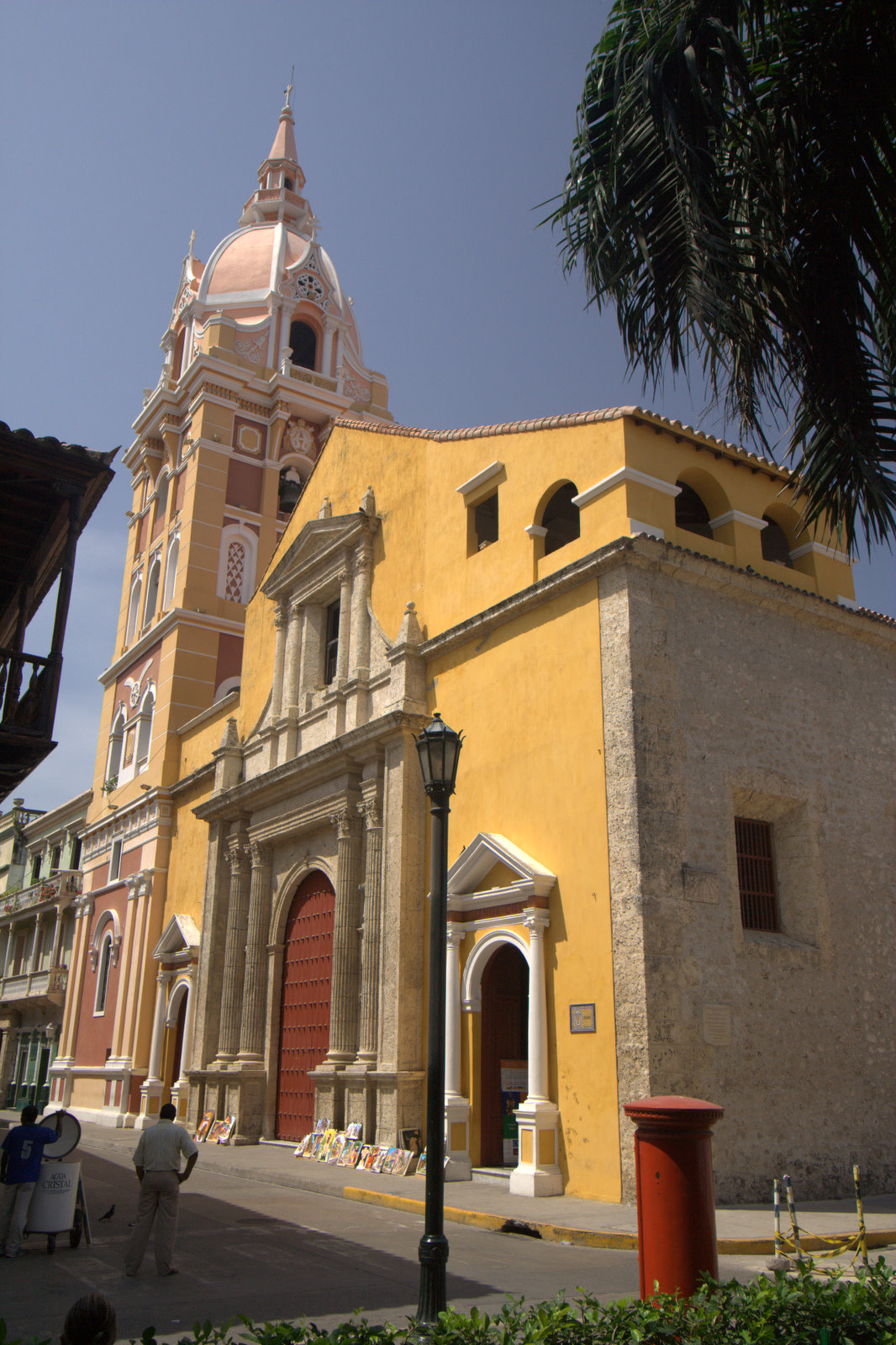
Main facade of the Cathedral of Saint Catherine of Alexandria

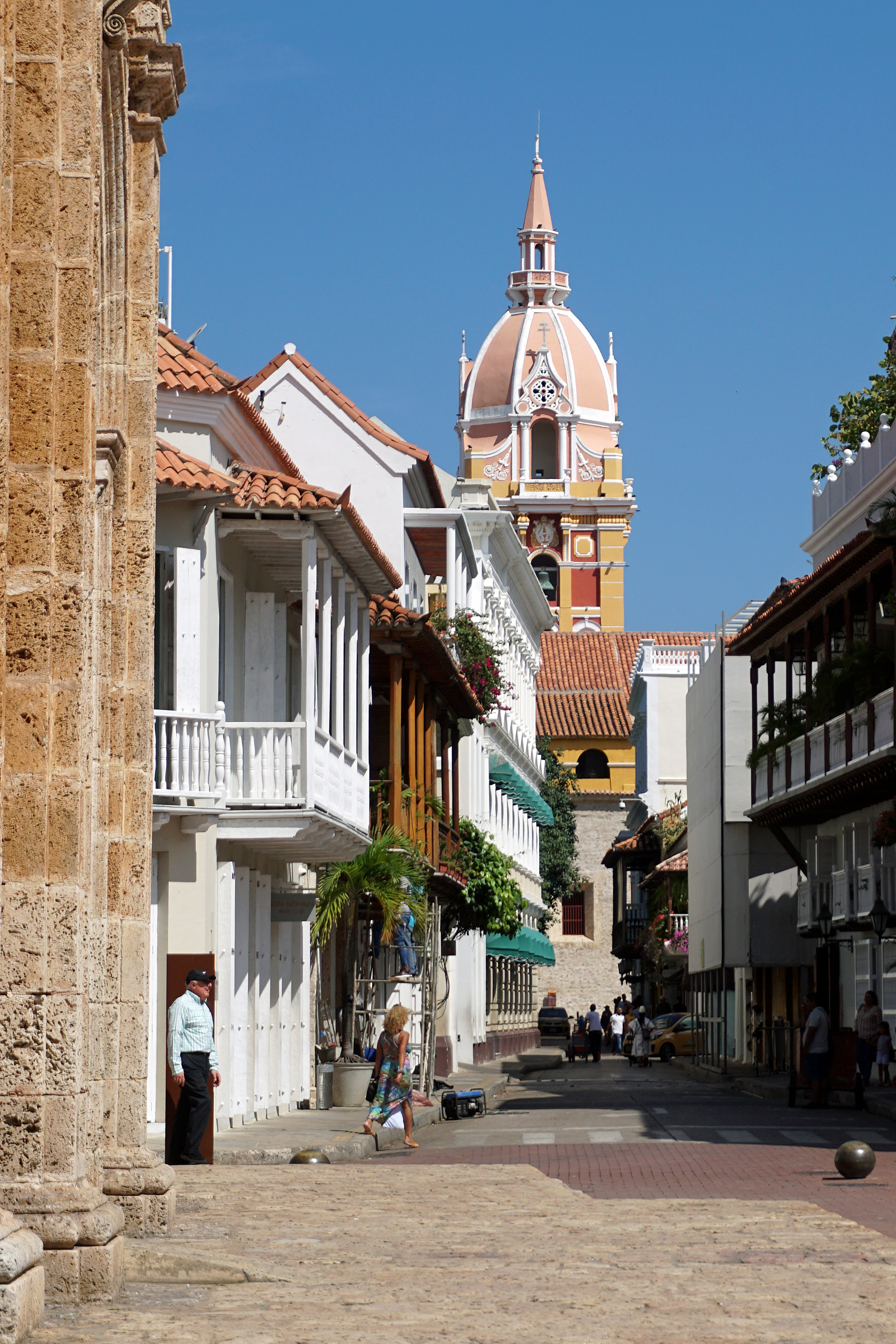
Cathedral's tower and colonial houses

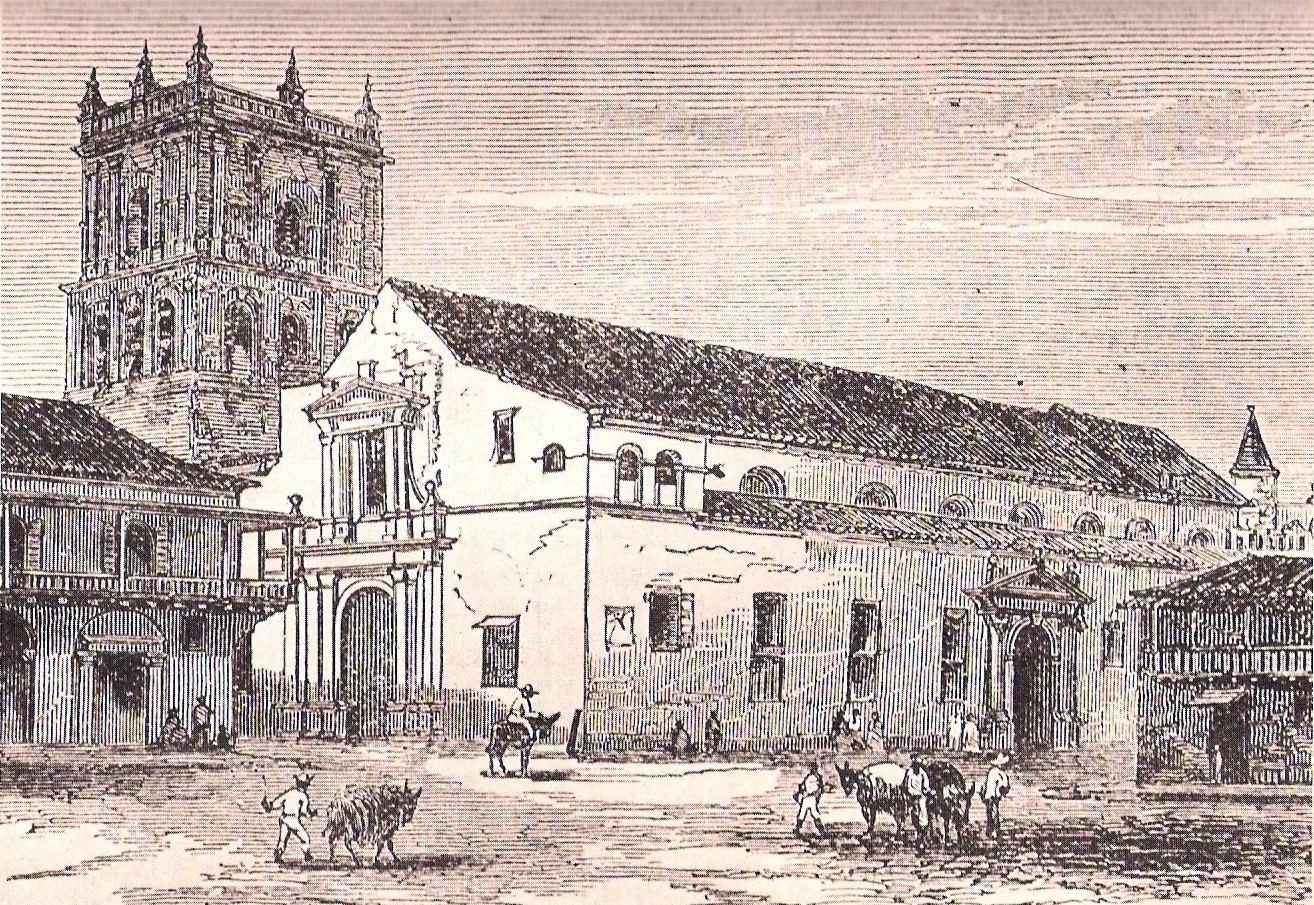
The Cathedral of Cartagena de Indias in 1863. Woodcut taken from La América, illustrated newspaper of New York. Vol I, No. 12. Nov. 1863

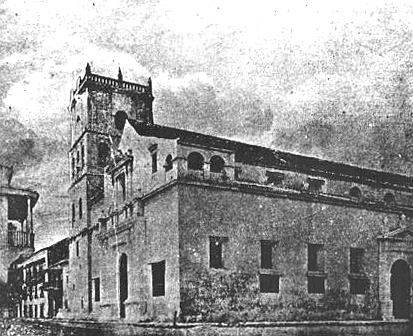
Cathedral of Cartagena in 1900.

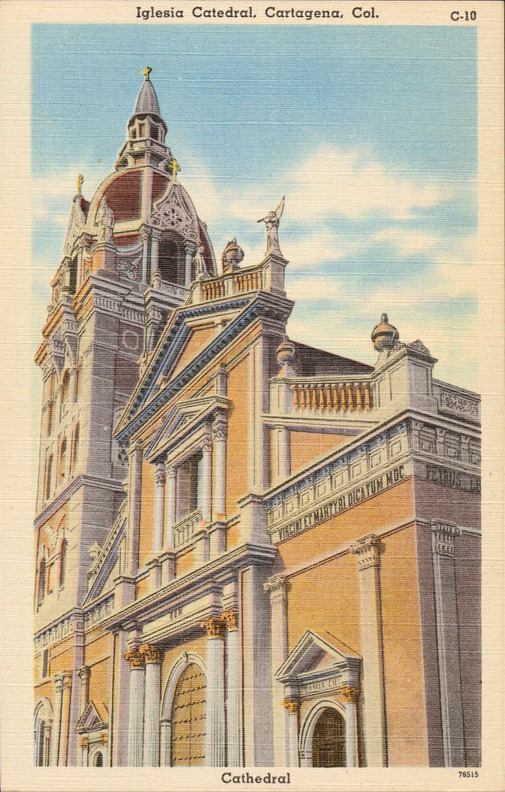
Postal of 1948 of the cathedral. In 1908 the tower and dome of the cathedral were refurbished.

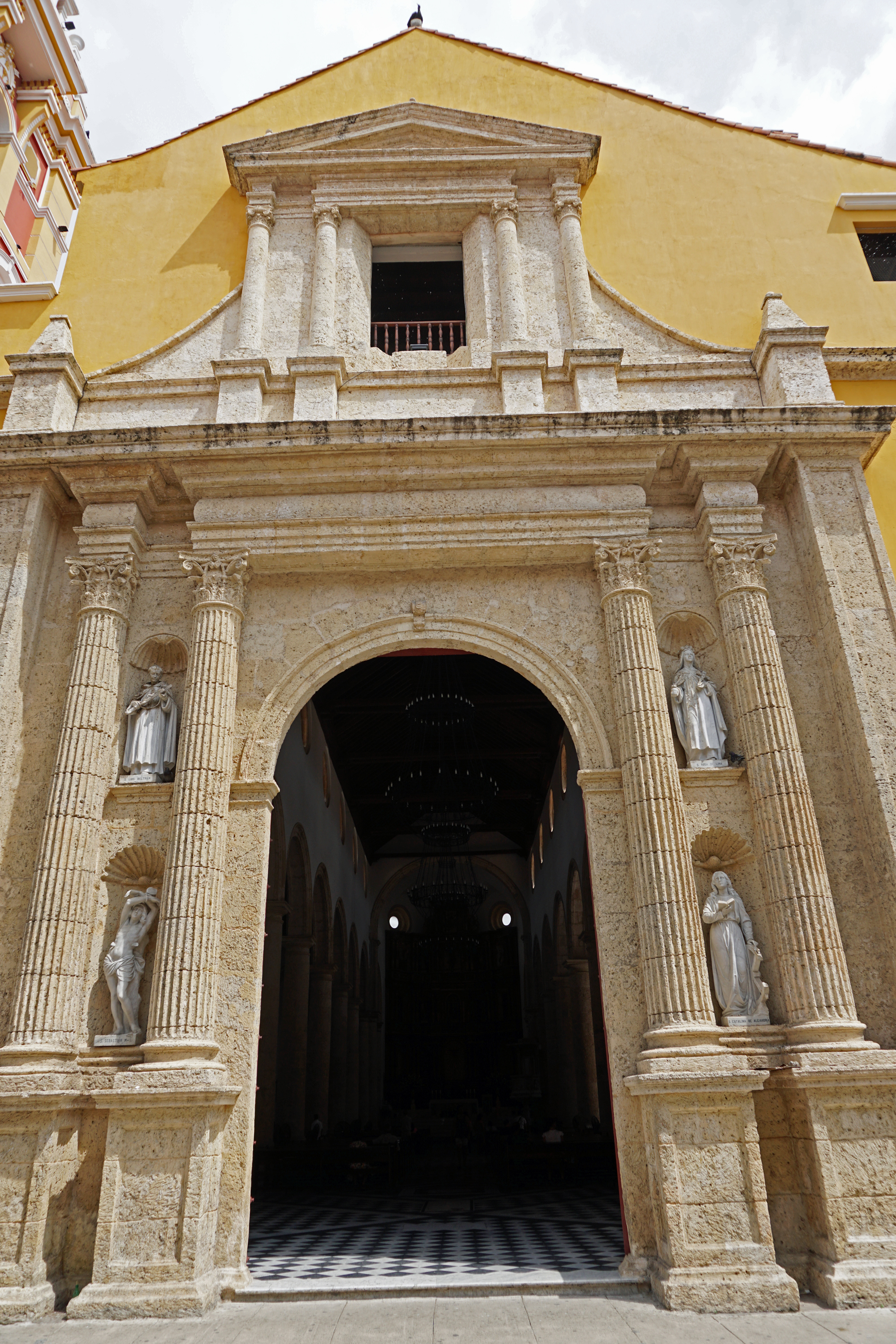
Main portal

The Cathedral of Cartagena de Indias in Colombia, officially the Metropolitan Cathedral Basilica of Saint Catherine of Alexandria (Spanish: Catedral Basílica Metropolitana de Santa Catalina de Alejandría) is located in the historic centre of Cartagena. It is the episcopal see of the Archbishop of Cartagena de Indias, one of the oldest episcopal sees in the Americas. The cathedral is dedicated to Saint Catherine of Alexandria.

The Cartagena de Indias Cathedral was built between 1577 and 1612, replacing a modest church made of wood and reeds. The original structure of the cathedral has been preserved today almost unchanged. The cathedral was designed by master builder Simón González, modelled after basilicas in Andalusia and the Canary Islands. Later, in 1908, the tower and dome of the cathedral were refurbished by French architect Gaston Lelarge. However, the balconies, the main portal and cornices are original from the colonial era. In 1586, while the church was still under construction, it was attacked by the English privateer Francis Drake, which caused severe damage and delayed its completion.

Both the Carrara marble pulpit, the valuable procedural custody, the marble pavement of the cathedral and the elegant arcades sustaining the central nave, are due to the prelate Fray José Díaz de Lamadrid, who governed the Cartagena see from 1778 to 1792.

== History ==
The current cathedral concerns the third building built as a cathedral church in the city. The first one was promoted by the Dominican friar Tomás de Toro y Cabrero, first bishop of Cartagena, and who was named by Pope Paul III. The construction of the temple began in 1535, only two years after the founding of the city, and ended in 1537. It was a humble construction of "thatched roof and reeds", and was located in the block that is behind the present cathedral, with front on the street calle del Coliseo. The life of this building was short, for in 1552 a fire consumed much of the city and in ruins, the cathedral was converted. In its replacement, between 1563 and 1568, the construction of the second cathedral temple was carried out, realized in wood and of thatched ceiling, because were difficult times and it did not have many resources, but was more solid than the previous one. From this second temple, a modest trace is preserved in the General Archive of the Indies and a physical remnant of its bulrush.

Pedro Fernández de Busto, governor of the city, notably the promoter of the architectural works that were carried out at that time and who also undertook the task of carrying out important projects in the urban area, such as the drying and sanitation of the main entrance of the city, which established the Plaza Real (now the Plaza de la Aduana); the initiation of the works of an aqueduct, which was never completed and would endow the city with running water; The construction of a hospital, and the creation of houses for the administration of justice, the jail and the Cabildo. The idea of granting Cartagena a dignified building that would serve as a cathedral church emerges and is also promoted by himself. In addition, towards 1575 the Dominican friar Dionisio de los Santos arrived as the new bishop, who sends a letter to the King, dated May 25 of that year, where he describes something about the cult in the cathedral, among which he says: "There are no rations or half rations, no choirboys, but a clever sacristan and two sacristan waiters who serve the altar in a T-shirt and zaragüelles, which there is no more. And so this church is served as a sad parish of Spain, "so the sovereign gives immediate order to rebuild it.

In that same year (1575) a public contest was called to select the design of the building, which was presented by the masters Eugenio de la Vega, Hernando Esteban, Juanes Guerra and Simón González The project presented by the latter, was chosen as a "major workman" of the work, a practically supervisory position, with a salary of $50,000 maravedís per year, also indicating a daily of Twenty-two reales for each day he worked in the construction, allowing him to simultaneously exercise that position with the other activities of his office. In turn, Hernando Esteban was commissioned by the Cabildo as immediate director of the traces and Juanes Guerra worked on the project and occupied a prominent position. The stonemason Martín de Marquina was in charge of supplying the stone and also worked as an officer in the work of the stonemasons Pedro de Aguilar, Francisco Ruiz, Juan de Medina and Gaspar Juanes.

The construction of the third Cathedral by the year began in 1575, located far from the port for security reasons, in a corner that faces a narrow street later named "Santos de Piedra", next to the present park Parque de Bolívar; But without facing it, following the model adopted by Nicolás de Ovando in Santo Domingo and the old and strong tradition of the church surrounded, in time, by the most outstanding constructions of the city, as they are the headquarters of the civil power and the houses of the most important personages.

In 1577, when the foundation was still being worked on, it was discussed in the Cabildo the feasibility of changing its orientation and turning its axis ninety degrees, as proposed by regidor and captain Sebastián Pérez. The councilors were in agreement with the proposal, they noticed that it would be better, but for that, it was necessary to acquire properties and the Cabildo did not have extra funds to buy them. So, Captain Pérez offered to donate 200 pesos for this purpose, but that amount was not enough, so the governor met with the neighbors (among whom a contribution from each other had been made to finance the work), and as everyone voted to continue the work as it was initiated, the cabildo decided for this, in addition, the Governor indicated that it was not possible to make a new contribution from each other to acquire the houses, since the king only authorized it to do it only to pay the work. It is thus that the idea of turning the project was discarded and the work continued as it was planned.

The work continued actively, because, a year later, "five arches to be made in the chapel are already to begin on the pillars that are made". Master González, seeing the little strength and firmness of the stone, decided to add another support for the ceiling and modified in full gear the original design that was of six pairs of columns, which remained of seven pairs. During the course of the work some doubts were generated about the material of the arches and the height of the main nave in relation to the main chapel, but it was always heard and respected the point of view of the author of the design: The arches are built in stone, and the main nave of the same height as the main chapel.

In 1579, more than half of the walls were at the level of the mark and the remaining part was at a height of five walls. In that same year, it was named after the new bishop Friar Juan de Montalvo. Already for 1585, ten years after the work began, it is stated that the volume of the building was covered and, although the neighboring buildings and tower were missing, the work was practically finished.

=== Drake attack ===
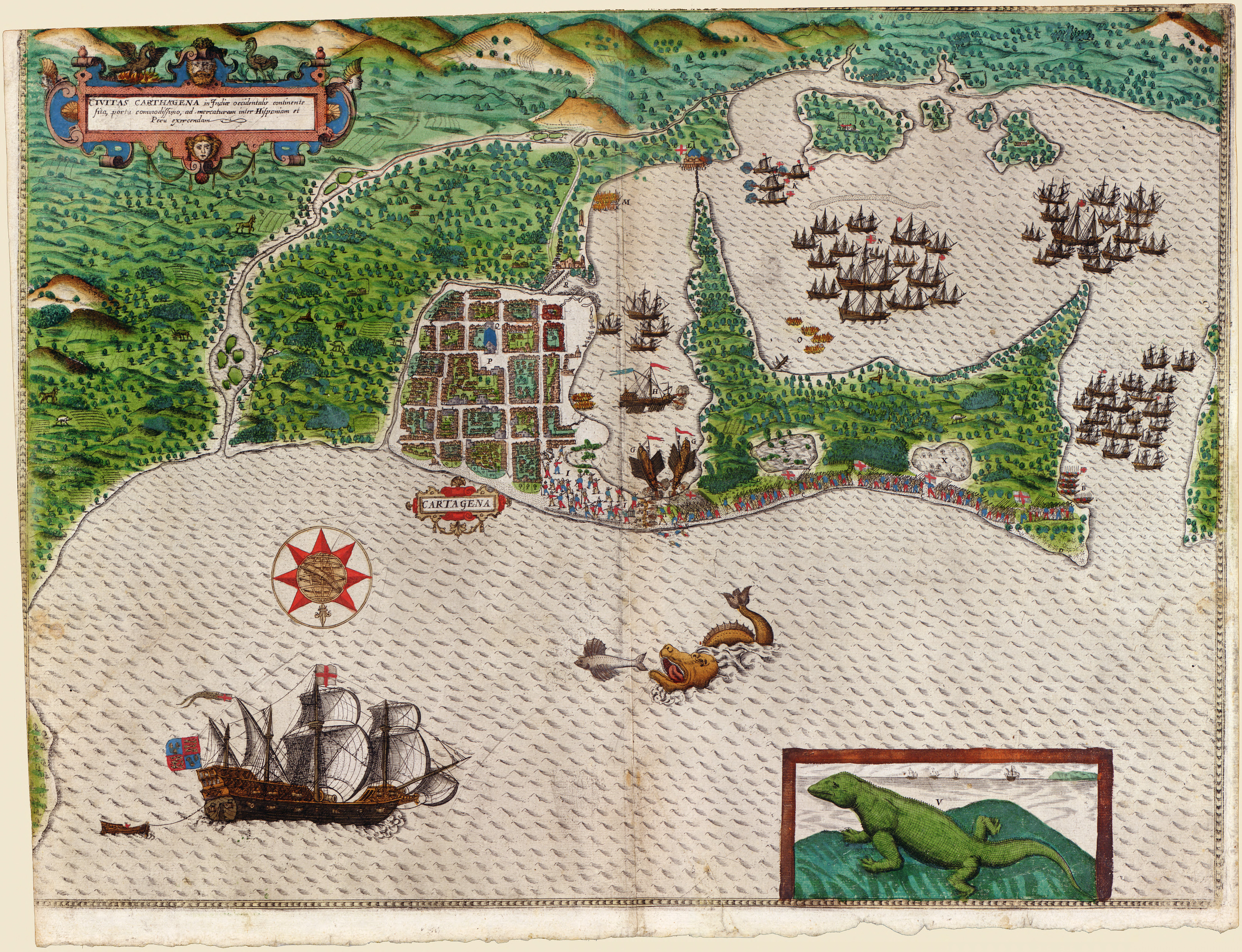
Map of the Drake fleet in Cartagena

Nevertheless, the following year (1586), the English pirate, Francis Drake, "El Draque", appeared before the coasts of Cartagena with a fleet of up to 23 ships of war and more than 3,000 men, and attacked the city, in one of the most important military actions carried out in the 16th century against the ports of the Americas. Cartagena was taken and Drake was devoted to looting: It reduced to ashes a little more than half of the city and, before the refusal of its inhabitants to pay the juicy ransom that demanded, threatened to demolish to cannonades the cathedral, that at that moment had to be the most precious good of the city. Then he made the first warning shot, which was enough to seriously affect its structure, as the bullet struck one of the columns, knocking it down and taking two more. Arches that supported the three columns and part of the ceiling. Finally, the Cartagenians paid 110,000 silver ducats and Drake agreed not to continue the destruction of the city, after having it in its possession for 6 weeks.

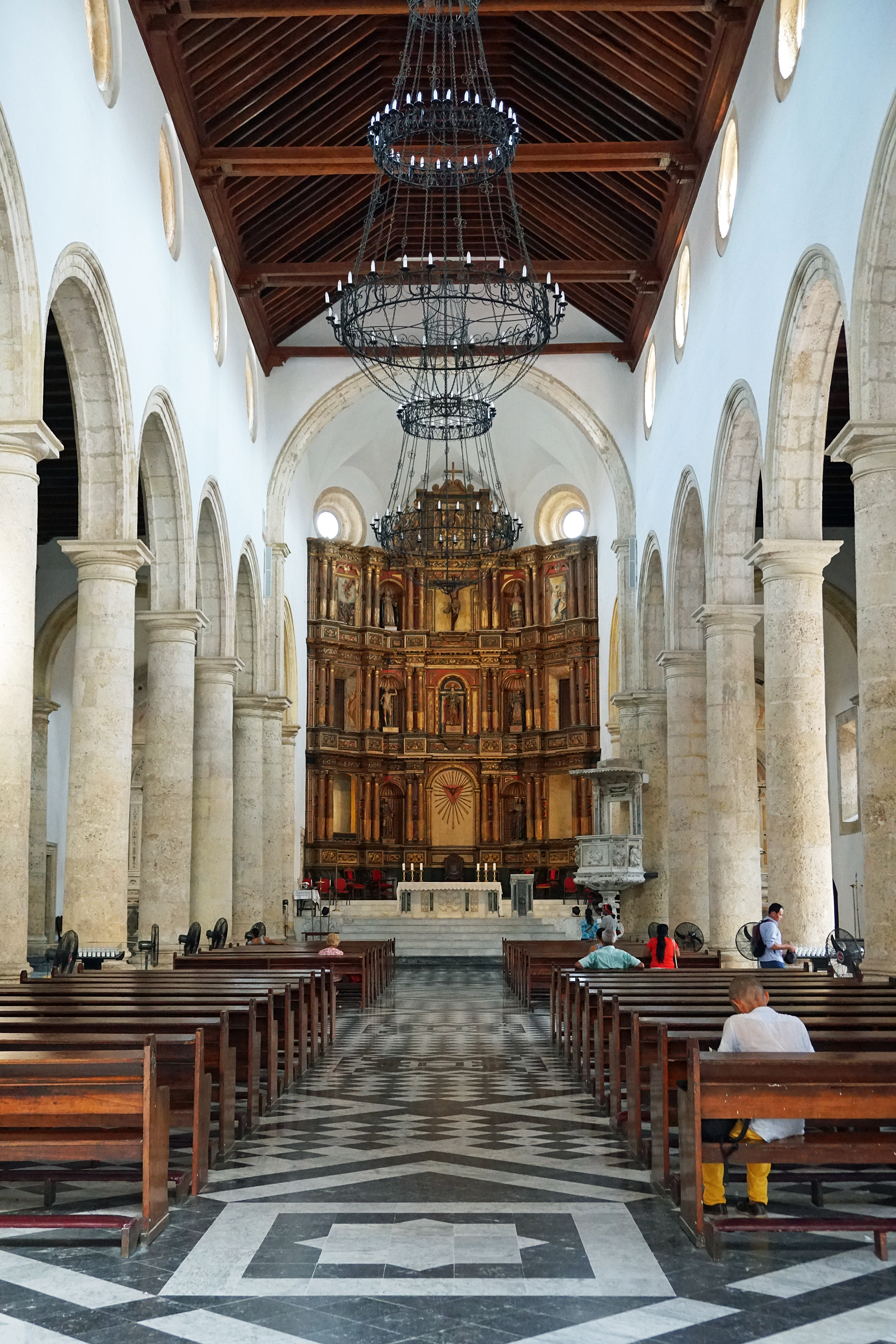
Central nave.

Fortuitously and coincidentally, on the way to Quito, the master Benito de Morales passed through the city, who, at the request of the governor, examined the cathedral and evaluated the damage suffered. In this way, he verified the good foundation of the walls and columns, gave indications for the reconstruction and recommended that the building be completed in such a way that the original project was not changed. Thus, slowly because of the lack of money that the British took and that was destined to the project, the repair works and completion of the temple began. In addition, after the attack and looting of the city, Bishop Friar Juan de Montalvo died the September 10, 1586, of moral penalty after the demolition of his cathedral.

The works of repair and termination passed very slowly. In 1591, the bishop Friar Antonio de Hervías wrote a letter to the king, in which it said:

This work goes very long with having been able to finish the damage that Drake did in space of a year, and to walk in six years that the damage was done and now closely to be finished and God knows when it is finished, With very great detriment of the edified that is destroyed everything with the waters and with much offense of those that we enter in the church raining all it and they do not take advantage of prayers and warnings, take advantage of the money and to spend itself in salaries of majors and on shelves and it is not done nothing"

The letter of Bishop Friar Antonio de Hervías addressed to the king is transcribed with the writing of that time, in addition some words have the spelling of that moment.

Notwithstanding the pessimism of the bishop (reflecting the frequent enmity between the military and ecclesiastical authorities of the colony), reconstruction was undertaken, albeit slowly; in spite of the good desire of the governor, had not advanced much, since no funds were available since the city was very bad economically after the attack of the Drake.

== See also ==
- List of colonial buildings in Cartagena, Colombia
