= Guaymaral Airport =

Guaymaral Airport Chia-Guaymaral Airport
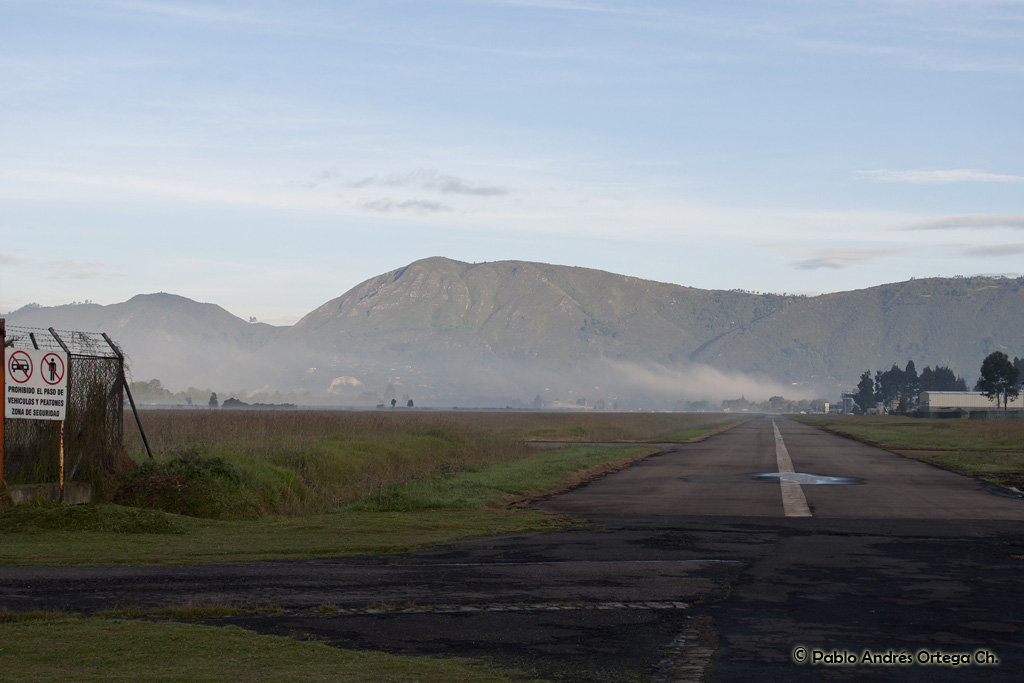
- IATA: none; ICAO: SKGY; LID: GMY

Summary
- Airport type: Civil, Military
- Operator: Colombian government
- Serves: Chía, Bogotá, Colombia
- Elevation AMSL: 8,390 ft / 2,557 m
- Coordinates: 4°48′45″N 74°03′55″W
- Website: www.aerocivil.gov.co

Map
- Location of the airport in Colombia

Runways
Direction	Length		Surface
Direction	m	ft	Surface
11L/29R	1,720	5,643	Asphalt
11R/29L	1,920	6,299	Grass
- Sources: GCM SkyVector

Guaymaral Airport (ICAO: SKGY) is a high-elevation airport in the north of Bogotá, Colombia, also serving the towns of Cota and Chía. The runway is 15 kilometres (9.3 mi) northeast of Bogota's El Dorado International Airport.

== Overview ==
The airport primarily handles general aviation, flight school and executive flights traffic. It is the base for private and commercial pilot training schools Aeroandes and Aeroclub de Colombia. There are hills east and west of the airport. The parallel grass Runway 11R/29L is the longer, but is unmarked.

== See also ==
- Transport in Colombia
- List of airports in Colombia
