= Alonso de Sandoval =

Spanish Jesuit priest and missionary in Colombia

The Reverend Alonso de Sandoval SJ
- Born: 7 December 1576; Seville, Spain
- Died: 25 December 1652 (aged 76); Cartagena, Colombia
- Occupations: Priest, Missionary.

Alonso de Sandoval, SJ (7 December 1576 - 25 December 1652) was a Spanish Jesuit priest and missionary in Colombia. He devoted most of his life to the evangelization of Black slaves arriving in the Colombian port city of Cartagena, and was the mentor of Saint Peter Claver. He is also known for his treatise De Instauranda Æthiopum Salute, a major contribution to the study of the slave trade and the condition of Black slaves in Cartagena.

== Life ==
Sandoval was born in Seville in 1576. He followed his parents who emigrated to Peru, where his father was appointed accountant at the Royal Treasury of Lima. He studied there, initially at the seminary of Saint Martin. On 30 June 1595 he entered the Lima novitiate of the Society of Jesus.

In 1605, he joined the Jesuit college that had just been founded in Cartagena, and spent the rest of his life there except for a brief stay in Lima from 1617 to 1619.

He himself called his lifetime service the ministerio de los morenos, ministry of the Blacks. He had come to realize that most of the black slaves who landed by the hundreds in the port of Cartagena were forcibly baptized before receiving any religious instruction. The apostolate he led to them for 45 years enabled Father Sandoval to personally baptize forty thousand blacks.

Before leaving for Lima in 1617, he trained Peter Claver to take over, and was later Peter's mentor and advisor. During his stay in Lima, he began to collect documentation and bibliography on Africa, compiling both accounts of ancient writers and studies of other Jesuit fathers. He died aged 76 in Cartagena.

== De Instauranda Æthiopum Salute ==
During his stay in Lima, Sandoval began to write his work Naturaleza, policia sagrada y profana, costumbres y ritos, disciplina y catecismo evangélico de todos etíopes, which he completed in 1623. The work was printed in Seville in 1627. A second edition in 1647 came with the Latin title De Instauranda Æthiopum Salute.

Both the title and the conception of the book seem to have been inspired by the work of another Jesuit, José de Acosta, whose De Procuranda Indorum Salute was published in Salamanca in 1589. In that treatise on evangelization in America with considerations on the indigenous peoples of Peru, Acosta posits that the success of the missionary depends on his capacity to be flexible, pragmatic and adaptable in his relations with future converts. Sandoval followed Acosta's example in his missionary manual.

In the four books of De Instauranda Æthiopum Salute, Sandoval presented the available historical and geographical knowledge on the African world, a description of the suffering of slaves with an admonition to cruel owners, a practical guide for Jesuit missionaries, completed by a call to the Jesuits to serve with Africans in America.

De Instauranda is considered one of the most important texts for the ethnography of African slavery in Iberian America, along with the works of the Portuguese Jesuits António Vieira (1608-1697) and Jorge Benci (1650-1708).

== Ministry to the enslaved ==
Prior to Sandoval's landing in Cartagena, there was a recognized problem amongst missionaries and other religious workers that the newly arriving enslaved Africans were being baptized with little to no understanding of the Catholic doctrine or Christian ideals. After being sold, an overwhelming percentage of slave masters not only were indifferent to allowing any religious involvement such as confession or attendance of mass for their slaves, but many were staunchly opposed to it. This prevented any opportunity slaves may have had at religious development.

Being significantly concerned about these circumstances, Sandoval dedicated himself to the mission of educating enslaved Africans on the Catholic doctrine, and to baptizing and converting them upon their arrival on slave ships in Cartagena. He spent years determining the best methodology in which to use to catechize these slaves, which he later outlined in his published work De Instauranda Æthiopum Salute. In addition to being influenced by Jesuit José de Acosta's publication, Sandoval was greatly inspired by Acosta's notion of the importance of involving Africans in religious practices and sects, rather than allowing their spiritual lives to cease after their baptism. Although he wanted to promote this continuation of spirituality, there was still a strong opposition to blacks taking on any important roles within the Church and they were often prohibited from entering certain religious institutions.

In his publication of De Instauranda Æthiopum Salute, he outlines the importance of this missionary work to the Africans, dismissing fellow Jesuits' commonly used excuses for not dedicating themselves to this project, such as a lack of time, other priorities, or concern about no longer being respected by social elites. He was known to be adamantly opposed to very harsh treatment of African slaves, but still believed that the system of slavery was a fundamental fact of life. Many of his Jesuit peers were slaveholders themselves despite their engagement with and aid to the enslaved.

Sandoval's goal in his catechism to the slaves was for them to develop an understanding of the sin inherent within them as well as to motivate them to live a life consistent with the Catholic ideals. The Jesuit placed a momentous emphasis on the importance of black translators to his ministry work. In his publication, he instructs other Jesuits and priests working with enslaved Africans to be prepared to spend ample time in search of translators to aid in their own missionary efforts. During Sandoval's delivery of the catechism, he would speak in Spanish to the arriving Africans and one of his black translators would speak to the slaves in their own language concurrently.

Sandoval classified newly arrived Africans who had not yet been taught the Catholic catechism as bozales and Christian Africans as ladinos whom he viewed as being more civilized. He frequently made note of cultural and spiritual practices that the Africans would engage in, which he generally viewed as being heretical in nature. Additionally, Sandoval recognized the vast number of African languages as well as the many differences between them. However, despite this recognition of variation, he still tended to categorize them as being a part of what he called "the cursed sect of Muhammed" or within the Muslim religion which he condemned as well.

== See also ==
- Bartolomé de las Casas
