= Gastón Lelarge =

French-Colombian architect (1755–1831)

- Born: Gastón Eugène Lelarge; October 12, 1861; Rouen, France
- Died: August 9, 1934 (aged 72); Cartagena, Bolívar, Colombia
- Education: Académie des Beaux-Arts
- Occupation: Architect
- Buildings: The Casa de Nariño; National Capitol; Cartagena Cathedral; Teatro de Cristóbal Colón; Castillo Marroquín

Gastón Eugène Lelarge (October 12, 1861 – August 9, 1934) was a French architect and writer responsible for much of the neoclassical constructions in Colombia. He designed the Casa de Nariño, the official residence of the President of Colombia.

== Biography ==
Gastón Charles Raphaël Julien Lelarge was born on October 12, 1816, in the town of Rouen, France, son of the Norman painter Raphaël Lelarge. He began his architectural studies early at the Académie des Beaux-Arts and served as Charles Garnier's assistant during the construction of the Paris Opera.
