= Brian Allen (art historian) =

British art historian (born 1952)

Brian Francis Allen (born October 1952) is Chairman of the Hazlitt Group that includes the art dealership Hazlitt, Gooden and Fox and Arnold Wiggins and Sons, the leading dealers in historic picture frames.

He was Director of Studies at the Paul Mellon Centre for Studies in British Art between 1993 and 2012. He is a specialist in 17th- and 18th-century British art and has written widely on this subject area. He has organised a number of exhibitions in collaboration with the Yale Center for British Art, the State Hermitage Museum and the State Kremlin Museums. A past Chairman of the National Art Collections Fund he was a Trustee of the National Portrait Gallery between 2012 and 2015, the Holburne Museum of Art, the Strawberry Hill Collections Trust, the British Sporting Art Trust and is a trustee of the Hermitage Foundation UK and the Ben Uri Gallery.

== Publications ==
Books:

- Allen, Brian (28 February 1995). Towards a Modern Art World. London: Paul Mellon Centre for Studies in British Art, Yale University Press. ISBN 9780300063806.
- Allen, Brian (5 November 1996). British Art Treasures from Russian Imperial Collections in the Hermitage. London: Paul Mellon Centre for Studies in British Art, Yale University Press. ISBN 9780300069464.
- Allen, Brian (2010). The Paul Mellon Centre for Studies in British Art: A History 1970–2010. London: Paul Mellon Centre for Studies in British Art, Yale University Press. ISBN 9780300175714.

== Academic Posts ==
Academic offices
Preceded by Michael Kitson 1985–1995, Christopher White 1973–1985, Ellis K. Waterhouse 1970–1973	Brian Allen, Director of Studies Paul Mellon Centre for Studies in British Art; 1993–2012	Succeeded by Mark Hallett 2012 –
