= Mark Hallett (art historian) =

British art historian

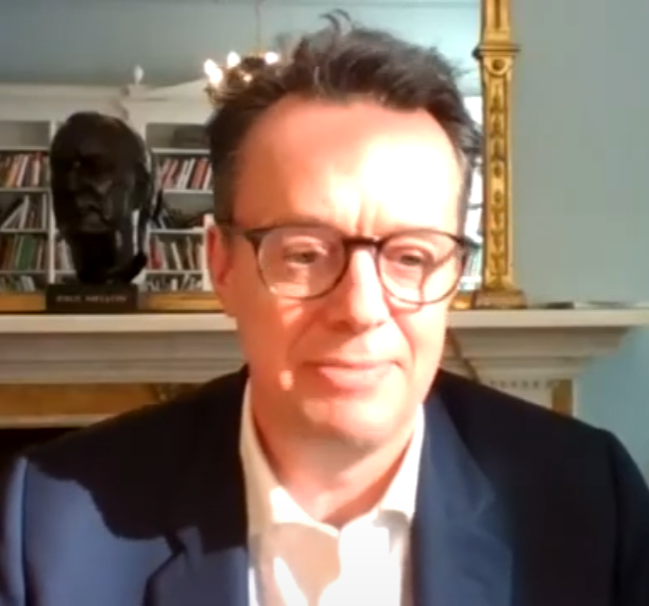
- In a Paul Mellon Centre video in 2021
- Born: Mark Louis Hallett; 11 March 1965 (age 61)
- Education: University of Cambridge; Courtauld Institute of Art
- Occupation: Art historian

Mark Louis Hallett (born 11 March 1965) is a Welsh art historian specialising in the history of British art. He is the Märit Rausing Director of the Courtauld Institute of Art.

== Career ==
Hallett, who grew up in mid-Wales, attended his local secondary school in Tregaron, Cardiganshire. He studied for his undergraduate degree at Pembroke College, Cambridge, graduating from the University of Cambridge in 1986, and studied for a master's degree (1989) and a PhD (1996) at the Courtauld Institute of Art. He was an Andrew W. Mellon Fellow at Yale University in 1990–1991.

Having been appointed lecturer in 1994, he spent 18 years teaching history of art at the University of York, where he was made a professor in 2006. He was head of the History of Art department at York between 2007 and 2012, and a member of the University's Centre for Eighteenth Century Studies.

Hallett was appointed director of studies at the Paul Mellon Centre for Studies in British Art in October 2012. In this role, he oversaw a major expansion of the Centre's premises, personnel, activities and remit. Under his leadership, the Centre became known for supporting and publishing research on British art and architecture of all periods, having previously been distinguished by its primary focus on the art of the Georgian era. In this same period, the Centre became recognised for its pioneering forms of online publication, its transformative support of the British Art Network, its expanded learning and events programme, and its ambitious in-house research projects. During his time as director, Hallett has also oversaw the launch of a succession of new funding streams within the Centre's Grants and Fellowships programme. These have included two rounds of Research Continuity Grants, which were designed to sustain art-historical research during the Covid-19 pandemic, and the continuing New Narratives initiative, which is intended to support the development of a more diverse range of scholarly voices in the field of British art studies.

As an art historian, Hallett is best known for his writings on eighteenth-century graphic satire, exhibition culture and portraiture, and for his books and catalogues on the artists William Hogarth and Joshua Reynolds. He also co-edited and contributed to the major online publication, The Royal Academy Summer Exhibition: A Chronicle, 1769–2018 (Paul Mellon Centre, 2018). More recently, he has been working on modern and contemporary British art, and has published on figures such as Michael Andrews and Frank Auerbach. He has also become involved in making films about different aspects of British art, and is currently working on a film project devoted to The Procession, by the contemporary artist Hew Locke.

Hallett has also been involved in curating numerous major exhibitions, including James Gillray: The Art of Caricature (Tate Britain, 2001); Joshua Reynolds: The Creation of Celebrity (Tate Britain, 2005); Hogarth (Tate Britain, 2007); William Etty: Art and Controversy (York Art Gallery, 2011); Joshua Reynolds: Experiments in Paint (Wallace Collection, 2015); The Great Spectacle: 250 Years of the Summer Exhibition (Royal Academy, 2018); and George Shaw: A Corner of a Foreign Field (Yale Center for British Art, 2018). In 2019, he co-curated the Tate Britain Spotlight Display Vital Fragments: Nigel Henderson and the Art of Collage.

Hallett has been a visiting scholar at the University of Cambridge and at the Courtauld Institute of Art. He gave the 2011 Watson Gordon lecture at the Scottish National Gallery and the 2019 Aspects of Art lecture at the British Academy.

In 2021, he was appointed a member of the Reviewing Committee for the Export of Works of Art and Objects of Cultural Interest.

== Publications ==
=== Books and catalogues ===
- The Spectacle of Difference: Graphic Satire in the Age of Hogarth, Yale University Press, 1999
- Hogarth, Phaidon Press, 2000
- Eighteenth Century York: Culture, Space and Society, ed. with Jane Rendall, Borthwick Institute, 2003
- Hogarth (co-authored with Christine Riding), Tate Publishing, 2007
- William Etty: Art and Controversy (ed. with Sarah Burnage and Laura Turner), Philip Wilson Publishers, 2011
- Faces in a Library: 'Sir Joshua Reynolds's 'Streatham Worthies' (The Watson Gordon Lecture 2011), National Galleries of Scotland, 2012
- Living with the Royal Academy: Artistic Ideals and Experiences in England, 1769-1848 (ed. with Sarah Monks and John Barrel)l, Ashgate, 2013
- Reynolds: Portraiture in Action, Yale University Press, 2014
- Joshua Reynolds: Experiments in Paint (edited with Lucy Davis), The Wallace Collection, 2015
- Court, Country, City: Essays on British Art and Architecture, 1660–1735 (co-edited with Martin Myrone and Nigel Llewellyn), Yale University Press, 2016
- The Great Spectacle: 250 Years of the Royal Academy Summer Exhibition (co-authored with Sarah Turner), Royal Academy Publishing, 2018
- George Shaw: A Corner of a Foreign Field (ed.), Yale University Press, 2018
- Frank Auerbach: Drawings of People (co-edited with Catherine Lampert), Paul Mellon Centre, 2022

=== Online publications ===
- The Royal Academy Summer Exhibition: A Chronicle, 1769–2018 (co-editor) Paul Mellon Centre, 2018

=== Films and recorded lectures ===
- Vital Fragments: Nigel Henderson and the Art of Collage, 12 short films made with Rosie Ram and Jon Law, Paul Mellon Centre, 2019
- Making an Impact: Thomas Lawrence's Arthur Atherley (1792), Paul Mellon Centre, 2020
- Displaying the Hero: John Singleton Copley's The Death of Major Peirson (1784), Paul Mellon Centre, 2020
- Walking the Streets: William Hogarth's The Four Times of Day (1736-8), Paul Mellon Centre, 2020
- The Original: William Hogarth's A Harlot's Progress (1732), made with Jon Law, Paul Mellon Centre, 2021
- The Sequel: William Hogarth's A Rake's Progress (1733-5), made with Jon Law, Paul Mellon Centre, 2021

=== Articles and essays ===
- "Framing the Modern City: Canaletto's Images of London", in Michael Liversidge and Jane Farrington (eds.), Canaletto and England, Birmingham Museums and Art Gallery, 1993
- "The Medley Print in Early Eighteenth-Century London", in Art History, Vol 20, no. 2, June 1997
- "Painting: Exhibitions, Audiences, Critics, 1780–1830", in An Oxford Companion to the Romantic Age: British Culture 1776-1832, edited by Iain McCalman, Oxford University Press, 1999
- "Manly Satire: William Hogarth's A Rake's Progress" in Bernadette Fort and Angela Rosenthal (eds.), The Other Hogarth: The Aesthetics of Difference, Princeton University Press, 2001.
- "James Gillray and the Language of Graphic Satire", in Richard Godfrey (ed.) Gillray and the Art of Caricature, Tate Gallery Publications, 2001.
- "The Business of Criticism: the Press and the Royal Academy Exhibition in Eighteenth-Century London" in David Solkin (ed.) Art on the line: the Royal Academy Exhibitions at Somerset House 1780-1836, Yale University Press, 2001.
- "The view across the City: William Hogarth and the visual culture of eighteenth-century London" in David Bindman, Frederic Ogee and Peter Wagner (eds.), Hogarth: Representing Nature's Machines, Manchester University Press, 2001.
- "From Out of the Shadows: Sir Joshua Reynolds' Captain Robert Orme", in Visual Culture in Britain, Vol. 5, No. 2, 2004
- "Reading the Walls: Pictorial Dialogue at the British Royal Academy", in Eighteenth-Century Studies, vol. 37, no. 4 (2004)
- "Reynolds, Celebrity and the Exhibition Space", and numerous catalogue entries, in Martin Postle (ed) Joshua Reynolds: The Creation of Celebrity, Tate Publishing, 2005
- "A monument to intimacy: Joshua Reynolds's The Marlborough Family", in Art History, Vol.31, no. 5, 2008
- "Cornucopia: Royal Female Portraiture and the Imperatives of Reproduction" (co-authored with Cassandra Albinson), in Joanna Marschner (ed.), Enlightened Princesses: Caroline, Augusta, Charlotte, and the Shaping of the Modern World, Yale University Press, 2017
- "A Double Capacity: Gainsborough at the Summer Exhibition", in Christoph Vogtherr (ed.), Thomas Gainsborough: The Modern Landscape, Hamburger Kunstalle, 2018
- "The newspaper man: Michael Andrews and the art of painted collage", The Journal of the British Academy, volume 8 (2020)

Academic offices
Preceded by Brian Allen	Director Paul Mellon Centre for Studies in British Art; 2012 to 2023	Incumbent

Academic offices
Preceded by Deborah Swallow	Director of The Courtauld Institute of Art; 2023 to present	Incumbent
