= Orlando Echeverri Benedetti =

Colombian writer and translator

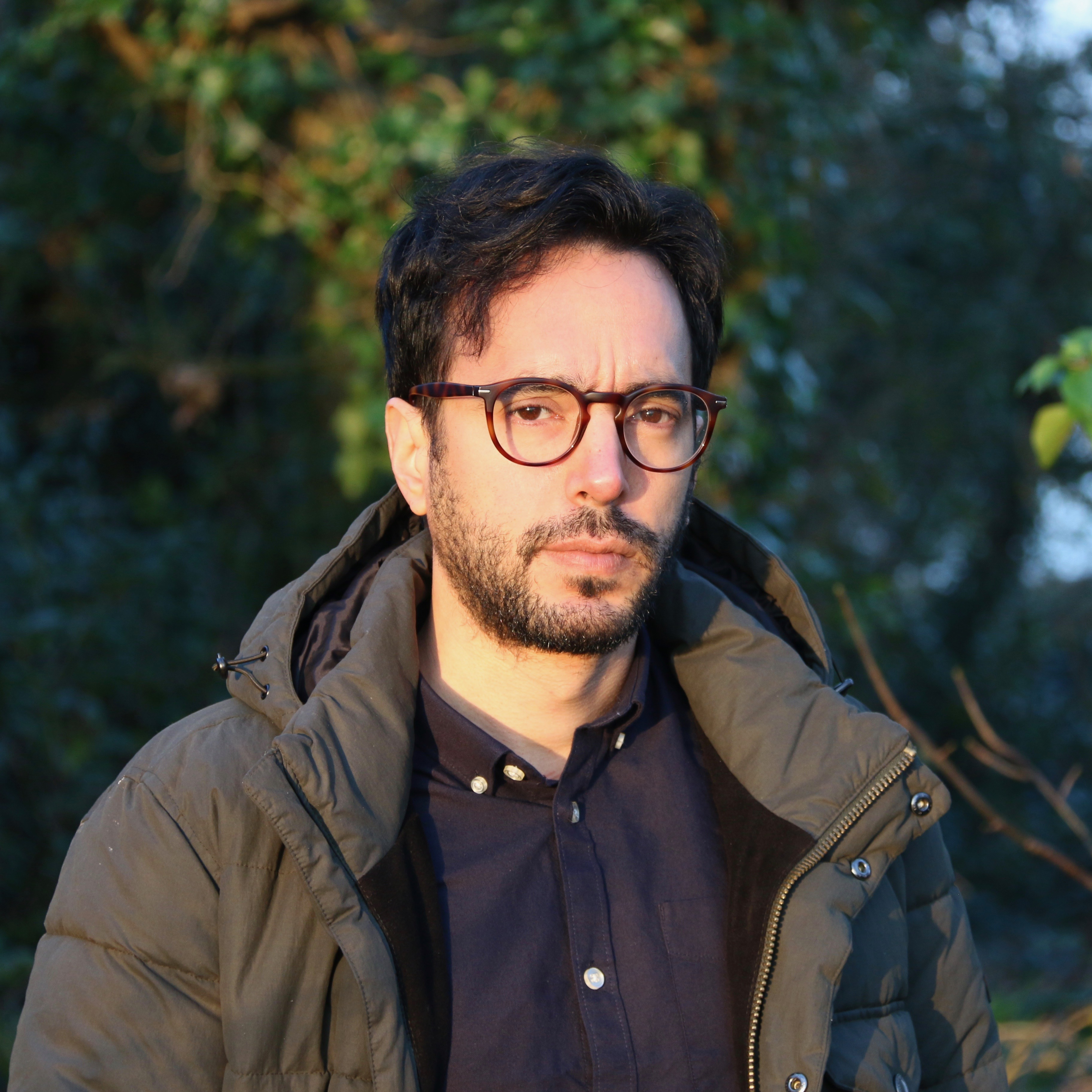
- Born: October 26, 1980 (age 45); Cartagena, Colombia
- Citizenship: Colombian, Spanish
- Occupations: Writer, translator
- Writing career
- Genres: Novel, short story, essay
- Notable work: Criacuervo

Orlando Echeverri Benedetti (born October 26, 1980) is a Colombian writer and translator.

Echeverri was born in Cartagena. He has a bachelor's degree in philosophy from the University of Cartagena and a master's degree in journalism from Torcuato di Tella University. His stories and essays have appeared in El Malpensante, Epoché Magazine and Universo Centro, and he has written for the Société Jersiaise, where he worked as a cataloger and curator at its photographic archive.

His first novel, Sin freno por la senda equivocada, won the Premio Nacional de Novela awarded by the Instituto Distrital de las Artes (IDARTES) in 2014. In 2016 it was longlisted for the Colombian Ministry of Culture's novel prize but was not a finalist.

Angosta Editores published his second novel, Criacuervo, in 2017. The magazine Letras Libres considered it one of the most important works of contemporary Spanish American literature. It was a finalist for the Colombian Ministry of Culture's Premio Nacional de Novela in 2018. The novel explores the orphanhood and rootlessness of two German siblings who try to reunite in a Colombian desert.

In 2018 Penguin Random House published his short story collection La fiesta en el cañaveral, and in 2019 IDARTES invited him to take part in Bogotá Contada.

He has translated works by Mark Twain and F. Scott Fitzgerald, and by contemporary authors such as Julianne Pachico and Sergio De La Pava.

== Works ==
=== Novels ===
- Sin freno por la senda equivocada, El Peregrino Ediciones, Bogotá, 2015. ISBN 9789588911182.
- Criacuervo, Angosta Editores, Medellín, 2017. ISBN 9789585965263.
  - Edicola Ediciones (Spanish-language edition), Santiago de Chile, 2017. ISBN 9789569277450.
  - Italian translation by Marta Rota Núñez, Edizioni Arcoiris, 2019. ISBN 9788899538439.

=== Short stories ===
- La fiesta en el cañaveral, Penguin Random House, 2018. ISBN 9789585458611.

=== In anthologies ===
- Puñalada trapera, Rey Naranjo Editores, 2017. ISBN 9789588969473.
- El Coi y otros cuentos, Fundación La Cueva, 2018. ISBN 9789585938588.
- Bogotá contada 7, IDARTES, 2021. ISBN 9789585595507.
- Muchas vidas por vivir, Colombian Ministry of Culture, 2022. ISBN 9791167070630.
- Cuentos y relatos de la literatura colombiana, vol. IV, Fondo de Cultura Económica, 2023. ISBN 9789585197329.

== Awards ==
- Premio Nacional de Novela, IDARTES, Colombia, 2014.
- Premio Nacional de Cuento, IDARTES, Colombia, 2017.

== See also ==
- Angosta Editores
- British Art Network
