= Julia Alexander =

American art historian and curator (1967–2025)

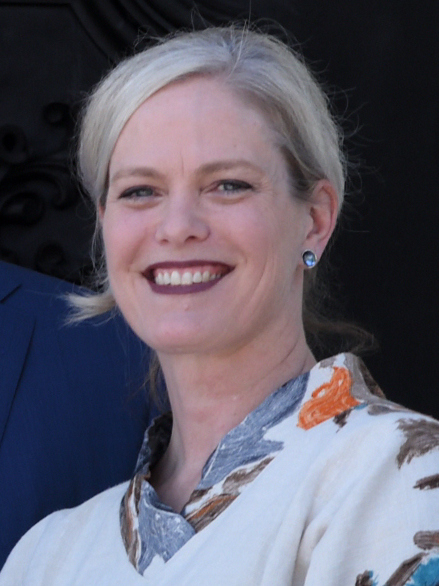
- Alexander in 2018
- Born: Julia Mary Alexander; 1967; Memphis, Tennessee, U.S.
- Died: May 4, 2025 (aged 57–58); Towson, Maryland, U.S.
- Education: Wellesley College (BA); New York University (MA); Yale University (MA, PhD)
- Occupations: Art historian; curator; museum director
- Employer: Walters Art Museum (2013–2024)
- Spouse: John Marciari (m. 1996, separated)
- Children: 2
- Father: David Alexander

Julia Mary Alexander (1967 – May 4, 2025), formerly known by the last name Marciari-Alexander, was an American art historian and curator who was executive director of the Walters Art Museum in Maryland from 2013 to 2024. As director, she oversaw the completion of a seven-year endowment campaign as well as the renovation of the Hackerman House, which holds the museum's collection of Asian art.

Alexander began her career at the Yale Center for British Art, where she was assistant curator of paintings and sculpture and later an associate director of the museum. In 2008, she joined the San Diego Museum of Art as its head curator, and served as an interim director following the departure of the museum director in 2009.

== Early life and education ==
Julia Mary Alexander was born in Memphis, Tennessee, in 1967, the daughter of David and Catharine Alexander. Her father David was president of Pomona College and the American secretary of the Rhodes Trust. Her mother worked at Pomona College as the coordinator of special events.

Alexander grew up in Claremont, California. Her interest in art began in the sixth grade, when she attended Mass at St. Peter's Basilica on a trip to Rome and saw "how architecture and art and life can create these moments of wonder". She attended Wellesley College, where she studied art history and French and became a member of Phi Beta Kappa. She graduated magna cum laude in 1989. As part of a Théodore Rousseau Fellowship offered by the Metropolitan Museum of Art, she studied abroad at New York University in Paris and London and obtained a master's degree in French literature in 1992. She then moved to New Haven, Connecticut, to attend Yale University, where she earned a master's degree and PhD in art history in 1993 and 1999, respectively. Her dissertation considered women's portraiture in Restoration England, and was written under the supervision of Judith Colton.

== Career ==
=== Yale Center for British Art ===
Alexander began her career at the Yale Center for British Art at Yale University in 1996, first as an assistant curator of paintings and sculpture, and later its associate director of programmatic affairs and associate director for exhibitions and publication. Her 2007 exhibition, Howard Hodgkin: Paintings 1992-2007, was named one of Time magazine's ten top museum exhibitions of the year.

=== San Diego Museum of Art ===
In 2008, Alexander returned to California to become the San Diego Museum of Art's deputy director for curatorial affairs. After director Derrick Cartwright left the museum in 2009, Alexander served as one of four co-interim directors of the museum. In 2011, the LA Times highlighted the museum's installation of Thomas Gainsborough and the Modern Woman as one of the ten best California museum shows of the year.

As deputy director, Alexander oversaw the reinstallation of all the museum's public galleries. She also managed a four-year partnership between Balboa Park and the Diamond Neighborhoods communities of San Diego, which resulted in the opening of a community gallery and performing space in 2012.

=== Walters Art Museum ===
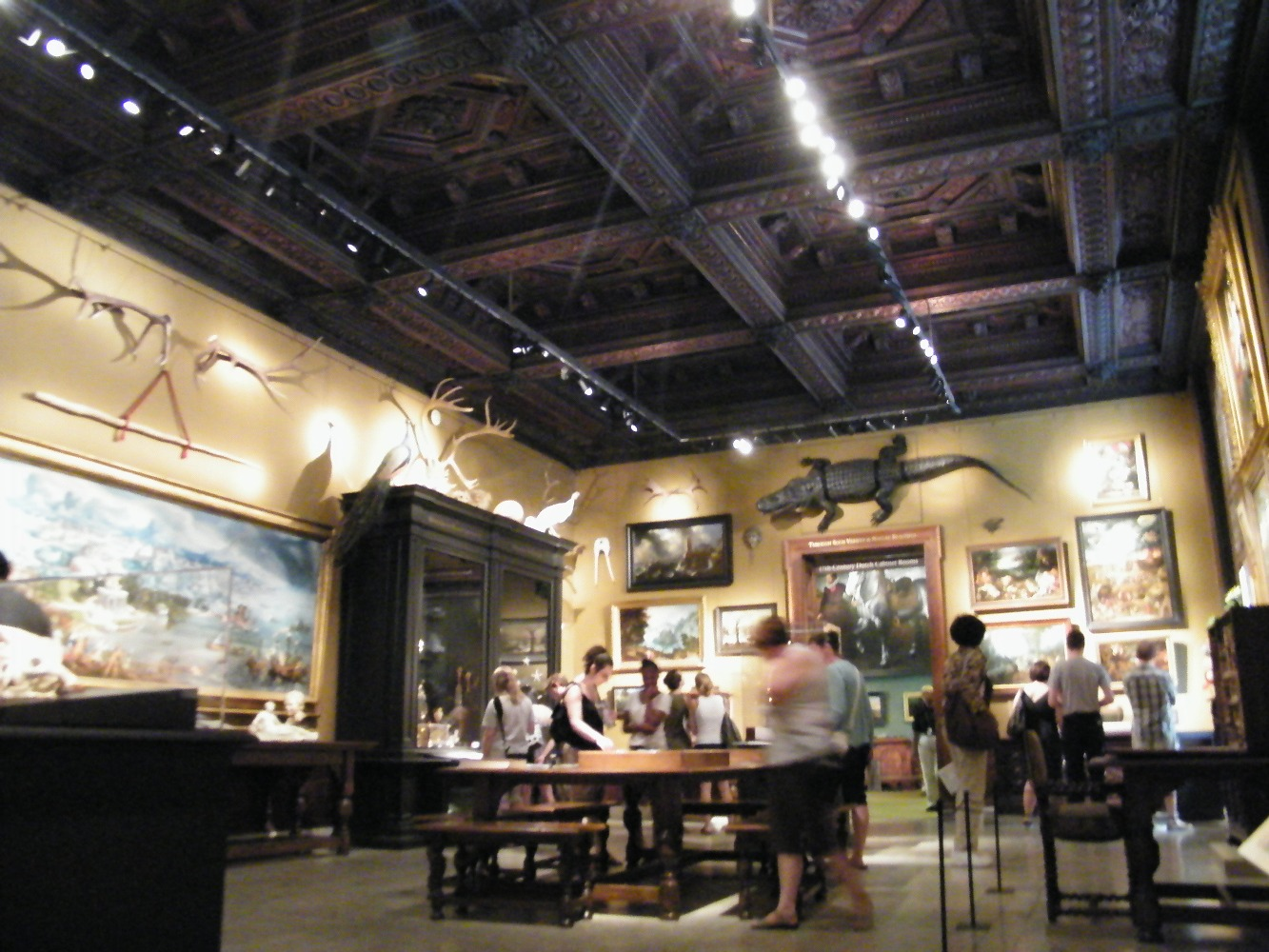
Alexander served as executive director of the Walters Art Museum from 2013 to 2024.

In 2013, Alexander succeeded Gary Vikan as executive director of the Walters Art Museum in Baltimore, Maryland. She was the museum's fifth director and the first woman in the position. The museum is known for its collection of medieval art; Alexander, who had a scholarly background in British art, was also the museum's first non-medievalist director since 1965.

Under Alexander's tenure, in 2015, the museum completed a $30 million endowment campaign started just before the Lehman Brothers went bankrupt in 2008. She later oversaw the restoration and "rethink" of the museum's Hackerman House, which holds its collection of Asian art.

Throughout 2021 and 2022, as a majority of museum staff signed union cards and signaled intention to form an all-inclusive trade union, Alexander refused to recognize the union or meet with the organizing employees. In October 2021, the Baltimore City Council and comptroller of Baltimore issued formal requests to allow for a neutral third-party election, inclusive of all staff. Under advisory from Shawe Rosenthal LLP, Alexander refused to acknowledge the union or meet with her employees. In 2022, mayor of Baltimore Brandon Scott sent Alexander a letter requesting that she allow the employees to hold an independent union election.

Alexander left her position at the museum in the fall of 2024 to lead the Samuel H. Kress Foundation in New York.

== Personal life and death ==
Alexander's former husband is John Marciari; they married in 1996. As of 2018, Marciari headed the drawings and prints department at the Morgan Library & Museum. He previously worked with Alexander as a curator at the San Diego Museum of Art. The couple and their two children previously resided in the Homeland neighborhood of Baltimore. In 2018, one of their children, then in the eighth grade, spoke to Yahoo Lifestyle about living with psoriatic arthritis and speaking at the United Nations on behalf of an organization, NCD Child, which focuses on the rights of youth with or at risk of non-communicable diseases.

Alexander died from a heart attack in Towson, Maryland, on May 4, 2025.
