= Arthur Kauffmann =

British-German art historian and dealer

Arthur I. Kauffmann (June 11, 1887, in Stuttgart – 1983 in London) was a German-British art historian and art dealer.

== Early life ==
Arthur Kauffmann was a son of the merchant Raffaele Kauffmann and Fanny Levy. He studied at the TH Berlin, the University of Erlangen and at the École du Louvre and was awarded his doctorate in 1910 with a dissertation on Giocondo Albertolli in Erlangen. He went to Paris to learn the profession of an art auctioneer at the Hôtel Drouot auction house. Kauffmann was a soldier in World War I and was promoted to battalion commander. Kauffmann joined the art business of the Munich art dealer Hugo Helbing in 1919 and set up the Frankfurt branch at Bockenheimer Landstrasse 8. He became a partner in 1923.

== Family ==
He married Tamara Karp, a doctor from Riga, in 1922. Their son Edgar Alexander "Sascha" Kauffmann became a doctor in England, and their son Claus Michael Kauffmann became an art historian and director of the Courtauld Institute.

== Nazi era persecution and emigration ==
When the Nazis came to power in Germany in 1933, they enacted discriminatory racial laws targeted Jews. Helbing withdrew from the business in 1934, and Kauffmann became the sole owner of the Hugo Helbing auction house. Kauffmann published 51 auction catalogs before 1937. He also worked as a teacher and school councilor at the Philanthropin and as a volunteer at the Frankfurt Jewish Museum.

The gallery's license was not to be renewed in Frankfurt in 1935. After a protest from the local business community over the importance to tourism of the art auctions held at Helbing, Kauffmann was able to continue operating on a limited basis until 1938. In 1938, the owner of the property, Maximilian von Goldschmidt-Rothschild, was forced to sell, and after a renovation by the city of Frankfurt, the traveling exhibition Entartete Kunst (Degenerate Art) made a stop there in the summer of 1939.

Kauffmann and his family emigrated to Great Britain in 1938. Hugo Helbing died in 1938 from injuries inflicted during the November pogroms of 1938.

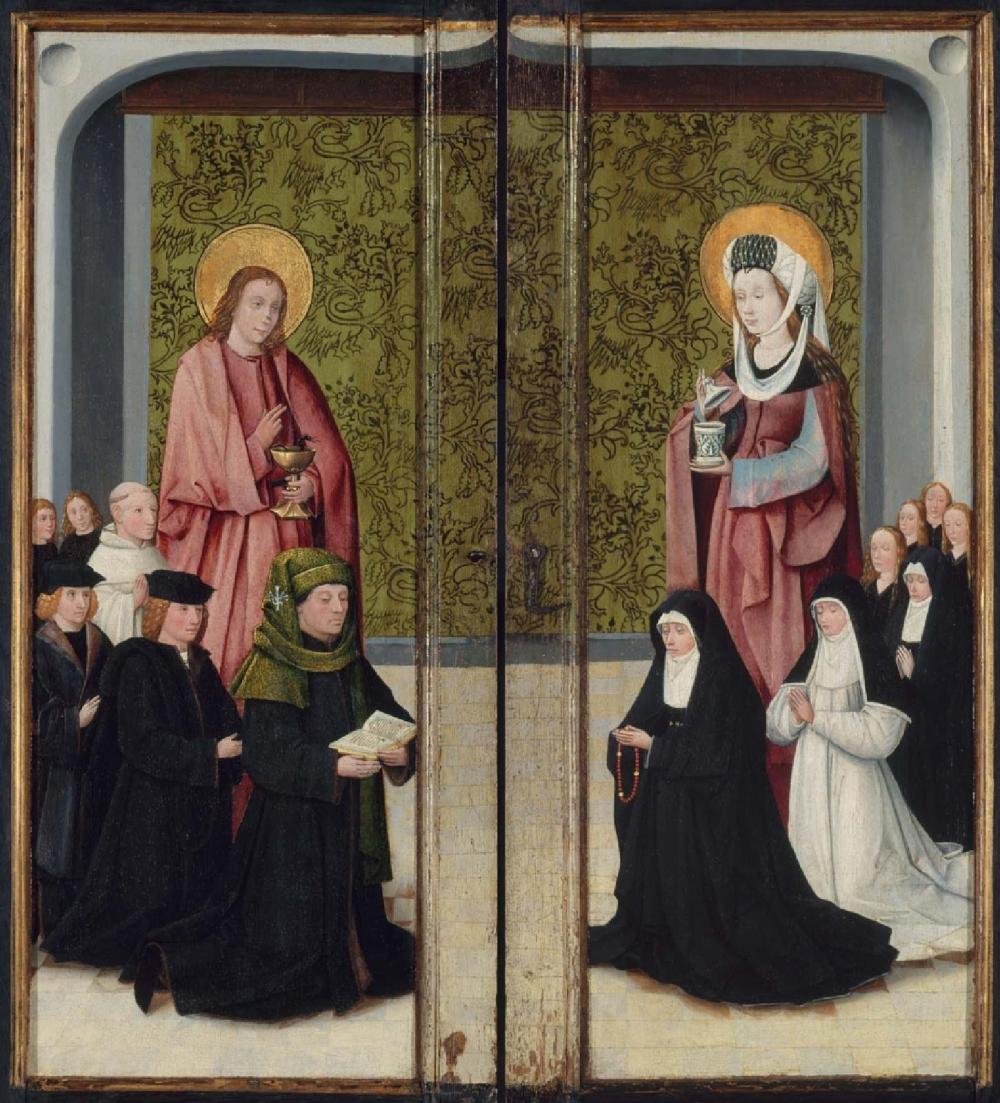
From the workshop of Hieronymus Bosch, from Kauffmann as a gift to Boston

Kauffmann opened a gallery in London's West End in 1939. He received British citizenship in 1947. After the war, he worked as a consultant for private art collectors, advised the Swiss collector Emil Georg Bührle selling him many objects between 1951 and 1956. After Bührle's death in 1956, helped establish the E. G. Bührle Collection Foundation. He donated the side panels of a tryptych from the workshop of Hieronymus Bosch to the Museum of Fine Arts, Boston, in 1956. Kauffmann was a member of the British Antique Dealers' Association and the Oriental Ceramic Society. As an art dealer he supplied artworks to numerous museums.

== Writings (selection) ==
- Giocondo Albertolli der Ornamentiker des italienischen Klassizismus. Heitz, Straßburg 1911. Erlangen, Univ., Diss., 1910
- Ein chinesisches Wirkbild aus der Sammlung Sproesser. In: Der Cicerone, Leipzig. 16 (1924), S. 812–813
- Sammlung Dr. Stefan von Licht, Wien Handzeichnungen und Aquarelle alter und moderner Meister des 16. bis 19. Jahrhunderts. Helbing, Frankfurt am Main 1927.
- Gemälde aus Museumsbesitz, Antiquitäten aus verschiedenem Besitz: Versteigerung: Mittwoch, 24. Juni 1936, vormittags 10 Uhr und nachmittags 3 Uhr, Hugo Helbing, Frankfurt am Main, Kunsthandlung und Kunstversteigerungshaus, Inh. Dr. Arthur Kauffmann, Bockenheimer Landstrasse 8. Hugo Helbing, Frankfurt am Main 1936.
- Kunstbesitz eines Berliner Sammlers: Versteigerung: Dienstag, 23. Juni 1936, vormittags 10 Uhr und nachmittags 3 Uhr. Hugo Helbing, Frankfurt am Main 1936.
- Stiftung Sammlung E. G. Bührle = Foundation E. G. Bührle Collection = Fondation Collection E.G. Bührle. Artemis, Zürich 1971.

== Literature ==
- Kauffmann, Arthur I. In: Ulrike Wendland: Biographisches Handbuch deutschsprachiger Kunsthistoriker im Exil. Leben und Werk der unter dem Nationalsozialismus verfolgten und vertriebenen Wissenschaftler. Saur, München 1999, S. 359f.
- Kauffmann, Arthur I. In: Joseph Walk (Hrsg.): Kurzbiographien zur Geschichte der Juden 1918–1945. Saur, München 1988, ISBN 3-598-10477-4, S. 188.
- Kauffmann, Arthur I. In: Werner Röder; Herbert A. Strauss (Hrsg.): International Biographical Dictionary of Central European Emigrés 1933–1945. Band 2,1. Saur, München 1983, ISBN 3-598-10089-2, S. 604.
- Claus Michael Kauffmann, Edgar Alexander Kauffmann: Arthur Kauffmann (1887–1983). ohne Verlag, Ohne Ort, 2011, 2019. 2 Nachweise bei Bibliotheksverbund Bayern
- Meike Hopp: Kunsthandel im Nationalsozialismus: Adolf Weinmüller in München und Wien. Böhlau, Köln 2012, ISBN 978-3-412-20807-3.
- Wolfram Selig: „Arisierung“ in München, die Vernichtung jüdischer Existenz 1937–1939. Metropol, Berlin 2004, ISBN 3-936411-33-6.
- Ester Tisa Francini: Jüdische Kunsthändler im Nationalsozialismus: Möglichkeiten und Grenzen. In: Andrea Bambi, Axel Drecoll, Andrea Baresel-Brand: Alfred Flechtheim: Raubkunst und Restitution. de Gruyter Oldenbourg, Berlin 2015, ISBN 978-3-11-040484-5, S. 165f.
