= Deborah Swallow =

British art historian

Deborah Anne Swallow CBE (born 27 August 1948) is a British educator, museum curator and academic. From 2004 to 2023, she was the Märit Rausing Director of The Courtauld Institute of Art and its Gallery; she was its first female Director. She previously worked at the University of Cambridge and the Victoria and Albert Museum. Alongside education and curation, she is a proponent of the broadest possible appreciation of art and its histories, and a specialist in Indian art and anthropology.

== Early life and education ==
Swallow was born on 27 August 1948. She was educated as a scholarship student at the Perse School for Girls, a private school in Cambridge, Cambridgeshire. She took her MA in English literature at New Hall, Cambridge (now Murray Edwards College). A year teaching in India was formative for her interest in the arts, culture and religion of the Subcontinent. Returning to Cambridge, she undertook a PhD in social anthropology at Darwin College, based on further fieldwork in Orissa. In 1977, she completed her Doctor of Philosophy degree with a thesis entitled Living Saints and their Devotees: a Study of Guru Cults in Urban Orissa.

== Career ==
Deborah Swallow began her career at the University of Cambridge. From 1974 to 1983, she was an assistant curator at the Museum of Archaeology and Anthropology. She was additionally a lecturer at Girton College, Cambridge, from 1975 to 1980, and a Fellow of Darwin College, Cambridge from 1975 to 1983. In 1983 she joined the Victoria and Albert Museum's Indian department, overseeing the creation of the Nehru Gallery of Art and a series of major exhibitions on the arts of the Subcontinent, before becoming Keeper of a newly formed Asian Department and Director of Collections in 2001.

In 2004, she was appointed Director of The Courtauld Institute of Art. She was appointed professor in 2008. As leader of The Courtauld, Swallow is a champion of Samuel Courtauld's founding vision, summarised as 'art for all'. She is a champion of a fully inclusive form of art history, embracing artistic production from all cultures and eras and promoting broad access for art to be understood and enjoyed by everyone. Throughout her career at The Courtauld, she has sought to open its offer through decolonising the curriculum, outreach programmes, touring loan exhibitions and a commitment to widening participation in higher education and art history. On Tuesday 26 April 2022, Professor Deborah Swallow announced her intention to retire from her directorship of The Courtauld once a suitable replacement had been appointed. Swallow stepped down as Director at the end of July 2023, and was replaced by Mark Hallett.

As educator and scholar, Professor Swallow is active as a speaker, lecturer, specialist advisor and contributor to journals. She is a Fellow of King's College London, a Trustee of Asia House, Trustee of the Helen Hamlyn Trust, founder Trustee of the Nehru Trust for Indian Collections in the V&A, and a former Trustee of Art Fund. She has written and spoken on contemporary art, women in leadership, women collectors and 19th-century colonial art. Her specific research interests are in Indian art from around 1850 to the present with particular interest in Indian textile history and the history of heritage and museums in colonial and post-colonial India. Since 2022 she is the President of the Royal Anthropological Institute of Great Britain and Ireland.

Swallow was appointed Commander of the Order of the British Empire (CBE) in the 2023 Birthday Honours for services to art and education.

== Selected publications ==
- "Production and control in the Indian garment export industry", in E. N. Goody (ed.), From Craft to Industry: the Ethnography of Proto-industrial Cloth Production, Cambridge, Cambridge University Press, 1982, pp. 133–165.
- "The Arts of the Sikh Kingdoms: Collaborating with a Community" (with Eithne Nightingale), in Laura Peers and Alison K Brown (eds.), Museums and Source Communities, Routledge, London, 2003, pp. 55–71.
- "The Victoria & Albert Museum and its Asian Collections", in Louis Mezin (ed.), The Heritage of the East India Companies in European Museums and Public Collections, Cahiers de la Compagnie des Indes, no 5/6, Port Louis, 2000.
- "The India Museum and the British-Indian textile trade in the late nineteenth century", Textile History, 30 (1), 1999, pp. 29–45.
- "Colonial architecture, international exhibitions and official patronage of the Indian artisan", in Tim Barringer and Tom Flynn (eds.), Colonialism and the Object: Empire, Material Culture and the Museum, Routledge, London, pp. 52–67.
- "Curzon's ivory chairs at Kedleston: a puzzle of patronage in Anglo-Indian furniture" (with Amin Jaffer), Apollo (April 1998), pp. 35–39.
- The Arts of India: 1550–1900 (edited with John Guy), London, Victoria and Albert Museum, 1990.

== Academic Posts ==
Academic offices
Preceded by James Cuno	Director of The Courtauld Institute of Art; 2004 to 2023	Succeeded by Mark Hallett 2023 –
