= University of Cartagena =

Public research university in Cartagena, Colombia

- Universidad de Cartagena
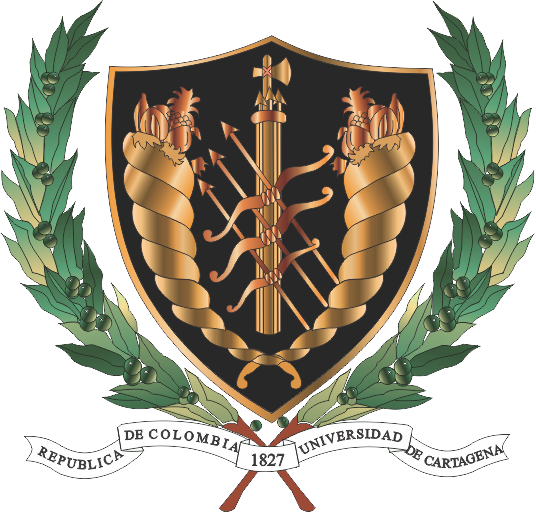
- Other names: UniCartagena
- Motto: Siempre a la altura de los tiempos
- Motto in English: Always at the height of the times
- Type: Public research university
- Established: 1827; 199 years ago
- Academic affiliations: ASCUN, AUIP, SUE
- Location: Cartagena, Bolívar, Colombia; 10.4255339°N 75.5498131°W
- Colors: Black and gold
- Website: unicartagena.edu.co

The University of Cartagena (Spanish: Universidad de Cartagena), also called UniCartagena, is a departmental public coeducational research university based primarily in the city of Cartagena, Bolívar, Colombia. The university offers education at undergraduate and postgraduate levels, including two doctoral programs.

The university is a member of the Association of Colombian Universities, the Iberoamerican Association of Postgraduate Universities, and the State University System (Spanish: Sistema Universitario Estatal). On March 26, 2014, the University of Cartagena received from the Ministry of Education Institutional Accreditation of High Quality, becoming the first and only public university in the Caribbean region with this accreditation.

== History ==
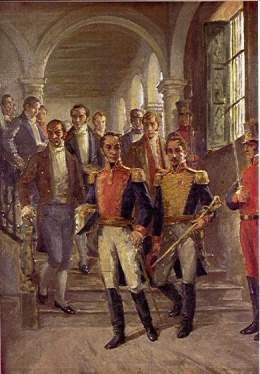
Simón Bolívar and Francisco de Paula Santander, founders of the University of Cartagena

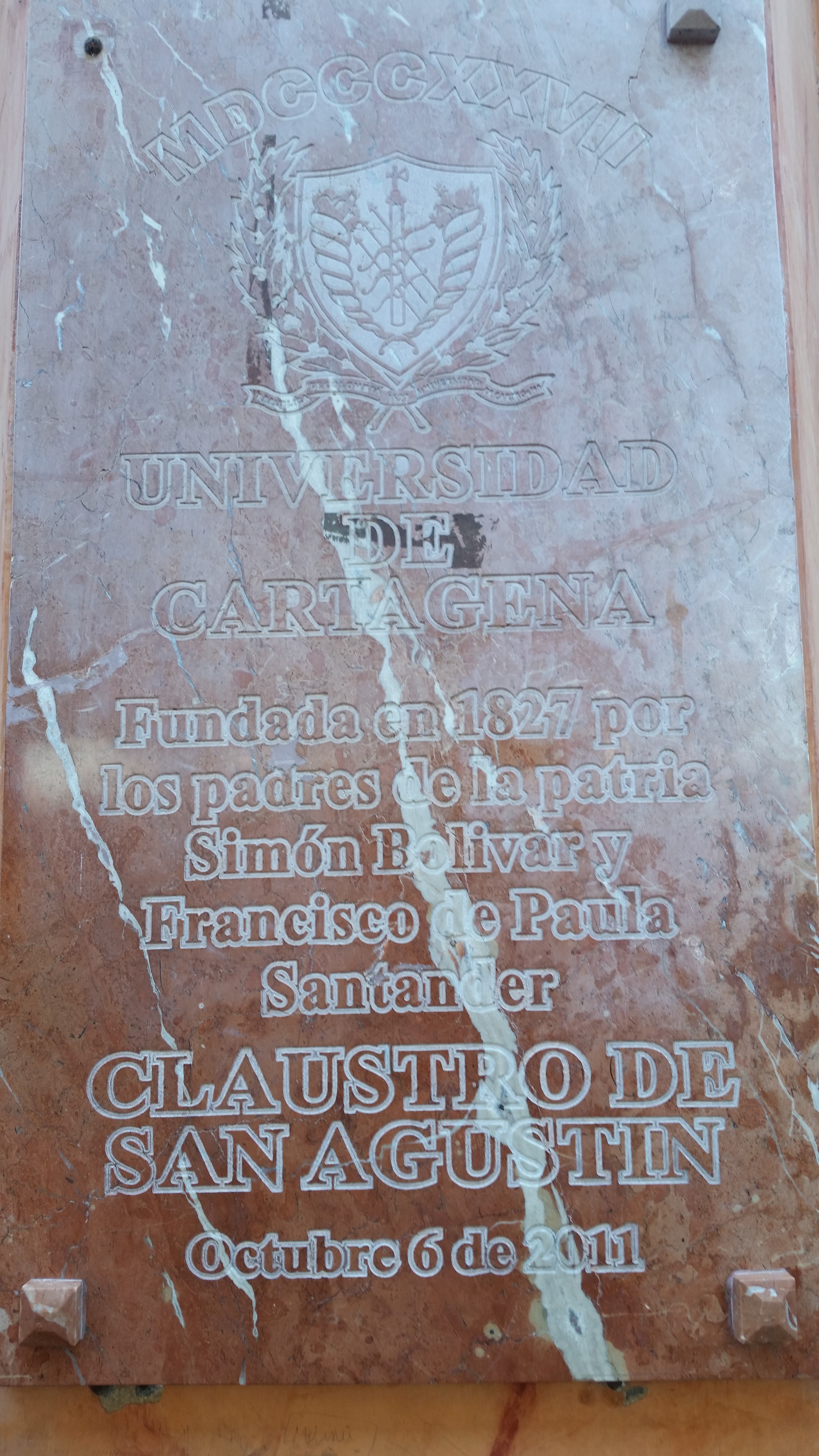
University of Cartagena historical marker

In 1826, General Francisco de Paula Santander's decree cleared the way for the creation of a university in the Caribbean region of Colombia and Cartagena de Indias was chosen as its location. On October 6, 1827, the Liberator Simón Bolívar formalized the establishment of the University of Magdalena and the Isthmus, as Panama was part of Colombia at that time. Subsequently, due to territorial and political changes, the University of Central Magdalena became the University of Cartagena, initially based in the Cloister of St. Augustine, offering only two undergraduate programs: Law and Medicine.

In the 1950s, the current university shield was officially adopted. In 1989, the university inaugurated the Health Campus, relocating the faculties of Medicine, Nursing, Dentistry, and Pharmaceutical Chemistry. In 2001, the Faculty of Science and Engineering moved to the Stone Bolivar Campus, followed by the Faculty of Economics in 2003.

In 1993, the university established distance learning through the Regional Centers for Distance Education (CREAD). The university offers programs in the municipalities of Simití, Santa Rosa del Sur, Carmen de Bolívar, San Estanislao, Turbaco, and San Marcos Magangué.

== Undergraduates ==
- Faculty of Economic Sciences: Economics, Business, Industrial Management, and Accounting
- Faculty of Humanities: Philosophy, History, Linguistics, and Literature
- Faculty of Engineering: Civil Engineering, Food Engineering, Chemical Engineering, and Systems Engineering
- Faculty of Social Sciences: Social Communication, Social Work, and Foreign Languages
- Faculty of Natural Sciences: Mathematics, Biology, Chemistry, and Metrology
- Faculty of Pharmaceutical Sciences: Pharmaceutical Chemistry
- Faculty of Law and Political Science: Law
- School of Nursing: Nursing
- School of Medicine: Medicine
- School of Dentistry: Dentistry
- School of Languages

== Masters ==
Master's degrees are offered in:

- Nursing
- Mathematics
- Chemistry
- Physics
- Education
- Pharmaceutical Sciences
- Environmental Sciences
- Environmental Engineering
- Biochemistry
- Clinical Toxicology
- Microbiology
- Pharmacology
- Clinical Epidemiology and Immunology
- Philosophy

== Other studies ==
The University of Cartagena offers other graduate programs, called specializations in Colombia, which do not lead to a PhD.

== Campus ==
- Zaragocilla Campus (Health Sciences)
- Piedra de Bolívar Campus (Engineering and Economic Sciences)
- Cloister of St. Augustine Campus (Main Campus)
- Cloister of La Merced Campus (Historic town)

== Institutes ==
- Immunologic Research Institute
- International Institute of Caribbean Studies
- Institute of Water and Environmental Sanitation (IHSA)

== Notable alumni ==
=== Politics ===
- Rafael Núñez — Lawyer, President of Colombia
- Justo Arosemena Quesada — Statesman and champion of Panamanian national identity
- Alfonso Múnera Cavadía — Colombian historian, ambassador, and former Secretary General of the Association of Caribbean States.
- Manuel Amador Guerrero — Surgeon, promoted and achieved separation of Panama from Colombia and was the first President of the Republic of Panama

=== Literature and journalism ===
- Gabriel García Márquez — (Undergraduate) Nobel Prize for Literature, 1982
- Luis Carlos López —(Undergraduate) Colombian poet.
- Jorge Artel — Colombian poet, novelist and journalist.
- John Jairo Junieles — Lawyer, poet; winner of the National Literature Award (2002, Bogotá), the International Poetry Prize City of Alajuela (Costa Rica, 2005), and the X International Poetry Prize (2007, Nicolas Guillen)
- Orlando Echeverri Benedetti — Writer, translator, and cultural researcher with a bachelor's degree in Philosophy. Author of the novel Criacuervo and the short story collection La fiesta en el cañaveral.
