= Eric Fernie =

Scottish art historian

Eric Campbell Fernie CBE FRSE FBA FSA (born 9 June 1939, Edinburgh) is a Scottish art historian.

== Education ==
Fernie was educated at the University of the Witwatersrand (BA Hons Fine Arts) and the University of London (Academic Diploma).

== Career ==
Fernie has had a long career in the academic and art worlds, occupying a number of important posts. He was Director of the Courtauld Institute from 1995 to 2003 and was President of the Society of Antiquaries of London from 2004 to 2007.

== Publications ==
- An Introduction to the Communar and Pitcaner Rolls of Norwich Cathedral Priory, 1973. (With A.B. Whittingham)
- The Architecture of the Anglo-Saxons, 1983.
- Medieval Architecture and its Intellectual Context, 1990.
- An Architectural History of Norwich Cathedral, 1993.
- Art History and its Methods, 1995.
- The Architecture of Norman England, 2000.

Academic offices
Preceded by Michael Kauffmann	Director of the Courtauld Institute of Art; 1995 to 2003	Succeeded by James Cuno
