= John Jairo Junieles =

Colombian writer and poet (born 1970)

John Jairo Junieles Acosta (born 26 November 1970) is a Colombian writer and poet. He was born in Since, Colombia and studied at the University of Cartagena and Columbia University in New York. He has written for numerous print and online media outlets. He has also published a dozen volumes of fiction and non-fiction, including poetry, short stories and novels. He has won various awards for his work; in 2007, he was named by Hay Festival Bogota as one of the 39 most promising writers in Latin America under the age of 39 (see Bogota39). He has been translated into multiple languages, including English and French.
