= Martin Myrone =

Tate gallery curator

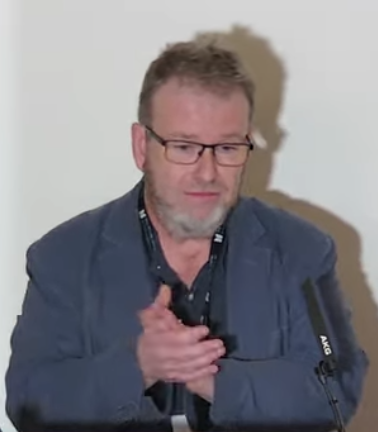
- In a Paul Mellon Centre video in 2024
- Occupations: Art historian, curator

Martin Myrone is a British art historian and curator. He was lead curator of British art to 1800 at the Tate Gallery.

== Selected publications ==
- With Jeff McMillan and Ruth Kenny, British Folk Art, exhibition catalogue, Tate Britain 2014, 144pp.
- John Martin: Apocalypse, exhibition catalogue, Tate Britain 2011, 240pp.
- "Something Too Academical": The Problem with Etty', in Sarah Burnage, Mark Hallett and Laura Turner (eds.), William Etty: Art & Controversy, exhibition catalogue, York Museums Trust 2011, pp. 47–59.
- 'Instituting English Folk Art', Visual Culture in Britain, vol.10, no.1, 2009, pp. 27–52.
- 'The Body of the Blasphemer', in Helen P. Bruder and Tristanne Connolly (eds.), Queer Blake, Basingstoke 2010, pp. 74–86.
- The Blake Book, London 2007, 224pp.
- William Blake: Seen in my Visions: A Descriptive Catalogue of Pictures, London 2009, 128pp.
- Gothic Nightmares: Fuseli, Blake and the Romantic Imagination, exhibition catalogue, Tate Britain, London 2006, 224pp.
- Bodybuilding: Reforming Masculinities in British Art, 1750–1810, New Haven and London 2005, 284pp.
- With Lucy Peltz (eds.), Producing the Past: Aspects of Antiquarian Culture and Practice 1700–1850, Aldershot 1999, 214pp.
