= Alfonso Múnera Cavadía =

Colombian diplomat and historian

Alfonso David Múnera Cavadía

Personal details
- Born: April 30, 1954 (age 72) Cartagena, Colombia
- Education: University of Cartagena (JD); University of Connecticut (PhD)
- Occupation: Historian, diplomat

Alfonso David Múnera Cavadía (born 1954) is a Colombian historian who served as ambassador to Jamaica (1999–2003) and Guyana (2017–) and secretary general of the Association of Caribbean States (2012–2016). He was recognized as one of 12 outstanding Afro-Colombians in 2010.

== Academic career ==
Born in Cartagena in 1954, Múnera earned a law degree from the University of Cartagena in 1981 and an MA and PhD in Latin American studies and US history from the University of Connecticut in 1995. His dissertation was entitled "Failing to Construct the Colombian Nation: Race and Class in the Andean-Caribbean Conflict, 1717–1816." In 1981, he began teaching at the University of Cartagena, where he served as vice rector of research (2007–2010) and founded the International Institute for Caribbean Studies in 2005. Múnera has been a visiting professor in Spain and the United States at institutions such as Pablo de Olavide University (1999), the University of Wisconsin (2003–2004), and the University of Seville (2006).

== Diplomatic career ==
In addition to his academic posts, Múnera served as president of the Caribbean Coast of Colombia Committee of Sciences and Technology (1996–1999). He served as Colombian ambassador to Jamaica (1999–2003) and as Special Advisor to the Caribbean (2009–2010). In February 2012, he was unanimously elected by the member states to become secretary general of the Association of Caribbean States, succeeding Luis Fernando Andrade Falla. He served from April 2012 through April 2016. In November 2017, he became Colombian ambassador to Guyana.

== Research interests ==
Múnera's research focuses on the African-descended community of Colombia and the systematic social exclusion of that community by the European criollo elite during nineteenth-century nation building. He has also examined the role of the Caribbean region in Colombia's development. His scholarship has had a significant impact on Colombian historiography and paved the way for broader academic and popular recognition of the roles that Afro-Colombians played in fighting the region's wars of independence and forging national and regional consciousnesses.
