= Christopher White (art historian) =

British art historian and curator (1930–2026)

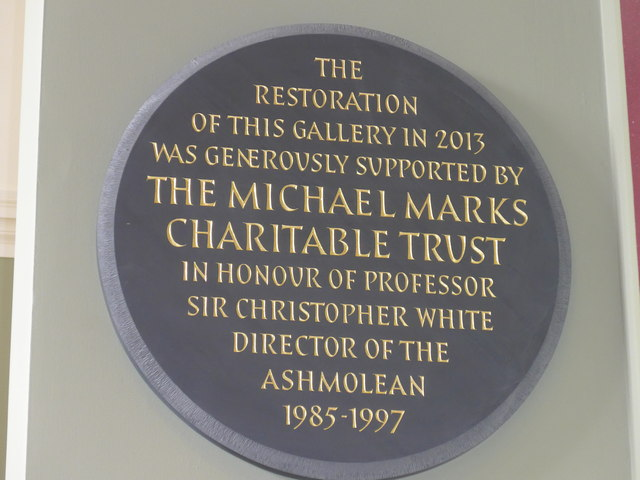
Commemorative plaque at the Ashmolean Museum in honour of Professor Sir Christopher White, installed in 2013

Sir Christopher John White CVO FBA (19 September 1930 – 8 January 2026) was a British art historian and curator. He was the son of the artist and art administrator Gabriel White. He has specialized in the study of Rembrandt and Dutch Golden Age painting and printmaking.

== Life and career ==
Educated at Downside School from 1944 to 1948, White received a BA from the University of London, followed by an MA from the University of Oxford and a PhD at the Courtauld Institute, University of London. He then joined the British Museum's Department of Prints and Drawings in 1954. From 1965 to 1971, he was director of Old Master sales at Colnaghi in London, then moving to be curator of graphic arts for the National Gallery of Art in Washington, D.C., until 1973.

From 1973, White was director of the Paul Mellon Centre for Studies in British Art, an affiliate of Yale in London, and also an associate director of the Yale Center for British Art. In 1985 he left these to become director of the Ashmolean Museum in Oxford and a fellow of Worcester College, Oxford, retiring in 1997.

In 1997, White became a trustee of the Victoria and Albert Museum. He was also vice-chairman of the British Institute of Florence and a trustee of the Mauritshuis in The Hague. He was knighted in the 2001 New Year Honours for services to art history.

White was elected a fellow of the British Academy in 1989. He was an honorary research fellow at the Courtauld Institute.

White died on 8 January 2026, at the age of 95.

== Selected works ==
His books include:

- Rembrandt as an Etcher: A Study of the Artist at Work, 1969 (ISBN 0300079532)
- The Late Etchings of Rembrandt, 1969, British Museum/Lund Humphries, London (exhibition catalogue)
- Peter Paul Rubens: Man & Artist, Yale University Press, 1987. ISBN 0-300-03778-3
- White, Christopher, Buvelot, Quentin (eds), Rembrandt by Himself, 1999, National Gallery, London/Mauritshuis, The Hague, ISBN 1857092708
- Anthony Van Dyck: Thomas Howard, Earl of Arundel (Getty Museum Studies on Art), 2006
- The Later Flemish Pictures in the Collection of Her Majesty The Queen, 2007, with Desmond Shawe-Taylor
- Dutch Pictures in the Collection of Her Majesty the Queen, 2016 (ISBN 9781905686469)
- Anthony Van Dyck and the Art of Portraiture, 2021 (ISBN 9780956800794)
- Rembrandt. World of Art series, 2022. Thames & Hudson

Cultural offices
Preceded by David Piper	Director of the Ashmolean Museum; 1985–1997	Succeeded by Roger Moorey
