= Immediations =

- Discipline: Art history
- Language: English
- Edited by: Alice Dodds and Emma Iadanza

Publication details
- History: 2004–present
- Frequency: Annually

Standard abbreviations
- ISO 4: Immediations

Indexing
- ISSN: 1742-7444
- LCCN: 901009755

Links
- Journal homepage

Immediations is an annual peer-reviewed academic journal in the history of art, published by the Courtauld Institute of Art, London. The journal was established in 2004 by Louise Sørensen, John-Paul Stonard, and Linda Goddard.

Immediations covers research on any period in the history of art by current or recent members of the postgraduate community of the Courtauld Institute of Art. Immediations also publishes interviews with art historians, no artists, conservators and curators, and transcripts of events held at The Courtauld Institute of Art Research Forum.

In 2009, Immediations initiated an occasional series of period-specific, themed volumes with Immediations Conference Papers 1: Art and Nature, Studies in Medieval Art and Architecture (ISBN 978-1907485008), edited by Laura Cleaver, Kathryn Gerry, and Jim Harris.

2014 marked the journal's tenth year, celebrated by a series of events including a Conference on 17 January 2015 at the Courtauld Institute of Art. The conference featured past contributors and editors, who discussed their current research or the ways in which the trajectory of their careers in the art world reflected their original contributions to Immediations.

The twentieth issue (2023) of Immediations was marked by the theme of 'disruption'. The following edition (2024) considered ‘Art on the Edge’.

== Editors ==
Previous editors-in-chief have been:

- 2004–2006 Louise Sørensen
- 2007 Scott Nethersole
- 2008–2009 Jim Harris
- 2010 Jocelyn Anderson, Katherine Faulkner, Jacopo Galimberti, Roo Gunzi, Jack Hartnell
- 2011–2012 Katherine Faulkner
- 2013 Marie Collier
- 2014 Harriette Peel
- 2015 Eva Bezverkhny and Maria Alessia Rossi
- 2016 Thomas Hughes and Edwin Coomasaru
- 2017 Maggie Crosland
- 2018 Teresa Lane and Talitha Schepers
- 2019 Ana-Maria Milcic and Harry Prance
- 2020 Ambra D'Antone
- 2021 Bella Radenovic
- 2022 Damiët Schneeweisz and Fred Shan
- 2023 Hattie Spires

Current editor-in-chief:

- 2024-2025: Alice Dodds and Emma Iadanza
