= Michael Kauffmann =

English art historian (1931–2023)

Claus Michael Kauffmann, FBA (5 February 1931 – 30 June 2023) was an English art historian who was Director of the Courtauld Institute, London, from 1985–95. He was succeeded by Eric Fernie. Kauffmann was a Fellow of the British Academy.

Kauffmann was born on 5 February 1931, and educated at Clitheroe Royal Grammar School and St Paul's School, London, before matriculating at Merton College, Oxford in 1950, where he read history. After graduation he took up a Junior Research Fellowship at the Warburg Institute, completing his PhD in the History of Art in 1957. He then held posts at the Warburg Institute, Manchester City Art Gallery, and the Victoria and Albert Museum. He was one of the founding trustees on the creation of National Museums Liverpool in 1986.

Michael Kauffmann was a son of Arthur Kauffmann, and married Dorothea Hill in 1954. He died on 30 June 2023, at the age of 92.

== Selected publications ==
- The Baths of Pozzuoli. A study of the medieval illuminations of Peter of Eboli's poem, Bruno Cassirer, Oxford, 1959.
- The Legend of St. Ursula. [A survey based on the painting “The Martyrdom of St. Ursula and the Eleven Thousand Virgins” in the Victoria and Albert Museum and other works. With reproductions.], Victoria & Albert Museum, London, 1964.
- The Barbizon school, Victoria & Albert Museum, London, 1965.
- Paintings at Apsley House, Victoria & Albert Museum, London, 1965.
- An altar-piece of the Apocalypse from Master Bertram's Workshop in Hamburg, Victoria & Albert Museum, London, 1968.
- Romanesque MSS 1066-1190, Harvey Miller, London, 1975.
- Paintings, water-colours and miniatures, Victoria & Albert Museum, London, 1978. ISBN 0905209109
- John Varley: 1778-1842, Batsford in association with the Victoria & Albert Museum, 1984. ISBN 0713434023
- Biblical imagery in medieval England 700-1550, Harvey Miller Publishers, London, 2002. ISBN 1872501044

Academic offices
Preceded by Peter Lasko	Director of the Courtauld Institute of Art; 1985 to 1995	Succeeded by Eric Fernie
