= Judith Colton =

American historian of art

Judith Colton is an American historian of art who is a professor emerita at Yale University. One of her best known works is The Parnasse Franc̈ois: Titon Du Tillet and the Origins of the Monument to Genius (1979), a study of Évrard Titon du Tillet.

== Background ==
Colton did her undergraduate studies at Smith College, graduating in 1963, and earned master's and doctoral degrees from the Institute of Fine Arts at New York University in 1965 and 1974 respectively. She joined the Yale faculty in 1973, and retired in 2006.

She was a long-term companion of English art historian Michael Kitson, who died in 1998.

== Works ==
In the 1970s, Colton conducted research into Queen Caroline and British aristocracy, and published papers such as "Kent's Hermitage for Queen Caroline at Richmond" in Architectura (1974), and "Merlin's Cave and Queen Caroline: Garden Art as Political Propaganda" in Eighteenth-Century Studies (1976).

One of her best known works is The Parnasse Franc̈ois: Titon Du Tillet and the Origins of the Monument to Genius (1979), a study of Évrard Titon du Tillet. In 1987 she was a contributor to the book A Taste for Angels: Neapolitan Painting in North America: 1650-1750, which included commentary on late Baroque painter and printmaker Luca Giordano.

== Selected publications ==
- "The Endymion Myth and Poussin's Detroit Painting", Journal of the Warburg and Courtauld Institutes, 30: 426–431, 1967, doi:10.2307/750763, JSTOR 750763.
- "Kent's hermitage for Queen Caroline at Richmond", Architectura, 4: 181–191, 1974
- "Merlin's Cave and Queen Caroline: Garden Art as Political Propaganda", Eighteenth-Century Studies, 10 (1): 1–20, 1976, doi:10.2307/2737814, JSTOR 2737814. Winner of the James L. Clifford Prize of the American Society for Eighteenth-Century Studies for 1977–1978.
- The Parnasse François: Titon du Tillet and the Origins of the Monument to Genius. New Haven and London: Yale University Press, 1979.
- A Taste for Angels: Neapolitan Painting in North America, 1650–1750, eds. J. Colton and G. Hersey. New Haven: Yale University Art Gallery, 1987.
