= Michael Kitson =

British art historian

- Born: Michael William Lely Kitson; 30 January 1926
- Died: 7 August 1998 (aged 72); Islington, London
- Citizenship: United Kingdom
- Occupations: Art historian, professor
- Years active: 1952-1996
- Known for: specialist on Claude Lorrain

Academic background
- Education: King's College, Cambridge

Academic work
- Era: 20th Century
- Discipline: Art history
- Sub-discipline: 17th century art
- Institutions: Courtauld Institute, London
- Main interests: 17th Century European painting

Michael William Lely Kitson (30 January 1926 – 7 August 1998) was a British art historian who became an international authority on the work of the painter Claude Lorrain.

His teaching career took in the Slade School of Fine Art and Courtauld Institute in London; he was at the latter from 1955 to 1985, ending as Professor of the History of Art from 1978 and deputy director from 1980. He then moved to be Director of Studies at the Paul Mellon Centre for Studies in British Art in London. In 1969, he organized the first major exhibition ever dedicated to Lorrain at the Laing Art Gallery in Newcastle-upon-Tyne, followed by the Hayward Gallery, London.

== Early life and education ==
Michael Kitson was born on 30 January 1926, the son of the Reverend Bernard Meredith Kitson, a Church of England clergyman, and his wife Helen May Lely. The novelist Anthony Trollope and the painter Sir Peter Lely were among his ancestors. He was educated at Gresham's School and King's College, Cambridge, where he read English (1944–45 and 1948–50), and at the Courtauld Institute of Art (1950–1952).

== Military service ==
His three years at King's College, Cambridge, were interrupted in 1945 when he was commissioned into the Royal Engineers and attached to security intelligence Middle East, based in Egypt. He left the army in 1948 and returned to Cambridge.

== Career ==
In 1952, he joined the Slade School of Fine Art at University College London, as an assistant lecturer in the history of art. He moved on to the Courtauld Institute, London, as a lecturer from 1955 to 1967 and as a reader from 1967 to 1978. He became Professor of the history of art there in 1978 and was deputy director of the institute from 1980 to 1985.

In 1985, Kitson became Director of Studies at the Paul Mellon Centre for Studies in British Art, London, a British educational charity with close links to Yale University.

Kitson became an international authority on Claude Lorrain and organized the first Lorrain exhibition at the Hayward Gallery, London, in 1969. In 1978 he catalogued the Liber Veritatis, Lorrain's own drawings of his paintings, for the British Museum and later wrote the article on Lorrain for the Macmillan Dictionary of Art (1996).

He shared an interest in 17th-century French painting with Anthony Blunt and later wrote the article on Blunt for the Oxford Dictionary of National Biography.

== Family ==
On 8 July 1950, Kitson married Annabella, the daughter of John Leslie Cloudsley. They had two sons. In the 1980s Kitson became the partner of Judith Colton, an American art scholar.

== Death ==
After his death in Islington, London, on 7 August 1998, a memorial service was held at St Clement Danes on 23 October 1998, with an address by Neil MacGregor, Director of the National Gallery.

== Publications ==
- J. M. W. Turner (Barnes & Noble, 1963)
- English painting (Art of the Western World), with Alexandra Wedgwood (Paul Hamlyn London, and Golden Press, New York 1964)
- Frans Hals (1965)
- The Age of Baroque: Landmarks of the World's Art, Architecture, Sculpture, Portraits, Landscapes, Interior Decoration (Paul Hamlyn, London, 1966)
- The Complete Paintings of Caravaggio (London, Abrams, 1967; new edition Weidenfeld & Nicolson, 1969 and 1986, ISBN 978-0-297-76108-2)
- The Art of Claude Lorrain (Arts Council, London, 1969)
- Rembrandt (Phaidon Press, editions in 1969, 1971, 1978 and 1994)
- Claude Lorrain, Liber veritatis (British Museum Publications, London, 1978) ISBN 0-7141-0748-4
- Discovering the Italian Baroque by Gabriele Finaldi and Michael Kitson (catalogue of Sir Denis Mahon's collection) (National Gallery, 1997) ISBN 1-85709-177-9
- The Seeing Eye: Critical Writings on Art (a collection of essays) (Mnemosyne Press, 2008) ISBN 978-0-9525970-1-8
- Complete Bibliography
