= Paul Mellon Centre for Studies in British Art =

Centre for research into the history of British Art

Coordinates: 51°31′08.08″N 00°07′48.39″W

- Type: Private
- Established: 1970
- Parent institution: Yale University
- Affiliations: Yale Center for British Art
- Director: Sarah Victoria Turner
- Campus: Urban
- Website: www.paul-mellon-centre.ac.uk

The Paul Mellon Centre for Studies in British Art is a scholarly centre in London devoted to supporting original research into the history of British Art. It was founded in 1970 and endowed by a gift from Paul Mellon. Since 1996, it has been situated at 16 Bedford Square in a Grade I listed building. This building houses an outstanding library of 26,000 publications focused on British art and architecture, and over 25 collected archives which include papers of eminent art historians such as Ellis K. Waterhouse, Oliver Millar, Brian Sewell, Brinsley Ford and Roy Strong. It also holds the records of its own institutional archives, including a growing oral history collection. The centre compiled its own photographic archive from 1970 to 1996 and now also holds the Tate photographic archive. All of these research collections are available to consult in the centre's Public Study Room.

As well as being incorporated as a British educational charity, the centre is part of Yale University and provides teaching in London for Yale students, through the successful Yale-in-London scheme. The centre supports a publication programme through Yale University Press and co-ordinates its activities with the sister institution, the Yale Center for British Art in New Haven.

The centre administers a comprehensive programme of grants and fellowships designed to support research into the history of British art, and hosts workshops, symposia, conferences and regular series of seminars.

The centre is a registered charity under English law and is a member of the Association of Research Institutes in Art History.

== Publications ==
The Paul Mellon Centre underwrites the production costs of publications concerned with the study of British art and architecture. The current Head of Research Resources and Publications is Kate Retford. The books are distributed by Yale University Press. In 2015 the centre launched an online and open access journal, British Art Studies, that is copublished with the Yale Center for British Art.

The centre published an online catalogue raisonné of the artist Richard Wilson to coincide with the tercentenary of the artist's birth. In 2016, the centre published another catalogue raisonné of the artist Francis Towne.

In March 2019, the Paul Mellon Centre's open access, peer-reviewed digital publication The Royal Academy Summer Exhibition: A Chronicle, 1769-2018 was nominated for a Webby Award and won the People's Vote award in the art website category.

== Directors ==
Academic offices
Preceded by Mark Hallett 2013–2023, Brian Allen 1993–2012, Michael Kitson 1985–1995, Christopher White 1973–1985, Ellis K. Waterhouse 1970–1973	Sarah Victoria Turner, Director, Paul Mellon Centre for Studies in British Art; 2023 to present

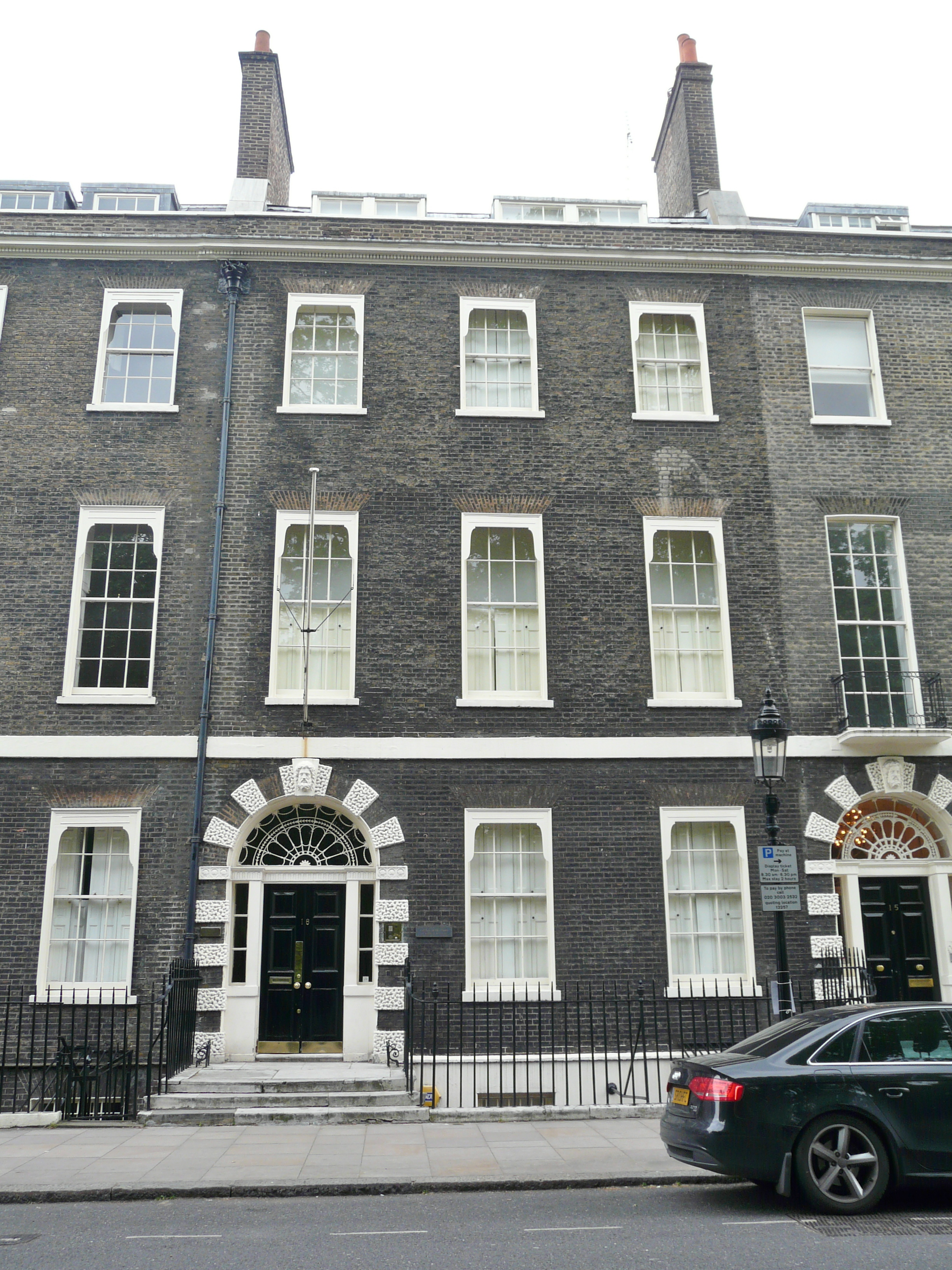
Paul Mellon Centre for Studies in British Art

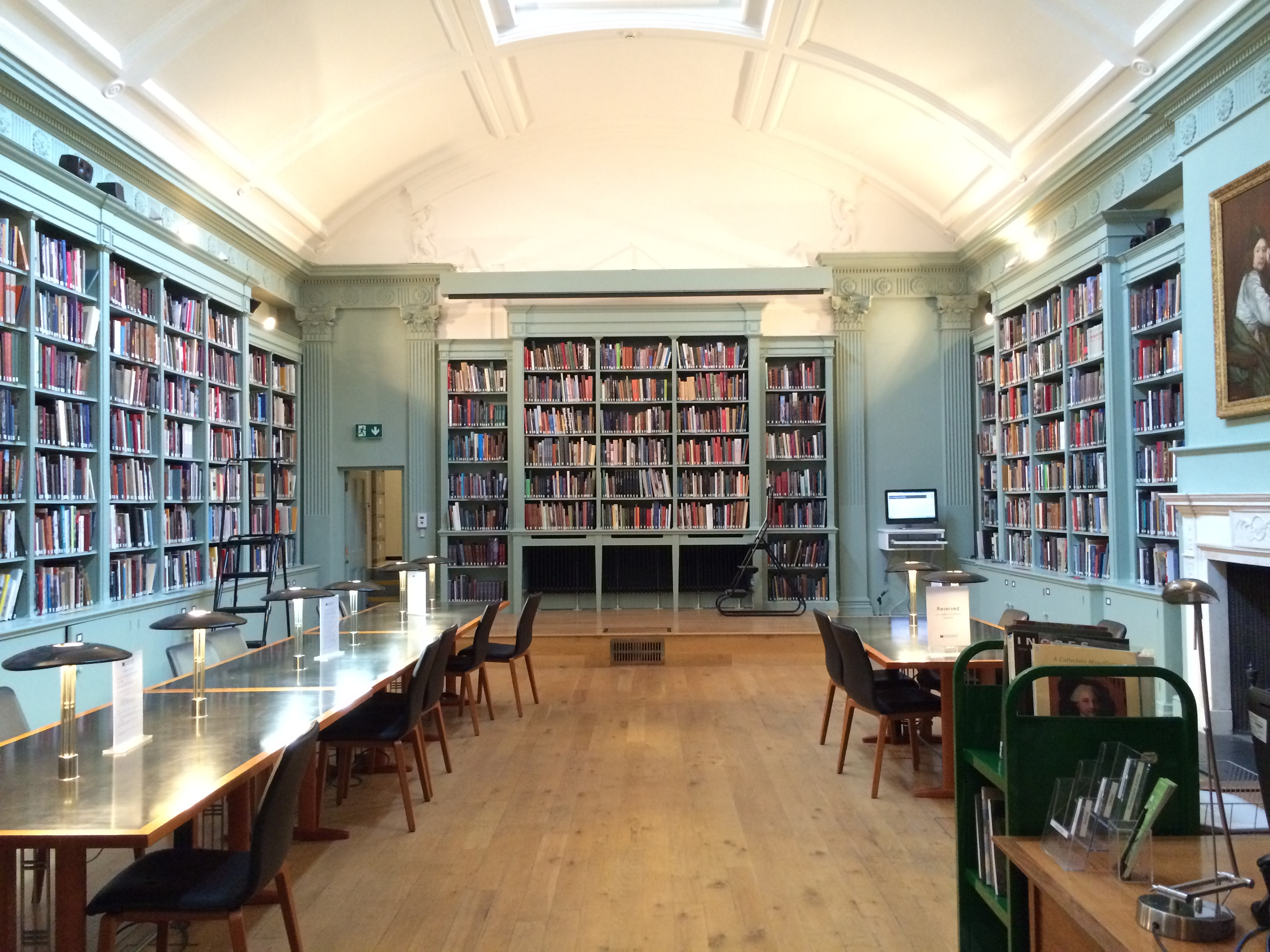
The Public Study Room at The Paul Mellon Centre, 16 Bedford Square, London, 2015.

== News articles ==
- New York Times Article An Anglophilic Yankee Aristocrat and His Finds Across the Pond
- New York Times Article Voracious Anglophile

== See also ==
- British Art Network
