= British Art Network =

Curatorial research network for British art

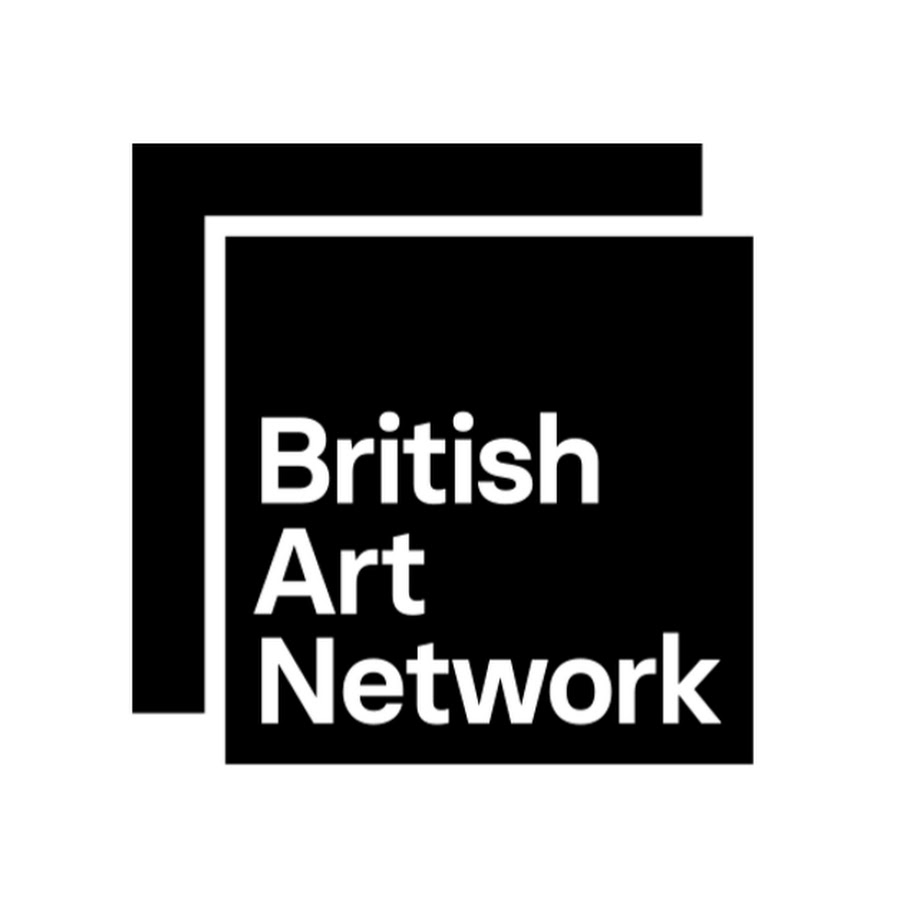
- British Art Network Logo
- Abbreviation: BAN
- Formation: 2012
- Founder: Tate
- Type: Subject Specialist Network
- Purpose: Curatorial research, practice and theory in British art
- Region served: International
- Members: >1,000 (2021)
- Main organ: Steering Group
- Affiliations: Paul Mellon Centre for Studies in British Art; Tate
- Website: britishartnetwork.org.uk

British Art Network (BAN) is a Subject Specialist Network supported by the Paul Mellon Centre for Studies in British Art and Tate. It promotes curatorial research, practice, and theory within the field of British art. The network facilitates the sharing of expertise and critical debate among curators, academics, artist-researchers, conservators, and producers.

The network focuses on expanding definitions of British art, addressing complex historical truths, and communicating the public value of British art collections. Its activities aim to forge connections and provide space for critical exchange. BAN supports members working in museums, galleries, heritage settings, and educational institutions across the United Kingdom and internationally.

== History and governance ==
The network was established in 2012 by Tate to build scholarly capacity in the UK museum sector. In 2018, the Paul Mellon Centre for Studies in British Art became a partner host, leading to an expansion of activity.

The programme is overseen by a team based at Tate and the Paul Mellon Centre. It is guided by a Steering Group comprising members with diverse professional backgrounds in the field. By June 2021, the membership exceeded 1,000 individuals, including international members from the United States, Europe, India, and Australia.

== Programmes and research ==
The network organises training, workshops, and conferences, comprising two developmental streams: the Emerging Curators Group (ECG), which involves curators, freelance researchers, writers, and artists, and the Curatorial Forum. Specific themes are explored through Research Groups. The 2020–21 schedule covered Working Class British Art, British South-Asian Visual Art Post-Cool Britannia, Race, Empire and the Pre-Raphaelites, Queer British Art, Black British Art, and British Landscapes.

Recent seminar series include Itinerant Imaginaries and Irish Modernisms. Additionally, the network partnered with the Understanding British Portraits and European Paintings Pre-1900 networks for the Museum Collections on Prescription: Health, Wellbeing and Inclusivity conference, and collaborated with the UAL Decolonising Arts Institute on the Curating Nation series.

== Membership and bursaries ==
Membership is free and open to individuals actively engaged in curating, researching, or interpreting British art. Members receive newsletters featuring critical essays and interviews, as well as priority access to the annual conference.

BAN provides bursaries to support research into curatorial issues. Funding covers travel, research time, seminars, workshops, and publications.
