= Architectura =

Academic journal

Architectura: Zeitschrift für Geschichte der Baukunst is a biannual peer-reviewed academic journal of the history of architecture published by Deutscher Kunstverlag. The journal was established in 1971 and is abstracted and indexed in the Arts and Humanities Citation Index, Art Abstracts, Art Index, and Current Contents/Arts & Humanities. Articles are in German or English. The editors-in-chief are Barry Bergdoll, Andreas Schwarting and Klaus Tragbar.
