= Courtauld Institute of Art =

University in London

The Courtauld Institute of Art
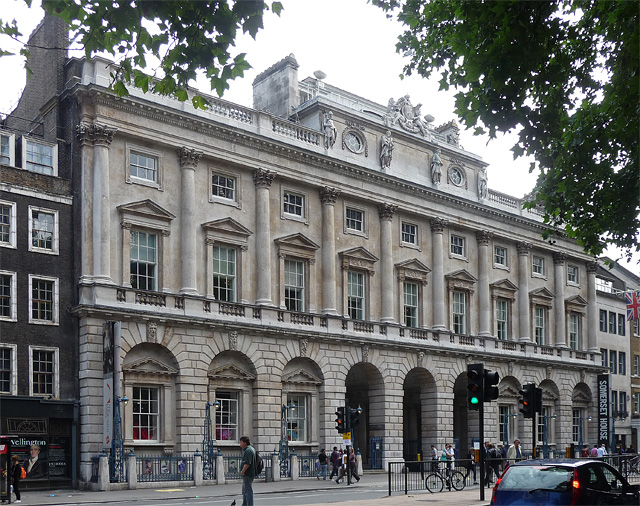
- Somerset House, home of the Courtauld
- Type: Public
- Established: 1932
- Parent institution: University of London
- Endowment: £47.8 million (2025)
- Budget: £44.0 million (2024/25)
- Chancellor: The Princess Royal (as Chancellor of the University of London)
- Director: Mark Hallett
- Students: 630 (2024/25)
- Undergraduates: 270 (2024/25)
- Postgraduates: 360 (2024/25)
- Location: London, United Kingdom; 51°30′39″N 0°07′02″W
- Campus: Urban
- Website: courtauld.ac.uk

The Courtauld Institute of Art (/ˈkɔːrtoʊld/) is a self-governing college of the University of London specialising in the study of the history of art and conservation.

The art collection is known particularly for its French Impressionist and Post-Impressionist paintings, and is housed in the Courtauld Gallery. The Courtauld is based in Somerset House, in the Strand in London. In 2019, the Courtauld's teaching and research activities temporarily relocated to Vernon Square, London, while its Somerset House site underwent a major regeneration project.

== History ==
The Courtauld was founded in 1932 through the philanthropic efforts of the industrialist and art collector Samuel Courtauld, the diplomat and collector Lord Lee of Fareham, and the art historian Sir Robert Witt.

Originally the Courtauld was based in Home House, a townhouse designed by Robert Adam in Portman Square, Marylebone. The Strand block of Somerset House, designed by William Chambers from 1775 to 1780, has housed the Courtauld since 1989.

The Courtauld has been an independent college of the University of London since 2002.

The Courtauld has featured several times on the BBC's arts programme Fake or Fortune. In April 2020, during the COVID-19 pandemic, the Institute offered digital "mini festivals" called "Open Courtauld Hour".

Between 2018 and 2021 the Courtauld undertook a major redevelopment of its Somerset House premises as part of the project Courtauld Connects. The Courtauld Gallery, closed since 2018 for renovation, reopened on 19 November 2021 following a three-year transformation that introduced improved accessibility, refurbished historic interiors and enhanced display and visitor facilities.

In November 2025 the Institute announced a further £82 million redevelopment of its Grade I-listed Somerset House campus, intended to consolidate teaching, research and gallery functions within a unified site by connecting neighbouring Strand buildings and providing new teaching spaces, a lecture theatre and an expanded library. Work is expected to continue into the late 2020s, with completion projected for 2029.

== Academic profile ==
Since 2019, teaching has largely taken place at the Vernon Square campus

The Courtauld Institute of Art is the major centre for the study of the history and conservation of art and architecture in the United Kingdom. It offers undergraduate and postgraduate teaching to around 400 students each year. Degrees are awarded by the University of London. In 2026, the Courtauld Institute was ranked the world's top institution for the study of History of Art, according to the QS World University Rankings.

The Courtauld was ranked first in the United Kingdom for History and History of Art in The Guardian's 2011 University Guide. In the 2014 Research Excellence Framework, it was confirmed in this rank for research quality. The Independent has called it "probably the most prestigious specialist college for the study of the history of art in the world".

The Courtauld was ranked, again, first in the United Kingdom for History and History of Art in The Guardian's 2017 University Guide. More recently, in The Guardian's 2024 league table for History of Art the Institute was ranked eighth, while the Complete University Guide 2025 subject table placed it 11th for History of Art, Architecture and Design. Internationally, the Institute has continued to appear in global subject rankings, including a top-five placement worldwide for art and design in the QS World University Rankings by Subject 2025.

=== Research ===
According to the 2014 Research Excellence Framework, the Courtauld hosts the highest proportion of the UK's world-leading and internationally excellent research among all higher education institutions with 95% of research rated in the top two categories (4*/3*), 56% of which was rated in the 4* category, tied for highest in the UK with London Business School.

=== Admissions ===
UCAS Admission Statistics
	2025	2024	2023	2022	2021
Applications (Note: Main scheme applications, International and UK)	275	325	310	320	310
Accepted	100	95	95	105	100
Applications/Accepted Ratio	2.8	3.4	3.3	3.0	3.1
Overall Offer Rate (%)	87.2	71.2	72.6	75.9	79.5
↳ UK only (%) (Note: UK domiciled applicants)	91.2	81.6	81.5	86.4	85.4
Average Entry Tariff	—N/a	—N/a	—N/a	156	X
↳ Top three exams (Note: The maximum tariff score for three exams is 168: the equivalent of A*A*A* at A-Level, 777 at HL for the IB Diploma Programme, or AAA at Advanced Higher)	—N/a	—N/a	141.8	143.8	139.8

HESA Student Body Composition (2024/25)
Domicile and Ethnicity	Total
British White (Note: Not be confused solely with White British)	55%
British Ethnic Minorities (Note: Includes those who identify as Asian, Black, Mixed Heritage, Arab or any other ethnicity except White.)	14%
International EU	7%
International Non-EU	24%

In the 2024/25 academic year, the student body consisted of 630 students, composed of 270 undergraduates and 360 postgraduate students. The only undergraduate course offered by the Courtauld is a BA in the History of Art and applications are made through UCAS. This is a full-time course designed to introduce students to all aspects of the study of art history. The university is generally designated as a 'high-tariff' institution by the Department for Education, with the average undergraduate entrant to the university in recent years amassing between 139–144 UCAS Tariff points in their top three pre-university qualifications – the equivalent of AAB to AAA at A-Level. Based on 2022/23 HESA entry standards data published in domestic league tables, which include a broad range of qualifications beyond the top three exam grades, the average student at the Courtauld achieved 156 points.

=== Postgraduate study ===
Seven courses are offered at postgraduate level: full‑time Graduate Diploma (9 months), MA History of Art (9 months), MA Curating (12 months) and Conservation of Buddhist Heritage (12 months), Conservation of Easel Paintings (3 years), and Conservation of Wall Paintings (3 years).

Beginning in September 2025, a new one-year MA Art and Business, taught in collaboration with King's Business School, will combine the study of visual culture with practical training in gallery and consultancy management. The one-year MA Contemporary Art and the Moving Image (CAMI) is taught in collaboration with the King's College film Studies department and focuses on the intersection of contemporary art and moving image practice.

Students on the History of Art MA choose a specialisation – ranging from antiquity and early modern to global contemporary – and engage in "Special Options" seminars, taught in intimate groups of 8–10 on topics spanning Byzantium, Black British art, early modern China. The Courtauld's PhD programme is three-years full-time, or can be taken over six-years part-time.

=== Study resources ===
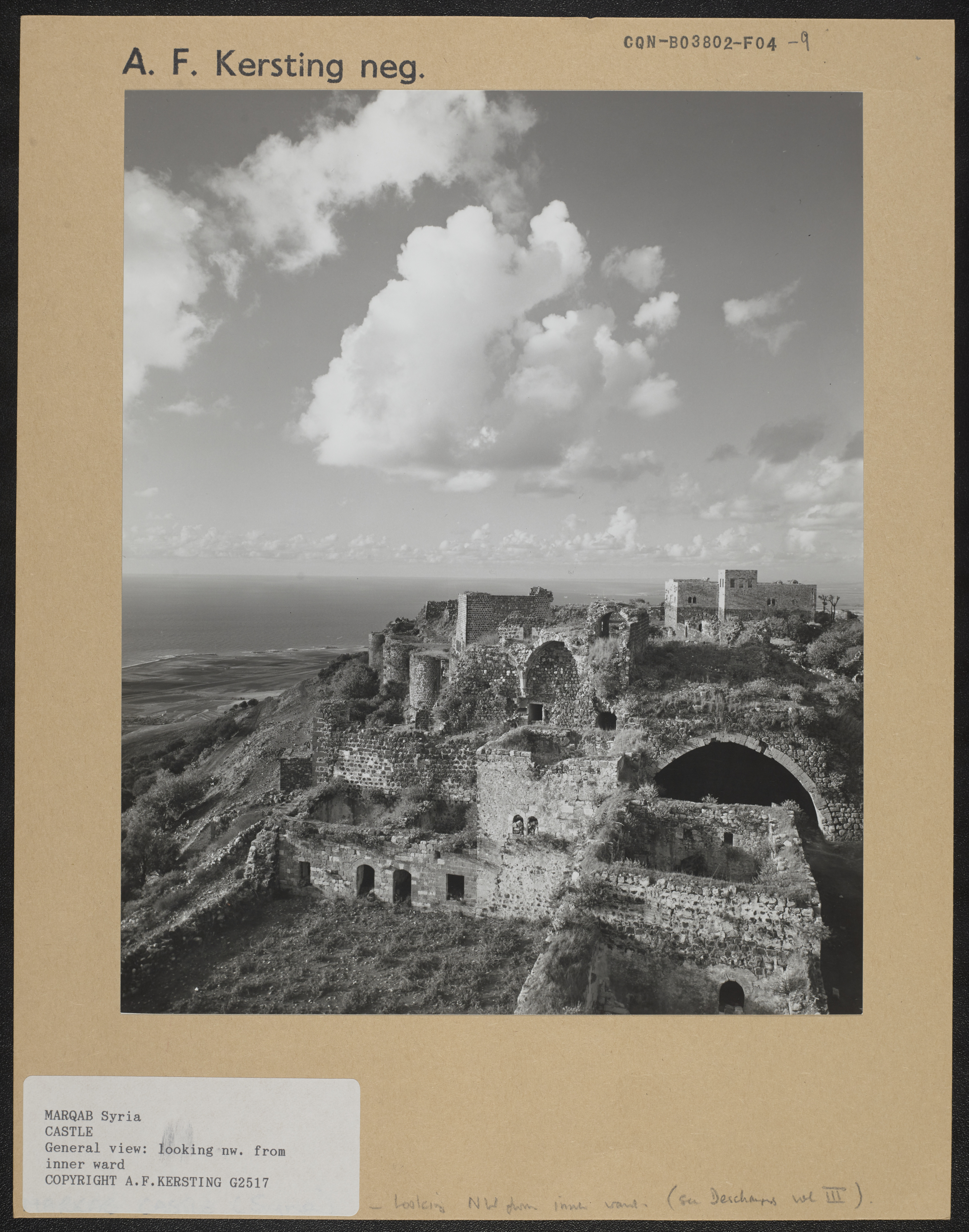
Qalaat al-Marqab (Margat Castle), Syria, photographed by Anthony F. Kersting. Photograph held at the Conway Library.

The Courtauld has two photographic libraries which originated as the private collections of two benefactors: the Conway Library, covering architecture, architectural drawings, sculpture and illuminated manuscripts, named after Lord Conway of Allington, and the Witt Library, after Sir Robert Witt, covering paintings, drawings and engravings, and containing over two million reproductions of works by over 70,000 artists. In 2009, it was decided that the Witt Library would not continue to add new material to the collection, and in 2017 a mass digitisation project to make both Witt and Conway items available online commenced as part of Courtauld Connects. The Photographic Collections website featuring the fully digitised Conway Library launched in 2023 and The Witt Library launched in 2025. Images are viewable and downloadable in high-resolution, allowing users unprecedented access to nearly 3 million items that were previously not catalogued and only accessible in person.

The book library is one of the UK's largest holdings of art history books, periodicals and exhibition catalogues. There is a slide library which also covers films, and an IT suite.

An online image collection provides access to more than 40,000 images, including paintings and drawings from the Courtauld Gallery, and over 35,000 photographs of architecture and sculpture from the Conway Library. Two other websites sell high-resolution digital files to scholars, publishers and broadcasters, and photographic prints to a wide public audience.

The Courtauld uses a virtual learning environment to deliver course material to its students. Since 2004, the Courtauld has published an annual research journal, Immediations, edited by current members of the research student body. Each cover of the journal has been commissioned by a leading contemporary artist. Additionally, together with the Warburg Institute, the institute publishes The Journal of the Warburg and Courtauld Institutes, an annual publication of about 300 pages (ISSN 0075-4390).

== The Courtauld Gallery ==
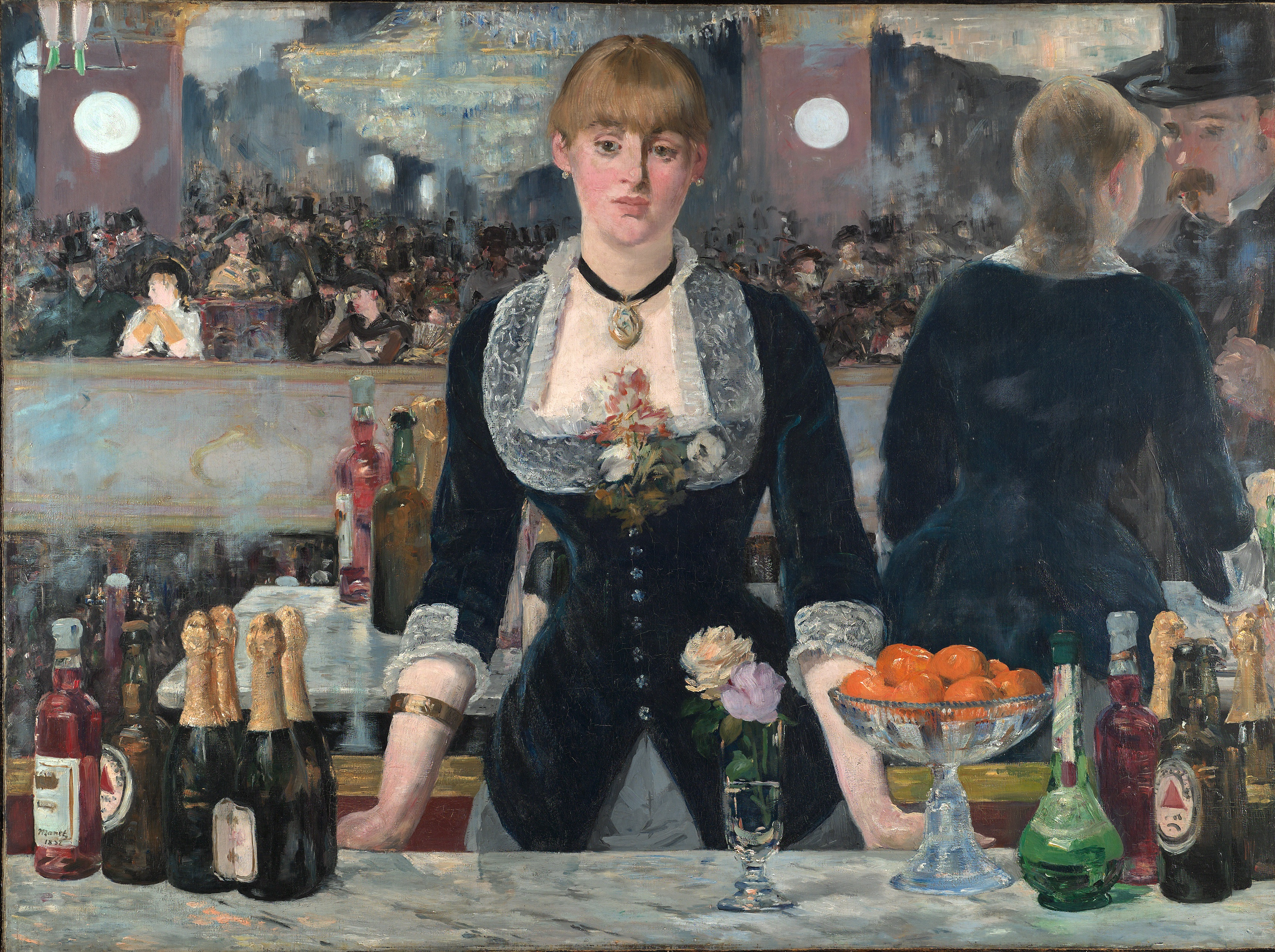
A Bar at the Folies-Bergère (1882) by Édouard Manet, in the Courtauld Gallery's collection since 1934

The Courtauld's art collection is housed in the Courtauld Gallery. The collection was begun by the institute's founder, Samuel Courtauld, who presented an extensive collection of mainly Impressionist and Post-Impressionist paintings in 1932. It was enhanced by further gifts in the 1930s and a bequest in 1948, and has since received many significant donations and bequests. The gallery contains some 530 paintings and over 26,000 drawings and prints. Since 1989, the gallery been housed in the Strand block of Somerset House, which was the first home of the Royal Academy, founded in 1768. In April 2013, the Head of the Courtauld Gallery was Ernst Vegelin.

== Notable people associated with the Courtauld ==
The Courtauld is well known for its many graduates who have become directors of art museums around the world. These include the Metropolitan Museum of Art, New York; the Museum of Modern Art, New York; the National Gallery, London; the National Portrait Gallery, London; the British Museum, London; the Tate, London; the Fine Arts Museums of San Francisco, San Francisco; the National Gallery of Art, Washington; and the Museo del Prado, Madrid. The number of notable alumni in the fine arts has earned graduates the "Courtauld Mafia" nickname.

=== Directors ===
- William George Constable – 1932–1936
- T. S. R. Boase – 1936–1947
- Anthony Blunt – 1947–1974
- Peter Lasko – 1974–1985
- Michael Kauffmann – 1985–1995
- Eric Fernie – 1995–2003
- James Cuno – 2003–2004
- Deborah Swallow – 2004–2023
- Mark Hallett – 2023–present
