= Frey Ramos =

Colombian footballer (born 1989)

Personal information
- Full name: Frey David Ramos Marrugo
- Date of birth: April 25, 1989 (age 37)
- Place of birth: Cartagena, Bolívar, Colombia
- Height: 1.79 m (5 ft 10 in)
- Position: Midfielder

Team information
- Current team: Millonarios

Youth career
- 2007–2008: Millonarios

Senior career*
Years	Team	Apps	(Gls)
2008–present	Millonarios	5	(0)
- * Club domestic league appearances and goals as of November 14, 2010

Frey David Ramos Marrugo (Note: In this Spanish name, the first or paternal surname is Ramos and the second or maternal family name is Marrugo.) (born April 25, 1989), known as Frey Ramos, is a Colombian football midfield, who currently plays for Millonarios in the Categoría Primera A. Ramos is a product of the Millonarios youth system and played with the Millonarios first team since August 2008.

== Statistics (Official games/Colombian Ligue and Colombian Cup) ==
(As of November 14, 2010)

Year	Team	Colombian Ligue Matches	Goals	Colombian Cup Matches	Goals	Total Matches	Total Goals
2008	Millonarios	0	0	2	0	2	0
2009	Millonarios	1	0	0	0	1	0
2010	Millonarios	4	0	6	0	10	0
Total	Millonarios	5	0	8	0	13	0
