= Miss International Germany =

National beauty pageant

Miss International Germany Miss Deutschland
- Formation: 1991
- Type: Beauty pageant
- Headquarters: Berlin
- Location: Germany
- Members: Miss International
- Official language: German
- Key people: Miss Germany
- Website: missdeutschland.tv

Miss International Germany (Miss Deutschland-International) is a national beauty pageant in under MGO (Komitee Miss Deutschland) in Germany to select an official candidate for the Miss International pageant.

== History ==
Between 1960 and 1990 the Miss Germany runner-up or winner went to Miss International. In 1991, the MGA (Miss Germany Association, Bergheim near Cologne) of Detlef Tursies run a Miss Germany pageant for the first time. The winners participate in Miss Universe, Miss International, Miss Europe, and Miss Intercontinental pageant. In 1999, MGA transforms into MGO (Miss Germany Organisation). From 2000, they award the title Miss Deutschland, and change their name again: MGO - Komitee Miss Deutschland. Traditionally, the official winner will be competing at the Miss Universe pageant. In 2009, MGO lost the franchise of Miss Universe.

== Titleholders ==
=== 1960–1990 ===
Year	Miss International Germany	Represented	Competition performance		Ref.
Year	Miss International Germany	Represented	Placement	Special awards	Ref.
1960	Helga Marianne Kirsch	—	Top 15		
1961	Renate Moller	—	Top 15		
1962	Erni Jung	—	Top 15		
1963	Marion Sibylle Zota	—	Top 15		
1964	Monika Brugger	—	Top 15		
1965	Ingrid Finger	—	Miss International 1965		
1967	Renate Schmale	—	Unplaced		
1968	Margot Schmalzriedt	—	Unplaced		
1969	Brigitta Komorowski	—	Unplaced		
1970	Silke Maria Kahl	—	Top 15		
1971	Christa Saul	—	Unplaced		
1972	Brigitte Burfino	—	Top 15		
1973	Ingeborg Braun	—	Top 15	Miss Friendship	
1974	Martina Maria Zanft	—	Top 15		
1975	Sigrid Silke Klose	—	Unplaced		
1976	Paula Bergner	—	Unplaced		
1977	Dagmar Winkler	—	1st Runner-up		
1978	Petra Brinkmann	—	3rd Runner-up		
1979	Claudia Katharina Herzog	—	Unplaced	Miss Photogenic	
1980	Petra Machalinski	—	Unplaced		
1981	Barbara Reimund	—	Top 15	Miss Photogenic	
1982	Jutta Beck	—	Unplaced		
1983	Loana Katharina Radecki	—	Unplaced		
1984	Petra Geisler	—	Top 15		
1985	Stefanie Angelika Roth	—	Unplaced		
1986	Birgit Jahn	—	Unplaced		
1987	Dagmar Schulz	—	Top 15		
1988	Christiane Kopp	—	Unplaced		
1989	Iris Klein	—	Miss International 1989		
1990	Ilka Endres	—	Unplaced		

=== 1991–1999: Miss Germany Association GmbH (Bergheim near Cologne) ===
In 1999, Miss MGA replaced as MGO which held the official Miss Germany to Miss Universe, Miss International and Miss Europe.

Year	Miss International Germany	Represented	Site of election	Competition performance		Ref.
Year	Miss International Germany	Represented	Site of election	Placement	Special awards	Ref.
1991	Katrin Richter	—	Bielefeld	Unplaced		
1992	Meike Schwarz	Saarland	Dresden	Top 10		
1993	Katja Mordarski	—	Bremen	Unplaced		
1994	Viola Tuschardt	—	Chemnitz	Unplaced		
1995	Katja Honak	—	Trier	Unplaced		
1996	Andrea Walaschewski	—	Trier	Unplaced		
1997	Manuela Breer	—	Trier	Unplaced		
1998	Fiona Ammann	—	Trier	Unplaced		
1999	Tania Freuderberg	—	Trier	Unplaced		

=== 2000–present ===
Before 2009 the runners-up of Miss Deutschland went to Miss International, in addition the winner sometimes competed at the pageant.

Year	Miss International Germany	Represented	Site of election	Competition performance		Ref.
Year	Miss International Germany	Represented	Site of election	Placement	Special Awards	Ref.
2000	Doreen Adler	Berlin	Kaiserslautern	Unplaced	Miss Friendship	
2001	Anna Ziemski	Berlin	Kaiserslautern	Unplaced		
2002	Eva Dedecke	Berlin	Kaiserslautern	Unplaced		
2003	Alexandra Vodjanikova	North Rhine-Westphalia	Bielefeld	Unplaced		
2004	Natascha Börger	Hamburg	Duisburg	Top 15		
2005	Annika Pinter	Berlin	Aachen	Unplaced		
2006	Hiltja Müller	Berlin	Berlin	Unplaced		
2007	Svetlana Tsys	Saxony	Berlin	Unplaced		
2008	Katharina Bondarenko	Lower Saxony	Niedersachsen	Unplaced		
2009	Valora Roucek	North Rhine-Westphalia	Cologne	Unplaced		
2010	Johanna Acs	North Rhine-Westphalia	Eschweiler	Top 15		
2011	Sandra Barbara Kaczmarczyk	Berlin	Berlin	Unplaced		
2012	Aline Marie Massel	Hamburg	Munich	Unplaced		
2013	Oksana Koroleva	Berlin	Berlin	Unplaced		
2014	Katharina Rodin	Hesse	Frankfurt	Unplaced		
2017	Victoria Selivanov	Thuringia	Erfurt	Did Not Compete		
2018	Franciska Acs	North Rhine-Westphalia	Düsseldorf	Unplaced		
2019	Annabella Fleck	Munich	Düsseldorf	Unplaced		
2022	Jasmin Selberg	Dortmund	Düsseldorf	Miss International 2022		
2023	Did Not Compete					
2024	Silvia Dörre Sanchez	Leipzig	Berlin	Did Not Compete		
2025	Lara Doval	Berlin	Berlin	Did Not Compete		
2026	Marlene Jose	Bavaria	Neu-Ulm	TBA		

== See also ==
- Miss Germany
- Miss Universe Germany
- Miss World Germany
- Miss Earth Germany

== Official website ==
- Miss Deutschland
