= Jasmin Selberg =

German beauty pageant titleholder

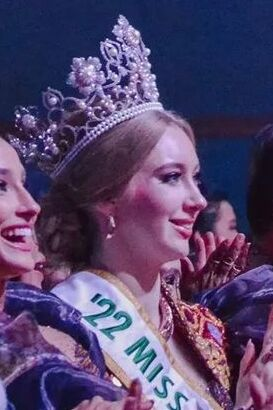
- Selberg in 2023
- Born: 11 August 1999 (age 27); Tallinn, Estonia
- Height: 175
- Beauty pageant titleholder
- Title: The Miss Globe Germany 2021; Miss Supranational Germany 2022; Miss International Germany 2022; Miss International 2022
- Hair color: blonde
- Major competitions: The Miss Globe 2021; (Top 15); (Miss Social Media); Miss Universe Germany 2022; (Top 16); Miss Supranational 2022; (Unplaced); Miss International Germany 2022; (Winner); Miss International 2022; (Winner)

Jasmin Selberg (born 11 August 1999) is a German model and beauty queen who was crowned Miss International 2022.

== Early life and education ==
Jasmin Selberg was born 11 August 1999 in Tallinn, Estonia. Her family moved from Estonia to Germany when she was one year old.

== Pageantry ==
=== The Miss Globe 2021 ===
Selberg represented Germany at Miss Globe International 2021, and finished in the top 15. She also won the Miss Social Media award.

=== Miss Universe Germany 2022 ===
Selberg entered the Miss Universe Germany 2022 and finished in the top 16.

=== Miss Supranational 2022 ===
Selberg represented Germany at the Miss Supranational 2022 pageant, where she finished in 27th place.

=== Miss International Germany 2022 ===
Selberg won the Miss International Germany 2022 pageant.

=== Miss International 2022 ===
After winning the national pageant, Selberg represented Germany at Miss International 2022, held at Tokyo Dome City Hall, Tokyo, Japan on December 13, 2022.

At the end of the event, Selberg was crowned as Miss International 2022, succeeding Miss International 2019 Sireethorn Leearamwat of Thailand. She became the third German winner following Ingrid Finger at Miss International 1965 and Iris Klein at Miss International 1989. Selberg was also the first European winner since Alejandra Andreu of Spain, who won Miss International 2008.

Awards and achievements
Preceded by (Thailand) Sireethorn Leearamwat	Miss International; 2022	Succeeded by (Venezuela) Andrea Rubio
Preceded by Annabella Fleck	Miss International Germany; 2022	Succeeded by Silvia Dörre Sanchez
Preceded by Denisse Ligpitan	Miss Supranational Germany; 2022	Succeeded by Maria Ignat
Preceded by Franziska Holzer	The Miss Globe Germany; 2021	Succeeded by Sama Parajuli
