= Universidad Autónoma de Occidente =

Private university in Cali, Colombia

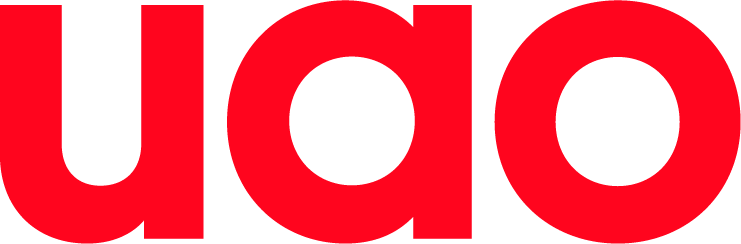
- Type: Private
- Established: February 20, 1970
- Affiliations: CIDESCO, AFACOM, Universia, FELAFACS, RUAV, RENATA, ANEIAP
- Chancellor: Diego Hernández Losada
- Academic staff: 780
- Students: 8,000
- Undergraduates: 6172
- Postgraduates: 1262
- Location: Cali, Valle del Cauca, Colombia; 3°21′14″N 76°31′22″W
- Campus: Urban
- Colors: Red and Black
- Website: https://uao.edu.co

The Universidad Autónoma de Occidente (UAO) is a private university in Cali, Colombia.

== History ==
Established in 1970, the university's first seat was in Champagnat neighborhood, in Cali.

In 1999, construction of its new campus was completed, located in the south of the city, in an area called Valle del Lilí.

== Academics ==
UAO has four faculties with 28 undergraduate programs (two of them by dual education system), as well as 41 postgraduate and 8 master's degrees.

The university's highlights in the region are the high investment in technology and investigation, reflected by its 64 laboratories, faculty staff with doctorate and master's degrees, and 29 research groups, 26 of which are accepted by Colciencias.

== Notable alumni ==
- Lucia Aldana, Miss Colombia 2012
