= Gudzowaty =

Gudzowaty is a Polish language surname. It may refer to:

- Aleksander Gudzowaty (1938–2013), Polish businessman
- Melody Gudzowaty (born 1989), Dominican-Spanish model
- Tomasz Gudzowaty (born 1971), Polish documentary, portrait and art photographer
