= Miss International 2022 =

60th Miss International competition, beauty pageant edition

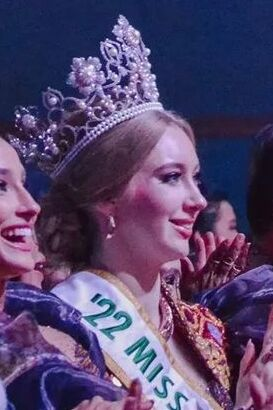
- Jasmin Selberg
- Date: 13 December 2022
- Presenters: Tetsuya Bessho; Rachel Chan
- Entertainment: Miyavi; Kodō
- Theme: Beauties For SDGs
- Venue: Tokyo Dome City Hall, Tokyo, Japan
- Entrants: 66
- Placements: 15
- Debuts: Cape Verde; Uzbekistan
- Withdrawals: Argentina; Armenia; Aruba; Belize; Burkina Faso; Cameroon; China; Côte d'Ivoire; Equatorial Guinea; Ghana; Guadeloupe; Guam; Liberia; Morocco; Myanmar; Netherlands; Russia; South Sudan; Sri Lanka; Sweden; Tahiti; Tunisia; Uganda; Ukraine; Zambia; Zimbabwe
- Returns: Cuba; Germany; Greece; Jamaica; Kenya; Namibia; South Korea; Togo
- Winner: Jasmin Selberg; Germany
- Best National Costume: Nigina Fakhriddinova, Uzbekistan
- Photogenic: Valeria Gutiérrez, Ecuador

External videos
- The 60th Miss International Beauty Pageant 2022

Miss International 2022 was the 60th edition of the Miss International pageant, held at the Tokyo Dome City Hall in Tokyo, Japan, on 13 December 2022.

Sireethorn Leearamwat of Thailand crowned Jasmin Selberg of Germany as her successor at the end of the event.

The coronation was initially scheduled in 2020. However, due to the COVID-19 pandemic, it moved at least twice; first in 2021, and later to 13 December 2022. The cancellations of 2020–21 marked the second time Miss International pageant has been cancelled since 1966, because of the COVID-19 pandemic.

== Background ==
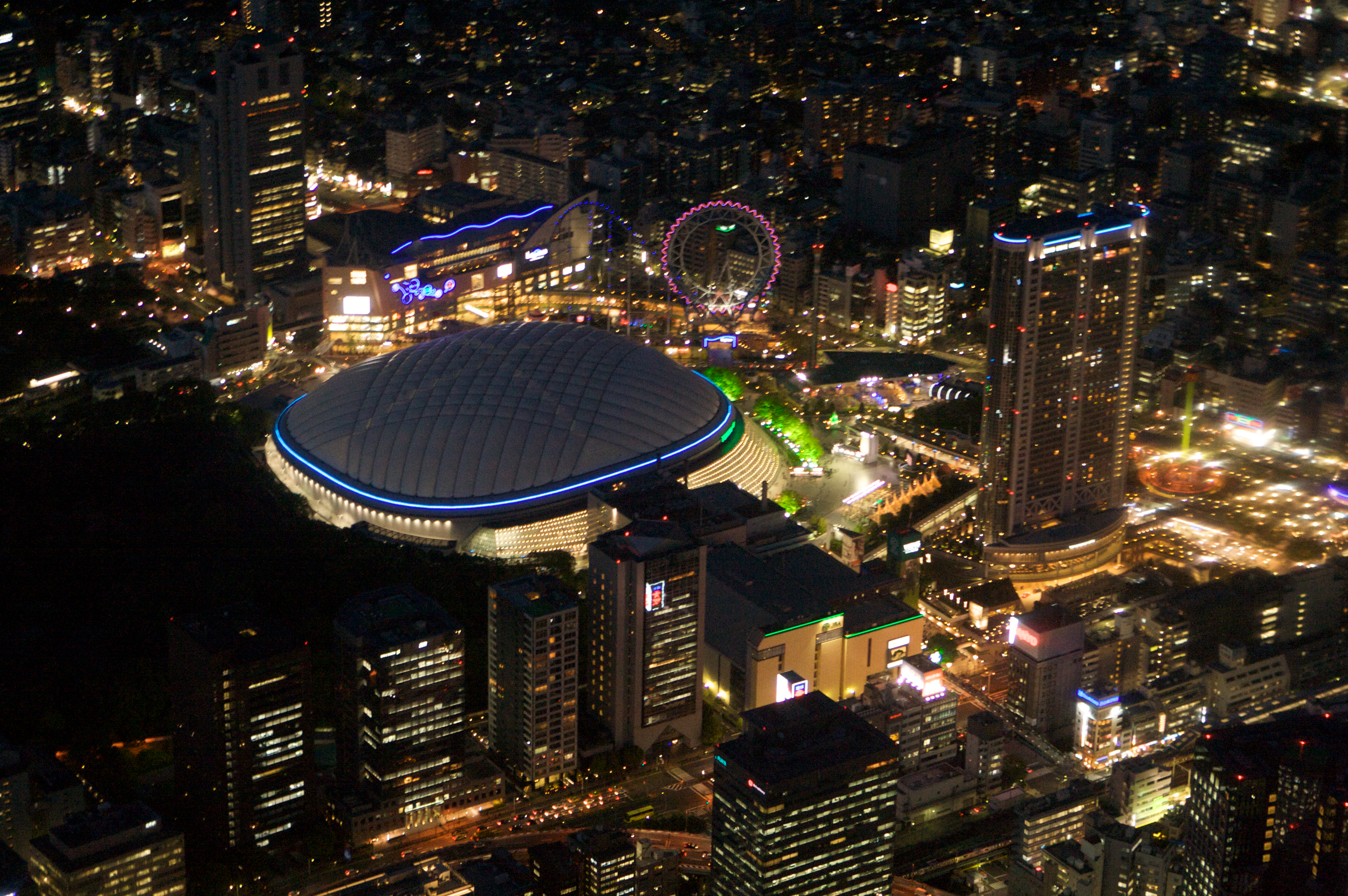
Tokyo Dome City Hall at night, the venue of Miss International 2022.

In 2022, the Miss International organization announced that the 2022 pageant would be held on 13 December 2022, in Tokyo Dome City Hall, Bunkyo, Tokyo, Japan, the competition's venue for the fifth consecutive year.

=== Location and date ===
On 15 January 2020, the Miss International organization announced that the pageant would be held on 21 October 2020 in Tokyo Dome City Hall, Bunkyo, Tokyo, Japan. However, due to the COVID-19 pandemic in Japan, it was announced on 12 June 2020 that the edition would be postponed. On 29 January 2021, due to the 2020 Summer Olympics scheduled in Tokyo from July to August 2021, the organization announced that the coronation night would be rescheduled for November 2021 in Pacifico Yokohama, Japan. On 31 August 2021, due to the rising cases caused by the SARS-CoV-2 Delta variant and the continuous COVID-19 travel restrictions would force contestants to have a 14-day quarantine in Japan, the organization announced that the edition would be rescheduled for the second time in late 2022.

=== Selection of participants ===
66 countries and territories have been selected to compete at the 60th anniversary of Miss International 2022 in Japan. This edition will have Beauties For SDGs as the theme to promote the United Nations's Sustainable Development Goals.

This edition saw the debut of Cape Verde and Uzbekistan, and the returns of Uruguay, which last competed in 1999; Greece and Jamaica in 2010; Namibia in 2012; Sierra Leone in 2017; and Cuba, Germany, Kenya and South Korea in 2018.

== Result ==
=== Placements ===
Placement	Contestant
Miss International 2022	Germany – Jasmin Selberg
1st runner-up	Cabo Verde – Stephany Amado §
2nd runner-up	Peru – Tatiana Calmell §
3rd runner-up	Colombia – Natalia López
4th runner-up	Dominican Republic – Celinee Santos
Top 8	Canada – Madison Kvaltin; Jamaica – Israel Harrison; Spain – Julianna Ro
Top 15	Costa Rica – Mahyla Roth; Finland – Anna Merimää; France – Maya Albert; New Zealand – Lydia Smit; Northern Mariana Islands – Savannah Delos Santos §; Philippines – Hannah Arnold; United Kingdom – Evanjelin Elchmanar

§ – Voted into the Top 15 by viewers

=== Continental queens ===
Award	Contestant
Miss International Africa	Cabo Verde – Stephany Amado
Miss International America	United States – Corrin Stellakis
Miss International Asia	Japan – Kiko Matsuo
Miss International Europe	Finland – Anna Merimää
Miss International Oceania	New Zealand – Lydia Smit

=== Special awards ===
Award	Contestant
Best in Evening Gown	Peru – Tatiana Calmell
Best in Swimsuit	United Kingdom – Evanjelin Elchmanar
Best National Costume	Uzbekistan – Nigina Fakhriddinova
Miss Photogenic	Ecuador – Valeria Gutiérrez

== Pageant ==
=== Judges ===
- Pawel Milewski — Ambassador Extraordinary and Plenipotentiary of the Republic of Poland to Japan
- Ryohei Miyata — Chairman of the Public Interest Incorporated Association, Nitten
- Dewi Sukarno — Socialite, former First Lady of Indonesia
- Junko Koshino — Fashion designer
- Norika Fujiwara — Miss Nippon 1992, model, and actress
- Supapan Pichaironarongsongkram — Chairwoman of Chao Phraya Express Boat
- Senko Ikenobo — Headmaster designate at Ikenobō
- Soujitsu Kobori — Head of Kobori Enshu school of tea
- Sireethorn Leearamwat — Miss International 2019 from Thailand
- Akemi Shimomura — President of the Miss International Organization

== Contestants ==
Sixty-six contestants competed for the title.

Country/Territory	Contestant	Age (Note: Ages at the time of the pageant)	Hometown
Australia	Anjelica Whitelaw	26	Adelaide
Belarus	Karyna Kisialiova	25	Minsk
Belgium	Lore Ven	27	Namur
Bolivia	Carolina Fernández	25	Cobija
Brazil	Isabella Oliveira	24	Rio de Janeiro
(Cape Verde) Cabo Verde	Stephany Amado	23	Mindelo
Cambodia	Charany Chea	28	Battambang
Canada	Madison Kvaltin	24	Toronto
Chile	Catalina Huenulao	24	Temuco
Colombia	Natalia López	23	Circasia
Costa Rica	Mahyla Roth	23	Cahuita
Cuba	Rachel Martín	22	Havana
Czech Republic	Adéla Maděryčová	24	Břeclav
Denmark	Dana Myrvig	26	Copenhagen
Dominican Republic	Celinee Santos	22	La Altagracia
Ecuador	Valeria Gutiérrez	23	Guayaquil
El Salvador	Génesis Fuentes	28	San Salvador
Finland	Anna Merimää	25	Turku
France	Maya Albert	26	Tarn
Germany	Jasmin Selberg	22	Dortmund
Greece	Anna Pavlidou	23	Thessaloniki
Guatemala	Dulce López	27	Huehuetenango
Haiti	Angélique François	26	Port-au-Prince
Hawaii	Priscilla Wang	28	Kailua-Kona
Honduras	Zully Paz	26	San Pedro Sula
Hong Kong	Rosemary Ling	24	Tai Po
India	Zoya Afroz	28	Lucknow
Indonesia	Cindy May McGuire	26	Jakarta
Italy	Beatrice Nardi	28	Parma
Jamaica	Israel Harrison	25	Clarendon
Japan	Kiko Matsuo	23	Nagasaki
Kenya	Cindy Isendi	25	Kakamega
Laos	Puangtip Malichanh	26	Luang Prabang
Macau	Dinelle Wong	27	Cotai
Malaysia	Giselle Tay	28	Kuala Lumpur
Mauritius	Ava Memero	25	Port Louis
Mexico	Yuridia Durán	23	Ahuacatlán
Mongolia	Nomin-Erdene Bayarkhuu	25	Darkhan
Namibia	Erika Kazombaruru	24	Swakopmund
Nepal	Nancy Khadka	24	Biratnagar
New Zealand	Lydia Smit	25	Morrinsville
Nicaragua	Fernanda Salazar	19	Managua
Nigeria	Precious Obisoso	24	Lagos
Northern Mariana Islands	Savannah Delos Santos	25	Saipan
Norway	Romée Dahlen	19	Bjørkelangen
Panama	Ivis Nicole Snyder	25	Los Santos
Paraguay	Ariane Maciel	28	Asunción
Peru	Tatiana Calmell	28	Talara
Philippines	Hannah Arnold	26	Balud
Poland	Sylwia Stasińska	24	Chełm
Portugal	Rita Reis	23	Lisbon
Puerto Rico	Paola González	20	San Sebastián
Romania	Ada-Maria Ileana	25	Bucharest
Singapore	Scarlett Sim	27	Tampines
Slovakia	Viktória Podmanická	21	Banská Bystrica
South Africa	Ferini Dayal	28	Kensington
South Korea	Sujin Kim	25	Daegu
Spain	Julianna Ro	28	Andalusia
Taiwan	Ting-Yi Cheng	27	Magong
Thailand	Ruechanok Meesang	28	Chonburi
Togo	Océane Bellow	25	Atakpamé
United Kingdom	Evanjelin Elchmanar	21	Birmingham
United States	Corrin Stellakis	25	Bridgeport
Uzbekistan	Nigina Fakhriddinova	23	Tashkent
Venezuela	Isbel Parra	28	Caracas
Vietnam	Phạm Ngọc Phương Anh	25	Hồ Chí Minh City
