= Lizeth González =

- Born: Lizeth Carolina González Romero; August 15, 1986 (age 40); Santa Marta, Colombia
- Height: 5 ft 9.5 in (1.77 m)
- Beauty pageant titleholder
- Title: Miss Magdalena 2010 (Winner); Reina Mundial del Banano 2011 (Winner)
- Hair color: Black
- Eye color: Brown
- Major competitions: Miss Colombia 2010 (1st runner-up); Top Model 2011 (Top 15); Miss Continente Americano 2011(Top 6)

Lizeth Carolina González Romero (born in Santa Marta, Colombia on 15 August 1986) Colombian model and beauty pageant titleholder who won several beauty contests, among which are, Magdalena 2010 and Miss World Banana Queen, currently holds the title of National Virreina (1 finalist), who won in the Miss Colombia 2010.

== Early life ==
Lizeth Carolina González Romero. Born in Plato. She is the daughter of Freddy Gonzalez Fernandez and Vilma Romero Navarro. She has two brothers, Freddy and Lauren. She speaks English and French and has knowledge of Italian. In her spare time is devoted to swimming, yoga and pilates. She was elected Miss Magdalena

== Miss Colombia ==
On November 15, 2010, 24 candidates from all departments of Colombia attended the Auditorium of the Convention Center Getsmani "Julio Cesar Turbay Ayala" in Cartagena, where was held the evening of election and coronation of Miss Colombia 2010, where Natalia Navarro Galvis crown to her successor Catalina Robayo, representative of the Valle del Cauca. In the various rounds (Costume Gala and Bath) Lizeth like Catalina 9.80 average score leaving them as potential escostaldas favorite of the night by Miss Huila, Natalia Valenzuela, Ms. Bolivar, Tatiana Najera and Miss Diana Mina Bogotá.

== Resignation in Miss International ==
In Colombia it is customary representation of the National Virreina in the Miss International beauty pageant which only supports candidates with 24 years of age on the date of the event, preventing Lizeth participate in this reign, giving you the chance to 1 st National Princess Natalia Valenzuela to represent Colombia.

== Top Model 2011 ==
Gonzalez represented Colombia at Top Model of the World 2011 contest had already been won by the Colombian Carolina Rodriguez Ferrero, The winner was the Romanian Loredana Salant, where Lizeth achieving a place in semifinals being among the top 10 ranked 9

== Reina Mundial del Banano 2011 ==
=== Winner ===
On 23 September this year in Ecuador Machala took out the competition World Banana Queen 2011, where 16 candidates from different countries where wins, as was the German viceroy Johanna Acs, Miss Argentina's friendship was Piñanelli Valentina, Miss Photogenic was the Canadian Shaota Elishia.

Awards and achievements
Preceded by Viviana Gómez	Miss Continente Americano Colombia; 2011	Succeeded by Anaa Melissa Cano
