= Miss International 2013 =

53rd Miss International competition, beauty pageant edition

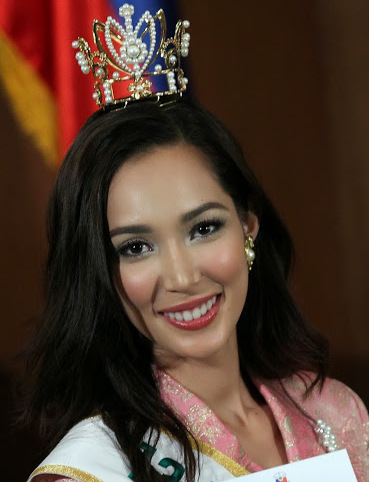
- Miss International 2013, Bea Santiago
- Date: December 17, 2013
- Presenters: Chris Peppler; Akiko Abe
- Venue: Shinagawa Prince Hotel Hall, Tokyo, Japan
- Broadcaster: UStream
- Entrants: 67
- Placements: 15
- Debuts: South Sudan
- Withdrawals: Argentina; Belarus; Belize; Cameroon; Denmark; France; Honduras; Israel; Latvia; Mauritius; Namibia; Sri Lanka; Turkey; United States Virgin Islands
- Returns: Aruba; China; Iceland; Kyrgyzstan; Lithuania; Luxembourg; Netherlands; Romania; South Africa; Tunisia; Vietnam
- Winner: Bea Santiago; Philippines

Miss International 2013 was the 53rd Miss International pageant, held at the Shinagawa Prince Hotel Hall in Tokyo, Japan, on December 17, 2013. This was the second consecutive year Japan hosted the pageant.

At the end of the event, Alejandra Andreu, Miss International 2008, crowned Bea Rose Santiago of the Philippines as Miss International 2013, it was the fifth victory of the Philippines in the pageant.

The incumbent titleholder Miss International 2012 Ikumi Yoshimatsu of Japan was barred from attending the event due to her involvement in a scandal where a media executive Genichi Taniguchi allegedly harassed and intimidated Ms. Yoshimatsu for not signing on to a talent agency with ties to the Japanese Yakuza or underworld.

== Background ==
On September 6, 2013, it was announced by Akemi Shimomura, the president of the International Cultural Association, that the 2013 pageant will be held in Shinagawa Prince Hotel Hall, Tokyo, Japan on December 17, 2013.

== Results ==
=== Placements ===
Placement	Contestant
Miss International 2013	Philippines – Bea Santiago
1st Runner-Up	Netherlands – Nathalie den Dekker
2nd Runner-Up	New Zealand – Casey Radley
3rd Runner-Up	Hungary – Brigitta Otvos
4th Runner-Up	Colombia – Lorena Hermida
Top 15	Brazil – Cristina Alves Da Silva; Ecuador – Nathaly Arroba; Gibraltar – Jamielee Randall §; Iceland – Sigrún Eva Ármannsdóttir; Lithuania – Elma Segzdaviciute; Puerto Rico – Ashley Beth Pérez; Russia – Olga Gaidabura; Spain – Araceli Carrilero; Thailand – Chointicha Tiengtham; United States – Andrea Neu

§ - Fan Vote Winner

== Contestants ==
Country/Territory	Contestant	Age	Hometown	Continental Group
Aruba	Erialda Croes	23	Oranjestad	Americas
Australia	Johanna Parker	23	Sydney	Oceania
Belgium	Ekaterina Sarafanova	21	Brussels	Europe
Bolivia	Adriana Delgadillo	22	Chuquisaca	Americas
Brazil	Cristina Alves Da Silva	24	Parnamirim	Americas
Canada	Sarah Ainsley Harrison	25	Ottawa	Americas
China	Jin Ying	22	Beijing	Asia
Colombia	Lorena Hermida	24	Pitalito	Americas
Costa Rica	Andrea Rojas	21	Palmares	Americas
Dominican Republic	Carmen Muñoz Guzmán	21	Licey al Medio	Americas
Ecuador	Nathaly Arroba Hurtado	23	Guayaquil	Americas
El Salvador	Yaritza Rivera	19	San Salvador	Americas
Estonia	Madli Vilsar	22	Kuressaare	Europe
Finland	Helianna Ylimaula	23	Siuntio	Europe
Gabon	Reilly Makaya	24	Tchibanga	Africa
Germany	Oksana Koroleva	22	Berlin	Europe
Gibraltar	Jamielee Randall	22	Gibraltar	Europe
Guadeloupe	Megane Monrose	18	Basse-Terre	Americas
Guam	Lirone Veksler	20	Hagåtña	Oceania
Guatemala	Sara Guerrero	24	Salamá	Americas
Haiti	Clara Luce Lafond	21	Port-au-Prince	Americas
Hong Kong	Moon Lau	22	Hong Kong	Asia
Hungary	Brigitta Ötvös	21	Budapest	Europe
Iceland	Sigrún Eva Ármannsdóttir	20	Akranes	Europe
India	Gurleen Grewal	21	Chandigarh	Asia
Indonesia	Marisa Sartika Maladewi	20	Palembang	Asia
Italy	Sara Cavagnari	25	Reggio Emilia	Europe
Japan	Yukiko Takahashi	24	Tokyo	Asia
Kyrgyzstan	Meerim Erkinbayeva	22	Bishkek	Asia
Lebanon	Layla Yarak	21	Beirut	Asia
Lithuania	Elma Segzdavičiūtė	18	Vilnius	Europe
Luxembourg	Corrine Semedo Furtado	23	Luxembourg	Europe
Macau	Adela Ka-Wai Sou	23	Macau	Asia
Malaysia	Charissa Chong Su Huey	19	Kuala Lumpur	Asia
Mexico	Miroslava Montemayor	23	Monterrey	Americas
Mongolia	Anu Namshir	22	Ulan Bator	Asia
Myanmar	Gonyi Aye Kyaw	22	Mandalay	Asia
Nepal	Shritima Shah	21	Kathmandu	Asia
Netherlands	Nathalie den Dekker	23	Amstelveen	Europe
New Zealand	Casey Radley	20	Auckland	Oceania
Nicaragua	Celeste Castillo	19	Managua	Americas
Panama	Betzy Madrid	19	Panama City	Americas
Paraguay	Marta Raviolo	22	Coronel Oviedo	Americas
Peru	Maria Gracia Figueroa	23	Lima	Americas
Philippines	Bea Santiago	23	Cataingan	Asia
Poland	Katarzyna Oracka	25	Warsaw	Europe
Portugal	Ana Claudia Ornelas	20	Lisbon	Europe
Puerto Rico	Ashley Beth Pérez	22	San Juan	Americas
Romania	Diana Maria Tiron	19	Bucharest	Europe
Russia	Olga Gaidabura	20	Bashkortostan	Europe
Singapore	Jia Min Chew	23	Singapore	Asia
Slovak Republic	Nikoleta Duchoňová	19	Trebatice	Europe
South Africa	Cindy Rosslind	23	Cape Town	Africa
South Korea	Han Ji-eun	21	Incheon	Asia
South Sudan	Ayak Abiel	22	Juba	Africa
Spain	Araceli Carrilero Martínez	21	Albacete	Europe
Suriname	Cherelen Van Bastasa	22	Paramaribo	Americas
Sweden	Eleonore Lilja	20	Stockholm	Europe
Tahiti	Ohana Huber	20	Papeete	Oceania
Taiwan	Xiao-wen Chen	22	Taipei	Asia
Thailand	Chonticha Tiengtham	18	Chonburi	Asia
Tunisia	Sondes Zamouri	24	Menzel Bourguiba	Africa
Ukraine	Margaryta Gorbyk	23	Kyiv	Europe
United Kingdom	Elizabeth Greenham	20	Ferndale	Europe
United States	Andrea Neu	23	Durango	Americas
Venezuela	Elián Herrera	22	Cagua	Americas
Vietnam	Lô Thị Hương Trâm	24	Nghệ An	Asia

== Notes ==
=== Replacements ===
- Lebanon - Deedee Zibara was replaced by Layla Yarak, the 1st runner-up after Zibara could not compete due to some serious issues between her and the committee.
