= Melissa Varón =

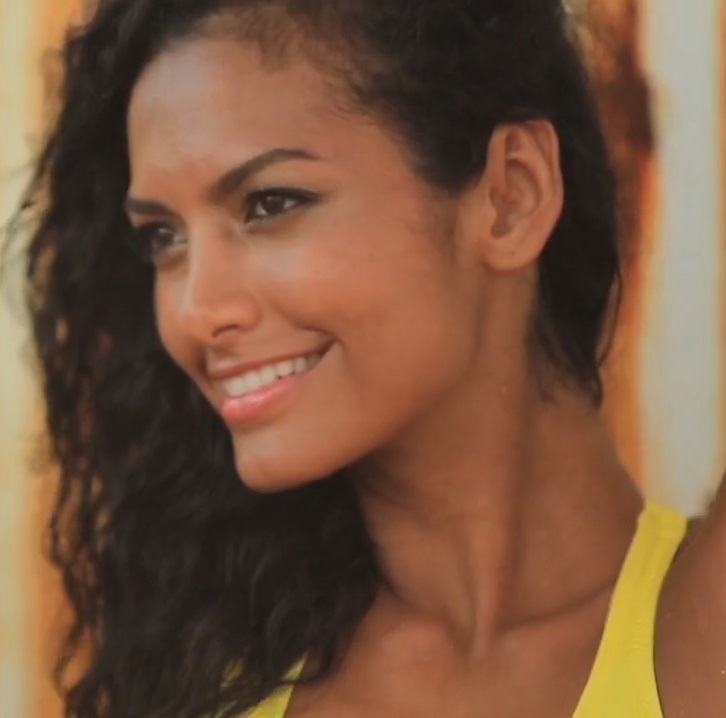
- Born: Melissa Carolina Varón Ballesteros; February 26, 1989 (age 37); Santa Marta, Magdalena, Colombia
- Height: 5 ft 11 in (1.80 m)
- Beauty pageant titleholder
- Title: Miss Magdalena 2011; Miss International Colombia 2012
- Hair color: Dark
- Eye color: Brown
- Major competitions: Miss Colombia 2011 (1st Runner-Up); Miss International 2012 (Top 15)

Melissa Carolina Varón Ballesteros (born Melissa Varón on February 26, 1989 in Santa Marta, Colombia) is a Colombian model and beauty pageant pageant titleholder first runner-up of the Miss Colombia 2011 and formally representative of Colombia Miss International 2012.

== Early life ==
Melissa studied Chemical Engineering at the National University of Colombia in Medellin and has toured many parts of Colombia due to her profession. Melissa is fluent in English. She is the daughter of Marcos Varón Rodriguez (†) and Aidee Armenta Ballesteros, and her sister is Nataly Varón. Her height is 5 feet 11 inches (1.80 m) and her measurements are 86-62-90, with swarthy skin and dark brown eyes.

== Pageantry ==
=== Miss Colombia 2011 ===
In the 2011–2012 Miss Colombia pageant edition, Melissa won the Miss Elegance Primatela. She later began to be considered as a favorite for the crown along with the representatives from the departments of Valle and Atlántico. On the night of the 14 of November in Cartagena She received the second best score (9.50) at the evening gown gala giving her the right to follow onto the swimsuit phase where she was named first runner-up. The response proved to be safe and direct earning her public confidence and the jury gave her the title of National Beauty Virreina of Colombia 2011–2012, and curiously, last year Lizeth González of Magdalena (the same department Melissa represented) achieved this very same position.

=== Miss International 2012 ===
Melissa represented Colombia at the Miss International 2012 in Okinawa, Japan where she placed among the 15 semi-finalists.

Awards and achievements
Preceded by Natalia Valenzuela	Miss International Colombia; 2011	Succeeded by Lorena Hermida
Preceded by Lizeth González	Miss Magdalena; 2011	Succeeded by Adriana Vidal
