= Amaliya =

Amaliya is a given name. Notable people with the name include:

- Amaliya Mamedova (born 2008), Uzbekistani rhythmic gymnast
- Amaliya Panahova (1945–2018), Azerbaijani film and stage actress
- Amaliya Shakirova (born 1995), Uzbekistan model, singer, ambassador, and beauty pageant titleholder
- Amaliya Sharoyan (born 1988), Armenian athlete
