= Miss Colombia 2011 =

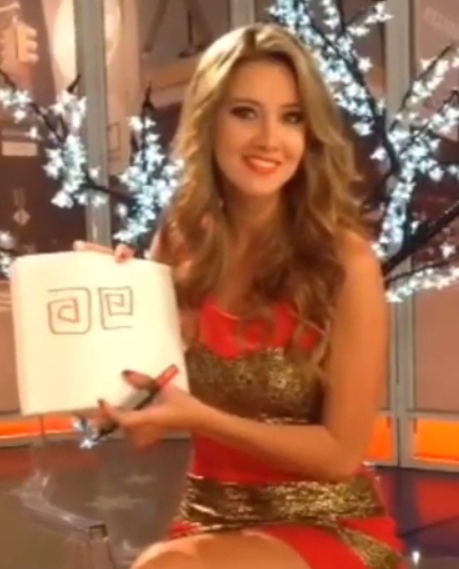
- Daniella Álvarez, Miss Colombia 2011
- Date: 14 November 2011
- Presenters: Andrea Serna, Carolina Cruz, Carlos Calero, Carolina Rodríguez Ferrero
- Entertainment: Daddy Yankee
- Venue: Auditorio Barahona, Centro de Convenciones Julio César Turbay, Cartagena de Indias
- Broadcaster: RCN TV
- Entrants: 26
- Placements: 10
- Withdrawals: Córdoba
- Returns: Arauca; Boyacá; Caquetá
- Winner: Daniella Álvarez; Atlántico
- Congeniality: Estefanía Díaz-Granados; Quindío
- Best National Costume: Jennifer Martínez; Cauca
- Photogenic: Laura Marcela Cantillo; Cartagena

Miss Colombia 2011 was the 59th edition of the Miss Colombia pageant. It was held on 14 November 2011 in Cartagena, Colombia.

At the end of the event, Catalina Robayo of Valle crowned Daniella Álvarez of Atlántico as Miss Colombia 2011. She represented Colombia in Miss Universe 2012 but failed to place in the semi-finals.

== Results ==
Color keys

- The contestant was a Finalist/Runner-up in an International pageant.
- The contestant was a Semi-Finalist in an International pageant.
- The contestant did not place.

Placement	Contestant	International placement
Miss Colombia 2011	Atlántico – Daniella Álvarez	Unplaced – Miss Universe 2012
1st runner-up	Magdalena – Melissa Carolina Varón	Top 15 – Miss International 2012
2nd runner-up	Valle del Cauca – Melina Ramirez Serna	2nd runner-up – Top Model of the World 2011/2012
3rd runner-up	Cartagena – Laura Marcela Cantillo	1st runner-up – Miss America Latina 2013
4th runner-up	Cundinamarca – Thael Lisney Osorio	
Top 10	Caquetá – Lizeth Mendieta; Cauca – Jennifer Martínez; Norte de Santander – Mayra Alejandra Osorio; Sucre – Helena Sofía Fadúl; Tolima – Piedad Alexandra Herrera	

=== Special awards ===
Award	Contestant
Queen of the Police	Valle del Cauca – Melina Ramírez Serna
Best Body	Cundinamarca – Thael Osorio Redondo
Best Face	Valle del Cauca – Melina Ramírez Serna
Oster Challenge	Valle del Cauca – Melina Ramírez Serna; Cesar – Maria Laura Quintero (tie)
Miss Punctuality	Cundinamarca – Thael Osorio Redondo
Miss Elegance	Magdalena – Melissa Carolina Varón
Best Regional Costume	Cauca – Jennifer Martínez (Judges' Vote); Valle del Cauca – Melina Ramírez Serna (Online Vote)
Zapatilla Real	Cesar – Maria Laura Quintero
Miss Photogenic	Cartagena – Laura Marcela Cantillo
Natural Beauty	Valle del Cauca – Melina Ramírez Serna
Miss Congeanilaty	Quindío – Estefanía Díaz-Granados

== Contestants ==
Twenty-six contestants competed for the title.

Department/City	Contestant	Age	Hometown
Antioquia	Olivia Aristizábal Echeverri	21	Medellín
Arauca	Gina Valentina Diaz Mantilla	20	Arauca
Atlántico	Daniella Álvarez Vásquez	23	Barranquilla
Bogotá	Melissa Cano Rey	21	Sogamoso
Bolívar	Roxana Fortich González	24	Cartagena de Indias
Boyaca	Lina María Gallego Bejarano	19	Puerto Boyacá
Caldas	Valentina Muñoz Escobar	22	Manizales
Caquetá	Lizeth Mendieta Villanueva	20	Florencia
Cartagena	Laura Marcela Cantillo Torres	20	Cartagena de Indias
Cauca	Jennifer Martínez Martínez	23	Popayán
Cesar	María Laura Quintero Dangond	22	Valledupar
Chocó	Yesica Paola Montoya Valencia	21	Turbo
Cundinamarca	Thael Osorio Redondo	22	Barranquilla
La Guajira	Vanessa Carolina Choles Vidal	20	Riohacha
Huila	Daniela Villaveces Díaz	22	Neiva
Magdalena	Melissa Carolina Varón Ballesteros	24	Santa Marta
Meta	Sara Daniela Villarreal Pineda	18	Villavicencio
Nariño	Catalina Lasso Ortiz	23	San Juan de Pasto
Norte de Santander	Mayra Alejandra Osorio Chávez	21	Cúcuta
Quindío	Estefanía Díaz Granados Gallo	20	Medellín
Risaralda	Tatiana Ángel Ilian	24	Bogotá
San Andrés and Providencia	Cindy Lane May Escalona	21	San Andrés
Santander	Andrea Liseth Tavera Sanabria	22	Bucaramanga
Sucre	Helena Sofía Fadul Bolaños	19	Sincelejo
Tolima	Piedad Alexandra Herrera Avendaño	22	Bello
Valle del Cauca	Melina Ramírez Serna	21	Cali
