= Miss World Germany =

Beauty pageant

Deutschlands Schönste Miss World Germany
- Formation: 1992
- Type: Beauty pageant
- Headquarters: Duderstadt
- Location: Germany
- Members: Miss World
- Official language: German
- National Director: Miss From Germany

Miss World Germany is a national Beauty pageant in Germany to select an official candidate for the Miss World pageant.

== History ==
Between 1951 and 1991 the Miss Germany winner went to Miss World. In 1989 German beauty pageant for Miss World has been built but Miss Germany Company select the official representative from Miss World Germany pageant for first time in 1992. Since 2000, the pageant changed name as German's Miss World pageant until 2001. In 2002–2007, Miss World Germany pageant selected the winner as Miss World Germany. In 2008-2009 it changed as Miss World Deutschland to Schönste in 2010-presents, after in 2014 changed to Miss Deutschland Organisation and 2018 to SHOWSTARS.

== Titleholders ==
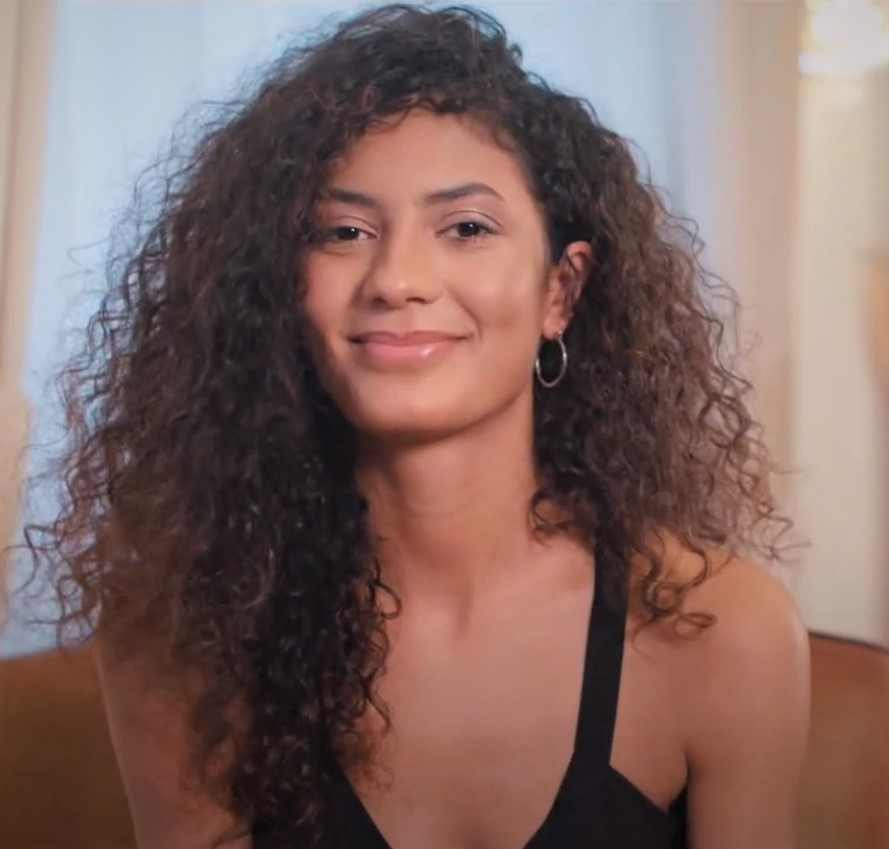
Dalila Jabri, Miss World Germany 2017

Color key

- Declared as Winner
- Ended as runner-up
- Ended as one of the finalists or semifinalists

| Year | Miss World Germany | Represented | Site of Election | Placement | Special Awards |
|---|---|---|---|---|---|
| 2010 | Susanna Marie Kobylinski | Bremen | Berlin | Top 25 | |
| 2011 | Sabrina-Nathalie Reitz | Hesse | Berlin | Unplaced | |
| 2012 | Martina Ivezaj | Bavaria | Berlin | Unplaced | |
| 2013 | Amina Sabbah | Thuringia | Berlin | Unplaced | |
| 2014 | Egzonita Ala | Berlin | Berlin | Unplaced | |
| 2015 | Albjona Muharremaj | Bavaria | Berlin | Unplaced | |
| 2016 | Selina Kriechbaum | Hesse | Frankfurt | Unplaced | |
| 2017 | Dalila Jabri | North Rhine-Westphalia | Hamm | Unplaced | |
| 2018 | Christine Annabelle Keller | Cologne | Düsseldorf | Unplaced | Top 32 at Miss World Top Model |
| 2023 | Aleksandra Modić | Hesse | Wetzlar | Unplaced | |
| 2025 | Silvia Dörre Sánchez | Saxony | Leipzig | Unplaced | |
| 2026 | Julia Kuehnle | Berlin | Berlin | Top 40 | |

=== 2008-2009: Miss World Deutschland ===
| Year | Miss World Germany | Represented | Site of Election | Placement | Special Awards |
|---|---|---|---|---|---|
| 2008 | Anne Katrin Walter | Schleswig-Holstein | Erfurt | Unplaced | |
| 2009 | Alessandra Alores | North Rhine-Westphalia | Moers | Unplaced | |

=== 2002-2007: Miss Germany World ===
| Year | Miss World Germany | Represented | Site of Election | Placement | Special Awards |
|---|---|---|---|---|---|
| 2002 | Indira Selmic | Berlin | Berlin | Unplaced | |
| 2003 | Babett Konau | Berlin | Berlin | Unplaced | |
| 2004 | Inka Weickel | Berlin | Berlin | Unplaced | |
| 2005 | Daniela Risch | Berlin | Berlin | Unplaced | |
| 2006 | Edita Orascanin | Berlin | Berlin | Unplaced | |
| 2007 | Janice Behrendt | Berlin | Berlin | Unplaced | |

=== 2000-2001: German's Miss World - MGC ===
| Year | Miss World Germany | Represented | Site of Election | Placement | Special Awards |
|---|---|---|---|---|---|
| 2000 | Natascha Berg | Hesse | Hannover | Unplaced | |
| 2001 | Adina Wilhelmi | Baden-Württemberg | Hannover | Unplaced | |

=== 1992-1999: Miss World Germany - MGC ===
| Year | Miss World Germany | Represented | Site of Election | Placement | Special Awards |
|---|---|---|---|---|---|
| 1992 | Carina Jope | Hesse | | Unplaced | |
| 1993 | Petra Klein | Rheinland-Pfalz | | Unplaced | |
| 1994 | Marte Helberg | Hamburg | | Unplaced | |
| 1995 | Isabell Brauer | Baden-Württemberg | Köln | Unplaced | |
| 1996 | Melanie Ernst | Baden-Württemberg | Köln | Unplaced | |
| 1997 | Katja Glawe | Berlin | Berlin | Unplaced | |
| 1998 | Sandra Ahrabian | Bavaria | Mannheim | Unplaced | |
| 1999 | Susan Hoecke | Berlin | München | Unplaced | |

=== 1952-1991 ===
| Year | Miss World Germany | Placement | Special Awards |
|---|---|---|---|
| 1952 | Vera Marks | 2nd Runner-up | |
| 1953 | Wilma Kanders | Unplaced | |
| 1954 | Frauke Walther | 4th Runner-up | |
| 1955 | Beate Kruger | Unplaced | |
| 1956 | Petra Schürmann | Miss World 1956 | |
| 1957 | Annemarie Karsten | Unplaced | |
| 1958 | Dagmar Herner | Top 10 | |
| 1959 | Helga Meyer | Unplaced | |
| 1960 | Ingrun Helgard Möckel | 3rd Runner-up | |
| 1961 | Romy März | Top 15 | |
| 1962 | Anita Steffen | Unplaced | |
| 1963 | Susie Gruner | Unplaced | |
| 1964 | Juliane Herm | Top 16 | |
| 1965 | Karin Schütze | Top 16 | |
| 1966 | Jutta Danske | Top 16 | |
| 1967 | Ruth Köcher | 6th Runner-up | |
| 1968 | Margot Schmalzriedt | Top 15 | |
| 1969 | Christa Margraf | 2nd Runner-up | |
| 1970 | Dagmar Eva Ruthenberg | Unplaced | |
| 1971 | Irene Neumann | Unplaced | |
| 1972 | Heidemarie Renate Weber | Unplaced | |
| 1974 | Sabrina Erlmeier | Unplaced | |
| 1975 | Marina Langner | 1st Runner-up | |
| 1976 | Monika Schneeweiss | Unplaced | |
| 1977 | Dagmar Winkler | 2nd Runner-up | |
| 1978 | Monika Greis | Unplaced | |
| 1979 | Andrea Hontschik | Top 15 | |
| 1980 | Gabriella Brum | Miss World 1980 | |
| 1981 | Barbara Reimund | Unplaced | |
| 1982 | Kerstin Natalie Paeserack | Unplaced | |
| 1983 | Claudia Zielinski | Unplaced | |
| 1984 | Brigitta Berx | Unplaced | |
| 1985 | Marion Morell | Unplaced | |
| 1986 | Dagmar Schulz | Unplaced | |
| 1987 | Christiane Kopp | Unplaced | |
| 1988 | Katja Munch | Unplaced | |
| 1989 | Jasmine Bell | Unplaced | |
| 1990 | Christiane Stocker | Unplaced | |
| 1991 | Susanne Petry | Unplaced | |

== See also ==
- Miss Germany
- Miss Universe Germany
- Miss International Germany
- Miss Earth Germany
