= Lorena Hermida =

Colombian model and beauty pageant titleholder

- Born: Cindy Lorena Hermida Aguilar; December 9, 1988 (age 37); Pitalito, Huila, Colombia
- Height: 5 ft 9.5 in (1.77 m)
- Beauty pageant titleholder
- Title: Miss Huila 2012; Miss International Colombia 2012
- Hair color: Dark
- Eye color: Brown
- Major competitions: Miss Colombia 2012 (1st Runner-Up); Miss International 2013 (4th Runner-Up)

Cindy Lorena Hermida Aguilar (born December 9, 1988 in Pitalito, Colombia) is a Colombian model and beauty pageant titleholder who placed first runner-up at Miss Colombia 2012 and representative of Colombia Miss International 2013

== Early life ==
Lorena studied business administration at the National Unified Corporation of Neiva. Lorena is studying English, play tennis, football and basketball. Hermida is the daughter of Oliver and Geovanna Aguilar Trujillo. Her height is 5 feet part with 9 1/2 inches, their body measurements are 34.3 - 25.4 - 39, having a swarthy skin and dark brown eyes.

== Life Beauty Queen ==
=== Miss Colombia 2012 ===
On the night of the November 12 in Cartagena she received one of the highest scores (9.70) at the evening gown gala where she was named first runner-up. For the first time in the 78 years of the contest, a representative of Huila reaches as prominent position thus achieving higher the position in the tournament's history. The response proved to be safe and direct earning her public confidence and the jury gave her the title of National Beauty Virreina of Colombia 2012-2013, and curiously, two years ago Natalia Valenzuela of Huila (the same department Lorena represented) achieved second runner-up position.

=== Miss International 2013 ===
Lorena represented Colombia in Miss International 2013 and got the fifth place.

Awards and achievements
Preceded by Melissa Varón	Miss International Colombia; 2013	Succeeded by Zuleika Suarez Torrenegra
Preceded by Daniela Villaveces	Miss Huila; 2012	Succeeded by María Juliana Silva Sinning
