= Tatiana Najera =

Colombian model

- Born: Tatiana Najera Cardona; July 17, 1988 (age 38); Cartagena, Bolivar, Colombia
- Height: 5 ft 9 in (1.75 m)
- Beauty pageant titleholder
- Title: Miss Bolivar 2010; Miss Intercontinental 2011
- Hair color: Brown
- Eye color: Hazel
- Major competition: Miss Colombia 2010 (3rd runner-up)

Tatiana Najera Cardona (born July 17, 1988) is a Colombian model, who was a Miss Colombia 2010 contestant, where she was the third place finalist.

== Personal life ==
She was born in Cartagena de Indias. She has a master's degree in international business and integration and a bachelor's degree in political sciences. She is fluent in English, French, Spanish, and Portuguese and has knowledge of Italian.

== Miss Colombia ==
Cardona's charisma and smile led her to get 9.7 in the evening dress category and 9.7 in bathing suit. She was given the honor of representing Colombia at Miss Intercontinental.

Awards and achievements
Preceded by Natalia Navarro	Miss Bolívar; 2010	Succeeded by Roxana Fortich
