= Amaliya Shakirova =

Uzbekistani fashion model and beauty queen (born 1996)

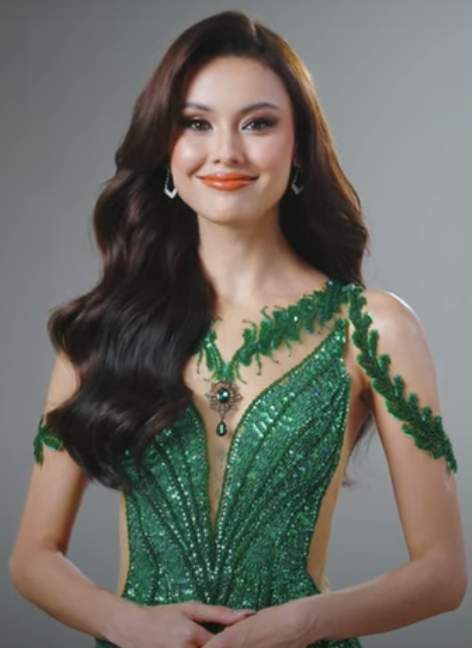
- Amaliya Shakirova 2023
- Born: Amaliya Shukhratovna Shakirova; Tashkent, Uzbekistan
- Education: Yunusabad District Professional College Of Design
- Occupations: Beauty pageant titleholder; model; singer; television; personality
- Height: 1.77 m (5 ft 10 in)
- Beauty pageant titleholder
- Title: Miss Grand Uzbekistan 2023
- Hair color: Dark Brown
- Eye color: Brown
- Major competitions: Miss CosmoWorld 2022; (1st runner-up); Miss Grand Uzbekistan 2023; (Winner); Miss Grand International 2023; (Top 20)

Amaliya Shakirova (born 1995) is an Uzbekistani model, singer, advocate, ambassador, and beauty pageant titleholder best known for winning the title of Miss Grand Uzbekistan 2023. After winning the national competition, Shakirova competed at Miss Grand International 2023, becoming the first Uzbek queen to participate in the pageant.

== Early life and education ==
Amaliya Shakirova was born and raised in Tashkent, the capital of Uzbekistan, in a family with mixed racial and religious backgrounds. She grew up with her mother, grandmother, and grandfather. From a young age, Shakirova was passionate about performing, often standing on a chair to give performances for her family. She also engaged in tennis and professional swimming classes during her childhood. By the age of thirteen, Amaliya began traveling as a model, living independently, and graduated from the Professional College of Design.

== Personal life ==
Amaliya Shakirova married Filipino Carlos Alberto “Chuck” De Jesus Oreta on January 11, 2025.

== Career ==
=== Modeling career ===
Amaliya's modeling career started at the age of 13 when she was scouted by Figaro Agency, which was formerly based in Uzbekistan and is currently located in Malaysia. She moved to Malaysia to pursue modeling at the age of 16. In addition to modeling, Shakirova enjoys dancing, singing, scuba-diving, jet-skiing, ice-skating, and traveling. She is a student in an English program and aims to become multilingual, including learning the Malay language. Shakirova works as a part-time model and has walked the runway for major fashion brands in countries such as Japan and Italy. She currently resides in Manila, Philippines.

=== Entrepreneurial ventures ===
In Malaysia, Shakirova launched "Amaliya Atelier," a fashion brand that fuses Uzbekistani and Malaysian cultures.

=== Media Appearances ===
Shakirova has expanded her career by appearing in a music video by the group Bojalar and modeling for Bridalwear in Bohol I Do in 2024. Additionally, she has modeled for fashion designer Paul Cabral, featured in Philippine Tatler in 2024. Amaliya gained significant media attention in the Philippines after singing a Tagalog song. She works as a commercial and fashion model.

=== Humanitarian work ===
Shakirova is an ambassador for Amal THZ, a charity organization working with orphans in Malaysia. She is an advocate for Ocean Hero Conservation. She is committed to being a role model in advocating and volunteering for the “Stop the War and Violence” campaign.

== Pageantry ==
=== Miss CosmoWorld 2022 ===
In 2022, despite having only two weeks to prepare, Shakirova was the first runner-up at Miss CosmoWorld and won the Best Creativity award in Kuala Lumpur, Malaysia.

=== Miss Grand International 2023 ===
By winning the Miss Grand Uzbekistan 2023 pageant, Shakirova earned the right to compete in the eleventh edition of Miss Grand International 2023, representing her country. She competed in Miss Grand International held in Ho Chi Minh City, Vietnam, on October 25, where she ended her journey in the pageant placing in the Top 20 out of sixty-nine contestants.

Awards and achievements
Preceded by (Taiwan) Joyce Chao	Miss CosmoWorld; 2022	Succeeded by (Philippines) Elda Aznar
Preceded by (Uzbekistan) Nigina Fakhriddinova	Miss Uzbekistan; 2023	Incumbent
