= Miss Colombia 2010 =

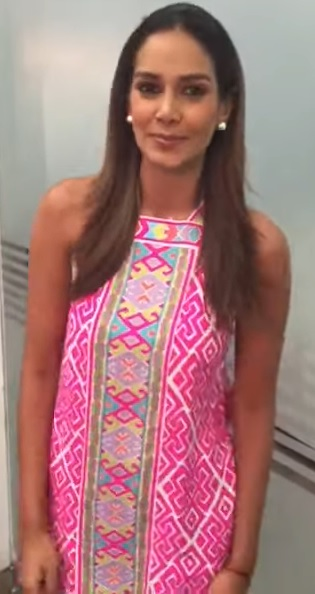
- Catalina Robayo, Miss Colombia 2010
- Date: November 15, 2010
- Presenters: Andrea Serna, Carolina Cuz, Carlos Calero
- Entertainment: Fonseca, Willie Colón
- Venue: Auditorio Getsemaní - Centro de Convenciones Julio César Turbay Ayala Cartagena de Indias, Colombia
- Broadcaster: RCN TV
- Entrants: 24
- Winner: Catalina Robayo; Valle del Cauca

Miss Colombia 2010 was the 58th edition of the Miss Colombia pageant. It was held on November 15, 2010 in Cartagena, Colombia.

At the end of the event, Natalia Navarro of Bolívar crowned Catalina Robayo of Valle as Miss Colombia 2010. She represented Colombia in Miss Universe 2011 and placed in the Top 16.

== Results ==
Color keys

- The contestant won in an International pageant.
- The contestant was a Semi-Finalist in an International pageant.
- The contestant did not place.

Placement	Contestants	International placement
Miss Colombia 2010	Valle – Catalina Robayo	Top 16 – Miss Universe 2011
1st Runner-Up	Magdalena – Lizeth González	Winner – Reina Mundial del Banano 2011 Top 6 – Miss Continente Americano 2011 Top 15 – Top Model of the World 2011
2nd Runner-Up	Huila – Natalia Valenzuela	Unplaced – Miss International 2011
3rd Runner-Up	Bolívar – Tatiana Nájera	Unplaced – Miss Intercontinental 2011
4th Runner-Up	Bogotá – Diana Juliette Mina	Unplaced - Reina Hispanoamericana 2011
Top 10	Antioquia – Natalia Isabel Gallo; Atlántico – Laura Victoria Jesurun; Cesar – Marisabella Mendoza; Meta – Nohora Zamira Restrepo; Norte de Santander – Dayana Zamar Delgado	

== Special awards ==
Award	Winner
Queen of the Police (Reina de la Policía)	Huila - Natalia Valenzuela Cutiva
Best Body (Figura Bodytech)	Huila - Natalia Valenzuela Cutiva
Best Face (Rostro Jolie)	Cesar - Marisabella Mendoza Cabello
Miss Punctuality (Señorita Puntualidad Edox)	Sucre - María Paulina Castro Monterroza
Miss Elegance (Señorita Elegancia Primatela)	Valle - María Catalina Robayo Vargas
Best Regional Costume (Mejor Traje Artesanal)	Antioquia - Natalia Isabel Gallo Jaramillo
Zapatilla Real	Caldas - Gloria Daniela Castellanos Marin
Miss Photogenic (Señorita Fotogenica)	Santander - Laura Melissa Patiño Contreras
Natural Beauty (Belleza Natural)	Huila - Natalia Valenzuela Cutiva
Miss Congeanilaty (Mejor Compañera)	Cauca - Annie Violeta Bergonzi Gómez

== Scores ==
Legend
Miss Colombia 2010
1st Runner-up
2nd Runner-up
3rd Runner-up
4th Runner-up
Top 10

Department	Evening Gown	Swimsuit	Average
Valle	9.8 (1)	9.8 (1)	9.80 (1)
Magdalena	9.8 (1)	9.8 (1)	9.80 (1)
Bolívar	9.7 (3)	9.7 (3)	9.70 (3)
Huila	9.7 (3)	9.6 (4)	9.65 (4)
Bogotá	9.4 (5)	9.6 (4)	9.50 (5)
Cesar	9.3 (6)	9.3 (7)	9.30 (6)
Norte de Santander	9.1 (9)	9.4 (6)	9.25 (7)
Antioquia	9.2 (7)	9.2 (8)	9.20 (8)
Atlántico	9.2 (7)	9.1 (10)	9.15 (9)
Meta	9.0 (10)	9.2 (8)	9.10 (10)
Guajira	8.7		
Risaralda	8.7		
Santander	8.7		
Tolima	8.7		
Cundinamarca	8.6		
Cartagena	8.4		
Caldas	8.3		
Cauca	8.3		
Nariño	8.3		
Chocó	8.2		
Córdoba	8.2		
Quindío	8.2		
San Andrés	8.2		
Sucre	8.2		

== Delegates ==
24 delegates have been selected to compete.

Department	Name	Age	Height	Hometown
Antioquia	Natalia Isabel Gallo Jaramillo	21	175 cm (5 ft 9 in)	Medellín
Atlántico	Laura Victoria Jesurun Saade	21	174 cm (5 ft 8 1/2 in)	Barranquilla
Bogotá D.C.	Diana Juliette Mina Tocora	20	175 cm (5 ft 9 in)	Riohacha
Bolívar	Tatiana Nájera Cardona	22	173 cm (5 ft 8 in)	Cartagena de Indias
Caldas	Gloria Daniela Castellanos Marín	21	168 cm (5 ft 6 in)	Manizales
Cartagena, D.T. and C.	Karen Margarita Visbal Barrios	21	174 cm (5 ft 8 1/2 in)	Cartagena de Indias
Cauca	Annie Violeta Bergonzi Gómez	22	177 cm (5 ft 9 1/2 in)	París
Cesar	Marisabella Mendoza Cabello	24	169 cm (5 ft 6 1/2 in)	Valledupar
Chocó	Astrid Vanessa Fernández Murillo	20	176 cm (5 ft 9 1/2 in)	Medellín
Córdoba	Marcia Jones Brango	21	170 cm (5 ft 7 in)	Montería
Cundinamarca	Ana María Santa Caldas	19	173 cm (5 ft 8 in)	Cartagena de Indias
Guajira	Vanessa Sofía Durán Daza	22	173 cm (5 ft 8 in)	Barranquilla
Huila	Natalia Valenzuela Cutiva	21	177 cm (5 ft 9 1/2 in)	Neiva
Magdalena	Lizeth Carolina González Romero	24	175 cm (5 ft 9 in)	Santa Marta
Meta	Nohora Zamira Restrepo Castro	20	171 cm (5 ft 7 1/2 in)	Villavicencio
Nariño	Estefany Ceballos Montenegro	18	175 cm (5 ft 9 in)	Ipiales
Norte de Santander	Dayana Zamar Delgado Contreras	23	170 cm (5 ft 7 in)	San José de Cúcuta
Quindío	Karen Lizeth Gutiérrez González	20	178 cm (5 ft 10 in)	Armenia
Risaralda	Verónica Yepes Uribe	22	172 cm (5 ft 7 1/2 in)	Pereira
San Andrés, P. and S.C.	Luisa Fernanda Gallardo Canchila	22	170 cm (5 ft 7 in)	San Andrés
Santander	Laura Melissa Patiño Contreras	22	175 cm (5 ft 9 in)	Bucaramanga
Sucre	María Paulina Castro Monterroza	24	168 cm (5 ft 6 in)	Sincelejo
Tolima	Nicole Suárez Campos	19	166 cm (5 ft 5 1/2 in)	Park Ridge, Illinois
Valle	María Catalina Robayo Vargas	21	174 cm (5 ft 8 1/2 in)	Cali

== Judges ==
The following celebrities judged the final competition:

- Ana Raquel Chanis Vannucchi - Panama
- Daniel D. Phelan - United States
- Jorge Alberto Arguindegui - Argentina
- Omar Modesto Pasalodos - Cuba
- Paola Dominguín - Spain
