= Miss Uzbekistan =

Uzbekistan national beauty pageant

Miss Uzbekistan Organization; O‘zbekiston go‘zali
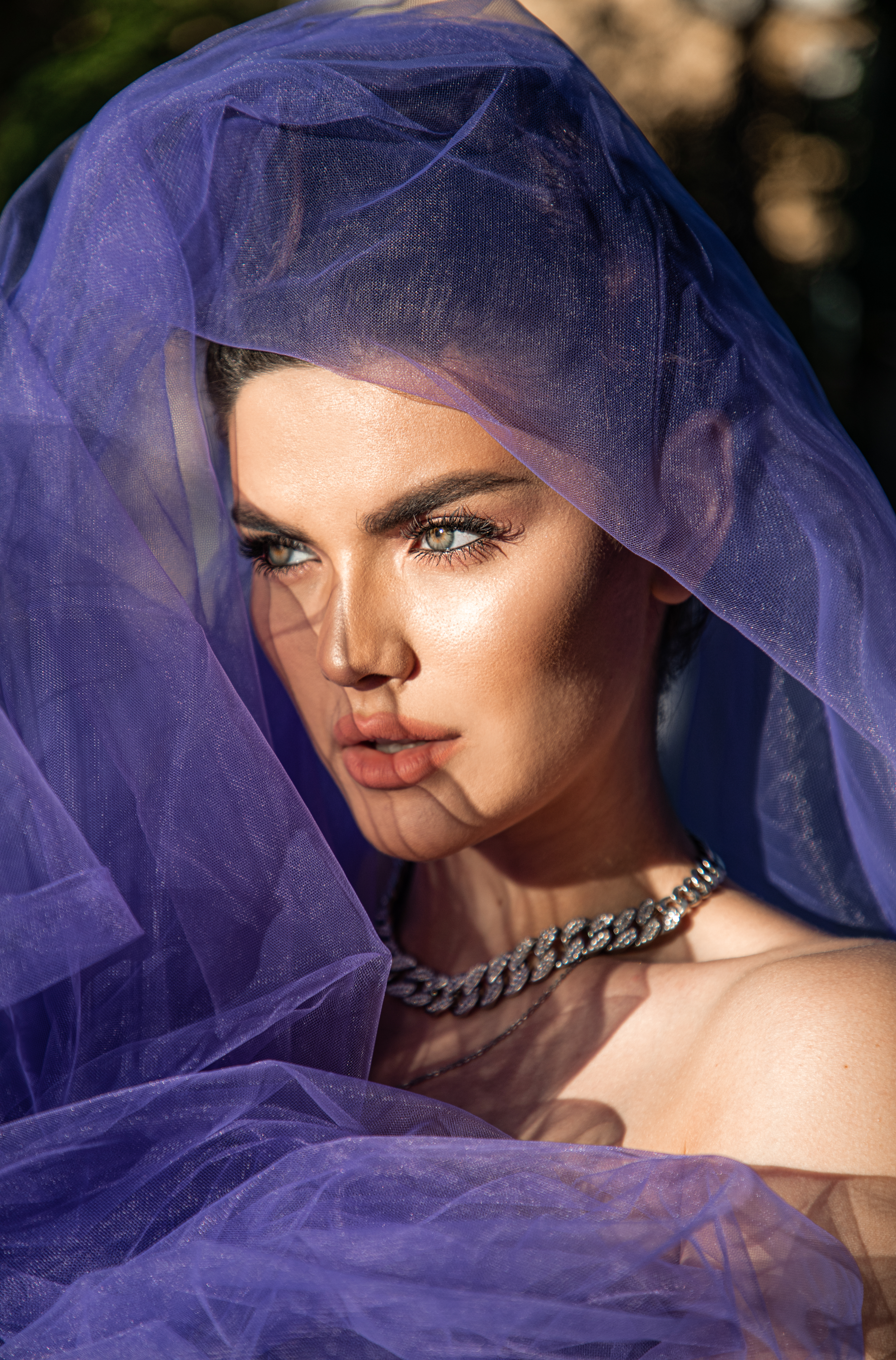
- Nigina Fakhriddinova, 2024 winner
- Formation: 2022; 4 years ago
- Purpose: Beauty pageant
- Headquarters: Tashkent
- Official language: Uzbek
- National Director: Edgar Saakyan
- Affiliations: Miss Universe
- Website: missuniverseuzbekistan.com

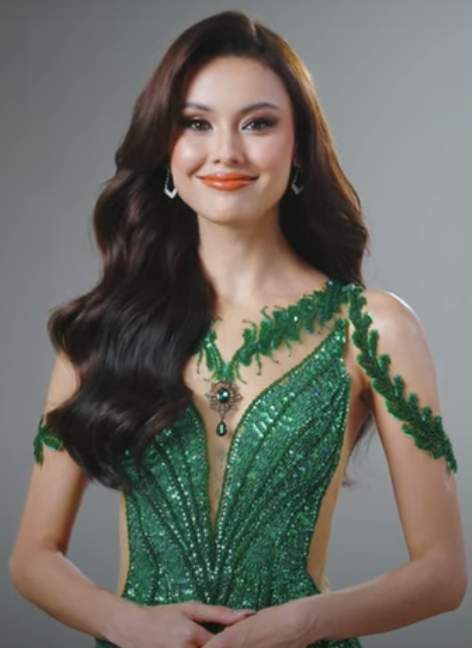
Amaliya Shakirova, Miss Grand Uzbekistan 2023

Miss Uzbekistan or O‘zbekiston go‘zali is a national beauty pageant in Uzbekistan.

The current titleholder is Ziedakhon Sharipova of Samarkand, who was appointed on November 8 2026.

== History ==
In 2013, Rakhima Ganieva was the first Miss World contestant to represent Uzbekistan. Her presence there was controversial. She began taking part in Miss World 2013 for Uzbekistan. She claimed the Miss Uzbekistan 2013 pageant was held on 20 July 2013 in Tashkent. Officials at the Uzbek Culture and Sports Ministry and the National Committee on Women were unaware that the country had held a contest.

Later in 2022, ZO'R TV presented the O‘zbekiston go‘zali or Miss Uzbekistan, which aimed to be the 1st edition of Miss Uzbekistan by using the Uzbek name. Alimboyeva Durdona won the title during the telecast.

In 2024, Edgar Saakyan was involved in organizing Miss Universe Uzbekistan and Nigina Fakhriddinova was later elected as the first Uzbek representative to compete at the said contest.

== Titleholders ==
=== Miss Uzbekistan editions ===
The winner of Miss Uzbekistan does not represent Uzbekistan at international beauty pageants.

Year	Winner	Runner-up	Contestants	Organizers
2022	Alimboyeva Durdona	No data available		Zo'r TV

=== Miss Universe Uzbekistan ===
The winner of Miss Universe Uzbekistan represents her country at Miss Universe. On occasion, when the winner does not qualify (due to age) a runner-up is sent.

Year	Winner	Runner-up	Contestants	Date	Venue
2024	Nigina Fakhriddinova	Darya Masalskaya	5	August 22 2024	Renaissance Banquet hall, Tashkent
Did not compete in 2025
2026	Ziedakhon Sharipova	N/A	1	November 8 2026	Appointed

== International competition ==
=== Miss Universe Uzbekistan ===
- : Declared the winner
- : Finished as a runner-up or top 5/6 qualification
- : Finished as one of the finalists or semifinalists
- : Finished as a special awards winner

Year	Division	Miss Uzbekistan	Placement at Miss Universe	Special Award(s)	Notes
Edgar Saakyan directorship — a franchise holder to Miss Universe from 2024
2026	Samarkand City	Ziedakhon Sharipova	TBA	TBA	Appointed
Did not compete in 2025
2024	Tashkent City	Nigina Fakhriddinova	Unplaced		

=== Miss World Uzbekistan ===
- : Declared the winner
- : Finished as a runner-up or top 5/6 qualification
- : Finished as one of the finalists or semifinalists
- : Finished as a special awards winner

Year	Division	Miss World Uzbekistan	Placement at Miss World	Special Award(s)	Notes
2013	Tashkent City	Rakhima Ganieva	Unplaced		Appointed

=== Miss International Uzbekistan ===
- : Declared the winner
- : Finished as a runner-up or top 5/6 qualification
- : Finished as one of the finalists or semifinalists
- : Finished as a special awards winner

Year	Division	Miss Uzbekistan International	Placement at Miss International	Special Award(s)	Notes
2022	Tashkent City	Nigina Fakhriddinova	Unplaced	Best National Costume	Appointed

=== Miss Earth Uzbekistan ===
- : Declared the winner
- : Finished as a runner-up or top 5/6 qualification
- : Finished as one of the finalists or semifinalists
- : Finished as a special awards winner

Year	Division	Miss Earth Uzbekistan	Placement at Miss Earth	Special Award(s)	Notes
2026	Tashkent City	Dilnoza Parpieva			Appointed
2025	Fergana City	Shakhrizoda Madaminova	Unplaced		Appointed

=== Miss Grand Uzbekistan ===
- : Declared the winner
- : Finished as a runner-up or top 5/6 qualification
- : Finished as one of the finalists or semifinalists
- : Finished as a special awards winner

Year	Division	Miss Grand Uzbekistan	Placement at Miss Grand International	Special Award(s)	Notes
2023	Tashkent City	Amaliya Shakirova	Top 20		Appointed
