= Jamielee Randall =

Gibraltarian beauty pageant contestant

- Born: 1991 or 1992 (age 33–34)
- Beauty pageant titleholder
- Title: 2013 Miss Gibraltar First Runner Up
- Major competition: Miss International 2013

Jamielee Randall (born 1991 or 1992) is a Gibraltarian beauty pageant contestant who placed as first runner up at Miss Gibraltar 2013. Randall represented Gibraltar at Miss International 2013 in Okinawa, Japan, where she became the first contestant from Gibraltar to place in the Top 15 in the pageant's history.
