= Ikumi Yoshimatsu =

Japanese actress, stunt woman, author, activist and beauty queen

Ikumi Yoshimatsu 吉松 育美
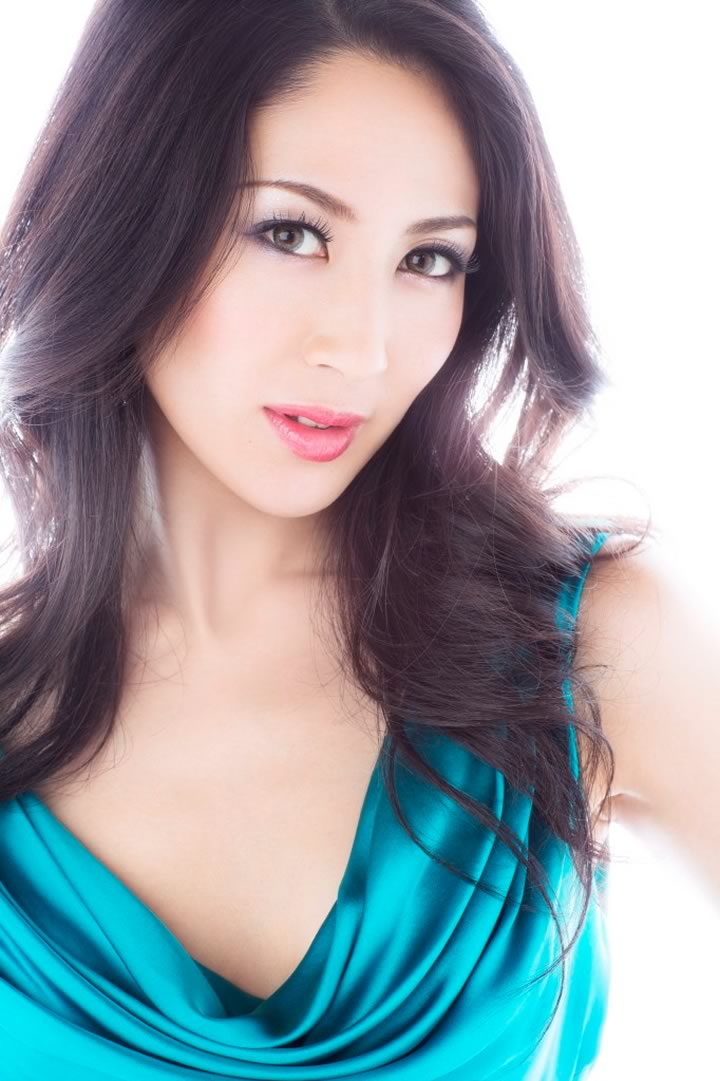
- Born: 21 June 1987 (age 39); Saga, Japan
- Occupation: Actor
- Height: 1.72 m (5 ft 8 in)
- Beauty pageant titleholder
- Title: Miss International Japan 2012; Miss International 2012
- Hair color: Black
- Eye color: Brown
- Major competitions: Miss International Japan 2012; (Winner); Miss International 2012; (Winner)

Ikumi Yoshimatsu (吉松 育美, Yoshimatsu Ikumi; born 21 June 1987) is a Japanese actress, stunt woman, book author, opinion leader, social activist and beauty queen who was crowned Miss International 2012 in Okinawa. It was Japan's first Miss International win in the 52-year history of the pageant.

In 2014, she was intimidated and criticized by Japanese nationalist and right-wing groups for publicly advocating on behalf of the historical comfort women issues and has been an outspoken leader for women's rights issues.

Yoshimatsu started the "STALKER-ZERO" campaign to introduce strict new laws to protect victims of stalking and intimidation in Japan, after becoming the first high-profile woman to go public with her personal experience in an international press conference. She was a featured presenter at Ted Talks where she advocated for stronger laws to protect women in Japan.

Ikumi started the Global Student Diplomacy Network in 2015 to connect elementary and middle school classrooms from various countries with each other by Skype for cultural exchange. The first exchange featured special guest Peter Yarrow of Peter, Paul and Mary and the governor of Saga Prefecture, Yasushi Furukawa."

She obtained a degree in education and international education at the University of the Sacred Heart in Tokyo, Japan.

Ikumi is both an actress and stunt double for Tao Okamoto in three episodes of the HBO series Westworld. She is also acting in Michael Bay's Netflix movie 6 Underground. Ikumi has been cast to star in, and is currently filming the 10 episode of, international action thriller series, LightStinger. Ikumi starred as the lead actress in Nico Santucci's movie Sarogeto, starring alongside Winsor Harmon and Eric Roberts.

Awards and achievements
Preceded by (Ecuador) Fernanda Cornejo	Miss International; 2012	Succeeded by (Philippines) Bea Santiago
Preceded by Nagomi Murayama	Miss International Japan; 2012	Succeeded by Yukiko Takahashi
