= Tomasz Gudzowaty =

Polish photographer (born 1971)

- Born: September 19, 1971 (age 54); Warsaw, Poland
- Occupation: Photography
- Title: Full Professor in Arts

Tomasz Gudzowaty (born 1971) is a Polish documentary filmmaker, portrait and art photographer, who gained international recognition through numerous publications and awards, most notably – in World Press Photo in which he succeeded nine times. He is also a multiple winner or finalist of such competitions as: Pictures of the Year International, NPPA's Best of Photojournalism, International Photography Awards, B&W Spider Awards, and National Portrait Gallery's Taylor Wessing Photographic Portrait Prize.

He traveled to over 100 countries on all continents for his photographic projects, pursuing diverse subjects, with special focus on wildlife, sport, and social issues. In recent years, portraiture has become essential in his photography. Apart from magazine publications, his works appeared in several books, and were presented at individual exhibitions at museums and galleries worldwide. According to one survey, Tomasz Gudzowaty is the best known name in contemporary Polish photography.

In recognition of his achievements, Gudzowaty received high honors from the state and national organizations in Poland, including the Knight's Cross of the Order of Polonia Restituta, awarded by the President of Poland in 2000, the Award in Visual Arts from the Polish Society of Authors and Composers ZAIKS in 2012, and the Gold Olympic Laurel in Photography from the Polish Olympic Committee in 2013. He is the son of businessman and philanthropist Aleksander Gudzowaty. He is married to Melody Gudzowaty, who excelled in many beauty pageants – Miss Islas Baleares 2008 (winner), Reina Hispanoamericana 2009 (second runner up), Miss Dominican Republic International 2012 (winner), Miss International 2012 (third runner up) – and currently is working with him on a major art project named "Planets Alive".

== Early life ==
Gudzowaty was born on September 19, 1971, in Warsaw, Poland. According to his statements in several interviews, he got interested in photography from early childhood owing to his maternal uncle, a serious amateur photographer and self-appointed chronicler of his home town. Despite that, Gudzowaty initially wanted to become a lawyer, earning a master's degree from the Faculty of Law and Administration of the University of Warsaw. Soon after, however, he returned to his true vocation, switching to photography full-time.

== Career ==
In the 1990s Gudzowaty won several awards at the Polish Press Photography Contest (Krajowy Konkurs Fotografii Prasowej), and traveled extensively in Africa and Asia. His international breakthrough came in 1999 when he was awarded the First Prize in Nature-singles category in the World Press Photo competition for a picture of young cheetahs just before killing their first prey. The photograph, titled First lesson of killing, has become iconic and eventually found their way even to schoolbooks and postal stamps. Gudzowaty confirmed his position in nature photography by winning another two prizes in the same World Press Photo category in 2000. At that time he was among very few photographers from Eastern Europe to win this highly prized competition. His black and white images of African wildlife were widely published in the Polish and international press, such as Max magazine (German edition), and the prestigious Cartier Art magazine. They were also shown in Nikon Photo Gallery in Zurich, Switzerland, and in a traveling exhibition to Polish cities. Later, after a few years break, he returned to nature photography in 2008 with a project on the Antarctic emperor penguins, titled "The Colony".

Gudzowaty was accredited as a photojournalist at the Summer Paralympic Games in 2000 in Sydney and in 2004 in Athens. In 2003 he was again among the winners at the World Press Photo with a photo story about Gongfu monks of Shaolin Temple in China, which marked his switch to sport photography for the next decade. Most of his further achievements in press photography exhibitions (World Press Photo, Pictures of the Year, Best of Photojournalism, Polish Grand Press Photo) were in sport-related categories. He focused on ethnic and other non-mainstream sports, continually developing a long term project under the name "Sports Features", later changed to "Beyond the Body". The project resulted in various magazine publications (among others: L’Equipe, Newsweek, Forbes, Time, Photo, GQ, The Guardian, National Geographic Traveler, British Journal of Photography, Red Bull magazine), and also in exhibitions shown in galleries around the world, such as Maison de Photographie in Lille, France, Bulger Gallery in Toronto, Canada, Kontrast Gallery in Stockholm, Sweden, Ethnographic Museum in Budapest, Hungary, Gallery Speak For in Tokyo, Japan, to name a few.

During that period, he also undertook several photojournalism projects documenting social and environmental issues, the most known of them being a photo story on workers in the ship-breaking yards in Chittagong, Bangladesh. The pictures from that series, completed in the years 2004–2005, were presented and published in different contexts, e.g. in the catalogue for exhibition “Ingenuity – Photography and Engineering 1845–2005” held by Calouste Gulbenkian Foundation in Lisbon and Bruxelles, an exhibition during the Festival de la Mer in Vannes, France, and four images have been quoted by Pierre Borhan in his book The Sea: An Anthology of Maritime Photography since 1843. There was also an album Shipwreckers, awarded at the Pictures of the Year for the best book publication in 2005. In 2012, Hatje Cantz published a book containing completely re-edited material under the title Keiko. That edition was recognized by the German Book Foundation as one of the most beautiful German books of the year 2013. Among his books published by Steidl, Closer received positive reviews in New Yorker and The New York Times.

In 2009 Gudzowaty's photographs were shown at Rencontres d'Arles festival as part of the joint exhibition "Ça me touche" curated by Nan Goldin.

Gudzowaty's next projects confirmed his reputation in sport photography, which has evolved from his photojournalism roots towards a creative, artistic expression. In this style, he covered such projects as retired Olympic champions, Mexican free wrestling (lucha libre) and illegal car races in Mexico, parkour, urban golf in Mumbai slums, pole dancing in Sydney, naghol ritual in Vanuatu, etc. Known mainly for his black and white nature and sport photos, he is also an accomplished art and fashion photographer. His latest project of that kind, named "Planets Alive" and featuring a Dominican-Spanish model Melody Mir Jimenez, was announced to public in 2014.

Tomasz Gudzowaty is a member of several professional organizations, such as the International Sports Press Association (AIPS), and the Union of Polish Art Photographers (ZPAF).

In 2018, he was awarded a Doctor of Arts in Film, Photography & Media from Krzysztof Kieślowski Film School of University of Silesia in Katowice, Poland. In February 2025, he was appointed full professor in the field of art.

== Style ==
Gudzowaty's style was described as very individual and highly elaborated aesthetically, prompting questions about the limits of classic photography and the new creative possibilities of the medium. Most of his projects have been done in black and white, in the form of photo essays consisting usually of twelve images. As a sport photographer, he couples his interest in the metaphysics of sport with social awareness. Among the artists who influenced him most, he frequently names Sebastião Salgado.

In 2007 Gudzowaty started to use a large format camera (Linhof Master Technika) for his projects, almost completely abandoning 35mm SLR. The change had a direct impact on his style, favoring even more elaborated composition and playing with a shallow depth of focus. He has also tended to include more portraits in his subsequent projects. Portraiture has become a strong strand in his art, a fact that has been reflected in his newer achievements in such competitions as The Taylor Wessing Photographic Portrait Prize awarded by the National Gallery London, or Spider Black And White Photo Awards.

== Books ==
- 'Following wild trails'. Warszawa : Yours Photography, 2004. ISBN 978-8-3894-3815-7
- 'Of eagle and man'. Warszawa : Yours Photography. ISBN 978-8-3894-3820-1
- 'Paradise crossing', Warszawa : Yours Photography, 2004. ISBN 978-8-38943-825-6
- 'Wide wild world', Warszawa : Yours Photography, 2004. ISBN 978-83-89438-10-2
- 'Shipwreckers', Warszawa : Yours Photography, 2005
- 'Keiko', Ostfildern : Hatje Cantz, 2012. ISBN 978-3-7757-3521-6
- 'Beyond The Body. Tomasz Gudzowaty in the eyes of Nan Goldin'. Göttingen : Steidl Verlag 2015. ISBN 978-3-95829-040-2
- 'Closer'. Göttingen : Steidl Verlag 2016. ISBN 978-3-95829-044-0
- 'Proof'. Göttingen : Steidl Verlag 2016. ISBN 978-3-95829-164-5
- 'Photography as a New Kind of Love Poem'. Göttingen : Steidl Verlag 2016. ISBN 978-3-95829-041-9
- 'Sumo. Are-Bure-Bokeh'. Berlin : Hatje Cantz 2022. ISBN 978-3-77575-195-7

== Awards ==
2014

- Black & White Spider Awards – Photographer of the Year, US
- Black & White Spider Awards – 1st place – Outstanding Achievement, People category, US
- Black & White Spider Awards – Honorable Mention, People category, US
- Black & White Spider Awards – 1st place – Outstanding Achievement, Sport category, US
- Black & White Spider Awards – 2nd place, Sport category, US
- Black & White Spider Awards – 1st place – Outstanding Achievement, Photojournalism category, US
- Black & White Spider Awards – Honorable Mention, Photojournalism category, US
- Black & White Spider Awards – two Honorable Mentions, Portrait, USA IPA – 3rd place, Editorial: Sports, US
- IPA – Honorable Mention, Deeper Perspective, US
- IPA – two Honorable Mentions, Photo Essay and Feature Story, US
- IPA – two Honorable Mentions, Sports, US
- IPA – two Honorable Mentions, Children, US
- IPA – two Honorable Mentions, Portrait, US
- IPA – Honorable Mention, Culture, US
- IPA – Honorable Mention, Family, US
- Pictures of the Year International – Third prize, Recreational Sports, US
- NPPA Best of Photojournalism −1st Place, Portrait series, US
- Grand Press Photo 2014 – Second prize, Sports – stories category, Poland
- Grand Press Photo 2014 – Second prize, Environment – stories category, Poland

2013

- Black & White Spider Awards – Honorable Mention, Photojournalism category, US
- Black & White Spider Awards – two Honorable Mentions, Sport category, US
- Black & White Spider Awards – 3rd Place – Honor of Distinction, Wildlife category, US
- IPA – Honorable Mention, Sports, US
- IPA – Honorable Mention, Portrait, US
- IPA – Honorable Mention, Family, US

2012

- Black & White Spider Awards – 1st Place – Outstanding Achievement, People category, US
- Black & White Spider Awards – Honorable Mention, Sport category, US
- NPPA Best of Photojournalism – Honorable Mention, Sports Picture Stories category, US
- Grand Press Photo 2012 – First prize, Sports – stories category, Poland
- Grand Press Photo 2012 – Second prize, Sports – stories category, Poland
- Grand Press Photo 2012 – First prize, Sports – singles category, Poland
- Grand Press Photo 2012 – Third prize, Sports – singles category, Poland
- The PGB Photo Award – First prize, Sports Feature Picture of the Year category, Sweden
- Pictures of the Year International – First prize, Recreational Sports, US
- Pictures of the Year International – Second prize, Sports Picture Story, US
- World Press Photo – Third prize, Sport – stories category, Holland

2011

- NPPA Best of Photojournalism – First prize, Sports Feature category, US
- Grand Press Photo 2011 – First prize, Sports – stories category, Poland
- Grand Press Photo 2011 – Second prize, Sports – stories category, Poland
- Pictures of the Year International – First prize, Sports Picture Story category, US
- Pictures of the Year International – Second prize, Sports Features, US
- World Press Photo – Second prize, Sport – stories category, Holland

2010

- Pictures of the Year International – Third prize, Sports Picture Story category, US
- The PGB Photo Award – First prize, Sports Picture Story of the Year category, Sweden

2009

- Grand Press Photo 2009 – First prize, Sports – stories category, Poland
- Grand Press Photo 2009 – Second prize, Sports – singles category, Poland
- NPPA Best of Photojournalism – First prize, Sport Picture Story category, US
- NPPA Best of Photojournalism – First prize, Portrait Series category, US
- NPPA Best of Photojournalism – Second prize, Portrait Series category, US
- Pictures of the Year International – First prize, General Division / Sports Action category, US
- World Press Photo – Third prize, Sport Features – singles category, Holland

2008

- Grand Press Photo 2008 – Grand Prix, Picture of the Year, Poland
- Grand Press Photo 2008 – First prize, Sports – stories category, Poland
- Grand Press Photo 2008 – First prize, Sports – singles category, Poland
- Grand Press Photo 2008 – Second prize, Sports – singles category, Poland
- NPPA Best of Photojournalism – Honorable Mention, Sport Picture Story category, US
- NPPA Best of Photojournalism – First prize, Sports Enterprise category, US
- Pictures of the Year International – First prize, General Division / Sports Portfolio category, US
- World Press Photo – Third prize, Sport Features – singles category, Holland

2007

- Pictures of the Year International – Award of Excellence, General Division / Sports Feature category, US
- Pictures of the Year International – Award of Excellence, General Division / Sports Picture Story category, US
- Grand Press Photo 2007 – Second prize, Sports – singles category, Poland
- Grand Press Photo 2007 – Second prize, Sports – stories category, Poland

2006

- The Humanity Photo Awards – Documentary Prize, Education, Recreation, Sports & Technology category, China
- The Humanity Photo Awards – Documentary Prize, Daily Life category, China
- NPPA Best of Photojournalism – Honorable Mention, Best Published Picture Story category, US
- NPPA Best of Photojournalism – Honorable Mention, Sport Picture Story category, US
- Grand Press Photo 2006 – Third prize, Daily Life category, Poland
- World Press Photo – Third prize, Sport Feature – stories category, Holland

2005

- Pictures of the Year International – Award of Excellence, Magazine Division / Feature Picture Story category, US

2003

- World Press Photo – First prize, Sport – singles category, Holland
- World Press Photo – Second prize, Sport – stories category, Holland
- Polish Press Photography competition (KPFP) – III prize, The World We Live In category, Poland

2001

- Polish Press Photography competition (KPFP) – II prize, kategoria: Sport – singles category, Poland
- Polish Press Photography competition (KPFP) – II prize, kategoria: Sport – stories, Poland

2000

- World Press Photo – Second prize, Nature and Environment – singles category, Holland
- Polish Press Photography competition (KPFP) – I prize, The World We Live In category, Poland
- Polish Press Photography competition (KPFP) – II prize, The World We Live In category, Poland
- Polish Press Photography competition (KPFP) – III prize, The World We Live In category, Poland

1999

- World Press Photo – First prize, Nature and Environment – singles category, Holland
- Polish Press Photography competition (KPFP) – II prize, The World We Live In category, Poland

== Personal life ==
On August 23, 2014, Gudzowaty married Melody Mir Jimenez, a Dominican-Spanish photo model and beauty pageant queen. The couple has two daughters: Audrey, born July 23, 2015, and Alaia Bella, born October 25, 2016.

== Varia ==
- Gudzowaty's photography was cited in a novel Le Port-Plume de Corbu by French author Daniel Braud.
- A story of his friendship with his real-life pet dog named Najki inspired a novel by Margaret Mahy "Tale of a Tail".
