= Nigina Fakhriddinova =

Uzbekistani model

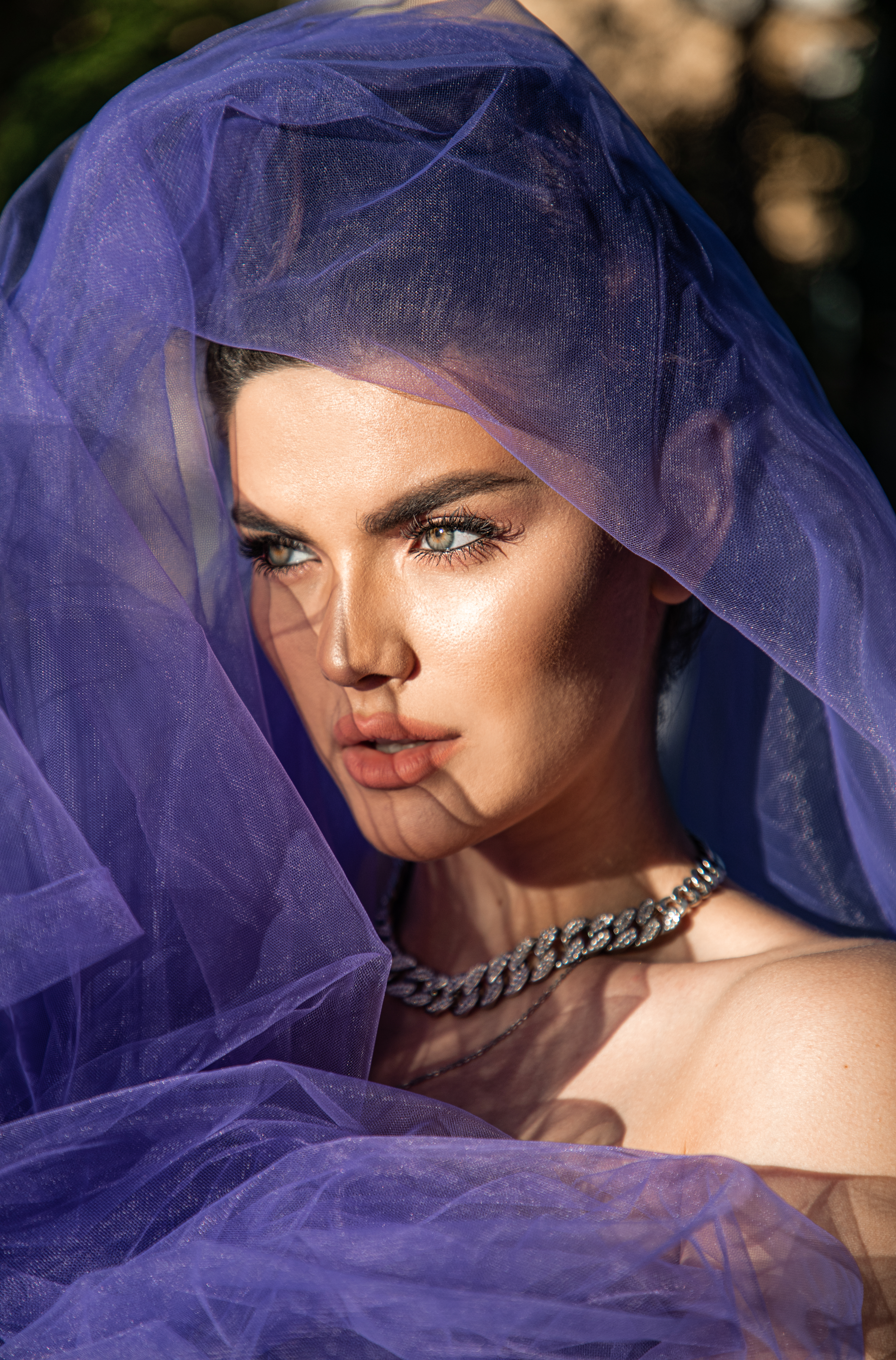
- Fakhriddinova in 2021
- Born: 15 June 1999 (age 27); Navoiy, Uzbekistan
- Occupations: Actress; model; television personality
- Height: 1.78 m (5 ft 10 in)
- Beauty pageant titleholder
- Title: Miss Universe Uzbekistan 2024; Miss Uzbekistan 2019, 2022; Fashion Model CIS (Central Asian Countries) 2018; Top Model Friendship 2018; Miss Intercontinental Uzbekistan 2019; Miss International Uzbekistan 2020, 2021
- Hair color: Dark brown
- Eye color: Green
- Major competitions: Miss International 2022 (Unplaced); (Best National Costume); Miss Uzbekistan 2019 (Winner); Miss Universe Uzbekistan 2024 (Winner); Miss Universe 2024 (Unplaced)

Nigina Timurovna Fakhriddinova (Uzbek: Nigina Timurovna Faxriddinova, Russian: Нигина Тимуровна Фахриддинова, born 15 June 1999) is an Uzbekistani actress, television personality and beauty pageant titleholder who was appointed as the first Miss Universe Uzbekistan 2024 and represented her country at Miss Universe 2024.

== Early life ==
Nigina Fakhriddinova was born in Navoiy, Uzbekistan.

In 2015, she graduated from School No. 8 in Navoiy, Uzbekistan. Then she studied at college, has a specialized secondary education in computer engineering. After secondary graduation she started her modeling career in Tashkent.

== Pageantry ==
In 2018, she participated in the contest Top model of the CIS (Commonwealth of Independent States) 2018, winning fashion model 2018 and top model friendship.

In 2019, she participated in the Miss Intercontinental contest, as Uzbekistan's first representative.

In 2019 she also participated in Fashion Week in Tajikistan.

Fakhriddinova represented Uzbekistan for the first time at Miss International 2022, which was originally scheduled for 2020, but due to the COVID-19 pandemic was postponed.

== Awards ==
Miss Intercontinental Uzbekistan 2019

Miss International Uzbekistan 2020/21

Awards and achievements
Preceded by	Miss International Uzbekistan; 2022	Succeeded by
Preceded by	Miss Universe Uzbekistan; 2024	Succeeded by Ziedakhon Sharipova
