= Miss Colombia 2012 =

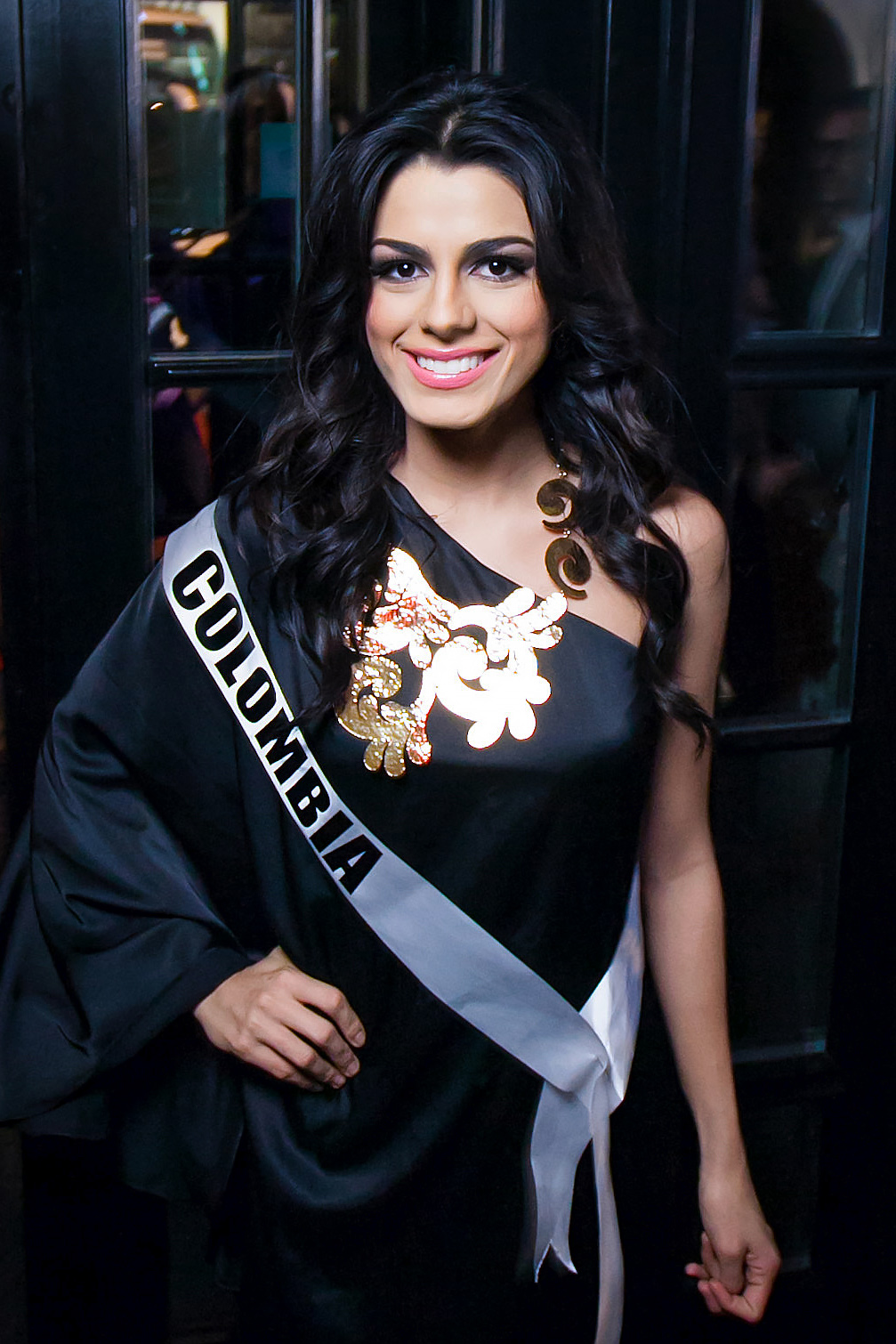
- Lucia Aldana, Miss Colombia 2012-2013, during Miss Universe 2013.
- Date: November 12, 2012
- Presenters: Andrea Serna; Carolina Cruz; Catalina Robayo
- Entertainment: Franco De Vita; Jorge Celedón; Santiago Cruz; Debi Nova.
- Venue: Auditorio Barahona, Centro de Convenciones Julio César Turbay, Cartagena de Indias
- Broadcaster: RCN TV
- Entrants: 25
- Placements: 10
- Withdrawals: Boyacá; Caldas
- Returns: Córdoba
- Winner: Lucia Aldana; Valle del Cauca
- Congeniality: Sthephanie Aldana; Cundinamarca
- Best National Costume: Yuliana Claudeth Mejía; Atlántico
- Photogenic: Laura Archbold; San Andrés, Providencia y Santa Catalina

Miss Colombia 2012 was the 60th edition of the Miss Colombia pageant. It was held on November 12, 2012 in Cartagena, Colombia.

At the end of the event, Daniella Álvarez of Atlántico crowned Lucia Aldana of Valle as Miss Colombia 2012-2013. She represented Colombia in Miss Universe 2013 but failed to place in the semifinals.

== Results ==
=== Placements ===
Color key

- The contestant was a Finalist/Runner-up in an International pageant.
- The contestant did not place.

Placement	Contestants	International placement
Miss Colombia 2012	Valle del Cauca – Lucia Aldana	Unplaced – Miss Universe 2013
1st Runner-Up	Huila – Lorena Hermída	4th Runner-up – Miss International 2013
2nd Runner-Up	Meta – Margarita Peralta	2nd Runner-Up – Miss Intercontinental 2013
3rd Runner-Up	Antioquia – Laura Trujillo	
4th Runner-Up	Atlántico – Yuliana Claudeth Mejía	Finalist in Miss Caraibes Ibiscus 2013
Top 10	Cesar – Stefany Giraldo; Guajira – Daniela Margarita Vega; Magdalena – Adriana Lucía Vidal; San Andrés, Providencia y Santa Catalina – Laura Archbold; Tolima – Karol Ximena Quintero	

=== Special awards ===
Award	Winner
Queen of the Police (Reina de la Policía)	Atlántico – Yuliana Mejía
Best Body (Figura Bodytech)	Cauca – María Alejandra Valencia
Best Face (Rostro Jolie)	San Andrés, P. and S.C. – Laura Archbold
Oster Challenge (Desafio Oster)	Norte de Santander – Marisela Arevalo; Valle del Cauca – Lucía Aldana
Miss Punctuality (Señorita Puntualidad Edox)	Tolima – Karol Quintero
Miss Elegance (Señorita Elegancia Primatela)	Cesar – Stefany Giraldo
Best Regional Costume (Mejor Traje Artesanal)	Atlántico – Yuliana Mejía
Zapatilla Real	Meta – Margarita Maria Peralta
Miss Photogenic (Señorita Fotogenica)	San Andrés, P. and S.C. – Laura Archbold
Miss Congeanilaty (Mejor Compañera)	Cundinamarca – Sthephanie Aldana

== Scores ==
Legend
Miss Colombia 2012-2013
1st Runner-up
2nd Runner-up
3rd Runner-up
4th Runner-up
Top 10

Departament	Evening Gown
Valle	9.8 (1)
Huila	9.7 (2)
Meta	9.7 (2)
Antioquia	9.4 (4)
Atlántico	9.4 (4)
Cesar	9.4 (4)
Guajira	9.4 (4)
Tolima	9.3 (8)
San Andrés	9.2 (9)
Magdalena	8.9 (10)
Caquetá	8.9
Norte de Santander	8.7
Cundinamarca	8.6
Cartagena	8.5
Chocó	8.5
Santander	8.5
Cauca	8.4
Bogotá	8.3
Quindío	8.3
Bolívar	8.1
Risaralda	8.1
Sucre	8.1
Arauca	7.9
Córdoba	7.9
Nariño	7.9

== Delegates ==
25 delegates have been selected to compete.

Department / District	Name	Age	Height	Hometown
Antioquia	Laura Trujillo Montoya	23	174 cm (5 ft 8 1/2 in)	Medellín
Arauca	Natalia Vanessa Fonseca Tavera	21	169 cm (5 ft 6 1/2 in)	Arauca
Atlántico	Yuliana Claudeth Mejía Restrepo	22	173 cm (5 ft 8 in)	Barranquilla
Bogotá D.C.	Loly Cecilia Fuentes Ballestas	22	173 cm (5 ft 8 in)	Barranquilla
Bolívar	Karen Margarita Mendoza Olivares	22	177 cm (5 ft 9 1/2 in)	Cartagena de Indias
Caquetá	Yeny Andrea González Figueroa	23	172 cm (5 ft 7 1/2 in)	Neiva
Cartagena, D.T. and C.	Elida Patricia Castro Herrera	23	174 cm (5 ft 8 1/2 in)	Cartagena de Indias
Cauca	María Alejandra Valencia Guerra	22	169 cm (5 ft 6 1/2 in)	Popayán
Cesar	Stefany Giraldo Pino	22	170 cm (5 ft 7 in)	Gamarra
Chocó	Edy Yohana Asprilla Leudo	23	169 cm (5 ft 6 1/2 in)	Nóvita
Córdoba	Lizeth Paola Cueter López	22	167 cm (5 ft 5 1/2 in)	Ciénaga de Oro
Cundinamarca	Sthephanie Aldana Vanegas	22	176 cm (5 ft 9 1/2 in)	Bogotá
Guajira	Daniela Margarita Vega Mendoza	19	171 cm (5 ft 7 1/2 in)	Barranquilla
Huila	Cindy Lorena Hermída Aguilar	23	176 cm (5 ft 9 1/2 in)	Pitalito
Magdalena	Adriana Lucía Vidal España	23	174 cm (5 ft 8 1/2 in)	Santa Marta
Meta	Margarita María Peralta Tovar	18	171 cm (5 ft 7 1/2 in)	Restrepo
Nariño	Daniela Castillo Caicedo	24	170 cm (5 ft 7 in)	Pasto
Norte de Santander	Marisela Arévalo Arévalo	24	176 cm (5 ft 9 1/2 in)	Teorama
Quindío	Ana María Ospina Saiz	21	168 cm (5 ft 6 in)	Bogotá
Risaralda	Laura María Alzate Ocampo	19	171 cm (5 ft 7 1/2 in)	Pereira
San Andrés, P. and S.C.	Laura Valentina Archbold Rodríguez	22	168 cm (5 ft 6 in)	San Andrés
Santander	Paola Andrea Trujillo Ramírez	21	170 cm (5 ft 7 in)	Bucaramanga
Sucre	Andrea Peñuela Mogoñón	21	176 cm (5 ft 9 1/2 in)	Corozal
Tolima	Karol Ximena Quintero Sánchez	20	169 cm (5 ft 6 1/2 in)	Mariquita
Valle	Carmen Lucia Aldana Roldán	20	1,71 cm (5 ft 5 in)	Cali
