= Melody Gudzowaty =

Dominican Republic model (born 1989)

- Born: Melodía Mir Jiménez; 1 October 1989 (age 36); Santo Domingo, Dominican Republic
- Other name: Melody Mir
- Occupations: pageant contestant, model
- Spouse: Tomasz Gudzowaty (m. 2014)
- Modeling information
- Hair color: brown
- Eye color: brown
- Website: www.melodymir.com

Melodía 'Melody' Mir Jiménez (born 1 October 1989), known as Melody Gudzowaty, is a Dominican model and winner of several national and international beauty pageants. She also holds Spanish citizenship. On 23 August 2014, she married Polish photographer Tomasz Gudzowaty, with whom she has been working on different photo projects since 2011.

She studied Tourism Management in Palma de Mallorca. Apart from her native Spanish she is fluent in Catalan, English, French, German and Polish.

== Early life ==
Melodía Mir Jimenez was born into a dual-nationality family to a Spanish father and a Dominican mother. She lived her childhood between Spain and Dominican Republic, where she did several courses on modeling, etiquette, protocol and locution. At the age of 11, she participated in her first child beauty pageant 'Mini Modelo del año', where she became the first runner up and won the Best Talent in belly dancing.

== Beauty queen career ==
In 2008, at the age of 18, she became Miss Islas Baleares, later she participated in Miss Spain 2009, won the title of Miss Grand Oasis, a special award for the Best Look, and became a finalist. She was selected to represent Spain in the international competition Reina Hispanoamericana 2009 and won the second runner-up place (equivalent to fourth position). In July 2012 she was crowned as the Miss Dominican Republic International that gave her the opportunity to participate in the Miss International 2012 contest in Okinawa, Japan. She entered the TOP 5 and won the title of 3rd runner up (4th place). In January 2013 she participated in Reinado Internacional del Café 2013 in Manizales, Colombia, coming in as the first runner-up.

== Career in modeling ==
Melody started to model for professional photo sessions as a teenager. Her pictures appeared internationally in magazines and ads. Currently, she forms an artistic duo with her husband Tomasz Gudzowaty, working worldwide on various photo projects, most recently “Planets Alive”.

Awards and achievements
| Preceded by Xisca Rebassa | Miss Islas Baleares; 2008 | Succeeded by Verónica Hernández Rodríguez |
| Preceded by Catherine Ramírez Rosario | Miss Dominican Republic International; 2012 | Succeeded by Carmen Muñoz Guzmán |
