= Lucia Aldana =

Colombian model

Lucía Aldana
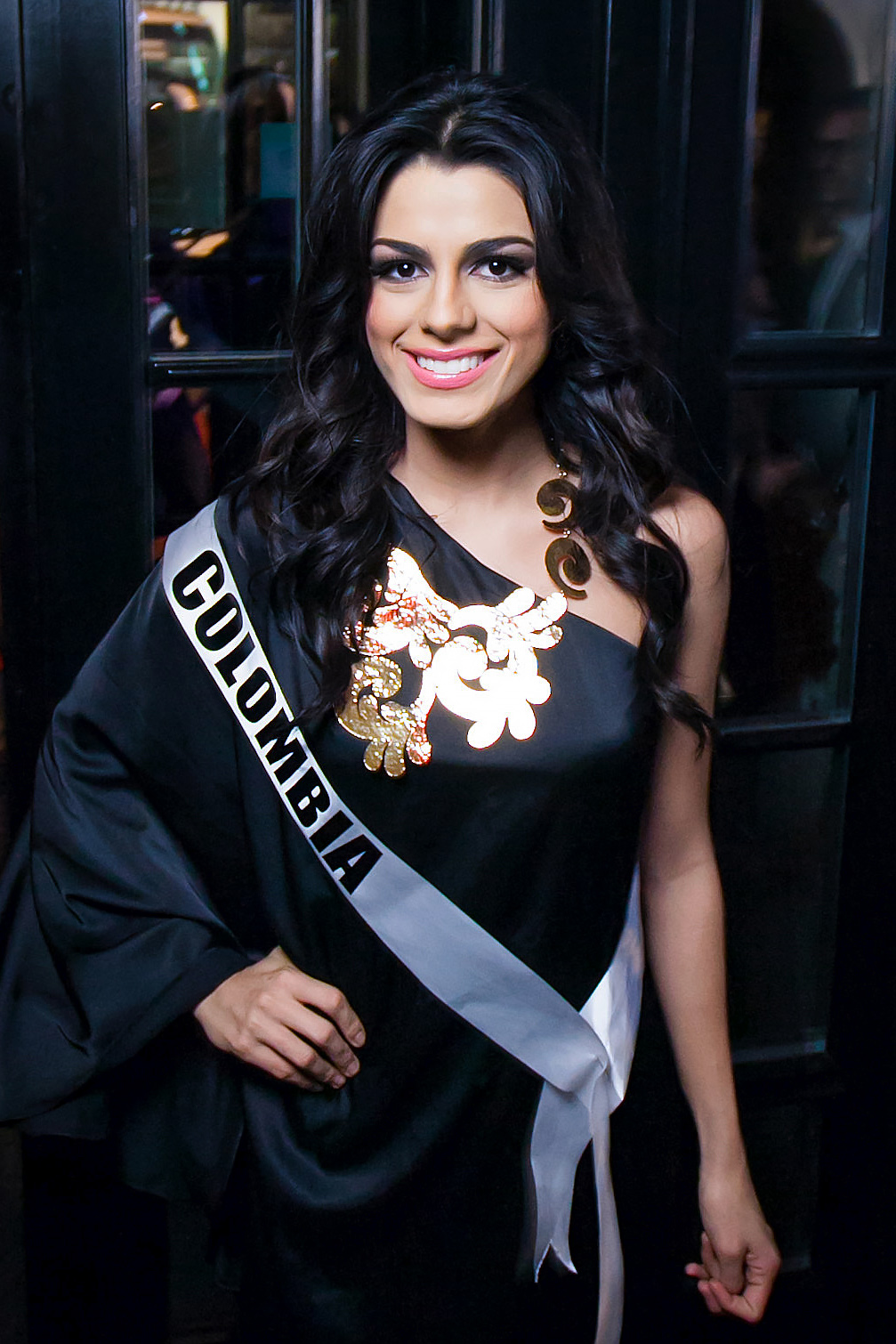
- Born: Carmen Lucía Aldana Roldán; March 9, 1992 (age 34); Cali, Cauca Valley, Colombia
- Other name: Lucía Aldana
- Height: 1.71 m (5 ft 7 in)
- Beauty pageant titleholder
- Title: Miss Valle 2012; Miss Colombia 2012
- Hair color: Black
- Eye color: Black
- Major competitions: Miss Colombia 2012 (Winner); Miss Universe 2013 (Unplaced)

Carmen Lucía Aldana Roldán (born March 9, 1992, in Cali) is a Colombian model and beauty pageant titleholder who won the title of Miss Colombia 2012. Aldana represented Colombia in Miss Universe 2013. She was the last Colombian delegate of the Miss Universe 1st Colombian drought, as her successor as Miss Colombia, Paulina Vega, won the title as Miss Universe 2014.

== Early life ==
Aldana grew up in Samanes de Guadalupe a low middle-class neighborhood in Cali, Valle del Cauca, Colombia, and is the daughter of Maria Consuelo Roldan de Aldana (a housewife) and Hector Aldana (a lawyer) she is the youngest of five children. Aldana graduated from public school Instituto Tecnico Industrial. She was raised Catholic but since 2003 when she was 11 years she and her family became members of a Protestant church called Avivando La Fe in Cali, Colombia. Aldana identifies herself as Protestant.

== Education ==
She attended Universidad Autonoma de Occidente up until she won; she was studying her last year of Journalism. One of her bigger dreams is to be the Producer and Director of a TV show.

== Miss Colombia ==
Miss Valle, Lucia Aldana was crowned Miss Colombia 2012 by Daniella Alvarez (Miss Colombia 2011) at the 78th edition of Miss Colombia beauty pageant which took place at the Convention Center Julio Cesar Turbay Ayala, in the auditorium Gethsemane, Cartagena de Indias on grand coronation night of Monday, November 12, 2012. She then competed in Miss Universe 2013 in Moscow, Russia but failed to place in the semifinals.

Awards and achievements
Preceded by Daniella Álvarez	Miss Colombia; 2012	Succeeded by Paulina Vega
Preceded by Melina Ramírez	Miss Valle; 2012	Succeeded by Tania Valencia Cuero
