= Annabella Fleck =

German model and beauty queen

- Born: 29 December; Munich, Germany
- Occupations: International model; Beauty queen; Actress
- Known for: Holding various beauty pageant titles
- Notable work: Miss Earth Germany
- Height: 1.76 m (5 ft 9 in)
- Beauty pageant titleholder
- Title: Miss Earth Germany 2020; Miss Europe Germany 2019; Miss International Germany 2019
- Hair color: Ash blonde
- Eye colour: Blue-green
- Major competitions: Miss Earth 2020; Miss International 2019

Annabella Fleck (born 29 December) is a German model, beauty pageant titleholder, and actress who was crowned Miss Earth Germany and represented her country in the Miss Earth 2020. She was also crowned Miss International Germany and Miss Europe Germany in 2019.

== Early life and education ==
Fleck was born on 29 December in Munich, Germany as the oldest child of three. She attended a music high school, where she developed her skills as a pianist. Additionally, she practiced ballet at the Bavarian State Opera.

== Pageantry ==
Fleck began her pageantry career by winning the title of Miss Europe Germany in 2019. She was then crowned Miss International Germany and represented Germany at the Miss International 2019 pageant held on November 12, 2019, at Tokyo Dome City Hall in Tokyo, Japan.

In 2020, she was crowned Miss Earth Germany and competed in the Miss Earth 2020 pageant, where she was placed in the top 20.

In 2022, she collaborated with Dolce & Gabbana for Milan Fashion Week. She also participated in Cannes Film Festival in the same year.

In 2023, she represented Germany as a G20 delegate at the Ladakh International Music Festival 2023, organised by the Ladakh Autonomous Hill Development Council, Leh and the Government of India

In 2024, she appeared on the cover of Harper's Bazaar Vietnam.

In May 2026, she made her fourth consecutive appearance at the Cannes Film Festival, attending the world premiere of the film Fjord.

== Advocacy ==
Fleck is an advocate for environmental change and has participated in projects addressing environmental issues, animal welfare, and children's rights.

== Awards and achievements ==
Awards and achievements
Preceded by Kristyna Losova	Miss Earth Germany; 2020	Succeeded by Maike Damrat
Preceded by Franciska Acs	Miss International Germany; 2019	Succeeded by Jasmin Selberg
