= Natalia Valenzuela =

Colombian beauty pageant titleholder (born 1989)

Natalia Valenzuela Cutiva
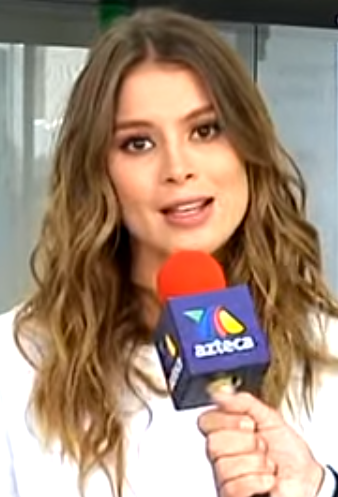
- Valenzuela in 2017
- Born: Natalia Valenzuela Cutiva; April 16, 1989 (age 37); Neiva, Huila, Colombia
- Height: 5 ft 9.5 in (1.77 m)
- Beauty pageant titleholder
- Title: Miss Huila 2010; Miss Colombia International 2010
- Hair color: Dark Blonde
- Eye color: Brown
- Major competitions: Miss Colombia 2010 (2nd runner-up); Miss International 2011 (Unplaced)

Natalia Valenzuela Cutiva (born April 16, 1989 in Neiva) is a Colombian TV host, model and beauty pageant titleholder who won the Miss Huila 2010 contest which allowed her to participate in the Miss Colombia 2010 pageant, where she won the title of Primera Princesa (2nd runner-up) and Miss Colombia International.

== Early life ==
On April 16, 1989, Valenzuela was born in Neiva, Colombia.

Her measurements are 86–61–91 (centimeters); she is 1.77 meters tall and has brown eyes, brown hair and white skin. She has studied performance arts and is part of the Casting models agency.

== Career ==
Valenzuela is a television program presenter for a Colombian private television network RCN TV for the show, Style RCN in Spanish Estilo RCN.

== Miss Colombia 2010 ==
Valenzuela represented the department of Huila in Miss Colombia 2010, held in Cartagena de Indias, on November 15, 2010. She was crowned as 1st princess after obtaining some of the highest scores: 9.7 in the evening gown competition and 9.6 in the swimsuit competition. In addition, Cutiva also won several special awards prior to the final competition for Miss Colombia: Miss National Police, Miss Bodytech Figure (Best Body) and Miss Natural Beauty.

Traditionally 1st runners-up represent Colombia at Miss International, but the maximum age to compete is 24, at the time of the event. The fact that Valenzuela would be older than 24 at the time of the event made her ineligible for that specific pageant. She was therefore delegated to represent Colombia in the 18 version of Top Model of the World and Valenzuela took her place in Miss International 2011.

== Miss International 2011 ==
On November 6, 2011, Valenzuela competed at the Miss International 2011 pageant, held in Chengdu (China), when she represented her country Colombia, but did not place.

Awards and achievements
Preceded by Leydi Gómez	Miss International Colombia; 2011	Succeeded by Melissa Varón
Preceded by Mayra Roa	Miss Huila; 2010	Succeeded by Daniela Villaveces
