= Miss International 1989 =

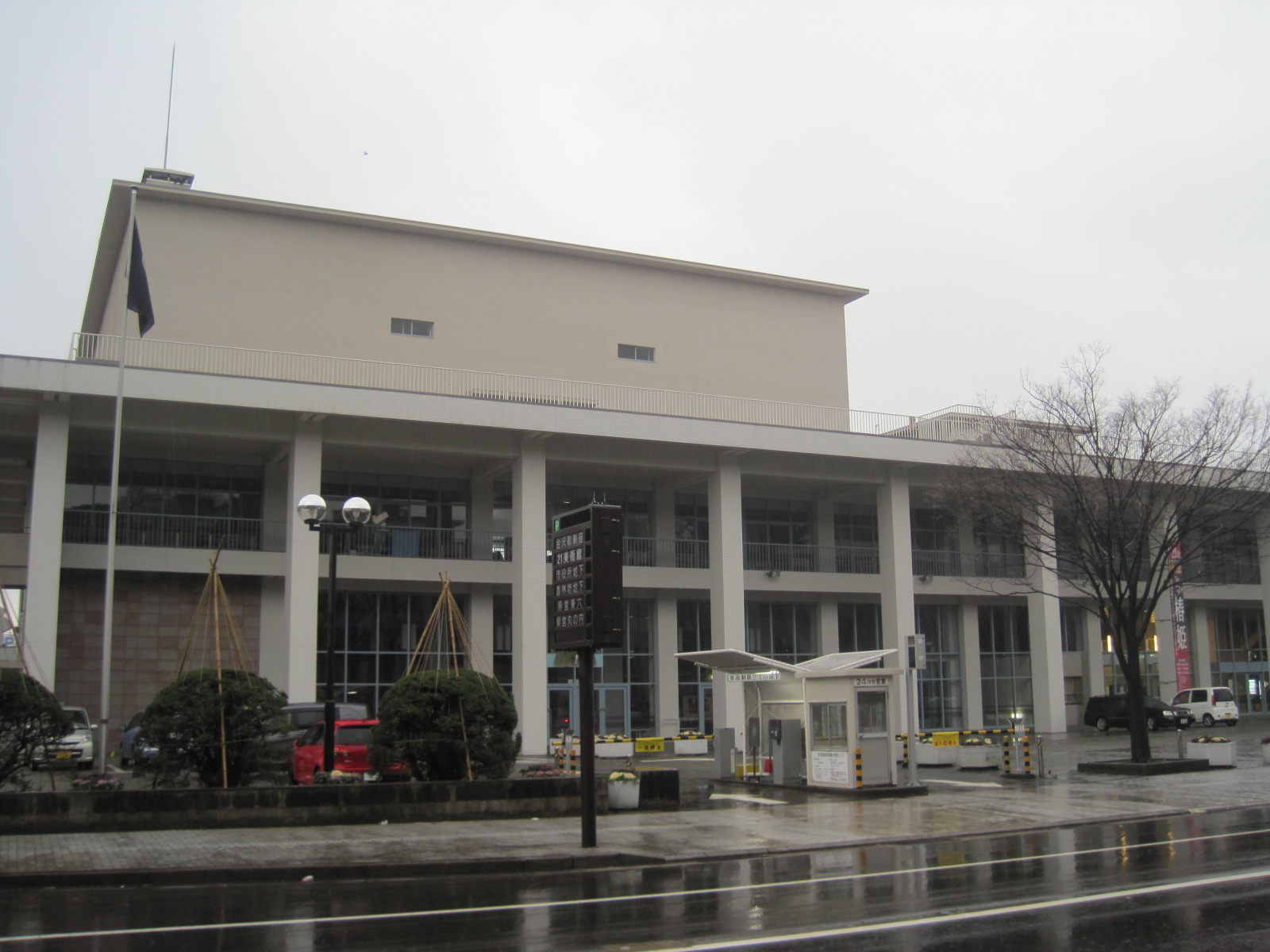
- Date: September 17, 1989
- Presenters: Masumi Okada
- Venue: Kanazawa Kagekiza, Kanazawa, Japan
- Broadcaster: TV Tokyo
- Entrants: 47
- Placements: 15
- Withdrawals: India; Peru; Uruguay; Yugoslavia
- Returns: Austria; Dominican Republic; Hawaii; Paraguay; Poland
- Winner: Iris Klein; West Germany

Miss International 1989, the 29th Miss International pageant, was held on 17 September 1989 at Kanazawa's Kagekiza. The pageant was hosted by Masumi Okada

Iris Klein of the West Germany won and was crowned by Catherine Gude of Norway at the end of the event. This marked the second victory for Germany in the pageant. The first runner-up was Aneta Kręglicka from Poland, and the second runner-up was Carolina Trujillo from Venezuela.

== Results ==
=== Placements ===
Placement	Contestant
Miss International 1989	West Germany - Iris Klein
1st runner-up	Poland - Aneta Kręglicka
2nd runner-up	Venezuela - Carolina Trujillo
Top 15	Australia - Jodie Martel; Denmark - Maria Hirse; Finland - Minna Kittilä; Great Britain - Victoria Lace; Hawaii - Sherri Teixeira; Holland - Gyslain Mydwelk; Iceland - Gudrun Eyjolfsdóttir; Mexico - Erika Escalante; New Zealand - Rochelle Boyle; South Korea - Kim Hee-jung; Spain - Mercedes Mier; United States - Deborah Lee Husti

== Contestants ==
- Argentina - Marcela Laura Bonesi
- Australia - Jodie Martel
- Austria - Bettina Berghold
- Belgium - Violetta Blazejczak
- Bolivia - Katerine Rivera Vaca
- Brazil - Ana Paula Ottani
- Canada - Linda Marie Farrell
- Colombia - Clelia Alexandra Ablanque Moreno
- Costa Rica - Maria Antonieta Sáenz Vargas
- Denmark - Maria Josephine Hirse
- Dominican Republic - Elbanira Morales de la Rosa
- Finland - Minna Kaarina Kittilä
- France - Dorothée Lambert
- Great Britain - Victoria Susannah Lace
- Greece - Emmanouela Evdoridou
- Guam - Janiece Annette Santos
- Hawaii - Sherri Joan Teixeira
- Holland - Ghislaine Niewold
- Honduras - Cynthia Zavala
- Hong Kong - Donna Chu Kit-Yee
- Iceland - Gudrun Eyjolfsdóttir
- Ireland - Louise Rose Kelley
- Israel - Limor Fishel
- Italy - Barbara Tarcci
- Jamaica - Loceilia Stephenson
- Japan - Tamae Ogura
- Luxembourg - Nicole Schalz
- Mexico - Erika Salum Escalante
- New Zealand - Rochelle Boyle
- Northern Mariana Islands - Teresa Wamar
- Norway - Heide Olsen
- Panama - Jenia Mayela Nenzen
- Paraguay - Alba Maria Cordero Rivals
- Philippines - Lilia Eloisa Marfori Andanar
- Poland - Aneta Kręglicka
- Portugal - Helena Cristina da Silva Teixeira
- Puerto Rico - Michele Cotto
- Singapore - Pamela Kurt Ha Chee
- South Korea - Kim Hee-jung
- Spain - Mercedes Martín Mier
- Sweden - Isabelle Soelmann
- Switzerland - Françoise Bezzola
- Thailand - Mayuree Chaiyo
- Turkey - Esra Acar
- United States - Deborah Lee Husti
- Venezuela - Beatriz Carolina Omaña Trujillo
- West Germany - Iris Klein
