= Catalina Robayo =

Colombian model and TV host

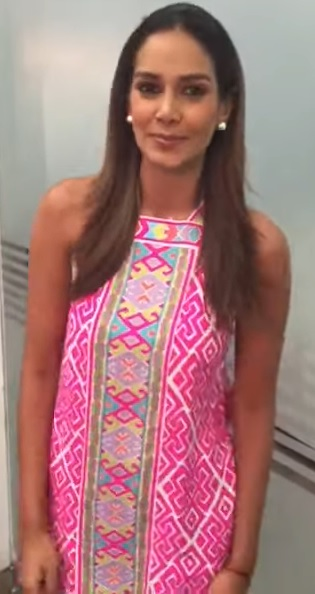
- Robayo in 2015
- Born: Catalina Robayo Vargas; May 12, 1989 (age 37); Cali, Cauca Valley, Colombia
- Education: Pontifical Xavierian University (BL)
- Occupations: Model; TV host
- Height: 5 ft 9 in (1.75 m)
- Beauty pageant titleholder
- Title: Miss Valle 2010; Miss Colombia 2010
- Hair color: Dark brown
- Eye color: Brown
- Major competitions: Miss Colombia 2010 (Winner); Miss Universe 2011 (Top 16)

Catalina Robayo Vargas (born May 12, 1989) is a Colombian model, tv host and beauty pageant titleholder who was crowned Miss Colombia 2010 and represented her country at the Miss Universe 2011 where she placed Top 16.

== Early life ==
Robayo was born on May 12, 1989 in Cali, Cauca Valley to Valentin Robayo and Katty Ruth Robayo Vargas. She studied law at the Pontifical Xavierian University.

== Pageantry ==
=== Miss Colombia 2010 ===
Robayo represented her native department Valle, in the 58th edition of Miss Colombia, held on November 15, 2010, in Cartagena, Bolivar, crowning herself as Miss Colombia 2010, being the ninth time in history in which a representative of this department is crowned as Miss Colombia.

=== Miss Universe 2011 ===
As Miss Colombia 2010, one of her responsibilities was to represent the country in Miss Universe 2011, held on September 12, 2011 in São Paulo, Brazil, where she placed in the top 16 final.

Awards and achievements
Preceded by Natalia Navarro	Miss Colombia; 2010	Succeeded by Daniella Álvarez
Preceded by Diana Salgado	Miss Valle; 2009	Succeeded by Melina Ramírez
