= Iris Klein =

German model and beauty queen

Iris Klein is a German model and beauty queen who is the second delegate from her country to win the Miss International title in 1989.

In 1986, she competed in the Miss Germany pageant, representing Schleswig-Holstein. She wound up as the first runner-up. She was sent to Kanazawa, Japan to participate in the Miss International pageant three years later, eventually becoming the second German representative to win the title, some 24 years after Ingrid Finger won it in 1965.

Awards and achievements
| Preceded by (Norway) Catherine Gude | Miss International; 1989 | Succeeded by (Spain) Silvia de Esteban |
