= Miss Earth Germany =

Beauty contest

- Formation: 2010
- Type: Beauty pageant
- Headquarters: Berlin
- Location: Germany
- Members: Miss Earth
- Official language: German
- National Director: Sina Schmid
- Key people: Miss Germany
- Website: miss-earth.de

Miss Earth Germany is a national Beauty pageant in Germany to select an official candidate for the Miss Earth pageant.

== Titleholders ==
Year	Miss Earth Germany	Represented	Site of Election	Competition Performance		Ref.
Year	Miss Earth Germany	Represented	Site of Election	Placement	Special Award(s)	Ref.
2010	Reingard Hagenmann	Berlin	Schwerin	Unplaced		
2011	Manou Vivien Volkmer	Berlin	Berlin	Unplaced		
2012	Nel-Linda Zublewitz	North Rhine-Westphalia	Bünde	Top 16		
2013	Caroline Noeding	Baden-Württemberg	Rust	Unplaced		
2014	Arta Muja	Hesse	Frankfurt	Unplaced		
2015	Melanie Sofia Bauer	Saxony-Anhalt	Halle	Unplaced		
2016	Lena Bröder	North Rhine-Westphalia	Steinfurt	Unplaced		
2017	Soraya Kohlmann	Saxony	Leipzig	Did not compete		
2018	Victoria Selivanov	Upper Bavaria	Munich	Unplaced		
2019	Kristyna Losova	Hamburg	Hamburg	Unplaced	(bronze) Resort Wear (Fire)	
2020	Annabella Fleck	Munich		Top 20	(bronze) Long Gown (Europe); (silver) Resort Wear (Europe)	
2021	Did not compete					
2023	Maike Damrat	Baden-Württemberg	Böblingen	Unplaced		
2024	Cheyenne Denise Paul	Baden-Württemberg	Mühlacker	Withdrawn		
2025	Melissa Koutsandreas	Bavaria		Unplaced		

=== Casting for Miss Earth Germany from 2002 - 2009 ===
Year	Miss Earth Germany
2002	Miriam Thiele
2003	Jolena Kwasow
2005	Rebecca Kurnikowski
2006	Fatima Funk
2007	Sinem Ramazanoglu
2008	Dayana Schult

== See also ==
- Miss Earth
- Miss Earth Austria

== Official website ==
- Miss Earth Germany
