= Miss International 2012 =

Beauty pageant

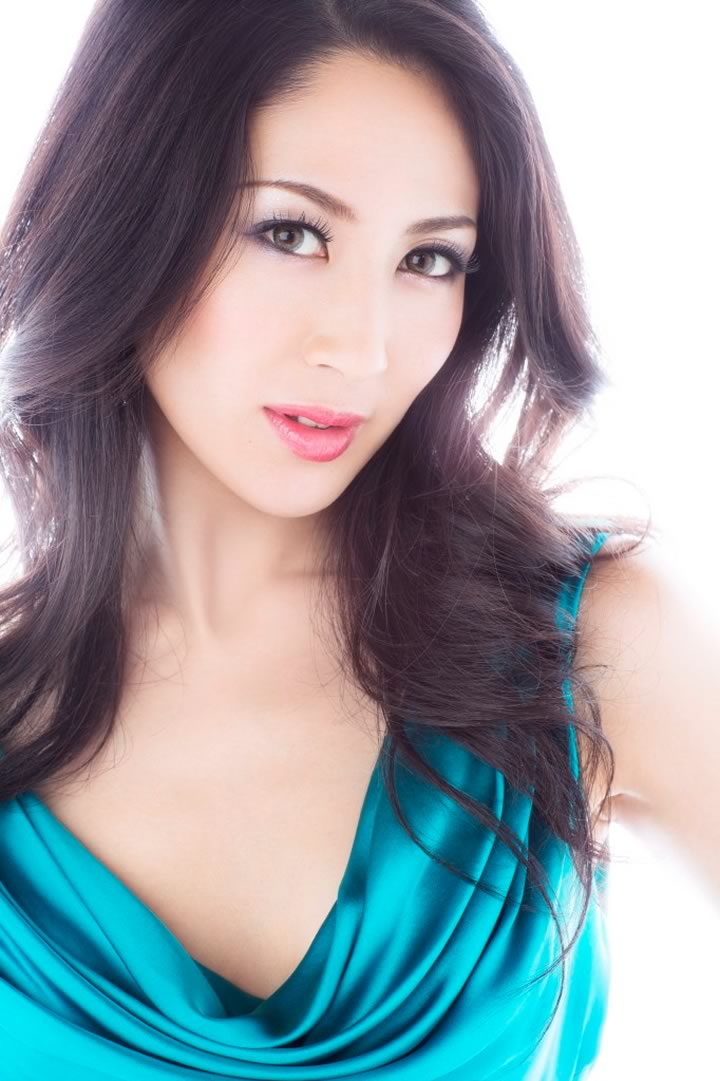
- Miss International 2012, Ikumi Yoshimatsu
- Date: October 21, 2012
- Entertainment: Ryoko Sunakawa; Toshiro Gourobe
- Venue: Okinawa Prefectural Budokan Arena Building, Naha, Okinawa, Japan
- Broadcaster: UStream (webcast)
- Entrants: 69
- Placements: 15
- Debuts: Cameroon; Gibraltar; Haiti; Namibia; United States Virgin Islands
- Withdrawals: Aruba; China; Cuba; Georgia; Hawaii; Kyrgyzstan; Netherlands; Romania; South Africa; Tanzania; Trinidad and Tobago; Vietnam; Zimbabwe
- Returns: Argentina; Canada; Gabon; Israel; Mauritius; Myanmar; Nicaragua; Sri Lanka; Suriname; United Kingdom
- Winner: Ikumi Yoshimatsu; Japan

Miss International 2012, the 52nd Miss International pageant, was held on October 21, 2012, at Okinawa Prefectural Budokan Arena Building in Okinawa, Japan. Fernanda Cornejo from Ecuador crowned her successor Ikumi Yoshimatsu from Japan at the end of the event.

Yoshimatsu was dethroned shortly before the end of her reign, but she was not replaced. She was ordered by The International Culture Association (Miss International organizer) to skip the succession ceremony and “play sick and shut up” out of fear of scandal.

== Background ==
On June 8, 2012, it was announced during a Facebook conferenced by Akemi Shimomura, the president of the International Cultural Association, that the 2012 pageant will be held in Okinawa Prefectural Budokan Arena Building, Naha, Okinawa, Japan on October 21, 2012.

== Results ==
=== Placements ===
Placement	Contestant
Miss International 2012	Japan – Ikumi Yoshimatsu
1st Runner-Up	Finland – Viivi Suominen
2nd Runner-Up	Sri Lanka – Madusha Mayadunne
3rd Runner-Up	Dominican Republic – Melody Mir
4th Runner-Up	Paraguay – Nicole Huber
Top 15	Brazil – Rafaela Butarelli; Colombia – Melissa Varón; Haiti – Anedie Azael; India – Rochelle Rao; Mexico – Jessica García Formenti; Namibia – Paulina Malulu; Philippines – Nicole Schmitz; United Kingdom – Alize Lily Mounter; United States – Amanda Renee Delgado; Venezuela – Blanca Aljibes

== Contestants ==
Country/Territory	Contestant	Age	Height	Hometown	Continental Group
Argentina	Daiana Incandela	23	1.80 m (5 ft 11 in)	Buenos Aires	Americas
Australia	Sarah Jane Fraser	21	1.70 m (5 ft 7 in)	Newcastle	Oceania
Belarus	Anastasia Pogranichnaya	20	1.75 m (5 ft 9 in)	Minsk	Europe
Belgium	Alien Decock	24	1.72 m (5 ft 7 1/2 in)	Brussels	Europe
Belize	Destinee Arnold	19	1.68 m (5 ft 6 in)	Roaring Creek	Americas
Bolivia	Stephanie Nuñez	20	1.74 m (5 ft 8 1/2 in)	Pando	Americas
Brazil	Rafaela Butarelli	23	1.78 m (5 ft 10 in)	Marília	Americas
Cameroon	Francoise Odette Ngoumou	22	1.85 m (6 ft 1 in)	Douala	Africa
Canada	Marta Jablonska	24	1.79 m (5 ft 10 1/2 in)	Hamilton	Americas
Colombia	Melissa Varón	25	1.79 m (5 ft 10 1/2 in)	Santa Marta	Americas
Costa Rica	Natasha Sibaja	21	1.68 m (5 ft 6 in)	Pérez Zeledón	Americas
Denmark	Line Christiansen	18	1.70 m (5 ft 7 in)	Aarhus	Europe
Dominican Republic	Melody Mir Jiménez	23	1.77 m (5 ft 9 1/2 in)	Santiago de los Caballeros	Americas
Ecuador	Tatiana Loor	21	1.73 m (5 ft 8 in)	Santo Domingo	Americas
El Salvador	Marlin Ramirez	21	1.70 m (5 ft 7 in)	San Salvador	Americas
Estonia	Xenia Likhacheva	23	1.71 m (5 ft 7 1/2 in)	Tallinn	Europe
Finland	Viivi Suominen	25	1.75 m (5 ft 9 in)	Turku	Europe
France	Marion Amelineau	23	1.79 m (5 ft 10 1/2 in)	Givrand	Europe
Gabon	Channa Divouvi	21	1.77 m (5 ft 9 1/2 in)	Libreville	Africa
Germany	Aline Marie	25	1.76 m (5 ft 9 1/2 in)	Munich	Europe
Gibraltar	Kerrianne Massetti	24	1.81 m (5 ft 11 1/2 in)	Gibraltar	Europe
Guadeloupe	Aude Belenus	21	1.89 m (6 ft 2 1/2 in)	Basse-Terre	Americas
Guam	Chanel Cruz Jarrett	18	1.72 m (5 ft 7 1/2 in)	Agana Heights	Oceania
Guatemala	Christa Irene García González	20	1.70 m (5 ft 7 in)	Guatemala City	Americas
Haiti	Anedie Azael	23	1.77 m (5 ft 9 1/2 in)	Port-au-Prince	Americas
Honduras	Nicole Velasquez	21	1.78 m (5 ft 10 in)	Tegucigalpa	Americas
Hong Kong	Tracy Tsin Suet Chu	24	1.70 m (5 ft 7 in)	Hong Kong	Asia
Hungary	Claudia Kozma	21	1.70 m (5 ft 7 in)	Budapest	Europe
India	Rochelle Maria Rao	23	1.70 m (5 ft 7 in)	Chennai	Asia
Indonesia	Liza Elly Purnamasari	21	1.75 m (5 ft 9 in)	Malang	Asia
Israel	Yael Markovich	23	1.68 m (5 ft 6 in)	Haifa	Asia
Italy	Giulia Masala	19	1.76 m (5 ft 9 1/2 in)	Ploaghe	Europe
Japan	Ikumi Yoshimatsu	25	1.70 m (5 ft 7 in)	Saga	Asia
Latvia	Kristīna Viļuma	22	1.68 m (5 ft 6 in)	Riga	Europe
Lebanon	Cynthia Moukarzel	24	1.65 m (5 ft 5 in)	Beirut	Asia
Macau	Cherry Ng	25	1.68 m (5 ft 6 in)	Macau	Asia
Malaysia	Mei Xian Teng	21	1.76 m (5 ft 9 1/2 in)	Perak	Asia
Mauritius	Ameeksha Dilchand	25	1.76 m (5 ft 9 1/2 in)	Port Louis	Africa
Mexico	Jessica García Formenti	22	1.79 m (5 ft 10 1/2 in)	La Paz	Americas
Mongolia	Dolgion Delgerjav	21	1.77 m (5 ft 9 1/2 in)	Ulaanbaatar	Asia
Myanmar	Nang Khin Zay Yar	24	1.68 m (5 ft 6 in)	Taunggyi	Asia
Namibia	Paulina Malulu	23	1.75 m (5 ft 9 in)	Windhoek	Africa
Nepal	Subeksha Khadka	18	1.65 m (5 ft 5 in)	Lalitpur	Asia
New Zealand	Hannah Carson	25	1.70 m (5 ft 7 in)	Auckland	Oceania
Nicaragua	Reyna Pérez	20	1.75 m (5 ft 9 in)	Chinandega	Americas
Panama	Karen Jordán Beitia	23	1.73 m (5 ft 8 in)	David	Americas
Paraguay	Nicole Huber	22	1.74 m (5 ft 8 1/2 in)	Asunción	Americas
Peru	Rossmary Pizarro	25	1.75 m (5 ft 9 in)	Iquitos	Americas
Philippines	Nicole Schmitz	24	1.73 m (5 ft 8 in)	Cebu City	Asia
Poland	Rozalia Mancewicz	25	1.75 m (5 ft 9 in)	Białystok	Europe
Portugal	Joana Peta	22	1.75 m (5 ft 9 in)	Faro	Europe
Puerto Rico	Ashley Ruiz	24	1.75 m (5 ft 9 in)	Rincón	Americas
Russia	Ekaterina Meglinskaia	20	1.75 m (5 ft 9 in)	Saratov	Europe
Singapore	Leong Ying Mae	22	1.75 m (5 ft 9 in)	Singapore	Asia
Slovak Republic	Denisa Krajčovičová	24	1.72 m (5 ft 7 1/2 in)	Bratislava	Europe
South Korea	Lee Jung-bin	19	1.74 m (5 ft 8 1/2 in)	Gwangju	Asia
Spain	Ana Amparo Crespo	22	1.76 m (5 ft 9 1/2 in)	Valencia	Europe
Sri Lanka	Madusha Mayadunne	25	1.76 m (5 ft 9 1/2 in)	Colombo	Asia
Suriname	Wynona Redmond	25	1.75 m (5 ft 9 in)	Paramaribo	Americas
Sweden	Katarina Konow	19	1.74 m (5 ft 8 1/2 in)	Stockholm	Europe
Tahiti	Ariirau Sandras	22	1.74 m (5 ft 8 1/2 in)	Papeete	Oceania
Taiwan	Nianyu Yu	20	1.62 m (5 ft 4 in)	Taipei	Asia
Thailand	Rungsinee Panjaburi	21	1.67 m (5 ft 5 1/2 in)	Lamphun	Asia
Turkey	Meltem Tüzüner	23	1.78 m (5 ft 10 in)	Istanbul	Europe
Ukraine	Julia Gershun	23	1.76 m (5 ft 9 1/2 in)	Dnipropetrovsk	Europe
United Kingdom	Alize Lily Mounter	24	1.79 m (5 ft 10 1/2 in)	London	Europe
United States	Amanda Renee Delgado	22	1.75 m (5 ft 9 in)	Los Angeles	Americas
United States Virgin Islands	Vanessa Donastorg	23	1.79 m (5 ft 10 1/2 in)	Saint Thomas	Americas
Venezuela	Blanca Aljibes	24	1.79 m (5 ft 10 1/2 in)	Valencia	Americas

== Notes ==
=== Debuts ===
- Cameroon
- Gibraltar
- Haiti
- Namibia
- United States Virgin Islands

=== Returns ===
Last competed in 1961:

- Myanmar (as Burma)

Last competed in 2005:

- Israel

Last competed in 2008:

- Suriname

Last competed in 2009:

- Argentina
- Gabon

Last competed in 2010:

- Canada
- Mauritius
- Nicaragua
- Sri Lanka
- United Kingdom

=== Withdrawals ===
- Aruba
- China – Zhang Chengcheng
- Cuba
- Georgia – Mariam Girmisashvili
- Hawaii
- Kyrgyzstan
- Netherlands
- Romania
- South Africa – Donique Leonard
- Tanzania – Winfrida Dominic
- Trinidad and Tobago
- Vietnam
- Zimbabwe

=== Did not compete ===
- Ethiopia – Melkam Endale
