= Miss Colombia 2009 =

- Date: November 16, 2009
- Presenters: Carlos Calero; Carolina Cruz; Andrea Serna
- Entertainment: Paulina Rubio; Jorge Celedón
- Venue: Auditorio Barahona, Centro de Convenciones Julio César Turbay, Cartagena de Indias
- Broadcaster: RCN TV
- Entrants: 24
- Placements: 10
- Winner: Natalia Navarro; Bolívar
- Congeniality: Vanessa Garrido; Caldas
- Best National Costume: Viviana Gómez; Meta
- Photogenic: Natalia Navarro; Bolívar

Miss Colombia 2009, the 75th Miss Colombia pageant, was held at the Centro de Convenciones in Cartagena de Indias, Colombia, on Monday, November 16, 2009. Miss Colombia 2008, Michelle Rouillard, crowned Natalia Navarro from the department of Bolívar as the new Miss Colombia. Natalia competed in Miss Universe 2010 being in the top 15.

== Results ==
=== Placements ===
Placement	Contestant
Miss Colombia 2009	Bolívar – Natalia Navarro
1st Runner-Up	Meta – Leydi Viviana Gómez
2nd Runner-Up	Cundinamarca – Carolina Rodríguez
3rd Runner-Up	Antioquia – Macri Vélez
4th Runner-Up	Risaralda – María Alejandra Franco*
Top 10	Atlántico – Laura Núñez; Bogotá – Juliana Robledo; Huila – Mayra Roa; Quindío – Oriana Hernández; Sucre - Laura Peñuela

* Laura Núñez resigned the title as Tercera Princesa (4th Runner-up)

=== Special awards ===
- Miss Photogenic (voted by press reporters) - Natalia Navarro (Bolívar)
- Best Body Figura Bodytech - Natalia Navarro (Bolívar)
- Miss Elegance - Carolina Rodríguez (Cundinamarca)
- Best Face (Rostro Jolie) - Natalia Navarro (Bolívar)
- Reina de la policia - Leydi Viviana Gómez (Meta)
- Señorita Puntualidad - Sara Ordóñez (Cesar)
- Best Regional Costume - Leydi Viviana Gómez (Meta)
- Miss Congeniality - Vanessa Garrido (Caldas)
- Zapatilla Real - Carolina Rodríguez (Cundinamarca)

=== Final competition scores ===
Departament	Evening Gown	Swimsuit
Bolívar	9.9 (1)	9.9 (1)
Meta	9.7 (2)	9.7 (2)
Cundinamarca	9.5 (3)	9.5 (3)
Antioquia	9.4 (5)	9.6 (5)
Risaralda	9.4 (5)	9.4 (5)
Atlántico	9.5 (3)	9.5 (3)
Sucre	9.4 (5)	9.4 (5)
Bogotá D.C	9.2 (8)	9.2 (8)
Quindío	9.2 (8)	9.2 (8)
Huila	9.2 (8)	9.2 (8)
Cartagena	8.8	
Guajira	8.8	
San Andrés, P. y S. C.	8.7	
Tolima	8.7	
Boyacá	8.6	
Santander	8.6	
Cesar	8.5	
Chocó	8.5	
Cauca	8.4	
Norte de Santander	8.4	
Valle	8.4	
Caldas	8.2	
Córdoba	8.0	
Magdalena	8.0	

Legend
Miss Colombia 2009
1st Runner-up
2nd Runner-up
3rd Runner-up
4th Runner-up
Semifinalists

== Delegates ==
24 delegates competed in the 2009 edition of the national pageant.

Department or city	Name	Age	Height	Hometown
Antioquia	Macri Elena Vélez Sánchez	20	172 cm (5 ft 7 1/2 in)	Medellín
Atlántico	Laura Carolina Núñez Armenta	21	173 cm (5 ft 8 in)	Barranquilla
Bogotá	Juliana Robledo Reyes	22	175 cm (5 ft 9 in)	Bogotá
Bolívar	Natalia Navarro Galvis	22	179 cm (5 ft 10 1/2 in)	Barranquilla
Boyacá	Cindy Marion Jaimes Cárdenas	19	177 cm (5 ft 9 1/2 in)	Sogamoso
Caldas	Vanessa Garrido Mejía	22	170 cm (5 ft 7 in)	Manizales
Cartagena	Verónica Dávila-Pestana Milano	23	172 cm (5 ft 7 1/2 in)	Cartagena
Cauca	Karen Adriana Mamián Fernández	24	175 cm (5 ft 9 in)	La Vega
Cesar	Sara Amanda Ordóñez Herrera	24	178 cm (5 ft 10 in)	El Copey
Chocó	Ledys Johanna Mosquera Palacios	21	168 cm (5 ft 6 in)	Turbo
Córdoba	Carmen Isabel Márquez Márquez	24	168 cm (5 ft 6 in)	Planeta Rica
Cundinamarca	Carolina Rodríguez Ferrero	24	174 cm (5 ft 8 1/2 in)	Bogotá
Guajira	María Rita Núñez Vega	23	172 cm (5 ft 7 1/2 in)	San Juan del Cesar
Huila	Mayra Alejandra Roa Rojas	23	170 cm (5 ft 7 in)	Neiva
Magdalena	Angélica Diazgranados Rodríguez	24	170 cm (5 ft 7 in)	Cali
Meta	Leydi Viviana Gómez Cortés	21	169 cm (5 ft 6 1/2 in)	Yotoco
Norte de Santander	Karen Ana Ivone Ortega Cuervo	19	166 cm (5 ft 5 1/2 in)	Cúcuta
Quindío	Oriana Hernández Buitrago	23	173 cm (5 ft 8 in)	Medellín
Risaralda	María Alejandra Franco Zapata	20	168 cm (5 ft 6 in)	Pereira
San Andrés, P. y S. C.	Shellyann de Ávila de Armas	20	180 cm (5 ft 11 in)	San Andrés
Santander	Silvia Vanessa Becerra Hernández	21	170 cm (5 ft 7 in)	Bucaramanga
Sucre	Laura Marcela Peñuela González	20	169 cm (5 ft 6 1/2 in)	Corozal
Tolima	Sofía Cecilia Upegui Bonilla	22	175 cm (5 ft 9 in)	Ibagué
Valle	Diana María Salgado Salazar	25	178 cm (5 ft 10 in)	Cali

=== Notes ===
- Carolina Rodríguez (Cundinamarca) held the title of Top Model of The World 2010.
- Natalia Navarro was in the Top 15 (12th Runner-up) at Miss Universe 2010.
- Macry Elena Vélez was in the Top 5 at Miss Intercontinental 2010.
