= Miss Colombia 2008 =

Beauty pageant edition

- Date: November 17, 2008
- Presenters: Carlos Calero; Carolina Cruz; Andrea Serna; Claudia Bahamón
- Entertainment: Rosario Flores, Fanny Lú, Antonio Carmona
- Venue: Auditorio Barahona, Centro de Convenciones Julio César Turbay, Cartagena de Indias
- Broadcaster: RCN TV
- Entrants: 25
- Placements: 10
- Winner: Michelle Rouillard; Cauca
- Congeniality: Cindy Kohn; Guajira
- Best National Costume: Andrea Tirado; Sucre
- Photogenic: Michelle Rouillard; Cauca

Miss Colombia 2008, the 74th Miss Colombia pageant, was held in Cartagena de Indias, Colombia, on November 17, 2008, after two weeks of events. The winner of the pageant was Michelle Rouillard, Miss Cauca.

The pageant was broadcast live on RCN TV from the Centro de Convenciones Julio César Turbay in Cartagena de Indias, Colombia. At the conclusion of the final night of competition, outgoing titleholder Miss Colombia 2007 Taliana Vargas crowned Michelle Rouillard of Cauca as the new Miss Colombia.

== Judges ==
The panel of judges was composed by Olga Sinclair (Panama), Pablo Jiménez Burillo (Spain), Sylvia Loria (Costa Rica), Thomas P. Murray (United States), Giovanni Scutaro (Venezuela).

== Results ==
=== Placements ===
Placement	Contestant
Miss Colombia 2008	Cauca – Michelle Rouillard
1st Runner-Up	Chocó – Lina Mosquera Ochoa
2nd Runner-Up	Antioquia – Verónica Velásquez
3rd Runner-Up	Valle – Stephanie Garcés Aljure
4th Runner-Up	Sucre – Andrea Lilian Tirado Reina
Top 10	Atlántico – Paula Alejandra González; Norte de Santander – Andrea Ontiveros Casas; Quindío – Leydi Mejía Urrego; Cartagena – Giselle Marín Ramos

* Sonia Janneth Cubides (Bogotá D.C.) and María Jimena Escobar (Cundinamarca) resign the title as Segunda Princesa (3rd Runner-up)

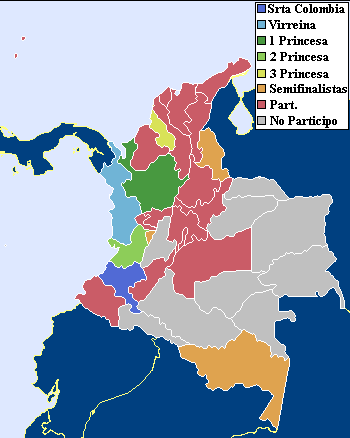
Departments which sent delegates and results.

=== Special awards ===
- Miss Photogenic (voted by press reporters) - Michelle Rouillard Estrada (Cauca)
- Best Body Figura Bodytech - Stephanie Garcés Aljure (Valle)
- Miss Elegance - Lina Marcela Mosquera Ochoa (Chocó)
- Best Face - Ina Andrea Ontiveros Casas (Norte de Santander)
- Reina de la policia - Lina Marcela Mosquera Ochoa (Chocó)
- Señorita Puntualidad - Sonia Janneth Cubides Silva (Bogotá D.C.)
- Best Regional Costume - Andrea Lilian Tirado Reina (Sucre) - "Pola Becté", Design by Erick Pérez
- Miss Congeniality - Cindy Kohn Cybulkiewicz (Guajira)
- Zapatilla Real - Giselle Marín Ramos (Cartagena D.T. y C.)

=== Final competition scores ===
Departament	Evening Gown	Swimsuit
Cauca	9.8	9.8
Chocó	9.8	9.4
Antioquia	9.1	9.3
Cundinamarca	9.3	9.4
Valle	8.7	8.9
Bogotá D.C.	9.1*	9.4
Norte de Santander	9.0	8.9
Quindío	8.7	8.9
Amazonas	9.1	9.0
Cartagena D.T. y C.	8.9	8.7
Sucre	8.5	
Atlántico	8.4	
Boyacá	8.4	
Caldas	8.2	
Guajira	8.2	
Bolívar	8.1	
Huila	8.1	
Cesar	8.0	
Córdoba	8.0	
Meta	8.0	
Risaralda	8.0	
Santander	8.0	
Nariño	7.9	
Magdalena	7.8	
San Andrés, P. y S.C.	7.7	

Legend
Miss Colombia 2008–2009
First runner-up
Second runner-up
Third runner-up
Fourth runner-up
Semifinalistas

== Delegates ==
According to a press release from September 11 of 2008 on the website of the National Beauty Contest of Colombia, the official candidates were:

Contestant	Name	Age	Height	Hometown
Amazonas	Paula Alejandra González Gutiérrez	22	177 cm (5 ft 9 1/2 in)	Neiva
Antioquia	Verónica Velásquez Gómez	20	174 cm (5 ft 8 1/2 in)	Medellín
Atlántico	Valeria Margarita Sierra Caballero	22	167 cm (5 ft 5 1/2 in)	Barranquilla
Bogotá D.C.	Sonia Janneth Cubides Silva	24	173 cm (5 ft 8 in)	Bogotá
Bolívar	Karen Margarita Bray Vergara	22	168 cm (5 ft 6 in)	El Carmen de Bolívar
Boyacá	Cindy Yulieth Calle Páramo	19	166 cm (5 ft 5 1/2 in)	Bogotá
Caldas	Marcela Muñoz Vargas	22	169 cm (5 ft 6 1/2 in)	Manizales
Cartagena D.T. y C.	Giselle Marín Ramos	19	176 cm (5 ft 9 1/2 in)	Cartagena de Indias
Cauca	Michelle Rouillard	22	174 cm (5 ft 8 1/2 in)	Popayán
Cesar	Linda Cristina Mendoza Vargas	23	165 cm (5 ft 5 in)	San Juan del Cesar
Chocó	Lina Marcela Mosquera Ochoa	19	178 cm (5 ft 10 in)	Quibdó
Córdoba	Sara Piedrahíta Lyons	19	169 cm (5 ft 6 1/2 in)	Montería
Cundinamarca	María Jimena Escobar Fuenmayor	21	170 cm (5 ft 7 in)	Bogotá
Guajira	Cindy Kohn Cybulkiewicz	21	167 cm (5 ft 5 1/2 in)	Maicao
Huila	Ángela María Rojas Morera	22	177 cm (5 ft 9 1/2 in)	Neiva
Magdalena	María Pinedo Manrique	23	166 cm (5 ft 5 1/2 in)	Santa Marta
Meta	Laura Naranjo Gómez	23	174 cm (5 ft 8 1/2 in)	Villavicencio
Nariño	Briggite Geraldine Bolaños Chala	18	171 cm (5 ft 7 1/2 in)	Cali
Norte de Santander	Ina Andrea Ontiveros Casas	22	175 cm (5 ft 9 in)	Cúcuta
Quindío	Leidy Marcela Mejía Urrego	20	176 cm (5 ft 9 1/2 in)	Cali
Risaralda	Jeny Maritza Guzmán Tamayo	21	166 cm (5 ft 5 1/2 in)	Pereira
San Andrés, P. y S.C.	Hannia Yihan Gallardo Harb	22	162 cm (5 ft 4 in)	San Andrés
Santander	María Alejandra Sampayo Guerrero	20	165 cm (5 ft 5 in)	Bucaramanga
Sucre	Andrea Lilian Tirado Reina	23	171 cm (5 ft 7 1/2 in)	Bogotá
Valle	Stephanie Garcés Aljure	23	178 cm (5 ft 10 in)	Cali

=== Withdrawals ===
- Marianna Rodriguez was replaced by Stephanie Garcés Aljure as Señorita Valle after pictures of Marianna posing in underwear surfaced.
- Sonia Janneth Cubides Silva resigned her title as Segunda Princesa to pursuit an acting career.
