= Miss Colombia 2007 =

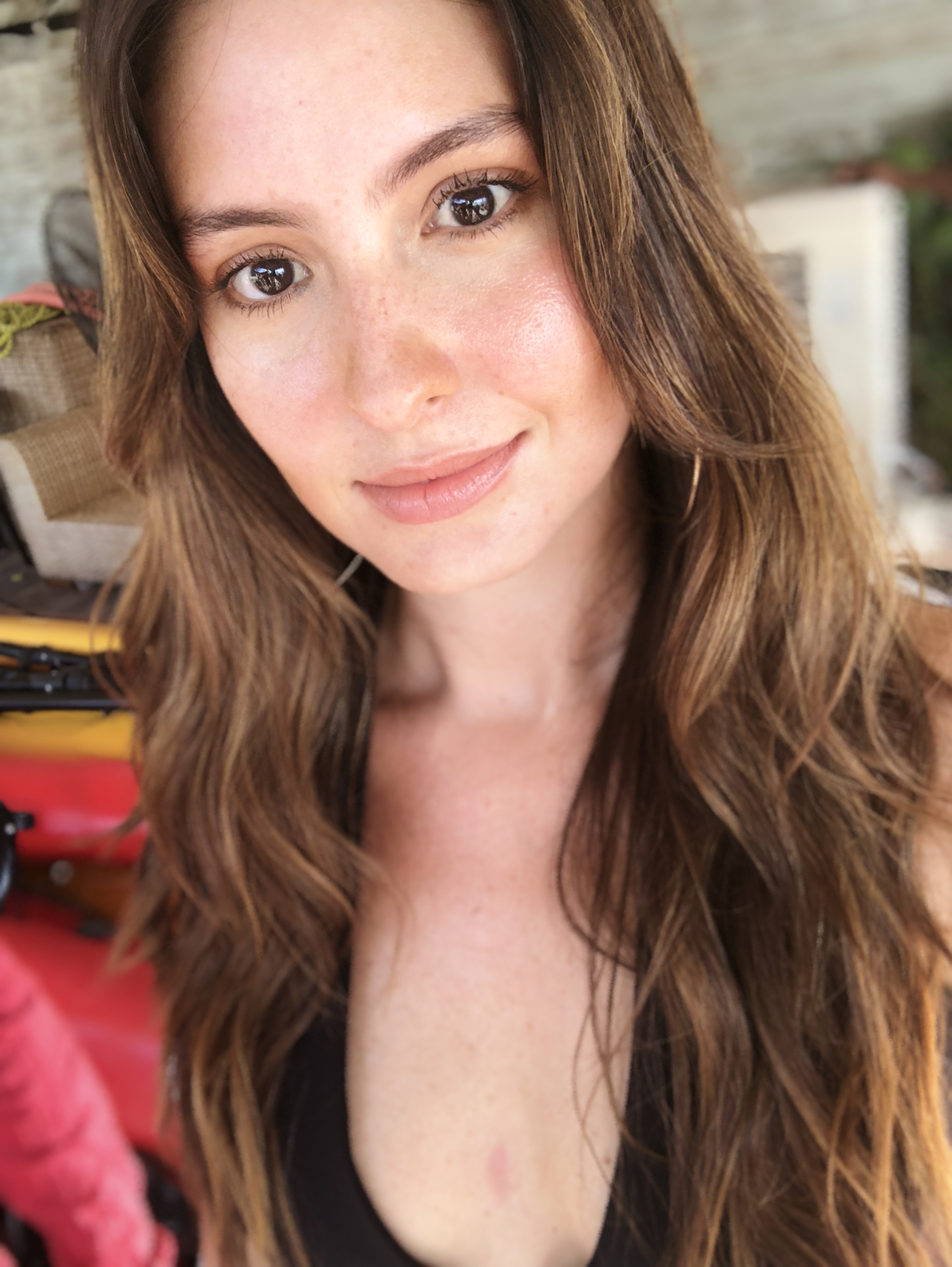
- Vargas in 2018
- Date: November 12, 2007
- Presenters: Andrea Serna; Carlos Calero; Carolina Cruz
- Venue: Centro de Convenciones Cartagena de Indias, Cartagena de Indias
- Broadcaster: RCN TV
- Entrants: 24
- Placements: 10
- Winner: Taliana Vargas; Magdalena
- Congeniality: Carolina Gulfo; Córdoba
- Best National Costume: Antonia Moncada; Antioquia
- Photogenic: Gloria Perez; Sucre

Miss Colombia 2007, the 73rd Miss Colombia pageant, was held in Cartagena de Indias, Colombia, on November 12, 2007. The pageant was broadcast live on RCN TV from the Centro de Convenciones Cartagena de Indias in Cartagena de Indias, Colombia. At the conclusion of the final night of competition, outgoing titleholder Miss Colombia 2006 Eileen Roca Torralvo of Cesar crowned Taliana Vargas of Magdalena as the new Señorita Colombia. Vargas later placed 1st Runner-Up at the 2008 Miss Universe pageant.

== Results ==
=== Placements ===
Placement	Contestant
Miss Colombia 2007	Magdalena – Taliana Vargas
1st Runner-Up	Bogotá – María Cristina Díaz-Granados
2nd Runner-Up	Atlántico – Cristina Camargo
3rd Runner-Up	Valle – Catalina Giraldo Flórez
4th Runner-Up	Cundinamarca – Emma Carolina Cruz
Top 10	Antioquia – Maria Antonia Moncada Cartés; Cartagena — Negaria Roa Olier; Córdoba – Carolina Gulfo Guerra; Cúcuta – Sarah Juliana Monsalve; Risaralda – Maria Fernanda Trejos

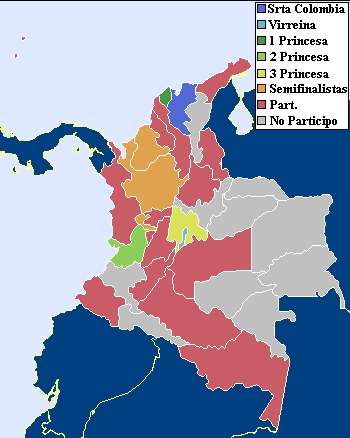
Departments which sent delegates and results.

=== Special awards ===
- Miss Photogenic (voted by press reporters) - Gloria Patricia Pérez (Sucre)
- Best Body Figura Bodytech- Maria Cristina Diaz-Granados (Bogotá)
- Miss Elegance - Taliana Vargas (Magdalena)
- Best Face - Taliana Vargas (Magdalena)
- Reina de la policia - Taliana Vargas (Magdalena)
- Señorita Puntualidad - Marieta Luz Juan Guardela (Bolívar)
- Best Regional Costume - María Antonia Moncada Cortés (Antioquia)
- Miss Congeniality - Carolina Gulfo Guerra (Córdoba)
- Zapatilla Real - Priscilla Mendoza Méndez (Guajira)

== Delegates ==
The Miss Colombia 2007 delegates are:

- Amazonas - Marcia Alejandra Vallejo Londoño
- Antioquia - María Antonia Moncada Cortés
- Atlántico - Cristina Lucía Camargo de la Rans
- Bogotá - María Cristina Díaz Granados Dangond
- Bolívar - Marieta Luz Juan Guardela
- Caldas - Valentina Uribe Llano
- Cartagena DT y C - Negaira Inés Roa Olier
- Chocó - Cinthia Yarleidy Caicedo Perea
- Córdoba - Carolina Gulfo Guerra
- Cúcuta - Sarah Juliana Monsalve Roldán
- Cundinamarca - Emma Carolina Cruz Contento
- Guajira - Priscilla Mendoza Méndez
- Huila - Silvana Delgado Vargas
- Magdalena - Taliana María Vargas Carrillo
- Meta - Jennifer Kristin Arias Falla
- Nariño - María Cristina Barbato Gaviria
- Norte de Santander - María Alejandra Ramírez García
- Quindío - Anyela Paola Herrera Sánchez
- Risaralda - María Fernanda Trejos Morales
- San Andrés Y Providencia - Melinda Melandra Escalona Henry
- Santander - Yuli Tatiana Bautista Rodríguez
- Sucre - Gloria Patricia Pérez Peñuela
- Tolima - Juliana Andrea Caballero Castaño
- Valle - Catalina Giraldo Flórez
