= Miss Colombia 2025 =

71st edition of the Miss Colombia competition

- Date: November 17, 2025
- Presenters: Catalina Robayo; Nathaly Colón
- Venue: Las Américas Hotel Convention Center, Cartagena
- Broadcaster: Canal 1; Telepacífico; Canal TRO; Teleislas; ¡Hola! TV
- Entrants: 26
- Placements: 10
- Withdrawals: Antioquia; Andean Region; Boyacá; Bucaramanga; Cúcuta; Meta; Putumayo; Quindío; San Andrés y Providencia
- Returns: Caqueta; Cauca; Magdalena; Santa Marta
- Winner: María Antonia Mosquera (Valle del Cauca)
- Congeniality: Valeria Lafaurie (Caribbean Region)
- Best National Costume: María Antonia Mosquera (Valle del Cauca); María José Ayazo (Bolívar)

Miss Colombia 2025 was the 71st Miss Colombia pageant, held at the Las Américas Hotel Convention Center in Cartagena, Bolívar, on November 17, 2025.

Nicolle Ospina, of Atlántico crowned María Antonia Mosquera of Valle del Cauca as the successor of Catalina Duque of Antioquia at the conclusion of the event. (Note: Catalina Duque was at the Miss International 2025 competition, so Nicolle Ospina, Miss Colombia 2024 1st runner-up, was in charge of crowning the new Miss Colombia.) This was Valle del Cauca's thirteenth victory in the history of the competition, making it the department with the most victories.

The pageant featured contestants from a record 26 departments, cities, and regions. Miss Colombia 2010 Catalina Robayo hosted the competition for the second consecutive year, along with Nathaly Colón. Juan Carlos Coronel performed in this edition.

== Background ==
=== Location and date ===
In August 2025, the Miss Colombia organization announced the pageant, highlighting the efforts of Cartagena's Mayor, Dumek Turbay, to hold the event as part of Cartagena's Independence Day celebrations. Later, the organization announced that the date would be November 17, 2025.

=== Selection of participants ===
Contestants from twenty-six departments, cities, and regions were selected to compete in the pageant. Five of these delegates were appointed to the position by local organizations in their respective cities or departments after having been finalists in their respective local pageants or having been chosen through a selection process.

=== Debuts, returns and withdrawals ===
This edition marked the return of Caqueta, which participated for the last time in 2021, Cauca and Magdalena, which participated for the last time in 2022, and Santa Marta, which participated for the last time in 2002.

== Results ==
- The contestant won an international pageant.
- The contestant was a finalist/runner-up in an international pageant.
- The contestant was a semi-finalist in an international pageant.

Placement	Contestant	International placement
Miss Colombia 2025	Valle del Cauca - María Antonia Mosquera	TBA – Miss International 2026
1st runner-up	Atlántico – Valentina Olano Wightman	TBA – Miss Charm 2026
2nd runner-up	Chocó – Kristy Moreno	
3rd runner-up	Córdoba – Martha Isabel Otero	1st Runner-Rp – Reina Hispanoamericana 2026
4th runner-up	Bolívar – María José Ayazo	
Top 10	Caquetá – Luisa Fernanda Álvarez	1st Runner Up – Miss Mesoamerica 2026
Top 10	Cauca – Karen Daniela Riascos; Caribbean Region – Valeria Lafaurie Santo Domingo; Risaralda – Luisa Fernanda Trujillo; Santa Marta – Laura Saavedra	

=== Special awards ===
Award	Contestant
Best National Costume	Valle del Cauca – María Antonia Mosquera; Bolívar – María José Ayazo
Miss Congeniality	Caribbean Region – Valeria Lafaurie Santo Domingo
Miss Elegance Primatela	Valle del Cauca – María Antonia Mosquera
Queen of the National Police	Santander – Paula González
Captain of the National Navy	Tolima – Laura Alvarado

==== Caribbean Jewelry Emerald Award ====
Award	Contestant
Award by Caribbean Jewelry Emerald	Barranquilla – Alexandra Cianci

== Contestants ==
Twenty-six contestants competed for the title.

Department/City	Contestant	Age (Note: Ages at the time of the pageant)	Hometown
Andean Region	María Paz Ruíz	23	Remedios
Atlántico	Valentina Olano Wightman	24	Barranquilla
Barranquilla	Alexandra Cianci	24	Barranquilla
Bogotá	María Paula Vallejo	23	Bogotá
Bolívar	María José Ayazo	26	Cartagena
Buenaventura	Meilin Grueso	20	Buenaventura
Caqueta	Laura Fernanda Álvarez	25	Cartagena del Chairá
Caribbean Region	Valeria Lafaurie Santo Domingo	24	Barranquilla
Cartagena	María Paula Berrío	19	Cartagena
Cauca	Karen Riascos	20	Totoró
Cesar	María Camila Tamayo	25	Valledupar
Chocó	Kristy Moreno	23	Quibdó
Córdoba	Martha Isabel Otero	24	Montería
Cundinamarca	Valeria Herrada Scheller	25	Girardot
La Guajira	Lilia Ballesteros	26	San Juan del Cesar
Huila	Ana María Palomo	24	Neiva
Magdalena	Ana Camila del Toro Avendaño	25	Santa Marta
Nariño	Laura Betancourt	20	Pasto
Norte de Santander	Daniela Pinzón Visbal	25	Cúcuta
Riohacha	María Lucía Poveda	23	Riohacha
Risaralda	Luisa Fernanda Trujillo	26	Manizales
Santa Marta	Laura Saavedra	25	Santa Marta
Santander	Paula González Bravo	23	Barrancabermeja
Sucre	Valeria Aguirre Romero	20	Corozal
Tolima	Laura Alvarado	22	Ibagué
Valley	María Antonia Mosquera	25	Cali
