= Miss Colombia 1999 =

- Date: November 12, 1999
- Presenters: Jorge Alfredo Vargas and Carolina Gómez
- Venue: Centro de Convenciones Julio Cesar Turbay, Cartagena de Indias, Colombia
- Broadcaster: RCN TV
- Entrants: 21
- Winner: Catalina Acosta Albarracín; Cundinamarca
- Congeniality: Talia Vejarano; Bolívar
- Best National Costume: Ana María Rujeles; Meta
- Photogenic: Olga Milena Flórez; Sucre

Miss Colombia 1999, the 64th Miss Colombia pageant, was held in Cartagena de Indias, Colombia, on November 12, 1999, after three weeks of events. The winner of the pageant was Catalina Acosta, Señorita Cundinamarca.

The pageant was broadcast live on RCN TV from the Centro de Convenciones Julio Cesar Turbay in Cartagena de Indias, Colombia. At the conclusion of the final night of competition, outgoing titleholder Marianella Maal crowned Catalina Acosta of Cundinamarca as the new Miss Colombia.

Carolina Cruz, who went on to become a presenter, won first runner-up.

== Results ==
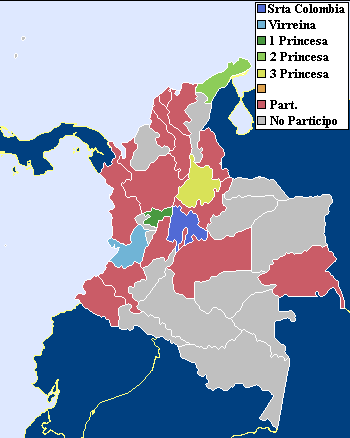
Departments which sent delegates and results.

=== Placements ===
Placement	Contestant
Miss Colombia 1999	Cundinamarca − Catalina Acosta
1st runner-up	Valle del Cauca − Carolina Cruz
2nd runner-up	Caldas − Raquel Cecilia Jaramillo
3rd runner-up	La Guajira − Paola Andrea Illidge Uribe
4th runner-up	Santander − Claudia Lucía Rey Cote

=== Special awards ===
Award	Contestant
Miss Pothogenic	Sucre − Olga Milena Flórez
Miss Congeniality	Bolívar − Talia Vejarano
Best National Costume	Meta − Ana María Rujeles
Queen of the National Police	Valle del Cauca − Carolina Cruz
Best in Punctuality	Norte de Santander − Sandra Elizabeth Peréz

== Contestants ==
Twenty-one contestants competed for the title.

Department/City	Contestant	Age (Note: Ages at the time of the pageant)
Antioquia	Alejandra Vélez Londoño	22
Atlántico	Liliana María Salazar Lara	22
Barranquilla	Caroll Marcela Nobman Rocha	19
Bogotá	Catalina Molano Vega	20
Bolívar	Talia Maia Vejarano Bravo	20
Boyacá	Katherin Carolina Nieto Abaunza	21
Caldas	Raquel Cecilia Jaramillo Castrillo	21
Cartagena	Karen Cecilia Martínez Insignares	20
Cauca	María Paola Vejarano Restrepo	23
Chocó	Isneida Ortiz Salazar	21
Cundinamarca	Catalina Inés Acosta Albarracín	21
Guainía	Yeris Paola Sepúlveda García	19
La Guajira	Paola Andrea Illidge Uribe	18
Magdalena	Carolina Hoyos Soto	19
Meta	Ana María Rujeles Flórez	24
Nariño	Rosa Janeth Coral Restrepo	18
Norte de Santander	Sandra Elizabeth Pérez Pernía	22
Santander	Claudia Lucía Rey Cote	22
Sucre	Olga Milena Flórez Sierra	21
Tolima	Yovana Milena Flórez Flórez	21
Valle del Cauca	Carolina Cruz Osorio	20
