= Miss Universe Colombia 2018 =

Beauty pageant held in Medellín, Colombia

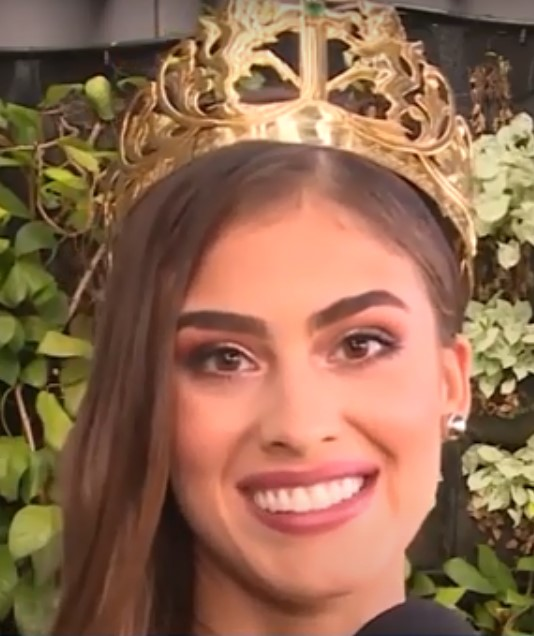
- Valeria Morales, Señorita Colombia 2018
- Date: September 30, 2018
- Presenters: Carolina Gómez; Iván Lalinde
- Entertainment: Gente de Zona; Greeicy Rendón; Mike Bahía; Gilberto Santa Rosa
- Venue: Club El Rodeo City Hall, Medellín, Antioquia
- Broadcaster: RCN TV
- Entrants: 18
- Placements: 10
- Withdrawals: Boyacá; Caldas; Córdoba; Meta; Risaralda; Tolima
- Returns: Cundinamarca
- Winner: Valeria Morales; Valle del Cauca

The Miss Colombia pageant held its 65th edition under the name Rumbo a Miss Universo. It was held at the Club El Rodeo City Hall in Medellín, Colombia on September 30, 2018. This late edition was made in order to send a representative from Colombia to the Miss Universe 2018 pageant.

At the end of the event, Laura González from Cartagena, D.T. and C. crowned Valeria Morales from Valle del Cauca as Señorita Colombia 2018. She represented Colombia at Miss Universe 2018 and was unplaced.

== Results ==
=== Placements ===
Placement	Candidate	International placement
Miss Colombia 2018	Valle – Valeria Morales	Unplaced – Miss Universe 2018
1st Runner-Up	Antioquia – Isabella Atehortúa	
2nd Runner-Up	Chocó – Alma Díaz	Unplaced – Reina Hispanoamericana 2018
Top 5	Cartagena – Nathalia Blanco; Quindío – María Andrea Arango	
Top 10	Atlántico – Mimí Carranza; Bolívar – Natalia Narváez; Cesar – Jennifer Salazar; Magdalena – Samara Saghair; Nariño – Maye Valencia	

=== Scores ===
Legend
Miss Colombia 2018
Virreina
1st Runner-Up
Top 5
Semifinalist (Top 10)

Departament	Swimsuit	Evening Gown	Average
Valle	9.8 (1)	9.9 (1)	9.85 (1)
Antioquia	9.8 (1)	9.7 (2)	9.75 (2)
Chocó	9.7 (3)	9.6 (3)	9.65 (3)
Cartagena	9.5 (5)	9.4 (6)	9.45 (5)
Quindío	9.4 (6)	9.5 (5)	9.45 (5)
Magdalena	9.6 (4)	9.6 (3)	9.60 (4)
Atlántico	9.4 (6)	9.4 (6)	9.40 (7)
Bolívar	9.2 (8)	9.1 (10)	9.15 (9)
Nariño	9.1 (9)	9.3 (8)	9.20 (8)
Cesar	9.0 (10)	9.2 (9)	9.10 (10)
Norte de Santander	9.0 (10)	9.1 (10)	9.05 (11)
Cundinamarca	8.9 (12)	9.1 (10)	9.00 (12)
Bogotá	8.8 (13)	8.9 (14)	8.85 (13)
Santander	8.8 (13)	8.7 (17)	8.75 (15)
San Andrés	8.7 (15)	8.8 (15)	8.75 (15)
Huila	8.6 (16)	9.0 (13)	8.80 (14)
Guajira	8.6 (16)	8.8 (15)	8.70 (17)
Cauca	8.6 (16)	8.6 (18)	8.60 (18)

== Specials Awards ==
Award	Winner
Miss Congeniality (Mejor Compañera)	Norte de Santander - Sandra Palacios

== Delegates ==
18 candidates were selected to compete in this edition.

Department / District	Name	Age	Hometown
Antioquia	Isabella Atehortúa Zapata	21	Rionegro
Atlántico	Miriam Isabel "Mimí" Carranza De Moya	23	Barranquilla
Bogotá D.C.	María Camila García Jiménez	21	Tumaco
Bolívar	Natalia Narváez Angulo	21	Cartagena
Cartagena, D.T. and C.	Nathalia Marcela Blanco Mathieu	22	Cartagena
Cauca	María Camila Concha Osorio	23	Popayán
Cesar	Jennifer Salazar Sánchez	25	Bucaramanga
Chocó	Alma Beatriz Díaz Bonilla	25	Turbo
Cundinamarca	Sugey Tatiana Torres Rosario	22	Soacha
Guajira	Claudia Maryam Montenegro Acosta	23	Riohacha
Huila	María de los Ángeles Sarmiento Cardoso	25	Neiva
Magdalena	Samara Saghair Granados	25	Ciénaga
Nariño	Yadiry Mayeli "Maye" Valencia Calderón	24	La Hormiga
Norte de Santander	Sandra Patricia Palacios Martínez	22	Los Patios
Quindío	María Andrea Arango Isaza	24	Armenia
San Andrés, P. and S.C.	Nirvany Natasha Bowie Steele	23	San Andrés
Santander	Evelyn Julieth Chávez Navas	21	Bucaramanga
Valle	Valeria Morales Delgado	20	Cali
