= Miss Colombia 2006 =

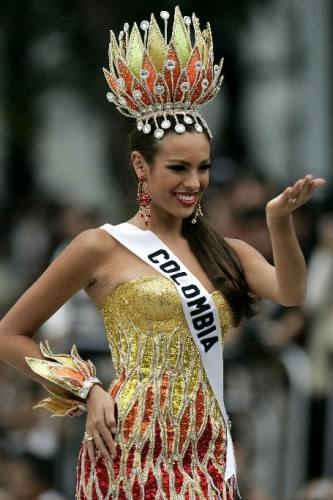
- Date: November 12, 2006
- Presenters: Carolina Cruz; Carlos Calero
- Venue: Centro de Convenciones Cartagena de Indias, Cartagena de Indias, Colombia
- Broadcaster: RCN TV
- Entrants: 23
- Placements: 10
- Winner: Eileen Roca Torralvo; Cesar
- Congeniality: Katherine Quintero; Córdoba
- Best National Costume: Isabel Agudelo; Caldas
- Photogenic: Isabel Arango; Risaralda

Miss Colombia 2006, the 72nd Miss Colombia pageant, was held in Cartagena de Indias, Colombia, on November 12, 2006. The winner of the pageant was Eileen Roca Torralvo, Miss Cesar.

The pageant was broadcast live on RCN TV from the Centro de Convenciones Cartagena de Indias in Cartagena de Indias, Colombia. At the conclusion of the final night of competition, outgoing titleholder Valerie Dominguez Tarud crowned Eileen Roca Torralvo of Cesar as the new Miss Colombia.

== Results ==
=== Placements ===
Placement	Contestant
Miss Colombia 2006	Cesar – Eileen Roca
1st Runner-Up	Guajira – Ana Milena Lamus
2nd Runner-Up	Cundinamarca – Leidy Johanna Rincón
3rd Runner-Up	Antioquia – Laura Montoya
4th Runner-Up	Chocó – Katy Mosquera
Top 10	Bogotá – Diana Marcela Acosta; Cartagena – Siad Char Tinoco; Córdoba – Katherine Quintero; Norte de Santander – Kelly Johanna Ballesteros; Valle – Stephany Ospina

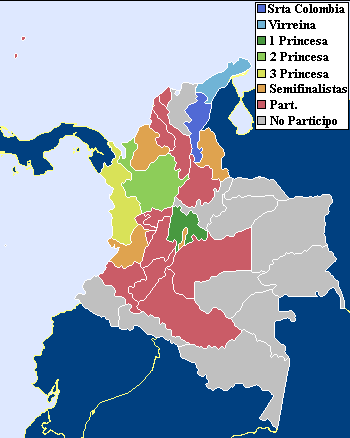
Departments which sent delegates and results.

=== Special awards ===
- Miss Photogenic (voted by press reporters) - María Isabel Arango Alzate (Risaralda)
- Best Body Figura Bodytech- Laura Montoya Escobar (Antioquia)
- Miss Elegance - Eileen Roca Torralvo (Cesar)
- Best Face - Isabel Cristina Agudelo Orozco (Caldas)
- Reina de la Policia - Kelly Johanna Ballesteros Castellanos (Norte de Santander)
- Señorita Puntualidad - Sabrina Parra Agudelo (Caqueta)

== Delegates ==
The Miss Colombia 2006 delegates are:

- Antioquia - Laura Montoya Escobar
- Atlántico - Carolina Ruiz De Castro
- Bogotá - Diana Marcela Acosta Albarracín
- Bolívar - Jennifer Emilia Lemus Yidia
- Caldas - Isabel Cristina Agudelo Orozco
- Caquetá - Sabrina Parra Agudelo
- Cartagena DT y C - Said Karime Char Tinoco
- Cauca - Diana Marcela Zúñiga Paredes
- Cesar - Eileen Roca Torralvo
- Chocó - Katy Lorena Mosquera Mena
- Córdoba - Katherine Estella Quintero Gómez
- Cundinamarca - Lady Johana Rincón Páez
- Guajira - Ana Milena Lamus Rodríguez
- Huila - Natalia Tamayo Palacio
- Meta - Mónica Esperanza Palacios Mora
- Norte de Santander - Kelly Johanna Ballesteros Castellanos
- Quindío - Laura Marcela Fernández Zuluaga
- Risaralda - María Isabel Arango Alzate
- San Andrés and Providencia - Kathrinne Alexandra Hawkins Brito
- Santander - Carolina María León Mendoza
- Sucre - Mileth Johana Agámez López
- Tolima - Adriana Lucía Barragán Londoño
- Valle - Stephany Ospina Tenorio
