= Sara Piedrahíta Lyons =

Colombian politician (born 1988)

Member of the Chamber of Representatives
- In office July 20, 2014 – July 20, 2022
- Constituency: Córdoba

Personal details
- Born: Sara Elena Piedrahíta Lyons; December 31, 1988 (age 37) Montería, Córdoba, Colombia
- Party: Union Party for the People (2014-present)
- Relatives: Alejandro Lyons (cousin)
- Education: University of the Andes

Sara Elena Piedrahíta Lyons (born December 31, 1988) is a Colombian former beauty queen, industrial engineer, and politician. From 2014 to 2022, she served as a member of the Chamber of Representatives representing her native department of Córdoba, obtaining the highest vote of her legislature during the 2014 Parliamentary election.

== Personal life ==
Sara Elena Piedrahíta Lyons was born on December 31, 1988, in Monteria, Córdoba to Rafael Piedrahíta de Leon and María Virginia Lyons, she studied at Colegio La Salle, and later at the Gimnasio Campestre de Monteria where she completed her high school studies in 2005. In 2006 He would move to Bogotá where she would begin studies in Industrial Engineering at the University of the Andes where she would graduate in 2011.

On November 28, 2022, she was accused by the Supreme Court of Justice of Colombia for links to the Cartel de la Toga, as well as having received large sums of money as a result of embezzlement carried out during the departmental administration of her cousin Alejandro Lyons as Governor of Cordoba.

== Pageantry ==
Sara Piedrahíta Lyons
- Education: University of the Andes
- Occupations: Industrial engineering; model
- Height: 1.70 m (5 ft 7 in)
- Beauty pageant titleholder
- Title: Miss Córdoba 2008
- Hair color: Brunette
- Eye color: Hazel
- Major competitions: Miss Colombia 2008 (Unplaced)

=== Miss Córdoba 2008 ===
Piedrahíta Lyons would be elected as Miss Córdoba 2008 to later represent Córdoba in Miss Colombia 2008.

=== Miss Colombia 2008 ===
Piedrahíta Lyons participated representing Córdoba in Miss Colombia 2008 where she did not obtain any placement in the Top 10.
