= Michelle Rouillard =

Colombian model and former beauty queen

- Born: Michelle Emilie Rouillard Estrada; October 28, 1986 (age 39); Popayan, Cauca, Colombia
- Education: Concordia University (BBA)
- Occupations: Actress; model
- Height: 1.75 m (5 ft 9 in)
- Beauty pageant titleholder
- Title: Miss Cauca 2008; Miss Colombia 2008
- Hair color: Coppery
- Eye color: Blue
- Major competitions: Miss Colombia 2008 (Winner); Miss Universe 2009 (Unplaced)

Michelle Emilie Rouillard Estrada (born October 28, 1986) is a French-Colombian beauty pageant titleholder, model, and actor who was crowned Miss Colombia 2008. As Miss Colombia, Rouillard represented Colombia at Miss Universe 2009, where she ended up without any placement.

== Early life ==
Rouillard was born in Popayan, Cauca, Colombia to a French father, Patrick Rouillard and Colombian mother, María del Mar Estrada. Within her studies, it stands out that she is a professional in International Business from Concordia University in Montreal, Canada. In addition to her native language, Spanish, she also speaks English and French. She pursued studies in dramatic arts and made her professional acting debut in the telenovela La teacher de Inglés. In her modeling career, she has appeared in numerous runway presentations and is represented by the Stock Models agency.

Michelle has stated in interviews that she is interested in esoteric practices and astrology. In January 2022, she described herself as a practitioner of Vedic astrology and said she had been interested in esoteric subjects since childhood. She also stated that she had her natal chart prepared when she was young and later did not observe the predictions to correspond with real-life events.

== Pageantry ==
=== Miss Colombia 2008 ===
On November 17, 2008, Rouillard represented her native Cauca department in the Miss Colombia 2008 held at the Barahona Auditorium, Julio César Turbay Convention Center, Cartagena, Bolívar.

During the special award ceremony she received the special award, Miss Photogenic.

=== Miss Universe 2009 ===
Rouillard represented Colombia in the Miss Universe 2009 pageant.

It was held on August 23, 2009, in Nassau, Bahamas, where she did not qualify for the final phase.

Awards and achievements
Preceded by Taliana Vargas	Miss Colombia; 2008	Succeeded by Natalia Navarro
Preceded by Diana Zúñiga	Miss Cauca; 2008	Succeeded by Karen Mamián Fernández
