= Miss Colombia 2004 =

- Date: November 12, 2004
- Presenters: María José Barraza; Jorge Alfredo Vargas
- Venue: Centro de Convenciones Cartagena de Indias, Cartagena de Indias, Colombia
- Broadcaster: RCN TV
- Entrants: 21
- Placements: 10
- Winner: Adriana Tarud Duran; Atlántico
- Congeniality: Maria Julia Quessep; Sucre
- Best National Costume: Adriana Tarud Duran; Atlántico
- Photogenic: Laura Abisambra; Magdalena

Miss Colombia 2004, the 70th Miss Colombia pageant, was held in Cartagena de Indias, Colombia, on November 12, 2004, after three weeks of events. The winner of the pageant was Adriana Tarud, Miss Atlántico.

The pageant was broadcast live on RCN TV from the Centro de Convenciones Julio Cesar Turbay in Cartagena de Indias, Colombia. At the conclusion of the final night of competition, outgoing titleholder Catherine Daza Manchola crowned Adriana Tarud of Atlántico as the new Miss Colombia.

== Results ==
=== Placements ===
Placement	Contestant
Miss Colombia 2004	Atlántico – Adriana Tarud Duran
1st Runner-Up	Valle – Diana Arbelaez Gonzalez
2nd Runner-Up	Antioquia – Tatiana Bastidas Castañeda
3rd Runner-Up	San Andrés, P and S.C. – Andrea Gallardo Zukzuk
4th Runner-Up	Norte de Santander – Diana Cepeda Castro
Top 10	Cundinamarca – Alejandra Aldana; Guajira – Aylen Borrego; Magdalena – Laura Abisambra; Santander – Linda Consuegra Leal; Sucre – Maria Julia Quessep

=== Special awards ===
- Miss Photogenic (voted by press reporters) - Silvana Patricia Altahona López (Meta)
- Best Body Figura Bodytech - Valerie Dominguez Tarud (Atlántico)
- Miss Congeniality - Liliana del Carmen Morales Barrios (Bolívar)
- Best Costume - Ana María Castañeda (Sucre)
- Reina de la Policia - Claudia Margarita González Dangond (Cesar)
- Señorita Puntualidad - Claudia Margarita González Dangond (Cesar)
- Miss Elegance - Karina Guerra Rodriguez (Chocó)

== Delegates ==
The Miss Colombia 2004 delegates were:

- Antioquia - Tatiana Maria Bastidas Castañeda
- Atlántico - Adriana Cecilia Tarud Duran
- Bogotá - Nawal Michelle Ayoub Valderrama
- Bolívar - Lia Patricia Correal Lopera
- Boyacá - Yuri Alix Cruz Suarez
- Caldas - Juliana Villegas Jimenez
- Cartagena DT y C - Katya Victoria Lopez Velez
- Cesar - Maria Martha Lacouture Maya
- Chocó - Carmen Lizeth Rivas Abadia
- Córdoba - Ana María Burgos Mendoza
- Cundinamarca - Alejandra Milena Aldana Saavedra
- Guajira - Aylen Adeline Borrego Areyanes
- Huila - Natalia Tamayo Palacio
- Magdalena - Laura Maria Abisambra Zuñiga
- Meta - Deyanira Aguirre Barrero
- Norte de Santander - Diana Milena Cepeda Castro
- Quindío - Laura Marcela Fernández Zuluaga
- Risaralda - Juliana Upegui Saldarriaga
- San Andrés and Providencia - Paola Andrea Gallardo Zakzuk
- Santander - Linda Vannesa Consuegra Leal
- Tolima - Maria Julia Quessep Bitar
- Valle - Diana Arbelaez Gonzalez
