= Esto huele mal =

2007 film

- Theatrical release poster
- Directed by: Jorge Ali Triana
- Written by: based on the novel “Esto huele mal” by Fernando Quiroz
- Screenplay by: Jorge Ali Triana; Jorg Hiller
- Produced by: Clara María Ochoa
- Starring: Diego Bertie; Cristina Campuzano; Valerie Domínguez; Diego Cadavid
- Cinematography: Juan Cristobal Cobo
- Edited by: Alberto Ponce
- Music by: Camilo Posada
- Production company: CMO Producciones
- Release date: 3 August 2007
- Running time: 100 minutes
- Country: Colombia

Esto huele mal (English: This smells bad) is a 2007 Colombian drama comedy film directed by Jorge Ali Triana, who also co-wrote the screenplay. The film is based on the eponymous novel written by Fernando Quiroz, who was inspired by real-world events. The plot follows the story of a businessman who lies about being the victim of a terrorist attack to hide his infidelities from his wife.

== Plot ==
Ricardo Caicedo is a well-to-do businessman in Bogotá, who in all appearances has a happy family life. His wife, Elena is devoted to him and the couple have a young son. However, Ricardo has been having an affair with a mistress named Manuela, which started a year ago. One day, in order to be with his mistress, Ricardo pretends to have a business meeting with several Argentinian associates at the Nogal Club. His lie is about to be uncovered when a terrorist placed a bomb at the club where Ricardo was supposed to be. His wife is worried about his safety and calls him. Ricardo is on the other side of town leaving Manuela’s house. To avoid revealing his infidelity Ricardo is determined to prove that he was at the scene of the attack. Aided by his friend Guzman, Ricardo invents an elaborate lie which portrays him as being one of the many victims of the terrorist attack. He is mistaken to be the saviour of a little girl's life and he becomes a hero.

== Cast ==
- Diego Bertie - Ricardo
- Cristina Campuzano - Elena
- Valerie Domínguez - Manuela
- Diego Cadavid – Guzman
- Maria Eugenia Dávila- Elena’s mother
- Naty Botero – Patricia
- Víctor Hugo Morant – Elena’s father
- Sandra Reyes- Journalist

== DVD release ==
Esto huele mal is available on DVD. Audio in Spanish, with English subtitles.
