= Tutu Mosquera =

Miss Colombia 2025, beauty pageant titleholder, Colombian model

- Born: María Antonia Mosquera Carvajal; 8 August 2000 (age 26); Cali, Colombia
- Education: CESA
- Beauty pageant titleholder
- Title: Miss Valle 2025; Miss Colombia 2025
- Major competitions: Miss Colombia 2025; (Winner); Miss International 2026; (TBD)

María Antonia "Tutu" Mosquera Carvajal (born 8 August 2000) is a Colombian model and beauty pageant titleholder who won Miss Colombia 2025. She will represent Colombia at Miss International 2026.

== Early life ==
Mosquera was born on 8 August 2000 in Cali, Valle del Cauca, Colombia. She studied business administration with an emphasis on sustainability at CESA in Bogotá. She complemented her education with a diploma in fashion at the Vogue College of Fashion in Madrid, Spain.

She has worked on projects related to fashion, sustainability, and digital content. In addition, she has cultivated her musical talents from a young age: she plays piano, is learning guitar empirically, and composes her own songs.

== Pageantry ==
=== Miss Valle 2025 ===
Mosquera's career in beauty pageants began in July 2025, when she won Miss Valle for the next edition of the Miss Colombia pageant.

=== Miss Colombia 2025 ===
Mosquera represented the Valle del Cauca Department at the Miss Colombia 2025 pageant. Her win marked the 13th title for her department and the first since Gabriela Tafur in 2018.

=== Miss International 2026 ===
Tutu will represent her country at Miss International 2026 in Tokyo, Japan.

Awards and achievements
Preceded by Catalina Duque	Miss Colombia International; 2026	Incumbent
Preceded by Catalina Duque	Miss Colombia; 2025	Incumbent
Preceded by Valentina Tafur	Miss Valle; 2025	Incumbent
