= Miss Colombia 2005 =

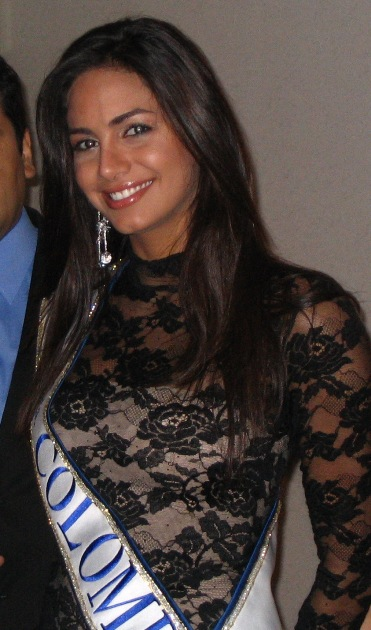
- Date: November 14, 2005
- Presenters: Paola Turbay; Miguel Varoni
- Venue: Centro de Convenciones Cartagena de Indias, Cartagena de Indias, Colombia
- Broadcaster: RCN TV
- Entrants: 22
- Placements: 10
- Winner: Valerie Dominguez Tarud; Atlántico
- Congeniality: Liliana Morales Barrios; Bolívar
- Best National Costume: Ana María Castañeda; Sucre
- Photogenic: Silvana Altanoa López; Meta

Miss Colombia 2005, the 71st Miss Colombia pageant, was held in Cartagena de Indias, Colombia, on November 14, 2005, after three weeks of events. The winner of the pageant was Valerie Dominguez Tarud, Señorita Atlántico.

The pageant was broadcast live on RCN TV from the Centro de Convenciones Julio Cesar Turbay in Cartagena de Indias, Colombia. At the conclusion of the final night of competition, outgoing titleholder Adriana Tarud crowned Valerie Dominguez Tarud of Atlántico as the new Miss Colombia.

== Results ==
=== Placements ===
Placement	Contestant
Miss Colombia 2005	Atlántico – Valerie Dominguez Tarud
1st Runner-Up	Chocó – Karina Guerra Rodriguez
2nd Runner-Up	Bolívar – Liliana Morales Barrios
3rd Runner-Up	Antioquia – Dayana González Tamayo
4th Runner-Up	Sucre – Ana María Castañeda
Top 10	Córdoba – Lissete Barakat Debiase; Huila – Lina Polania Ibagon; Meta – Silvana Altanoa López; San Andrés – Tatiana Peña Guitierrez; Valle – María Alejandra Peña

=== Special awards ===
- Miss Photogenic (voted by press reporters) - Silvana Patricia Altahona López (Meta)
- Best Body Figura Bodytech - Valerie Dominguez Tarud (Atlántico)
- Miss Congeniality - Liliana del Carmen Morales Barrios (Bolivar)
- Best Costume - Ana María Castañeda (Sucre)
- Reina de la Policia - Claudia Margarita González Dangond (Cesar)
- Señorita Puntualidad - Claudia Margarita González Dangond (Cesar)
- Miss Elegance - Karina Guerra Rodriguez (Chocó)

== Delegates ==
The Miss Colombia 2005 delegates are:

- Antioquia - Dayanna María Gonzalez Tamayo
- Atlántico - Valerie Domínguez Tarud
- Bolívar - María del Carmen Morales Barrios
- Cartagena DT y C - María Catalina Garcia Ciodaro
- Cauca - María Virginia Hormaza Garrido
- Cesar - Claudia Margarita González Dangond
- Chocó - Karina Guerra Rodríguez
- Córdoba - Lissete Wadad Barakat Debiase
- Cundinamarca - Astrid Helena Cristancho Palacio
- Guajira - Hagna Milena Fernández Hernández
- Huila - Lina María Polania Ibagon
- Magdalena - Malka Iriña Piña Berdugo
- Meta - Silvana Patricia Altaona López
- Nariño - Monica Caterine Castro Rodríguez
- Norte de Santander - Paola Andrea O'meara Lizcano
- Quindío - Ana Carolina Quintero Jimenez
- San Andrés and Providencia - Tatiana Peña Gutiérrez
- Santander - Paola Andrea Ordoñez Vera
- Sucre - Ana María Castañeda Gómez
- Tolima - Yuliana Cardenas Mejía
- Valle - María Alejandra Peña González
