= Miss Colombia =

National beauty pageant competition in Colombia, beauty pageant organization

Señorita Colombia; Concurso Nacional de Belleza de Colombia
- Formation: 1934; 92 years ago
- Purpose: Beauty pageant
- Headquarters: Cartagena
- Location: Colombia
- Official language: Spanish
- National Director: Raimundo Angulo Pizarro
- Affiliations: Miss Grand International; Miss International; Miss Charm; Reina Hispanoamericana; Miss Mesoamerica
- Website: srtacolombia.org

Miss Colombia (Formally Concurso Nacional de Belleza de Colombia, English: "National Beauty Contest of Colombia") is the national beauty pageant organization in Colombia.

The current Miss Colombia is María Antonia Mosquera of Valle del Cauca, who was crowned on 17 November 2025.

== Pageant rules ==
Colombia has rigid and strict rules regarding participation of any Miss Universe preliminary aspirant: once a contestant registers for the pageant, she is confined to her own Department and cannot move or relocate to other states/provinces. However, she can participate more than once for the same department. As example, the winner of 2003 had already come in fourth place at the Miss Valle pageant the year before she won and eventually went on to win the national title and crown.

Initially, the pageant's winners held the title for six months period; Yolanda Emiliani Roman, Miss Colombia 1934, held her title for the longest reign in the pageant's history. The winner of Señorita Colombia previously represented her country at Miss Universe, but will attend Miss International following a loss of the franchise in 2020. On occasion, when the winner does not qualify (such as due to age) for either contest, a runner-up finalist is selected by the national director and sent.

== Titleholders ==
Year	Señorita Colombia	Department
1934	Yolanda Emiliani†	Bolívar
1947	María Gómez †	Bolívar
1949	Myriam Sojo†	Atlántico
1951	Leonor Navia†	Valle del Cauca
1953	Luz Marina Cruz	Valle del Cauca
1955	Ligia Gallón	Santander
1957	Doris Gil† (Note: resigned Miss Colombia 1957)	Antioquia
1958	Luz Marina Zuluaga; Miss Universe 1958 (Note: replaced Miss Colombia 1957)	Caldas
1959	Stella Márquez; Miss International 1960	Nariño
1961	Sonia Heidman	Bolívar
1962	Martha Restrepo	Atlántico
1963	Leonor Duplat†	Norte de Santander
1964	Martha Calero	Valle del Cauca
1965	Edna Rudd	Tolima
1966	Elsa Garrido	Cauca
1967	Luz Elena Restrepo	Atlántico
1968	Margarita Reyes	Valle del Cauca
1969	María Luisa Riasco	Antioquia
1970	Piedad Mejía	Caldas
1971	María Luisa Lignarolo	Atlántico
1972	Ana Agudelo	Valle del Cauca
1973	Ella Escandón	Santander
1974	Martha Echeverry	Valle del Cauca
1975	María Helena Reyes	Bogotá
1976	Aura Mojica	Valle del Cauca
1977	Shirley Sáenz	Bogotá
1978	Ana Parra	Santander
1979	María Patricia Arbeláez	Antioquia
1980	Nini Soto	Santander
1981	María Teresa Gómez	Antioquia
1982	Julie Sáenz	Bogotá
1983	Susana Caldas	Bolívar
1984	Sandra Eugenia Borda	Bolívar
1985	María Mónica Urbina	La Guajira
1986	María Patricia López	Antioquia
1987	Diana Patricia Arévalo	Santander
1988	María Teresa Egurrola	La Guajira
1989	Lizeth Yamil Mahecha	Atlántico
1990	Maribel Judith Gutiérrez	Atlántico
1991	Paola Turbay	Bogotá
1992	Paula Betancur	Amazonas
1993	Carolina Gómez	Bogotá
1994	Tatiana Castro	Cesar
1995	Lina María Gaviria	Meta
1996	Claudia Elena Vásquez	Antioquia
1997	Silvia Fernanda Ortiz	Santander
1998	Marianella Maal	Atlántico
1999	Catalina Inés Acosta	Cundinamarca
2000	Andrea Nocetti	Cartagena
2001	Vanessa Mendoza	Chocó
2002	Diana Mantilla	Santander
2003	Catherine Daza	Valle del Cauca
2004	Adriana Tarud	Atlántico
2005	Valerie Domínguez	Atlántico
2006	Eileen Roca	Cesar
2007	Taliana Vargas	Magdalena
2008	Michelle Rouillard	Cauca
2009	Natalia Navarro	Bolívar
2010	Catalina Robayo	Valle del Cauca
2011	Daniella Álvarez	Atlántico
2012	Lucia Aldana	Valle del Cauca
2013	Paulina Vega; Miss Universe 2014	Atlántico
2014	Ariadna Gutiérrez	Sucre
2015	Andrea Tovar	Chocó
2016	Laura González	Cartagena
2017	Valeria Morales	Valle del Cauca
2018	Gabriela Tafur	Valle del Cauca
2019	María Fernanda Aristizábal	Quindío
2021	Valentina Espinosa	Bolívar
2022	Sofía Osío	Atlántico
2024	Catalina Duque; Miss International 2025	Antioquia
2025	María Antonia Mosquera	Valle del Cauca

=== Gallery of titleholders ===
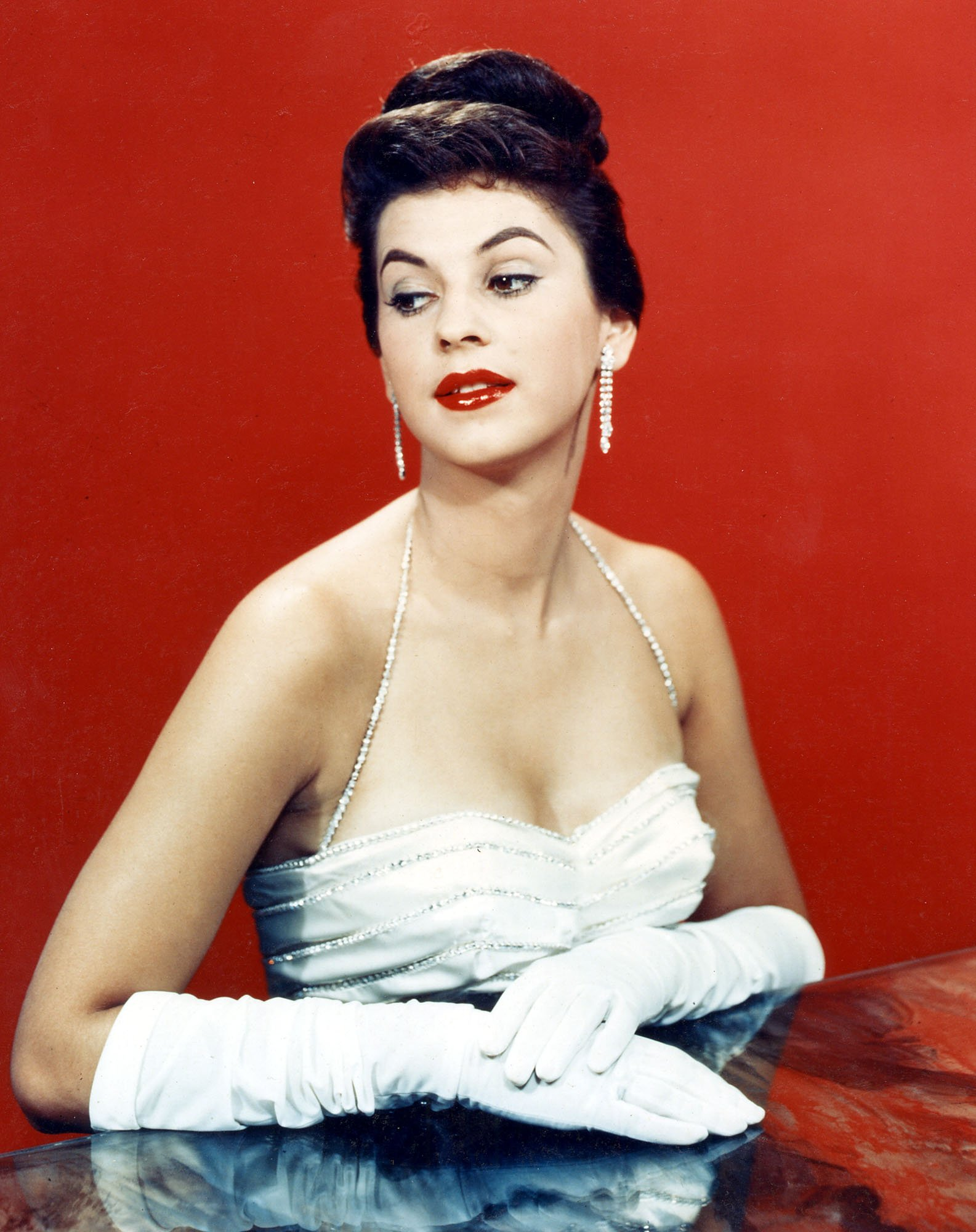
Luz Marina Zuluaga, Miss Colombia 1958

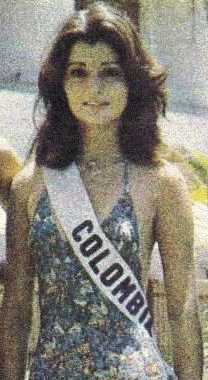
Aura Mojica, Miss Colombia 1977

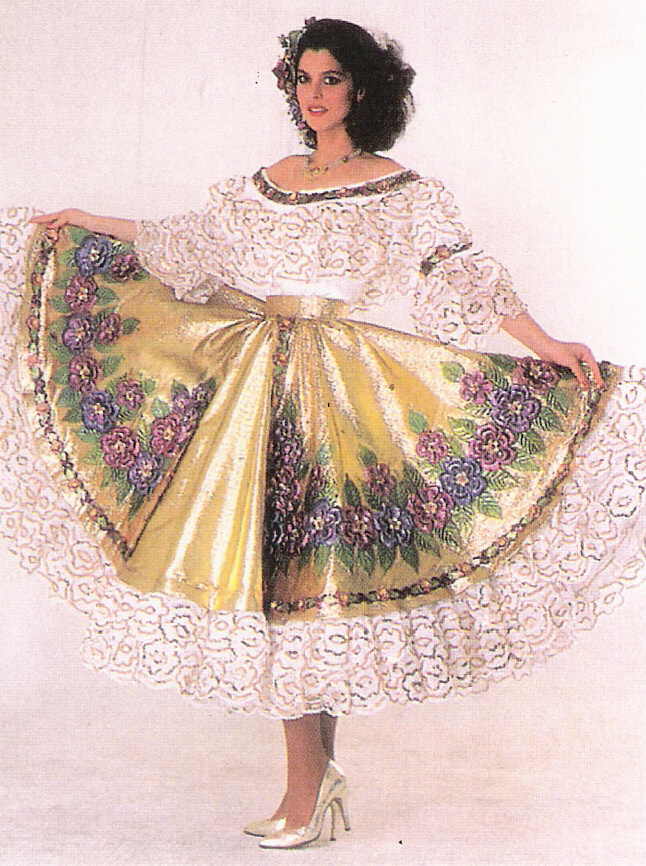
Sandra Borda, Miss Colombia 1984

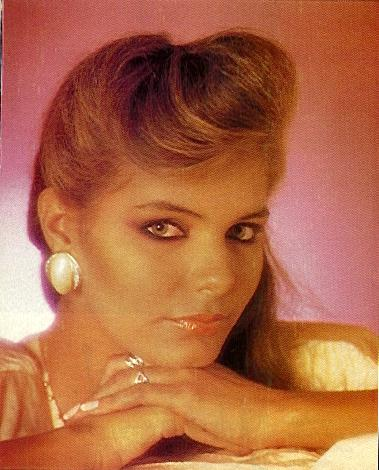
Mónia Urbina, Miss Colombia 1985

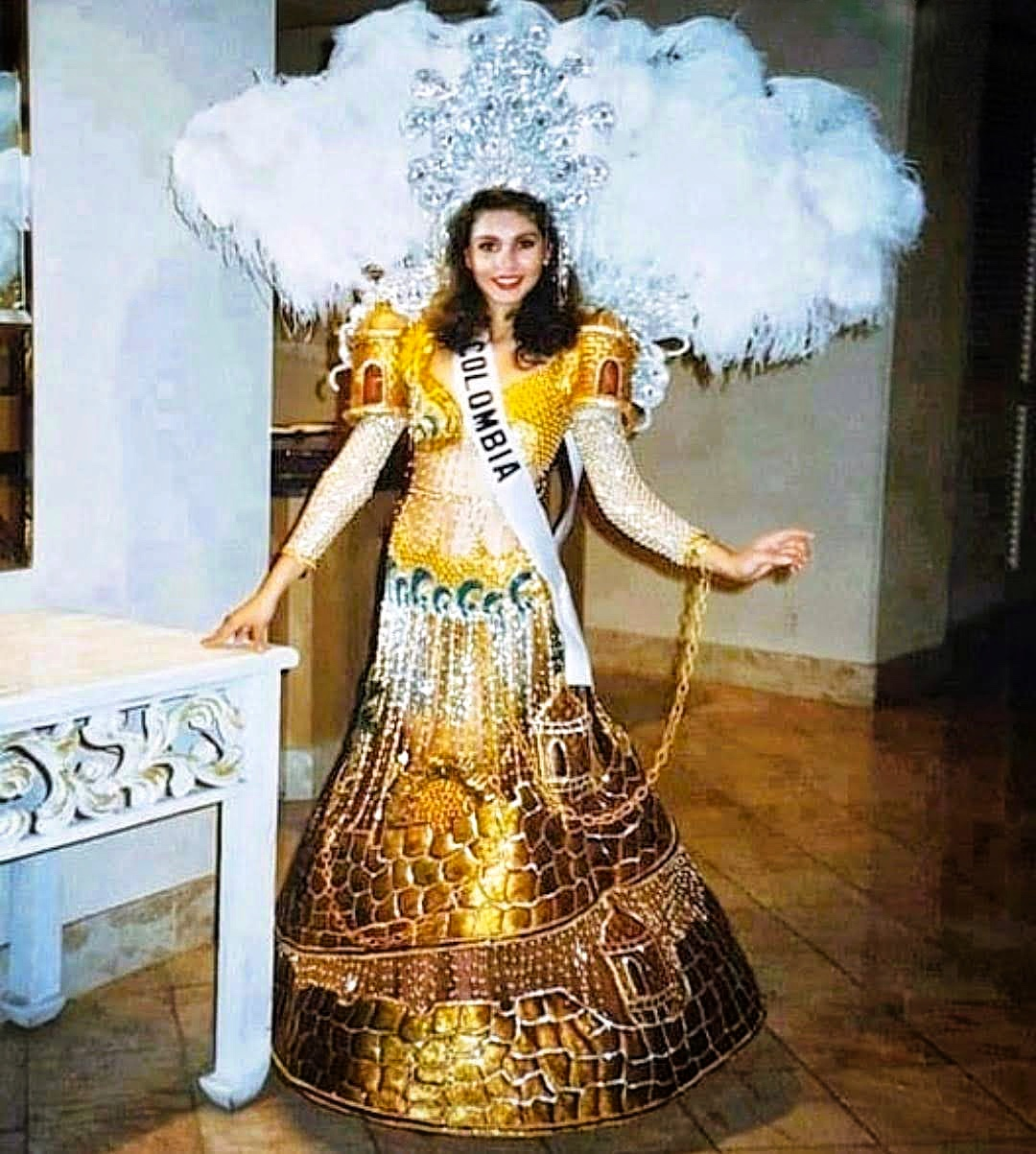
Lizeth Mahecha, Miss Colombia 1989

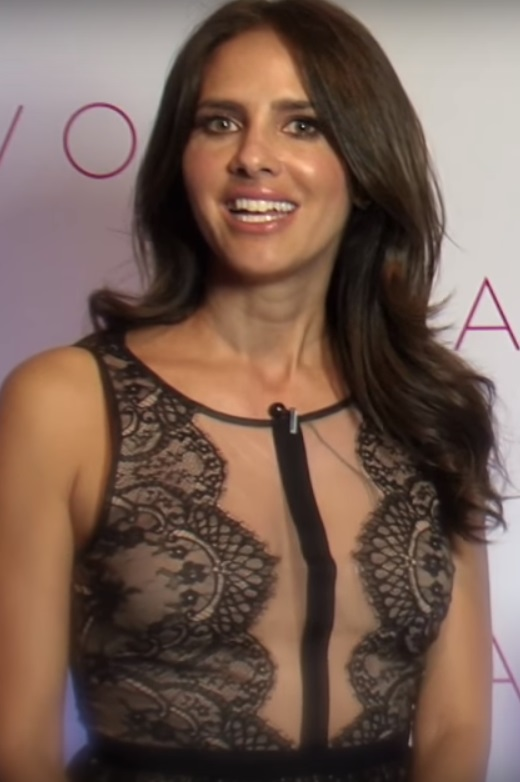
Paola Turbay, Miss Colombia 1991

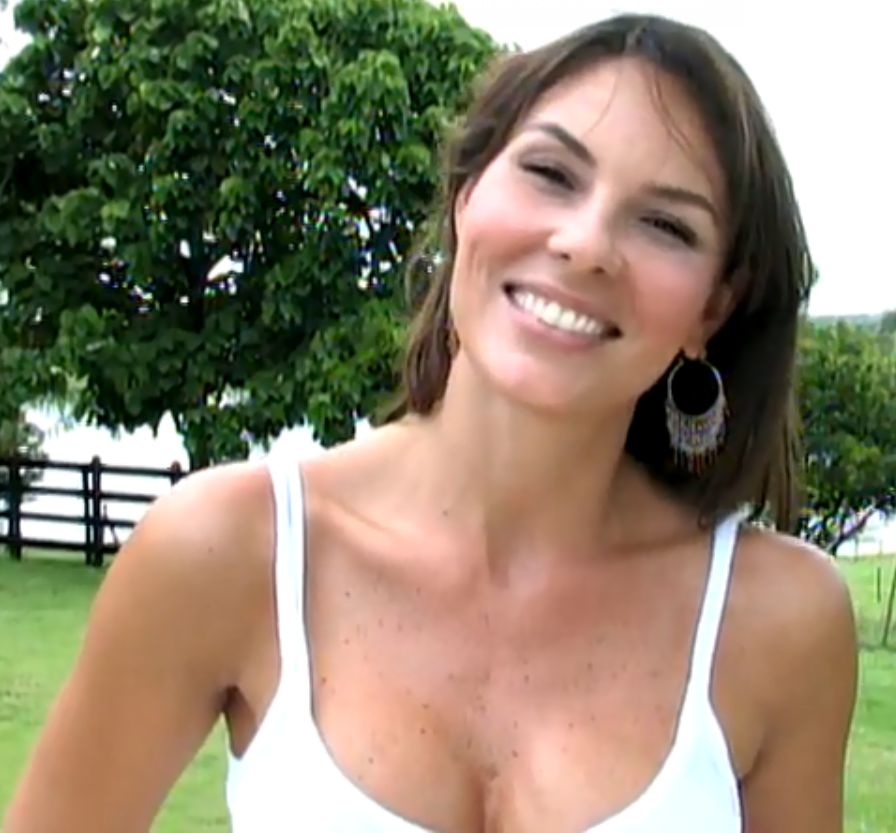
Paula Andrea Betancur, Miss Colombia 1992

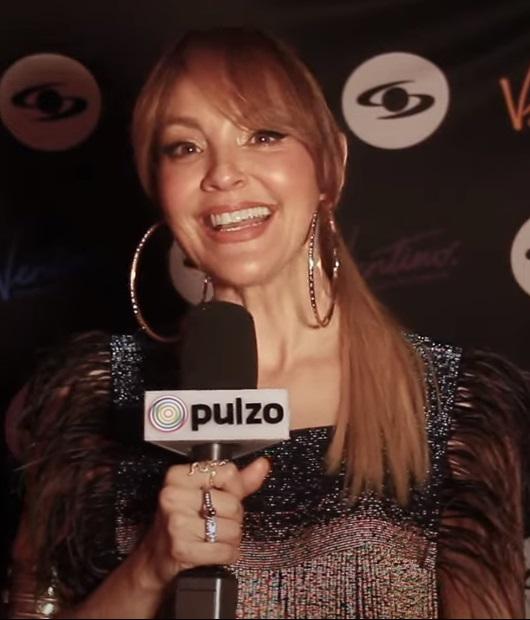
Carolina Gómez, Miss Colombia 1993

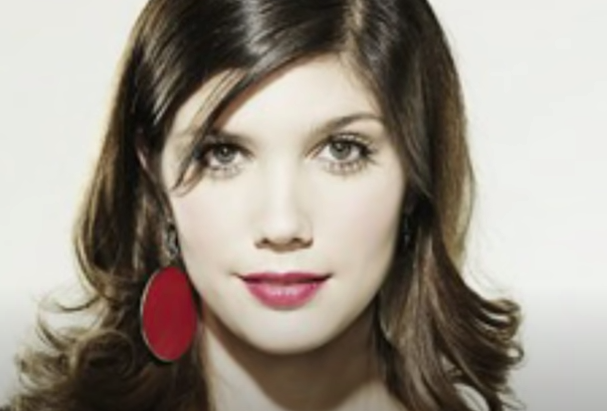
Andrea Nocetti, Miss Colombia 2000

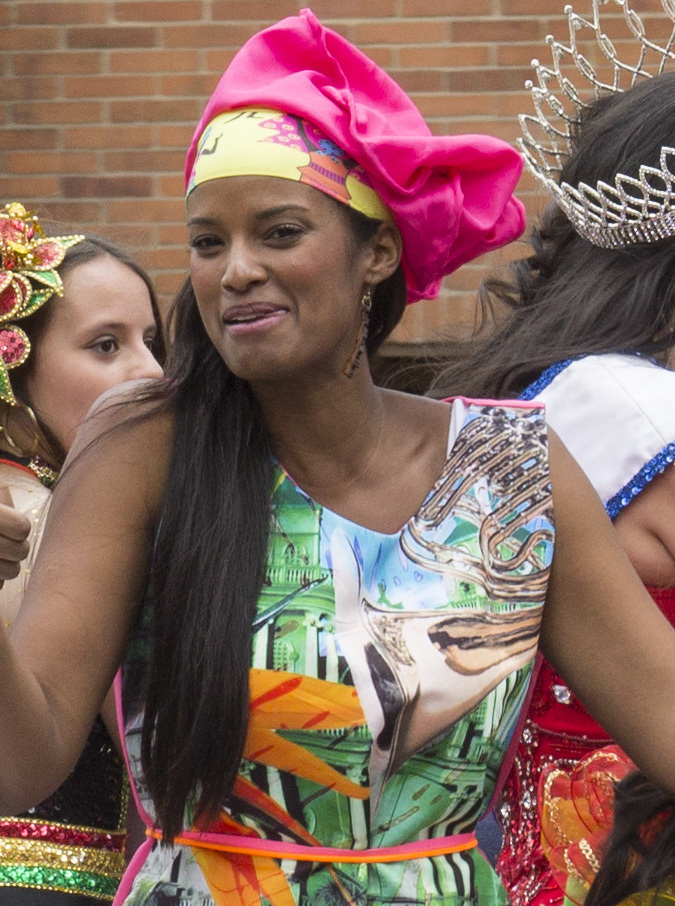
Vanessa Mendoza, Miss Colombia 2001

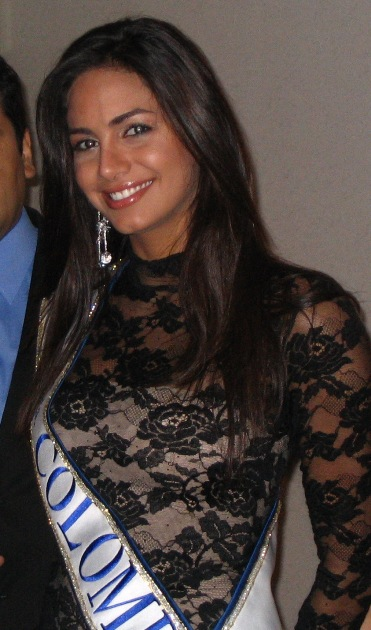
Valerie Domínguez, Miss Colombia 2005

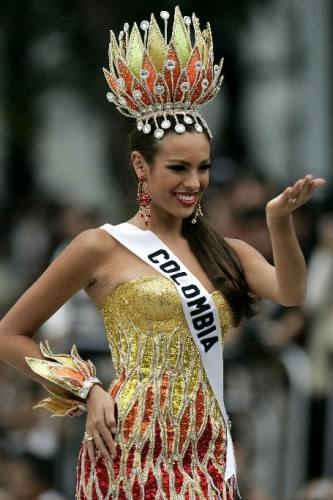
Eileen Roca, Miss Colombia 2006

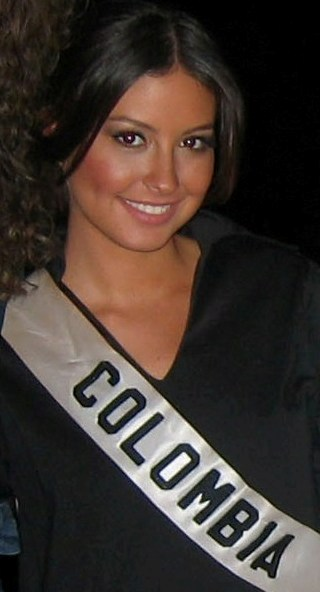
Taliana Vargas, Miss Colombia 2007

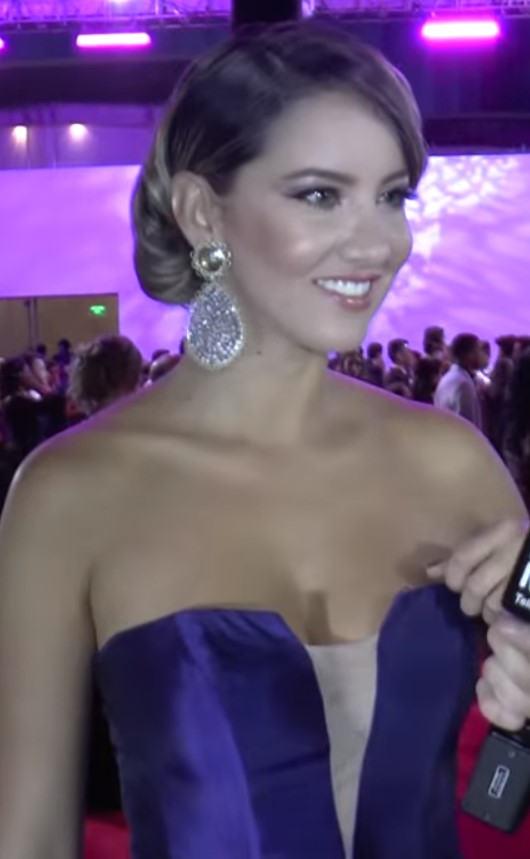
Daniela Álvarez, Miss Colombia 2011

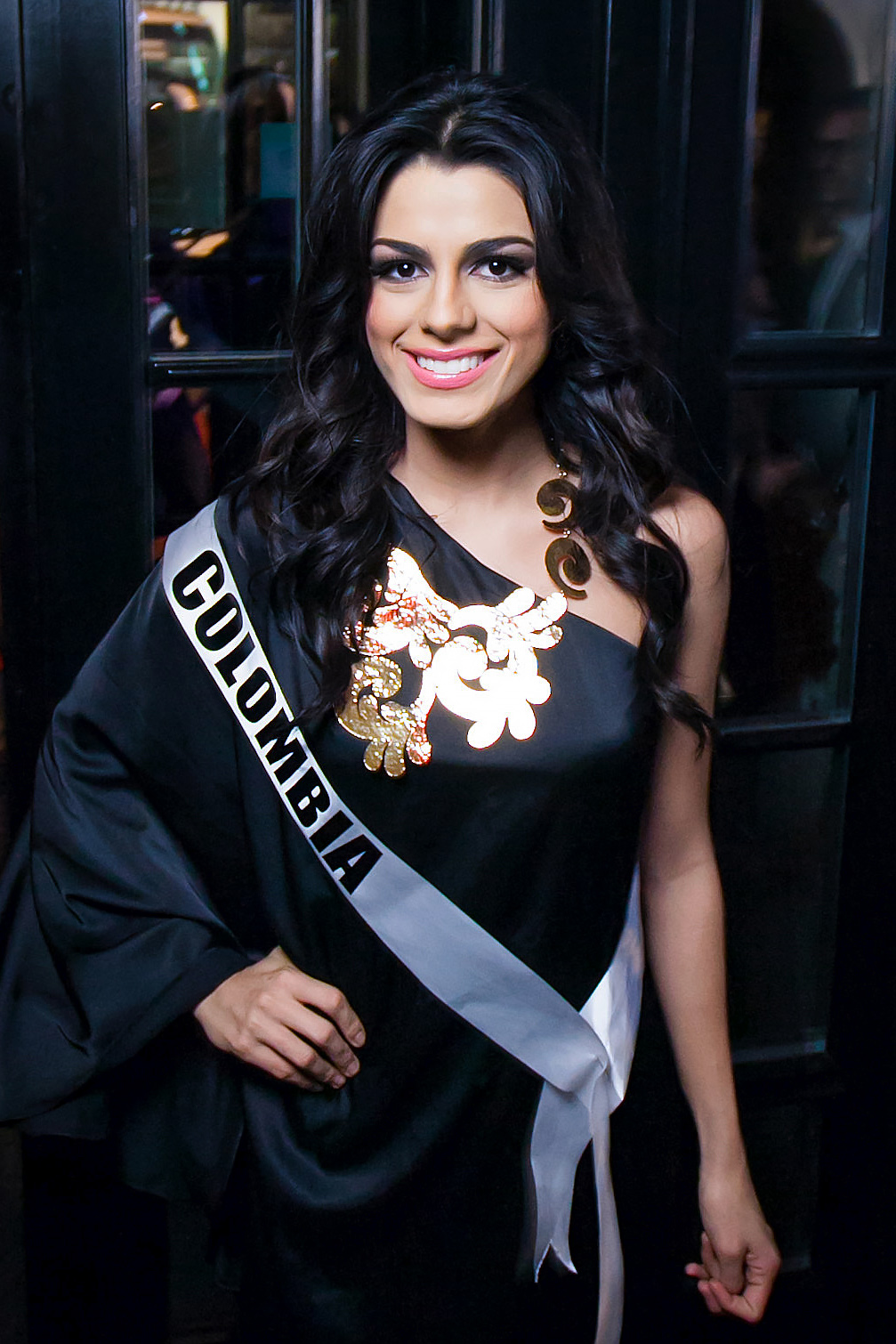
Lucia Aldana, Miss Colombia 2012

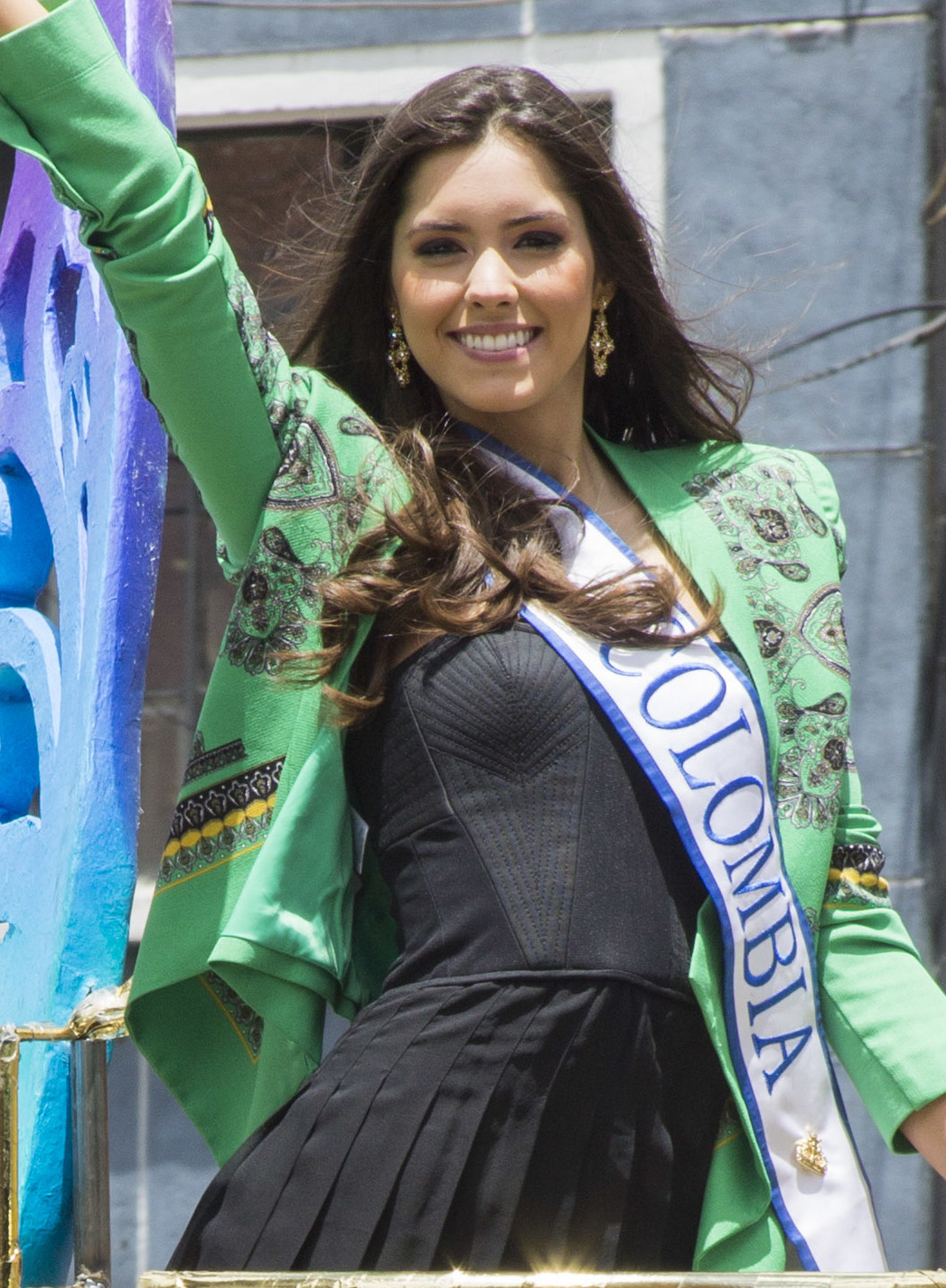
Paulina Vega, Miss Colombia 2013

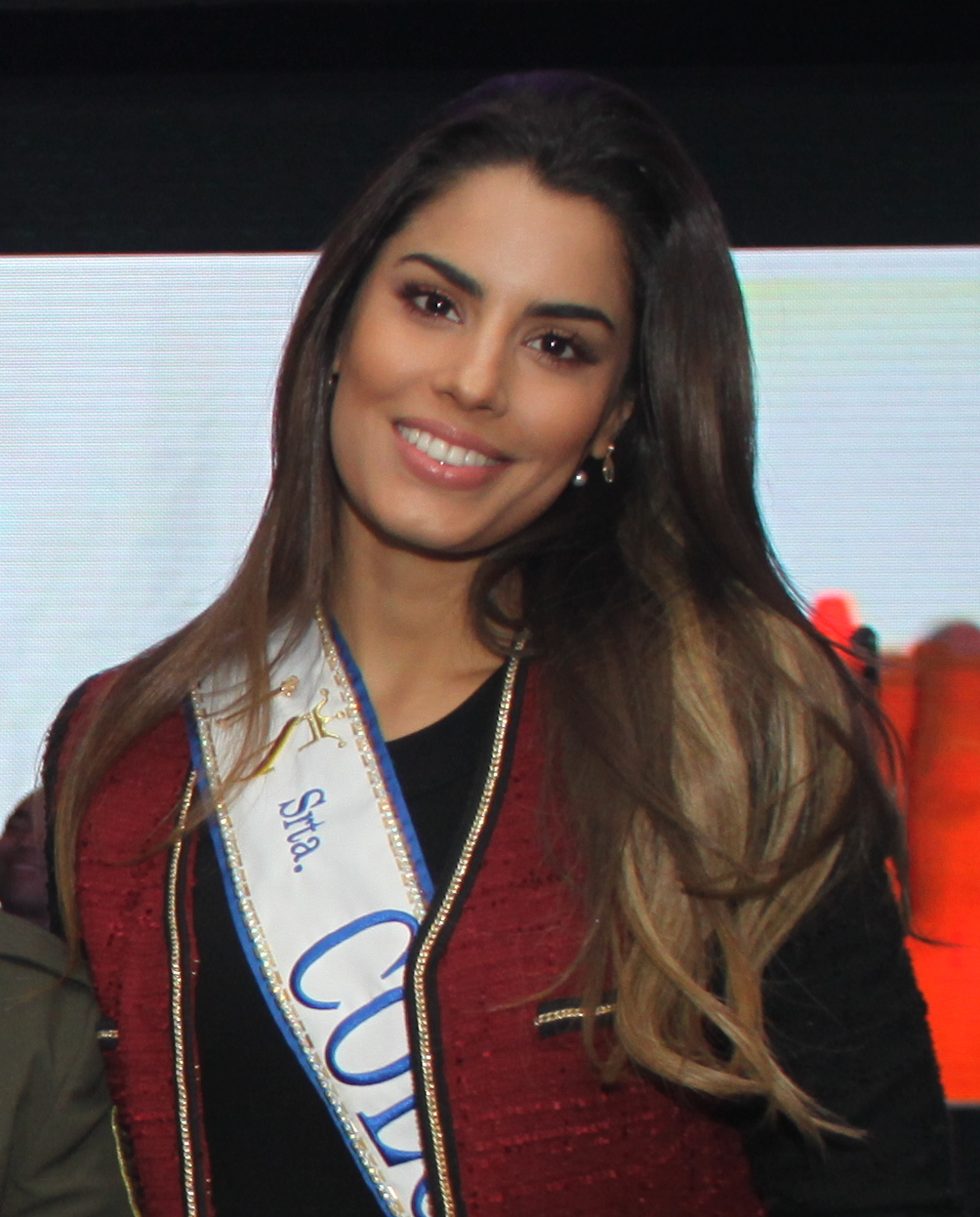
Ariadna Gutiérrez, Miss Colombia 2014

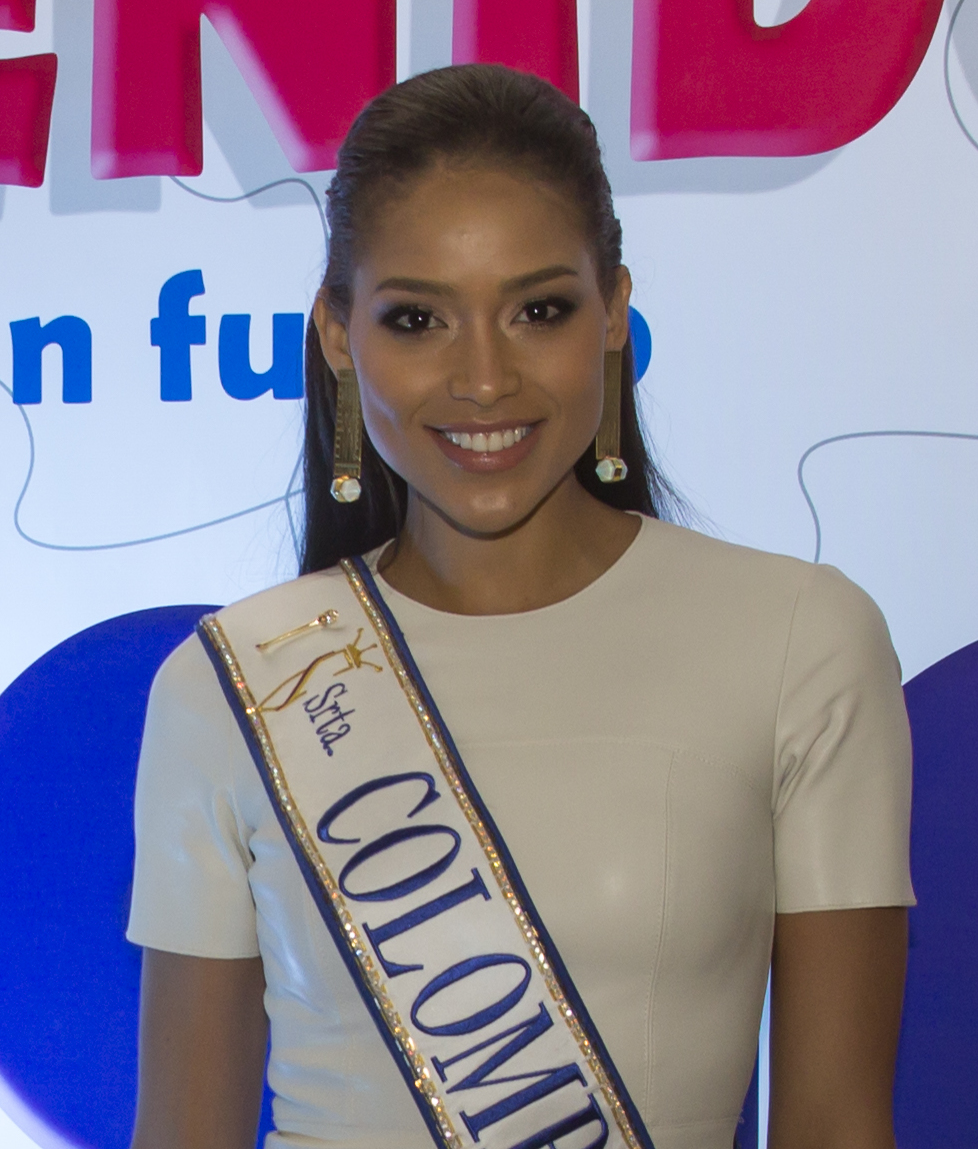
Andrea Tovar, Miss Colombia 2015

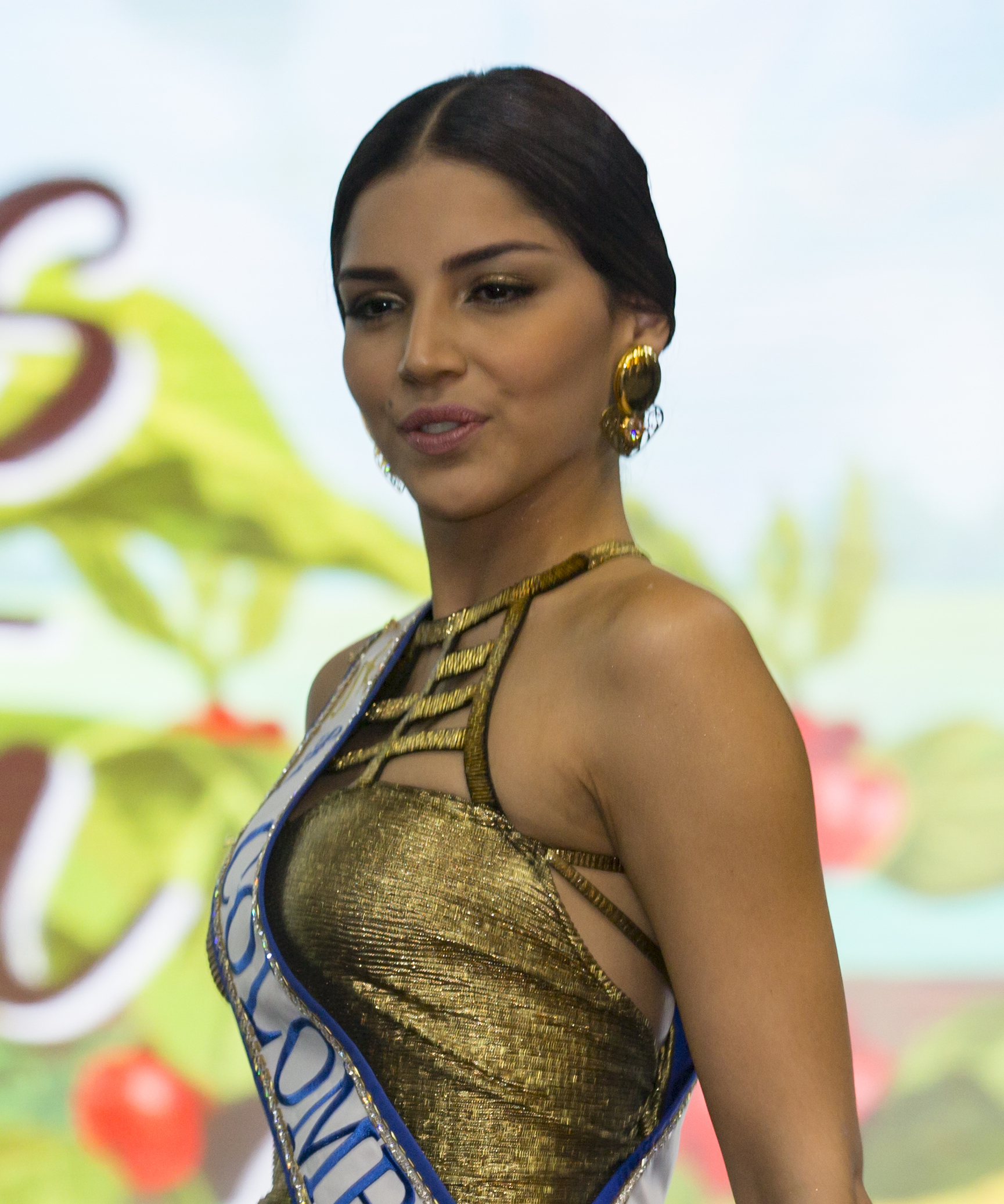
Laura González, Miss Colombia 2017

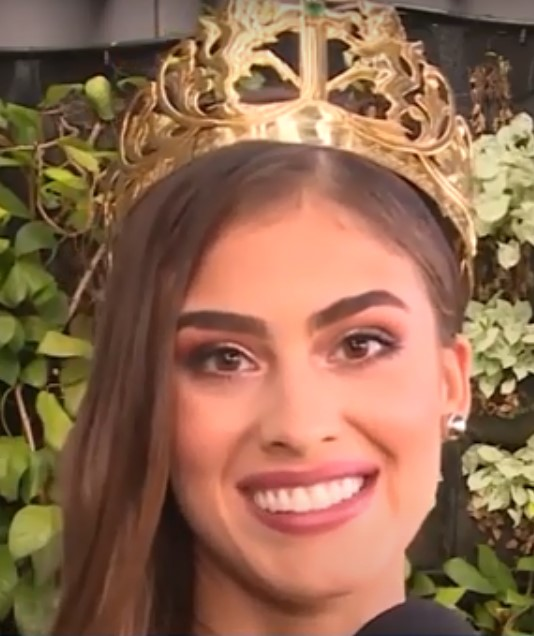
Valentina Morales, Miss Universe Colombia 2018

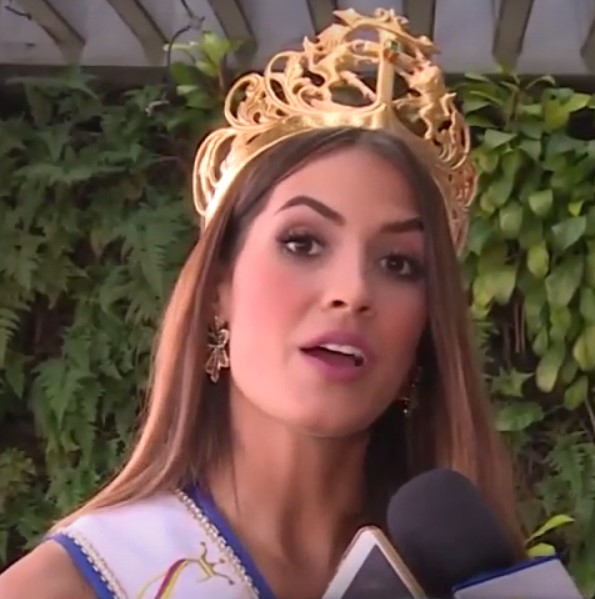
Gabriela Tafur, Miss Colombia 2018

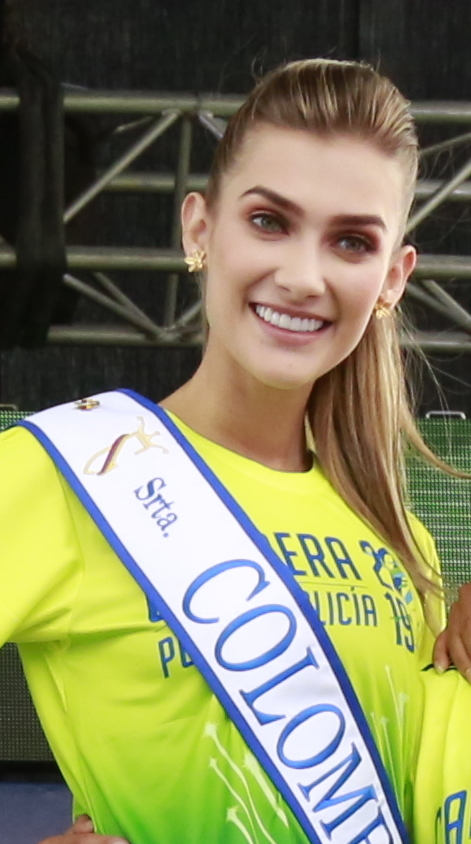
Maria Fernanda Aristizábal, Miss Colombia 2019-2020

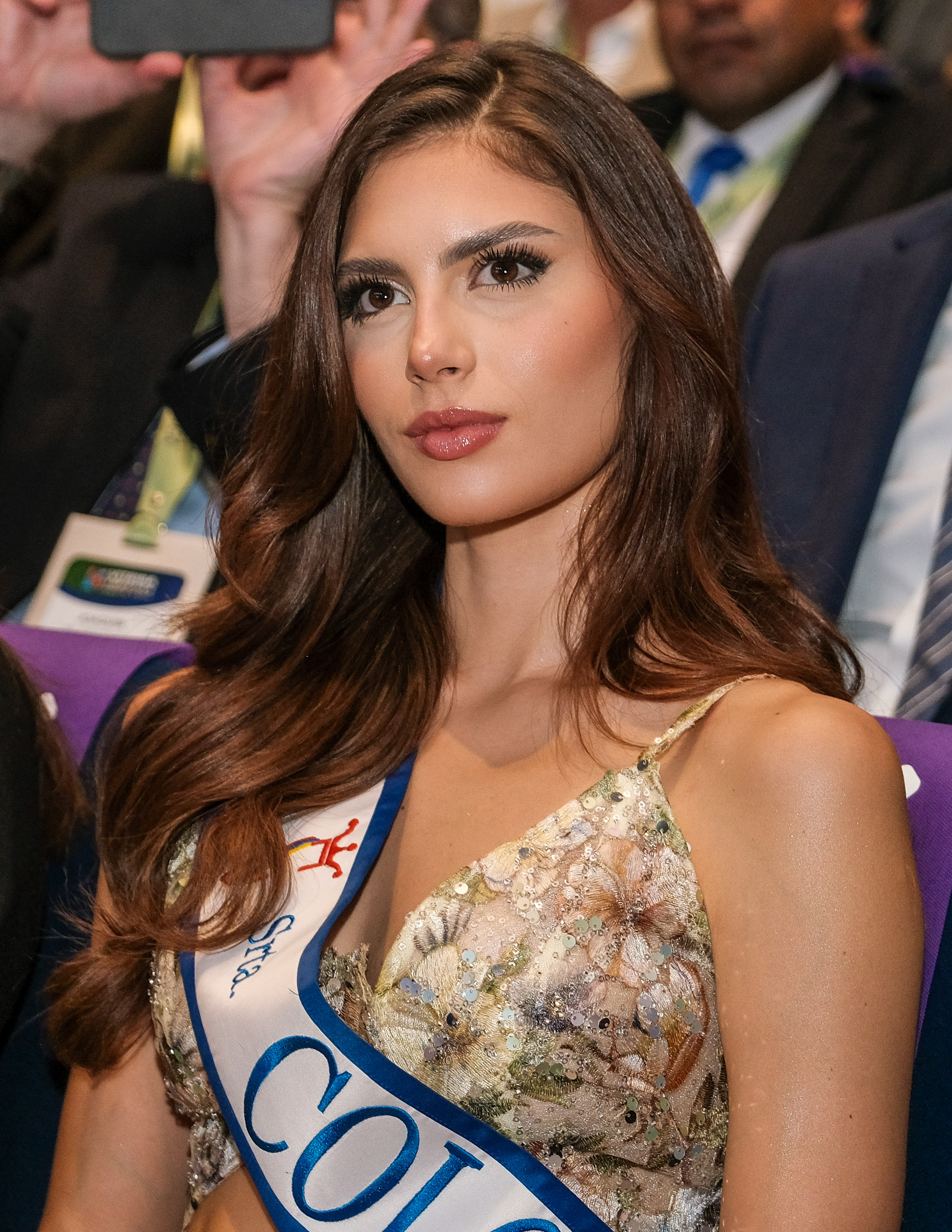
Sofía Osío Luna, Miss Colombia 2022-2023

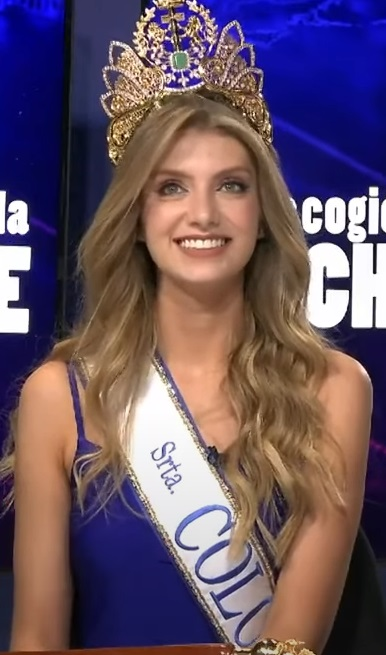
Catalina Duque Abréu, Miss Colombia 2024-2025

== International crowns ==
- Two – Miss Universe winners:
  - Luz Marina Zuluaga (1958)
  - Paulina Vega (2014)
- Four – Miss International winners:
  - Stella Marquez (1960)
  - Paulina Gálvez (1999)
  - Jeymmy Vargas (2004)
  - Catalina Duque Abréu (2025)

== Colombia representatives at International pageants ==
The following women have represented Colombia in the international pageants.

=== Señorita Colombia – Internacional ===
Year	Miss International Colombia	Placement	Special Award(s)
2026	María Antonia Mosquera	TBA	
2025	Catalina Duque Abréu	Miss International 2025	
2024	Juanita Urrea Posada	Unplaced	
2023	Sofía Osío Luna	1st Runner-Up	
2022	Natalia López Cardona	3rd Runner-Up	
Due to the impact of COVID-19 pandemic, no pageant in 2020 and 2021
2019	Maria Alejandra Vengoechea	3rd Runner-Up	
2018	Anabella Castro Sierra	4th Runner-Up	
2017	Vanessa Pulgarin Monsalve	Unplaced	
2016	Yudy Daniela Herrera Avendaño	Unplaced	
2015	Natalia Ochoa Calle	Unplaced	
2014	Zuleika Suárez	1st Runner-Up	Miss Friendship; Miss Best Dresser
2013	Cindy Lorena Hermída Aguilar	4th Runner-Up	
2012	Melissa Varón	Top 15	
2011	Natalia Valenzuela Cutiva	Unplaced	
2010	Leydi Viviana Gómez Cortés	Unplaced	
2009	Lina Marcela Mosquera Ochoa	Unplaced	
2008	Maria Cristina Diaz-Granados	1st Runner-Up	
2007	Ana Milena Lamus Rodríguez	Unplaced	
2006	Karina Guerra Rodríguez	Top 12	
2005	Diana Arbeláez González	Top 15	
2004	Jeymmy Paola Vargas Gómez	Miss International 2004	
2003	Isabel Sofia Cabrales Baquero	Unplaced	
2002	Consuelo Guzman Parra	Unplaced	
2001	Maria Rocio Stevenson Covo	Top 15	
2000	Carolina Cruz Osorio	Top 15	
1999	Paulina Margarita Gálvez Pineda	Miss International 1999	Miss Photogenic
1998	Adriana Hurtado Novella	Top 15	Best National Costume
1997	Ingrid Catherine Náder Haupt	Top 15	
1996	Claudia Inés de Torcoroma Mendoza Lemus	2nd Runner-Up	Best National Costume
1995	Iovana Soraya Grisales Castañeda	Top 15	
1994	Alexandra Betancur Marín	Top 15	
1993	Kathy Sáenz Herrera	Top 15	Best National Costume
1992	Lina Maria Marin Díaz	Top 15	Best National Costume
1991	Mónica Maria Escobar Freydell	Top 15	
1990	Elsa Victoria Rivera Botero	Unplaced	
1989	Clelia Alexandra Ablanque Moreno	Unplaced	
1988	Adriana Maria Escobar Mejía	Top 15	
1987	Michelle Betancourt Vergara	Unplaced	Miss Friendship
1986	Maria del Carmen Zapata Valencia	Top 15	
1985	Maria Pia Duque Rengifo	Top 15	Miss Photogenic; Best National Costume
1984	Silvia Maritza Yunda Charry	Unplaced	
1983	Marta Liliana Ruiz Orduz	Top 15	
1982	Adriana Rumié Gomes-Cásseres	Top 15	
1981	Victoria Eugenia Cárdenas Gerlein	Top 15	
1980	Ana Maria Uribe Giraldo	Unplaced	
1979	Ivonne Margarita Guerra de la Espriella	Unplaced	
1978	Olga Lucia Prada Rodríguez	Unplaced	
1977	Silvia Alicia Pombo Carrillo	Unplaced	
1976	Alicia Sáenz Madrid	Top 15	
1975	Alina Maria Botero López	Top 15	
1974	Beatriz del Carmen Cajiao Velasco	Top 15	
1973	Tulia Inés Gómez Porras	Top 15	
1972	Lamia El Kouri Chaia	Top 15	
1971	Patricia Escobar Rodríguez	Top 15	
1970	Did not compete		
1969	Laura Fabiola Pimiento Barrera	Unplaced	
1968	Rosario Barraza Villa	Top 15	Best National Costume
1967	Marta Lucia Guzmán Perdomo	Unplaced	
1966	No contest		
1965	Regina Salcedo Herrera	Unplaced	
1964	Leonor Duplat Sanjuán	Unplaced	
1963	Martha Ligia Restrepo González	Top 15	
1962	Sonia Heidman Gómez	Unplaced	
1961	Vilma Kohlgruber Duque	Unplaced	
1960	Maria Stella Márquez Zawadsky de Araneta	Miss International 1960	

=== Señorita Colombia – Charm International ===
Year	Miss Charm Colombia	Placement	Special Award(s)
2026	Valentina Olano Wightman	TBA	
2025	María José Chacón Montaño	Top 12	
2024	Vanesa Velásquez	Top 6	
2023	Juliana Habib Lorduy	Top 6	

== Past franchises ==
=== Señorita Colombia – Universo ===
Main article: Miss Universe Colombia

The winner of Señorita Colombia represents her country at Miss Universe. On occasion, when the winner does not qualify (due to age) for either contest, a runner-up is sent. Since 2020, the election of Miss Universe Colombia took over the franchise of Miss Universe in Colombia.

Year	Señorita Colombia	Placement	Special Award(s)
2019	Gabriela Tafur Náder	Top 5	
2018	Valeria Morales Delgado	Unplaced	
2017	Laura González	1st Runner-up	
2016	Andrea Tovar	2nd Runner-up	
2015	Ariadna Gutiérrez	1st Runner-up	
2014	Paulina Vega	Miss Universe 2014	
2013	Lucia Aldana	Unplaced	
2012	Daniella Álvarez	Unplaced	
2011	Catalina Robayo	Top 16	
2010	Natalia Navarro	12th	
2009	Michelle Rouillard	Unplaced	
2008	Taliana Vargas	1st Runner-up	
2007	Eileen Roca Torralvo	Unplaced	
2006	Valerie Domínguez Tarud	Top 10	
2005	Adriana Cecilia Tarud Durán	Unplaced	
2004	Catherine Daza Manchola	Top 10	
2003	Diana Lucia Mantilla Prada	Unplaced	
2002	Vanessa Alexandra Mendoza Bustos	Unplaced	Best National Costume
2001	Andrea Nocetti	Unplaced	
2000	Catalina Inés Acosta Albarracín	6th	
1999	Marianella Maal Pacini	Unplaced	
1998	Silvia Fernanda Ortiz Guerra	5th	
1997	Claudia Elena Vásquez	Unplaced	Best National Costume
1996	Lina Maria Gaviria Forero	Unplaced	
1995	Tatiana Leonor Castro Abuchaibe	Top 10	
1994	Carolina Gomez Correa	1st Runner-up	
1993	Paula Andrea Betancur	1st Runner-up	
1992	Paola Turbay	1st Runner-up	
1991	Maribel Judith Gutiérrez Tinoco	Unplaced	Best National Costume
1990	Lizeth Yamile Mahecha Arévalo	2nd Runner-up	Best National Costume
1989	Maria Teresa Egurrola Hinojosa	Unplaced	
1988	Diana Patricia Arévalo Guerra	Top 10	
1987	Maria Patricia López Ruiz	Unplaced	Miss Photogenic
1986	Maria Mónica Urbina Pugliesse	2nd Runner-up	
1985	Sandra Eugenia Borda Caldas	Unplaced	Best National Costume
1984	Susana Caldas Lemaitre	4th Runner-up	
1983	Julie Pauline Sáenz Starnes	Unplaced	
1982	Nadya Santacruz Quintero	Unplaced	
1981	Ana Edilma Cano Puerta	Unplaced	
1980	Maria Patricia Arbeláez Peláez	10th	
1979	Ana Milena Parra Turbay	Unplaced	
1978	Mary Shirley Sáenz Starnes	3rd Runner-up	
1977	Aura Maria Mojica Salcedo	3rd Runner-up	
1976	Maria Helena Reyes Abisambra	Top 12	
1975	Marta Lucía Echeverri Trujillo	Top 12	Miss Photogenic
1974	Ella Cecilia Escandón Palacios	3rd Runner-up	
1973	Ana Lucía Agudelo Correa	Top 12	
1972	Maria Luisa Lignarolo Martínez-Aparicio	Unplaced	
1971	Piedad Mejía Trujillo	Unplaced	
1970	Maria Luisa Riascos Velásquez	Unplaced	
1969	Margarita Maria Reyes Zawadsky	Top 15	Best in Swimsuit
1968	Luz Elena Restrepo González	Unplaced	Best National Costume
1967	Elsa Maria Garrido Cajiao	Unplaced	
1966	Edna Margarita Rudd Lucena	Top 15	
1965	Maria Victoria Ocampo Gómez	Top 15	
1964	Alba Virginia Ramírez Plaza	Unplaced	
1963	Maria Cristina Alvarez González	Top 15	
1962	Olga Lucia Botero Orozco	Top 15	
1961	Patricia Whitman Owen	Unplaced	
1960	Stella Araneta	Top 15	
1959	Olga Beatriz Pumarejo Korkor	Top 15	
1958	Luz Marina Zuluaga †	Miss Universe 1958	

=== Señorita Colombia – Mundo ===
From 1968 to 1990, the National Beauty Contest of Colombia organization were the license holders, and the Colombian representative to Miss World. Began 1991 the election of Miss Mundo Colombia organization took over the franchise of Miss World in Colombia.

Year	Miss World Colombia	Placement	Special Award(s)
1991	Adriana Rodriguez Anzola	Unplaced	
1990	Ángela Mercedes Mariño Ortiz	Unplaced	
1989	Mónica María Isaza Mejía	2nd Runner-up	
1988	Jazmín Oliveros Segura	Unplaced	
1987	Claudia Mercedes Escobar Zapata	4th Runner-up	
1986	Karen Sue Wightman Corredor	Top 15	
1985	Margarita Rosa de Francisco Baquero	Unplaced	
1984	Patricia Janiot	Top 15	
1983	Rocío Isabel Luna Flórez	1st Runner-up	Miss World Americas
1982	María Teresa Gómez Fajardo	Unplaced	
1981	Nini Johanna Soto González	1st Runner-up	
1980	María Cristina Valencia Cardona	Unplaced	
1979	Rosaura Mercedes Rodríguez Covo	Unplaced	
1978	Denise de Castro Santiago	Unplaced	
1977	María Clara O'Byrne Aycardi	Unplaced	
1976	María Loretta Celedón Holguín	Unplaced	
1975	Amanda Amaya Correa	Unplaced	
1974	Luz Maria Osorio Fernández	Unplaced	
1973	Elsa María Springtube Ramírez	Unplaced	
Did not compete between 1971—1972
1970	Carmelina Bayona Vera	Unplaced	
1969	Lina Maria Garcia Ogliastri	Unplaced	
1968	Beatriz Eutiquia Sierra Gonzalez	3rd Runner-up	
1967	Did not compete		
1966	María Estelia Sáenz Calero	Withdrew	
1965	Nubia Angelina Bustillo Gallo	Unplaced	
1964	Paulina Vargas Gilede	Unplaced	
1963	Maria Eugenia Cucalón Venegas	Top 14	

=== Señorita Colombia – Supranacional ===
From 2010 to 2016 the Miss Earth Colombia organization were the license holders, and the Colombian representative to Miss Supranational. In 2017, Señorita Colombia was in charge of selecting the Colombian representative for Miss Supranational until 2023. In 2022, The winner of Señorita Colombia represents her country at Miss Supranational.

Year	Miss Supranational Colombia	Placement	Special Award(s)
2023	Valentina Mora Trujillo	Top 24	Supra Model of the Americas
2022	Valentina Espinosa Guzmán	Top 12	Miss Supranational Americas; Supra Model of the Americas
2021	Valentina Aldana Dorado	Unplaced	
2019	Yaiselle Tous Tejada	Top 10	Supra Model of the Americas
2018	Miriam Isabel Carranza de Moya	Top 25	
2017	Martha Luz "Tica" Martínez Insignares	1st Runner-up	

=== Señorita Colombia – Grand International ===
Main article: Miss Grand Colombia

Year	Miss Grand International Colombia	Placement	Special Award(s)
2026	María Paula Berrio Díaz	Unplaced	
2021	Mariana Jaramillo Córdoba	Top 20	
2018	Sheyla Quizena	Unplaced	

== Controversies ==
=== David Letterman on Miss Colombia ===
In May 2001, David Letterman joked about the 'special talent' which the then-reigning Miss Colombia Andrea Noceti possessed – that she was able to "swallow 50 balloons full of heroin" for the (non-existent) talent competition in the Miss Universe 2001 pageant. The remark not only infuriated the beauty queen, but also the people in Colombia.

Miss Colombia openly threatened to sue Letterman but later withdrawn the statement after Letterman formally apologised to her in the Late Show with David Letterman about the quip made. Letterman had invited the beauty queen to appear on his show as a gesture of appeasement.

== Sponsors ==
Some of the Miss Colombia Beauty Contest include jewelries like Joyeria Casareo and André Laurent Joyeria, media companies like RCN TV and Cromos Magazine and beauty companies like Jolie de Vogue and Leonisa.

== See also ==
- Miss International
- Miss Supranational
- Miss Charm
- Reina Hispanoamericana
- Reina Mundial del Banano
- Miss Universe Colombia
- Miss Mundo Colombia
- Miss Grand Colombia
- Miss Earth Colombia
