= Natalia Navarro =

Colombian beauty pageant titleholder (born 1987)

- Born: Natalia Navarro Galvis; August 12, 1987 (age 39); Barranquilla, Atlántico, Colombia
- Height: 1.79 m (5 ft 10 1/2 in)
- Beauty pageant titleholder
- Title: Miss Bolívar 2009; Miss Colombia 2009
- Hair color: Brown
- Eye color: Hazel
- Major competitions: Miss Colombia 2009 (Winner); Miss Universe 2010 (Top 15)

Natalia Navarro Galvis (born August 12, 1987 in Barranquilla) is a Colombian model and beauty pageant titleholder who was crowned Señorita Colombia 2009 and placed in the Top 15 at Miss Universe 2010.

== Early life ==
Born in Barranquilla to parents Fuad Navarro and María Cecilia Galvis, Navarro is pursuing a bachelor's degree in finance at Florida International University in Miami and speaks English, Spanish and some French.

== Señorita Colombia 2009 ==
Navarro, who stands 1.79 m (5 ft 10 1/2 in) tall, competed as the representative of Bolívar, one of 24 finalists in her country's national beauty pageant, Señorita Colombia 2009, broadcast live from Cartagena de Indias on November 16, 2009, where she obtained the Best Figure, Best Face and Miss Photogenic awards.

During the competition, Navarro placed first in swimsuit and evening gown, which allowed her to advance as one of the Top 5 finalists, eventually winning the national crown and the right to represent Colombia in Miss Universe 2010.

== Miss Universe 2010 ==
At the 2010 Miss Universe pageant, which was broadcast live from Las Vegas, Nevada on August 23, 2010, Navarro became one of the Top 15 semifinalists and the only South American contestant in the final, placing 12th overall.

Awards and achievements
Preceded by Michelle Rouillard	Miss Colombia; 2009	Succeeded by Catalina Robayo
Preceded by Karen Bray	Miss Bolívar; 2009	Succeeded by Tatiana Najera
