= Valerie Domínguez =

Colombian actress, model, and designer (born 1981)

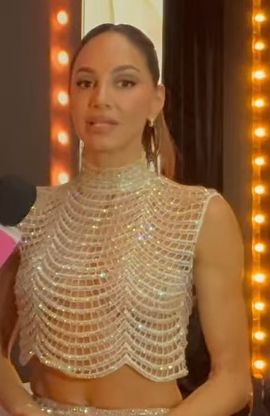
- Born: Valerie Domínguez Tarud; January 12, 1981 (age 45); Barranquilla, Atlántico, Colombia
- Height: 5 ft 9 in (1.75 m)
- Beauty pageant titleholder
- Title: Miss Atlántico 2005; Miss Colombia 2005
- Hair color: Golden brown
- Eye color: Brown
- Major competitions: Miss Colombia 2005 (Winner); Miss Universe 2006 (Top 10)

Valerie Domínguez Tarud (born January 12, 1981) is a Colombian actress, model, designer, and beauty pageant titleholder who was crowned Miss Colombia 2005 and represented her country at Miss Universe 2006 where she finished in the Top 10.

== Early life ==
She also studied fashion design in Milan, Italy and is a jewelry designer in Colombia.

== Pageantry ==
Dominguez competed at Miss Colombia 2005 where she won and gained the right to represent Colombia at and competed at Miss Universe 2006 in Los Angeles. Domínguez finished in the Top 10.

== Career ==
Valerie is also widely recognized due to her television appearances, and made her debut as Marianne Sajir in "Hasta que la plata nos separe". She also started to enter the Colombian film industry, in the role of Manuela for the film "Esto huele mal" by Jorge Ali Triana. She was part of the cast in the television drama El Último Matrimonio Feliz. Valerie has a jewelry store in Barranquilla, which exhibits her designs. She will soon open another store in Bogotá.

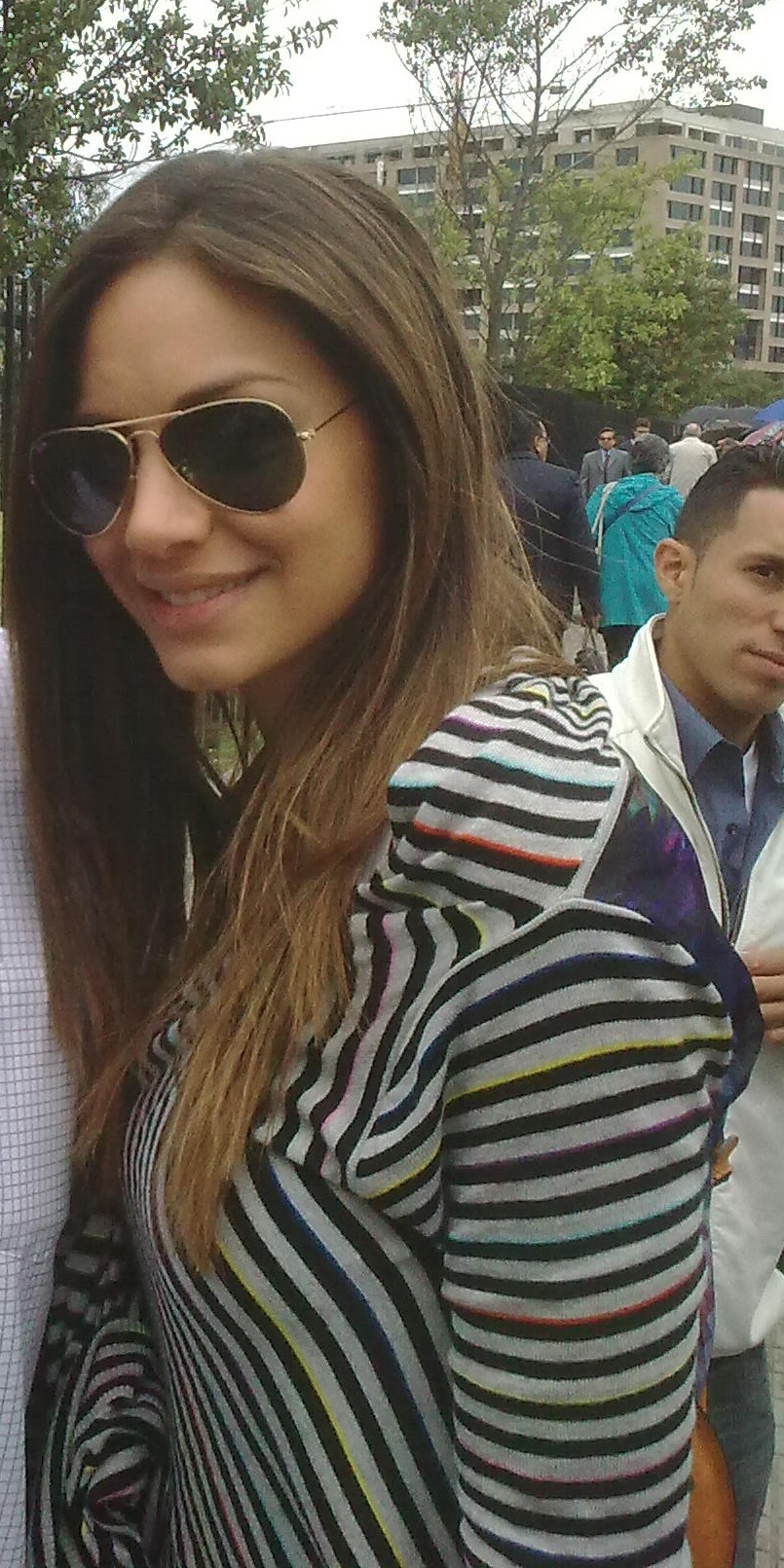
Valerie Domínguez outside the US embassy

=== Telenovelas ===
After participating in the Miss Universe she entered the world of television with the co-starring role in the Colombian telenovela "El último matrimonio feliz" ("The last happy marriage") and had a supporting role in the telenovela "Hasta que la plata nos separe" ("Until the money do us part"), both on RCN television. Besides this, she had her first film appearance Manuela performing the role in the movie called "Esto huele mal" by Jorge Alí Triana.

Then she starred in the series produced by Sony "Los caballeros las prefieren brutas" which was produced for cable television latinoamérica where she plays the character of Cristina. The series is based on the book with the same title Isabella Santo Domingo. She is currently starring in a telenovela produced by FOX RCN Telecolombia called Un sueño llamado salsa (A dream called salsa).

Dominguez is also known for acting in Beyond Brotherhood (2017) and Do You Believe? (2015).

== Personal life ==
Valerie is first cousins with singer Shakira and is of Lebanese and Syrian descent.

Awards and achievements
Preceded by Adriana Tarud	Miss Colombia; 2005	Succeeded by Eileen Roca
Preceded by Adriana Tarud	Miss Atlántico; 2005	Succeeded by Carolina Ruiz
