= Valeria Morales =

Colombian model

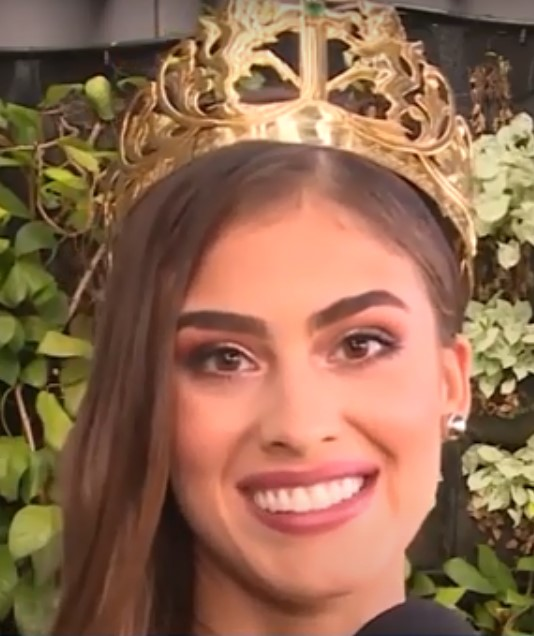
- Morales in 2018
- Born: Valeria Morales Delgado; 2 January 1998 (age 28); Cali, Valle del Cauca Department|Valle del Cauca, Colombia
- Education: Broward College (SC)
- Occupations: Model; journalist
- Height: 1.73 m (5 ft 8 in)
- Beauty pageant titleholder
- Title: Miss Universe Colombia 2018
- Hair color: Light brown
- Eye color: Hazel
- Major competitions: Miss Universe Colombia 2018 (Winner); Miss Universe 2018 (Unplaced)

Valeria Morales Delgado (born 2 January 1998) is a Colombian model and beauty pageant titleholder who was crowned Miss Universe Colombia 2018 on 30 September 2018. She represented Colombia at the Miss Universe 2018 pageant in Bangkok, Thailand, but did not place in the Top 20.

== Early life ==
On January 2, 1998, Morales was born and grew up in Cali, Colombia. She is a Social Communication student from Broward College in Florida, United States. She is the owner of Professional Models Fashion Academy.

== Pageantry ==
=== Miss Universe Colombia 2018 ===
Morales was crowned as Miss Universe Colombia 2018 held on September 30, 2018, at the Club El Rodeo in Medellín, Colombia. She succeeded outgoing Miss Universe Colombia 2017 and Miss Universe 2017's 1st Runner-up Laura González.

=== Miss Universe 2018 ===
As Miss Universe Colombia 2018, Morales represented Colombia at the Miss Universe 2018 pageant in Bangkok, Thailand. Although considered a favorite and front runner, Morales failed to place in the Top 20, ending Colombia's four year streak of consecutive placements, from 2014 through 2017. At the time of being crowned Miss Universe Colombia, Valeria Morales caused a storm with a statement that didn't show much goodwill when talking about the Spanish transgender beauty Ángela Ponce. " Miss Universe is a beauty pageant for women who are born a woman. That is detrimental to her. We respect but do not agree to share this playground with her." .

Awards and achievements
Preceded by Laura González	Miss Universe Colombia; 2018	Succeeded by Gabriela Tafur
