= Taliana Vargas =

Colombian model (born 1987)

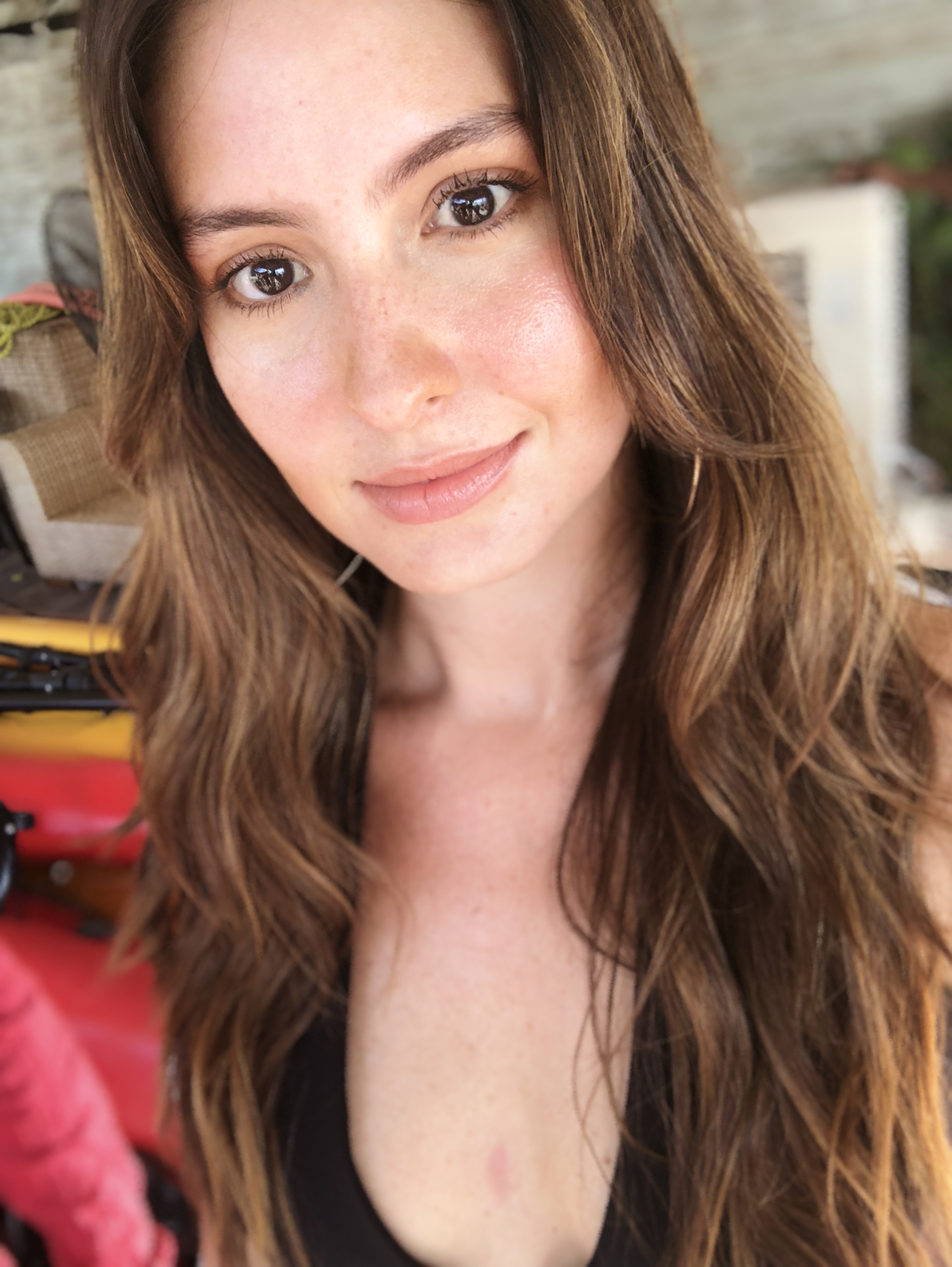

First Lady of Cali
- Assumed role 1 January 2024
- Mayor: Alejandro Eder
- Preceded by: Marcela Patiño

Personal details
- Born: Taliana María Vargas Carrillo; 20 December 1987 (age 38) Santa Marta, Magdalena, Colombia
- Spouse: Alejandro Eder (m. 2015)
- Children: 2
- Education: Northern Virginia Community College

Taliana María Vargas Carrillo (born 20 December 1987) is a Colombian beauty pageant titleholder who was crowned Miss Colombia 2007 and placed 1st Runner-Up at Miss Universe 2008. Vargas is a student of Journalism at the Northern Virginia Community College in Alexandria, Virginia.

== Pageantry ==
=== Miss Colombia 2007 ===
Vargas was crowned as Miss Colombia on November 12, 2007, thus bringing the first crown to her home department of Magdalena, Colombia. During the three-week-long competition, she was also awarded with the Miss Elegance, Best Face Award and The Queen of the Police.

=== Miss Universe 2008 ===
During the pageant, Vargas was a top 10 finalist in the Best National Costume competition and in the Best In Bikini event (which had no bearings on the selection of the top 15 semi-finalists), Vargas was awarded 2nd place while Miss Mexico, Elisa Nájera, took first place. On 14 July 2008, during the pageant's finals, Vargas was announced as one of the 15 semi-finalists. In the swimsuit competition, she received the highest score with 9.433, thus entering the top 10 in first place. During the evening gown portion, she received one of the highest televised scores in recent years: 9.829. Vargas thus became one of the 5 final contestants, coming in first place. Despite being the clear winner in two out of the three rounds, after the interview portion, it was Dayana Mendoza of Venezuela who went on to win the title of Miss Universe 2008 while Vargas ended up as 1st Runner-Up. Colombia has reached the 1st Runner-Up in Miss Universe during three consecutive years: Paola Turbay in 1992, Paula Andrea Betancourt in 1993, and Carolina Gomez in 1994. Her placement as 1st Runner-Up was the highest one of Colombia until Paulina Vega's victory in 2014.

== Acting career ==
Taliana appeared in her first leading role as Niña Cabrales in the RCN TV soap opera Chepe Fortuna in 2010. The show, a huge success in Colombia and other parts of South America, won Taliana a TVyNovelas Award for Favourite Actress in a Leading Role.

Taliana Vargas is the main character in a Colombian soap opera, Rafael Orozco El Idolo. The soap opera is about a Vallenato singer from Valledupar, Colombia and Taliana plays the wife of the singer.

In 2017, she played Paola Salcedo, the wife of the Cali Cartel's security chief in the third season of the American series made by Netflix; Narcos.

She has been the image of various brands in Colombia such as L'Oréal Paris Elvive, Studio F, Nestlé.

== Personal life ==
Born and raised in Santa Marta, Colombia, Vargas is of Greek, Colombian and Lebanese descent. Though some sources claim she's of full Greek descent. Her stepfather is Italian. She speaks fluent Spanish, English, and Italian, as well as some Greek and Arabic.

Vargas has been married since 15 August 2015 to the Cali politician, Alejandro Eder, with whom she has two children named Alicia and Antonio. She was active during her husband Alejandro Eder's political campaign for Mayor of Cali. Later on 29 October during the 2023 Colombian regional and municipal elections Alejandro would be elected as the new mayor of Cali, making her the new First Lady of Cali, her new role being that of social manager during the local administration of Alejandro Eder.

Awards and achievements
Preceded by (Brazil) Natália Guimarães	Miss Universe 1st Runner-Up; 2008	Succeeded by (Dominican Republic) Ada de la Cruz
Preceded by Eileen Roca	Miss Colombia; 2007	Succeeded by Michelle Rouillard
Preceded by Malka Irina Piña	Miss Magdalena; 2007	Succeeded by María Pinedo Manrique
