= Miss Colombia 2002 =

- Date: November 12, 2002
- Presenters: Jorge Alfredo Vargas; Paola Turbay; Claudia Elena Vásquez; Andrea Serna
- Venue: Centro de Convenciones Julio Cesar Turbay, Cartagena de Indias, Colombia
- Broadcaster: RCN TV
- Entrants: 25
- Placements: 10
- Winner: Diana Lucia Mantilla; Santander
- Congeniality: Juliana Tous; Córdoba
- Best National Costume: Jessica Pereira Hooker; San Andrés
- Photogenic: Gina Paola Arango; Valle

Miss Colombia 2002, the 68th Miss Colombia pageant, was held in Cartagena de Indias, Colombia, on November 12, 2002, after three weeks of events. The winner of the pageant was Diana Lucia Mantilla, Miss Santander.

The pageant was broadcast live on RCN TV from the Centro de Convenciones Julio Cesar Turbay in Cartagena de Indias, Colombia. At the conclusion of the final night of competition, outgoing titleholder Vanessa Mendoza crowned Diana Lucia Mantilla of Santander as the new Miss Colombia.

== Results ==
=== Placements ===
Placement	Contestant
Miss Colombia 2002	Santander – Diana Lucia Mantilla
1st Runner-Up	Cartagena – Isabel Sofía Cabrales
2nd Runner-Up	Santa Marta – Clara Inés Martínez
3rd Runner-Up	Caldas – Karla Zuluaga Suarez
4th Runner-Up	Valle – Gina Paola Arango
Top 10	Atlántico – Diana Moreno Hernández; Bolívar – Brenda María Juan Guardela; Guajira – Sara Elisa Parodi; Nariño – Luz Zulema Casanova; San Andrés – Jessica Pereira Hooker

== Delegates ==
The Miss Colombia 2002 delegates are:

- Antioquia - Carolina Giraldo García
- Atlántico - Diana María Moreno Hernández
- Barranquilla - Liliana de Cambil Ávila
- Bogotá D.C. - María Molina Salazar
- Bolívar - Brenda María Juan Guardela
- Caldas - Karla Zuluaga Suárez
- Cartagena DT y C - Isabel Sofia Cabrales Baquero
- Cauca - Liliana María Simmonds Villada
- Cesar - Berta de los Ángeles Velásquez B.
- Chocó - Carolina Quintero Schuller
- Córdoba - Sandra Juliana Tous de la Ossa
- Cundinamarca - Liliana Isabel Jiménez Moreno
- Guajira - Sara Elisa Parodi Brito
- Magdalena - Esther María Bornacelli García
- Meta - Andrea Viviana Svenson Gonfrier
- Nariño - Lina Zulema Casanova Del Castillo
- Norte de Santander - Naidu Patricia Illera Arango
- Quindío - Lina María Maya Giraldo
- Risaralda - Marcela Delgado Rincón
- San Andrés and Providencia - Jessica Samantha Pereira Hooker
- Santa Marta - Clara Inés Martínez Aarón
- Santander - Diana Lucia Mantilla Prada
- Sucre - Liliana Patricia Romero Iriarte
- Tolima - Adriana Katherine Coca Gaitán
- Valle - Gina Paola Arango Lemos
