= Carolina Cruz =

Colombian art model and presenter

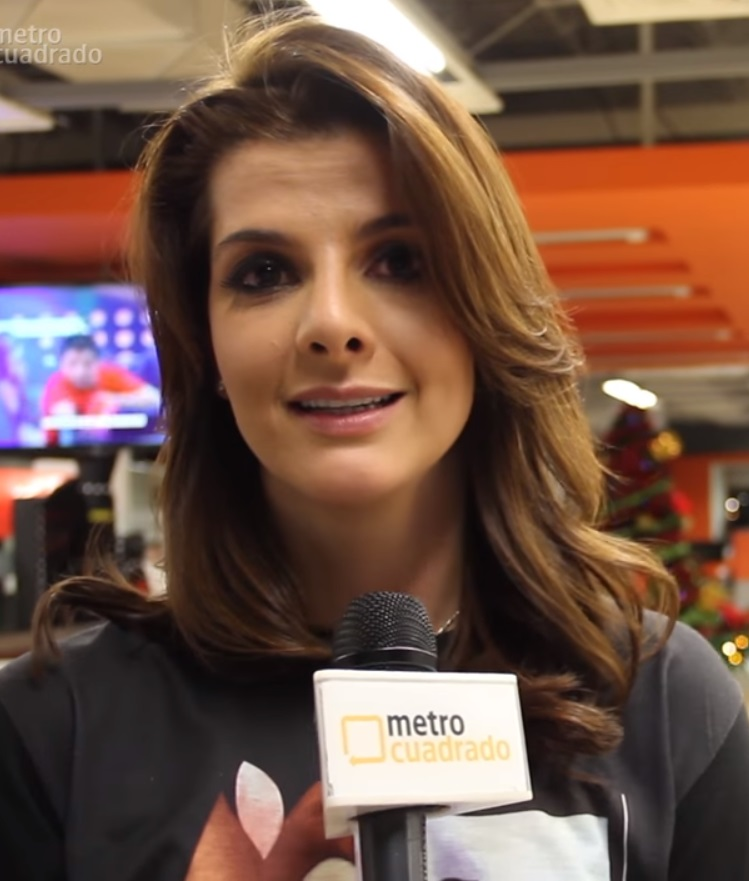
- Born: 12 June 1979 (age 47); Tuluá, Valle del Cauca, Colombia
- Years active: 1995–present

Carolina Cruz Osorio (born 12 June 1979) is a Colombian journalist, television host, model, businesswoman and beauty pageant titleholder who represented her country at Miss International 2000 where sheplaced Top 15.

== Early life and career ==
She lived her childhood and adolescence in Cali. She was a cheerleader and fan of the América de Cali soccer team during adolescence, this being her first job. In 1999, she participated in Miss Colombia, representing Valle del Cauca where she ranked second, being the winner of the title of Miss Colombia International or Viceroy National. The winner of the pageant was Miss Cundinamarca, Catalina Acosta, and the following year she represented Colombia in Miss International.

After the contest, she continued with modeling and reporting jobs at El Noticiero del Espectáculo, for the Jorge Barón Television programmer. In 2000, she was linked to Canal RCN as host of the show Comandos together with Iván Lalinde and led the presentation of the entertainment slot of Noticias RCN, together with Andrea Serna. Shortly after, she joined the cast of Muy buenos días, along with Jota Mario Valencia and Yaneth Waldman. After five years, and after participating in the reality show Dancing for a dream, which she won, she decided not to return to presenting the magazine. In 2007, she hosted the third season of the reality show Extreme Change. Later, she created her own company, Carolina Cruz Empresa Unipersonal and Carolina Cruz Jewelry and Accessories. There she has hired women from the Vida Nueva Foundation. In 2012, she joined the Oriflame company, a catalog sales brand around the world, to distribute her brand abroad.

In the following years, she was presenting several programs, among which Planeta Gente from NTN24, Justo a tiempo and Cita a ciegas from RCN Televisión stand out. After thirteen years in that channel, she resigned and joined Canal Caracol, where she participated as a presenter in the broadcasts of Miss Universe and Colombia's Next Top Model. Currently, she is happy with her son Matías and her husband Lincoln with whom she lives in a free union. In August 2018, she joined the morning program Día a día on Caracol Televisión as a presenter. Her best friend is Paola Calle, she belongs to the petit committee formed by Andrea Serna, Yaneth Waldman, Jéssica de la Peña, Ángela Cardozo.

== Filmography ==
=== Presenter ===
Year	Qualification	Role	Channel
2021	I'm coming for you, play for me	Participant	Caracol Television
2018–present	Day by day	Presenter	Caracol Television
2014–2017	Colombia's Next Top Model	Presenter	Caracol Television
2014-2019	International Festival of Humor	Presenter	Caracol Television
2013–2015	Miss Universe	Presenter	Caracol Television
2010	Blind date	Presenter	RCN Channel
2009–2010	Just in time	Presenter	RCN Channel
2008	Planet people	Presenter	NTN24
2007	Illusion, magic and humor		
2007	Extreme change	Presenter	RCN Channel
2002-2004-2012	National Beauty Contest of Colombia	Presenter	RCN Channel
2002–2013	RCN news	Presenter	RCN Channel
2002–2006	Good morning	Presenter	RCN Channel
2000–2001	Until now I have breakfast	Presenter	RCN Channel
2000	Commands	Presenter	RCN Channel
2000	Panorama	Presenter	Channel A
1999	Show Newscast	Presenter	Jorge Barón Television

== Awards and nominations ==
Year	Category	Newscast / Magazine	Result
2013	Best Entertainment Host/Host	RCN News	Nominated
2012	Best Entertainment Host/Host	RCN News	Nominated
2010	Best Entertainment Host/Host	RCN News	Won
2009	Best Entertainment Host/Host	RCN News	Won
2008	Best Entertainment Host/Host	RCN News	Won
2006	Best Entertainment Host/Host	RCN News	Won

=== India Catalina Awards ===
Year	Category	Newscast/Magazing	Result
2013	Best Host/Entertainment Host	RCN News	Nominated
