= Valentina Mora =

Colombian model and Miss Colombia Supranational 2023

- Born: Valentina Mora Trujillo; November 26, 1997 (age 28); Medellín, Antioquia Colombia
- Education: Eafit University, Medellín, Colombia
- Height: 1.76 m (5 ft 9 1/2 in)
- Beauty pageant titleholder
- Title: Señorita Antioquia 2022; Miss Colombia Supranational 2023
- Hair color: Brown
- Eye color: Brown
- Major competitions: Miss Colombia 2022 (1st Runner-Up); Miss Supranational 2023 (Top 24)

Valentina Mora Trujillo is a Colombian beauty pageant titleholder who was the first runner-up of Miss Colombia 2022 and represented her country at Miss Supranational 2023 where she reached the Top 24.

== Early life ==
Valentina Mora was born in Medellín, Colombia on November 26, 1997. She studied high school at the Colegio Colombo Británico (British Colombian School) of Envigado, Antioquia. a bilingual institution, where she learned to speak English, addition to her native Spanish. She pursued a bachelor's degree in social communication at the Eafit University.

== Pageantry ==
=== Señorita Antioquia 2022 ===
Mora's was designated in July 2022, when she was selected Señorita Antioquia and then represent Antioquia at Miss Colombia in November of the same year.

=== Señorita Colombia 2022 ===
Mora represented Antioquia at Miss Colombia 2022 and was the Virreina Nacional (1st Runner-up) to Sofía Osío of Atlántico.

=== Miss Supranational 2023 ===
She was designated Miss Colombia Supranational in February 2023, and represented Colombia at Miss Supranational 2023 where she reached the Top 24.

Awards and achievements
Preceded by Natalia López, Quindío	Señorita Colombia Virreina; 2022	Succeeded by Incumbent
Preceded by Valentina Espinosa, Bolívar	Miss Colombia Supranational; 2023	Succeeded by Sherren Londoño, Cundinamarca
Preceded by Ana María Ospina, Antioquia	Señorita Antioquia; 2022	Succeeded by Catalina Duque Abréu, Antioquia
