= Sabanalarga =

Sabanalarga could may refer to the following places in Colombia:

- Sabanalarga, Antioquia
- Sabanalarga, Atlántico
- Sabanalarga, Casanare
