= Istituto Europeo di Design =

Design school in Italy

Coordinates: 45°28′41″N 9°13′39″E

European Institute of Design
- Istituto Europeo di Design
- Established: 1966
- Founders: Francesco Morelli
- Administrative staff: 1,800 (freelance) 500 (in-house)
- Students: 13,000
- Location: Turin; Milan; Rome; Venice; Cagliari; Como; Florence; Barcelona; Madrid; Bilbao; São Paulo; Rio de Janeiro; Beijing; Shanghai
- Website: https://www.ied.edu/ https://www.ied.it/ https://ied.tw/

The Istituto Europeo di Design (IED) is a private design school in Italy founded in 1966 by Francesco Morelli. Alberico Guerzoni is the director of its flagship location in Milan.

The school is organized into four disciplines: Design, Fashion, Visual Communication and Management.

It is spread over thirteen cities—Milan, Turin, Venice, Cagliari, Como, Florence, Rome, Barcelona, Madrid, Bilbao, São Paulo, Beijing, Rio de Janeiro and Shanghai—and thirteen locations. It offers 29 different courses of three-year duration, in several languages: English, Italian, Spanish and Portuguese. These courses are attended by about 10,000 students every year.

== Facts and figures ==
The Istituto Europeo di Design, located in Italy, allows students to study for a Bachelor of Arts degree. Those who successfully complete the three-year course, obtain the 'Diploma Accademico di primo Livello' (i.e., Academic Diploma, First Level) which is legally recognized by the MIUR (Ministry of Education, University and Research) in the category of High Artistic Training (Ministerial Decree 10 December 2010 n. 292).

In Spain, the institute offers the Bachelor of Arts with Honours, Masters and Postgraduates, Continuing Study Programs, Summer Courses and Executive Programs in Product Design, Fashion Design, Interior Design and Graphic Design. Students who complete the four-year course obtain a Bachelor of Arts with Honours degree. In Brazil, the IED offers the Diploma Universitário, which can be obtained after a three-year course in Fashion, Design and Visual Arts. In China, the institute offers the Bachelor of Arts with Honours in Fashion, Visual Arts, Industrial Design and project management. IED courses in Rome have a special focus in the areas of cinema, television and the new media. IED has two campuses in Milan, IED Moda and IED Design in two different locations. IED Turin, operating since 1989, is located in a residential area in the city centre.

== Alumni ==
=== Faculty ===
- James Rivière, Italian jeweler
- Giuseppe La Spada, Italian interdisciplinary artist

=== Alumni ===
- Hélène Binet (born 1959), Swiss-French architectural photographer
- Franco Lodato (born 1962), Italian-American Industrial Designer
- Maria Grazia Chiuri (born 1964), Italian fashion designer, creative director
- Manuel Alberto Claro (born 1970), Chilean-Danish cinematographer, filmmaker and still photographer
- Hazem Harb (born 1980), Palestinian painter, collagist, photographer, and installation artist
- Natalie Korneitsik (born c. 1993), Estonian fashion model, beauty queen
- Phaim Bhuiyan (born 1995), Italian actor, film director, and producer.
- Sofía Osío (born 2000), Colombian model, and Miss Colombia 2022
