= Miss Colombia 2024 =

70th edition of the Miss Colombia competition

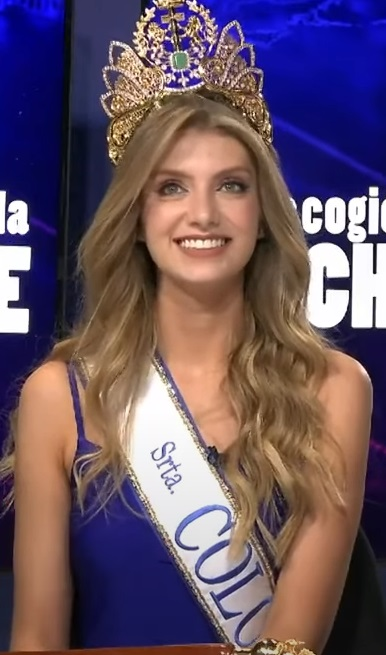
- Catalina Duque
- Date: November 10, 2024
- Presenters: Catalina Robayo; Juliana Habib
- Venue: Julio Cesar Turbay Auditorium, Cartagena, Colombia
- Broadcaster: Official broadcasters: Telecaribe; RCN Televisión; Cosmovisión; Telepacífico; Canal TRO; Teleislas; ¡Hola! TV
- Entrants: 32
- Placements: 10
- Debuts: Riohacha
- Withdrawals: Casanare; Cauca
- Returns: Barranquilla; Bucaramanga; Cúcuta; Putumayo
- Winner: Catalina Duque Abréu; Antioquia

Miss Colombia 2024 was the 70th Miss Colombia pageant, held at the Julio Cesar Turbay Auditorium in Cartagena, Colombia, on November 10, 2024.

Sofía Osío of Atlántico crowned her successor Catalina Duque Abréu of Antioquia at the end of the event.

== Background ==
=== Location and date ===
In November 2024, as usual, it will be held in the city of Cartagena at the Julio Cesar Turbay Auditorium.

=== Selection of participants ===
Contestants from thirty-two departments and cities have been selected to compete. All of these delegates were designated or elected by the respective departmental beauty committees or through a casting process.

==== Debuts, returns, and withdrawals ====
This edition will mark the debut of Tumaco and Riohacha, as well as the return of Putumayo, Barranquilla, Cúcuta, Caldas and Caquetá. Putumayo last competed in 2000; Barranquilla competed for the last time in 2002; Cúcuta last competed in 2007; Caldas last competed in 2018; while Caquetá last competed in 2021.

== Results ==
=== Placements ===
- The contestant won an international pageant.
- The contestant was a finalist/runner-up in an international pageant.
- The contestant was a semi-finalist in an international pageant.

Placement	Contestant	International placement
Miss Colombia 2024	Antioquia – Catalina Duque Abréu	Winner – Miss International 2025
1st runner-up	Atlántico – Nicolle Marie Ospina	
2nd runner-up	Caribbean Region – Juliana Osorio	
3rd runner-up	Valle del Cauca – Valentina Tafur	
4th runner-up	Riohacha – Olga María Álvarez	Winner – Miss Mesoamerica 2025
Top 10	Barranquilla – Sharon Gamarra; Cartagena – Yaniris Yulieth Castellar; Chocó – Ángela Natalia Capella; Norte de Santander – Liz Zamara Yanquen	
Top 10	Tolima – María José Chacon	Top 12 – Miss Charm 2025

== Contestants ==
Thirty-two contestants competed for the title.

Department/City	Contestant	Age (Note: Ages at the time of the pageant)	Hometown
Andean Region	Jennifer Dayana Contreras Sáenz	24	Bogotá
Antioquia	Catalina Duque Abréu	24	Medellín
Atlántico	Nicolle Marie Ospina Ulloque	23	Barranquilla
Barranquilla	Sharon Gamarra	21	Barranquilla
Bogotá	María Fernanda Prada González	24	Bogotá
Bolívar	Andrea Valentina Vásquez Franco	23	Cartagena
Boyacá	Tiffany Atencia Peña	21	Bogota
Buenaventura	Angie Pamela Cuero Lozano	23	Buenaventura
Bucaramanga	Valentina Peña Blanco	27	Bucaramanga
Caribbean Region	Juliana Osorio Ángulo	22	Cartagena
Cartagena	Yaniris Yulieth Castellar Altamar	25	Cartagena
Cesar	Daniela Mejía Navarro	23	Valledupar
Chocó	Ángela Natalia Capella Córdoba	24	Quibdó
Córdoba	María Nelly Conde	22	Cereté
Cúcuta	Marlyn Mildreth Misse Martínez	24	Cúcuta
Cundinamarca	Angie Catherine Peña Beltrán	27	Cabrera
La Guajira	María Carolina Padilla Durán	21	San Juan del Cesar
Huila	María Juliana Bonilla Buitrago	25	Neiva
Magdalena	Ana Carolina Cucunubá Gutiérrez	22	Santa Marta
Meta	Marisleysis Andrea Bobadilla Ramírez	24	Valledupar
Nariño	Ángela Nathalia Montaño Bolaños	24	Pasto
Norte de Santander	Liz Zamara Yanquen Flórez	23	Pamplona
Pacific Region	Junny Yasseni Castro Mosquera	26	Atrato
Putumayo	Claudia Marcela Chávez Roa	25	Mocoa
Quindío	María José Cardona Salazar	22	Armenia
Riohacha	Olga María Álvarez Campuzano	27	Riohacha
Risaralda	Valentina González Rengifo	25	Pereira
San Andrés	Sheila Johanna Newball McLean	25	Providencia
Santander	Kimberly Valle Amaris	25	Bucaramanga
Sucre	Laura Sofía Paniagua Cohen	22	Sincelejo
Tolima	María José Chacon	22	Bogotá
Valle del Cauca	Valentina Tafur Náder	25	Cali
