= Juanita Urrea =

Colombian beauty pageant titleholder

- Born: Juanita Urrea Posada; September 13, 2000 (age 26); Armenia, Quindío, Colombia
- Education: ICESI University
- Beauty pageant titleholder
- Title: Miss Colombia International 2024
- Major competitions: Miss Colombia 2022; (3rd Runner-Up); Miss International 2024; (Unplaced)

Juanita Urrea Posada (born September 13, 2000) is a Colombian beauty pageant titleholder who won Miss Colombia International 2024. She represented Colombia at Miss International 2024.

== Early life ==
Juanita Urrea was born in Armenia, Quindío on September 13, 2000. She is the only child of Andrea Posada and the industrial engineer Alonso Urrea. During her childhood and youth she lived in Buenaventura, Cartago and finally Cali where she finished her high school studies at the Colegio Hispanoamericano.

Later she completed her university studies at the ICESI University with a degree in Industrial Engineering. In addition to her native Spanish, she speaks fluent English.

== Pageantry ==
Urrea won Miss Valle. Urrea was the third runner-up at Miss Colombia 2022, in Cartagena. On December 29, 2023, the contest's board of directors designated Urrea as the representative of Colombia for Miss International 2024.

Awards and achievements
Preceded by Sofía Osío	Miss Colombia International; 2024	Succeeded by Catalina Duque
Preceded by María Lucía Cuesta Arias	Segunda Princesa Colombia; 2022	Succeeded by Valentina Tafur
Preceded by Kelly Daniela Erazo Toro	Miss Valle; 2022	Succeeded by Valentina Tafur
