= Catalina Duque =

Colombian beauty pageant titleholder

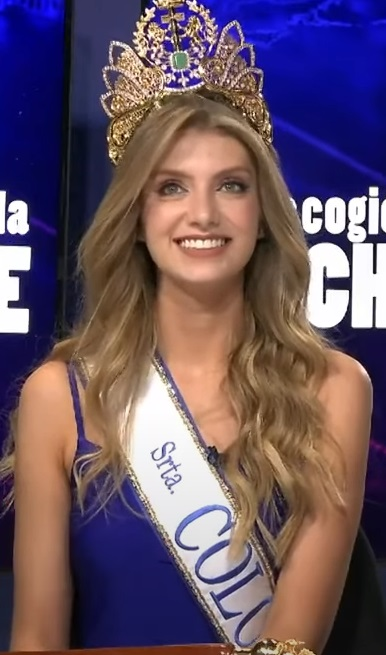
- Born: Catalina Duque Abréu; September 29, 1999 (age 27); Miami, Florida, U.S.
- Education: Eafit University
- Beauty pageant titleholder
- Title: Miss Antioquia 2024; Miss Colombia 2024; Miss International 2025
- Major competitions: Miss Colombia 2024; (Winner); Miss International 2025; (Winner)

Catalina Duque Abréu (born September 29, 1999) is a Colombian beauty pageant titleholder who won Miss International 2025. She previously won Miss Colombia 2024 and is the fourth Colombian woman to win the Miss International title.

== Early life ==
Catalina Duque Abréu was born on September 29 1999 in Miami, Florida, United States, to Colombian parents from Medellín, Antioquia. Her father is Dr. Carlos Simon Duque Fisher of German-American ancestry and her mother is Clara Abreu Vélez of Portuguese ancestry. She attended high school at The Columbus School in Envigado, Antioquia, and later studied social communication at Eafit University. In addition to her native language, she is fluent in English and Portuguese.

== Pageantry ==
=== Señorita Antioquia 2023-2024 ===
Duque was declared Miss Antioquia in June 2023, for Miss Colombia 2023, in November 2023. The contest was cancelled, and postponed until 2024.

=== Señorita Colombia 2024 ===
Duque won Miss Colombia 2024 on November 10, 2024 in Cartagena, Bolívar. She was crowned by outgoing titleholder Sofía Osío, and was the seventh representative from Antioquia to win the title.

=== Miss International 2025 ===
Duque represented Colombia and won Miss International 2025 on 27 November 2025 in Yoyogi National Gymnasium, Tokyo, Japan. Duque became the fourth Colombian to win the title.

Awards and achievements
Preceded by Huỳnh Thị Thanh Thủy, Vietnam	Miss International; 2025	Succeeded by Incumbent
Preceded by Juanita Urrea	Miss Colombia International; 2025	Succeeded by María Antonia Mosquera
Preceded by Sofía Osío	Miss Colombia; 2024	Succeeded by María Antonia Mosquera
Preceded by Valentina Mora	Miss Antioquia; 2024	Succeeded by Incumbent
