= Giuseppe La Spada =

Giuseppe La Spada (born 1974 in Palermo) artist, director and photographer inspired by nature, poetry and sound.

== Biography ==
Giuseppe La Spada is an interdisciplinary artist whose research explores the human-nature relationship, with the aim of sensitising the public to environmental issues. In particular, the water element flows throughout his entire artistic practice, becoming each time the subject or the context, at times even the medium.

Today he focuses on photography, video and installations - three-dimensional, interactive or process-based.

Born in 1974 in Palermo, he grows up in Milazzo. In 2002 he graduated with honors in Digital Design at Istituto Europeo di Design in Rome, where he remained as a professor until 2004. In 2006 Istituto Europeo di Design Rome conferred him the prize for best carrier in Visual Arts. In 2007 he won the prestigious Webby Award, thanks to an ecological web project: the website “Mono No Aware” in support of the project “Stop Rokkasho” founded by Oscar winner Ryuichi Sakamoto. That same evening also David Bowie, Beastie Boys and YouTube founders received an award. In 2008 he worked with Sakamoto and Fennesz during the tournèe “Cendre”, which ended with the unforgettable show at Ground Zero in New York. In 2010 he gave life, to “Afleur”, a live show which he also declined in a very particular and ecological object-book.

In 2011, with the participation of more than 600 people, he staged an impressive tree in Piazza Duomo (Milan) in order to raise public awareness on the problem of pollution. In 2012 curated the Ca'Del Bosco event 'With All Your Senses’, where he created an interactive multisensorial artwork well appreciated by critics and press. From the same year is also a video 'Hana no ame’with Ryuichi Sakamoto composer for Kizuna World project to raise donation for Japan earthquake victims. In 2014 his digital manipulation were exhibit in 'Tate Loud Collective', in Tate Britain. In 2015 his artwork 'Migrants' was digitally displayed iat Louvre, Exposure Award. In the same year in October the artist present at Triennale a Milano ‘Sublimis’, his interdisciplinare project related with Humans and Water, developed in collaborazione with eminenti international scientists and artists, as Ryuichi Sakamoto who create the indent music composition Shizen no Koe. The same project was presented also in Seaport Museum, New York, in 2016. Always in 2016 he had his solo-exhibition ”Underwater” at Ecomuseo del Mare, Palermo. In 2017 Shizen no Koe, his interactive water installation, is displayed during 'Festival for the Earth' at the Oceanographic Museum of Monaco in the presence of HSH Prince Albert II. In 2018 he takes part in Manifesta 12 Collateral in Palermo with Fluctus, a huge plastic installation. In the same year, his work is also featured in the exhibition Re-Use, among artists as Man Ray, Duchamp, Piero Manzoni, Christo, Pistoletto, Penone, Tony Cragg, Damien Hirst. [etc.] In 2019 he exhibits the Traiettorie Liquide project in Rome, Bologna, Turin, Genoa and Monaco with photos of the world champion Federica Brignone portrayed while skiing underwater. In the same year he directed the video of the song by Franco Battiato Torneremo Ancora. Currently, he lives and works in Milan embracing his relentless research on the human-nature relationship as both an aesthetic artistic mission and a truly ethic one, with the aim of giving a real contribution to the human society.

The exclusive use of natural elements (water in the first place) positions him as one of the Italian artists most sensitive to environmental issues. One of his peculiar characteristics is the ability to translate communication needs and raw ideas into 360° creative projects, making skillful use of all the different media available today.

Member of The International Academy of Digital Arts and Sciences (New York), Contract Professor of Digital Animation at Accademia di Belle Arti di Brera (Milan 2010–2019), and Professor of Art Direction at Istituto Europeo di Design in Milan, he lives and works in Milan.
