= James Rivière =

Italian artist, designer, and sculptor (born 1949)

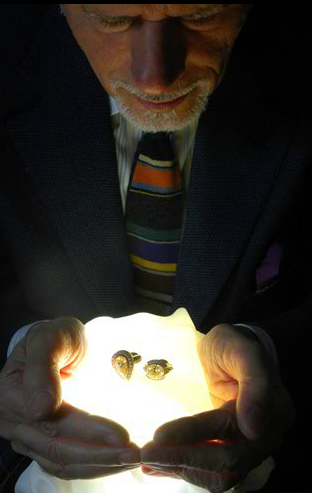
- Born: 1949 (age 75–76); Italy
- Occupations: Artist; designer; sculptor

James Rivière (born 1949) is an Italian artist, designer, and sculptor. His jewellery designs are held in private collections, and in museums including the Louvre, Victoria and Albert, and Vatican Museums.

He is a faculty member at Istituto Europeo di Design, Milan.
