= Franco Lodato =

Italian -American industrial designer (born 1962)

- Born: September 29, 1962 (age 64); Caracas, Venezuela
- Education: IED Milan; Industrial Design Engineer from Universidad Tecnológica Sucre, Venezuela
- Occupation: Industrial designer-Inventor-Academician
- Known for: Bionic and Biomimicry, Sustainable Design, and Innovation in Healthcare, Personal Grooming, Luxury Lifestyle, Wearables, and Consumer Electronics

Franco Lodato is an Italian-American industrial designer, best known for his work in biomimicry and sustainable design. He owns more than 70 patents across multiple industries.

== Career ==
=== Academic Work ===
Lodato held different teaching and research positions, including;

- Served as an associate professor at the University of Montreal School of Design (1996-2009), under Albert Leclerc
- Designer-in-Residence at the University of South Florida, (2009-2010)
- Visiting lecturer at the MIT Media Laboratory (2004-2014), collaborated with Nicholas Negroponte, Walter Bender, Ted Selker, Ros Picard, Sandy Petland, Neil Gerhenfeld, and Hiroshi Ishii
- Institute of Human and Machine Cognition (2017-2023): contributed with David Fries in cognitive design practices in complex environments.
- He is the vice president of the Industrial Designers Society of America (IDSA), Florida Chapter.

=== Industry leadership roles ===
Lodato has held different leadership positions:

- Vice President of Industrial Design and Innovation at Herman Miller
- BioDesign Lead at DuPont
- Innovation Lead at Gillette
- Vice President and Managing Director for the Americas Operation at Pininfarina: contributions to iconic designs, such as the Maserati Birdcage 75th.
- Design Leadership Roles at Motorola and Kids2

His corporate work assignments and consulting career includes research and design for global enterprises such as Coca-Cola, Ferrari-Maserati, Bombardier, Challenger Powerboats, and as a Master Innovator, in Wearable technology for Google-Motorola. At Motorola, Lodato developed Android Smartphones and Tablet computers, Wi-Fi, 4G, Push-to-talk, and customized hardware solutions utilizing CDMA, UMTS, and IDEN standards. He established new partnerships and licensing agreements with Ferrari, Gucci, Karpersky, Lamborghini, Sprint, Bertone, and Pininfarina. He established technology research and development collaborations with major U.S. and international universities including, MIT, University of Florida, McGill University, Stanford University, Istituto Europeo di Design, Politecnicco di Milano, and IED Torino.

Lodato was the founder of the pre-engineering program at American Heritage School Plantation and an instructor in the program from 2007 to 2015. As of 2019 he is SVP Design & Innovation for Kids2, one of the fastest growing baby product companies in the world. Lodato holds 60 U.S. and 18 international implementation and design patents and is a member of the National Academy of Inventors.

== Notable designs ==
Lodato designed the seal for the National Academy of Inventors, an "arrow that girdles the globe, representing the idea that 'innovation moves the world.'"

Woodpecker ice axe designed by Lodato

A sampling of phones designed by Lodato

== Bibliography ==
- Lodato, Franco (2020). "Bionics in Action". Bionica e Design. São Paulo: Blucher. pp. 250–261. doi:10.5151/9788580394207-18. ISBN 9788580394207.
- Bernsen, Jens (2004). Bionics in Action: The Design Work of Franco Lodato. StoryWorks DK. ISBN 978-8798871873.
- Lodato, Franco (2010). "Bionics in Action: The Nature of Invention". Technology & Innovation. 12 (2): 79–88. doi:10.3727/194982410x12858510212160.
- Lodato, Franco (2005). "The Nature of Design". Design Management Review. 16 (1): 56–61. doi:10.1111/j.1948-7169.2005.tb00008.x.

== Achievements & Recognition ==
As an Associate Editor, Lodato contributed to advancing bioengineering and biomimetics with key articles such as:

- Kinematics and Aerodynamics of Dragonflies in Climbing Flight
- Egg-inspired Engineering in the Design of Thin-walled Shelled Vessels: A Theoretical Approach for Shell Strength
- Convenient Design Method for Customized Implants Based on Bionic Vein Structure Features
- DPED: Bio-inspired Dual-Pathway Network for Edge Detection
