= Miss Colombia 2022 =

69th edition of the Miss Colombia competition

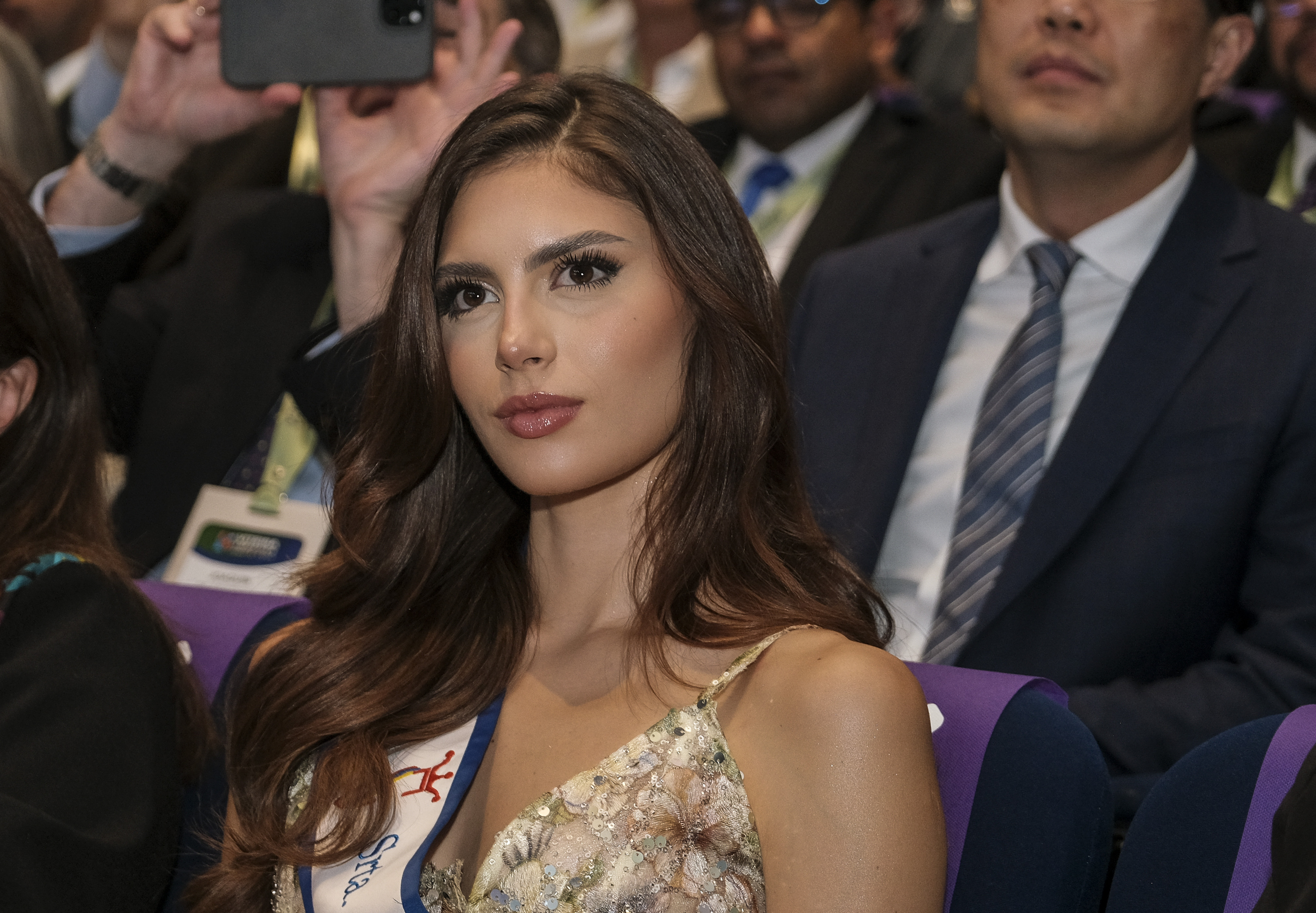
- Sofía Osío
- Date: 13 November 2022
- Presenters: Humberto Rodríguez; Catalina Robayo
- Venue: Julio Cesar Turbay Ayala Convention Center, Cartagena, Colombia
- Broadcaster: Telecaribe; RCN Televisión; Cosmovisión; Telepacífico; Canal TRO; Teleislas; ¡Hola! TV
- Entrants: 29
- Placements: 10
- Debuts: Andean Region; Pacific Region
- Withdrawals: Arauca; Caqueta
- Returns: Buenaventura; Casanare; Cauca; Cesar; Meta
- Winner: Sofía Osío Luna; Atlántico
- Congeniality: Whitney Towanda Copete; Andean Region
- Best National Costume: Susana Villota Melo; Nariño; Fabiana Caleño; Sucre

Miss Colombia 2022 was the 69th Miss Colombia pageant, held at the Julio Cesar Turbay Ayala Convention Center in Cartagena, Colombia, on 13 November 2022.

At the end of the event, Valentina Espinosa of Bolivar crowned Sofía Osío Luna of Atlántico as Señorita Colombia 2022. She represented Colombia at Miss International 2023 and was named first runner-up.

The 2023 edition of the Miss Colombia pageant that supposedly happened in November 2023 was cancelled due to the economic crisis currently happening in Colombia. Due to this, the pageant organizers decided to send the third runner-up Juanita Urrea to the Miss International 2024 pageant.

== Pageant ==
=== Format ===
The results of the preliminary competition, which consisted of the swimsuit competition, the evening gown competition, and the closed-door interview, will determine the ten semi-finalists who will advance to the first cut. Internet voting is still being implemented and fans can vote for their favorite delegate to advance to the finals. The ten semi-finalists competed in the swimsuit and evening gown competitions and was then narrowed down to five. The five finalists competed in the question and answer round, and the final walk before the winner, Miss Colombia 2022, and her runners-up are announced.

=== Judges ===
- Daniella Álvarez – Presenter, TV host and Miss Colombia 2011
- Eduardo Díaz – Panamanian economist
- Mario López Chavarri – Peruvian diplomat and politician
- Carlos Santa Cruz – Spanish businessman

== Results ==
=== Placements ===
- The contestant won an international pageant.
- The contestant was a finalist/runner-up in an international pageant.
- The contestant was a semi-finalist in an international pageant.

Placement	Contestant	International placement
Señorita Colombia 2022	Atlántico – Sofía Osío	1st runner-up – Miss International 2023
1st runner-up	Antioquia – Valentina Mora	Top 24 – Miss Supranational 2023
2nd runner-up	Norte de Santander – Andrea Yáñez	1st runner-up – Miss Mesoamerica 2023
3rd runner-up	Valle del Cauca – Juanita Urrea	Unplaced – Miss International 2024
4th runner-up	Tolima – Laura León	
Top 10	Cartagena – María Camila Sinning	Winner – Reina Internacional del Cacao 2023
Top 10	Caribbean Region – Brigith Navarro	Winner – Miss Mesoamerica 2024
Top 10	Cesar – Luisa Sanmiguel; Chocó – Sonia Cuesta	
Top 10	Risaralda – Vanesa Velasquez	Top 6 – Miss Charm 2024

=== Special awards ===
Award	Contestant
Miss Punctuality	Valle del Cauca – Juanita Urrea
Miss Elegance	Norte de Santander – Andrea Yáñez
Miss Congeniality	Andean Region – Whitney Towanda Copete
Miss Smart Fit	Antioquia – Valentina Mora
Best National Costume	Sucre – Fabiana Caleño; Nariño– Susana Villota Melo
Comprehensive Beauty	Huila – Paula Andrea Alarcon
Civic Queen	Cartagena – María Camila Sinning

== Contestants ==
Twenty-nine contestants competed for the title.

Department/City	Contestant	Age (Note: Ages at the time of the pageant)	Hometown
Andean Region	Whitney Sarath Towanda Copete Moreno	24	Pereira
Antioquia	Valentina María Mora Trujillo	24	Medellín
Atlántico	Sofía Osío Luna	22	Barranquilla
Bogotá	Mariana Potes Morales	19	Miami-Dade County
Bolívar	María José Hernández Tobón	23	Pereira
Boyacá	Laura Valentina Borda Salamanca	25	Duitama
Buenaventura	Luisa Fernanda Lozano González	24	Cali
Caribbean Region	Brigith Navarro Lugo	21	Soledad
Cartagena	María Camila Sinning Martínez	24	Cartagena
Casanare	Karol Gisela Garzón Alfonso	24	Sabanalarga
Cauca	Laura Isabella Triana Ulcue	22	Popayán
Cesar	Luisa Alejandra Sanmiguel Quiroz	23	Valledupar
Chocó	Sonia Marcela Cuesta Morales	23	Santa Marta
Córdoba	Julieth Daniela Guerrero Mafioli	20	Bogotá
Cundinamarca	María Angélica García Alonso	23	Bogotá
La Guajira	María Kanela Peláez Cerchiaro	23	Barrancas
Huila	Paula Andrea Alarcón Vargas	23	Neiva
Magdalena	Marianella Lara Piña	23	Santa Marta
Meta	Luisa Fernanda Álvarez Martín	24	Villavicencio
Nariño	Susana Villota Melo	23	Pasto
Norte de Santander	Andrea Katherine Yáñez García	22	Cúcuta
Pacific Region	Lina Marcela Ángulo Oribio	24	Timbiquí
Quindío	Sara Victoria Castaño Ramos	22	Armenia
Risaralda	Vanesa Velásquez Valencia	23	Cartago
San Andrés and Providencia	Brithalye Susana de Ávila Bowie	21	San Andrés
Santander	Mónica Rocío Blanco Alarcón	26	Mogotes
Sucre	Fabiana Paola Caleño Arrieta	19	Buenavista
Tolima	Laura Juliana León Ramírez	24	Ibagué
Valle del Cauca	Juanita Urrea Posada	22	Armenia

== Notes ==
=== Post-pageant notes ===
- Valentina Mora of Antioquia finished as Top 24 at the Miss Supranational 2023 in Malopolska, Poland and ranked as 15th placed according to the Miss Supranational Facebook & Instagram official pages.
- Andrea Yáñez of Norte de Santander finished as 1st runner-up at the Miss Mesoamerica 2023 pageant in San Salvador, El Salvador.
- María Camila Sinning of Cartagena won the Reinado Internacional del Cacao 2023 in Panama.
- Paula Andrea Alarcón Vargas of Huila finished as 4th runner-up at Reina Hispanoamericana 2023, held in Santa Cruz de la Sierra, Bolivia.
- Juanita Urrea of Valle del Cauca was appointed to compete at Miss International 2024, held in Japan.
