= Miss International =

Beauty pageant competition, Organization

- Type: International women's beauty pageant
- Headquarters: Tokyo, Japan
- First edition: 1960
- Most recent edition: 2025
- Current titleholder: Catalina Duque; Colombia
- President: Akemi Shimomura
- Language: English
- Website: www.miss-international.org

Miss International (Miss International Beauty or The International Beauty Pageant) is a Japan-based international major beauty pageant organized by the International Culture Association. First held in 1960, it is the fourth largest pageant in the world in terms of the number of national winners participating in the international contest.

Along with Miss World, Miss Universe, and Miss Earth, the pageant is one of the Big Four beauty pageants. The Miss International Organization and the brand are currently owned (since 1968), along with Miss International Japan, by the International Cultural Association and Miss Paris Group. The pageant crown used by the organization is supplied and patented by the Mikimoto pearl company.

In 2020 and again in 2021, the pageant was canceled due to the COVID-19 pandemic.

The current Miss International is Catalina Duque of Colombia, who was crowned on 27 November 2025 in Tokyo, Japan.

== History ==
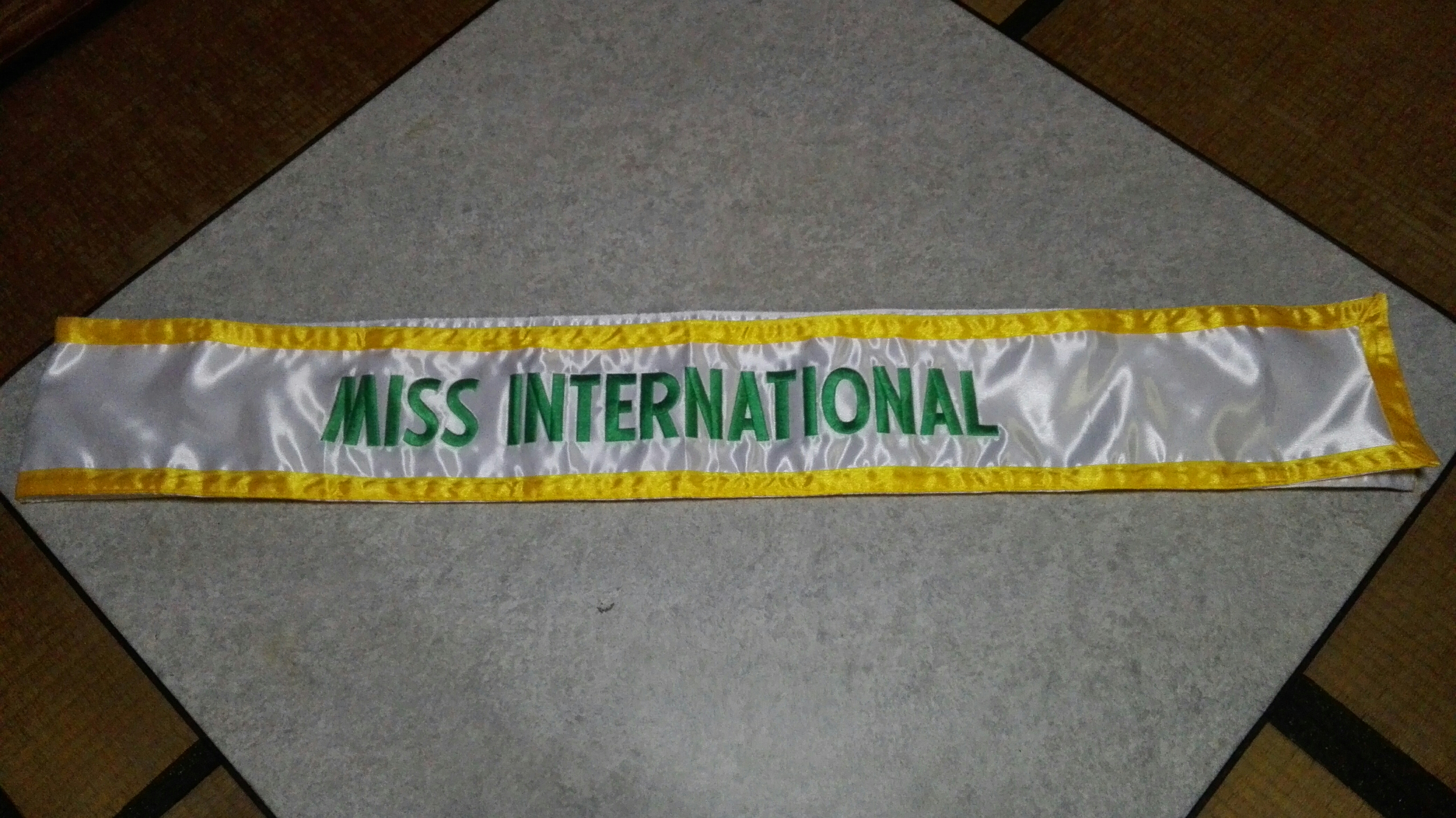
Miss International sash

The pageant was created in Long Beach, California, United States in 1960, after the departure of the Miss Universe pageant to Miami Beach. Hosted in Long Beach until 1967, the pageant moved to Japan from 1968 to 1970, being hosted each year in the same city as the Expo '70. For 1971, it was held in Long Beach again, but since that time it had been held annually in Japan until 2003. Since 2004, it is held in China or Japan. The first winner of the pageant in 1960 was Stella Márquez of Colombia.

Since then, Japan became the host country and the pageant has mostly been held in Japan, around autumn season either in October or November. The pageant is also called "Miss International Beauty". The pageant advocacy is to achieve a world where women can live with positivity, inner strength and individuality. The slogan of Miss International is to "correct understanding of Japan in the international community" and "the realization of world peace through mutual understanding". It has also recently adapted the slogan "Cheer All Women".

The winner of Miss International 2012, Ikumi Yoshimatsu of Japan, was not able to crown her successor due to conflict with a talent agency that threatened her safety and the pageant night itself; instead Miss International 2008, Alejandra Andreu, crowned Bea Santiago of the Philippines as Miss International 2013. The organization was criticized for allegedly asking Yoshimatsu to skip the succession ceremony and "play sick and shut up" in order to avoid a scandal with a Japanese production company whose president was allegedly harassing her. In 2017, Kevin Lilliana Junaedy of Indonesia became the first Muslim woman to win Miss International. 2020 and 2021 edition was the second and third times the pageant has been cancelled since 1966 edition, because of the COVID-19 pandemic and Japanese government banned International events, following the 2020 Summer Olympics postponement.

== Recent titleholders ==
Edition (Year)	Represented	Miss International	National Title	Number of Entrants
64th (2026)				
63rd (2025)	Colombia	Catalina Duque	Señorita Colombia 2024	80
62nd (2024)	Vietnam	Huỳnh Thị Thanh Thủy	Miss Vietnam 2022	71
61st (2023)	Venezuela	Andrea Rubio	Miss Venezuela Internacional 2022	70
60th (2022)	Germany	Jasmin Selberg	Miss International Germany 2022	66

== Gallery of winners ==
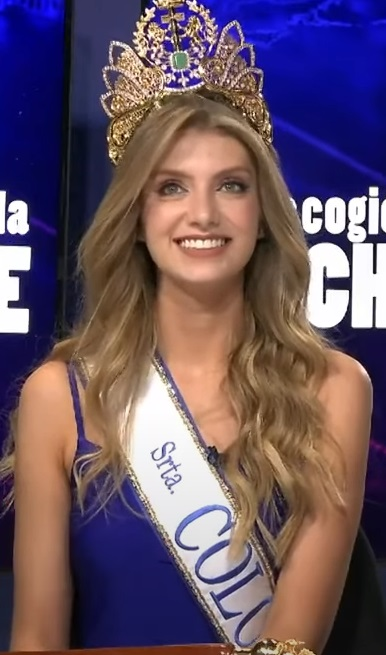
2025, Catalina Duque,
Colombia

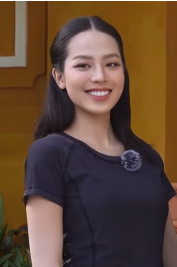
2024, Huỳnh Thị Thanh Thủy,
Vietnam

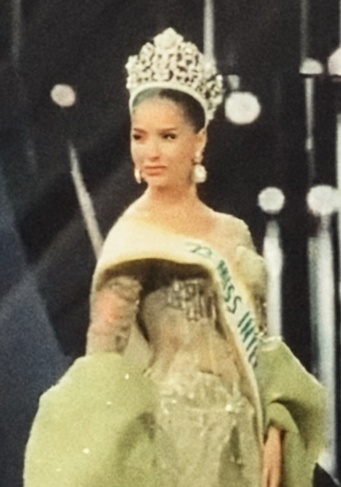
2023, Andrea Rubio,
Venezuela

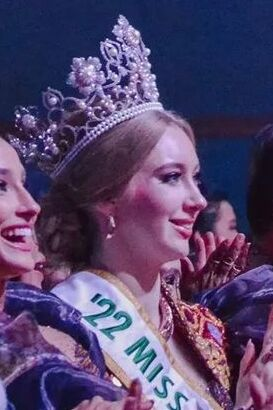
2022, Jasmin Selberg,
Germany

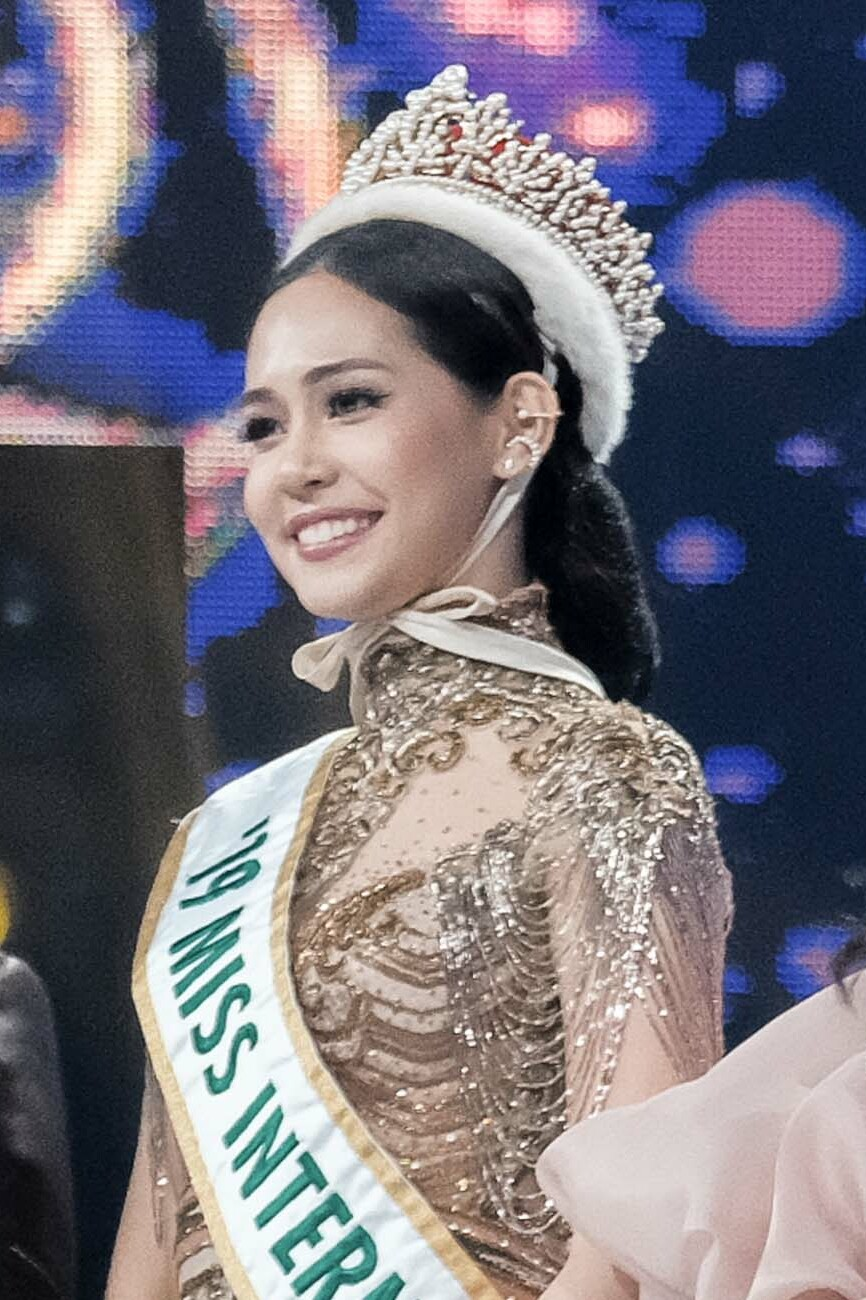
2019, Sireethorn Leearamwat,
Thailand

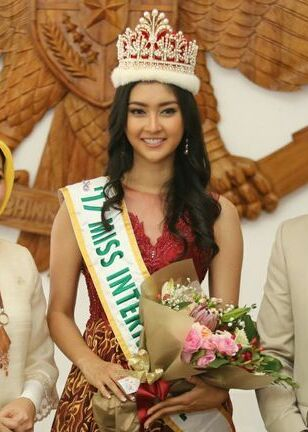
2017, Kevin Lilliana,
Indonesia

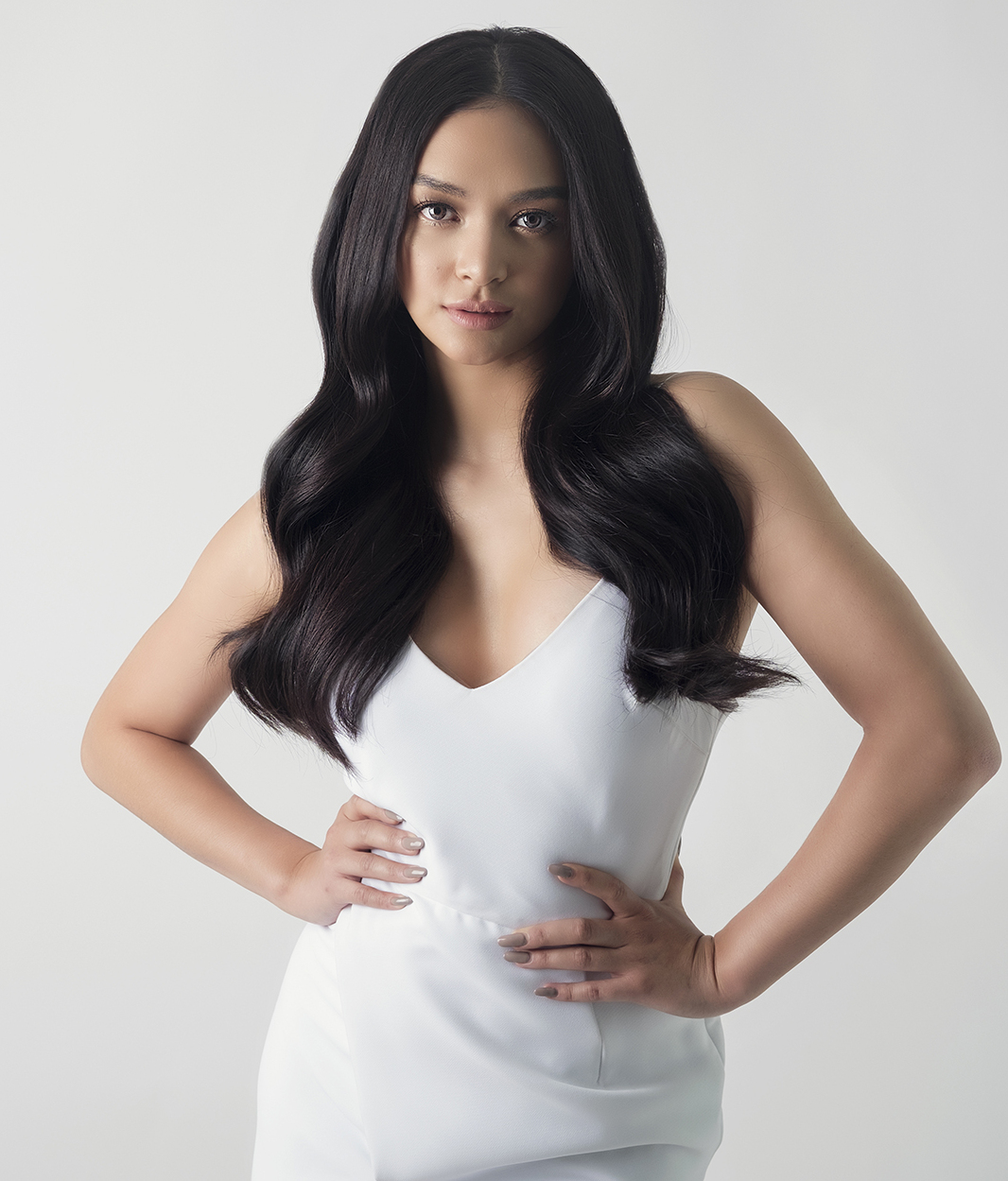
2016, Kylie Verzosa,
Philippines

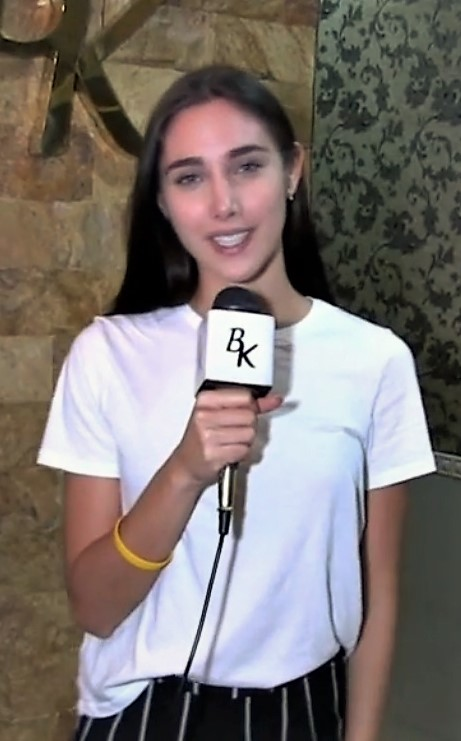
2015, Edymar Martinez,
Venezuela

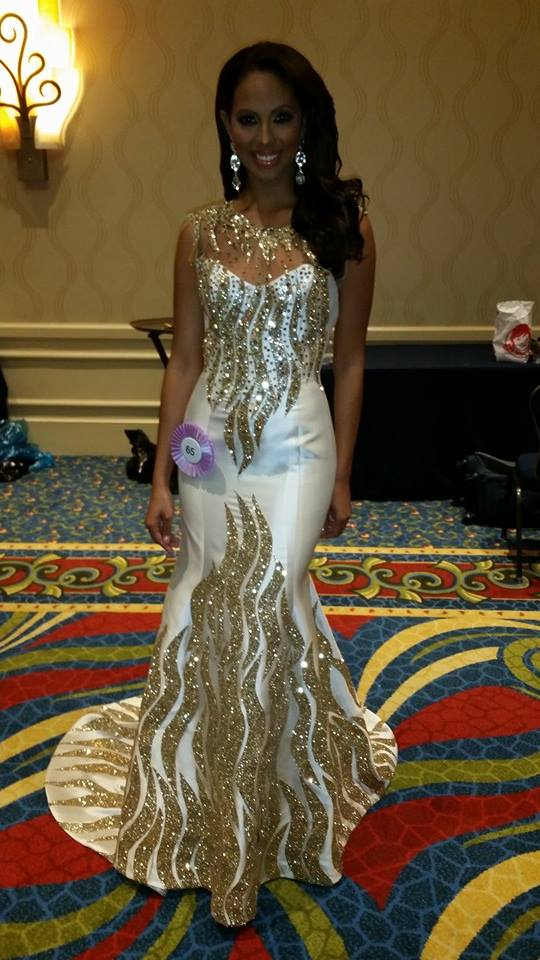
2014, Valerie Hernandez,
Puerto Rico

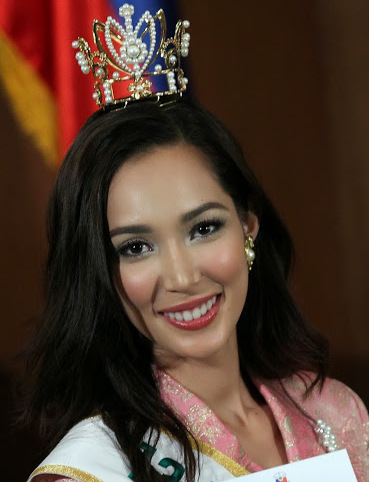
2013, Bea Santiago,
Philippines

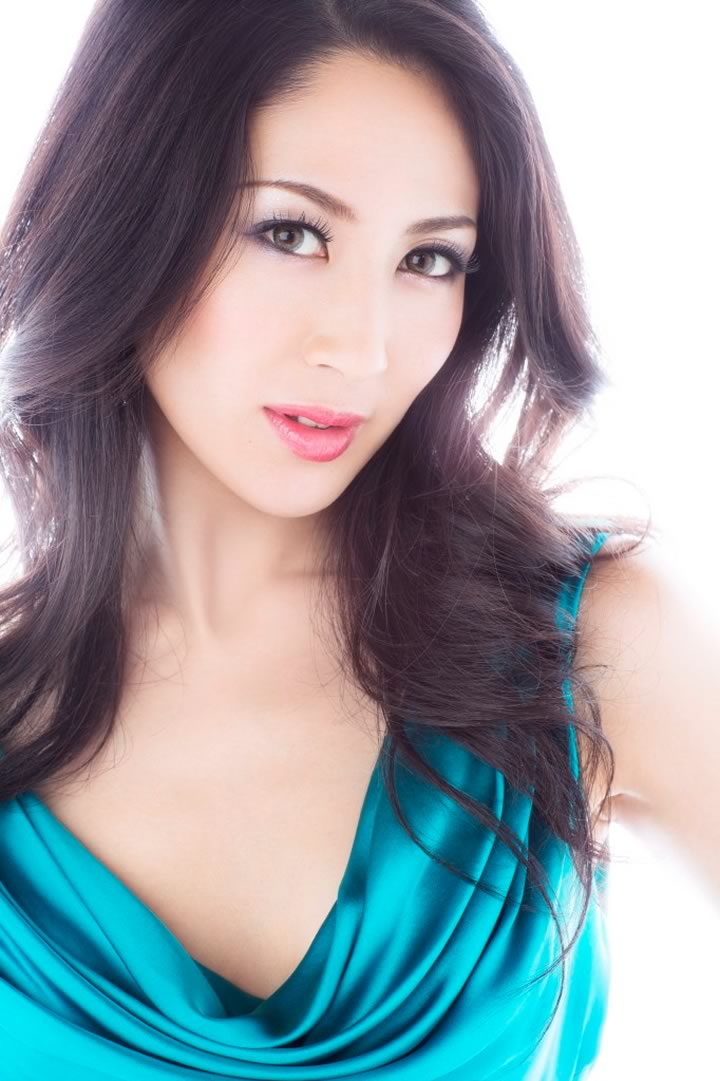
2012, Ikumi Yoshimatsu,
Japan

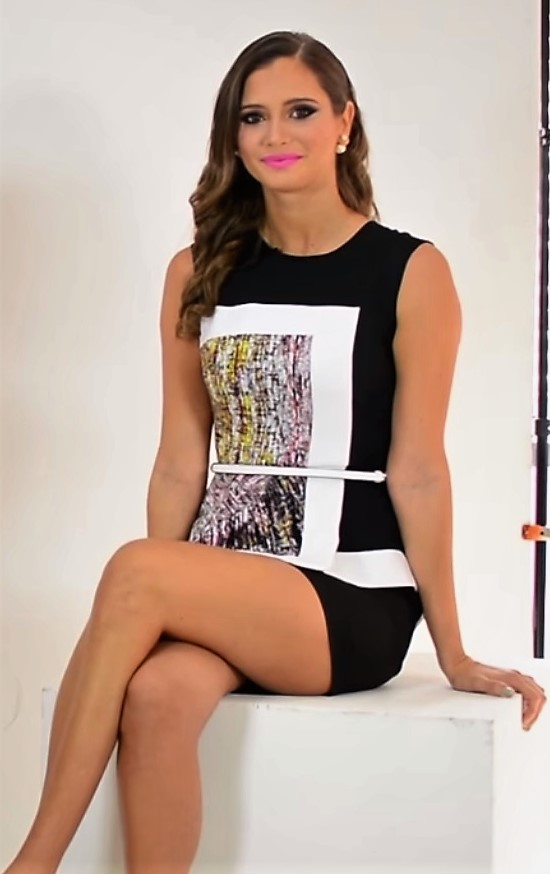
2011, Fernanda Cornejo,
Ecuador

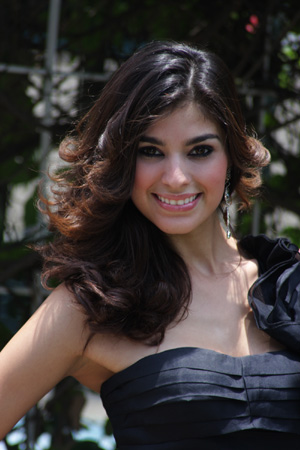
2009, Anagabriela Espinoza,
Mexico

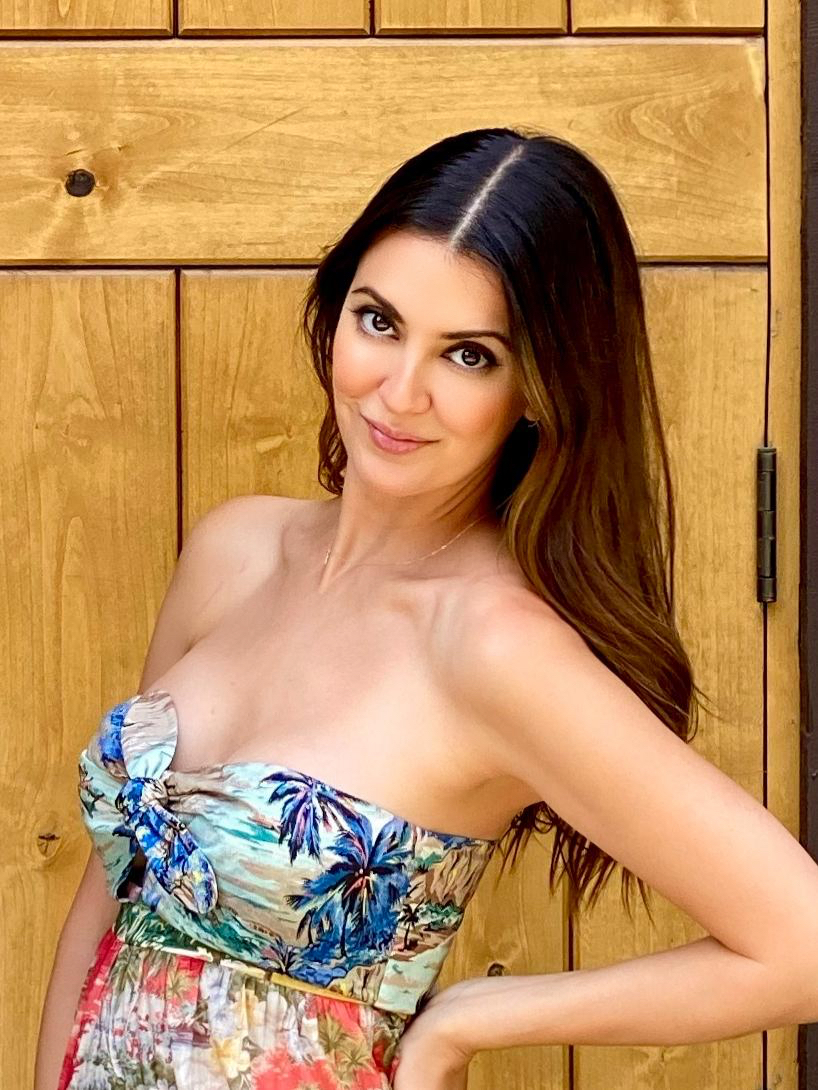
2007, Priscila Perales,
Mexico

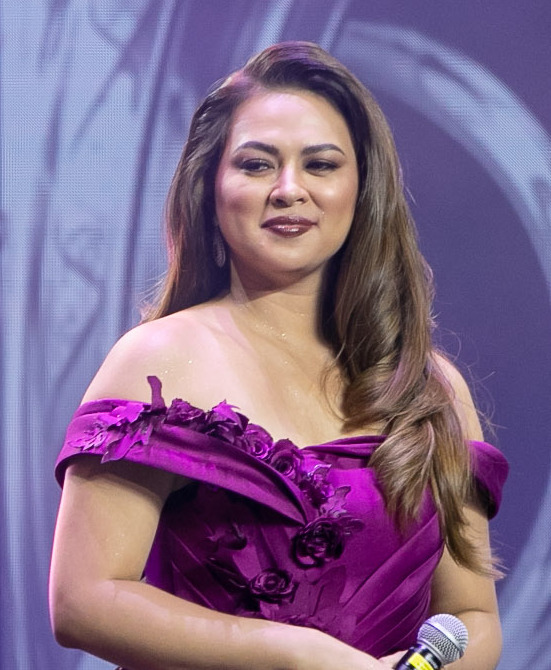
2005, Lara Quigaman,
Philippines

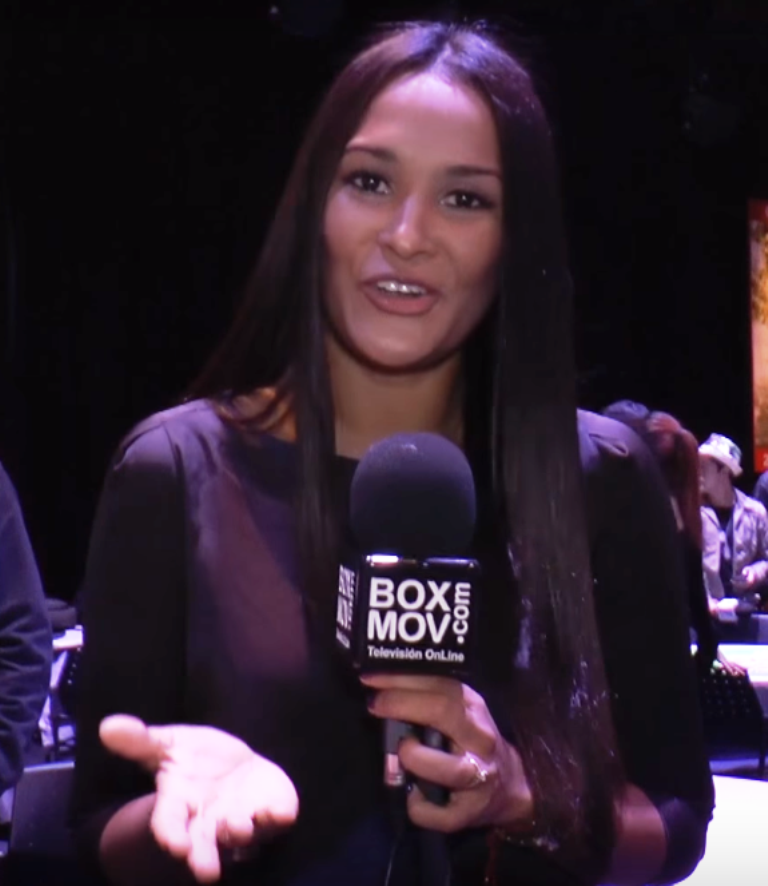
2004, Jeymmy Vargas,
Colombia

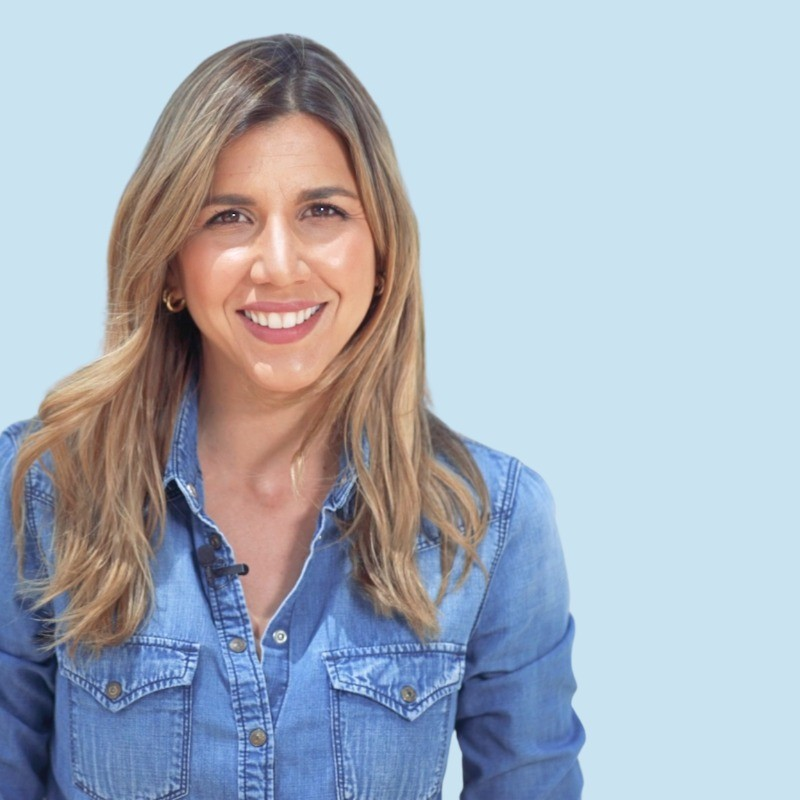
2003, Goizeder Azúa,
Venezuela

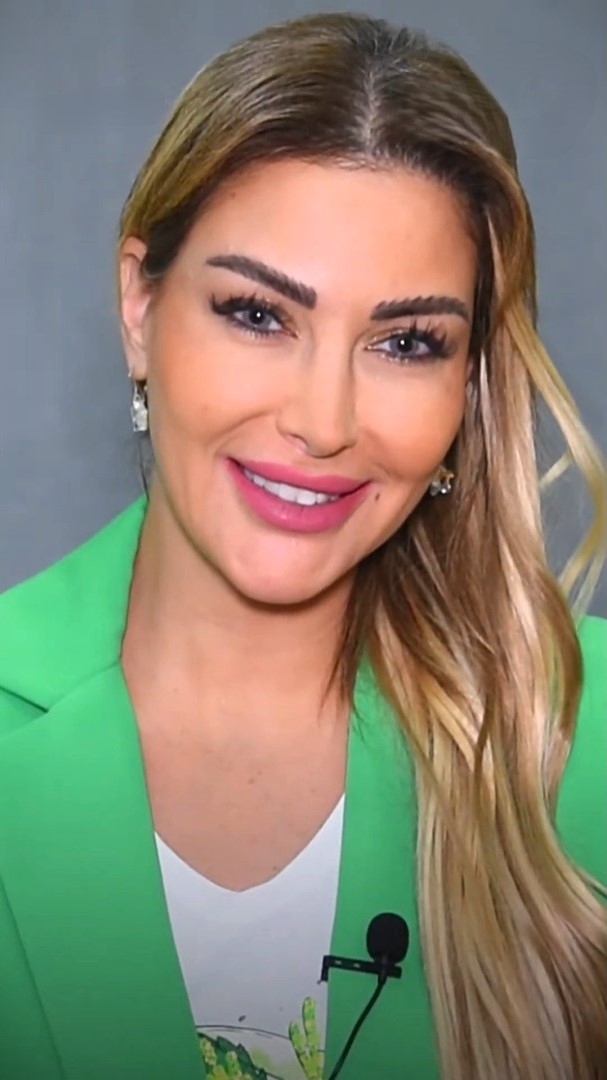
2002, Christina Sawaya,
Lebanon

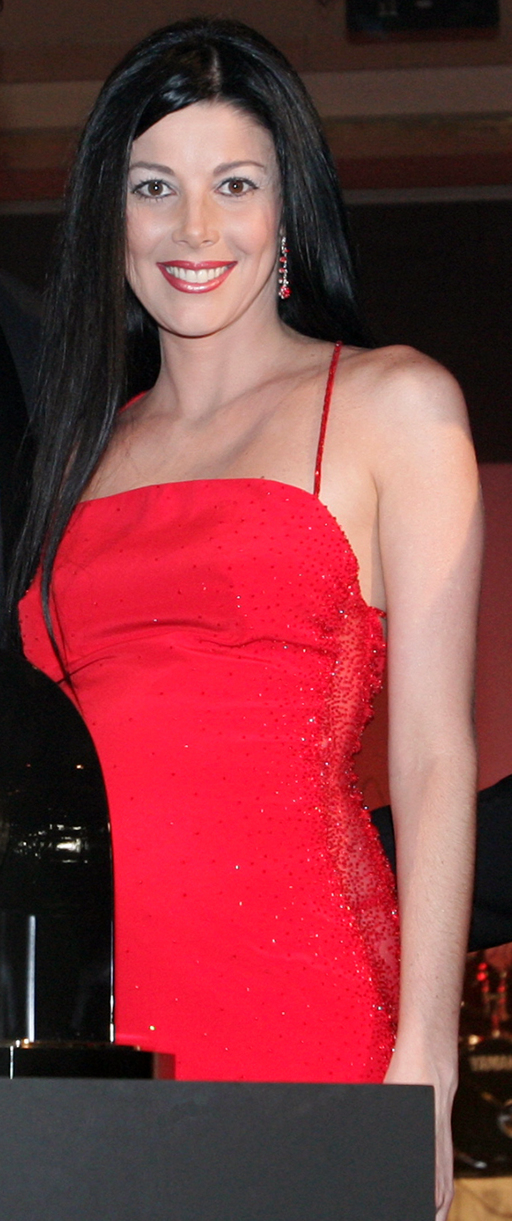
1996, Fernanda Alves,
Portugal

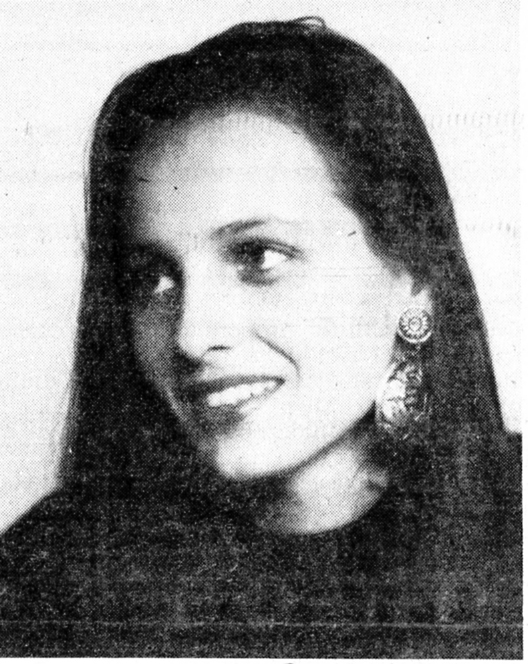
1991, Agnieszka Kotlarska,
Poland

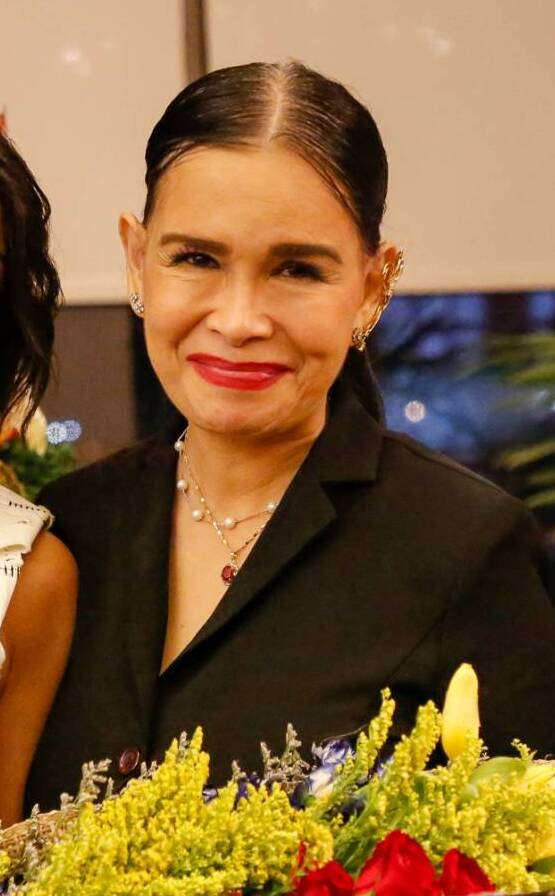
1979, Melanie Marquez,
Philippines

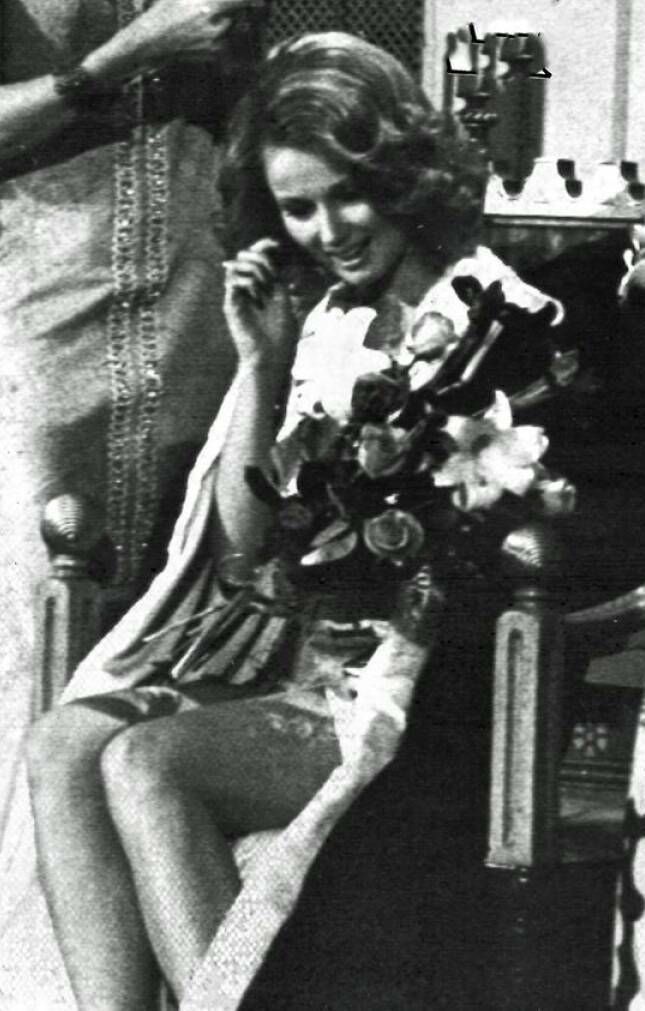
1973, Anneli Björkling,
Finland

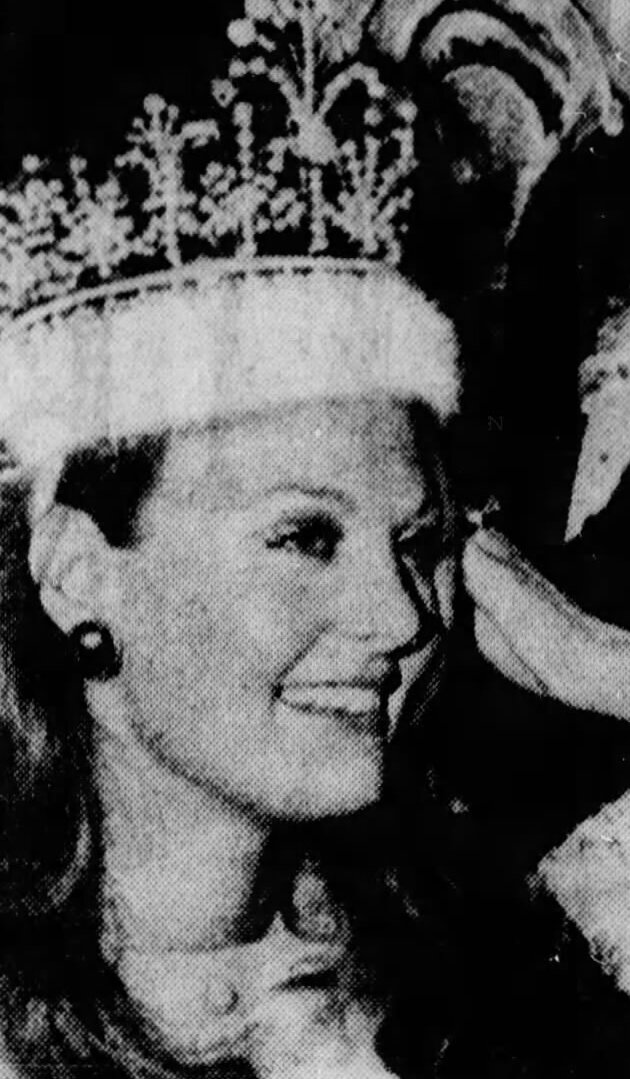
1971, Jane Hansen,
New Zealand

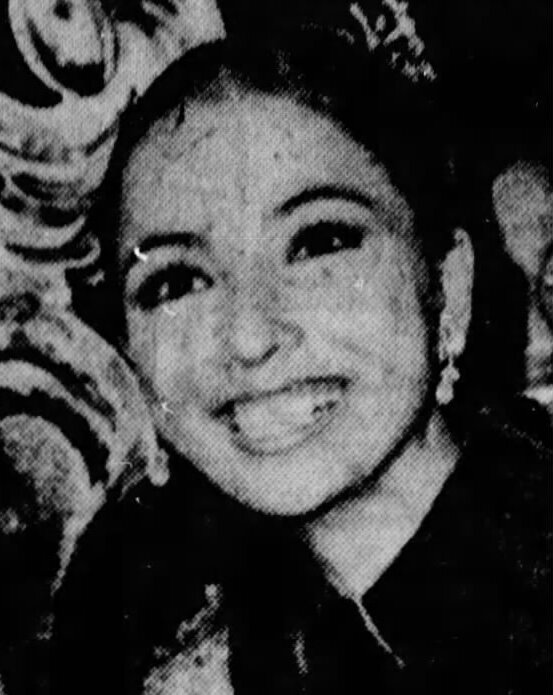
1970, Aurora Pijuan,
Philippines

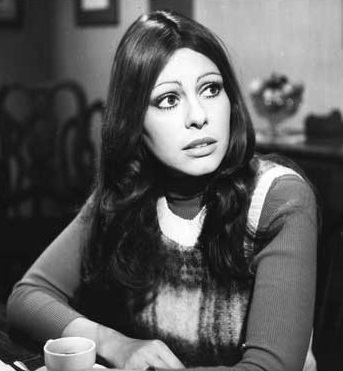
1967, Mirta Massa,
Argentina

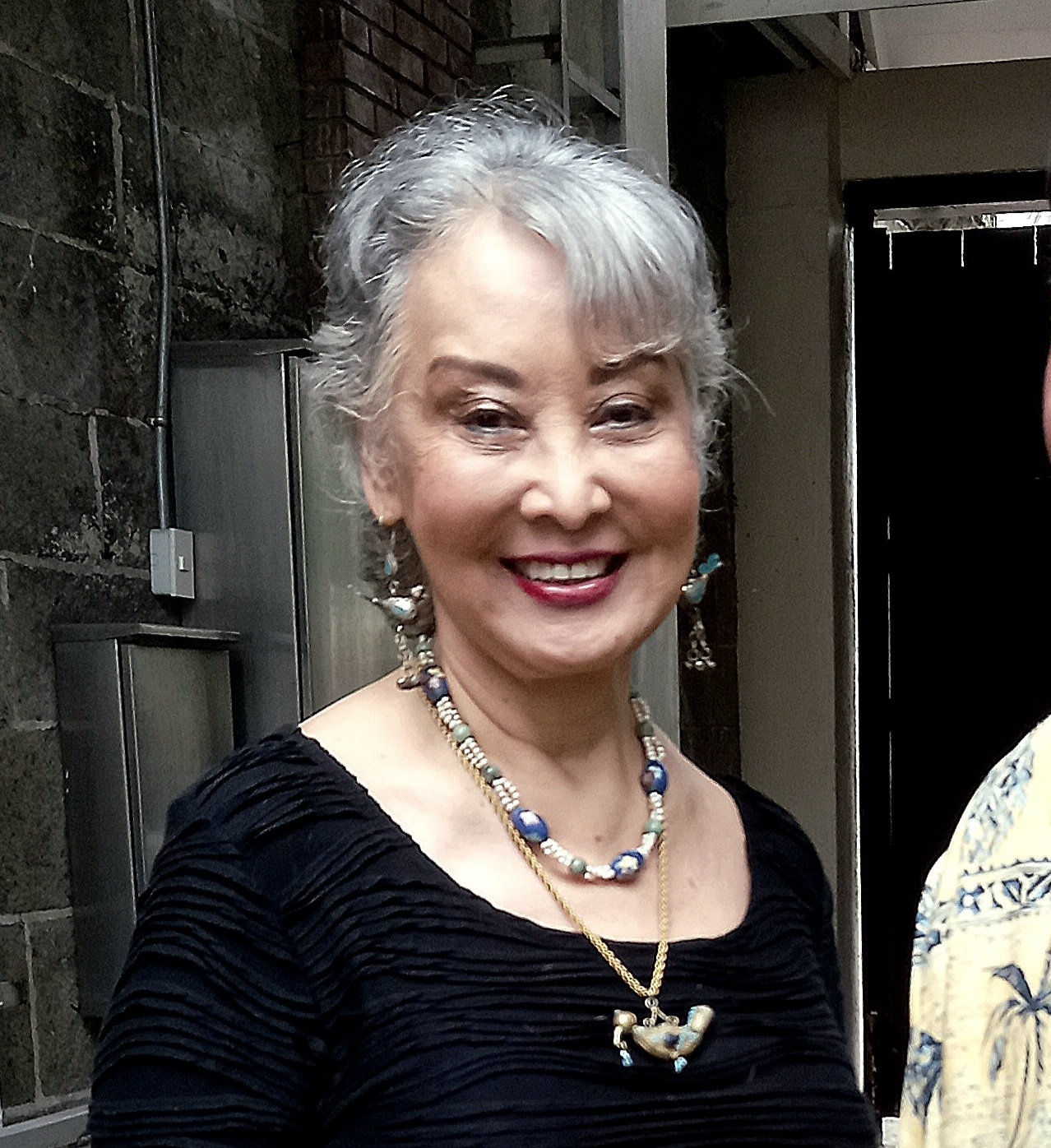
1964, Gemma Cruz,
Philippines

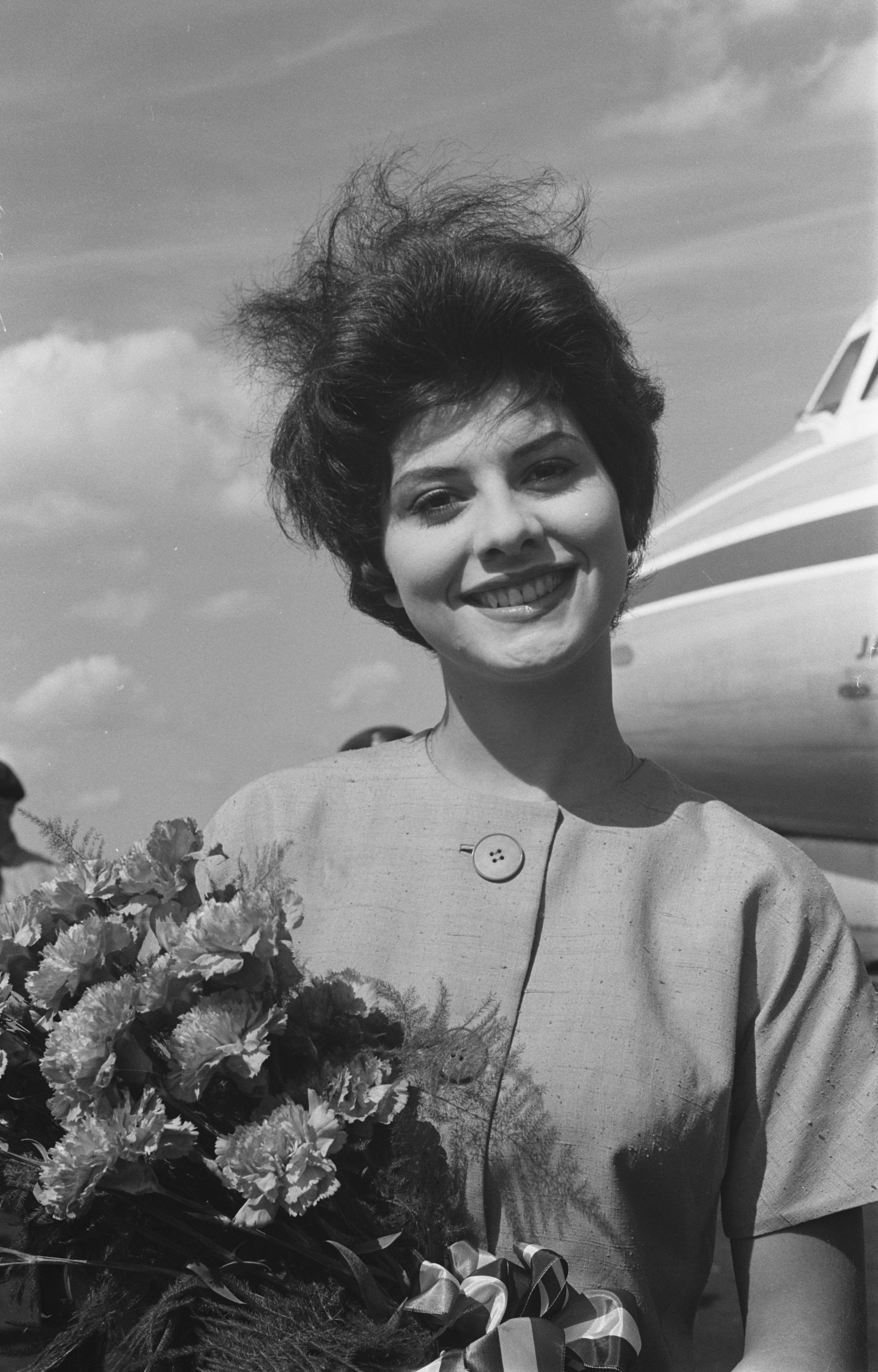
1961, Stanny van Baer,
Netherlands

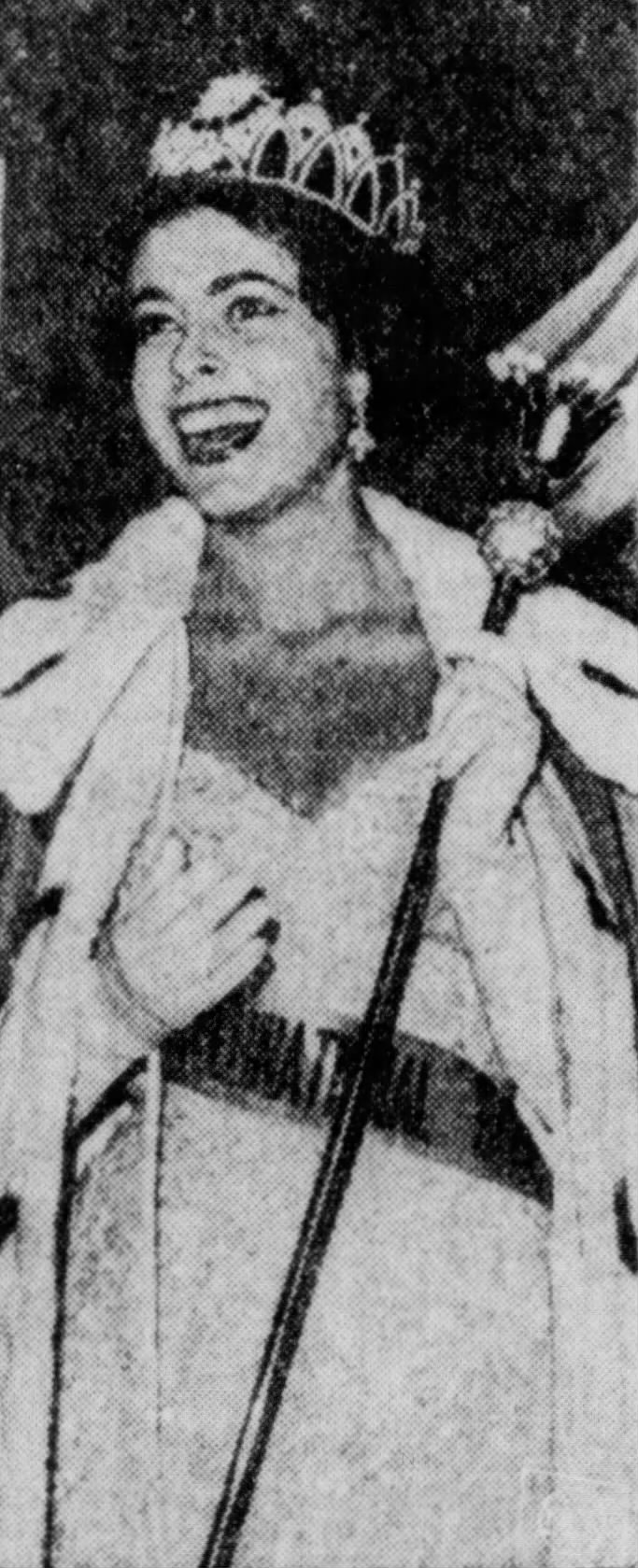
1960, Stella Marquez,
Colombia

== Crowns ==
=== Gallery of Miss International crowns ===
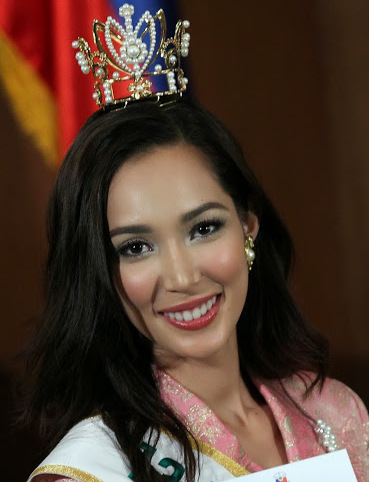
The Couple of Horses Tiara, as worn by Miss International 2013, Bea Santiago of The Philippines.

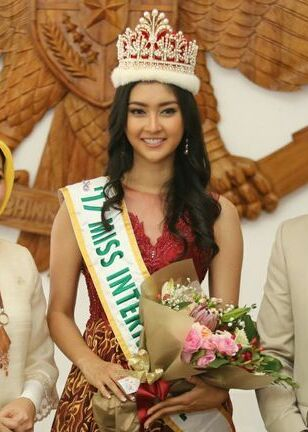
The Mikimoto Crown, as worn by Miss International 2017, Kevin Lilliana of Indonesia.

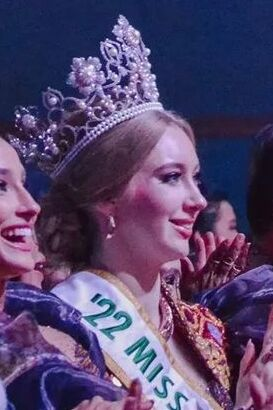
The Long Beach Pearl Crown, as worn by Miss International 2022, Jasmin Selberg of Germany.
- The Long Beach Pearl Crown (2022–present) – This crown was designed by Mrs. Bùi Thị Mỹ Cảnh - founder of Long Beach Pearl, the official crown sponsor of the Miss International Organization. The crown was used from 2022. The crown of Miss International 2022 (Miss International) with the theme of Cherry Blossoms welcoming the spring sun, inspired by the beauty of the cherries blooming under the spring sunshine, is the departure of spring. color, bringing the beauty of faith and positivity. The cherry blossom is a symbol of Japan, representing the spirit, strength, culture and people of Japan. Not only that, the cherry blossoms are also a symbol of intense vitality, a symbol of humility, the desire to live together peacefully, characteristic of youth. The design gathers 333 pure white pearls, symbolizing the flowers that are opening, ready to welcome the rays of spring sunshine. It is also a number that carries the meaning of luck, enthusiasm and longevity. In particular, with the highlight are 3 selected pearls with sizes up to more than 15mm, bringing the beauty of eternal life, sublimation and spread. The Miss International crown is also encrusted with 1960 white gems - symbolizing the first year the Miss International pageant was held. The fusion of feats of craftsmanship with top-notch craftsmanship, Long Beach Pearl has brought a special work for the Miss International contest.
- The Mikimoto Crown (1970–1998; 2015–2019) – This crown was designed by Tomohiro Yamaji for the Mikimoto Company, the official jewel sponsor of the Miss International Organization. It contains 575.31 grams of 14k and 18k gold, 650 South Sea and Akoya pearls, ranging in size from 3 to 18 mm diameter and is valued at US$350,000. The crown was designed for the pageant on Mikimoto Pearl Island in Japan with the Mikimoto crown and tiara being first used for Miss International 2013, which was unveiled by the president of Miss International Akemi Shimomura, like the previous crown edition there are also 4 sets of small tiara's for the runners-up in this crown collection. The crown was retired after Sireethorn Leearamwat of Thailand used the crown in 2019.
- The Couple of Horses Crown (1999–2005; 2007–2014) – This crown was used from 1999–2005; 2007–2014. Same as the current Mikimoto crown, this crown was designed by Tomohiro Yamaji for the Mikimoto Company. The crown has a symbolic design with a couple of horses and 530 South Sea and Akoya pearls, there are 4 sets of small tiara's for the runners-up in this crown collection. It was retired after Valerie Hernandez of Puerto Rico used the crown in 2015.
- The Crystal Crown (2006) – also known as Maki Diamond tiara, this crown was used when Daniela di Giacomo of Venezuela was crowned Miss International 2006. She was the only Miss International titleholder to wear this crown. The crown was valued at US$150,000, was made of an 18 karat combination of white and yellow gold and composed of over 1,000 precious stones.

== See also ==
- List of beauty contests
- Big Four international beauty pageants
