= Sofía Osío =

Colombian model (born 2000)

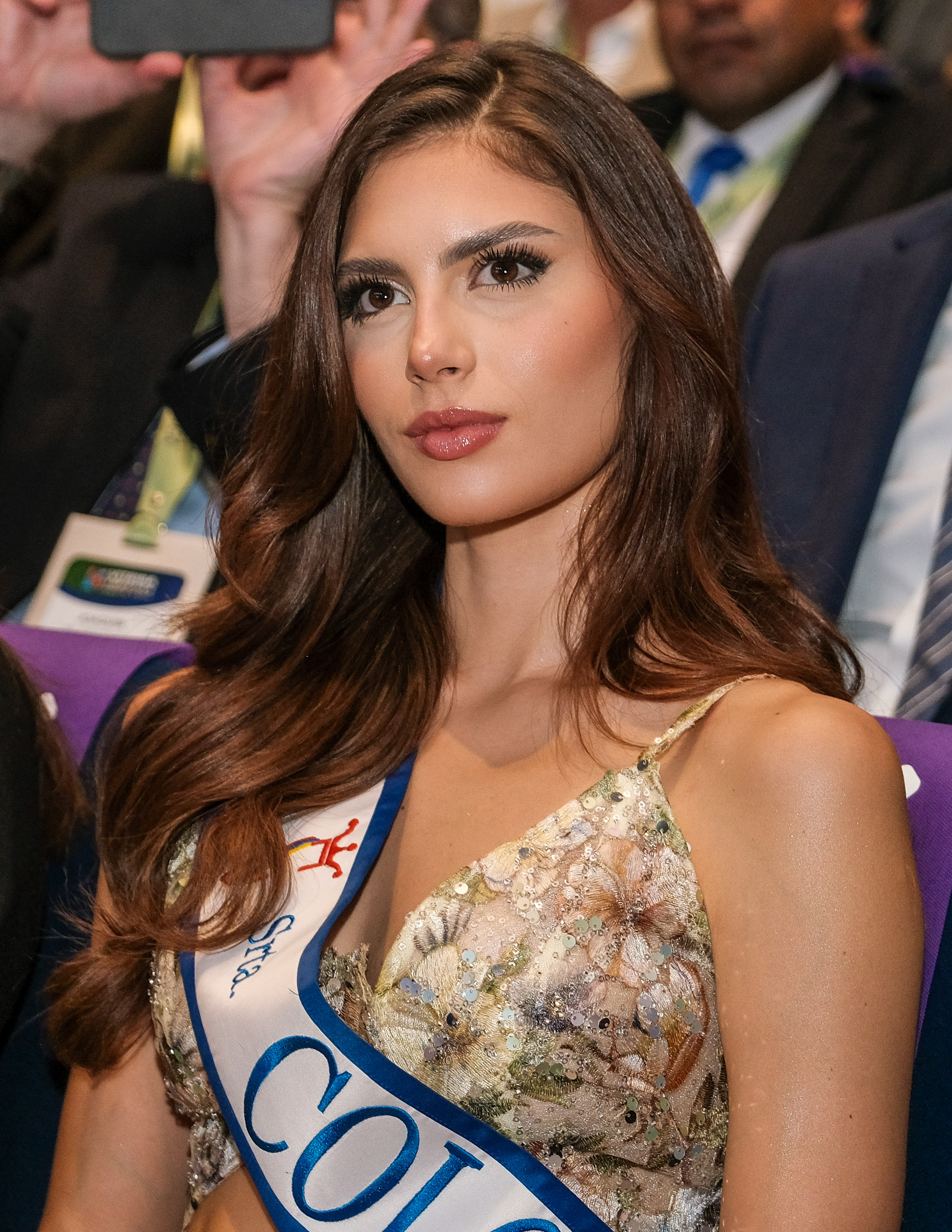
- Osío in 2024
- Born: Sofía Osío Luna; 27 May 2000 (age 26); Barranquilla, Atlántico, Colombia
- Education: Istituto Europeo di Design Barcelona
- Height: 1.77 m (5 ft 10 in)
- Beauty pageant titleholder
- Title: Miss Atlántico 2022; Miss Colombia 2022
- Hair color: Light Brown
- Eye color: Amber
- Major competitions: Señorita Colombia 2022 (Winner); Miss International 2023 (1st Runner-Up)

Sofía Osío Luna (born 27 May 2000) is a Colombian model and beauty pageant titleholder who was crowned Señorita Colombia 2022. She represented Colombia at Miss International 2023 competition an placed 1st Runner Up.

== Early life ==
Sofía was born on 27 May 2000 in Barranquilla, Atlántico, Colombia. She grew up in a family with Italian origins from Lombardy and Spanish Sephardic Jews from Zaragoza. She is the daughter of Alejandro Osío and Susana Luna, and has three siblings. She studied high school at the Colegio Hebreo Unión (Union Hebrew School) a bilingual jew institution located in her city of origin, while her subsequent academic training took place at the Istituto Europeo di Design, located in Barcelona, Catalonia, Spain, where she graduated as a professional in fashion marketing and communication. In addition to her native language, she is fluent in English. From a young age, she has served as a model for different brands nationwide.

== Pageantry ==
=== Señorita Atlántico 2022 ===
Sofía Osío's career in beauty pageants began in June 2022, when she was decreed as the new Miss Atlántico for the next edition of Miss Colombia pageant (Concurso Nacional de Belleza), that would be carried out during the month of November of the same year.

=== Señorita Colombia 2022 ===
In the competition, she stood out as one of the favorite candidates to obtain the title of Miss Colombia, which Valentina Espinosa held at that time. Her performance during the course of the contest allowed her to become the winner on the night of November 13, 2022 in the city of Cartagena as is customary in tradition of the beauty pageant.

Her victory gave its department the title number 12 in the history of the Miss Colombia pageant, a distinction that the department hadn't obtained since Paulina Vega in 2013.

=== Miss International 2023 ===
She represented Colombia at Miss International 2023 in Tokyo, Japan where she placed 1st Runner-Up.

Awards and achievements
Preceded by (Cape Verde) Stephany Amado	Miss International 1st Runner-Up; 2023	Succeeded by (Bolivia) Camila Roca
Preceded by Valentina Espinosa	Miss Colombia; 2022	Succeeded by Catalina Duque Abréu
Preceded by Natalia López	Miss Colombia International; 2023	Succeeded by Juanita Urrea
Preceded by Valerie Sue	Miss Atlántico; 2022	Succeeded by Sherin Marie Ariza
