= EAFIT University =

Private Colombian university located in Medellín

Universidad EAFIT
- Escuela de Administración y Finanzas e Instituto Tecnológico
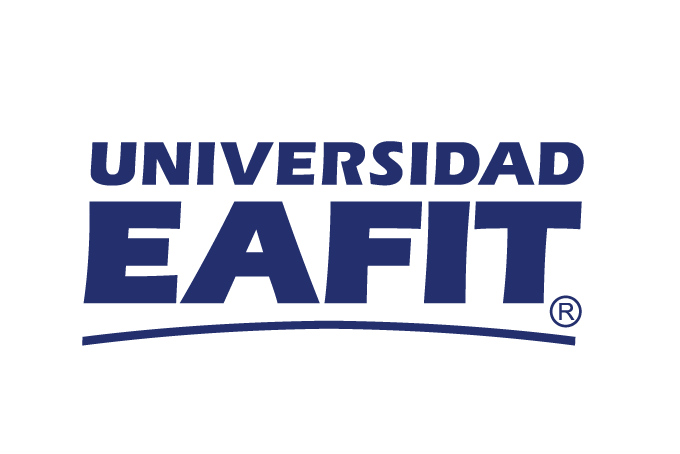
- Motto: Inspira Crea Transforma (Spanish)
- Motto in English: Inspire Create Transform
- Type: Private
- Established: 1960
- Principal: Claudia Restrepo
- Students: 11,970
- Undergraduates: 9,500
- Postgraduates: 2,200
- Location: Carrera 49 N° 7 Sur - 50, Medellín, Antioquia, Colombia; 6°11′59.04″N 75°34′43.27″W
- Campus: Urban
- Website: www.eafit.edu.co

EAFIT University (originally the acronym in Spanish: Escuela de Administración, Finanzas e Instituto Tecnológico, "School of Administration, Finance and Technological Institute") is a private Colombian university located in Medellín offering 23 undergraduate programs, 70 specializations, 34 masters, and six doctoral programs. The university offers degrees in various disciplines through its schools of Management, Engineering, Law, Finance and Economics, Science, and Humanities. Universidad EAFIT was approved by the Colombian Ministry of Education on May 6, 1971. It has three additional branches in Bogotá, Pereira, and Rionegro.

The university has received the Ministry of National Education's institutional high-quality accreditation twice in a row. This makes it the first Colombian university to earn that recognition. This accreditation is valid through the end of 2026.

== Features and Location ==
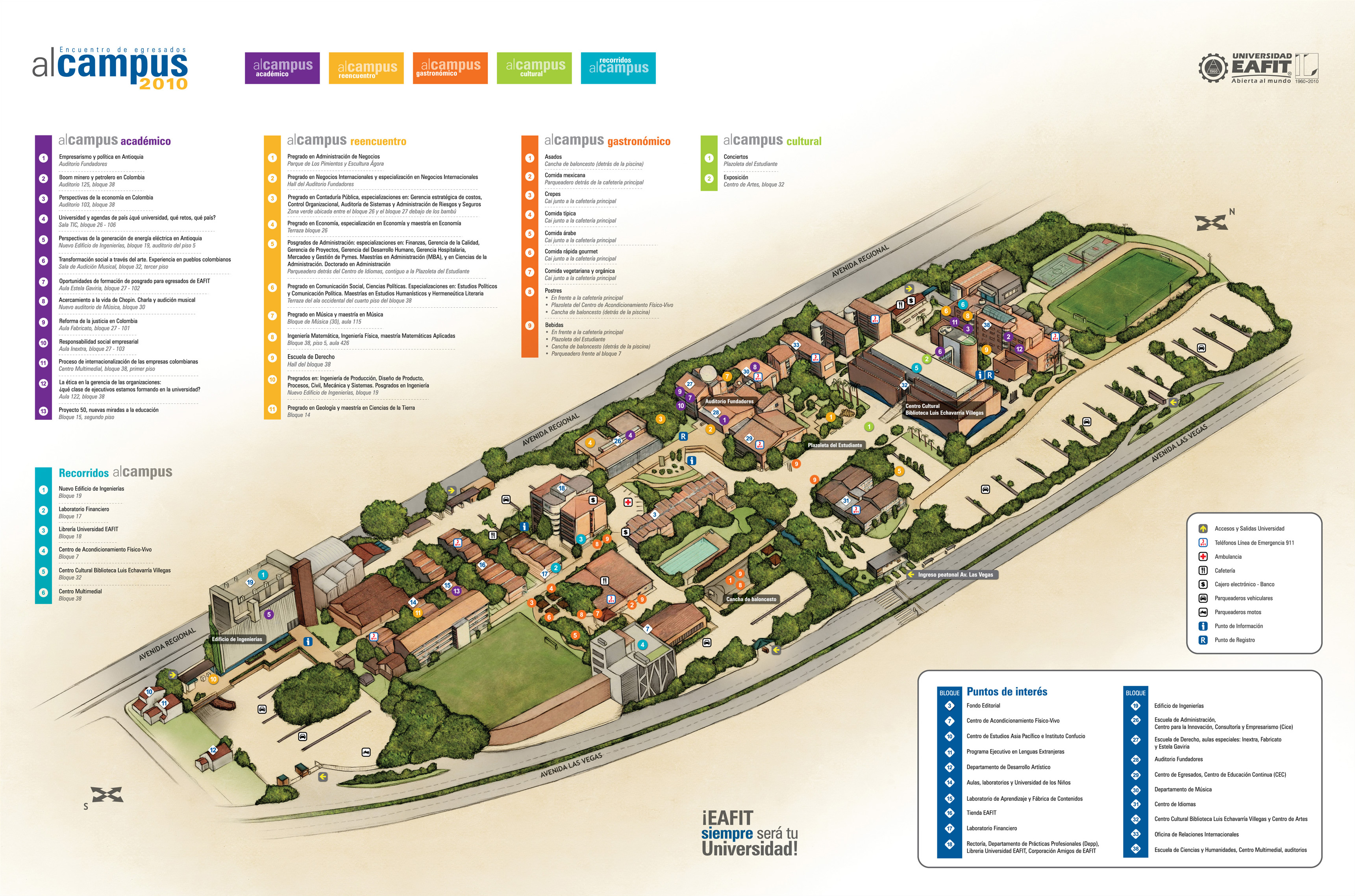
EAFIT University in Medellín, Colombia.

EAFIT is approved and recognized by the National Education Ministry, based on act 759 from May 6 of 1971. The university's main campus is located in El Poblado, Medellín. It has additional campuses in Bogotá, Pereira and Llanogrande Rionegro (Antioquia).

It is considered one of the top tier universities in Colombia by QS Rankings and MIDE.

Its current principal is Claudia Restrepo.

== History ==
Universidad EAFIT was founded in 1960 by a group of entrepreneurs in Medellín. Its main goal was to educate professionals who would address new challenges in management, finance, and technology. EAFIT started as a "School of Management and Finance." Two-year technological programs were offered when its Institute of Technology division was created. The institution organized itself as a university in 1975, when it started offering five-year programs in engineering.

Professor Javier Toro Martínez was the first rector with a group of 59 students in the school of Business Administration. The Textile Technology, Industrial Programming and Mechanic faculties were opened in 1962. In 1996 EAFIT opened its first branch outside of Medellín in Llanogrande, Rionegro, offering degrees in Business Administration, Civil Engineering, and Systems Engineering.

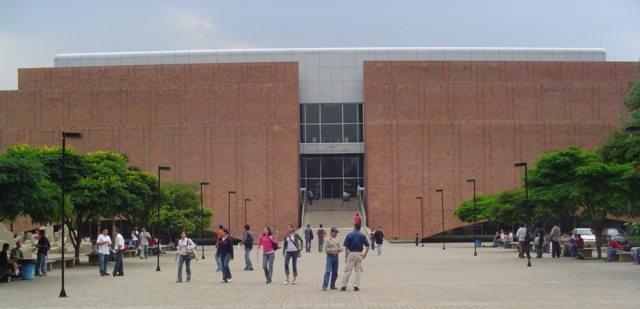
Biblioteca Luis Echavarría Villegas: EAFIT library.

The School of Social Sciences and Humanities was opened in 1997, adding new disciplines to an educational center that had been primarily dedicated to Economics. The subsequent creation of the School of Music increased the number of programs in the Arts and Sciences. The Product Design Engineering and Law faculties were then created in 1999. This was followed by the creation of the Mathematics Engineering undergraduate program in 2002, the first of its kind in Colombia. Three new departments were added in 2004: Engineering Physics, Social Communication and Political Science. That same year the administration made the decision to rename the campus as "Park University" (Universidad Parque), adding ecological grounds that include a large lake, woods, and an unpaved parking area. Dr. Juan Luis Mejía's goal was to integrate the university with the urban background of the city, while at the same time improving and protecting its natural environment. The project was awarded the Premio Lápiz de Acero (Steel Pen Award) from the Proyecto Diseño magazine of Medellín in the "Public Spaces" category.

Recently added disciplines include majors in Psychology and Marketing, both established in 2011. Future offerings include programs in Biology and Sound Engineering.

=== High Quality of Institutional Accreditation ===
Since the process of accreditation started in Colombia in 2003, only 15 Colombian universities have earned a high quality accreditation. EAFIT was given its first institutional accreditation for a period of six years in 2003. In March 2010, that accreditation was renewed for eight years. All of its undergraduate programs are accredited as "high quality." Five of EAFIT's graduate programs earned a high quality accreditation.

== Academics ==
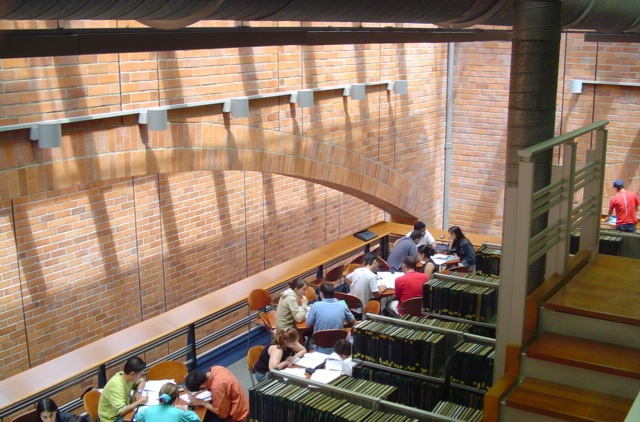
Biblioteca Luis Echavarría Villegas from inside.

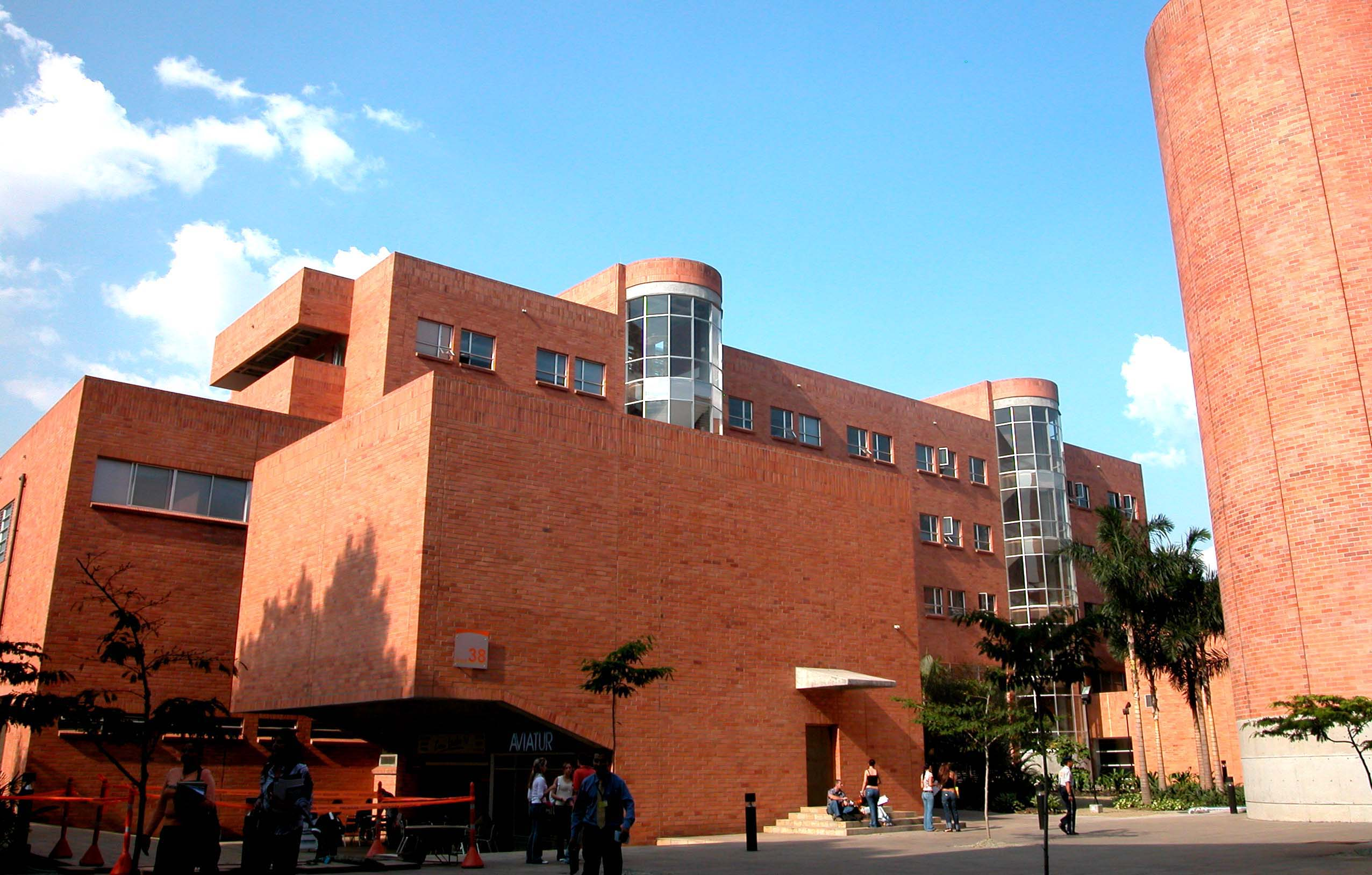
Building 38, housing the School of Science and Humanities.

Universidad EAFIT offers 21 undergraduate programs, which are divided in six schools.

=== School of Management ===
- Business Administration
- International Business
- Public Accounting
- Marketing

=== School of Applied Sciences and Engineering ===
- Biology
- Engineering Mathematics
- Engineering Physics
- Geology
- Civil Engineering
- Mechanical Engineering
- Process Engineering
- Production Engineering
- Computer Science
- Agronomic Engineering
- Urban and Habitat Design

=== School of Finance, Economics and Government ===
- Economics
- Finances
- Political Science

=== School of Arts and Humanities ===
- Music
- Communication Studies
- Literature
- Psychology

=== School of Law ===
- Law

== Research Centers ==
=== Center for Urban and Environmental Studies - urbam EAFIT ===
The Center for Urban and Environmental Studies, also known as urbam EAFIT, was funded in 2010 by EAFIT's principal of that time, Juan Luis Mejia Arango, in cooperation with other city personalities like Alejandro Echeverri, Jorge Giraldo and Michel Hermelin. From that time, it has turned into a referent in the areas of urban planning, sustainable occupancy and social projection. Besides that, since the opening of the Master's program in Urban and Environmental Processes, urbam also became an academic department of EAFIT. It now manages a Bachelor's degree in Urban and Habitat Design, part of the School of Applied Sciences and Engineering.

In the year 2021, urbam's official research group was qualified as top-tier (A1) in the research index of the Ministry of Science.

== Affiliated Programs ==
Among the university's many organizations and clubs is the "100K Strong" initiative, which makes EAFIT the only institution of higher education in Colombia that takes part in this program created by U.S. president Barack Obama. The university also has a summer week-long camp for kids ages 3–12.

- National
  - Asociación Colombiana de Universidades (ASCUN).
  - Colombian International Cooperation Network for University Education.
  - Universia College Portal .
- International
  - Abroad Study program and academic interchange.
  - ALFA Program (Latin America – Academic training).
  - Latin American and Caribbean University Network of Non-Stop Education.
  - 100.000 Strong in the Americas.
