= Sabanalarga, Casanare =

Coordinates: 4.85361°N 73.0431°W

- Municipality and town
- Flag Coat of arms

- Location of the municipality and town of Sabanalarga, Casanare in the Casanare Department of Colombia.
- Coordinates: 4º51'13N 73º02'23O
- Country: Colombia
- Department: Casanare Department

Area
  - Total: 269.4 km^{2} (104.0 sq mi)
- Time zone: UTC-5 (Colombia Standard Time)
- Website: http://www.sabanalarga-casanare.gov.co/

Sabanalarga (Spanish pronunciation: [saβanaˈlaɾɣa]) is a town and municipality in the Department of Casanare, Colombia.

== Climate ==
Sabanalarga has a very wet tropical monsoon climate (Am).

Climate data for Sabanalarga
Month	Jan	Feb	Mar	Apr	May	Jun	Jul	Aug	Sep	Oct	Nov	Dec	Year
Mean daily maximum °C (°F)	31.8 (89.2)	32.2 (90.0)	31.7 (89.1)	30.2 (86.4)	29.4 (84.9)	28.2 (82.8)	28.6 (83.5)	28.9 (84.0)	29.6 (85.3)	29.9 (85.8)	30.3 (86.5)	30.7 (87.3)	30.1 (86.2)
Daily mean °C (°F)	25.9 (78.6)	26.4 (79.5)	26.3 (79.3)	25.5 (77.9)	24.8 (76.6)	24.1 (75.4)	24.1 (75.4)	24.3 (75.7)	24.7 (76.5)	25.0 (77.0)	25.3 (77.5)	25.4 (77.7)	25.1 (77.3)
Mean daily minimum °C (°F)	20.0 (68.0)	20.6 (69.1)	20.9 (69.6)	20.8 (69.4)	20.3 (68.5)	20.0 (68.0)	19.7 (67.5)	19.8 (67.6)	19.9 (67.8)	20.1 (68.2)	20.3 (68.5)	20.1 (68.2)	20.2 (68.4)
Average rainfall mm (inches)	34.4 (1.35)	80.5 (3.17)	148.0 (5.83)	418.9 (16.49)	629.7 (24.79)	703.9 (27.71)	714.7 (28.14)	584.2 (23.00)	505.8 (19.91)	452.1 (17.80)	300.8 (11.84)	129.2 (5.09)	4,702.2 (185.12)
Average rainy days	2	3	5	14	20	21	21	19	17	16	13	6	157
Source 1:
Source 2:
