= List of Lebanese Colombians =

This is a list of notable Lebanese Colombian individuals, including those born in Colombia of Lebanese ancestry and people of Lebanese and Colombian dual nationality who have lived in Colombia.

== Academia ==
- Elías Bechara Zainúm (1920–2013), educator, philanthropist, and chemist.

== Beauty pageant contestants ==
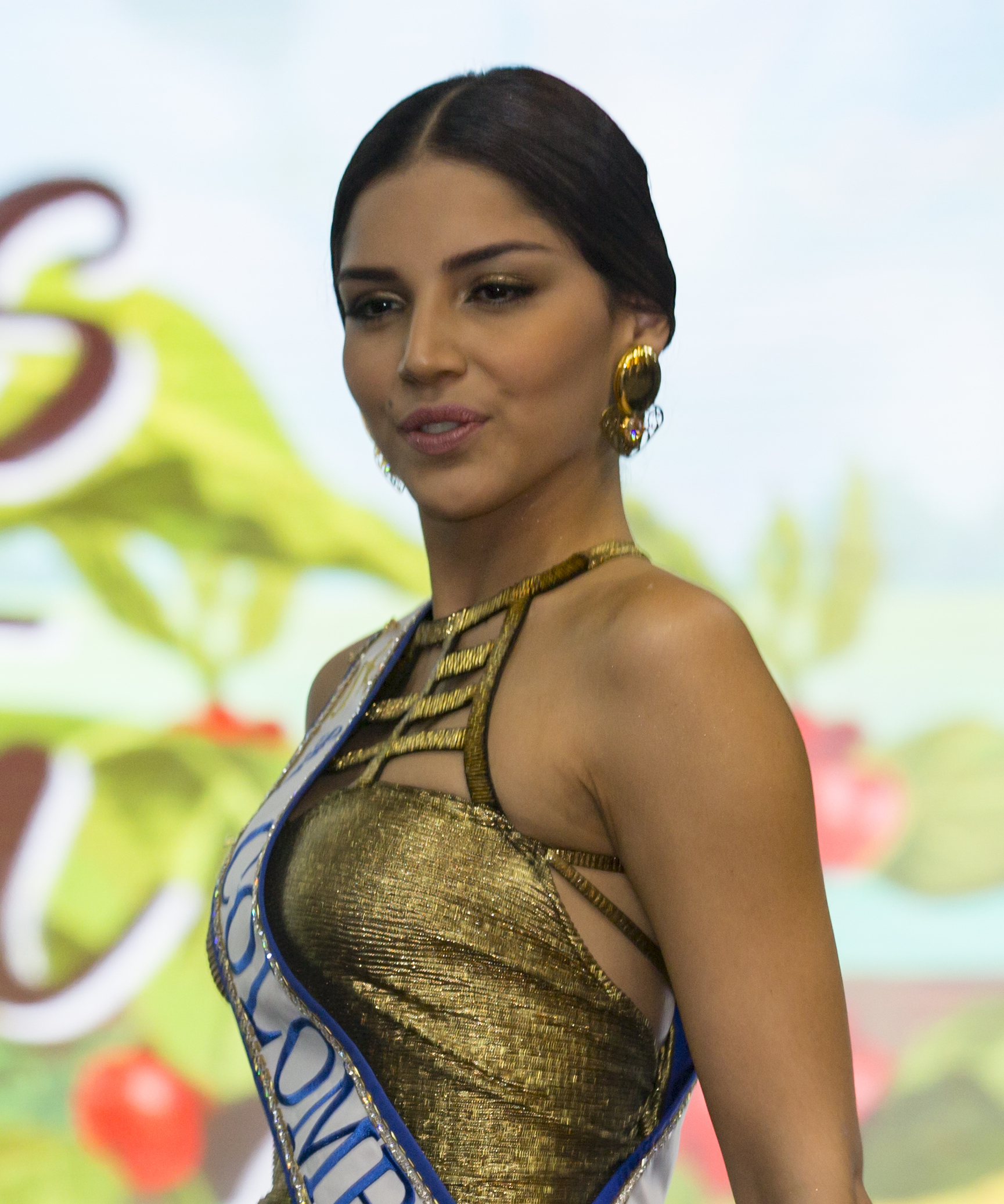
Laura González (2017)

- Yamile Dajud (born 1996), Miss Sucre 2021
- Valerie Domínguez (born 1981), Miss Colombia 2005
- Laura González (born 1995), Miss Colombia 2017
- Juliana Habib (born 2000), Miss Córdoba 2021
- Gabriela Tafur (born 1995), Miss Colombia 2019
- Paola Turbay (born 1970), Miss Colombia 1991
- Taliana Vargas (born 1987), Miss Colombia 2008

== Entertainment ==
- Felipe Aljure, film director
- Carolina Guerra (born 1987), actress, model, singer, and presenter
- Majida Issa (born 1981), actress
- Javier Jattin (born 1983), actor and model
- John Leguizamo (born 1960 or 1964), Colombian-American actor
- Juan Devis, producer and executive
- Veronica Orozco (born 1979), actress and singer

== Journalism ==
- Leila Cobo, novelist, pianist, television show host, and music journalist for Billboard magazine
- Andrea Serna (born 1977), RCN presenter and model
- Diana Turbay (1950–1991), journalist and daughter of Julio César Turbay Ayala

== Medicine ==
- Salomón Hakim (1922–2011), neurosurgeon

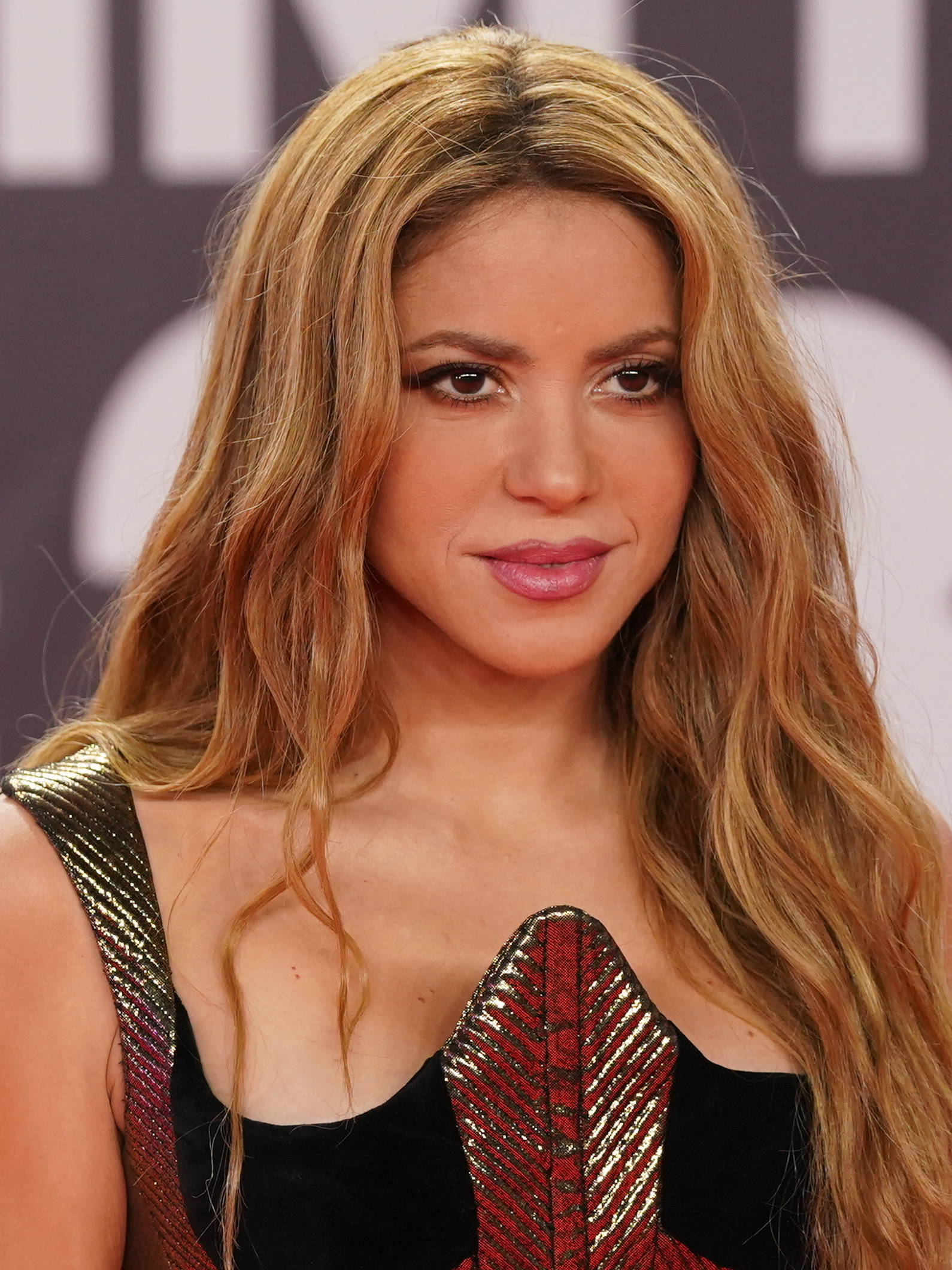
Shakira (2023)

== Music ==
- Naty Botero (born 1980), model and singer
- Silvestre Dangond (born 1980), singer
- Shakira (born 1977), singer
- Soraya (1969–2006), Colombian-American singer-songwriter

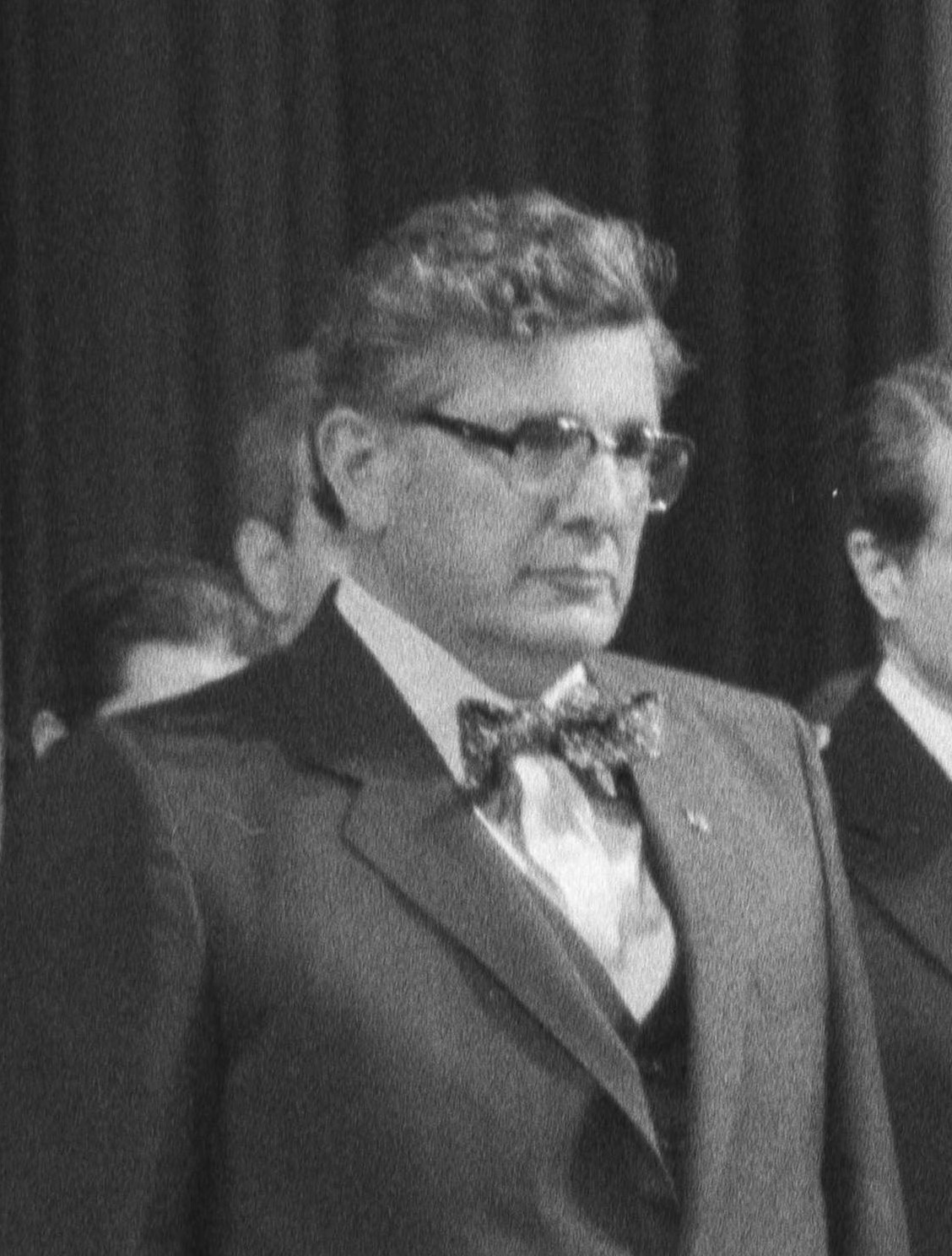
Julio César Turbay Ayala (1979)

== Politics ==
- Dumar Aljure (1928–1968), guerilla and political leader
- Edwin Besaile (born 1980), 45th governor of Córdoba
- Jairo Clopatofsky (born 1961), senator
- Álvaro Fayad (1946–1986), guerilla leader
- Yannai Kadamani (born 1993), Minister of Culture (2025–present)
- José David Name (born 1968), senator
- José Name Terán (1936–2011), senator
- Julio César Turbay Ayala (1916– 2005), 25th president of Colombia
- Nydia Quintero Turbay (1932-2025), First Lady of Colombia
- Julio César Turbay Quintero (born 1949), lawyer and politician
- Claudia Turbay (born 1952), diplomat and journalist
- Gabriel Turbay (1901–1947), senator, representative, minister, and ambassador
- Zulema Jattin (born 1969), former senator and representative for Córdoba

== Sports ==
- Robert Farah (born 1987), tennis player
- Mauricio Hadad (born 1971), former tennis player
- Faryd Mondragón (born 1971), professional football player
- Fuad Reveiz (born 1963), former American football player
- Alberto Rujana (born 1955), professional football manager

== Literature and art ==
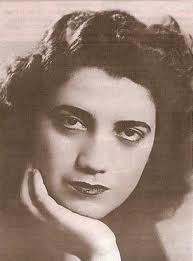
Meira Delmar

- Meira Delmar (1922–2009), poet
- Soad Louis Lakah (1952–2020), writer and poet
