= María Vengoechea =

Colombian beauty pageant titleholder

Maria Vengoechea
- Born: Maria Alejandra Vengoechea Cárcamo; Cartagena, Bolivar, Colombia
- Education: University of the North (BDE)
- Height: 1.73 m (5 ft 8 in)
- Beauty pageant titleholder
- Title: Miss Colombia International 2019
- Hair color: Brown
- Eye color: Brown
- Major competitions: Señorita Colombia 2018 (2nd Runner-Up); Miss International 2019; (3rd Runner-Up); Reina Hispanoamericana 2021; (1st Runner-Up)

Maria Alejandra Vengoechea Cárcamo is a Colombian lawyer, model and beauty pageant titleholder who participated in Señorita Colombia 2018, where she won the title of Primera Princesa (2nd runner-up). She represented Colombia at Miss International 2019 and placed 3rd runner-up. Vengoechea also represented the country at Reina Hispanoamerciana 2021 and placed 1st runner-up.

== Early life ==
María Alejandra was born on in Cartagena de Indias, Bolívar, although as a child her family settled in the city of Barranquilla, Atlántico where her father is from. She studied law at the University of the North in Barranquilla. In addition to Spanish, she is fluent in English.

== Pageantry ==
=== Señorita Atlántico 2018-2019 ===
Vengoechea competed for the title Señorita Atlántico in her regional, being the winner.

=== Señorita Colombia 2018-2019 ===
On November 12, 2018, the final of Señorita Colombia was held in the city of Cartagena de Indias, where María Alejandra achieved the title of Primera Princesa, with Gabriela Tafur being the winner of the contest.

=== Miss International 2019 ===
Later, in June 2019, she was officially designated as Miss Colombia International to represent the nation in the Miss International 2019 beauty pageant to be held in November of that same year, after the resignation of Laura Olascuaga (Virreina Nacional) from her title.

On November 12, 2019, at the Municipal Hall of the Tokyo Dome, Tokyo, Japan, the final of Miss International was held, where candidates from 82 countries competed for the title. At the end of the event, Vengoechea obtained the position of 3rd runner-up.

=== Reina Hispanoamericana 2021 ===
On September 3, 2021, María Alejandra was appointed by the Miss Colombia Pageant to represent her country in Reina Hispanoamericana 2021 to be held in Santa Cruz, Bolivia.

On October 30, 2021, the final of the Reina Hispanoamericana pageant was held, where 26 Hispanic candidates from around the world competed for the title. At the end of the night, Vengoechea placed 1st runner-up in the contest.

Awards and achievements
Preceded by (Romania) Bianca Tirsin	Miss International 3rd Runner-Up; 2019	Succeeded by (Colombia) Natalia López Cardona
Preceded by (Cesar Department) Anabella Castro	Miss Colombia International; 2019	Succeeded by (Quindío Department) Natalia López Cardona
Preceded by (Colombia) Laura Claro	Reina Hispanoamericana 1st Runner-Up; 2021	Succeeded by (Brazil) Guilhermina Montarroyos
Preceded by (Chocó Department) Alma Beatriz Díaz Bonilla	Primera Princesa; 2018-19	Succeeded by (Antioquia Department) Paula Jiménez García
Preceded by (Atlántico Department) Miriam Isabel Carranza De Moya	Miss Atlántico; 2018-19	Succeeded by (Atlántico Department) Claudette Abuchaibe Sabogal
