= Yaiselle Tous =

Colombian model, psychologist and beauty pageant titleholder

- Born: Yaiselle Tous Tejada; 22 August 1996 (age 30); Cartagena, Bolivar, Colombia
- Height: 1.74 m (5 ft 9 in)
- Beauty pageant titleholder
- Title: Señorita Cartagena 2018-19; Tercera Princesa Colombia 2018-19; Miss Colombia Supranational 2019
- Hair color: Brown
- Eye color: Hazel
- Major competitions: Señorita Colombia 2018 (4th runner-up); Miss Supranational 2019 (Top 10)

Yaiselle Tous Tejada (born 22 August 1996) is a Colombian model, psychologist and beauty pageant titleholder who participated in Señorita Colombia 2018, where she won the title of Tercera Princesa (4thrunner up). She represented Colombia at Miss Supranational 2019 and placed in the Top 10.

== Early life ==
Yaiselle Tous was born on August 22, 1996, in Cartagena de Indias, Bolívar. She completed her high school at Corporación Educativa La Concepción. She later graduated with a degree in psychologist at the Universidad Tecnológica de Bolívar in Cartagena. In addition to Spanish, she is fluent in English.

== Pageantry ==
=== Señorita Atlántico 2018-2019 ===
Tous competed for the title Señorita Cartagena in her regional, being the winner.

=== Señorita Colombia 2018-2019 ===
On November 12, 2018, the final of Señorita Colombia was held in the city of Cartagena de Indias, where Yaiselle Tous achieved the title of Tercera Princesa, with Gabriela Tafur being the winner of the contest.

=== Miss Supranational 2019 ===
Later, in June 2019, she was officially designated as Miss Colombia Supranational to represent the nation in the Miss Supranational 2019 beauty pageant to be held in December of that same year.

On December 6, 2019, she participated in Miss Supranational 2019, at the International Congress Centre in Katowice, Poland, Where candidates from 77 countries competed for the title. At the end of the event, Tous concluded her Miss Supranational journey by finishing as a Top 10 semifinalist.

Awards and achievements
Preceded by Natalia Blanco (Quindío Department) Maria Andrea Arango (Top 5)	Tercera Princesa; 2018-19	Succeeded by (Cauca Department) Valentina Aldana
Preceded by (Atlántico Department) Miriam Carranza	Miss Colombia Supranational; 2019	Succeeded by (Cauca Department) Valentina Aldana
Preceded by (Cartagena, Colombia) Natalia Blanco	Miss Cartagena; 2018-19	Succeeded by (Cartagena, Colombia) Andrea Carolina Martínez Ballestas
