= Señorita Colombia 2018 =

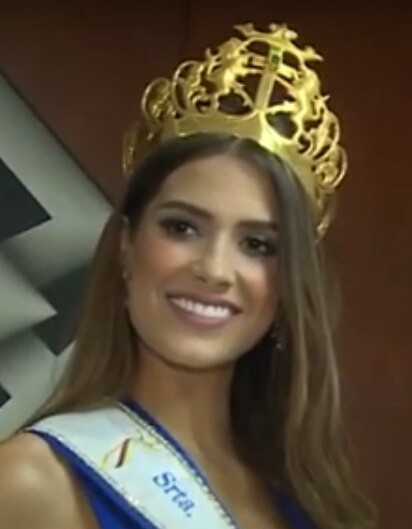
- Gabriela Tafur, Señorita Colombia 2018-2019
- Date: November 12, 2018
- Presenters: Carlos Calero; Daniela Alvarez
- Venue: Cartagena de Indias, Colombia
- Broadcaster: Telecaribe, Telepacífico, Canal Capital, Telecafé, Cosmovisión, Teleislas, Canal TRO, Red Más, Claro TV
- Entrants: 26
- Placements: 10
- Withdrawals: Santander
- Returns: Boyacá; Caldas; Caquetá; Córdoba; Guainía; Meta; Risaralda; Sucre; Tolima
- Winner: Gabriela Tafur; Valle
- Congeniality: Sofia Maury; Sucre
- Best National Costume: María Camila Melo; Guajira

Señorita Colombia 2018 was the 66th edition of the Miss Colombia pageant. It was held at the Cartagena de Indias Convention Center in Cartagena on November 12, 2018.

At the end of the event, Laura Gonzàlez of Cartagena crowned Gabriela Tafur of Valle as Señorita Colombia 2018-2019. She represented Colombia in Miss Universe 2019 and ended up in the Top 5. Señorita Colombia 2018, Valeria Morales of Valle, was in charge of crowning the finalists at the pageant.

Contestants from twenty-six departments and cities competed in this year's pageant. The competition was hosted by Carlos Calero and Daniela Alvarez.

== Pageant ==
=== Format ===
The results of the preliminary competition, which consisted of the swimsuit competition, the evening gown competition, and the closed-door interview, will determine the ten semi-finalists who will advance to the first cut. The top 10 finalists compete in swimsuit and evening gown, while the top 5 will compete in the question and answer round and a final catwalk. Afterward, the winner will be decided by the panel of judges.

=== Judges ===
- Jessica Newton – former Miss Peru, and the director of the Miss Peru Organization.
- Luca Burei – Italian economist, and CEO of L’Oreal.
- Henry Faarup – Panamanian civil engineer, obtained diplomatic and administrative positions in his country and Europe.
- Sirapop Deshraska – Thai fashion designer.

== Results ==
=== Placements ===
- The contestant was a finalist/runner-up in an international pageant.
- The contestant was a semi-finalist in an international pageant.

Placement	Contestant	International placement
Señorita Colombia 2018-2019	Valle del Cauca – Gabriela Tafur	Top 5 – Miss Universe 2019
1st runner-up	Bolívar – Laura Olascuaga (Resigned)	Top 21 – Miss Universe 2020
2nd runner-up	Atlántico – María Alejandra Vengoechea	3rd runner-up – Miss International 2019; 1st runner-up – Reina Hispanoamericana 2021
3rd runner-up	Bogotá – Zara Triana Skaugvoll	
4th runner-up	Cartagena – Yaiselle Tous	Top 10 – Miss Supranational 2019
Top 10	Antioquia – María Luisa Bula; Caldas – María Clara Ramírez; Córdoba – Saray Robayo; La Guajira – Maria Camila Melo; Magdalena – María Camila Cárdenas	

== Contestants ==
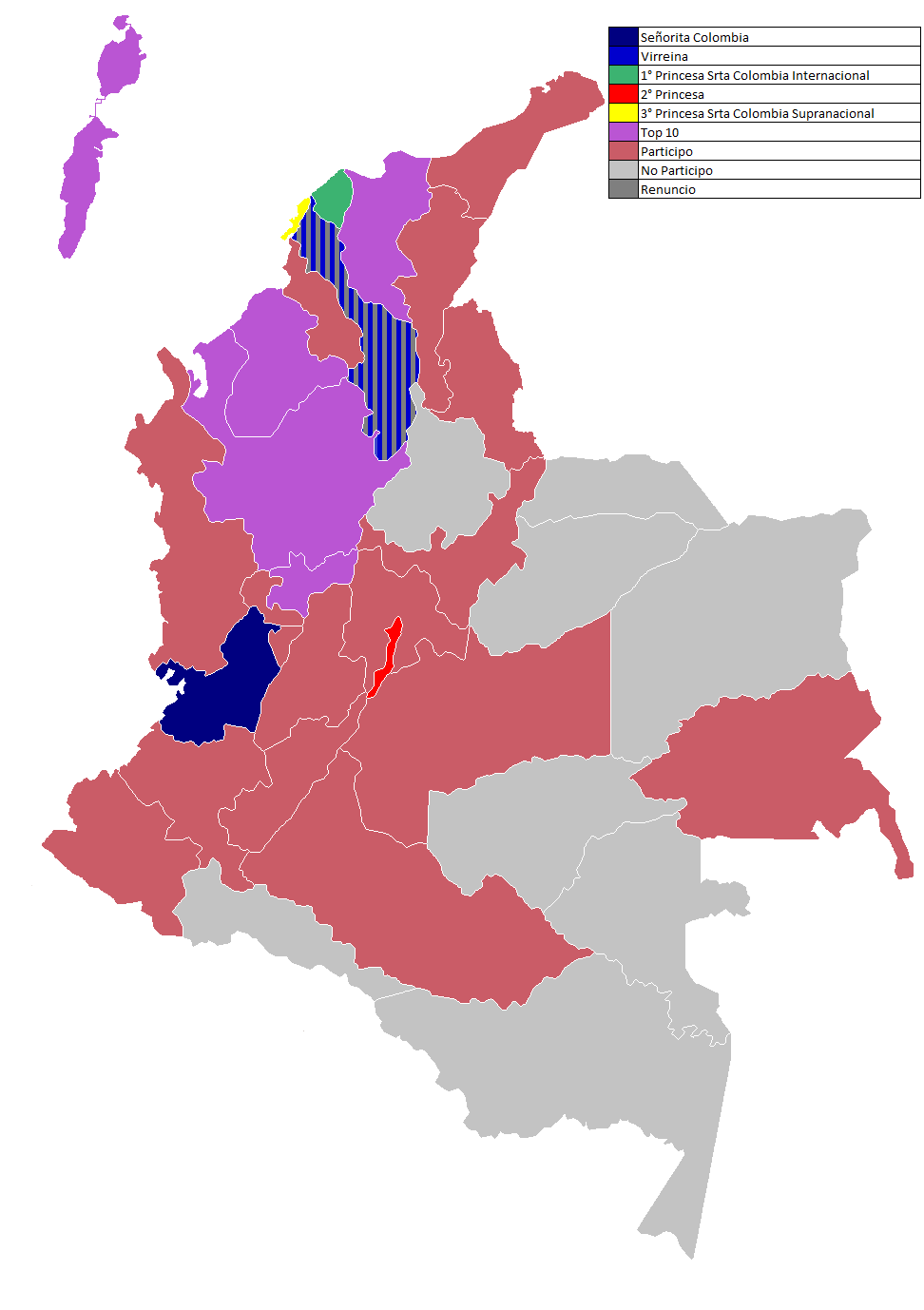
Señorita Colombia 2018 participating departments and districts.

Twenty-six contestants competed for the title.

Department/District	Contestant	Age (Note: Ages at the time of the pageant)	Hometown
Antioquia	María Luisa Bula Echeverri	22	Medellín
Atlántico	María Alejandra Vengoechea Carcamo	20	Cartagena
Bogotá	Zara Triana Skaugvoll	19	Bogotá
Bolívar	Laura Victoria Olascuaga Pinto	23	Cartagena
Boyacá	Amanda Sofía Montealegre Rico	21	Bogotá
Caldas	María Clara Ramírez Valencia	21	Manizales
Caquetá	Ángela Rocío Rico Morales	18	Puerto Rico
Cartagena	Yaiselle Lucía Tous Tejada	22	Cartagena
Cauca	Ana María Velasco Bravo	24	Popayán
Cesar	Anairis Cadavid Ardila	23	Valledupar
Chocó	Libia Marcela Salamandra Pacheco	21	Quibdo
Córdoba	Saray Elena Robayo Bechara	23	Montería
Cundinamarca	Lina Tatiana Macea Dávila	26	La Vega
Guainía	Karol Tatiana Hernández González	23	Puerto Carreño
La Guajira	María Camila Melo Celedón	23	Uribia
Huila	Wendy Taryn López Scarpetta	23	Bogotá
Magdalena	María Camila Cárdenas Rapelo	22	Santa Marta
Meta	Lorena Martínez Rodríguez	23	Ibagué
Nariño	Carolina Salazar Sierra	21	Pasto
Norte de Santander	Laura Juliana Claro Coronel	22	Cúcuta
Quindío	Valentina Arbeláez Camelo	20	Armenia
Risaralda	María Camila Mejía Mejía	19	Pereira
San Andrés and Providencia	Giselle Ann Archbold Davis	24	Providencia Island
Sucre	Carmen Sofía Maury Atencia	23	Sucre
Tolima	Valentina Bonilla Neira	24	Ibagué
Valle del Cauca	Gabriela Tafur Náder	23	Cali
