= Natalia López =

Colombian model and Miss Colombia International 2022

- Born: Natalia López Cardona; 23 April 1999 (age 27); Circasia, Quindío, Colombia
- Height: 1.74 m (5 ft 8 1/2 in)
- Beauty pageant titleholder
- Title: Señorita Quindio 2021; Miss Colombia International 2022
- Hair color: Brown hair
- Eye color: Amber
- Major competitions: Señorita Colombia 2021 (1st Runner-Up); Miss International 2022 (3rd Runner-Up)

Natalia López Cardona (born 23 April 1999) is a Colombian lawyer, model and beauty pageant titleholder who was the 1st Runner-Up of Señorita Colombia 2021. She represented Colombia at the Miss International 2022 pageant and finished 3rd Runner-up.

== Early life ==
Natalia López Cardona was born on 23 April 1999, in Circasia, Quindío, Colombia. She studied medicine at the Universidad Alexander Von Humboldt in Armenia, Quindío, Colombia for a few semesters, but later retired to start a new career, this time to become a Lawyer as her father.

== Pageantry ==
López was designated as Señorita Quindío 2021 after an evaluative process of interviews, photographs and general culture.

=== Miss International 2022 ===
López represented Quindío in Señorita Colombia 2021 and finished 1st Runner-Up to Valentina Espinosa of Bolívar. She was appointed as Miss Colombia International and will represent Colombia in Miss International 2022.

On 13 December 2022, at the Tokyo Dome City Hall in Tokyo, the final of the Miss International pageant was held, where 66 candidates from around the world competed for the title. At the end of the night, Natalia obtained the position of 3rd runner-up, for the second consecutive edition for Colombia.

Awards and achievements
| Preceded by (Colombia) Maria Alejandra Vengoechea | Miss International 3rd Runner-Up; 2022 | Succeeded by (Philippines) Nicole Borromeo |
| Preceded by (Huila Department) María Alejandra Salazar | Señorita Colombia Virreina; 2021 | Succeeded by (Antioquia Department) Valentina Mora |
| Preceded by (Atlántico Department) Maria Alejandra Vengoechea | Miss Colombia International; 2022 | Succeeded by (Atlántico Department) Sofía Osío |
| Preceded by (Quindío Department) María Fernanda Aristizábal | Señorita Quindio; 2021 | Succeeded by (Quindío Department) Sara Victoria Castaño Ramos |
