= Yamile Dajud =

Argentine-Colombian beauty pageant titleholder (born 1996)

- Born: Yamile Lujan Dajud Zuluaga; March 29, 1996 (age 30); Buenos Aires, Argentina
- Citizenship: Argentina; Colombia
- Education: Pontificia Universidad Javeriana
- Height: 1.80 m (5 ft 11 in)
- Beauty pageant titleholder
- Title: Miss Sucre 2021; Miss Universe Argentina 2023
- Hair color: Dark Blonde
- Eye color: Brown
- Major competitions: Miss Colombia 2021 (4th Runner-Up); Miss Universe Argentina 2023 (Winner); Miss Universe 2023 (Unplaced)

Yamile Lujan Dajud Zuluaga (born March 29, 1996) is an Argentine-Colombian model and beauty pageant titleholder who was crowned Miss Universe Argentina 2023. She represented Argentina at the Miss Universe 2023 competition.

== Early life ==
Yamile Dajud was born in Buenos Aires, Argentina when her father Luis Enrique Dajud originally from Sampués, Colombia was studying medicine in that country.

In her adolescence she and her family returned to Sincelejo, Colombia. She later graduated as a social communicator from Pontificia Universidad Javeriana in Bogotá, Colombia. She is of Lebanese descent.

== Pageantry ==
=== Miss Sucre 2021 ===
Yamile Dajud's career in beauty pageants began in June 2021, when, being the daughter of a father from Sucre, she was declared the new Miss Sucre for the next edition of the Miss Colombia Pageant, which would take place during the month of November of the same year.

=== Miss Colombia 2021 ===
In the competition, she stood out as one of the favorite candidates to obtain the title of Señorita Colombia 2021, which María Fernanda Aristizábal held at that time. Her performance during the course of the pageant allowed her to place herself in the position of 4th Runner-up on the night of November 14, 2021 in the city of Cartagena as is customary in the tradition of the beauty pageant, in which Valentina Espinosa was the seventh woman from Bolívar to become Miss Colombia.

=== Miss Universe 2023 ===
She represented Argentina at Miss Universe 2023.

Awards and achievements
| Preceded by (Buenos Aires) Bárbara Cabrera | Miss Universe Argentina; 2023 | Succeeded by (Córdoba Province, Argentina) Magalí Benejam |
| Preceded by (Cauca Department) Valentina Aldana | Miss Colombia 4th Runner-Up; 2021 | Succeeded by (Tolima Department) Laura León |
| Preceded by María Catalina Hoyos Arias | Miss Sucre; 2021 | Succeeded by Fabiana Caleño |
