= List of Argentine records in speed skating =

The following are the national records in speed skating in Argentina maintained by the Argentine Ice Speed Skaters Union (UVEPA).

== Men ==
Event	Record	Athlete	Date	Meet	Place	Ref
500 meters	36.98	José Ignacio Fazio	5 December 2009	World Cup	Calgary, Canada	
500 meters × 2						
1000 meters	1:12.04	José Ignacio Fazio	10 January 2010	Canada Cup	Calgary, Canada	
1500 meters	1:52.42	José Ignacio Fazio	4 December 2009	World Cup	Calgary, Canada	
3000 meters	4:15.60	José Ignacio Fazio	20 September 2008	Time Trials	Calgary, Canada	
5000 meters	6:55.93	José Ignacio Fazio	18 March 2009	Olympic Oval Final	Calgary, Canada	
10000 meters	15:26.08	José Ignacio Fazio	20 March 2009	Olympic Oval Final	Calgary, Canada	
Team pursuit (8 laps)						
Sprint combination						
Small combination	184.943 pts	Federico Chaves	18–19 March 2009	Olympic Oval Final	Calgary, Canada	
Big combination	162.580 pts	José Ignacio Fazio	18–20 March 2009	Olympic Oval Final	Calgary, Canada	

== Women ==
Event	Record	Athlete	Date	Meet	Place	Ref
500 meters	38.35	María Victoria Rodríguez	4 December 2021	World Cup	Salt Lake City, United States	
500 meters × 2	80.75	María Victoria Rodríguez	13 October 2017	Fall Challenge	Salt Lake City, United States	
1000 meters	1:16.99	María Victoria Rodríguez	4 December 2021	World Cup	Salt Lake City, United States	
1500 meters	2:03.00	Valentina Espinosa	22 October 2021	AmCup #1	Salt Lake City, United States	
3000 meters	4:23.39	Valentina Espinosa	2 October 2021	Time Trials	Salt Lake City, United States	
5000 meters	7:24.29	Valentina Espinosa	23 October 2021	AmCup #1	Salt Lake City, United States	
10000 meters						
Team pursuit (6 laps)						
Sprint combination	163.690 pts	María Victoria Rodríguez	23–24 February 2019	World Sprint Championships	Heerenveen, Netherlands	
Mini combination						
Small combination						
