= María Alejandra Salazar =

Colombian model and beauty pageant titleholder

- Born: María Alejandra Salazar Rojas; August 28, 1997 (age 29); Neiva, Huila, Colombia
- Education: South Colombian University
- Height: 1.74 m (5 ft 9 in)
- Beauty pageant titleholder
- Title: Miss Cosmo Colombia 2024
- Hair color: Light Brown
- Eye color: Brown
- Major competitions: Señorita Colombia 2019; (1st Runner-Up); Miss Universe Colombia 2024; (1st Runner-Up); Miss Cosmo 2024; (Withdrew)

María Alejandra Salazar Rojas (born August 28, 1997) is a Colombian model and beauty pageant titleholder who was selected Miss Cosmo Colombia 2024, and was supposed to represent Colombia at Miss Cosmo 2024 but withdrew at the preliminary competition.

She is mainly recognized for having represented the department of Huila in Señorita Colombia 2019 and Miss Universe Colombia 2024 where in both contests she got the position of 1st Runner-Up.

== Personal life ==
María Alejandra Salazar was born in Neiva, Huila on August 28, 1997, although her parents are from Garzón and Gigante. She is a student of Social Communication and Journalism at the Minuto de Dios University Corporation and has a Bachelor's degree in English from the South Colombian University.

== Pageantry ==
=== Señorita Huila 2019-2020 ===
The Huilense made the decision to participate in the regional pageant of her department as a representative of the municipality of Garzón, where she has family roots. During the competition, she was one of the great favorites of the public and the press, which catapulted her into the Top 3 of finalists. In July 2019, Salazar was named the new queen of Huila, becoming from that moment on, a strong competitor for the title of Miss Colombia.

=== Señorita Colombia 2019-2020 ===
With growing favoritism, the young woman arrived in Cartagena at the beginning of November 2019. During the concentration, she stood out for her competitive level, which led her to be part of the Top 3 of the special Police Queen contest and, later, to win the award for Best Handmade Costume. On the night of her coronation, she managed to advance through all the cuts until she reached the Top 5, where at the end of the event, she was proclaimed Virreina Nacional de Colombia (1st Runner Up), with the queen of Quindío, María Fernanda Aristizábal, being the winner of the national title.

=== Miss International 2020-2021 ===
Having occupied the position of 1st Runner Up, María Alejandra would represent Colombia in the Japanese pageant, which is held year after year in the city of Tokyo. However, due to the COVID-19 Coronavirus Pandemic, the 2020 and 2021 editions of the pageant were canceled, causing Alejandra to be unable to compete in the international pageant representing her country, since for 2022 the 1st Runner Up of Miss Colombia 2021, Natalia López of Quindío was selected as the representative of the South American nation in the contest.

=== Miss Universe Colombia 2024 ===
Salazar, representing Huila again, arrived as one of the public's favorites to take the crown, alluding to her experience in the previous national contest in which she had participated. On June 2, 2024, the 5th edition of the pageant was held at the Puerta de Oro Caribbean Events Center, Barranquilla, Colombia, where 30 candidates from different departments, cities and districts competed. At the end of the event, María Alejandra obtained the title of First Runner-up, with the winner of the pageant being the queen of Valle del Cauca, Daniela Toloza Rocha.

=== Miss Cosmo Colombia 2024 ===
On August 11, 2024, Natalie Ackermann (National Director of Miss Universe Colombia) made the decision together with Omar Iglesias (National Director of Miss Cosmo Colombia) to designate Salazar as Colombia's representative in the Vietnamese pageant Miss Cosmo 2024, but withdrew on the preliminary night because of health issues.

Awards and achievements
Preceded by None	Miss Cosmo Colombia; 2024	Succeeded by (Amazonas (Colombian department)) Dayana Cardenas
Preceded by (Norte de Santander Department) Adriana Numa Vega	Miss Universe Colombia 1st Runner-Up; 2024	Succeeded by Incumbent
Preceded by (Bolívar Department) Laura Olascuaga	Señorita Colombia Virreina; 2019-2020	Succeeded by (Quindío Department) Natalia López
Preceded by (Huila Department) Yenifer Perdomo	Miss Universe Huila; 2024	Succeeded by Incumbent
Preceded by (Huila Department) Wendy Taryn López	Señorita Huila; 2019-2020	Succeeded by (Huila Department) Karen Ortiz Díaz
