= Señorita Colombia 2021 =

- Date: November 14, 2021
- Presenters: Alvaro Vargas; Catalina Robayo
- Venue: Julio Cesar Turbay Ayala Convention Center, Cartagena de Indias, Colombia
- Broadcaster: Telecaribe; Telepacífico; Canal Capital; Telecafé; Cosmovisión; Teleislas; Canal TRO; Red Más; Claro TV
- Entrants: 25
- Placements: 10
- Withdrawals: Casanare; Cauca; Cesar
- Returns: Arauca; Caquetá; Córdoba; Guainía; Guaviare; Nariño; Risaralda
- Winner: Valentina Espinosa; Bolívar
- Congeniality: Lucia Cuesta; Chocó
- Best National Costume: Juliana Habib; Córdoba; María Alejandra Enriquez; Nariño

Miss Colombia 2021 was the 68th Miss Colombia pageant, held at the Julio Cesar Turbay Ayala Convention Center in Cartagena de Indias, Colombia on November 14, 2021.

At the end of the event, María Fernanda Aristizábal of Quindío crowned Valentina Espinosa of Bolívar as Señorita Colombia 2021. She represented Colombia at Miss Supranational 2022 and concluded as part of the Top 12.

== Pageant ==
=== Format ===
The results of the preliminary competition, which consisted of the swimsuit competition, the evening gown competition, and the closed-door interview, determined the ten semi-finalists who will advance to the first cut. Internet voting is still being implemented and fans can vote for their favorite delegate to advance to the finals. The ten semi-finalists will compete in the swimsuit and evening gown competitions and then narrow down to five. The five finalists competed in the question and answer round, as well as the final walk, before the winner Miss Colombia 2022 and her runners-up were announced.

=== Judges ===
- Ariadna Gutierrez – Colombian model, actress, influencer and Miss Colombia 2014
- Gabriel De Obarro – President and founder of IndiGO advisors
- Tadashi Campos Makabe – Specialist in general medicine and expert in haute couture design
- David Raya Gonzalez – Research engineer

== Results ==
=== Placements ===
- The contestant was a finalist/runner-up in an international pageant.
- The contestant was a semi-finalist in an international pageant.

Placement	Contestant	International placement
Señorita Colombia 2021	Bolívar – Valentina Espinosa	Top 12 – Miss Supranational 2022
1st runner-up	Quindío – Natalia López	3rd runner-up – Miss International 2022
2nd runner-up	Huila – Karen Ortiz	2nd runner-up – Miss United Continents 2022
3rd runner-up	Chocó – María Lucía Cuesta	4th runner-up – Reina Hispanoamericana 2022
4th runner-up	Sucre – Yamile Dajud	Unplaced – Miss Universe 2023 - Miss Universe Argentina
Top 10	Atlántico – Geraldine Quiroz; Caribbean Region – Valerie Charris	
Top 10	Córdoba – Juliana Habib	Top 6 – Miss Charm 2023
Top 10	Norte de Santander – Silvia Dueña; Valle – Daniela Erazo	

=== Special awards ===
Award	Contestant
Miss Punctuality	La Guajira – Lina María Ramírez
Miss Elegance	Quindío – Natalia López
Miss Congeniality	Chocó – María Lucía Cuesta
Miss Smart Fit	Huila – Karen Ortiz
Best National Costume	Córdoba – Juliana Habib; Nariño – María Alejandra Enríquez
Comprehensive Beauty	Huila – Karen Ortiz

== Contestants ==
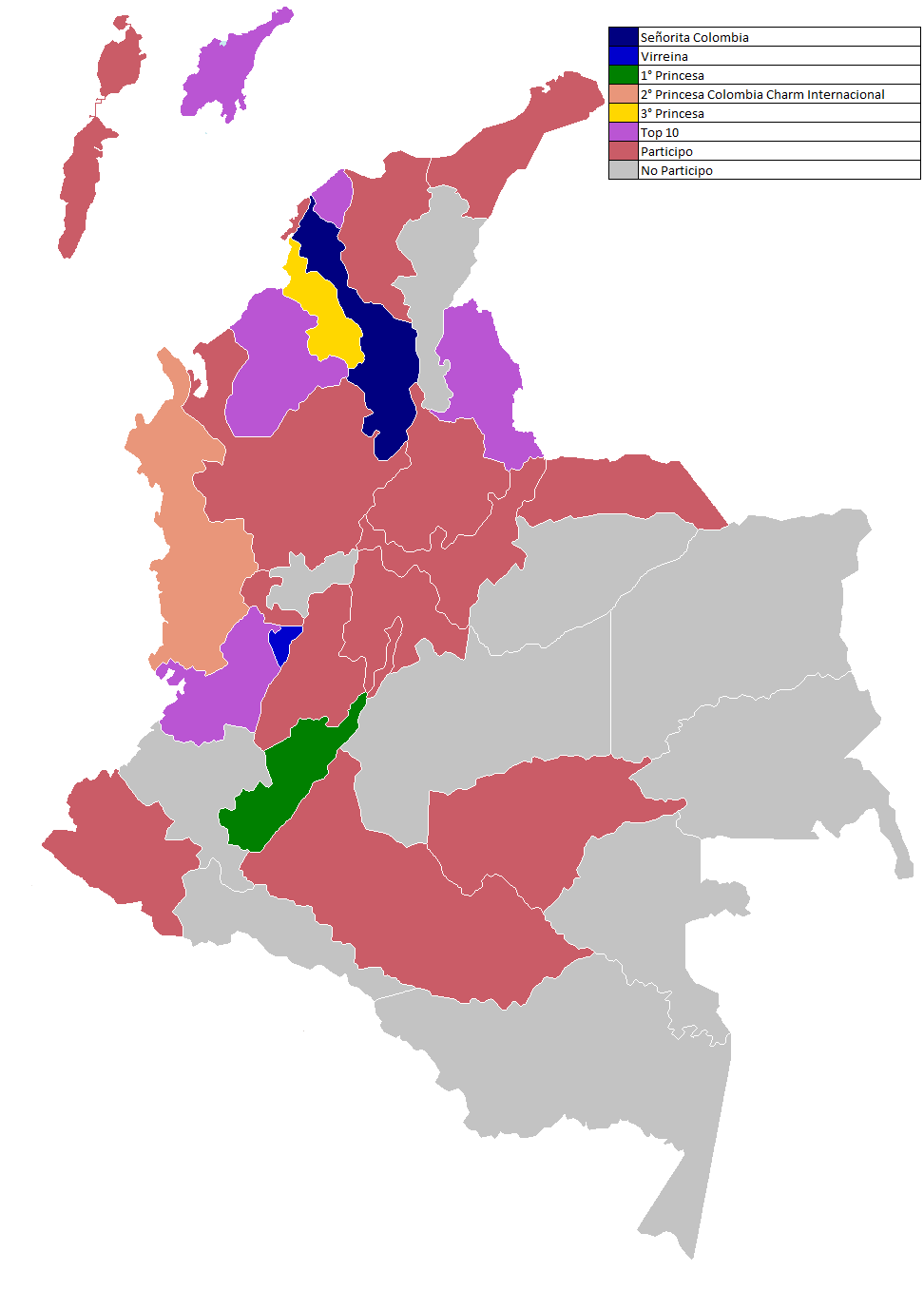
Señorita Colombia 2021 participating departments and districts.

Twenty-five contestants competed for the title.

Department/District	Contestant	Age (Note: Ages at the time of the pageant)	Hometown
Antioquia	Ana María Ospina Martínez	26	Medellín
Arauca	Beatriz Adriana Hernández Jaimes	25	Arauca
Atlántico	Geraldine Quiroz Bermúdez	22	Barranquilla
Bogotá	María Camila Correa Montalvo	25	Cali
Bolívar	Valentina Espinosa Guzmán	23	Cartagena de Indias
Boyacá	Jennifer Paola Díaz Holguín	26	Sogamoso
Caquetá	Lina Margarita Triviño Pineda	27	Florencia
Caribbean Region	Valerie Sue Charris Álvarez	20	Barranquilla
Cartagena	Roysis Yilena González Torres	24	Cartagena de Indias
Chocó	María Lucía Cuesta Arias	21	Quibdó
Córdoba	Juliana Habib Lorduy	21	Montería
Cundinamarca	María Paula Sabogal Triana	19	Bogota
La Guajira	Lina María Ramírez Cepeda	24	Bogota
Guaviare	Luisa María Rodríguez Granados	23	San José del Guaviare
Huila	Karen Julieth Ortiz Díaz	22	Neiva
Magdalena	Valentina Andrea Acosta Castaño	20	Barranquilla
Nariño	María Alejandra Enríquez Cuervo	23	Havana
Norte de Santander	Silvia Katherine Dueñas Sepúlveda	23	Cúcuta
Quindío	Natalia López Cardona	22	Circasia
Risaralda	María José Toro Zapata	22	Pereira
San Andrés	Irma Emiliana Hawkins Iannini	22	Providencia
Santander	Camila Andrea Vega Montañez	22	Bucaramanga
Sucre	Yamile Luján Dajud Zuluaga	25	Buenos Aires
Tolima	Dany Yohana Sierra Pastrana	23	Teruel
Valle	Kelly Daniela Erazo Toro	24	Cali

== Notes ==
=== Post-pageant notes ===
- Valentina Espinosa of Bolivar competed at Miss Supranational 2022 in Nowy Sącz, Poland and was one the twelve semi-finalists. She also obtained the title of Miss Supra Model of the Americas.
- Natalia López of Quindío competed at Miss International 2022 in Tokyo, Japan and finished as 3rd runner-up. It is Colombia's second consecutive 3rd runner-up finish after the 2019 edition.
- Karen Ortiz of Huila competed at Miss United Continents 2022 in Portoviejo, Ecuador and finished as 2nd runner-up.
- Juliana Habib of Córdoba was appointed as the representative of Colombia in the inaugural Miss Charm International pageant in Ho Chi Minh City, Vietnam. Habib was one of the six finalists.
