= Magalí Benejam =

Argentine former beauty pageant titleholder

- Born: Córdoba, Argentina
- Height: 1.79 m (5 ft 10 in)
- Beauty pageant titleholder
- Title: Miss Universe Argentina 2024; (Revoked)
- Major competitions: Miss Universe Argentina 2024; (Winner); Miss Universe 2024; (Top 12)

Magalí Benejam is an Argentine beauty pageant titleholder who was crowned Miss Universe Argentina 2024, she represented her country at Miss Universe 2024 held in Mexico in November 2024. As the Argentine representative, she managed to reach the Top 12 on Finals night. Her Miss Universe Argentina title was revoked by the Miss Universe Organization on 2 January 2025, after she defamed other fellow beauty pageants.

== Pageantry ==
=== Miss Universe Argentina 2024 ===
Benejam won Miss Universe Argentina 2024 on Saturday, 25 May at Auditorio de Belgrano, Buenos Aires.

The Miss Universe Organization withdrew the title of Miss Universe Argentina from Magalí Benejam after "a thorough review of recent public comments made by Miss Magali". The organization said that its decision was based on its core principles of celebrating diversity, promoting inclusion, and respecting all individuals. The Miss Universe Organization stated that the action was taken to protect the integrity of the organization and the opportunities it provides to women around the world.

Awards and achievements
Preceded by Yamile Dajud	Miss Universe Argentina; 2024	Succeeded by Aldana Masset
