= Juliana Habib =

Colombian social communicator (born 2000)

- Born: Juliana Habib Lorduy; March 10, 2000 (age 26); Monteria, Córdoba, Colombia
- Education: Pontificia Universidad Javeriana
- Height: 1.75 m (5 ft 9 in)
- Beauty pageant titleholder
- Title: Miss Córdoba 2021; Miss Charm Colombia 2023
- Major competitions: Miss Colombia 2021 (Top 10); Miss Charm 2023 (Top 6)

Juliana Habib Lorduy (March 10, 2000) is a Colombian beauty pageant titleholder. Habib represented her department of Córdoba in Miss Colombia 2021, where she reached the top 10.

== Pageantry ==
=== Miss Córdoba 2021 ===
Habib was designated on July 26, 2021 as the new Miss Córdoba, which allowed her to represent her department at Miss Colombia 2021.

=== Miss Colombia 2021 ===
At Miss Colombia 2021, held on November 14, 2021 in Cartagena, she reached the top 10.

==== Controversy ====
Hours after the contest, Habib's mother, Carolina Lorduy, dissatisfied with the position obtained by her daughter, left derogatory comments about the body of winner Valentina Espinosa in a video on Instagram. Lorduy commented that the winner had stretch marks on her body, describing it as a horror and expressing the decline of the Miss Colombia pageant.

Later, she offered a public apology to the winner, saying "I want to apologize to Valentina Espinosa, a woman worthy representative of the beauty of our Caribbean region and who will surely shine and leave the name of our country high in any contest or stage where she appears".

=== Miss Charm 2023 ===
As a finalist, Habib was chosen by the organization to represent of Colombia at Miss Charm 2023, where she reached the top six.

Awards and achievements
Preceded by New title	Miss Charm Colombia; 2023	Succeeded by Vanesa Velásquez, Risaralda
Preceded by Saray Robayo, Córdoba	Miss Córdoba; 2021	Succeeded by Julieth Guerrero, Córdoba
