= Miss Supranational 2019 =

11th Miss Supranational competition, beauty pageant edition

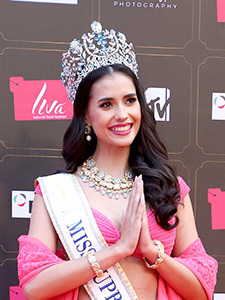
- Anntonia Porsild, Miss Supranational 2019
- Date: December 6, 2019
- Presenters: Anita Jones; Damian Kordas
- Theme: Glamour, Fashion and Natural Beauty
- Venue: Katowice International Congress Centre, Katowice, Poland
- Broadcaster: Polsat; Fox Life; Globovisión
- Entrants: 77
- Placements: 25
- Debuts: Barbados; Zambia
- Withdrawals: China; Denmark; El Salvador; Greece; Guadeloupe; Italy; Lebanon; Malaysia; Moldova; Montenegro; Pakistan; Slovenia; Sweden; Switzerland; Togo
- Returns: Cameroon; Chile; Côte d'Ivoire; Ethiopia; Germany; Honduras; Iceland; Ireland; Lithuania; Macau; Northern Ireland; Peru; Scotland; Sierra Leone; Sri Lanka; Trinidad and Tobago; United States Virgin Islands; Wales
- Winner: Anntonia Porsild; Thailand
- Congeniality: Aimee McGarvie; Scotland
- Best National Costume: Dariana Urista; Mexico
- Photogenic: Viivi Altonen; Finland

Miss Supranational 2019 was the 11th Miss Supranational pageant. It was held on December 6, 2019, at the International Congress Centre in Katowice, Poland. Valeria Vázquez of Puerto Rico crowned Anntonia Porsild of Thailand at the end of the event.

Contestants from 77 countries and territories participated in the competition.

== Background ==
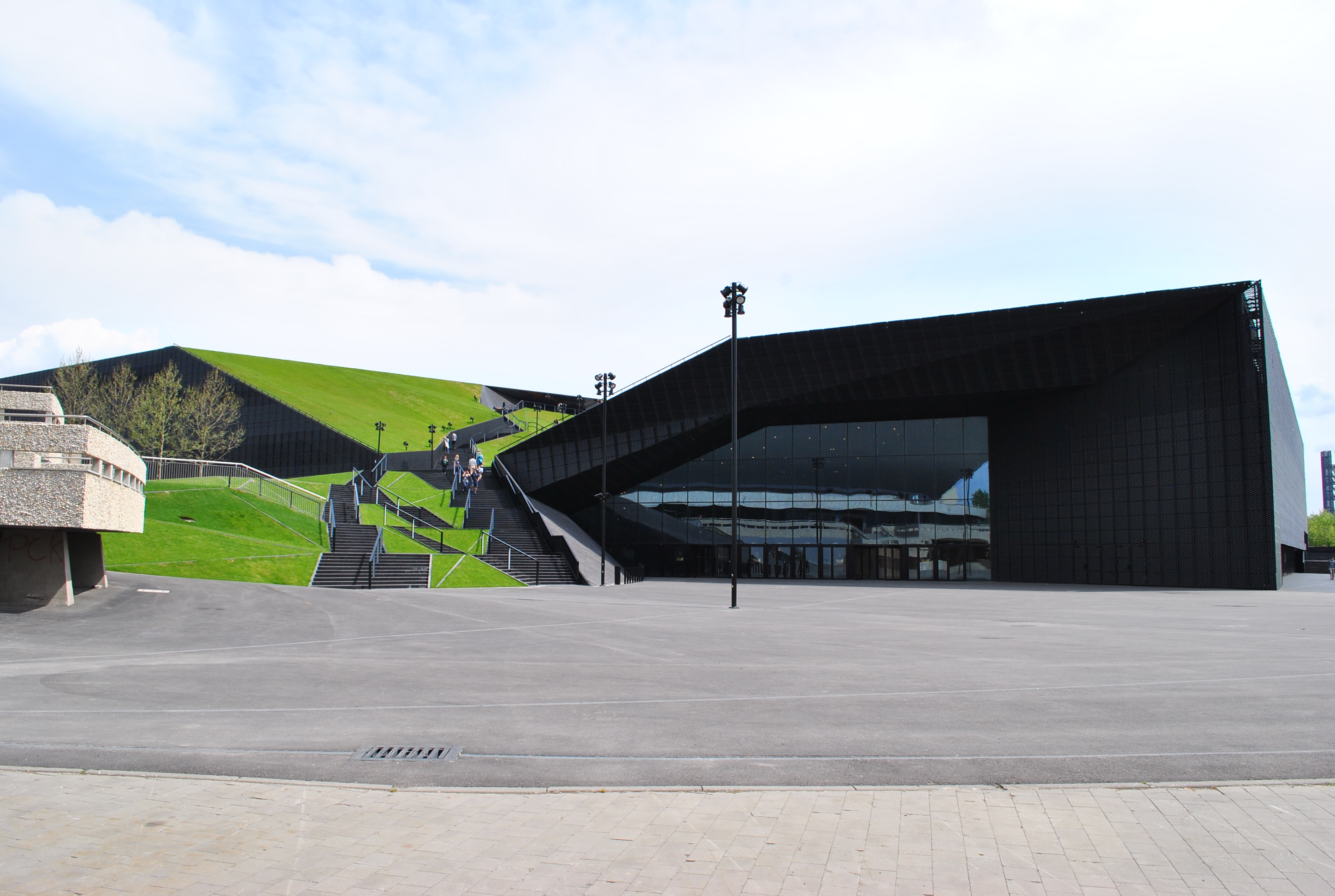
International Congress Centre the venue of Miss Supranational 2019.

On September 12, 2019, Gerhard Parzutka von Lipinski, President of the Miss Supranational Organization, announced that the 2019 Miss Supranational Competition pageant would be held on December 6, 2019, in International Congress Center (MCK), Katowice, Silesia, Poland the competition's venue for the first year. The International Congress Centre was established in the heart of the Culture Zone, in a new and revitalized space near the iconic Spodek and other unique buildings such as the seat of the Polish National Radio Symphony Orchestra and the Silesian Museum.

== Results ==
=== Placements ===
Placement	Contestant
Miss Supranational 2019	Thailand – Anntonia Porsild
1st Runner-Up	Namibia – Yana Haenisch
2nd Runner-Up	Indonesia – Jesica Fitriana Martasari
3rd Runner-Up	Peru – Janick Maceta
4th Runner-Up	Venezuela – Gabriela de la Cruz
Top 10	Colombia – Yaiselle Tous; Czech Republic – Hana Vágnerová; Panama – Krysthelle Barretto; United States – Regina Gray; Vietnam – Ngọc Châu Nguyễn
Top 25	Argentina – Avril Marco; Cameroon – Angèle Kossinda; Dominican Republic – Yaliza Burgos; Guatemala – Andrea Radford; Iceland – Hugrún Birta Egilsdóttir; India – Shefali Sood; Ireland – Jessica VanGaalen; Mexico – Dariana Urista; Netherlands – Nathalie Yasmin Mogbelzada; New Zealand – Eva Louise Wilson; Philippines – Resham Ramirez Saeed; Poland – Kamila Świerc; Puerto Rico – Shaleyka Vélez; Singapore – Naomi Huth; Trinidad and Tobago – Yia-Loren Gomez

=== Continental Queens of Beauty ===
Continent	Contestant
Africa	Cameroon – Angèle Kossinda
Americas	United States – Regina Gray
Asia	Vietnam – Nguyễn Thị Ngọc Châu
Caribbean	Dominican Republic – Yaliza Burgos
Europe	Czech Republic – Hana Vágnerová
Oceania	New Zealand – Eva Louise Wilson

== Special awards ==
Award	Contestant
Best National Costume	Mexico – Dariana Urista
Miss Congeniality	Scotland – Aimee McGarvie
Miss Photogenic	Finland – Viivi Altonen
Miss Talent	Singapore – Naomi Huth
Miss Elegance	Netherlands – Nathalie Yasmin Mogbelzada
Supra Chat	Ireland – Nathalie Jessica VanGaalen; New Zealand – Eva Louise Wilson; Philippines – Resham Ramirez Saeed; Singapore – Naomi Huth
Supra Model of the Year	Colombia – Yaiselle Tous
Supra Influencer	Netherlands – Nathalie Yasmin Mogbelzada
Supra Fan Vote	Indonesia – Jesica Fitriana Martasari
Woman of Substance	Indonesia – Jesica Fitriana Martasari

=== Supra Model of the Year ===
Continent	Contestant
Africa	Equatorial Guinea – Alba Isabel Obama
Americas	Colombia – Yaiselle Tous
Asia	Macau – Christina Zheng
Caribbean	Puerto Rico – Shaleyka Vélez
Europe	Iceland – Hugrún Birta Egilsdóttir
Oceania	Australia – Alexandra Wallace

== Contestants ==
77 contestants competed for the title.

Country/Territory	Contestant	Age	Hometown	Continental Group
Albania	Arta Celaj	18	Tropojë	Europe
Argentina	Avril Marco	20	Santiago del Estero	Americas
Australia	Alexandra Wallace	28	Orange	Oceania
Barbados	Stevie Miles	23	New York	Caribbean
Belarus	Karolina Borisevich	22	Grodno	Europe
Belgium	Camilia Martinez	20	Liège	Europe
Bolivia	María Elena Antelo Molina	25	Riberalta	Americas
Brazil	Fernanda Souza	24	Joinville	Americas
Cameroon	Angèle Kossinda	26	Douala	Africa
Canada	Gloren Guelos	24	Surrey	Americas
Chile	Katherine Muñoz	28	Viña del Mar	Americas
Colombia	Yaiselle Tous	23	Cartagena	Americas
Costa Rica	Lohana Aguilar	21	Cartago	Americas
(Ivory Coast) Côte d'Ivoire	Zao Ouhonssio	23	Abidjan	Africa
Croatia	Helena Krnetić	19	Zagrzeb	Europe
Czech Republic	Hana Vágnerová	25	Brno	Europe
Dominican Republic	Yaliza Burgos	26	Samaná	Caribbean
Ecuador	Fernanda Yépez	26	Manta	Americas
England	Kirsty Lerchundi	18	Bath	Europe
Equatorial Guinea	Alba Isabel Obama	18	Mbini	Africa
Ethiopia	Hanna Abate	24	Addis Ababa	Africa
Finland	Viivi Altonen	23	Tampere	Europe
France	Sheryna Van Der Koelen	26	Saint-François	Europe
Germany	Derya Koc	26	Schwabach	Europe
Guatemala	Andrea Radford	24	Barberena	Americas
Haiti	Schneidine Mondésir	20	Paris	Caribbean
Honduras	Nicole Ponce	25	San Pedro Sula	Americas
Hungary	Szimonetta Fekszi	24	Szabolcs-Szatmár-Bereg	Europe
Iceland	Hugrún Birta Egilsdóttir	24	Reykjavík	Europe
India	Shefali Sood	24	Lucknow	Asia
Indonesia	Jesica Fitriana Martasari	24	Bogor	Asia
(Republic of Ireland) Ireland	Jessica VanGaalen	28	Mesa	Europe
Jamaica	Kimberly Dawkins	25	Kingston	Caribbean
Japan	Natsumi Takenaka	27	Osaka	Asia
Kenya	Emma Hosea	25	Nakuru	Africa
Laos	Pulatda Saydonekhong	21	Attapu	Asia
Lithuania	Jūratė Stasiūnaitė	28	Vilnius	Europe
Macau	Christina Zheng	22	Macau	Asia
Malta	Rebecca Pace	21	Birżebbuġa	Europe
Mauritius	Urvashi Haurheeram	24	Grand Baie	Africa
Mexico	Dariana Urista	20	Culiacán	Americas
Myanmar	Eaint Myat Chal	26	Chaungzon	Asia
Namibia	Yana Haenisch	23	Walvis Bay	Africa
Nepal	Rose Lama	20	Jorpati	Asia
Netherlands	Nathalie Yasmin Mogbelzada	22	Amsterdam	Europe
New Zealand	Eva Louise Wilson	22	Auckland	Oceania
Nigeria	Oluchi Kalu	24	Abia	Africa
Northern Ireland	Nicholle Hembra	28	London	Europe
Panama	Krysthelle Barretto	24	David	Americas
Paraguay	Katherine Masi Zárate	18	San Lorenzo	Americas
Peru	Janick Maceta del Castillo	25	Lima	Americas
Philippines	Resham Ramirez Saeed	25	Buluan	Asia
Poland	Kamila Świerc	20	Opole	Europe
Portugal	Carolina Liquito	23	Lisbon	Europe
Puerto Rico	Shaleyka Vélez	25	Aguada	Caribbean
Romania	Alexandra Stroe	20	Bucharest	Europe
Russia	Valeriya Skolota	21	Stavropol	Europe
Rwanda	Umunyana Shanitah	20	Kigali	Africa
Scotland	Aimee McGarvie	26	Carlisle	Europe
Sierra Leone	Esther Yeanoh Kamara	22	Freetown	Africa
Singapore	Naomi Huth	19	Singapore	Asia
Slovakia	Natália Hrušovská	21	Nitra	Europe
South Africa	Leyla van Greuning	20	Johannesburg	Africa
South Korea	Kwon Whee	26	Seoul	Asia
Spain	Aitana Jiménez Zedán	19	Santa Cruz de Tenerife	Europe
Sri Lanka	Wasana Gunasekara	25	Gampaha	Asia
Suriname	Sri Dewi Martomamat	22	Paramaribo	Caribbean
Thailand	Anntonia Porsild	22	Nakhon Ratchasima	Asia
Trinidad and Tobago	Yia-Loren Gomez	27	Arima	Caribbean
Turkey	Büşra Turan	20	Istanbul	Europe
Ukraine	Ołena Łaszuk	21	Lutsk	Europe
United States	Regina Gray	28	Milwaukee	Americas
United States Virgin Islands	Destani Huffman-Jefferson	24	Richmond	Caribbean
Venezuela	Gabriela Isabel de la Cruz Brito	20	San Felipe	Americas
Vietnam	Nguyễn Thị Ngọc Châu	25	Tây Ninh	Asia
Wales	Emily Ryan	20	West Midlands	Europe
Zambia	Mercy Mukwiza	26	Lusaka	Africa

== Notes ==
=== Debuts ===
- Barbados
- Zambia

=== Returns ===
Last competed in 2013:

- Cameroon
- Côte d'Ivoire
- Honduras
- Sierra Leone
- United States Virgin Islands

Last competed in 2015:

- Iceland
- Ireland
- Lithuania
- Northern Ireland

Last competed in 2016:

- Macau
- Sri Lanka
- Trinidad and Tobago

Last competed in 2017:

- Chile
- Ethiopia
- Germany
- Peru
- Scotland
- Wales

=== Withdrawals ===
- China
- Denmark
- El Salvador
- Greece
- Guadeloupe
- Italy
- Lebanon
- Malaysia
- Moldova
- Montenegro
- Pakistan
- Slovenia
- Sweden
- Switzerland
- Togo

== Crossovers ==
Contestants who previously competed or will be competing at other international beauty pageants:

Miss Universe

- 2020: Finland: Vivii Altonen
- 2020: Peru: Janick Maceta (2nd runner-up)
- 2020: Cameroon: Angèle Kossinda
- 2022: Equatorial Guinea: Alba Isabel Obama
- 2022: Vietnam: Nguyễn Thị Ngọc Châu
- 2023: Thailand: Anntonia Porsild (1st runner-up)
- 2025: Netherlands: Nathalie Mogbelzada (Top 30)

Miss World

- 2015: France: Sheryna Van Der Koelen (as Guadeloupe)
- 2017: Argentina: Avril Marco (Top 40)

Miss International

- 2014: Zambia: Mercy Mukwiza
- 2017: Netherlands: Nathalie Mogbelzada
- 2018: Bolivia: María Elena Antelo

Miss Earth

- 2015: Myanmar: Eaint Myat Chal
- 2017: Cameroon: Angèle Kossinda (Top 16)
- 2021: New Zealand: Eva Louise Wilson (Top 20)

Miss Grand International

- 2021: Netherlands: Nathalie Mogbelzada (Top 20)
- 2022: Guatemala: Andrea Radford
- 2025: Spain: Aitana Jiménez Zedán (2nd Runner-up)

Miss Globe

- 2025: Macau: Christina Zheng (Top 21)

Miss Eco International

- 2018: Portugal: Carolina Liquito (Top 16)
- 2018: Ireland: Jessica VanGaalen (as United States)

Miss Landscapes International

- 2019: Sierra Leone: Esther Yeanoh Kamara (Top 7)

Miss Tourism Queen International

- 2015: Netherlands: Nathalie Mogbelzada (Winner)

Miss Tourism World

- 2018: Peru: Janick Maceta (1st Runner-Up)

World Miss Tourism Ambassador

- 2017: New Zealand: Eva Louise Wilson
- 2018: Bolivia: María Elena Antelo (2nd Runner-Up)

Miss Supermodel Worldwide

- 2019: Sri Lanka: Wasana Gunasekara (3rd Runner-Up)

Supermodel International

- 2019: Finland: Viivi Altonen (3rd Runner-Up)

Reina Intercontinental

- 2015: Paraguay: Katherine Masi Zárate (Winner)

Miss Continentes Unidos (Miss United Continents)

- 2018: Ireland: Jessica VanGaalen (as United States)
