= Laura Olascuaga =

Colombian beauty pageant titleholder

- Born: Laura Victoria Olascuaga Pinto; June 19, 1995 (age 31); Cartagena, Bolívar, Colombia
- Education: Universidad del Norte (BDE)
- Height: 1.80 m (5 ft 11 in)
- Beauty pageant titleholder
- Title: Miss Universe Colombia 2020
- Hair color: Brown
- Eye color: Brown
- Major competitions: Miss Colombia 2018; (1st Runner-Up); Miss Universe Colombia 2020; (Winner); Miss Universe 2020 (Top 21)

Laura Victoria Olascuaga Pinto is a Colombian model and beauty pageant titleholder who was crowned Miss Universe Colombia 2020 pageant on November 16, 2020. She represented Colombia at Miss Universe 2020 and was placed in the Top twenty-one.

== Early life and education ==
Olascuaga was born in Cartagena, Bolívar on June 19, 1995. She graduated from the Universidad del Norte in Barranquilla, Atlántico, where she earned her bachelor degree in social communication and journalism.

== Pageantry ==
=== Señorita Colombia 2018 ===
Olascuaga began her pageantry career representing the Department of Bolívar in Miss Colombia 2018 on November 12, 2018. She placed first runner-up, being awarded the title of "Virreina", but resigned the following day.

=== Miss Universe Colombia 2020 ===
On November 16, 2020, Olascuaga, representing the Department of Bolívar, won the title of Miss Universe Colombia 2020, although she notably tripped during the Evening Gown competition. Olascuaga was crowned by former Miss Germany and current director of Miss Universe Colombia, Natalie Ackermann and Miss Universe 2018, Catriona Gray of the Philippines.

=== Miss Universe 2020 ===
As the winner of Miss Universe Colombia, Olascuaga represented Colombia at Miss Universe 2020, where she reached the Top 21.

Awards and achievements
Preceded by Isabella Atehortúa, Antioquia	Señorita Colombia Virreina; 2018	Succeeded by María Alejandra Salazar, Huila
Preceded by Gabriela Tafur, Valle del Cauca	Miss Universe Colombia; 2020	Succeeded by Valeria Ayos, Cartagena
