= Reina Hispanoamericana 2021 =

30th Reina Hispanoamericana pageant

- Date: October 30, 2021
- Venue: Salón Sirionó, Fexpocruz, Santa Cruz, Bolivia
- Broadcaster: Red UNO
- Entrants: 26
- Placements: 12
- Withdrawals: Belize; Cuba; Europe; Guatemala
- Returns: Canada
- Winner: Andrea Bazarte; Mexico
- Congeniality: Shannia Mora; Costa Rica
- Best National Costume: María Luisa Corrales; Ecuador
- Photogenic: Andrea Romero; Venezuela

Reina Hispanoamericana 2021 was the 30th Reina Hispanoamericana pageant, held at the Salón Sirionó, Fexpocruz in Santa Cruz de la Sierra, Bolivia, on October 30, 2021.

Regina Peredo of Mexico crowned Andrea Bazarte of Mexico as her successor at the end of the event. This marked Mexico’s first back-to-back victory in the pageant and third overall victory.

== Results ==
=== Placements ===
Placement	Contestant
Reina Hispanoamericana 2021	Mexico – Andrea Bazarte
Virreina Hispanoamericana	Panama – Ana Lucia Tejiera
1st Runner-Up	Colombia – Alejandra Vengoechea
2nd Runner-Up	Venezuela – Andrea Romero
3rd Runner-Up	Philippines – Emmanuelle Vera §
4th Runner-Up	Brazil – Bruna Zanardo
5th Runner-Up	Portugal – Theresa Agonia
Top 12	Bolivia – Carolina Fernandez; Chile – Paula Henriquez; Dominican Republic – Karibel Perez; Haiti – Winy Lundi; Puerto Rico – Auda Paola Lopez

§ – Voted into the Top 12 by viewers

=== Special awards ===
Award	Contestant
Best National Costume	Ecuador – María Luisa Corrales
Ambassador of Nueva Santa Cruz	Brazil – Bruna Zanardo
Best Smile	Mexico – Andrea Bazarte
Best Face by Lumed	Venezuela – Andrea Romero
Miss Photogenic	Venezuela – Andrea Romero
Woman Hydrolagen Q10	Bolivia – Carolina Fernández
Miss Huavi Technology	Colombia – María Vengoechea
Amazonas Girl	Brazil – Bruna Zanardo
Best Silhouette	Brazil – Bruna Zanardo

== Contestants ==
26 contestants competed for the title.

Country/Territory	Contestant	Age (Note: Ages at the time of the pageant)	Hometown
Argentina	Victoria Carante	23	La Pampa
Aruba	Jeanique De Palm	28	Oranjestad
Bolivia	Carolina Fernandez	23	Cobija
Brazil	Bruna Zanardo	29	São Paulo
Canada	Tania Lopez Assia	26	Toronto
Chile	Paula Henriquez	25	Balneário Camboriú
Colombia	María Vengoechea	23	Cartagena
Costa Rica	Shannia Mora	22	San Francisco
Curaçao	Cristine Rietwijk	25	Willemstad
Dominican Republic	Karibel Perez	28	New York
Ecuador	María Luisa Corrales	21	Quito
El Salvador	Tiffany Catota	24	San Salvador
Haiti	Winy Lundi	23	Port-au-Prince
Honduras	Dariela Salgado	27	El Paraíso
Mexico	Andrea Bazarte	29	Monterrey
Nicaragua	Odalis Soza	21	Matagalpa
Panama	Ana Lucia Tejiera	27	Coclé
Paraguay	Fátima Rodríguez	29	Asunción
Peru	Alice Cedron	25	Lima
Philippines	Emmanuelle Vera	26	Taguig
Portugal	Theresa Agonia	28	Central Falls
Puerto Rico	Auda Paola Lopez	22	Lares
Spain	Cristina Dona Plaza	19	Málaga
United States	Vanessa Saavedra	27	Miami
Uruguay	Nicole Martinez	21	Montevideo
Venezuela	Andrea Romero	24	Caracas
