= Meira Delmar =

Colombian poet (1922–2009)

- Olga Isabel Chams Eljach
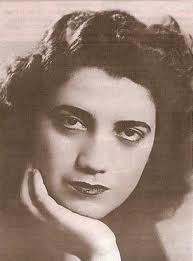
- Born: August 21, 1922; Barranquilla, Colombia
- Died: March 18, 2009 (aged 86); Barranquilla, Colombia
- Writing career
- Pen name: Meira Delmar
- Genre: Poet
- Literary movement: Stone and Sky

Olga Isabel Chams Eljach (August 21, 1922 - March 18, 2009), better known by her pseudonym Meira Delmar, was a Colombian poet of Lebanese descent. She is considered one of the most famous Colombian poets of the 20th century and published seven books of poetry in her lifetime.

She was a member of the Academia Colombiana de la Lengua since 1989.

== Biography ==
She was born in Barranquilla, Colombia to Lebanese immigrants Julián E. Chams and Isabel Eljach. Her father had emigrated in the late 19th century to Haiti and then to Colombia. She was the youngest of three children and had two siblings, William and Alice.

She started writing poems when she was 11 years old. She studied Latin and Music at the Universidad del Atlántico. She also studied fine arts in Italy.

Her first published poems were in a Cuban magazine called Vanidades ("Vanities"). From these first publications, she adopted the pseudonym "Meira Del Mar".

She published her first poetry book, Dawn of Oblivion, in 1942 when she was 20 years old. She sent her first book and a letter to Juana de Ibarbourou, a famous Uruguayan poet.

== Honors and awards ==
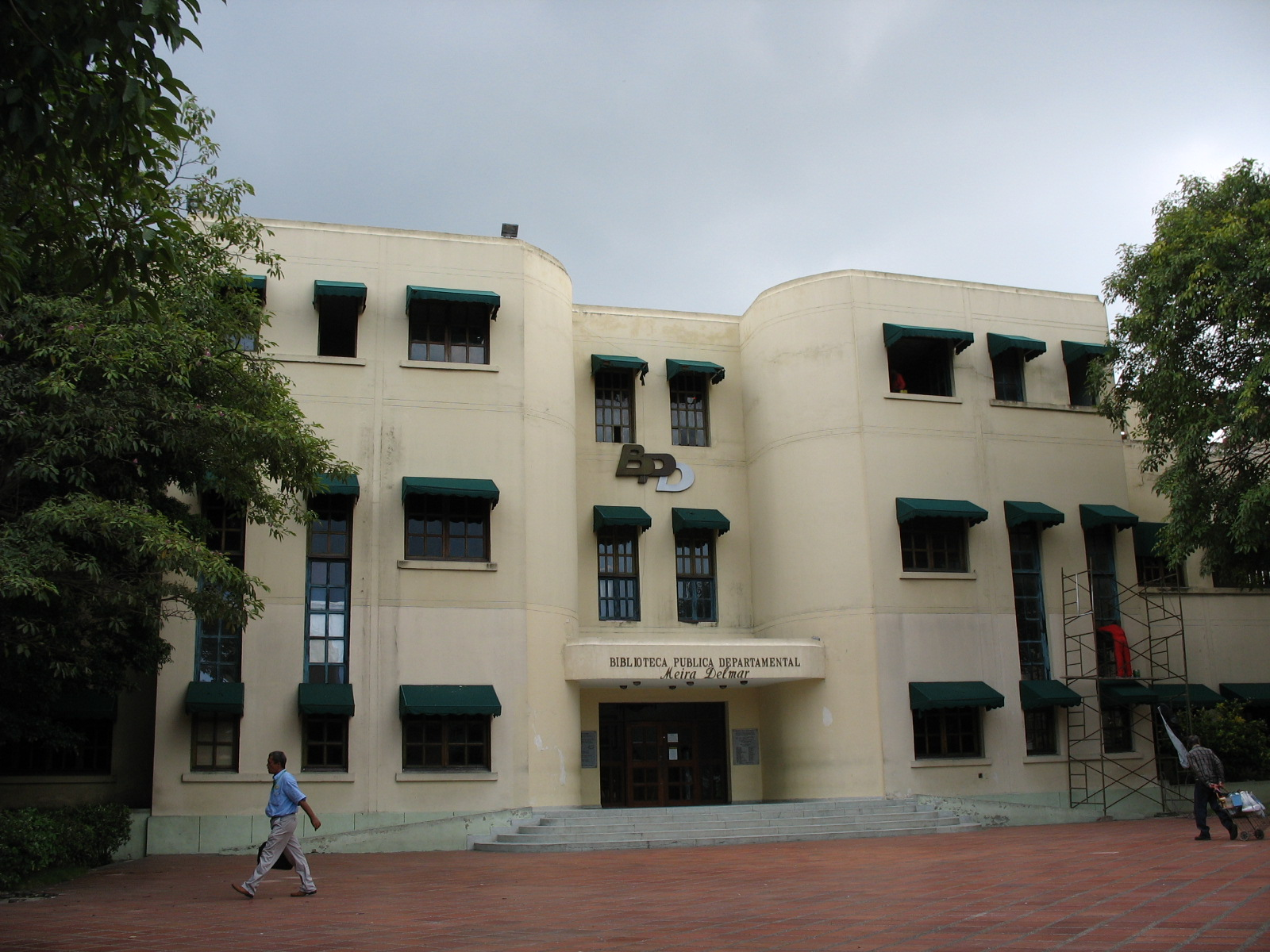
The front of the Meira Delmar Public Departmental Library, named after the writer.

Delmar received several honors and awards during her lifetime. A library in Barranquilla, the Biblioteca Pública Departamental Meira Delmar, was renamed for her after she died. She had worked there as the director for 36 years since 1958. Additionally the Biblioteca Piloto del Caribe, another public library in Barranquilla, named a lecture room after her.

She received an honorary degree from the University of Atlántico. A national poetry prize in Colombia is also named after her. She received the National Poetry Award from the University of Antioquia in 1995. In 1998, she received a medal (the Medalla Gran Orden) from the Colombian Ministry of Culture.

== Works ==
- Alba de olvido (Dawn of Oblivion), 1942
- Sitio del amor (Place of Love)
- Verdad del sueño (The Truth of Dreams), 1946
- Secreta isla, (1951)
- Huésped sin sombra, Antología, (1971)
- Reencuentro, (1981)
- Laúd memorioso, (1995)
- Alguien pasa, (1998)
- Pasa El Viento: Antología Poética 1942-1998, (2000)
- Viaje al Ayer, (2003)
