= Señorita Colombia 2019 =

Miss Colombia 2019, Señorita Colombia 2019, beauty pageant, beauty pageant edition

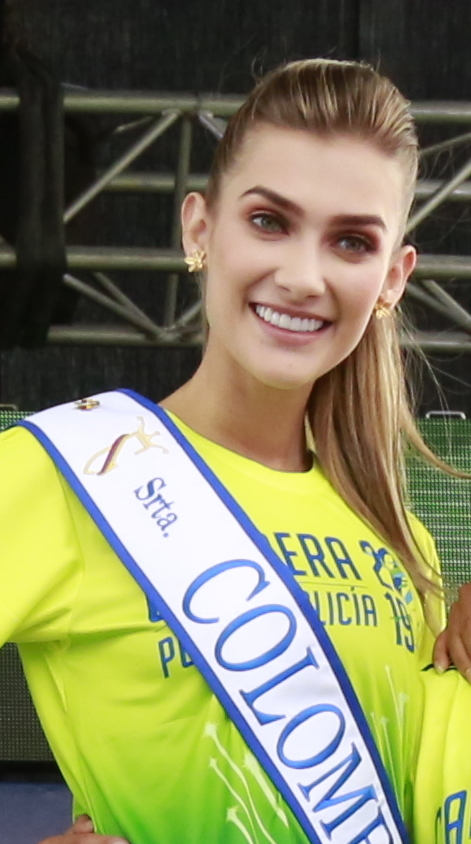
- María Fernanda Aristizábal
- Date: November 11, 2019
- Presenters: Catalina Robayo; Diana Mina
- Entertainment: Alkilados; Safara
- Venue: Cartagena, Colombia
- Broadcaster: Telecaribe, RCN Televisión, Cosmovisión, Telepacífico, Canal TRO, Teleislas, ¡Hola! TV
- Entrants: 22
- Placements: 10
- Debuts: Caribbean Region
- Withdrawals: Caldas; Caquetá; Córdoba; Guainía; Meta; Nariño; Risaralda
- Returns: Casanare; Santander
- Winner: María Fernanda Aristizábal; Quindío

Señorita Colombia 2019 was the 67th edition of the Miss Colombia pageant. It was held at the Cartagena de Indias Convention Center in Cartagena de Indias, Colombia on November 11, 2019.

At the end of the event, Gabriela Tafur of Valle del Cauca crowned María Fernanda Aristizábal of Quindío as Señorita Colombia 2019-2020. Aristizábal was set to compete at Miss Universe 2020, but since June 2020, Natalie Ackermann gained ownership of the Miss Universe franchise of Colombia, where a new pageant would select the representative of Colombia to the Miss Universe pageant. The new organization did not allow Aristizábal to compete in Miss Universe 2020, thus barring Aristizábal to compete in the said pageant. On April 6, 2022, Aristizábal was appointed as Miss Universe Colombia 2022 by the Miss Universe Colombia Organization and represented Colombia at Miss Universe 2022, and concluded as one of the sixteen semi-finalists.

Contestants from twenty-two departments and cities competed in this year's pageant. The competition was hosted by Señorita Colombia 2010 Catalina Robayo and Diana Mina.

== Pageant ==
=== Format ===
The results of the preliminary competition, which consisted of the swimsuit competition, the evening gown competition, and the closed-door interview, will determine the ten semi-finalists who will advance to the first cut. The ten semi-finalists competed in the swimsuit and evening gown competitions and was then narrowed down to five. The five finalists competed in the question and answer round, and the final walk before the winner, Miss Colombia 2019, and her runners-up are announced.

=== Judges ===
- Antonio Androutsos – Panamanian businessman, of Greek origin
- Cibeles de Freitas – Social communicator, public relations and media training
- Joaquín De La Guardia – Financial Advisor
- Davide Russo – Italian businessman

== Results ==
=== Placement ===
- The contestant was a semi-finalist in an International pageant.
- The contestant did not place.

| Placement | Contestant | International placement |
|---|---|---|
| Señorita Colombia 2019 | Quindío – María Fernanda Aristizábal | Top 16 – Miss Universe 2022 |
| 1st runner-up | Huila – María Alejandra Salazar | Withdrew – Miss Cosmo 2024 |
| 2nd runner-up | Antioquia – Paula Jiménez | |
| 3rd runner-up | Caribbean Region – Mariana Jaramillo | Top 20 – Miss Grand International 2021 |
| 4th runner-up | Cauca – Valentina Aldana | Unplaced – Miss Supranational 2021 |
| Top 10 | Atlántico – Claudette Abuchaibe; Bogotá – Adriana Rugeles; Cesar – Giseth Mariño; Norte de Santander – Natalia Manrique; Valle del Cauca – Valentina Cardona | |

=== Special awards ===
| Award | Contestant |
|---|---|
| Miss Punctuality | Magdalena – Luisa Fernanda Cotes |
| Miss Elegance | Bogotá – Adriana Rugeles |
| Miss Congeniality | Santander – Paula Camila Gualdrón |
| Zapatilla Real | Magdalena – Luisa Fernanda Cotes |
| Reina de la Policía | Quindío – María Fernanda Aristizábal |
| Healthy Body | Quindío – María Fernanda Aristizábal |
| Best Face | Norte de Santander – Natalia Manrique |
| Best National Costume | Huila – María Alejandra Salazar |
| Miss Social Media | Caribbean Region – Mariana Jaramillo |

== Contestants ==
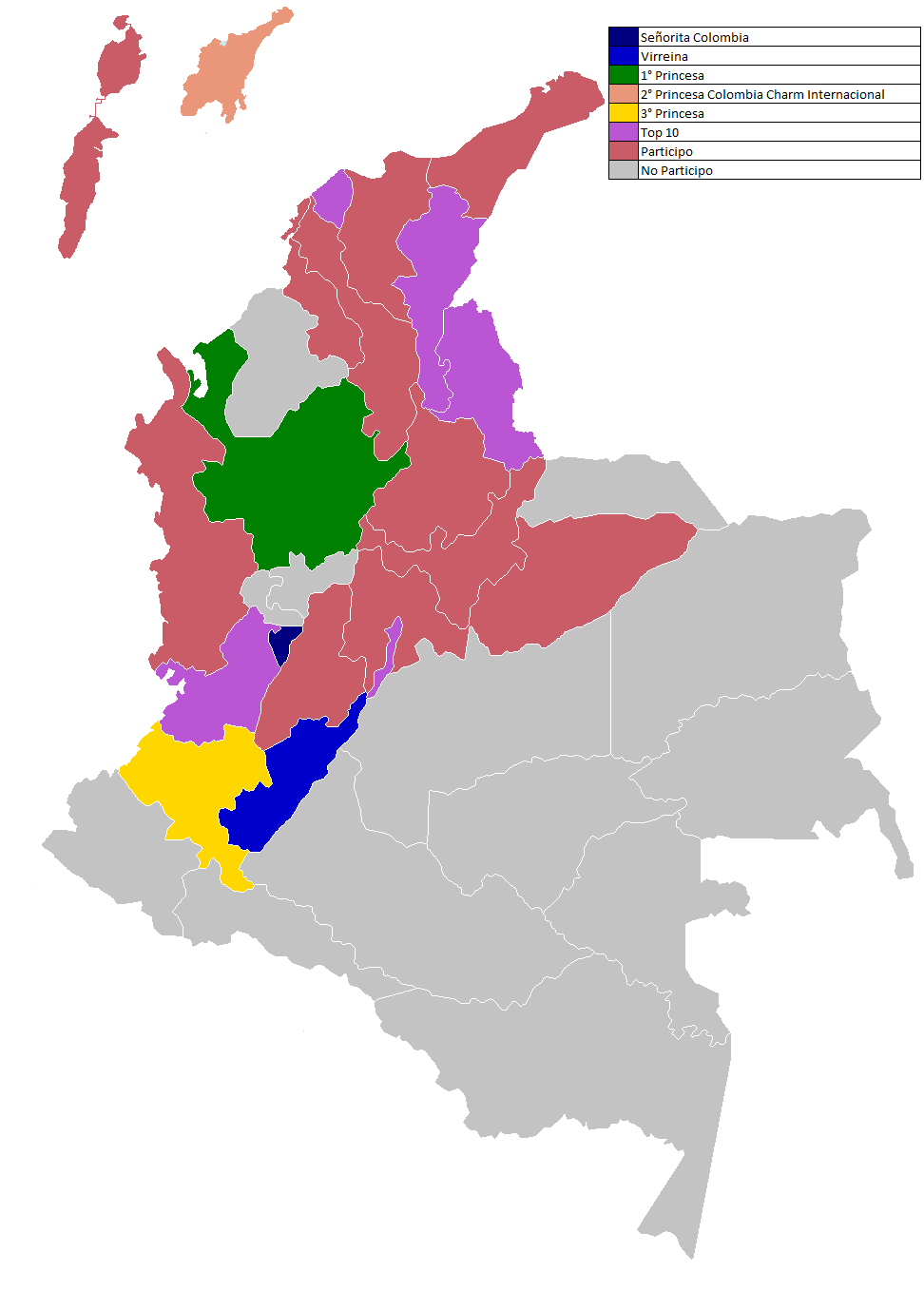
Señorita Colombia 2019-2020 participating departments.

Twenty-two contestants competed for the title.

| Department/City | Contestant | Age (Note: Ages at the time of the pageant) | Hometown |
|---|---|---|---|
| Antioquia | Paula Jiménez García | 26 | Medellín |
| Atlántico | Claudette Abuchaibe Sabogal | 23 | Barranquilla |
| Bogotá | Adriana Lucía Rugeles Reyes | 24 | San Gil |
| Bolívar | Estefanía Gutiérrez Roldán | 25 | Cartagena de Indias |
| Boyacá | Yuli Camila Tinoco Vega | 23 | Chiquinquirá |
| Caribbean Region | Mariana Jaramillo Córdoba | 21 | Barranquilla |
| Cartagena | Andrea Carolina Martínez Ballestas | 25 | Cartagena de Indias |
| Casanare | Juliana José Parra Gómez | 23 | Yopal |
| Cauca | Valentina Aldana Dorado | 19 | Cali |
| Cesar | Kathleen Giseth Mariño Badillo | 23 | Gamarra |
| Chocó | Luisa Fernanda Pérez Moreno | 24 | Bajo Baudó |
| Cundinamarca | María Alejandra Pulido Rueda | 23 | Santa Marta |
| La Guajira | Lumara Stephanie Parra Henríquez | 21 | Barranquilla |
| Huila | María Alejandra Salazar Rojas | 22 | Neiva |
| Magdalena | Luisa Fernanda Cotes Ospino | 21 | Santa Marta |
| Norte de Santander | Natalia Manrique Aguilar | 20 | Cúcuta |
| Quindío | María Fernanda Aristizábal Urrea | 22 | Armenia |
| San Andrés and Providencia | Kimberly Hooker Naranjo | 23 | Barranquilla |
| Santander | Paula Camila Gualdrón Villareal | 23 | Bucaramanga |
| Sucre | María Catalina Hoyos Arias | 24 | Sincelejo |
| Tolima | Natalia Rodríguez Muñoz | 24 | Bogotá D.C. |
| Valle del Cauca | Valentina Cardona Rincón | 20 | Cali |

== Notes ==
=== Post-pageant notes ===
- Natalia Manrique of Norte de Santander was appointed as the representative of Colombia at Miss Grand International 2020 in Bangkok, Thailand where she was unplaced.
- Mariana Jaramillo of the Caribbean Region competed at Miss Grand International 2021 in Phuket, Thailand and was one of the 20 semi-finalists.
- Valentina Aldana of Cauca competed at Miss Supranational 2021 in Nowy Sącz, Poland where she was unplaced.
- María Fernanda Aristizábal of Quindío competed at Miss Universe 2022 in New Orleans, Louisiana, United States and was one the 16 semi-finalists.
