= María Fernanda Aristizábal =

Colombian beauty pageant titleholder

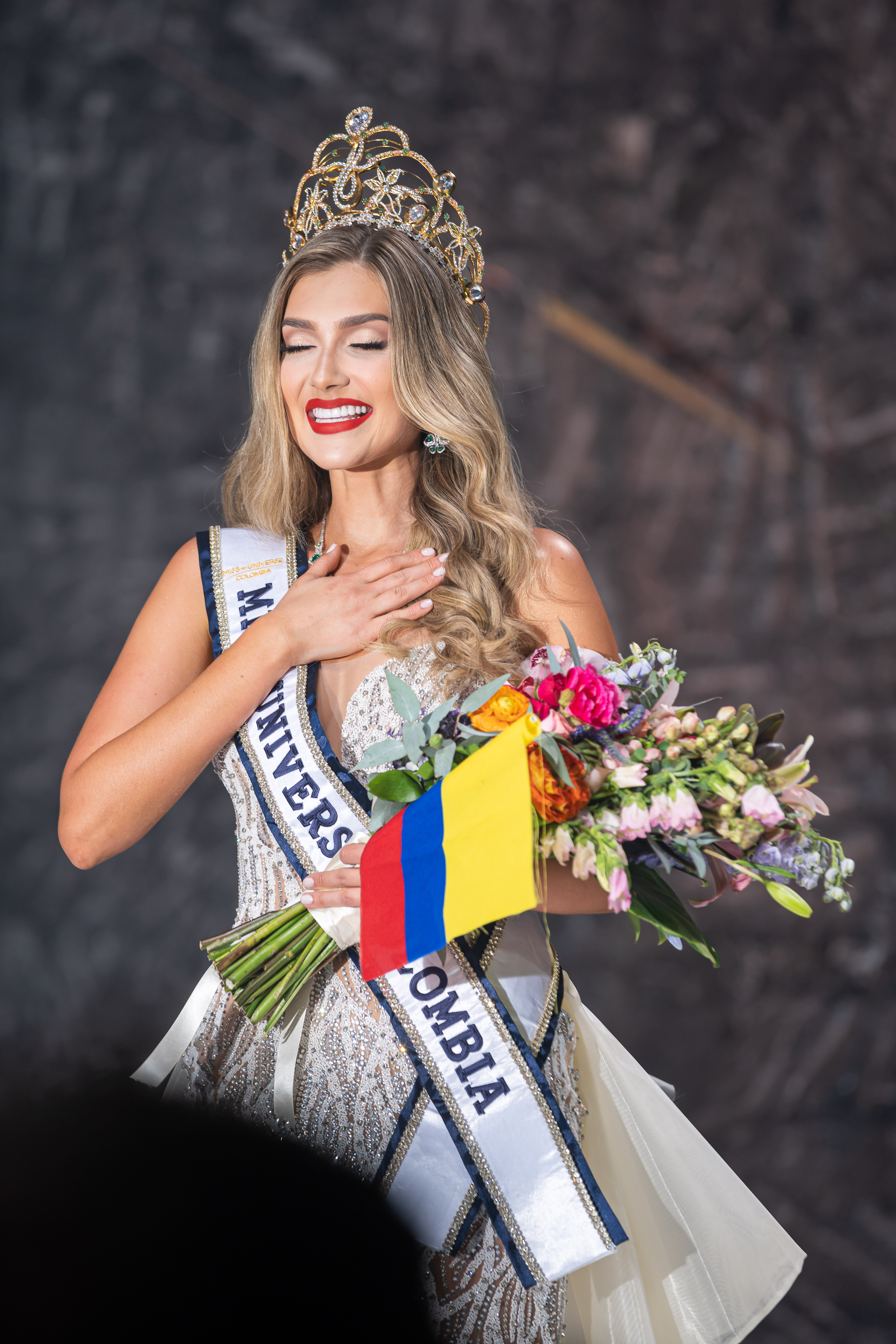
- Aristizábal in 2022
- Born: María Fernanda Aristizábal Urrea; 19 June 1997 (age 29); Armenia, Quindio, Colombia
- Education: Luis Amigó Catholic University
- Height: 1.75 m (5 ft 9 in)
- Beauty pageant titleholder
- Title: Señorita Colombia 2019; Miss Universe Colombia 2022
- Hair color: Blonde
- Eye color: Green
- Major competitions: Señorita Colombia 2019; (Winner); Miss Universe 2022; (Top 16)

María Fernanda Aristizábal Urrea (born 19 June 1997) is a Colombian beauty pageant titleholder who won Señorita Colombia 2019. Aristizábal is the first representative from Quindío to win Miss Colombia and Miss Universe Colombia. Aristizábal represented Colombia in Miss Universe 2022 and reached in the Top 16.

== Early life ==
Aristizábal was born in Armenia, Quindío, Colombia on June 19, 1997. Her father is Bernardo Alonso Aristizábal Franco and her mother is Bertha Lucía Urrea Posso. Aristizábal completed her elementary and high school education at the Colegio Franciscano San Luis Rey in her hometown. She later graduated with a degree in social communication from Luis Amigó Catholic University in Medellín, Antioquia in July 2021.

== Pageantry ==
=== Señorita Colombia 2019-2020 ===
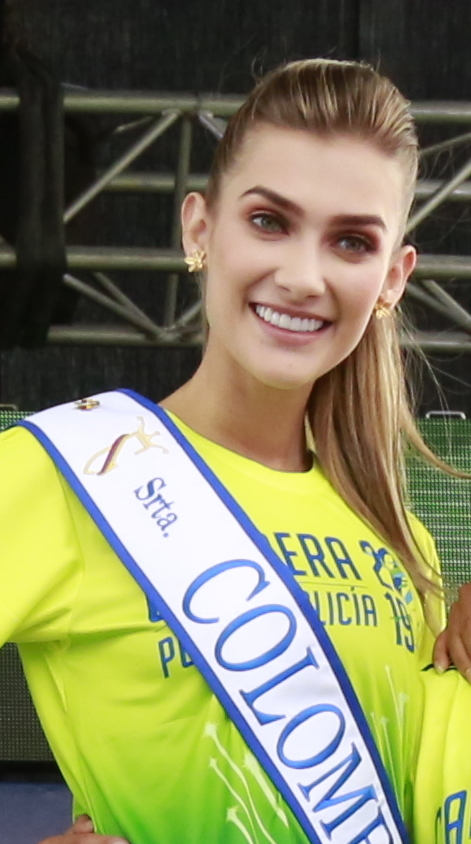
Aristizábal as Miss Colombia

Aristizábal began her pageantry career in 2019, after winning Miss Quindío 2019. This title gave her entry into the Señorita Colombia 2019 competition, representing Quindío Department.

Aristizábal won Miss Colombia 2020 on 11 November. In pre-pageant activities, Aristizábal won the special awards, Queen of the Police and Best Body. She was crowned Miss Colombia 2020 by outgoing titleholder Gabriela Tafur, and was the first representative from Quindío to win the title. As Miss Colombia, she was to represent Colombia at Miss Universe 2020. In June 2020, Natalie Ackermann gained ownership of the Colombian franchise to Miss Universe, confirming that a new pageant "Miss Universe Colombia" would be held to select the Colombian representative in 2020, and that Aristizábal would not be going to Miss Universe.

=== Miss Universe 2022 ===
After finishing her reign as Miss Colombia, she began talks to be appointed as Miss Universe Colombia 2022. After reaching an agreement, she was announced on 6 April 2022 as Colombia's representative at Miss Universe 2022 through a press conference. As a result, Natalia López, the first runner-up of Señorita Colombia 2021, also from Quindío, replaced her to compete in Miss International 2022. At the end of the 71st edition of Miss Universe, she ended up her journey early as Top 16 semifinalist.

Awards and achievements
Preceded by Valeria Ayos	Miss Universe Colombia; 2022	Succeeded by Camila Avella
Preceded by Gabriela Tafur	Miss Colombia; 2020	Succeeded by Valentina Espinosa
Preceded by Valentina Arbeláez Camelo	Miss Quindio; 2020	Succeeded by Natalia López Cardona
