= Valentina Espinosa =

Miss Colombia 2021, beauty pageant titleholder, Colombian model

- Born: Valentina Espinosa Guzmán; 17 January 1998 (age 28); Cartagena, Bolivar, Colombia
- Height: 1.80 m (5 ft 11 in)
- Beauty pageant titleholder
- Title: Miss Bolívar 2021; Miss Colombia 2021; Miss Supranational Americas 2022
- Hair color: Light Brown
- Eye color: Hazel
- Major competitions: Señorita Colombia 2021 (Winner); Miss Supranational 2022 (Top 12)

Valentina Espinosa Guzmán (born 17 January 1998) is a Colombian model, social communicator and beauty pageant titleholder who the winner of the Señorita Colombia 2021.

== Early life ==
Valentina was born on 17 January 1998 in Cartagena de Indias, Bolívar, Colombia. She completed her secondary education at Aspaen Cartagena de Indias.

She later graduated as a social communicator and journalist from the Universidad del Norte in Barranquilla.

== Pageantry ==
=== Señorita Bolívar 2021 ===
Valentina Espinosa began her career as a beauty queen in 2021, when she received the title of Señorita Bolívar, thus gaining the responsibility of representing her department in the Miss Colombia pageant, which would be held in November of the same year.

=== Señorita Colombia 2021 ===
In the city of Cartagena de Indias, during November 2021, the competition began to choose the new Miss Colombia, who would become the successor of María Fernanda Aristizábal in the challenges leading up to the final night, Valentina was widely favoured by the audience, and was also a finalist in the competition for the Belleza Integral award.

On the 14th of November the election and coronation evening was held, in which Valentina managed to stand out to the point of reaching the top final of the contest. At the end of the night, she was crowned Miss Colombia 2021, becoming the seventh woman from Bolívar department to win this recognition, after Natalia Navarro was the last representative of the department to achieve it, during the 2009 edition.

=== Miss Supranational 2022 ===
Among her commitments as queen of the Colombians, she is set to participate in the Miss Supranational 2022 pageant, so she will travel this year to Poland to represent her country

. Valentina competed with the other 69 countries, by the end of the event, She ended up at Top 12. also obtaining the sash of Miss Supranational Americas.

Awards and achievements
Preceded by María Fernanda Aristizábal	Señorita Colombia; 2021	Succeeded by Sofía Osío
Preceded by Valentina Aldana	Miss Colombia Supranational; 2022	Succeeded by Valentina Mora
Preceded by Estefanía Gutiérrez	Señorita Bolivar; 2021	Succeeded by María José Hernández
