= Gabriela Tafur =

Colombian lawyer, model, and beauty pageant titleholder

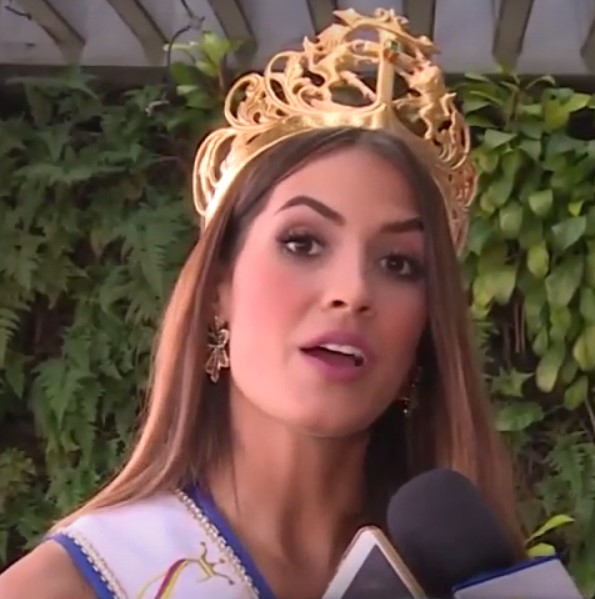
- Tafur in 2018
- Born: Gabriela Tafur Náder; 7 July 1995 (age 31); Cali, Cauca Valley, Colombia
- Education: University of Los Andes
- Spouse: Esteban Santos (m. 2024)
- Relatives: Juan Manuel Santos (Father-in-law); María Clemencia de Santos (Mother-in-law)
- Beauty pageant titleholder
- Title: Miss Colombia 2018
- Hair color: Light Brown
- Eye color: Brown
- Major competitions: Miss Colombia 2018; (Winner); Miss Universe 2019; (Top 5)

Gabriela Tafur Náder (born 7 July 1995) is a Colombian lawyer, model & beauty pageant titleholder who was crowned Miss Colombia 2018. She represented Colombia at Miss Universe 2019 and was placed in the Top 5 finalist.

== Early life and education ==
Tafur was born in Cali on 7 July 1995 to Octavio Tafur and Olga Liliana Náder. She is of maternal Lebanese descent; her grandfather was originally from Chartoun, Aley District in Lebanon, and immigrated to Colombia during the Lebanese Civil War. She speaks Spanish, English and Portuguese.

After graduating from Colegio Bolivar in Cali, Tafur moved to Bogotá to study law at the University of Los Andes, where she graduated cum laude. Tafur then worked as a lawyer in the legal department of Microsoft Colombia, and acted as a coordinator for the commercial law specialization at the University of Los Andes.

== Pageantry ==
=== Miss Colombia 2018 ===
In 2018, Tafur competed in and won Miss Colombia 2018 in Cartagena, Colombia. She was crowned by outgoing titleholder Valeria Morales. Tafur won two supplementary titles: Miss Punctuality Bulova and Queen of the Police.

As Miss Colombia, she was invited to the Lebanese diaspora energy conference held in Lebanon in June 2019.

=== Miss Universe 2019 ===
Tafur she represented Colombia at Miss Universe 2019, top twenty wildcards, narrow top ten for swimsuit & evening gown and q&a reached in the top five.

== Private Life ==
On 7 September 2024, at Hacienda Manuelita in Valle del Cauca, Tafur married Esteban Santos, the youngest son of former Colombian President Juan Manuel Santos and María Clemencia de Santos.

Awards and achievements
Preceded by (Puerto Rico) Kiara Ortega (Vietnam) H'Hen Niê	Miss Universe top 5 Finalist (with (Thailand) Paweensuda Drouin); 2019	Succeeded by (India) Adline Castelino (3rd Runner-Up) (Dominican Republic) Kimberly Jiménez (4th Runner-Up)
Preceded by Laura González, Cartagena	Miss Colombia; 2018	Succeeded by María Fernanda Aristizábal, Quindío
Preceded by Valeria Morales, Valle del Cauca	Miss Universe Colombia; 2019	Succeeded by Laura Olascuaga, Bolívar
