= Barranquilla =

Capital district of Atlántico Department, Colombia

- District and city
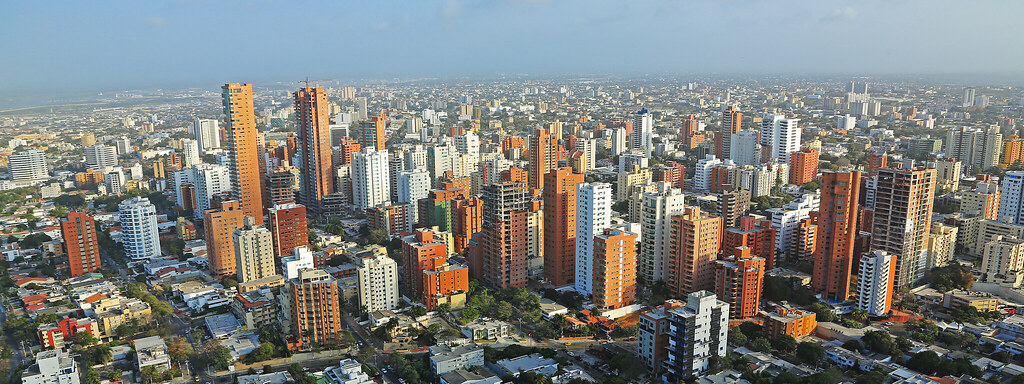
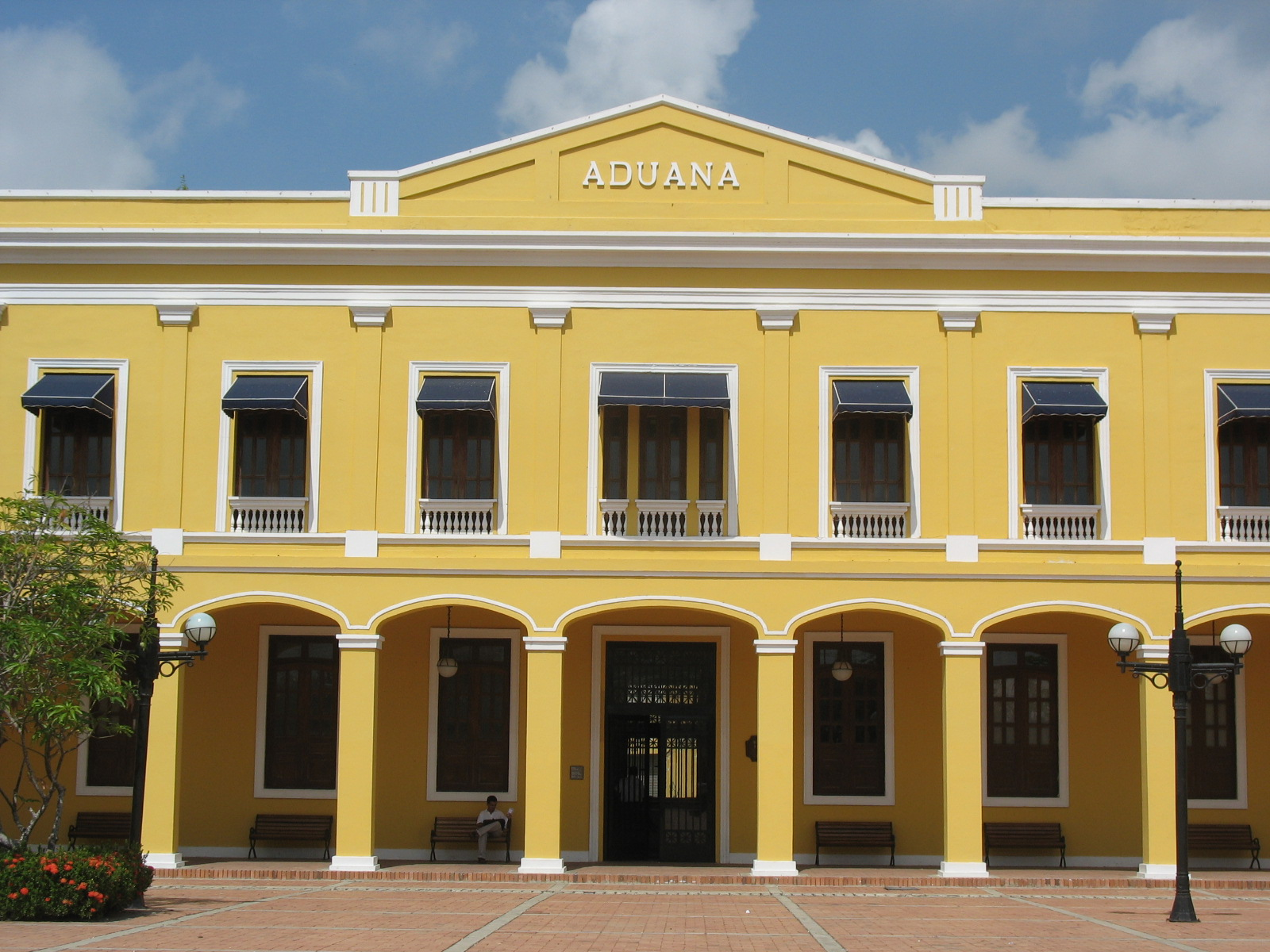
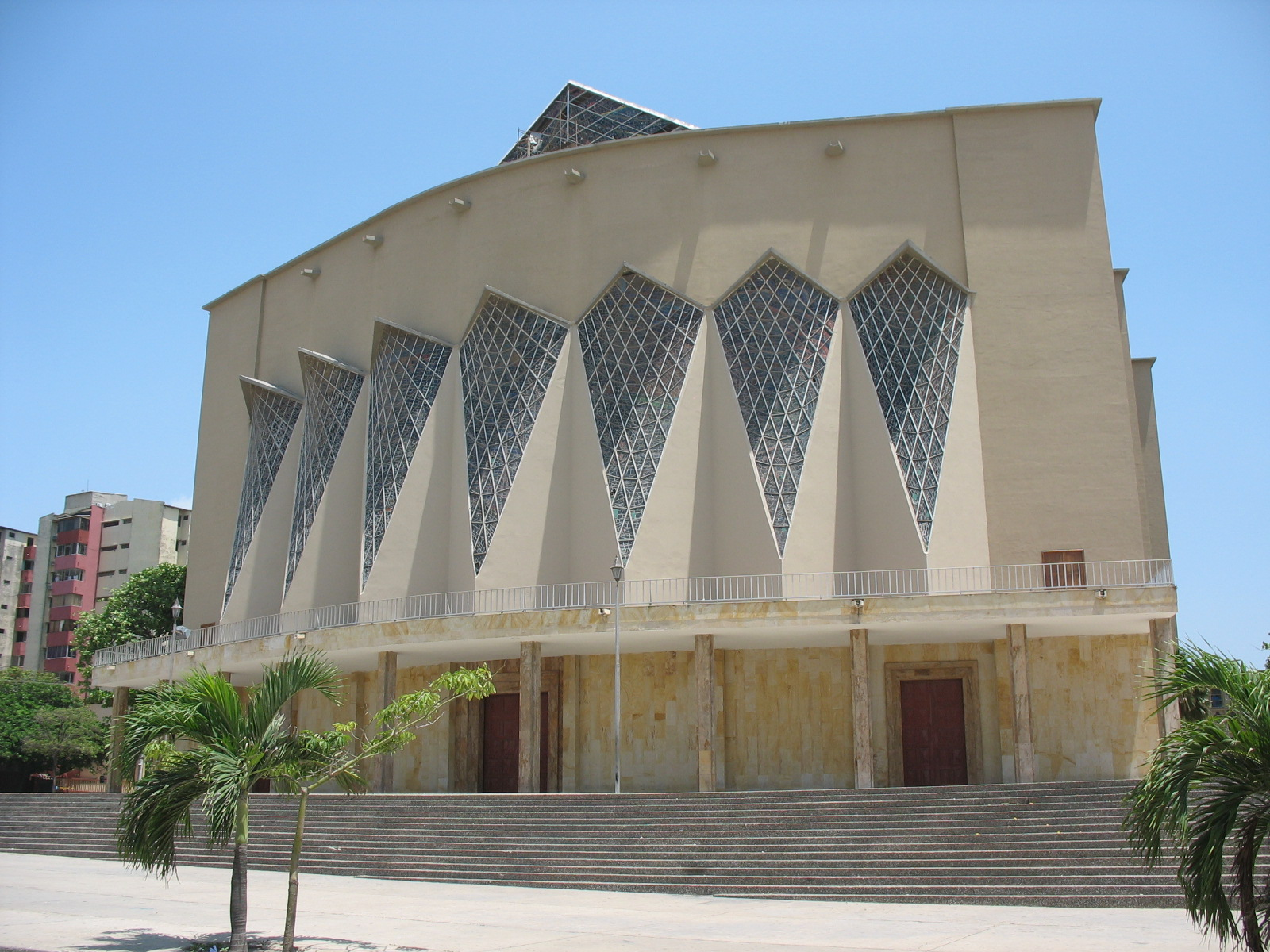
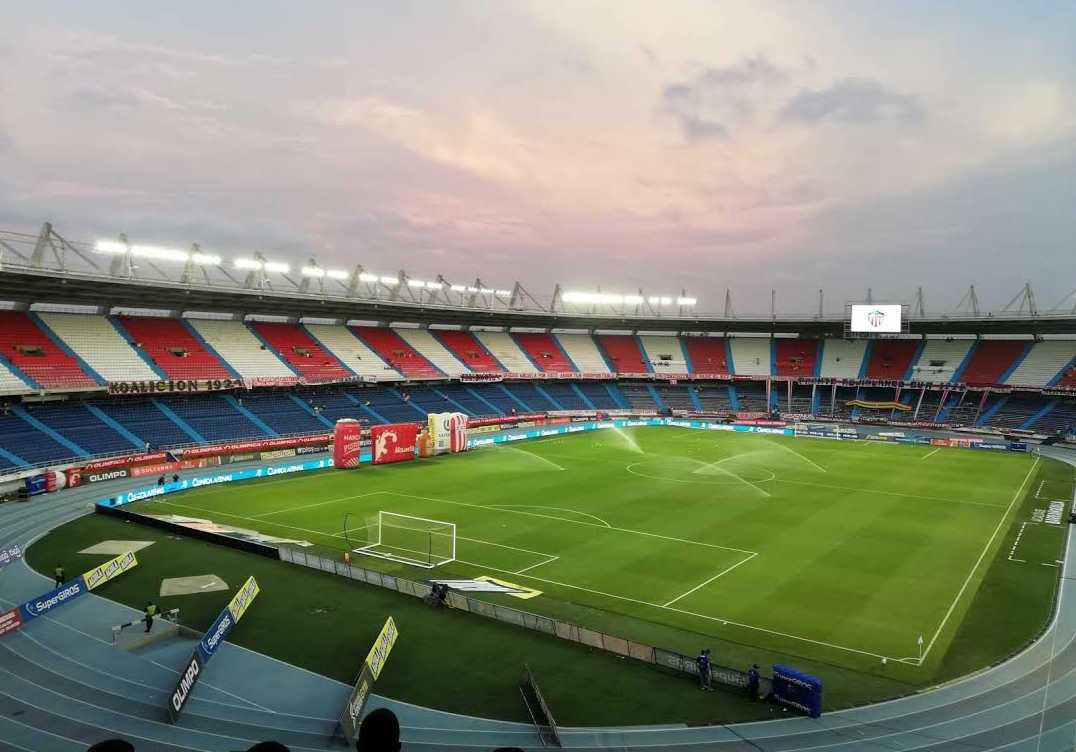
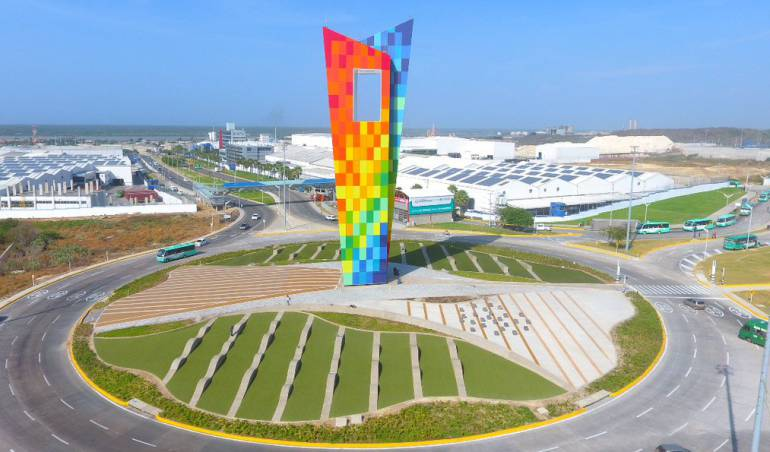
- Skyline of Barranquilla Antigua Aduana Queen Mary Cathedral Estadio Metropolitano Ventana al mundo

- Flag Coat of arms
- Nickname: La Puerta de Oro de Colombia (Spanish for 'Colombia's Golden Gate')
- Motto: Ven vive Barranquilla ("Come and live Barranquilla")
- Location in Atlántico Department

- Location within Colombia Location within South America
- Coordinates: 10°59′00″N 74°48′07″W
- Country: Colombia
- Region: Caribbean
- Department: Atlántico
- Established: April 7, 1813

Government
  - Mayor: Alejandro Char (Radical Change)

Area
  - District and city: 154 km^{2} (59 sq mi)
- Elevation: 18 m (59 ft)

Population (2018)
  - District and city: 1,206,319
  - Estimate (2023): 1,327,209
  - Rank: ranked 4th
  - Density: 8,618/km^{2} (22,320/sq mi)
  - Urban: 1,326,588
  - Metro: 2,370,000
- Demonym: Barranquillero/a

GDP (Nominal, 2024)
  - Year: 2024
  - Total: $14.98 billion
  - Per capita: $11,293
- Time zone: UTC-5
- Postal code: 080020
- Area code: 57 + 605
- Website: www.barranquilla.gov.co (in Spanish)

Barranquilla (/ˌbærəŋˈkiː(j)ə/; Latin American Spanish: [baraŋˈkiʝa]) is the capital district of the Atlántico department in Colombia. It is located near the Caribbean Sea and is the largest city and third port in the Caribbean coast region; as of 2018, it had a population of 1,206,319, making it Colombia's fourth-most populous city after Bogotá, Medellín, and Cali.

Barranquilla lies strategically next to the delta of the Magdalena River, 7.5 km (4.7 mi) (originally 25 km (16 mi) before rapid urban growth) from its mouth at the Caribbean Sea, serving as a port for river and maritime transportation within Colombia. It is also the main economic center of the Atlántico department in Colombia. The city is the core of the Barranquilla metropolitan area, with a population of over 2 million, which also includes the municipalities of Soledad, Galapa, Malambo, and Puerto Colombia.

Barranquilla was legally established as a town on April 7, 1813, although it dates from at least 1629. It grew into an important port, serving as a haven for immigrants from Europe, especially during and immediately following World War I and World War II, when waves of additional immigrants from the Middle East and Asia arrived. Barranquilla became Colombia's main port, and with its level of industrialization and modernity, it earned the nickname "Colombia's Golden Gate" (Spanish: La Puerta de Oro de Colombia). In the 1940s, Barranquilla was the second-largest city in Colombia and one of the most modern cities in the Caribbean and in South America; later local administrations, due to widespread corruption in their ranks, brought about a decline in the standard of living. As government investment increased in other Colombian cities, Barranquilla's national position was eclipsed.

Barranquilla has hosted the 2018 Central American and Caribbean Games. The city is home to one of the most important folk and cultural festivals of Colombia, the Carnival of Barranquilla, which was declared a National Cultural Heritage by the Congress of Colombia in 2001 and recognized by UNESCO in 2003.

Ernesto Cortissoz International Airport, built in Barranquilla in 1919, was the first airport in South America. The city is served by domestic and international flights and was Avianca's first hub.

== Etymology ==
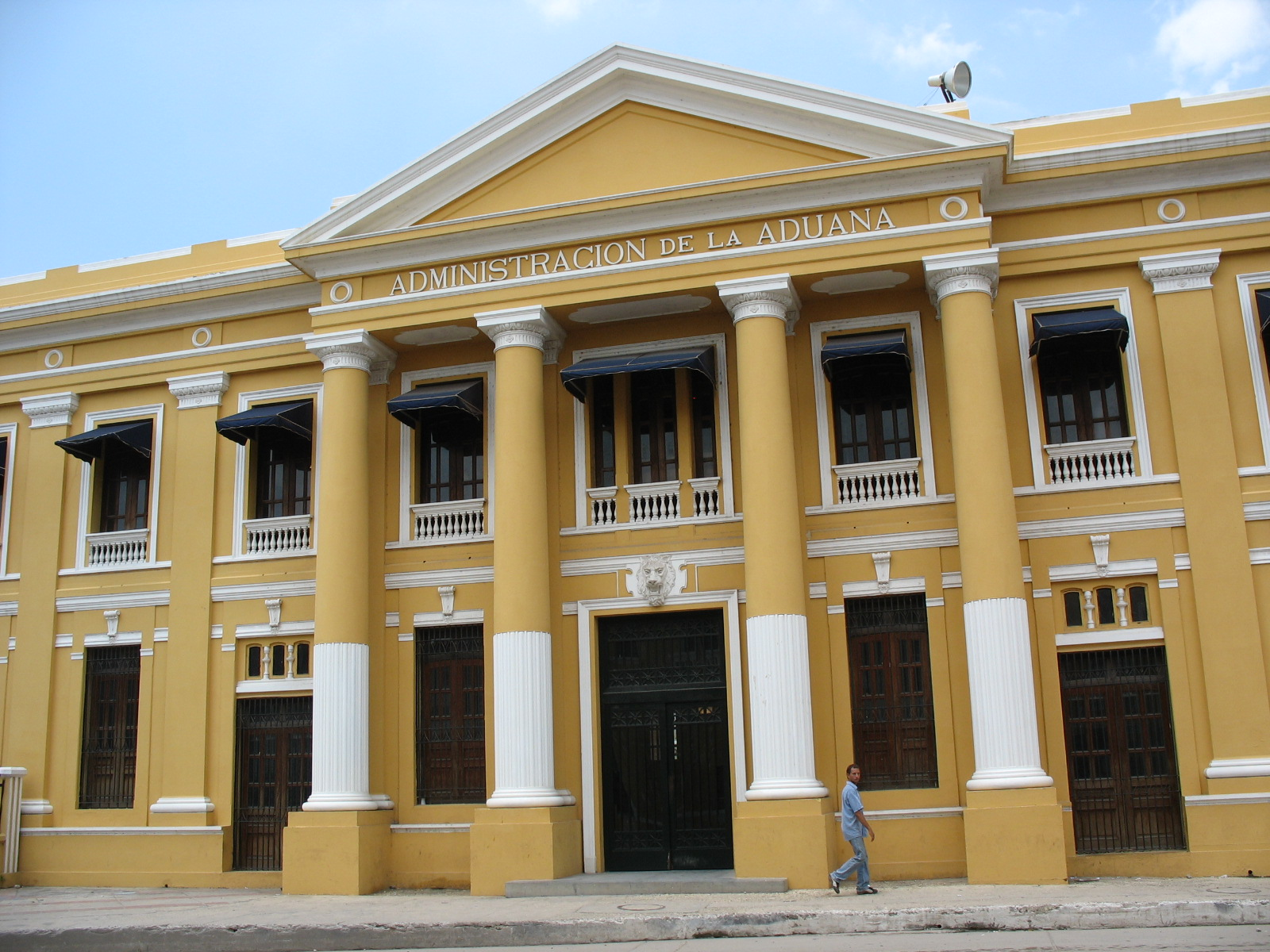
Old customs administration building in Barranquilla

Barranquilla's name refers to the canyons that existed in the area adjacent to the Magdalena, where the city arose. During the Spanish colonization of the Americas, the name barranca ('canyon', 'ravine') was common in coastal communities (Barrancabermeja, Barranca Nueva, Barranca Vieja, etc.). This name was probably derived from an alteration of Aragon. During Spanish colonization, the area was known as Camacho or Kamash Indian Site, and San Nicolás de la Barranquilla (patron saint of San Nicolás de Tolentino) began to develop the area with the estates of Barrancas de Camacho, Barrancas de San Nicolás, Barranquilla de Camacho, and Barranquilla de San Nicolás, from which the city name is derived.

=== Nicknames ===
In 1921, President Marco Fidel Suárez called the city the Puerta de Oro de la República (Golden Gate of the Republic) in recognition of its economic importance as a port since the late 19th century. In 1946, opening the 5th Central American and Caribbean Games, President Mariano Ospina Pérez reaffirmed the nickname of the city as the "Golden Gate".

Barranquilla is also known as La Arenosa (meaning The Sandy), so named by the president of New Granada, Tomás Cipriano de Mosquera, during his stay in Barranquilla in 1849. Curramba, la Bella was also used to refer to Barranquilla by journalist Juan Eugenio Cañavera in Bogotá in the mid-twentieth century. The "la Bella" part was assigned by fellow journalist Roger Araújo as a counterweight to the word Curramba, which is seen as derogatory, derived from adjective "currambero". Others refer to the expression "curramba" which reads the apocope of the city "Barranq" backwards as "q-rran-ba", then given the regulations of Castilian Spanish, they changed the "n" to "m" to precede the "b", finally giving rise to "curramba".. The thinker Agustín Nieto Caballero called Barranquilla "Ciudad de los Brazos Abiertos" ("City of the Open Arms") and Enrique Ancízar, president of the Colombian Society of Agriculture, called it "Faro de América" ("Beacon/Lighthouse of America.").

== Heraldry and symbols ==
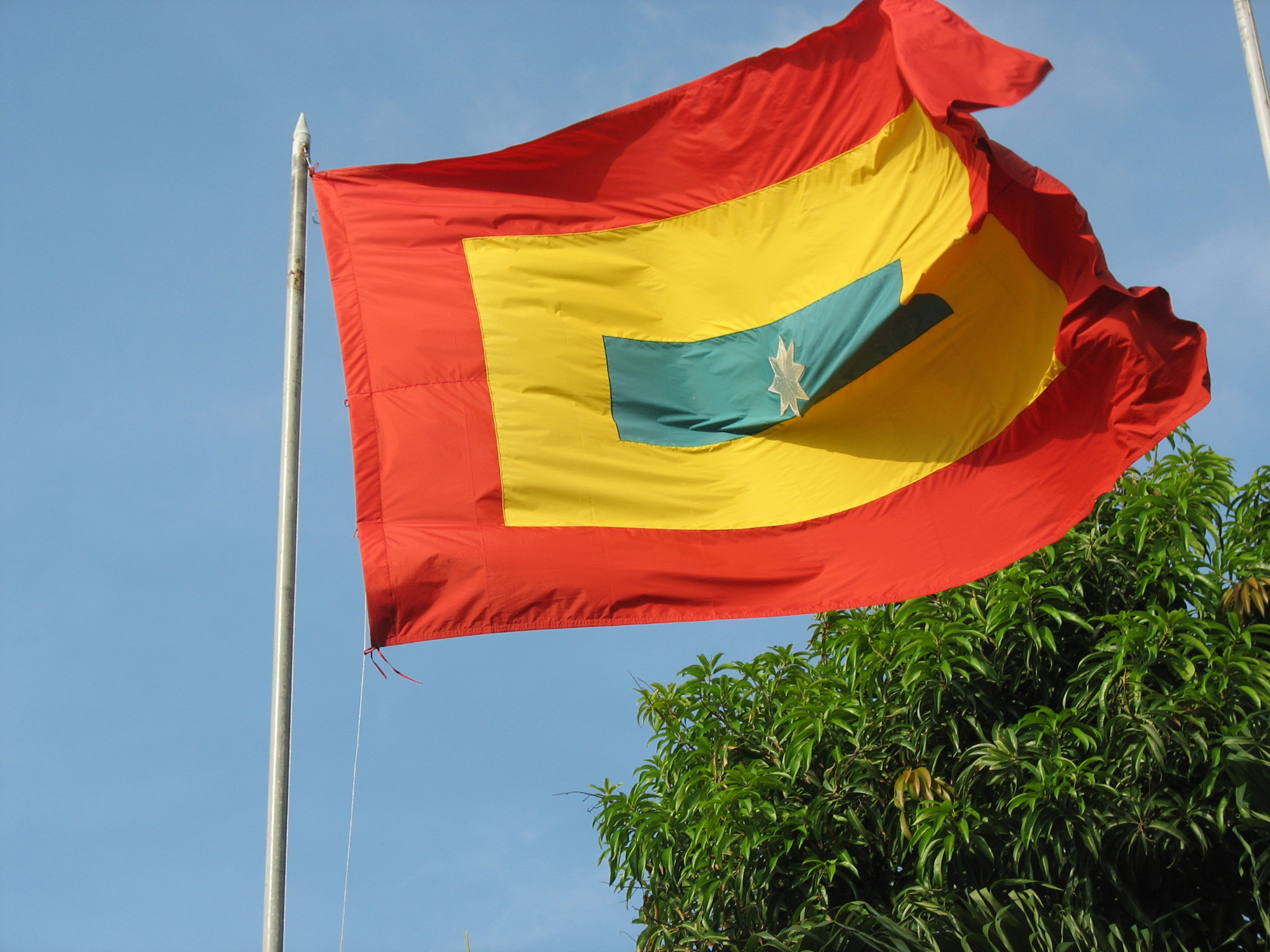
Flag of Barranquilla

Flag

In 1811, the patriots who obtained the independence of the Cartagenas adopted the current flag. It consists of three rectangles, red being the outermost, then yellow, and green in the center. Red symbolizes the blood of patriots; yellow, the sun of freedom and hope; and green, a proud home. In the centre, there is an eight-pointed silver star, which symbolizes the eight provinces of the confederacy. The flag was carried by Simon Bolívar during the campaign of Lower Magdalena in 1811. In 1814, the Congress of Tunja adopted it as the emblem of the United Provinces of New Granada. In 1910, the Council approved the flag for Barranquilla.

Coat of arms

The seal of the city was mentioned in the decree that granted Barranquilla the status of a city by Manuel Rodríguez Torices, the then President of the Sovereign State of Cartagena de Indias, as a reward for the determined and courageous patriots who participated in the defense of the independence of Cartagena de Indias against Santa Marta in 1813.

Anthem

The music and lyrics of Himno de Barranquilla were chosen in competition by the Sociedad de Mejoras Públicas and officially adopted as the anthem of the city by the Municipal Council in a meeting on 19 October 1942. The lyrics were written by the poet Amira de la Rosa (winner of the contest in 1942) and the music is of Panama, by Simón Urbina (1928).

Other symbols

The flowers Hibiscus rosa-sinensis, and Tabebuia rosea, and the animals Volatinia jacarina and iguana are used as other symbols of the city.

== History ==
=== Origins and colonial era ===
Unlike other cities in Colombia such as Cartagena or Bogotá D.C., Barranquilla was not founded during the Spanish colonial period and it was not founded on a pre-Columbian site. The first mention of the current territory of Barranquilla dates back to 1533 and was written by Gonzalo Fernández de Oviedo y Valdés. He describes the route of Pedro de Heredia, founder of Cartagena, just weeks before he founded that city, and says that this was a point of landing of canoes for the Indians of Santa Marta within the interior. They had two canoes full of dried shrimp as merchandise and went to the Magdalena River to trade with this commodity, salt and other things. However, the Kamash Indians were known to occupy the area and the settlement itself was established in about 1629. For this reason the city does not celebrate its foundation, but rather the date in which it was declared a town on April 7, 1813.

Barranquilla is honored as the origination of the aviation and airport. The first airline in South America was born in Barranquilla with the name of SCADTA which is today Avianca.

The home location of the Kamash indios (hispanized to Camacho or Camach) is known as the first permanent human settlement of Barranquilla. During the 16th century, an encomienda of captain Domingo de Santa Cruz was established, granted by the Spanish crown for his notable military performance. This encomienda disappeared in 1559, when it was in the hands of señora Ana Ximénez, widow of Santa Cruz, after the death of her husband. She became the victim of a disregardful violent act by the second encomendero of Galapa, Don Pedro de Barros I, when he arbitrarily grabbed all the Camacho population that could offer labour and took them to his encomienda.

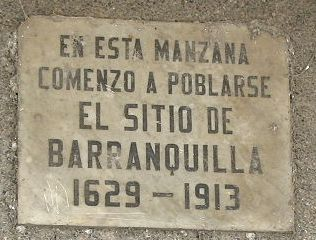
Plaque marking the block where people began to populate Barranquilla

Between 1627 and 1637, Hacienda San Nicolás de Tolentino was founded by Nicolás de Barros, great-grandson of Don Pedro de Barros I. The farm was established on the banks of the river channel. The original property area was 24.78 km^{2} (9.57 sq mi). Pedro Vasquez Buezo expanded the property to 41.3 km^{2} (15.9 sq mi). On this estate, Barros allowed his workers to build their homes and support their families, which helped further develop his field operations. After the death of Barros, the estate began to accommodate others, such as people who for reasons of health, age or cronyism with the hacienda owner were allowed to stay. There were also Indians from Malambo and Galapa. By 1681, the ranch was considered a village, known as Barrancas de San Nicolas. Before 1700, Barranquilla was occupied by Aguerra of Tierradentro and in 1772, the township was expanded by the same group, adding a Judge Counsel.

The origin of Barranquilla, promoted in the second half of the 19th century by the historian Domingo Malabet, was not supported by oral tradition nor scientifically validated. Blanco Barros' 1987 book on Northern Tierradentro and the origins of Barranquilla argued that the city had been founded by farmers from the neighboring town of Galapa who left their land, following their herds to the Magdalena River.

=== Era of Independence (1810–1823) ===
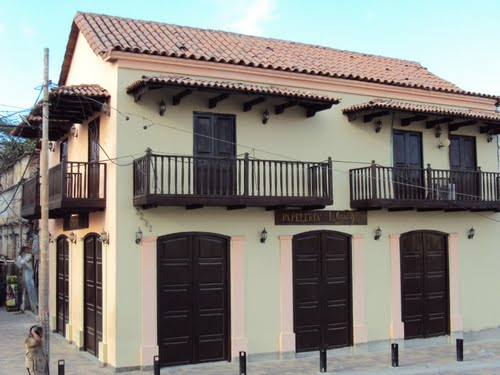
Casa Lacorazza, Saint Nicolas square.

In the era of the Colombian War of Independence, Barranquilla distinguished itself as a supporter of the pro-independence forces. In 1812, General Pierre Labatut attacked and defeated royalist forces at Sitioviejo and Sitionuevo. On April 7, 1813, which was later celebrated as "Barranquilla Day" ("el Día de Barranquilla"), the President-Governor of the Free and Independent State of Cartagena de Indias, Manuel Rodríguez Torices, granted the title of "villa" to the town, thereby allowing it to benefit from certain privileges, and making it the capital of the department of Barlovento (or Tierradentro), in recognition for the valor and patriotism displayed by the town for its defense of the pro-independence city of Cartagena de Indias against the royalist stronghold of Santa Marta.

In 1815, Joaquín Vallejo, a rich merchant, maintained a pro-independence battalion for three months at his own expense. When the Spanish forces under Colonel Valentín Capmani approached Barranquilla, its inhabitants resisted Capmani but were defeated on April 25, 1815. The population of the town was attacked and taken prisoner by the royalist troops, which also defeated Vallejo's pro-independence battalion. In the following 5–6 years, Barranquilla was a center for republican military operations. On October 10, 1821, the last royalist stronghold at Cartagena was defeated. At that time, Cartagena was capital of the Sovereign State of Bolivar, to which Barranquilla belonged. In the same year, Barranquilla was governed by its very first mayor, Agustín Del Valle, who carried out his duties from his own home, which later was converted in a military headquarters. On July 24, 1823, the naval Battle of Lake Maracaibo took place, which resulted in the final expulsion of Spanish royalist forces from Gran Colombia.

=== Republican Period ===
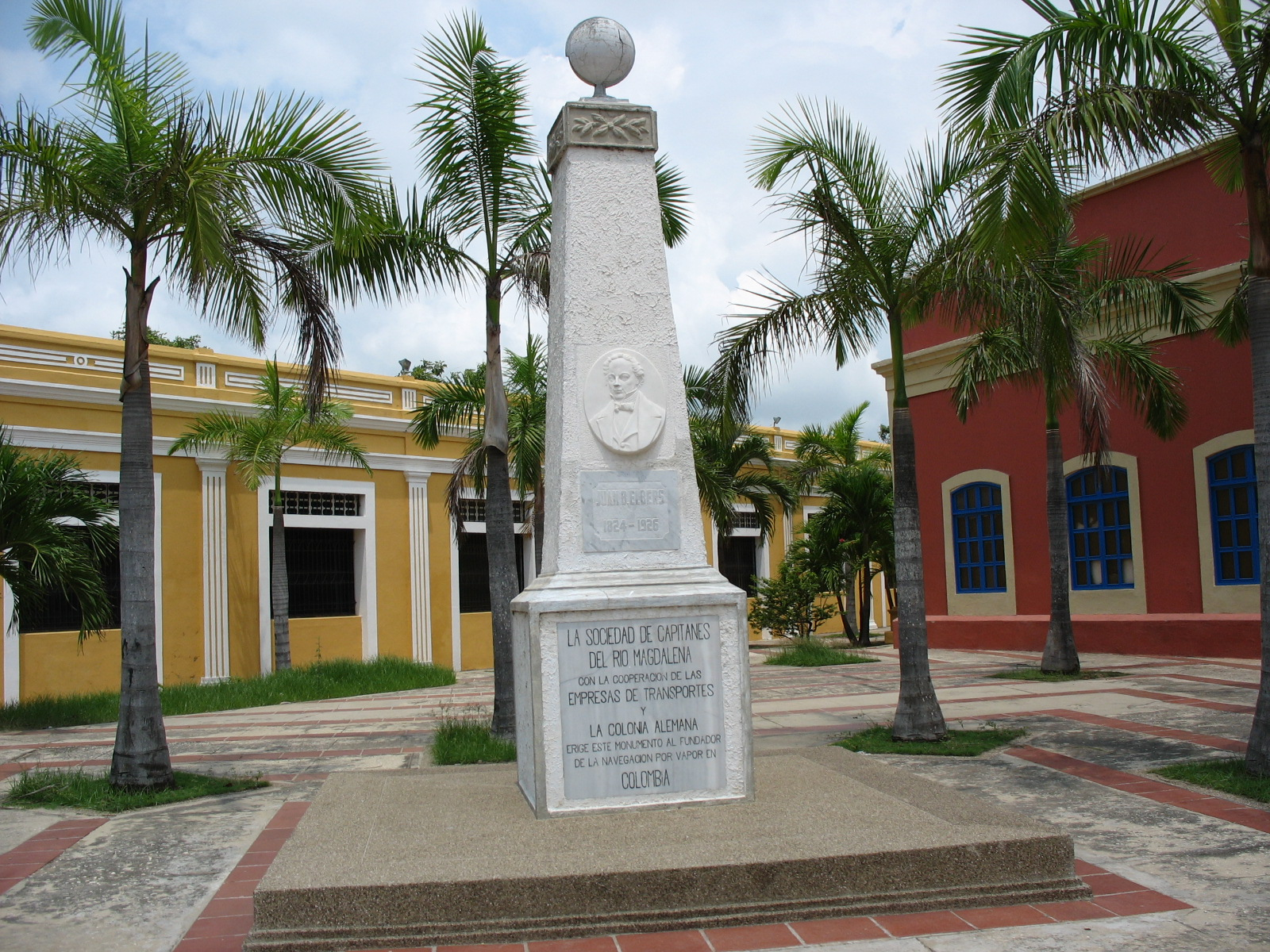
Obelisk in honor of Juan B. Elbers.

==== 19th century ====
The geographic area of Barranquilla did not include mineral or natural riches, and thus did not serve as a location where the Spanish maintained a permanent presence. Its importance was not appreciated until the mid-19th century, due to the introduction of steamships that navigated the Magdalena River by the German Juan Bernardo Elbers on behalf of Simón Bolívar at the founding of Gran Colombia in 1823. The route was opened on November 10, 1825. Barranquilla thus initiated a lively exchange of goods with cities and towns of the Colombian interior, as well as with international merchants, and it became a principal port for the export of coffee. With the establishment of the new nation of the Republic of New Granada in 1831, two revolutions began in Barranquilla. One was led by Policarpo Martínez, Antonio Pantoja, Lorenzo Hernández, Crispín Luque, Esteban Márquez y Santos de la Hoz against the dictatorship of Rafael Urdaneta. The second was led by General Ignacio Luque, who had crushed the first revolution.

In 1840, merchants and commercial carriers of Barranquilla tried to form an independent province, Cibeles, which was to comprise the cantons of Barlovento. They proclaimed Colonel Ramón Antigüedad as their leader. The primary objective was to rehabilitate the town of Sabanilla (also spelled Savanilla) as an independent port, as exports were controlled by the cities of Cartagena and Santa Marta. This rebellion was quickly crushed by troops from Cartagena. In 1845, the city was one of nine cantons that comprised the province of Cartagena.

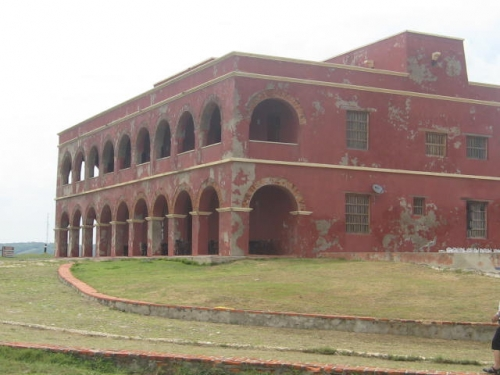
Castillo de Salgar.

At the end of the decade, in 1849, President Tomás Cipriano de Mosquera issued a decree that revitalized the bay of Sabanilla as a port to export goods. A customs house was built there, the Castillo de Salgar, to accommodate the new traffic. In early June 1849, an outbreak of cholera occurred in Barranquilla. It had originated in Cartagena, which in turn had received it from shipments coming from Panama.

On March 20, 1852, a law was passed by the Congress of New Granada that separated the province of Cartagena from the cantons of Barranquilla, Soledad, and Sabanalarga, which became part of the province of Sabanilla, with Barranquilla as the capital. On May 2, 1854, Tomás Cipriano de Mosquera arrived at Barranquilla, and the inhabitants supported him in his fight against the revolutionary José María Melo in Bogotá. On October 7, 1857, Barranquilla was granted the status of "ciudad" ("city") by the Constituent Assembly of the State of Bolívar; and in the same year, the Municipal Council of Barranquilla designated three zones in the city: Abajo del Río, Arriba del Río, and El Centro. Barranquilla formed part of the department of Sabanilla, one of the five departments that comprised the Sovereign State of Bolívar, whose formation had succeeded the province of Cartagena by law of June 15, 1857. During the time of the Granadine Confederation, Conservative General Joaquín Posada Gutiérrez attacked and defeated the city square in Barranquilla defended by the Liberal leader Vicente Palacio on November 6, 1859. Subsequently, the city would be recovered by the Liberal leader Manuel Cabeza on December 9.

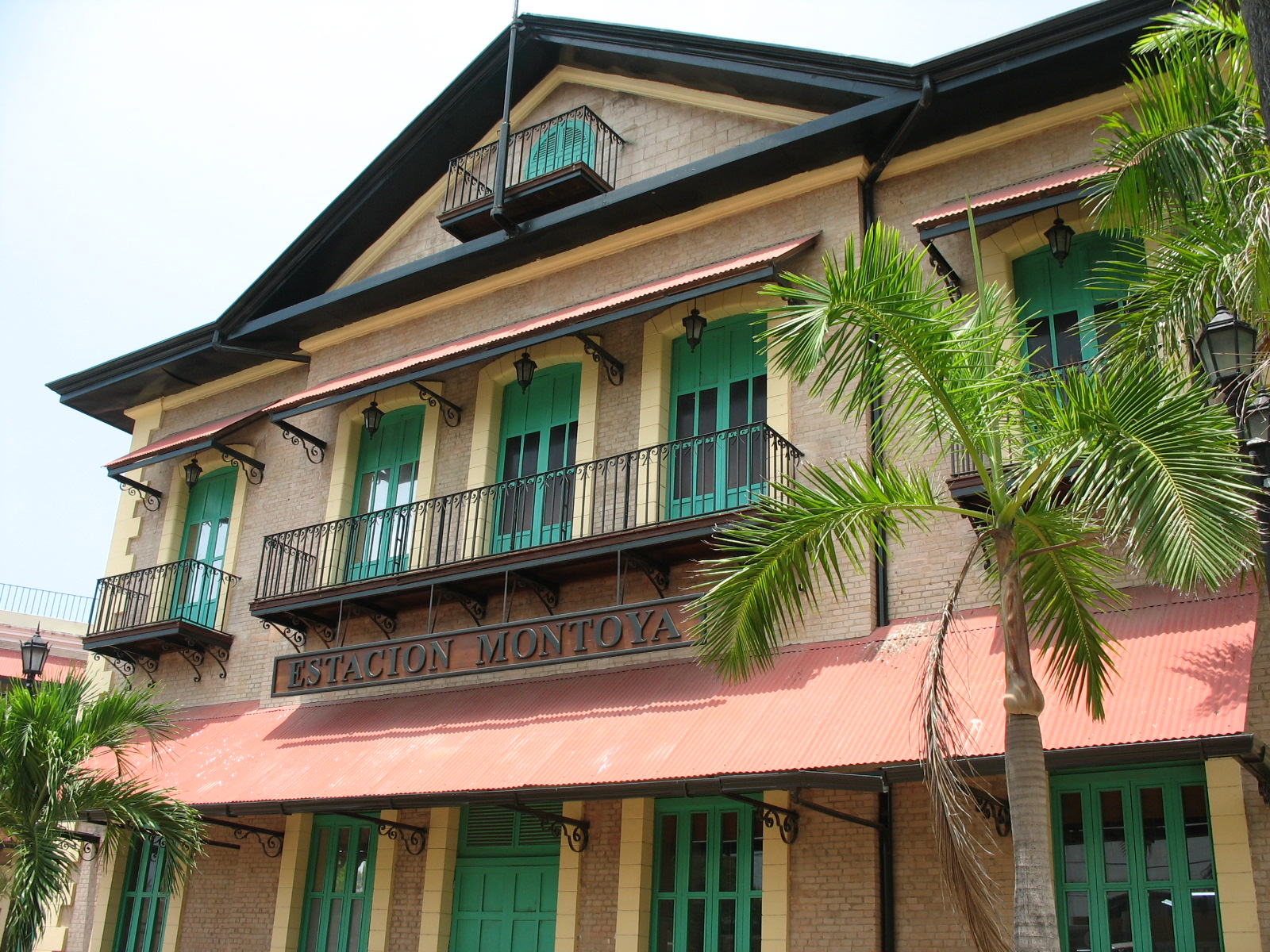
Montoya Station was the point of departure for the Barranquilla-Sabanilla Railway. Inaugurated in 1871, built by the Railway and Pier Company.

On January 25, 1861, General Juan José Nieto Gil, president of the State of Bolívar, launched a rebellion from Barranquilla. Barranquilla became the capital of a province of the same name by law on December 26, 1862, and the Sovereign State of Bolívar was divided into 12 provinces. At the establishment of the United States of Colombia, the growing commercial importance of Barranquilla led to the construction, between 1869 and 1871, of the Bolívar Railway (Ferrocarril de Bolívar), the first railway of the present-day Republic of Colombia. It linked Barranquilla and Sabanilla (Salgar), the latter being the location of the customs house. Due to the shallowness of the waters, it was necessary to extend the railway to Puerto Cupino, where the Cuban engineer Francisco Javier Cisneros built what was then one of the longest piers in the world, second only to the one in Southend-on-Sea, England.

In 1872, an epidemic with symptoms similar to those of cholera became manifest in the city. In 1876, an enormous amount of contraband entered the city from Salgar. In the last decades of the 19th century, Barranquilla experienced a series of advances represented by the founding of the Society of the Aqueduct in 1877, commissioning in 1884 of a mule-pulled tram, the installation of the first phones in Colombia on September 1, 1885. This telephone project had Mr. Orlando Flye, an electrical engineer from Ohio, as general contractor; and the foundation of the first private telephone service in Colombia, the Colombian-West Indian Mobile Company of Mobile by the U.S. citizen William Ladd.

It was at this time that the city became important for its booming business and its strategic geographic location, becoming the first port on a river of Colombia.

On January 6, 1885, revolutionary forces under General Ricardo Gaitán Obeso occupied the city. On February 11, the head of government, General Vicente Carlos Urueta, attacked an area defended by General Nicolás Jimeno Collante. Urueta triumphed over Obeso, but additional troops overtook Urueta. The modern Republic of Colombia was established the following year. Barranquilla became one of the 34 new departments, comprising the provinces of Barranquilla and Sabanalarga. During this time the city was established as the principal port of Colombia, helped along by the commissioning of the steam tramway in 1890 and the construction of the port of Puerto Colombia in 1893, which served as the Barranquilla port into the 20th century. The goods moved by rail to Barranquilla, and then by river to the interior.

==== 20th century ====
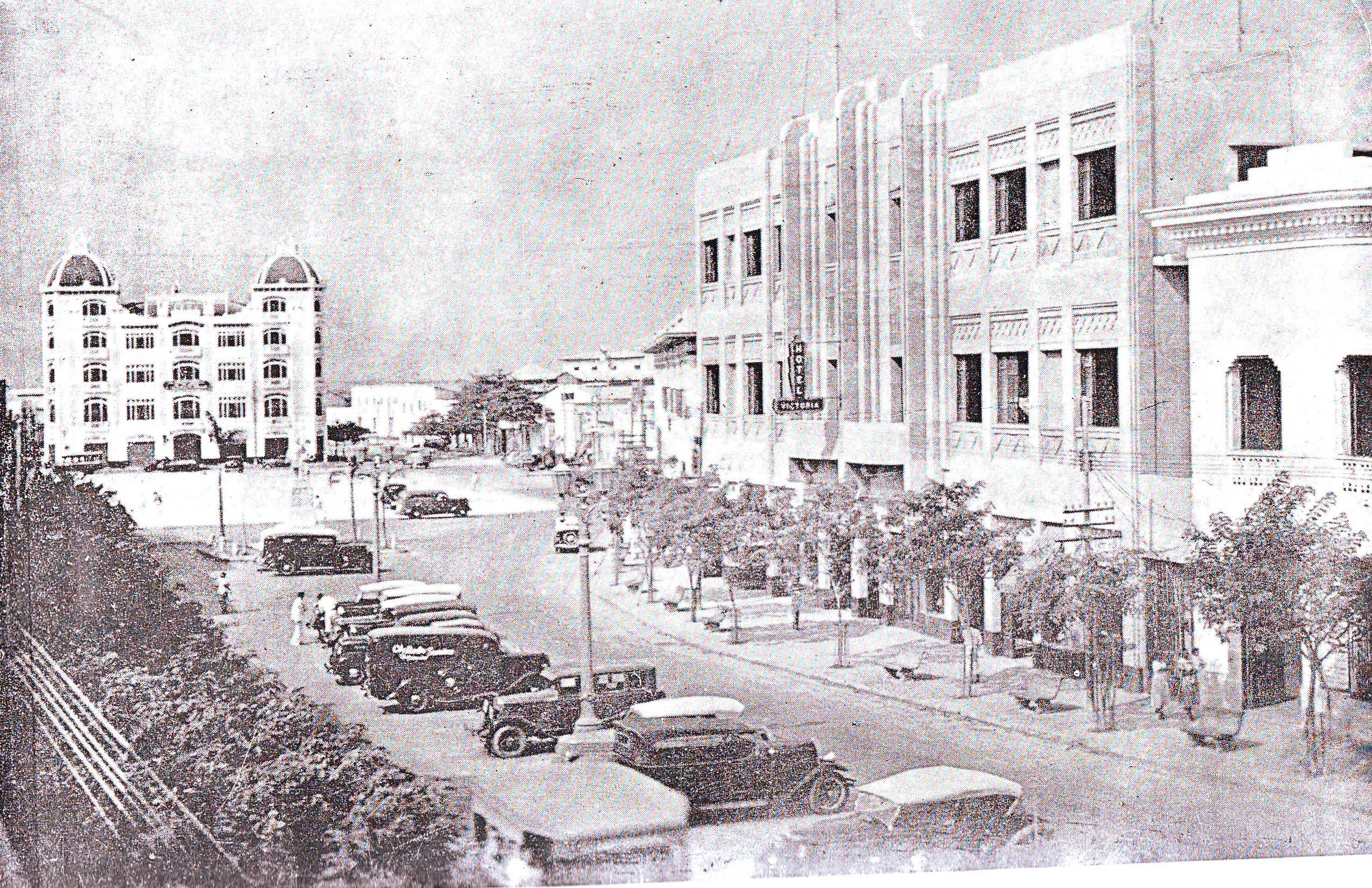
Paseo de Colón, a trade and business center in Barranquilla from the early 20th century until 1937 when the statue of Columbus was changed to that of Bolivar. The Palma building is in the background.

As part of the country's restructuring, President General Rafael Reyes, of the National Constituent and Legislative Assembly, through Act April 17, 11, 1905 created the Atlántico department, consisting of the provinces of Barranquilla and Sabanalarga, the department of Bolivar, and Barranquilla as the capital. However, in 1908, Atlántico department was changed to the Department of Barranquilla by Act 1. With the fall of General Reyes in 1909, the Department of Barranquilla was abolished by Act 65 of that year, with Barranquilla again integrating into the department of Bolivar. The National Constituent Assembly of 1910 enacted Law 21 on July 14, which definitively established the Department of Atlántico with Barranquilla again as capital.

With the city's economic boom, the Chamber of Commerce of Barranquilla was created on June 28, 1905. On September 7, 1909, a bill was passed by Congress recognizing the opening of Bocas de Ceniza as a national necessity. In June of the same year, "The Barranquillazo" coup was attempted by followers of General Ramón González Valencia against the General Jorge Holguín who was designated the rank of president of the republic after the resignation of the incumbent, General Reyes. The first flight of a Colombian airplane occurred in Barranquilla in December 1912, the plane being flown by the Canadian pilot George Schmitt. On December 10, 1919, the first commercial airline arrived in the Americas, and second in the world; Scadta later became Avianca. In June 1919, U.S. pilot William Knox Martin and Mario Santo Domingo inaugurated industrial airmail in Colombia with a flight between Barranquilla and Puerto Colombia, where Santo Domingo delivered the mail sack.

With the connections of the river and seaport reaching the country's interior and abroad, the city became in the second half of the 19th century through the early decades of the 20th century, one of the most cosmopolitan and multicultural cities of Colombia. Puerto Colombia became one of the longest piers in the world and the principal port of Colombia, nicknamed the "Golden Gate of Colombia".

A major inflow of Jewish immigrants, as well as foreigners from Syria, Palestine, Lebanon, France, Germany, the United States, Italy, China and Japan, invigorated the industry and helped to make Barranquilla a modern city. Of these immigrants, the Arab and Jewish from the Middle East immigrants were prominent, referred to wrongly as "Turks" by the Colombian people. As a result, during the first half of the twentieth century, Barranquilla became one of the fastest-growing cities of Colombia, growing at rates well above others; this was maintained until the 1970s.

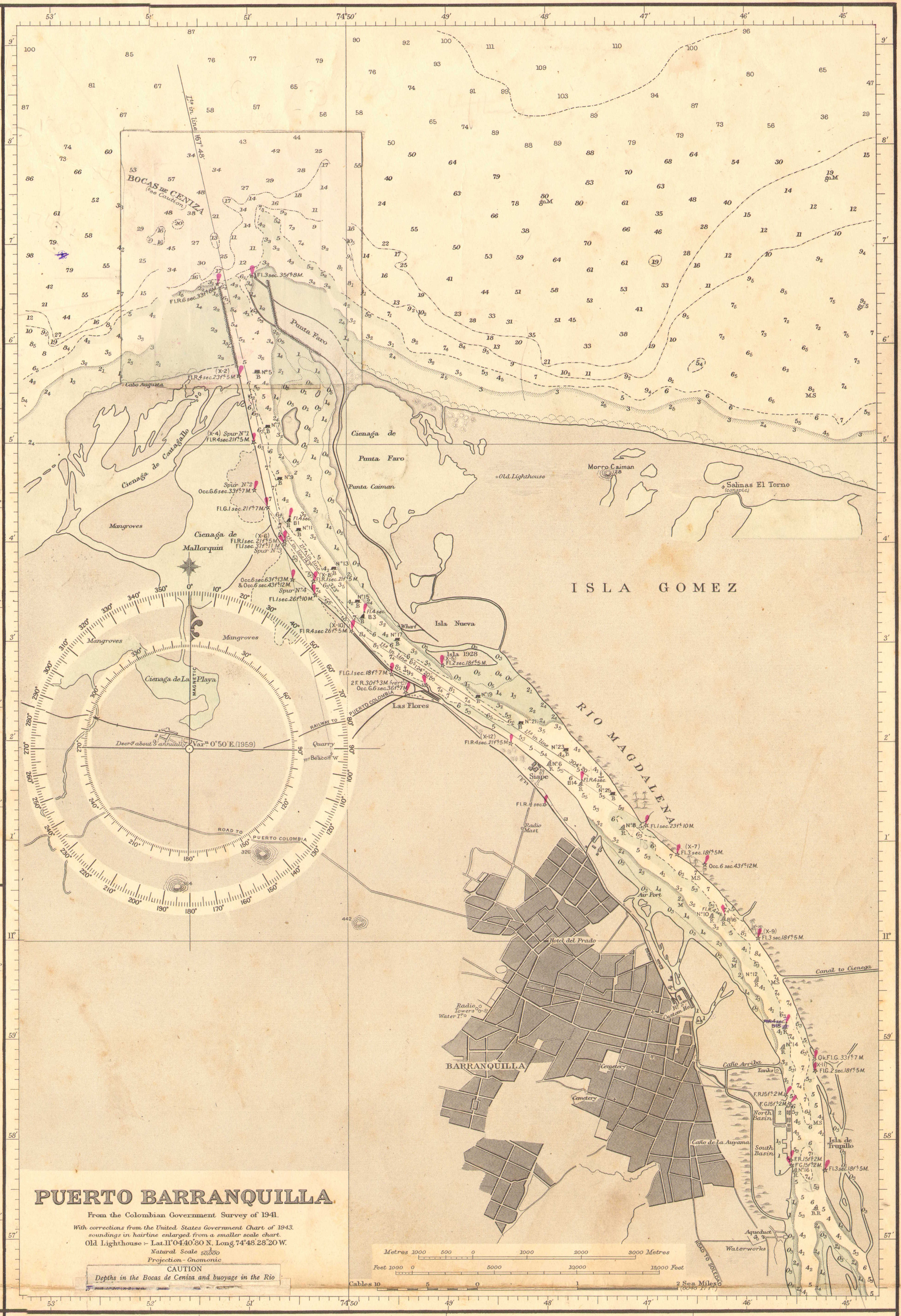
Nautical chart of Puerto Barranquilla from a 1941 survey, showing the Customs House and aqueduct

In this context, the office of Salgar was moved to Barranquilla, the Customs Administration of Barranquilla was constructed between 1919 and 1921, designed by the English architect Leslie Arbouin. Under economic dynamism, the city's business strength grew. This was attributed to its point of entry to the country by thousands of immigrants and many advances such as aviation. The city received from President Marco Fidel Suarez the title of "Golden Gate Republic". On January 12, 1919, amid great excitement in the Costa Caribe against Bogotá, Barranquilla joined the Costeña League.

In 1920, archaeologists revealed that Barranquilla is located on a vast historic necropolis. On June 8, 1924, while distributing flyers for the work of Bocas de Ceniza, the Tolima A-16 airplane, flown by German aviator Helmuth Von Krohn crashed, killing all six people aboard, including Ernesto Cortissoz, president of SCADTA.

In 1925, the first public companies based in the country were established in Barranquilla. The initial effect of the aqueduct that was built in 1929 was the arrival of piped water to 80% of the homes, while water supply coverage in Bogotá was 59%, and decreasing to 57.3% in Medellín, 74.8% in Cali, 21.4% in Cartagena, and 36.2% in Santa Marta. In 1927, the electricity service provided by the Electric Power Company Barranquilla addressed the needs of 10,300 homes, equivalent to 74% of the total. On February 4, 1925, Scadta acquired the planes large enough to make the first international flights, which took place in August of that year between Barranquilla and Key West, Florida, with stops in Central America, Mexico and Cuba.

In an era of significant progress for the city, the first private commercial radio station was founded in the country, the first station being the state HJN Colombia Bogotá.Elías Pellet Buitrago, grandson of the first U.S. consul in Barranquilla, had studied electrical engineering at a North American university. On December 8, 1929, he launched commercial radio in Colombia with the first broadcast of La Voz de Barranquilla, transmitting from his home with a homemade transmitter. Elías Pellet Buitrago, grandson of the first U.S. consul in Barranquilla, had studied electrical engineering at a North American university. On December 8, 1929, he launched commercial radio in Colombia with the inaugural broadcast of La Voz de Barranquilla, transmitting from his home. The programme included a Bach aria performed by Guido Perla on the violoncello, with Emirto de Lima on the piano; other classical works performed by the studio orchestra conducted by de Lima; a pasillo by Carlos Zagarra, director of Jazz Band Colombia; and a lecture on sports in Colombia. In 1934, a technician from Barranquilla and a Venezuelan poet founded Emisora Atlántico with the support of Miguel Ángel Blanco Solís, the Costa Rican consul, who owned a pharmaceutical laboratory in the city. The radio station hosted performances by the Orquesta Sosa in its radio theatre and, from 1940 onwards, supported the Emisora Atlántico Jazz Band. In 1946, Emigdio Velasco, the Venezuelan consul and local agent for RCA Victor and Kodak, founded La Voz de la Víctor. Following Pellet's premature death in 1939, Velasco also purchased La Voz de Barranquilla and merged the two stations to form Emisoras Unidas. Also in 1936, as well, the italian businessman Clemente Vasallo Manfroni and his son, who had some technical expertice, founded La Voz de la Patria.

On April 10, 1931, in a mutiny against hunger and unemployment, the people of Barranquilla destroyed the Theatre Columbia. On August 16, 1933, the Senate approved the contract for Bocas de Ceniza and work was completed in 1936 with President Alfonso Lopez inaugurating the Maritime Terminal Barranquilla. In 1935, the construction of a municipal football stadium enabled hosting of the National Game III.

From the 1960s until the early 1980s, the city plunged into an economic decline, largely due to the failure of the political class as well as the collapse of major sectors of industrial activity. In 1958, the government created the first zone of Colombia in Barranquilla. The city's expansion to reach neighboring towns led to the creation of the Metropolitan Area of Barranquilla in 1981. On August 18, 1993, the Congress of Colombia, through Legislative Act Number August 1, 17, 1993, conferred to Barranquilla the category of "Special District, Industrial and Port".

=== 21st century ===
In the 21st century, the city has been working on new projects to restore itself as the strategic capital within the country. Rapid urban growth, including the mass migration of peasants to the main cities, attracted by economic development, has led to the demand of numerous proposals to accommodate such growth. Barranquilla has always been famous for its chaotic urban planning, understandable given its spontaneous origin as a port and the reality of high administrative corruption which has hampered the channeling of resources for building an urban centre of greater structure and dimensions. The presentation of a new infrastructure, changes in local and regional administration, decentralization since 1991, international pressure to open markets, and competition between the other major Colombian cities will bring about considerable development in Barranquilla into the 21st century.

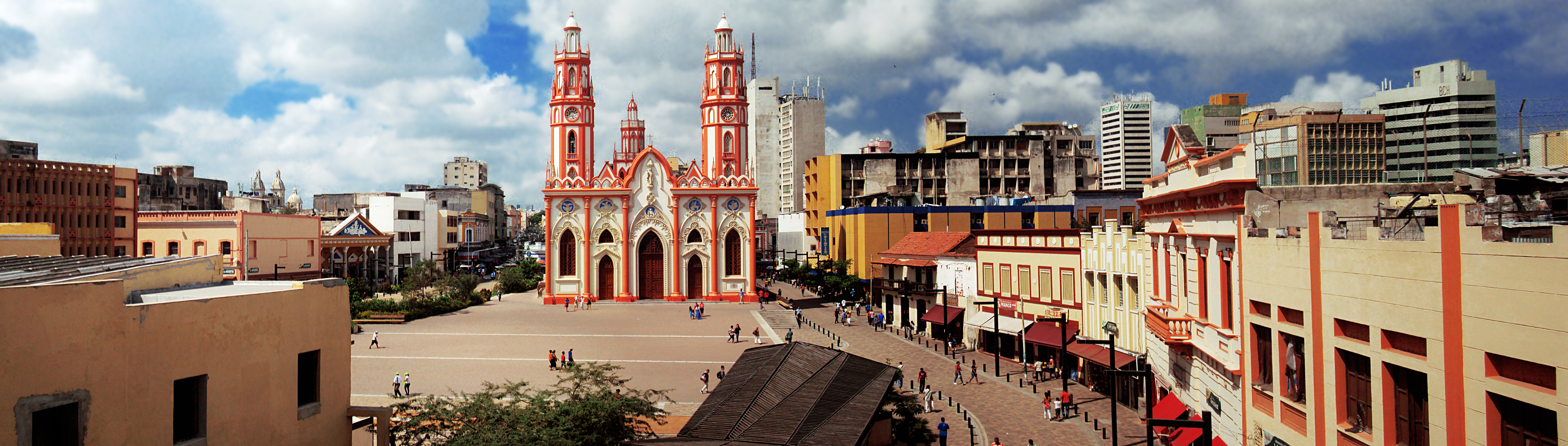
Panorama of Barranquilla's Plaza de San Nicolás in 2012.

== Geography ==
Map of Barranquilla

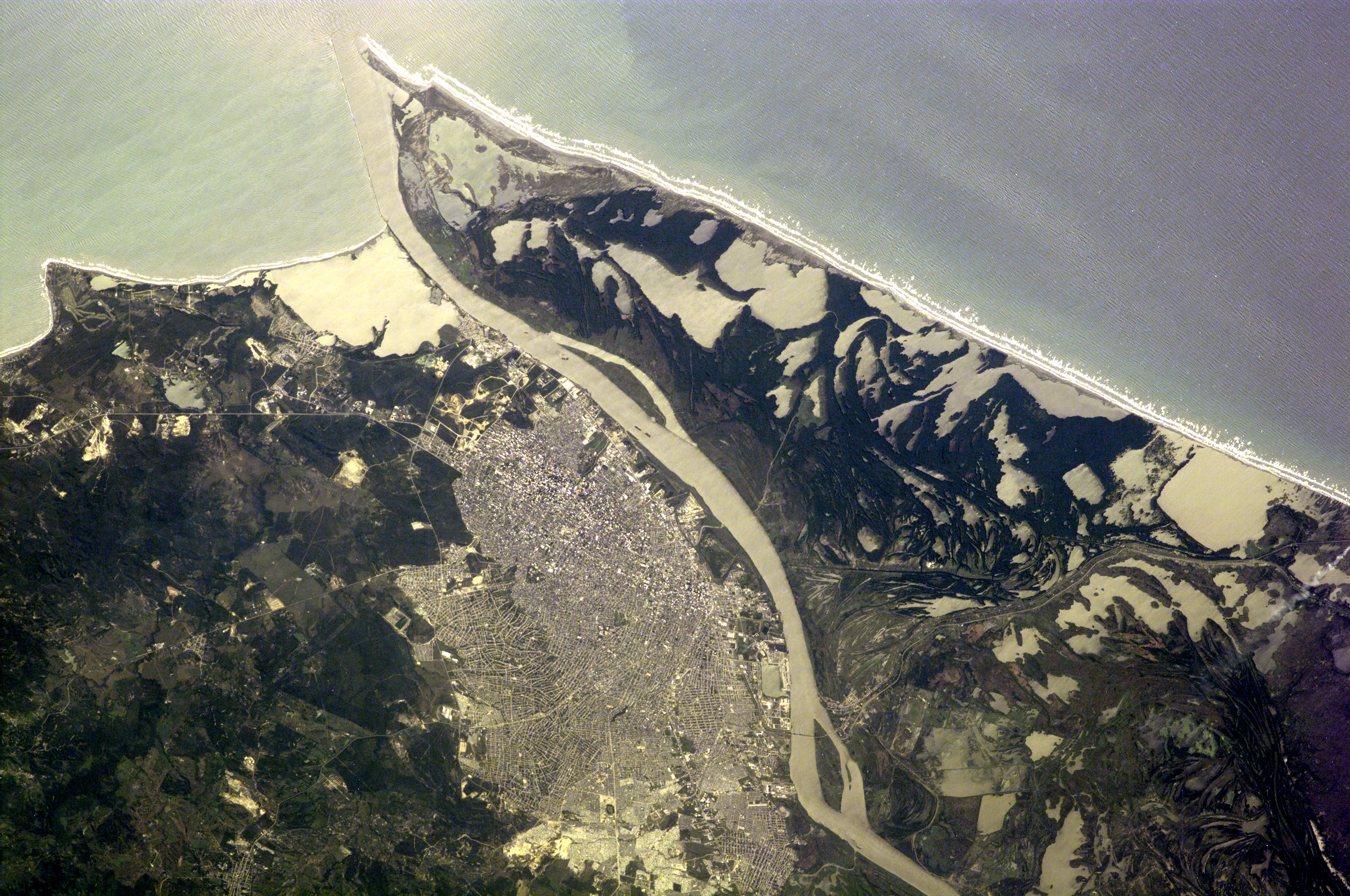
Satellite View of Barranquilla.

The city is located in the northeastern corner of the department of the Atlantic, on the west bank of the Magdalena River, 7.5 km (4.7 mi) (originally 25 km (16 mi) before rapid urban growth) from its mouth in the Caribbean. The municipality covers an area of 154 km^{2}, equivalent to 4.5% of the area of the Atlántico Department. Barranquilla is located at latitude 10° 59' 16" north of the Equator and longitude 74° 47' 20" west of Greenwich, with reference to the Plaza de la Paz, ground zero of the city. The urban area is built on a slightly inclined plane whose extreme heights, according to the Codazzi, are 4 m and 98 m east to west. Other sources say the slopes accidental heights of up to 120 meters outside the city. According to Google Earth, the height of the city varies between 0 m in the western breakwater, up to maximum 142 m in the neighborhood of Los Nogales. Politically, Barranquilla is limited to the east by the department of Magdalena (through the middle of the Magdalena River), north to the town of Puerto Colombia and the Caribbean Sea, west with the municipalities of Puerto Colombia, Galapa and Tubará and south with the municipality of Soledad.

The main river is the Magdalena River; other rivers include the Arriba, Los Tramposos, La Ahuyama, La Tablaza and Las Compañías; streams run through the barrios of Rebolo, Santo Domingo, Las Américas y el Bosque; El Lindero, El Platanal, El Salado, El Salado 2, Don Juan, Hospital, La Paz, Bolívar, Felicidad, Coltabaco, Siape, Calle 92, and the streets 8, 15, 19, 51, 53, 58, 65 and 71. There are also the marshes of Mallorquín Swamp. The north of Barranquilla, from 11° N, corresponded to a region "with good chances of rain water infiltration," while the southern part appears as "low infiltration, poor soil and possible flooding from rain."

The geological composition of the region is the Tertiary period (Miocene and Pliocene) in western hills and Quaternary (Pleistocene and Holocene) in the flatter, like the sole of river. According to the Geographic Institute Agustin Codazzi, the materials in the area are mainly Quaternary alluvial, lacustrine, fluviolacustre. The land ranges from banks, dikes, terraces, valleys, narrow, small alluvial fans, to marshes, swamps, flats and hills. The materials of the Tertiary (Miocene and Pliocene) are in the western hills, and presented as varied slopes.

=== Climate ===
Barranquilla has a tropical savanna climate (Köppen Aw); it is hot all-year-round, with high levels of relative humidity. The average temperature is 28.4 °C or 83.1 °F. Daytime temperatures usually remain around 32 °C or 89.6 °F. Nevertheless, from late November to early April, trade winds more or less cool it to a more comfortable temperature during daylight. During the evening and through the night, temperature can change due to the strong winds it receives. Rainy seasons are from April to June and from August to November, when some streets flood producing "arroyos" (streams) that can be very dangerous, given the lack of appropriate rain drainage in some sectors of the city. The average annual high temperature is around 33C and a low of 24C with precipitation averaging around 920mm.

Climate data for Barranquilla (Ernesto Cortissoz International Airport), elevation 14 m (46 ft), (1991–2020)
Month	Jan	Feb	Mar	Apr	May	Jun	Jul	Aug	Sep	Oct	Nov	Dec	Year
Record high °C (°F)	38.2 (100.8)	37.6 (99.7)	37.8 (100.0)	39.5 (103.1)	39.3 (102.7)	39.8 (103.6)	39.2 (102.6)	39.0 (102.2)	38.4 (101.1)	38.6 (101.5)	38.4 (101.1)	39.5 (103.1)	39.8 (103.6)
Mean daily maximum °C (°F)	31.6 (88.9)	31.8 (89.2)	32.4 (90.3)	33.3 (91.9)	33.5 (92.3)	33.3 (91.9)	33.1 (91.6)	33.5 (92.3)	33.3 (91.9)	32.8 (91.0)	32.4 (90.3)	32.1 (89.8)	32.8 (91.0)
Daily mean °C (°F)	28.5 (83.3)	28.7 (83.7)	29.1 (84.4)	29.9 (85.8)	30.0 (86.0)	29.9 (85.8)	29.8 (85.6)	29.9 (85.8)	29.7 (85.5)	29.1 (84.4)	29.1 (84.4)	29.0 (84.2)	29.4 (84.9)
Mean daily minimum °C (°F)	23.8 (74.8)	24.1 (75.4)	24.4 (75.9)	25.0 (77.0)	25.1 (77.2)	25.0 (77.0)	24.8 (76.6)	24.7 (76.5)	24.1 (75.4)	24.3 (75.7)	24.4 (75.9)	24.0 (75.2)	24.5 (76.1)
Record low °C (°F)	18.0 (64.4)	18.0 (64.4)	18.8 (65.8)	18.8 (65.8)	18.0 (64.4)	20.5 (68.9)	19.4 (66.9)	20.9 (69.6)	20.0 (68.0)	14.9 (58.8)	18.5 (65.3)	19.5 (67.1)	14.9 (58.8)
Average precipitation mm (inches)	1.1 (0.04)	1.8 (0.07)	1.5 (0.06)	28.9 (1.14)	126.9 (5.00)	87.5 (3.44)	87.7 (3.45)	107.0 (4.21)	173.5 (6.83)	159.1 (6.26)	114.9 (4.52)	30.2 (1.19)	920.5 (36.24)
Average precipitation days (≥ 1.0 mm)	0.2	0.1	0.4	2.5	7.1	6.6	5.7	7.7	10.5	11.3	7.6	1.3	61.1
Average relative humidity (%)	79	78	77	79	81	82	81	82	84	86	84	81	81
Mean monthly sunshine hours	285.2	248.4	244.9	210.0	189.1	201.0	217.0	207.7	171.0	167.4	186.0	244.9	2,572.6
Mean daily sunshine hours	9.2	8.8	7.9	7.0	6.1	6.7	7.0	6.7	5.7	5.4	6.2	7.9	7.1
Source: Instituto de Hidrologia Meteorologia y Estudios Ambientales

Climate data for Barranquilla (Flores Las), elevation 2 m (6.6 ft), (1981–2010)
Month	Jan	Feb	Mar	Apr	May	Jun	Jul	Aug	Sep	Oct	Nov	Dec	Year
Mean daily maximum °C (°F)	29.1 (84.4)	28.9 (84.0)	29.4 (84.9)	30.1 (86.2)	31.0 (87.8)	31.3 (88.3)	30.9 (87.6)	31.2 (88.2)	31.4 (88.5)	31.0 (87.8)	30.7 (87.3)	29.7 (85.5)	30.4 (86.7)
Daily mean °C (°F)	26.7 (80.1)	26.6 (79.9)	26.9 (80.4)	27.5 (81.5)	28.2 (82.8)	28.4 (83.1)	28.2 (82.8)	28.3 (82.9)	28.2 (82.8)	28.0 (82.4)	27.9 (82.2)	27.3 (81.1)	27.7 (81.9)
Mean daily minimum °C (°F)	25.2 (77.4)	25.1 (77.2)	25.4 (77.7)	25.6 (78.1)	26.0 (78.8)	26.2 (79.2)	26.0 (78.8)	26.0 (78.8)	25.7 (78.3)	25.6 (78.1)	26.0 (78.8)	25.7 (78.3)	25.7 (78.3)
Average precipitation mm (inches)	0.8 (0.03)	1.3 (0.05)	1.3 (0.05)	11.7 (0.46)	95.6 (3.76)	72.0 (2.83)	44.1 (1.74)	86.9 (3.42)	135.7 (5.34)	167.1 (6.58)	98.6 (3.88)	35.1 (1.38)	750.1 (29.53)
Average precipitation days (≥ 1.0 mm)	0	0	1	2	7	6	5	7	10	13	7	2	55
Average relative humidity (%)	82	82	82	83	83	83	83	83	83	83	83	82	83
Mean monthly sunshine hours	244.9	220.2	220.1	195.0	176.7	189.0	210.8	210.8	177.0	170.5	189.0	217.0	2,421
Mean daily sunshine hours	7.9	7.8	7.1	6.5	5.7	6.3	6.8	6.8	5.9	5.5	6.3	7.0	6.6
Source: Instituto de Hidrologia Meteorologia y Estudios Ambientales

=== Flora ===
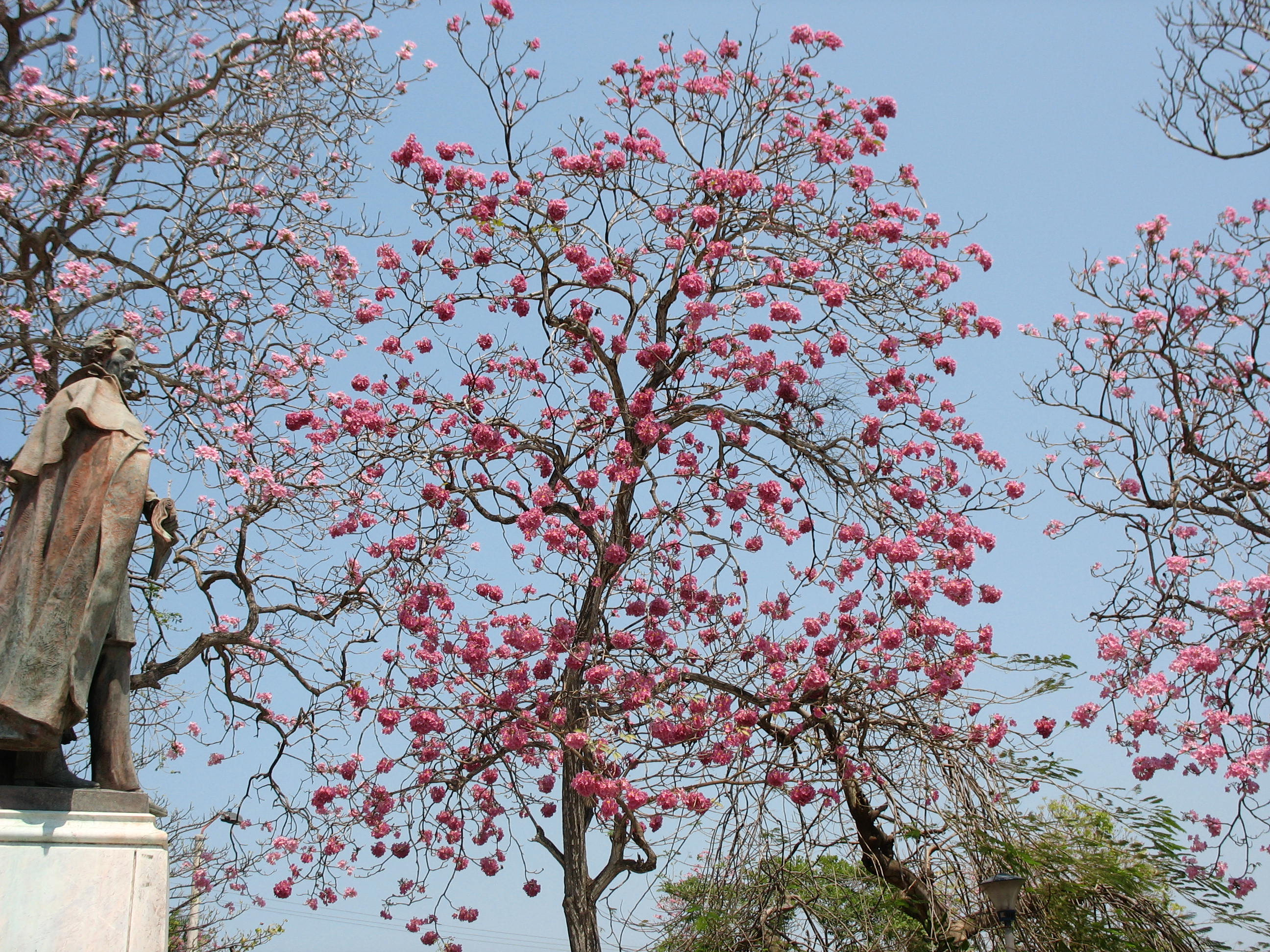
Roble morado, the emblematic tree of Barranquilla (Parque Santander)

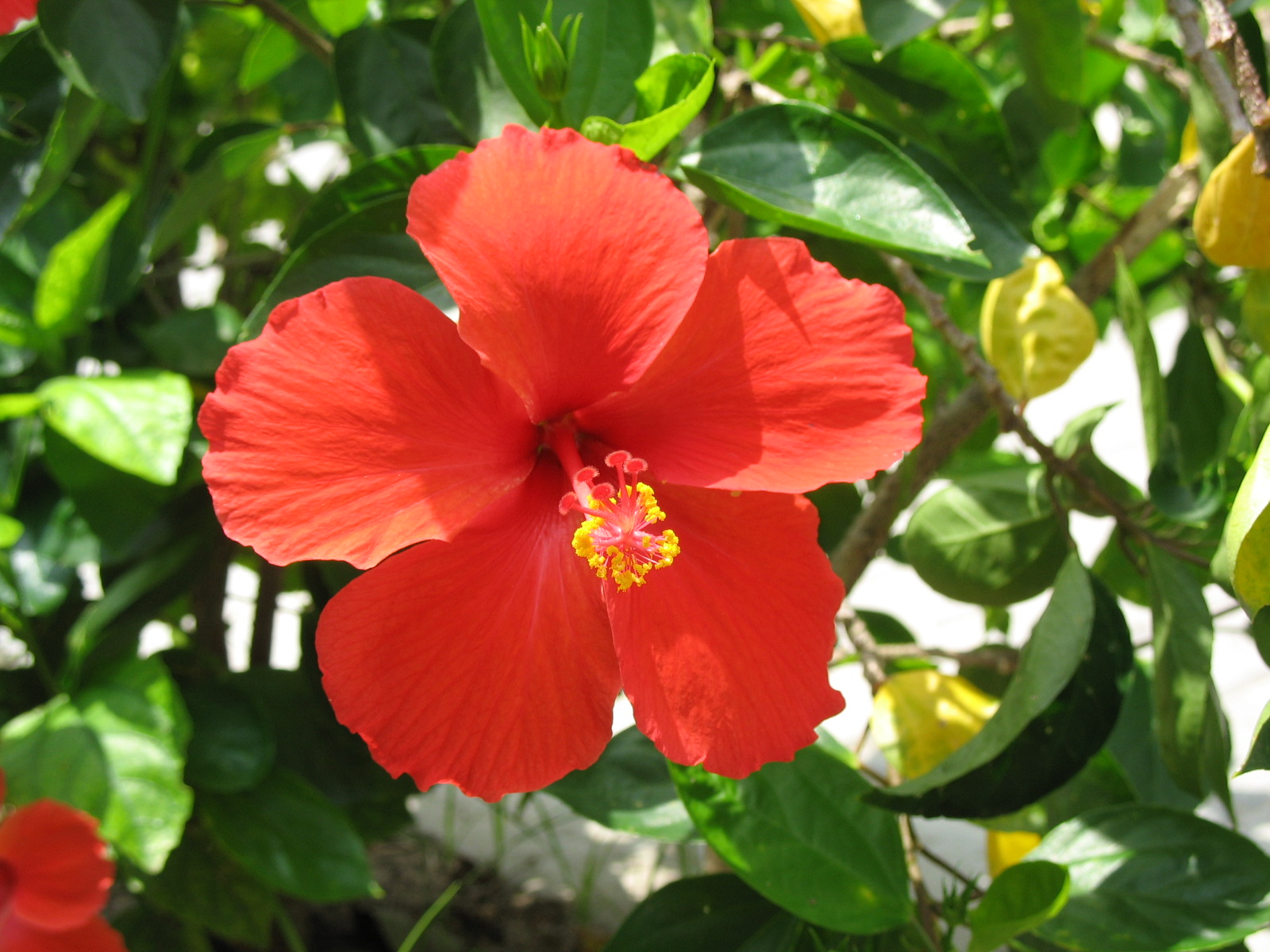
Cayena, symbolic flower of Barranquilla

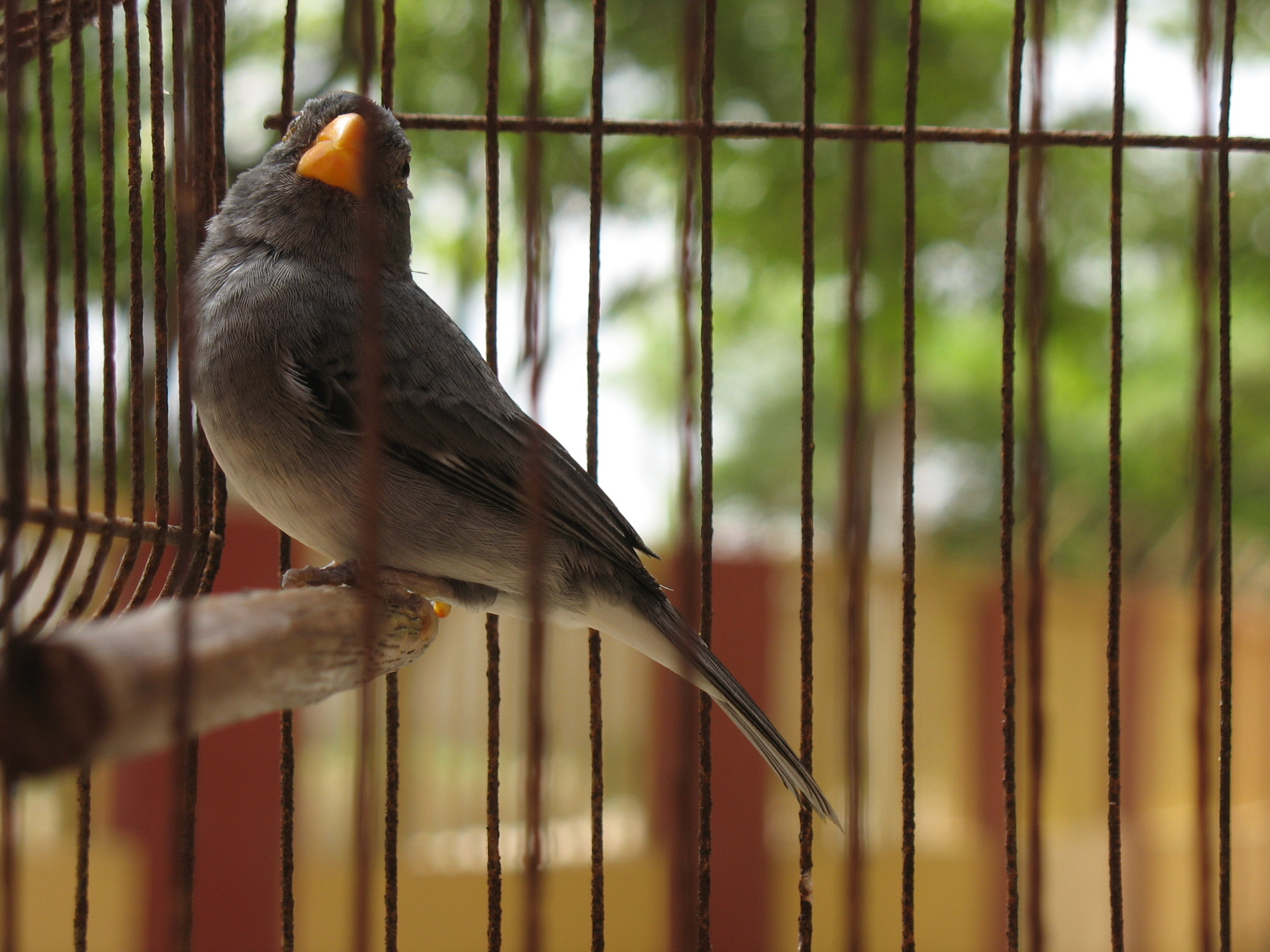
Mochuelo, symbolic bird of Barranquilla

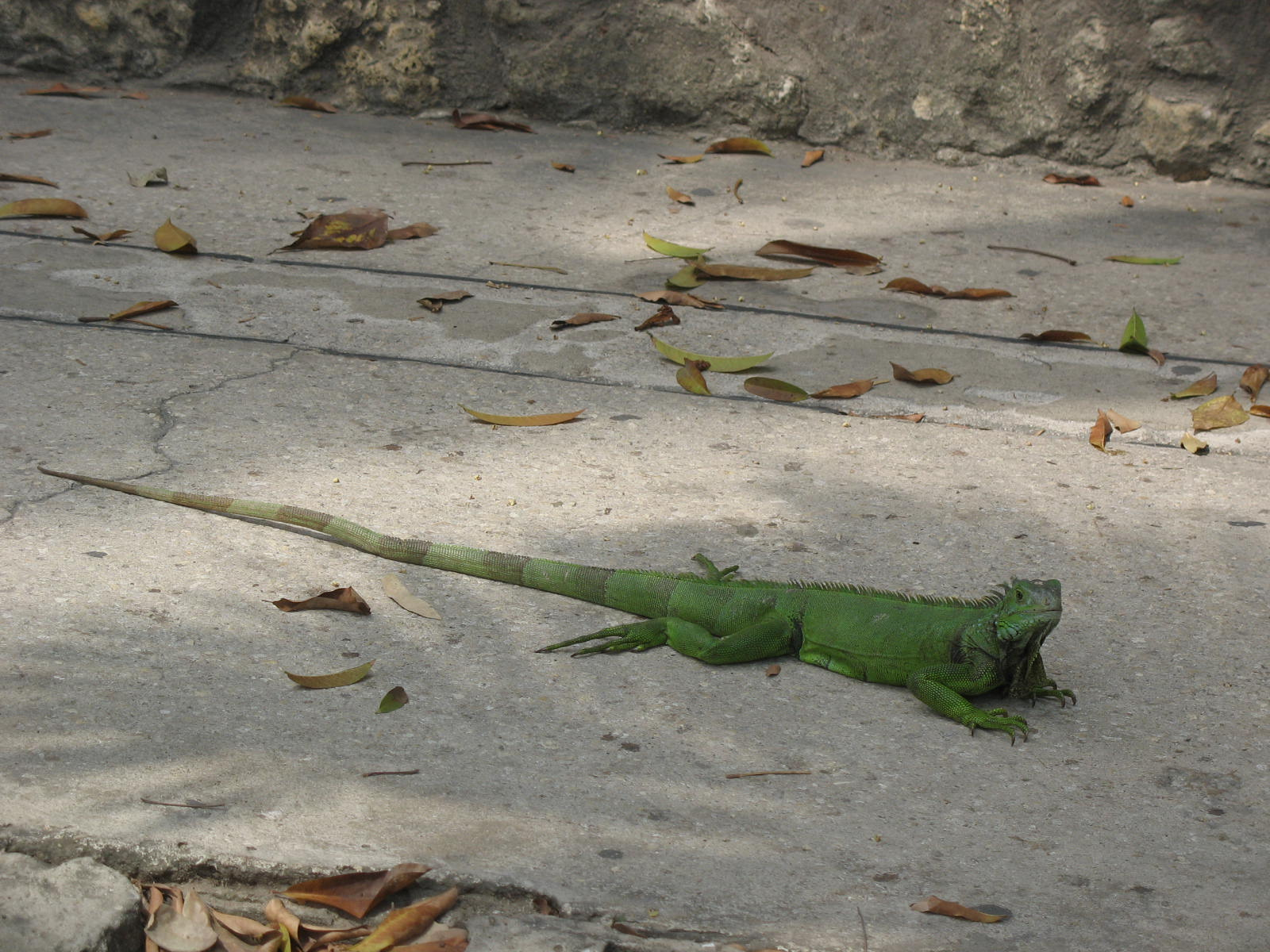
Iguana in the area around Hotel El Prado

According to the Agustín Codazzi Geographic Institute (Instituto Geográfico Agustín Codazzi), Barranquilla has a dry tropical forest vegetation (according to the Holdridge life zones), which includes species including cacti, mangroves, Acanthocereus, Prosopis juliflora, divi-divi, Tabebuia rosea, and flamboyant or flame tree.

In the fertile lands watered by the Magdalena River, one can find species such as Eichhornia azurea, Typha angustifolia, Heliconia, Eichhornia crassipes, Anacardium excelsum, and Lecythis minor.

Found in urban areas are such tree species as Gliricidia sepium, Cassia nodosa, Bursera simaruba, Terminalia catappa, Casuarina equisetifolia, and species of Ceiba such as Ceiba pentandra, Hura crepitans and Ficus elastica, Ochroma pyramidale, Licania tomentosa, Ficus religiosa, Ficus benghalensis, Spathodea campanulata, Enterolobium cyclocarpum, Samanea saman, Gmelina arborea, Ficus nitida, Cordia sebestena, Tabebuia chrysantha, Kigelia pinnata, Swietenia macrophylla, Thespesia populnea, Sterculia apetala, Cocos nucifera, Ficus benjamina, Guazuma ulmifolia, Erythrina variegata, Crescentia cujete, Cassia fistula, Azadirachta indica, Sapindus saponaria and various palms such as Roystonea regia and Phoenix roebelenii.

Fruit trees in the area include Mangifera indica, Manilkara zapota, Melicoccus bijugatus, Psidium littorale, Coccoloba uvifera, Ziziphus vulgaris, Annona squamosa, Tamarindus indica, Spondias purpurea, Anacardium occidentale, guanábana, and Citrus x limon.

=== Fauna ===
Some animal species can be found in the city such as birds like owls, wrens, and parrots; fish such as mullet in the marshes; insects such as butterflies, flies, mosquitoes, gnats, cockroaches and termites; mammals such as feral dogs and cats, monkeys, rodents and possums (zorrochuchos); reptiles such as iguanas, snakes and tortoises. In some rural areas horses, donkeys, cattle, pigs and goats are raised.

=== Ecology and natural resources ===
Barranquilla contains important ecosystems such as the Magdalena River, Mallorquín Swamp and the Eastern pipe system. The completion of the construction of embankments of Bocas de Ceniza in 1936 resulted in the deterioration of the swamp, which was originally four marshes, and led to the deterioration of the nearby beaches of Puerto Colombia.

The stream of La Victoria flows through Barranquilla Botanical Garden, a community and recreational green area for public use with an approximate area of 7 hectares, located in the southeastern part of the city, in the neighborhood of La Victoria. The lush vegetation and clear water springs have allowed a suitable habitat for rare native plant and animal species found within the city.

=== Environmental pollution ===
Air quality

Under wind, atmospheric pollutants move in a north and northeasterly direction, and in times of low winds or moderate winds, are more evenly distributed over the city. The most polluting industrial processes in the city are ammonium sulfate, cement, plaster, and paper pulp. The emission of gases from motor vehicle traffic is more critical in the central district, where much of the business is. The main source of air pollution is from the vehicles at 34% and then industry with 18%. The pollutants emitted by vehicles are carbon monoxide (89.12%), sulfur dioxide (0.23%), hydrocarbons (6.46%), oxides of nitrogen (3.82%) and other particles (0. 37%). To help remedy this problem, several state enterprises and private sector have supported a project to convert liquid fuel vehicles to natural gas. Furthermore, the city has installed more than 12 service stations catering to natural gas vehicles. Barranquilla is the fourth-biggest atmospheric polluter from industry.

According to research conducted by the Institute of Hydrology, Meteorology and Environmental Studies of Colombia (IDEAM), monthly concentrations in Barranquilla of particulate matter smaller than 160 micrograms per cubic meter exceeds the highest international standard allowed of 70. The causes of this problem lie heavily with the poor quality of petrol and diesel used by vehicles in the city, with record levels of 5,000 ppm (parts per million sulfur) and 4,500 ppm respectively, when there are countries whose rates do not even exceed 50.

Water pollution

All of the surface water systems of Barranquilla, the Magdalena River, the Mallorquín swamp, and the system of pipes and streams in the east are subject to water pollution as well as the dumping of raw sewage and solid waste by individuals. The environmental effect has been reduced mainly on the Mallorquín swamp with the construction of ponds and the Estación Depuradora de Aguas Residuales (EDAR) by the Triple A.

Noise

The maximum noise allowed is 64 decibels for residential areas, and 70 to 75 for commercial and industrial areas. In the center of Barranquilla, the noise generated by vehicular traffic and commercial activity in peak hours can reach levels above 90 decibels, making it a risk factor for population health.

=== Administration ===
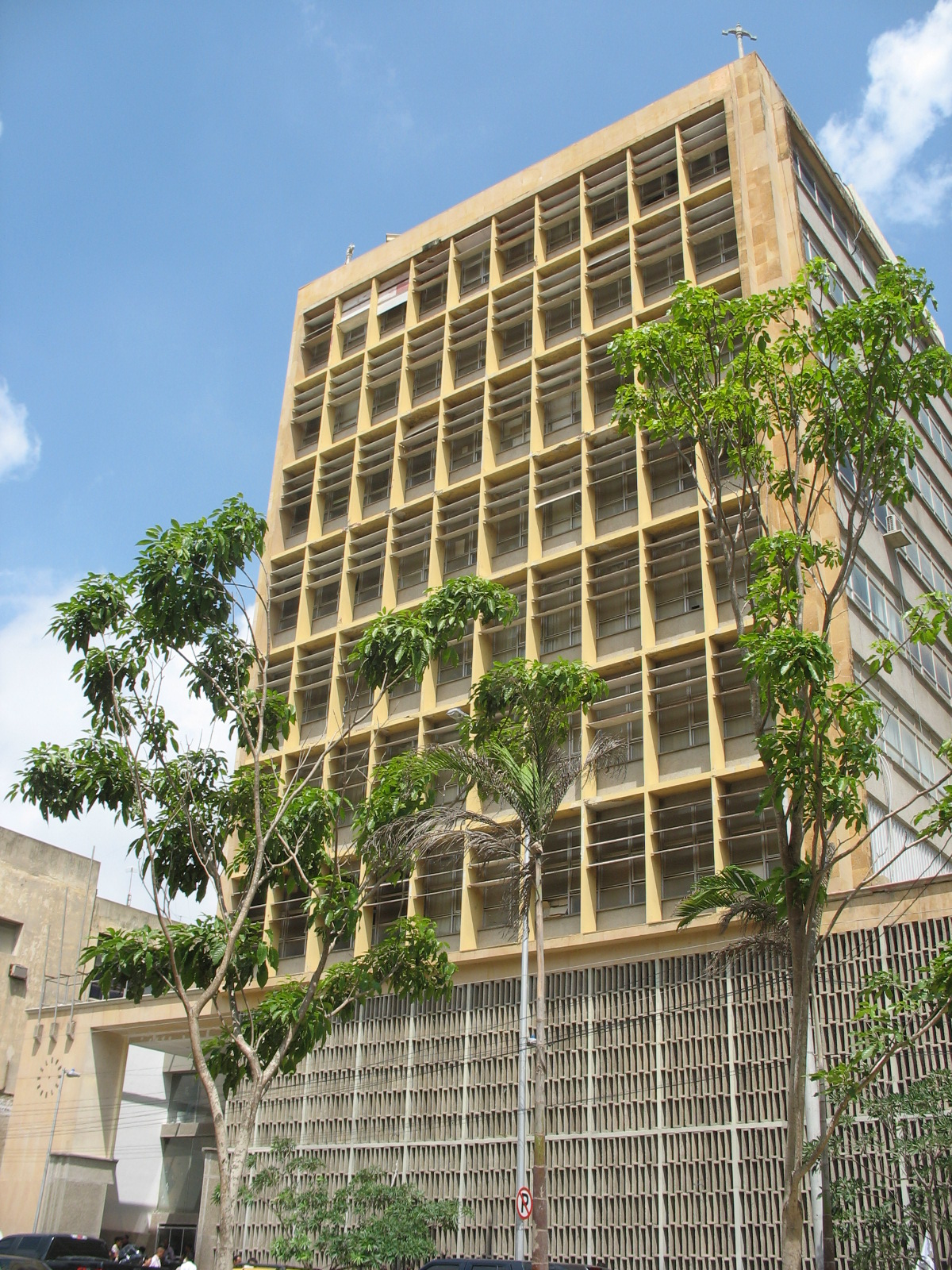
District mayor's building

=== Branches of public power ===
Barranquilla is administered by the Mayor, elected for 4 years, who represents the executive branch, to pronounce decrees and acts as legal representative, in the court and district court. The current mayor Jaime Pumarejo Heins began his term of office in 2020. Also appointed are local mayors which have the coordinating role of taking district government administrative action at each location along with the mayors elected by popular vote, which integrate local administrative boards of the localities in which the city is divided.

The governor of Atlántico, Elsa Noguera since 2020, has its offices in the city and influence in the management of some critical entities such as, Universidad del Atlántico, the Library Department and the Regional Autonomous Corporation of the Atlántico, involving environmental management.

Administratively, the mayor of Barranquilla is backed by the central government, with agencies reporting directly to the Mayor. Some administrative and technical departments are responsible for advising the mayor, the control of urban and administrative aspects and the development of different urban projects.

Central administration	Decentralized entities
Despacho del Alcalde	Área Metropolitana de Barranquilla
Secretaría de Gobierno	Terminal Metropolitana de Transportes de Barranquilla S.A.
Secretaría de Planeación	Transmetro S.A.
Secretaría de Hacienda	Promotora del Desarrollo del Distrito Central de Barranquilla S.A. – Promocentro
Secretaría de Salud	Empresa de Desarrollo Urbano de Barranquilla – Edubar
Secretaría de Infraestructura Pública	Departamento Técnico Administrativo del Medio Ambiente de Barranquilla – Damab
Secretaría de Gestión Social	Carnaval S.A.
Secretaría de Educación
Secretaría de Recreación y Deportes
Secretaría de Movilidad
Secretaría de Control Urbano y Espacio Público
Secretaría de Cultura, Patrimonio y Turismo
Secretaría General

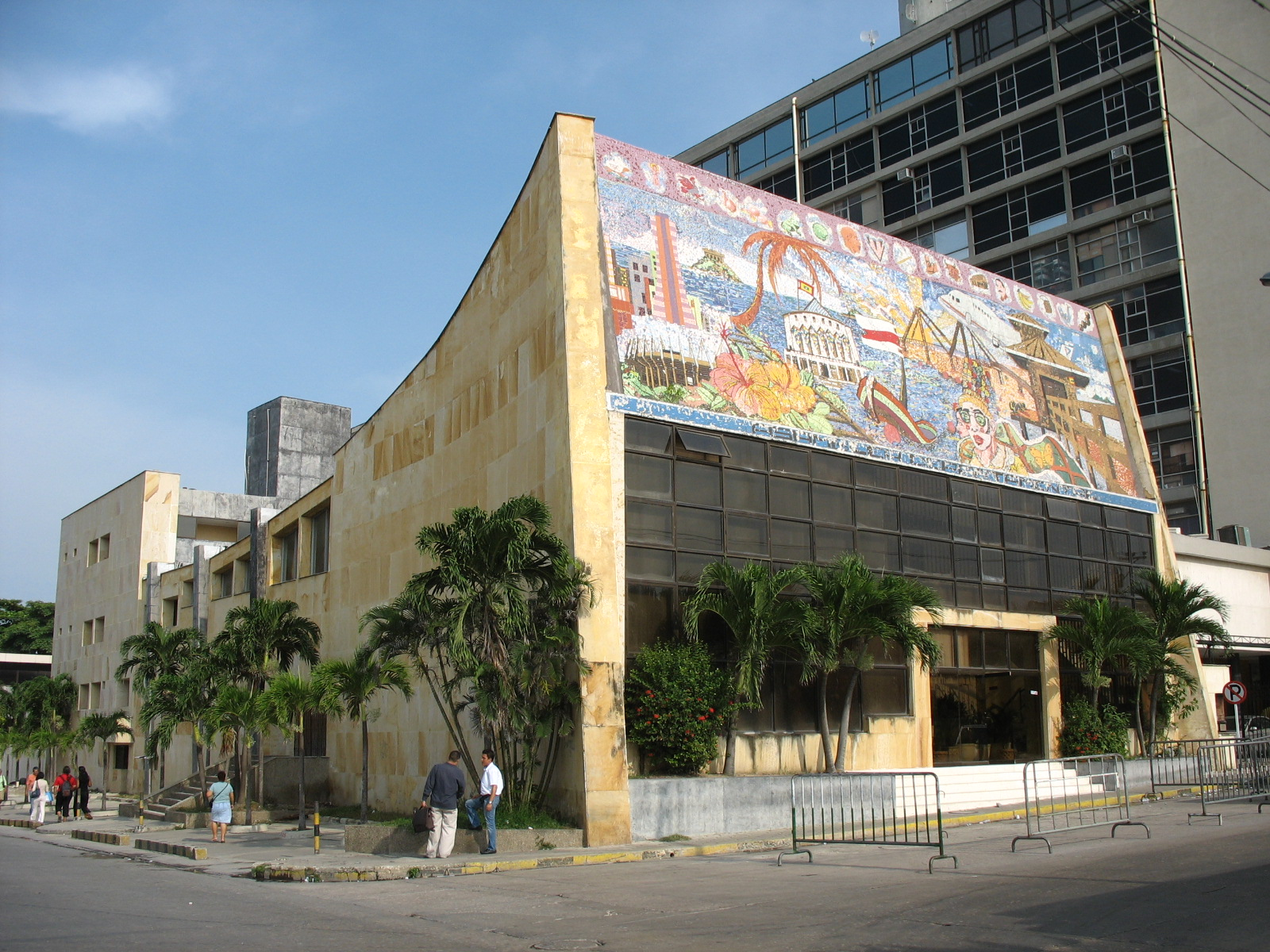
Assembly of the Atlántico Department.

As for the judiciary branch, the Judicial District of Barranquilla is formed by the Superior Court of the Judicial District of Barranquilla, the Judicial Circle of Barranquilla, the Judicial Circle of Soledad and the Judicial Circle of Sabanalarga. The Court is formed by the Civil-Family Chamber (six judges), the Laboral Chamber (five judges) and the Penal Chamber (three judges). The Judicial Circle of Barranquilla is formed by the civil, family, laboral and penal tribunals of Barranquilla, as well as the combined tribunals of Galapa, Juan de Acosta-Tubará, Piojó and Puerto Colombia

=== Administrative divisions ===
Map of the localities	Urban-rural map
Localities: 1. Riomar 2. Norte-Centro Histórico 3. Sur Occidente 4. Sur Oriente.	Corregimientos: 1. La Playa (Eduardo Santos) 2. Juan Mina.

According to Act 768 of 2002, the district of Barranquilla is politically and administratively divided into five localities: Riomar, Norte-Centro Histórico, Sur Occidente, Sur Oriente and Metropolitana. Each locality is co-managed by the elected mayors and local mayors (one per locality) appointed by the Mayor. This choice is regulated by the District Administration. At the same time, localities are subdivided into barrios, there are 188 barrios or wards and approximately 7,611 blocks.

Legislative Act 01 of 1993 established that the district of Barranquilla also includes the neighborhood Las Flores, the village of La Playa (formerly belonging to the municipality of Puerto Colombia), and the western breakwater of Bocas de Ceniza in the Magdalena River Swamp area of Mallorquín/ The local authority also includes the village of Juan Mina

=== Metropolitan Area ===
The Metropolitan Area of Barranquilla is an urban agglomeration located in the northeastern corner of Atlántico. Its main focus is the district of Barranquilla and Soledad peripheral municipalities, Galapa, Puerto Colombia, Malambo. It was created by Decree Law 3104 December 14, 1979, article 16, and put into operation by ordinance 028 December 11, 1981. Its operation is governed by Act 128 of 1994 ("Ley Orgánica de Áreas Metropolitanas"). It is run by the Metropolitan Board, which is chaired by the Metropolitan Mayor, who in turn is the district mayor of Barranquilla. In addition, the Board is composed of the governor of the Atlántico department, the mayors of suburban municipalities, the representative council of Barranquilla and one representative from the councils of the associated municipalities. The director of the entity is the Secretary of the Metropolitan Board.

Municipality	Area km^{2}	Population (Census 2018)	Population (Estimate 2023)	Population density 2023 (pop/km^{2})	Altitude m	Distance from Barranquilla (km)	Metropolitan map
Barranquilla	154	1.206.319	1.327.209	8.618	18	0	border Área urbana Área Metropolitana de Barranquilla
Soledad	67	603.999	692.799	10.340	5	3	border Área urbana Área Metropolitana de Barranquilla
Malambo	108	128.203	145.396	1.346	10	12	border Área urbana Área Metropolitana de Barranquilla
Puerto Colombia	93	49.264	55.890	601	5	13	border Área urbana Área Metropolitana de Barranquilla
Galapa	98	60.708	69.820	712	83	8	border Área urbana Área Metropolitana de Barranquilla
Total	520	2.048.493	2.291.114	4.406	—	—	border Área urbana Área Metropolitana de Barranquilla
Census 2005, 2014 estimates by DANE – Official municipal websites							border Área urbana Área Metropolitana de Barranquilla

=== Defense ===
Barranquilla is home to the First Division of the National Army of Colombia, formed in part by the Second Mechanised Brigade, which consists of the No. 4 Battalion Mechanized Infantry Battalion. No. 2 Military Police Battalion. No. 2 Support Services, and other units. In the nearby town of Malambo is located the No.3 Air Combat Command (Cacom 3) of the Colombian Air Force, which is responsible for ensuring the constitutional order and to exercise national sovereignty over air operations and whose jurisdiction comprises the mainland north of Colombia, the island area of the Archipelago of San Andrés, Providencia and Santa Catalina and Colombian territorial waters in the Caribbean Sea.

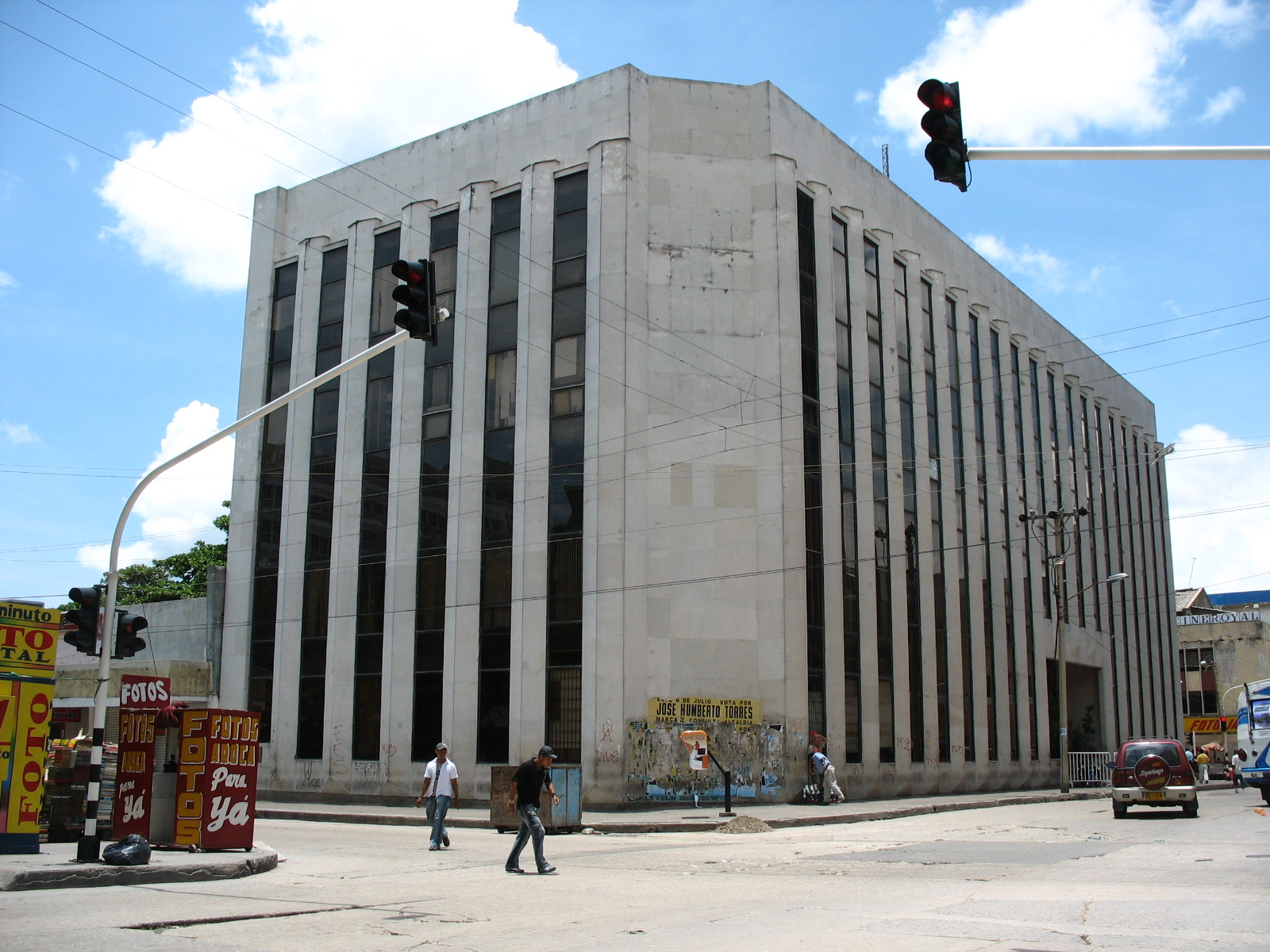
Attorney General's Office

=== State institutions ===
In Barranquilla are the most important regional headquarters of many Colombian state entities, which are intended to develop programs and strategies defined by national guidelines. Aside from the Judiciary and Superior courts of Barranquilla these include the Attorney General's Office, Attorney General's Office, Comptroller General's Office, the Administrative Security Department, National Apprenticeship Service, the National Civil Registry, National Police, Army, Superintendent of Public Services Ombudsman, Telecom, Instituto de Seguros Sociales (ISS), Instituto Colombiano de Bienestar Familiar, Colombian Institute of Educational Credit and Technical Studies Abroad Solidarity Network, National Bureau of Statistics, Chamber of Commerce, Bureau of Revenue and Customs (DIAN) Banco de la República, the Colombian Air Force), Navy, Codazzi, the Supreme Judicial Council, National Compensation Fund (Cajanal), among others.

== Economy ==
Economic indicators
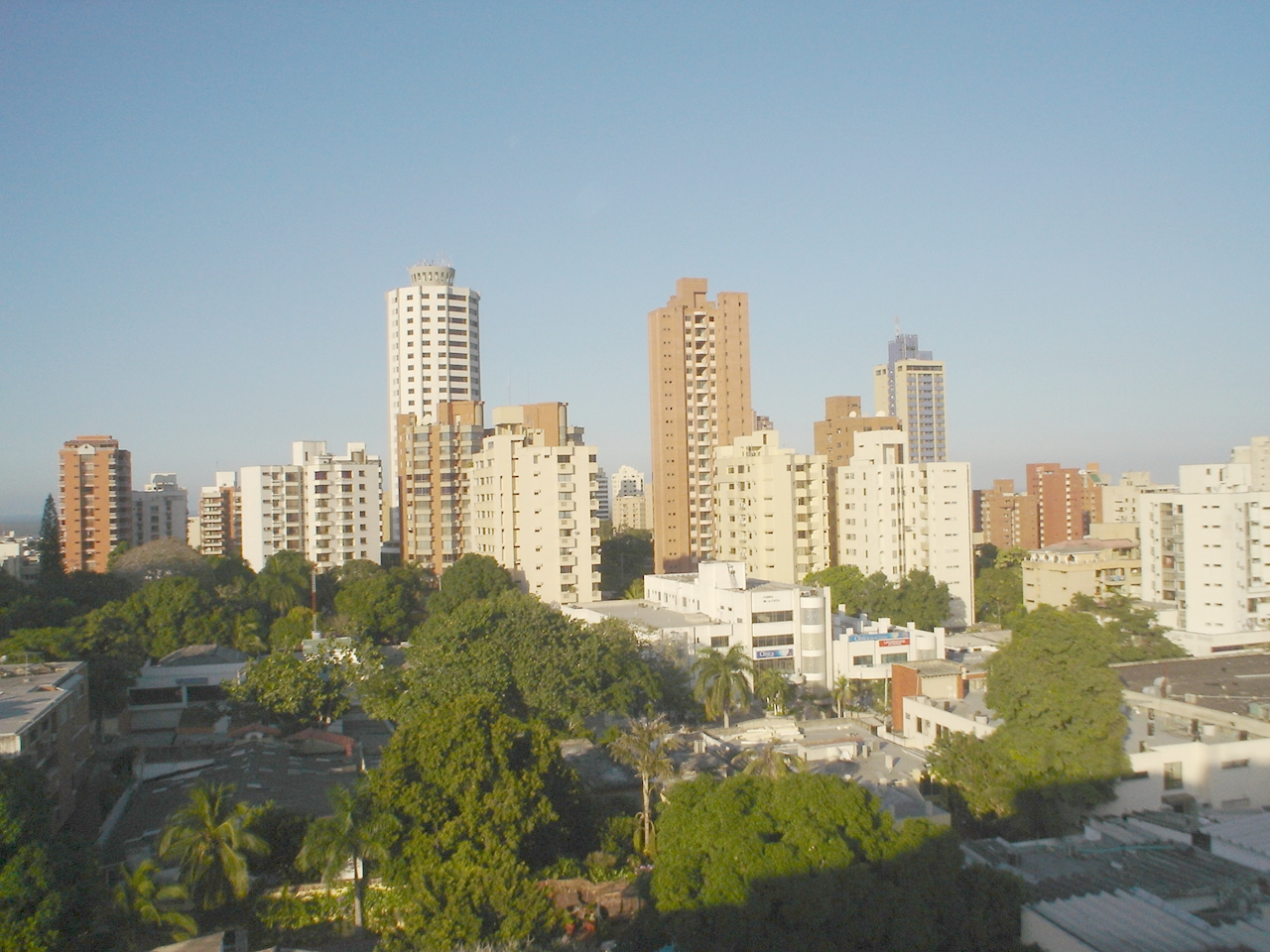
- Torres al norte de Barranquilla.
- GDP: (2006): US $4,605 million COP $10,858,185 million
- GDP per capita: (2006): US $2,209; COP $4,945,029
- Unemployment rate: (2010): 9.2%
- Annual inflation: (2010): 3.38%
- Monthly inflation: (2010): 0.28%
- Country risk: (2009): 38.85 points
- Data retrieved from the Barranquilla Chamber of Commerce – Source: DANE.

To give a boost to the infrastructure development of the city, World Bank (IBRD) loans were sought from 1952 onwards to improve municipal water works, sewage system and slaughterhouse services. Because of its importance in the sector of national economy, the municipality of Barranquilla passed to the category of Special Industrial District and Port in 1993. Barranquilla is a major industrial centre and its economic activity is dynamic, concentrated mainly in industry, commerce, finance, services and fishing. Among the industrial products are vegetable fats and oils, pharmaceuticals, chemicals, industrial footwear, dairy products, meats, beverages, soap, building materials, furniture, plastics, cement, metalworking parts, garments clothing, buses and boats, and petroleum products. Its port is also the hub for cotton from the rural areas, coffee and petroleum, apart from the diversified industrial products manufactured in the city.

The maritime and river ports are engines of the industrial and commercial development of the region. The port of Barranquilla covers two main routes. The Magdalena River connects with the inner country, and the Caribbean Coast, through which millions of tons are traded with the United States, Europe and Asia.

Barranquilla has an international airport, and it is one of the two airports in the country authorized for international cargo. The new Center of Events and Exhibitions of the Caribbean, aims to become the epicenter of business, trade, investment and culture of the Caribbean.

The city's economic activity is dynamic and focuses mainly on industry, commerce, finance, logistics services and fishing. Industrial products include: vegetable fats and oils, pharmaceutical products, industrial chemicals, shoes, dairy products, soft drinks, construction materials, furniture, plastics, cement, clothes, and metal mechanical parts, among others.

The Arabs (Syro Lebanese) and Jews who were a small group of immigrants to the country in the late 19th century were exclusively involved in commercial activities and made significant value additions to the economy of the Caribbean natural region in Colombia as a whole and Barranquilla in particular. Their prominent presence in the community known as "cosmopolitan bourgeoisie" as social and political elites, which has enabled them to diversify their activities.

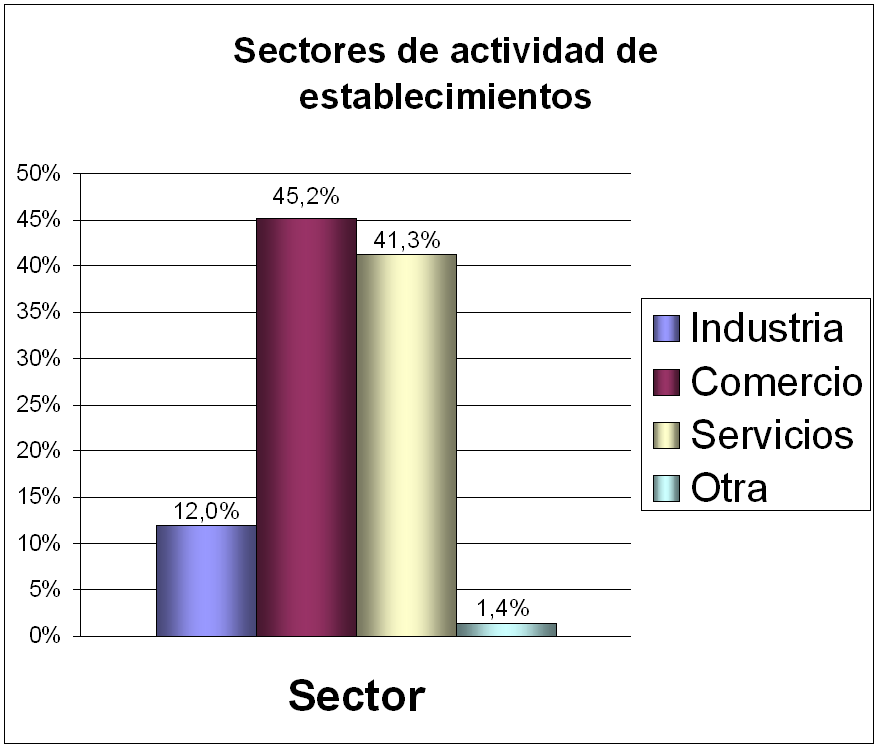
Proportion of occupations

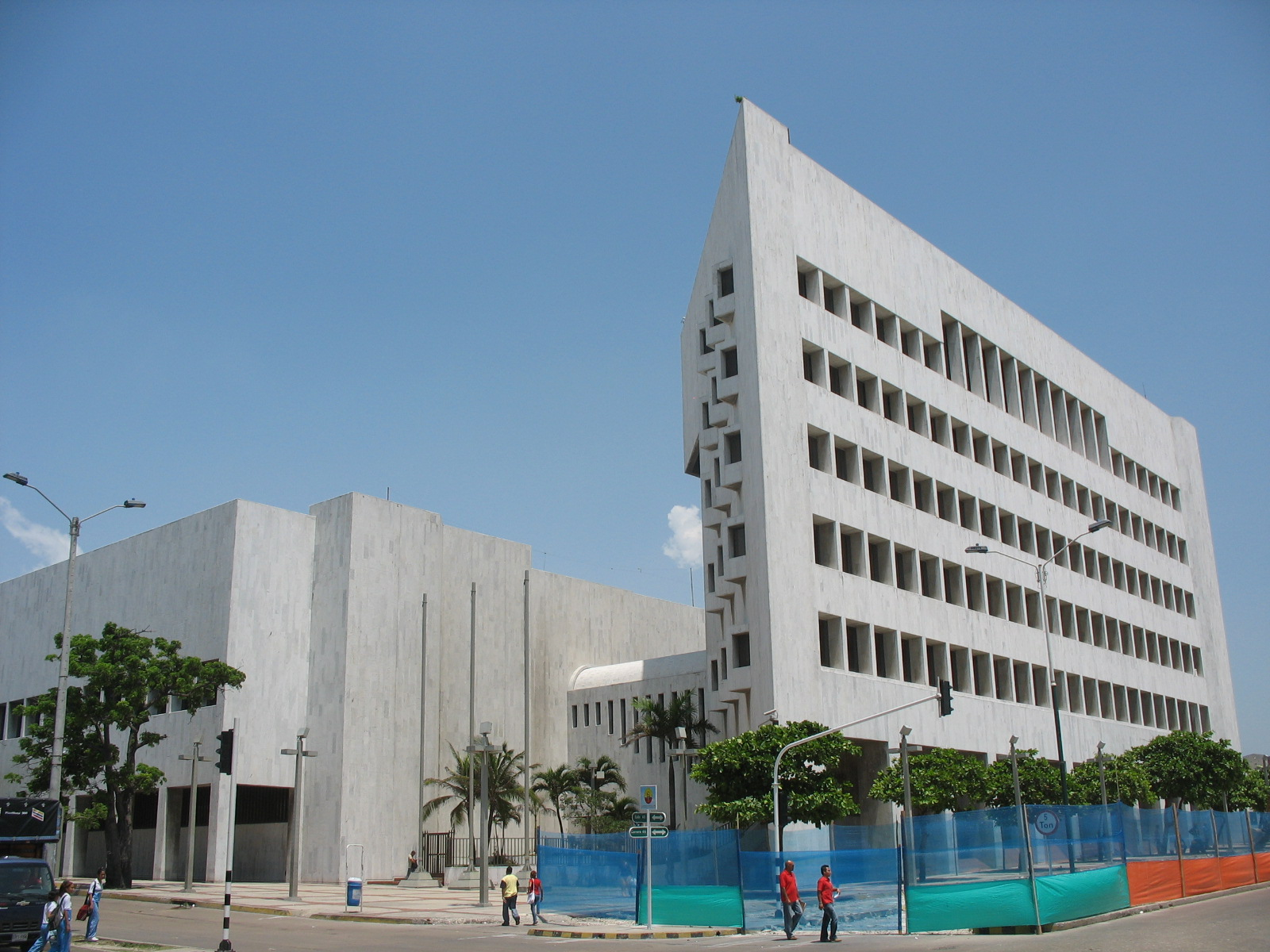
Banco de la República

=== Statistics ===
According to the Integrated Household Survey by DANE, in Barranquilla, during the quarter February to April 2010, the overall participation rate (TGP) was 58.5% occupancy rate (TO) of 53 5%, the underemployment rate subjective (TS Sub), 8.4%, the underemployment rate target (TS Obj) of 6.5% and the unemployment rate (TD) of 5.5%. Also, for the period May 2009 – April 2010, the TGP was 58%, 52.4% OT, ST (U) of 10.6%, CS (Obj) 5.6% and TD of 4.7%. According to the 2005 census, 12.0% of establishments engaged in industry, 65.2% in trade, services 51.3% and 1.4% to another activity. 24.8% of rural homes were occupied in farming. 43.5% of the establishments served between 1 and 10 jobs the month before the census. Most households simultaneously have 2 or 3 types of activities to make a living. The Gran Central de Abastos del Caribe market hall is very important for the collection and distribution of food to the city. The City of Barranquilla is today under a new administration of Mayor Alejandro Char, who made a lot of changes in the whole metropolitan area, with the construction of Trans Millennium, modernizing the city and promoting the industry and commerce taken the city to have the lowest unemployment of the whole nation, Barranquilla has today only 5.6% unemployment, while the nation is over 12%.

=== Economic zones ===
According to the results of the Index of Industrial density by department in four major cities (IDI) 2000–2006 DANE, Barranquilla is fourth with a coefficient of 1.4338 establishments per km ². The primary industrial corridors are the Vía 40, Circunvalar, Calle 30, and Barranquillita. Industrial parks include Metroparque, Industrial del Caribe, Industrial Riomar, Industrial, Comercial y Portuario (PIPCA), Industrial del Norte, Industrial La Trinidad, and the long established Marisol and Almaviva.

The city is divided into different infrastructure zones; the Zona Franca de Barranquilla is the oldest and largest of the country which has around 90 companies operating within it. As of 2007, the construction of three new zones is underway with all international specifications, the first in Galapa, to 11 km (7 mi) and 20 minutes from the port, the second in Barranquillita and third in the neighboring village of Juan Mina, known as the La Cayena.

The sea and river terminals are the engines of industrial and commercial development of the Caribbean Region. The port of Barranquilla covers two main routes, the Magdalena River, which communicates with the interior of the country and the Caribbean Sea, from which millions of tonnes of goods are traded Europe and Asia. With the growing expansion and demand for coal, the authorities are considering developing a Deep Water Port of Barranquilla, "Superpuerto", as it is called locally, with an initial investment of $170 million.

== Demographics ==
Population of Barranquilla (1905–2005)
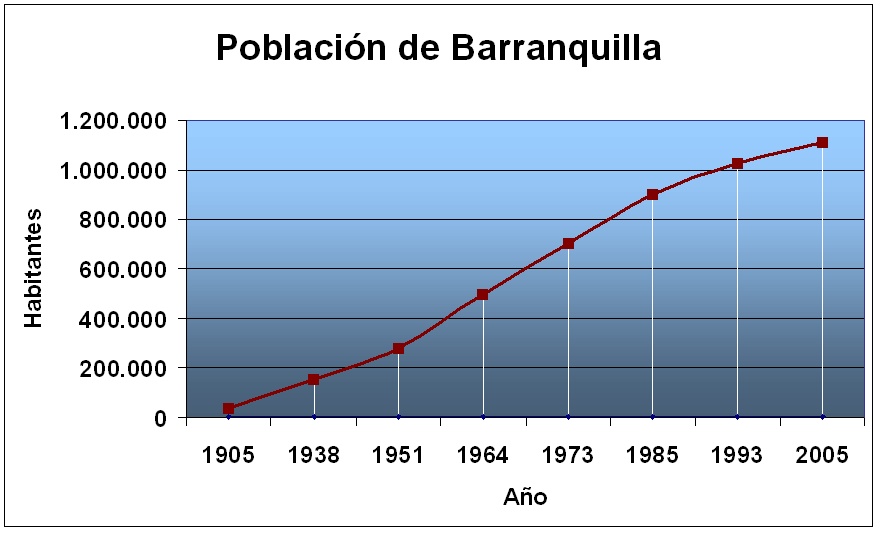
Year	Pop.	±%
1905	38,555	—
1938	150,395	+290.1%
1951	279,627	+85.9%
1964*	498,301	+78.2%
1973*	703,488	+41.2%
1985*	899,781	+27.9%
1993*	1,026,370	+14.1%
2005*	1,112,889	+8.4%
2018*	1,206,319	+8.4%
Source: * Census by DANE

According to the census conducted by DANE in 2005, adjusted to June 30, 2007, the population of Barranquilla is 1,148,506, with 1,821,517 people in its metropolitan area, making it the most populous city of the Colombian Caribbean Coast and the fourth in the nation after Bogotá, Medellín and Cali.

In accordance with Article 102 of Act 142 of 1994, the different neighborhoods of the city are classified according to the 6 socioeconomic categories for residential property in Colombia. The layers 1 and 2 correspond to the sectors in southeast, southwest, northwest and northeast of the city, layers 3 and 4 to the south-central, the central and northern part, and layers 5 and 6 to the north.

Approximately 1,144,470 people live in urban areas and 4,036 in rural areas. The population density is 6918.71 inhabitants per square kilometre. 47.5% of the population is male and the remaining 52.5% female. Approximately 57.9% of households have 4 or fewer people. 26.7% of the population of the city was born in another municipality and 0.4% in another country. 5.3% of the population of Barranquilla has a permanent limitation.

According to the 2005 census, 61.5% of people living were living in a home, 32.4% in apartments and 6.2% in another housing solution. Among the causes of change of residence, 63.3% of the population of Barranquilla who changed residence in the last five years did so for family reasons. 9.2% for difficulty in finding a job, 13.3% for other reasons and 2% to avoid life-threatening situations.

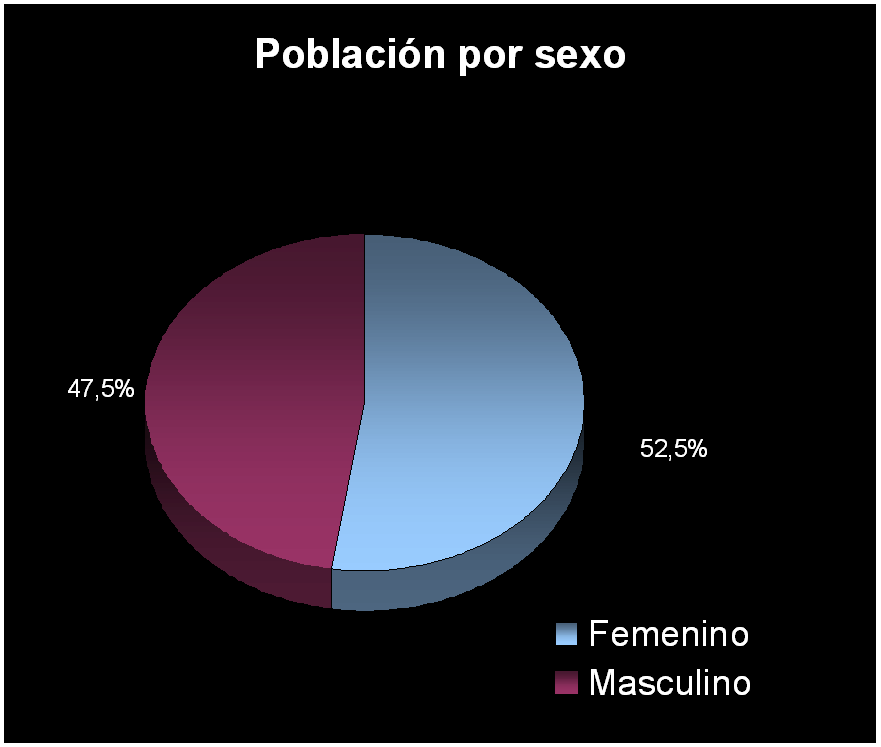
Gender proportion

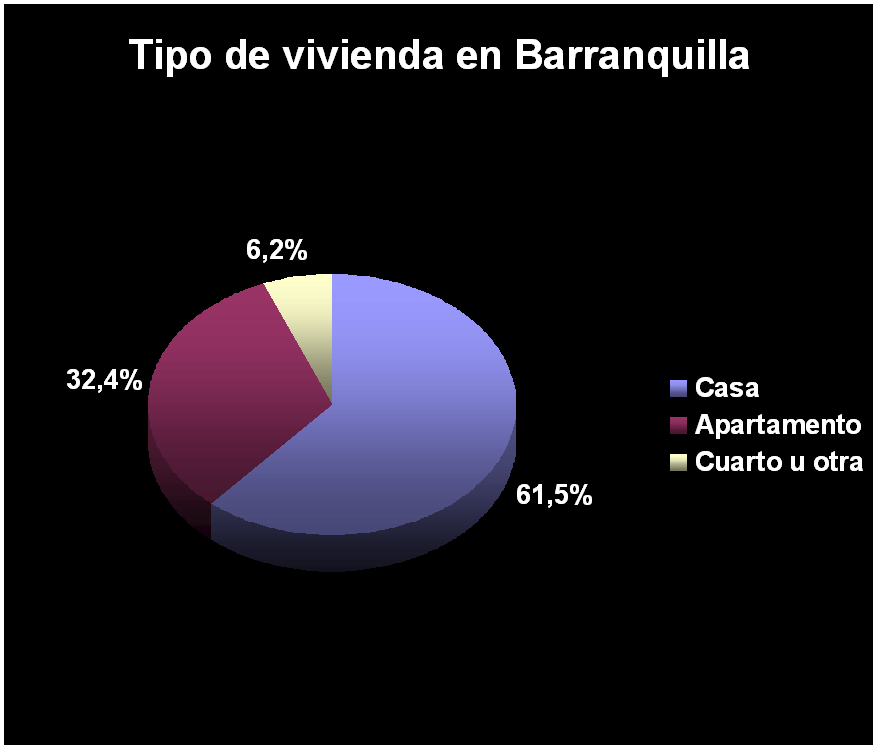
Type of housing

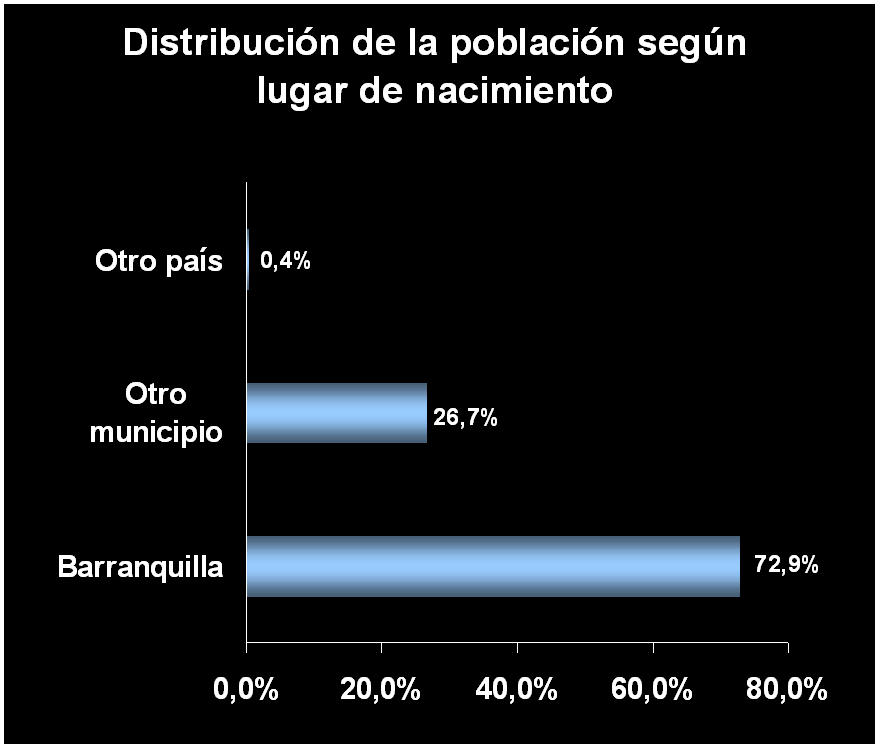
Population by place of birth

=== Birth and death ===
In 2007 there were 29,900 births in Barranquilla, which was a sharp decrease compared to 32,108 in 2006. Deaths in 2007 were 4,310 in the city, which shows a decrease compared to 5,938 in 2006. Barranquilla men have a life expectancy at birth of 72.07 years and women 77.71 years, much like the national average (74.0).

The infant mortality rate of 17.7 for every thousand children born is well below the national average (26). The government aims to lower it to 15, and in children under five years from 20.7 to 18.

=== Crime and security ===
In Barranquilla, in 2007 there were 348 homicides compared to 391 in 2006, a decrease of 11% over the previous year. In Colombia, in 2007 the homicide rate per 100,000 population from Barranquilla (22) is only exceeded by those of Cali (57), Bucaramanga (32) and Medellín (30). In the past 6 years (2002–2007), however, the number of homicides has been declining, the lowest in 2007 with a peak of 483 killings in 2003. Thuggery (42.24%), fights (31.61%) and robbery (14.94%) are the main types of homicide in the city. Historically, the days when most homicides occur are Saturday and Sunday, but in 2007 there was a uniform distribution (approximately 15%) on all days.

85.23% of homicides are by firearm; Barranquilla and Cali in 2007 recorded the highest percentage of homicides involving firearms in Colombia. Most homicides are concentrated in the centre and south of the city. Another type of crime in Barranquilla also showed a growth trend over the past two years is theft, commercial entities (713 in 2007, 630 in 2006, mainly in the north and centre), residences (528 in 2007, 467 in, 2006 mainly in the north), financial institutions (20 in 2006 21 in 2007 mainly in the north) and people (2,692 in 2007, 2,146 in 2006, mainly in centre, north and south).

The programs developed by the Policía del Atlántico to improve safety are: CAI Mobile Community, Youth Civic Police, DARE and Make Peace. Citizen Support Network is made up of School Safety, Security Fronts, the Road Information Community Networks, the network of informants and collaborators and the Support Network and Communications. Community management has sought to increase police presence on the streets and neighborhoods and has set up the Police Bike Block which consists of 1 officer, 3 NCOs, 8 and 60 auxiliary patrol graduates. The city is operating the emergency telephone system of the National Police, through the toll free number 112. In addition to the National Police, the Fire Department, Civil Defense and Red Cross assist in the maintenance of public safety.

Currently, the city is undergoing a crime wave with violent thefts often resulting in the death of the victims, shootings or general chaos and impunity.

== Cityscape ==
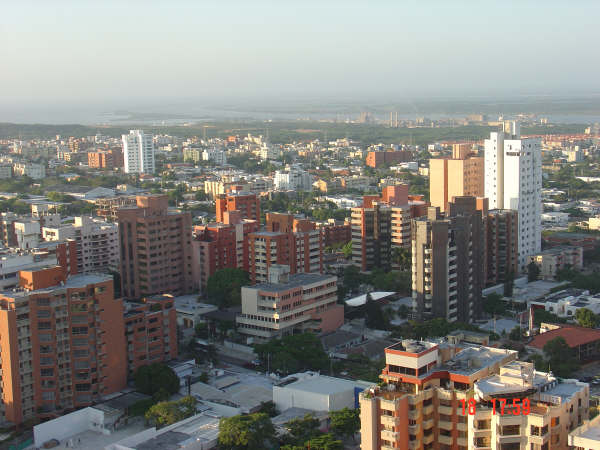
View of Barranquilla's skyline with the Magdalena River flowing into the Caribbean Sea in the background

=== City planning ===
==== Centro histórico ====
The Centro histórico is between Carreras 35 and 46 and Calles 30 and 46, and includes parts of San Roque and Downtown districts. It is part of the town historical centre and North-Central District. In the Centro histórico are the headquarters of the administrative powers of the city and the department. Socio-economically, this was the most important area until the 80's, when the centre's deterioration led to the displacement of formal trade and banking to the north of the city. Despite the decline, the Centre remains at the heart of the city and is the most representative and important sector in economic terms. There is an intense commercial activity at the public market. In addition, the centre hosts a number of buildings of the Republican period and structures of immense historical and architectural value. The Centro histórico of Barranquilla is a nationally protected site by the Ministry of Culture through resolution 1614 of 1999. Since the 90's, the historic center of Barranquilla is in the process of recovery, which was consolidated in 2008 with the Ministry of Culture's announcement for a public competition of urban design. At local government level, the development of Barranquilla centre is sponsored by the Promotora del Desarrollo del Distrito Central de Barranquilla S.A. (Promocentro), a decentralized body attached to the District Municipality.

El paseo de Bolívar

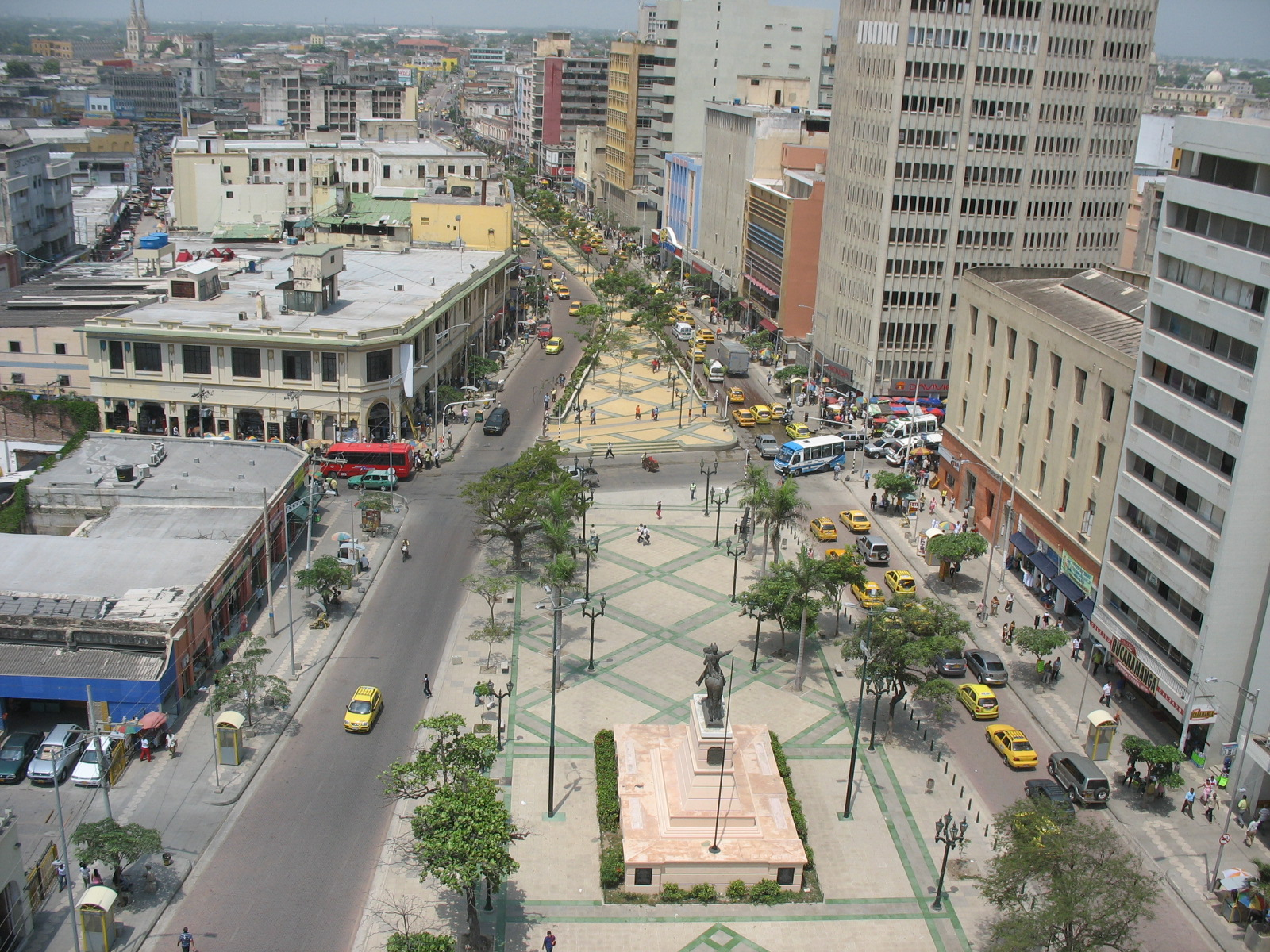
Paseo de Bolívar

The paseo de Bolívar, in the heart of Barranquilla, is the most important avenue of the city and the place from which it expanded. Until the late nineteenth century it was called Calle Ancha (Broad Street), but in 1886 Mayor Antonio Abello renamed it Abello. In the early twentieth century it was located at the north end of Columbus statue, so it was called Paseo de Colón. In 1937, a plaza was built at its northern end with an equestrian statue of the Liberator Simon Bolívar, a gift from Andrés Obregón to the city in 1919, and it was renamed Paseo de Bolívar. It is the linchpin of the historic center, housing many buildings from the Republican period which are in the process of being restored.

==== Public spaces ====
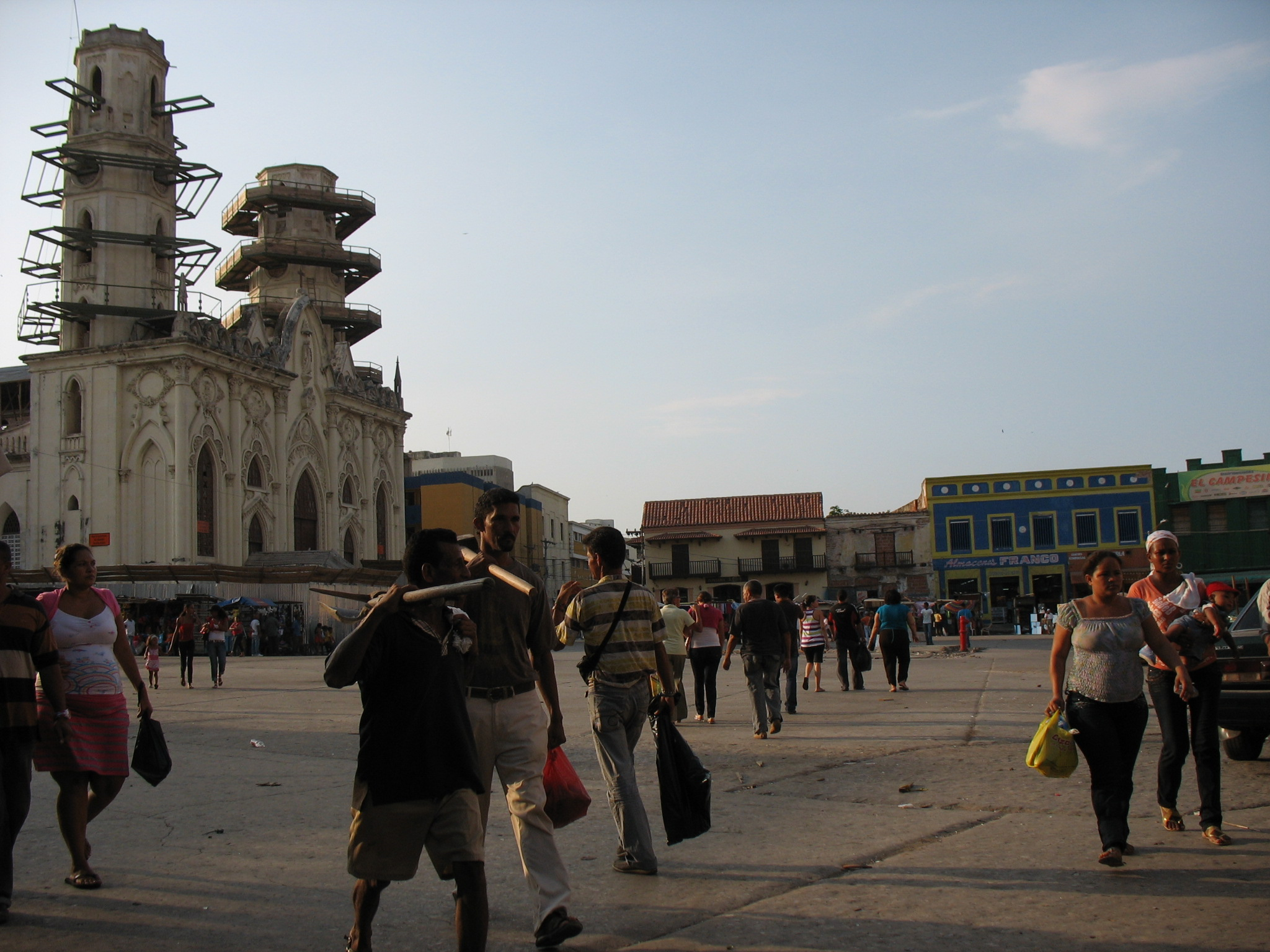
Locals at the Plaza de San Nicolás

Land use, including public space and urban planning, are regulated by the Plan de Ordenamiento Territorial which is prepared by the Mayor through the District Planning Secretariat, and approved or revised by the District Council.Barranquilla has an acute deficiency of public spaces and planting trees, reflected in an average of 0.083 m^{2} (1 sq ft) of squares and green areas per inhabitant. The area of the city that has the highest use of public space is the Centre, where 9069 stationary street vendors exist according to the 2005 census.

Plazas

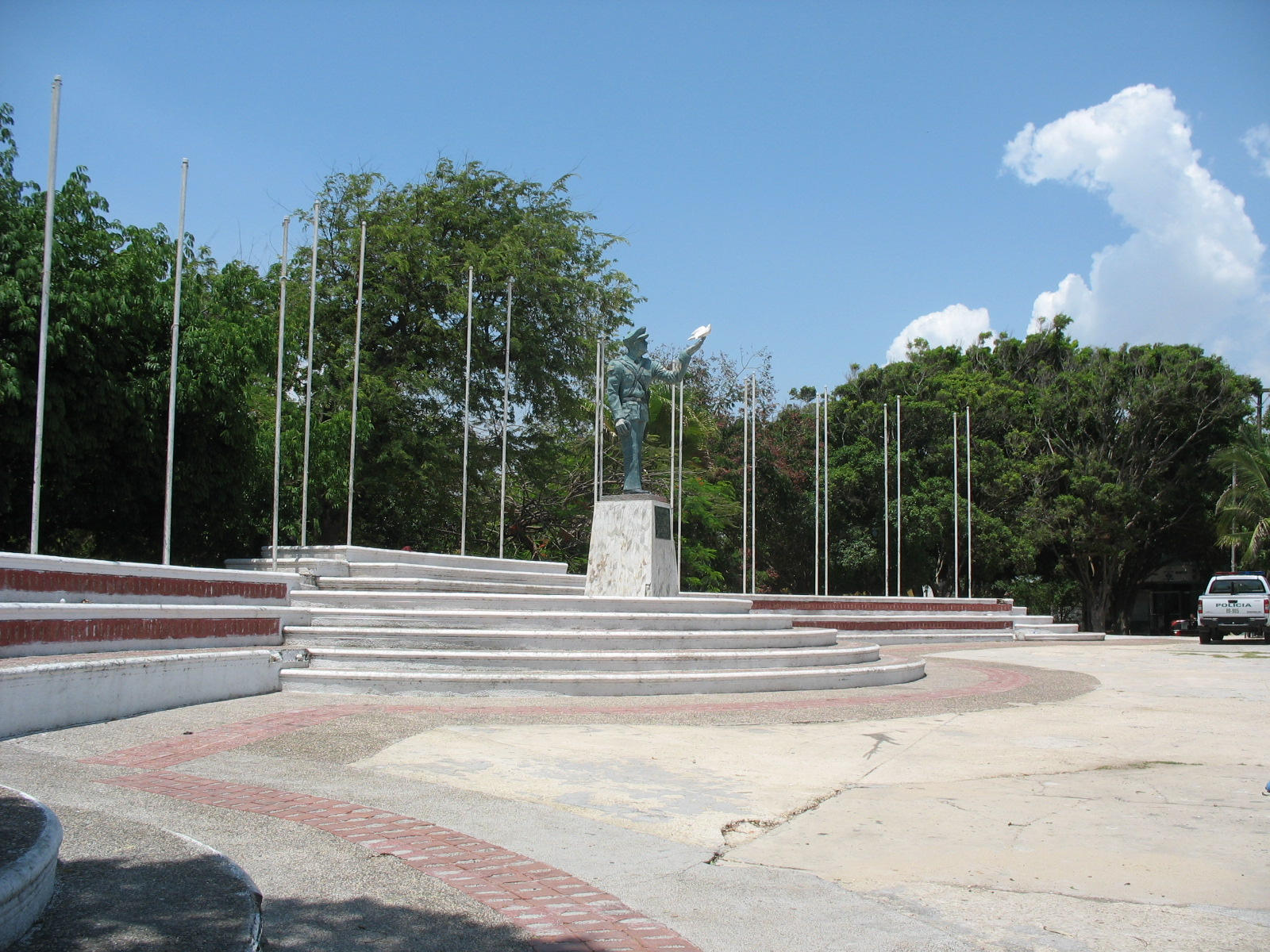
Plaza de la Paz

Among the plazas of the city are Plaza de Bolívar, located at the north end of the promenade of the same name which is the center of the city and the spearhead of restoration of the historic centre, rebuilt in 2003. Plaza de San Nicolás, opposite the church of San Nicolas, was the center of the cultural, commercial and religious Barranquilla in early twentieth century. Plaza de la Paz was built in 1986 opposite the Metropolitan Cathedral to welcome Pope John Paul II. It is an important site of mass social, political and cultural demonstrations. It contains the sculpture "El Policía Amigo".

Plazuela Esthercita Forero is located between Carrera 43 and Calle 74, was built in 2003. It pays tribute to the composer Esthercita Forero, who has a statue and floor plates with the names of his songs. Plaza Mario Santo Domingo is an important public space that is part of the Caribbean Cultural Park and Plaza de la Locomotora, was built in 2002, as part of the Cultural Complex of the former Customs. It exhibits a locomotive of the era where goods were moved by rail between Barranquilla and the alternate port located in the town of Puerto Colombia.

Parks

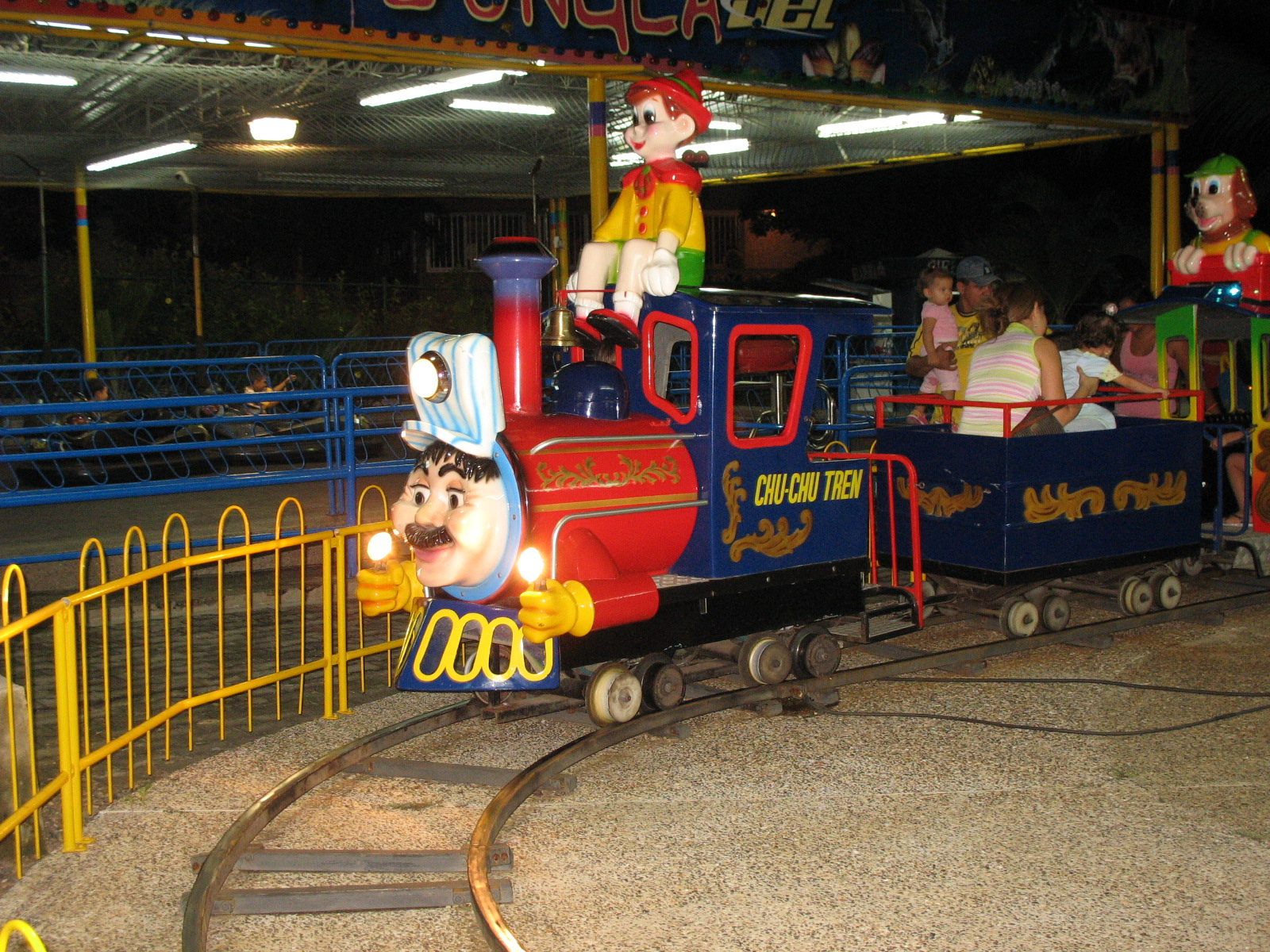
Parque Venezuela

Parque Tomás Surí Salcedo was named in honor of the Minister of Finance, and was built in 1921. Located in the strategic area of Calle 72 and Avenida Olaya Herrera, it offers rides and houses the Elías Chegwin basketball arena. It also hosts the annual Festival del Dulce in time for Easter. Parque Metropolitano, located on the south side of the Roberto Melendez stadium and velodrome in the south of the city also contains a part of the Murillo bridge over the Avenue Circunvalar. It was built for the 2001 Copa América. In 2007 a sculpture of Shakira was added there. Parque Santander, dedicated to the memory of Francisco de Paula Santander, lies in the heart of the traditional neighborhood of El Prado. And Parque de Los Fundadores is located in the ancient neighborhood of El Prado along the central boulevard; it contains several monuments like the eagle in tribute to aviation pioneers who were killed in the crash of 1924.

Monuments

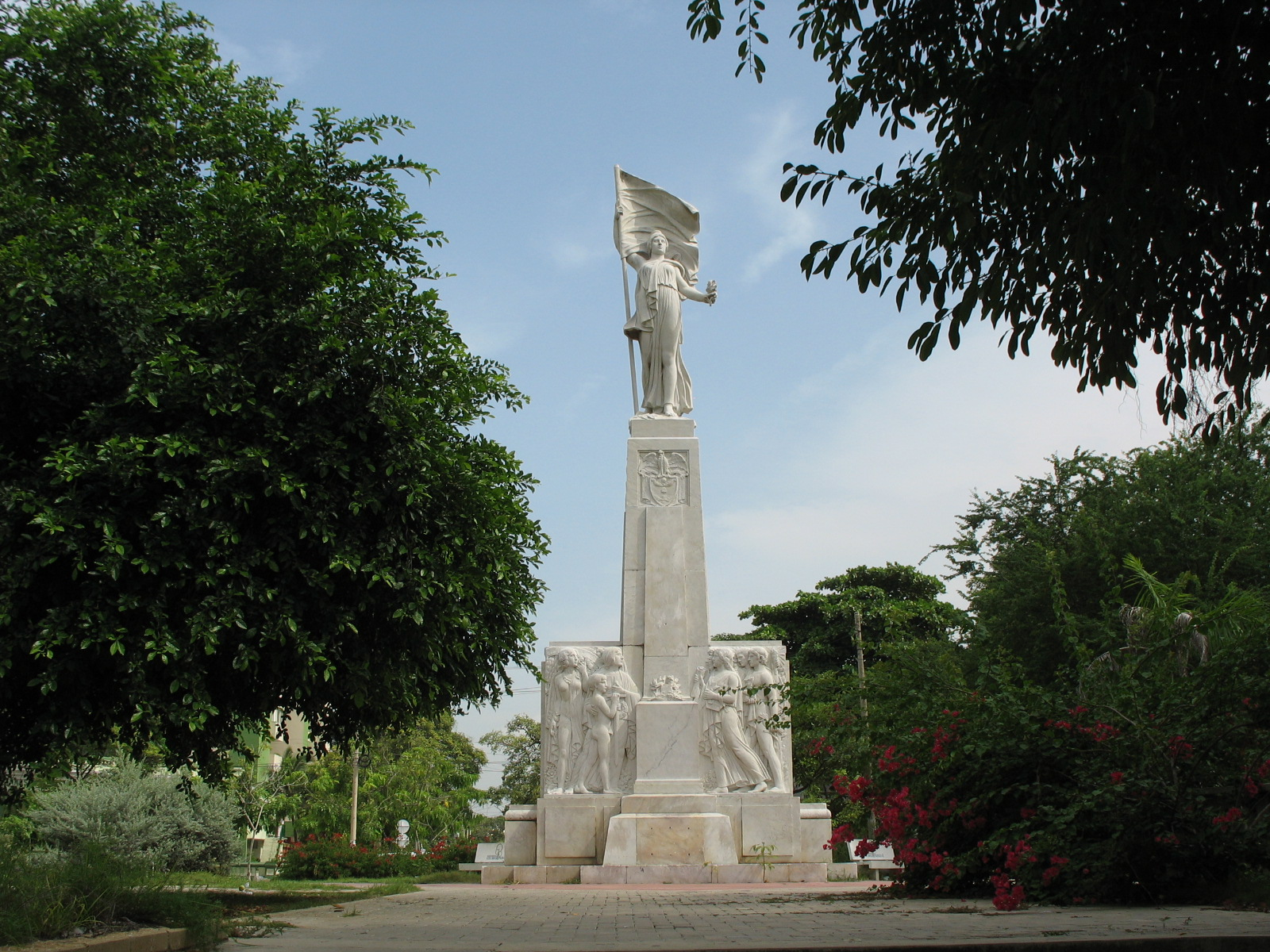
Monument to the Flag

Barranquilla pays tribute to local heroes and national personalities and sister nations, as well as national holidays, sports, art, culture and historical and religious events and religious. Among the most important monuments of the city are the Equestrian statue of Simón Bolívar (1919), in the square of the same name, the center of the city, the Carrara marble statue of Christopher Columbus the Discoverer on the Boulevard de la Carrera 50., which was a gift from the Italian colony in 1892 to mark the fourth centenary of the discovery of America, the Statue of Liberty at Independence Park, a gift from the Syrian colony in 1910 to mark the centenary of the Independence of Colombia, the statue of General Francisco de Paula Santander (1922) in the park of the same name and the Monumento a la Bandera (1932).

In 2007, three historic cannons that were used in the cause of independence were restored: the famous Cañón Verde, Boliche and Rebolo The first two were located in the corners of the south side of the Plaza de Bolívar and the last in the first floor of City Hall.

Road Naming

Barranquilla has a complete road layout, where the roads are twisted in a perpendicular way forming blocks. Using an alphanumeric nomenclature replaced the vernacular names. Streets were named to those that progress from east to west and starting at the Maritime Terminal and those moving from south to north, from Avenue Circunvalar, in the field of the Metropolitan Stadium.

If the property is situated on a street, an address will begin by Calle (otherwise by Carrera), followed by the number of the street and then separated by the # symbol and then usually the name/number of the closest cross street. For example, Calle 47B # 21–10; Carrera 5 Sur # 50–04.

=== Architecture ===
Barranquilla's architecture was built almost entirely in the twentieth century. In the city there are buildings of the colonial period in the early decades of the independent nation, but the profusion of styles that flourished from the late nineteenth century give the city a cosmopolitan atmosphere. This architectural splendor is testament to the influence of the people arriving in the port for much of the nineteenth and twentieth centuries from North America, Europe, the Middle East and Asia, many of whom settled in Barranquilla and imported architectural styles.

Among the most important styles are neoclassical and art deco and interesting examples of neo-colonial architecture, modern, contemporary, eclectic, Mudejar, Spanish late Baroque, Mozarabic and Netherlands Antilles style Caribbean architecture. Some modern buildings are influenced by international architects such as Oscar Niemeyer, Le Corbusier (who was in Barranquilla at the end of the 1940s), Leopoldo Rother, Mies van der Rohe and Richard Neutra, among others that have contributed to an impressive architectural landscape.

Republican architecture

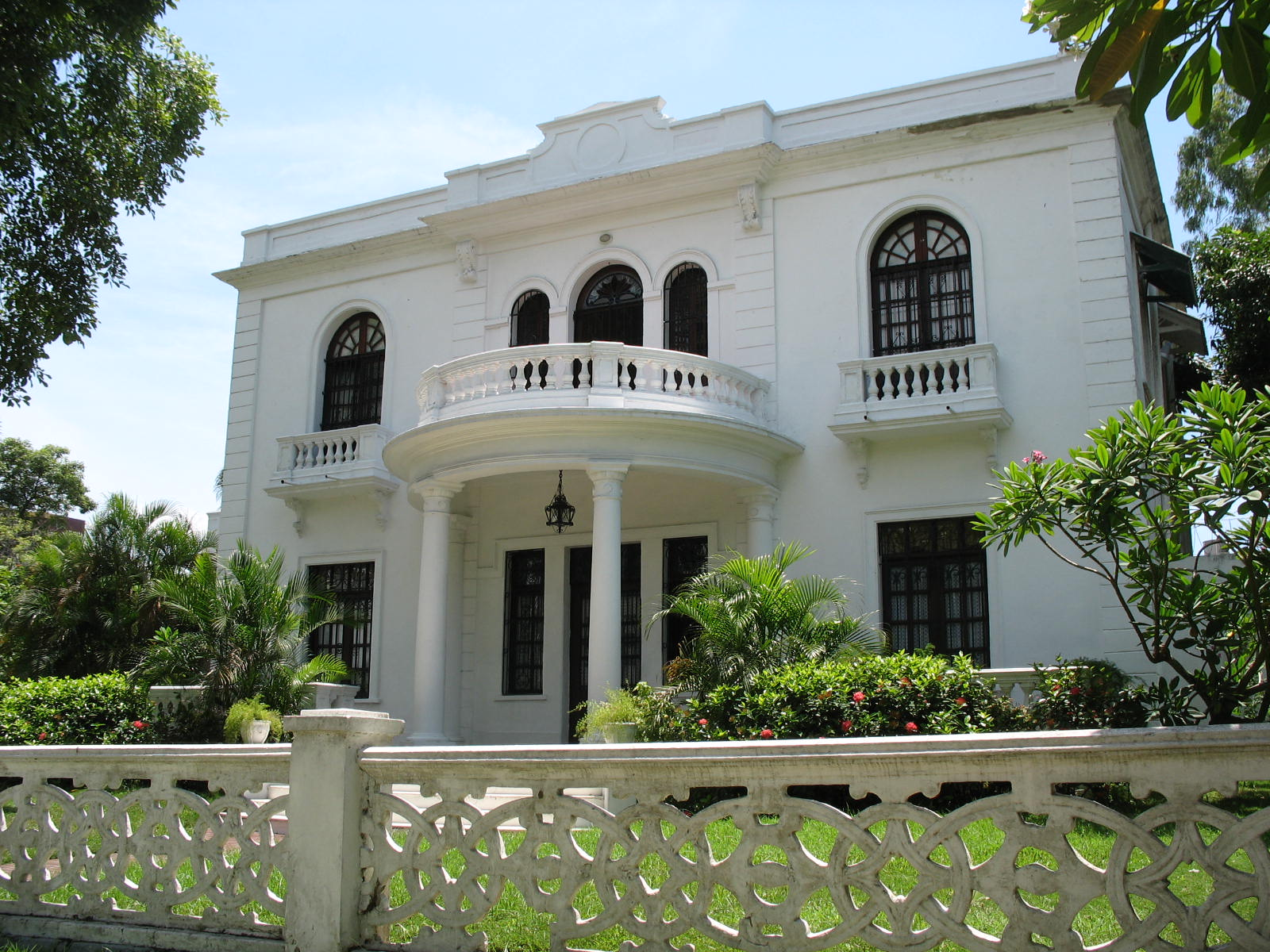
Casona Republicana, an example of neo-classical architecture in the barrio of El Prado.

The so-called "Republican architecture" "style" refers to the architecture of the period in Colombia after independence in 1819, wand around 1930, which brings together different styles in the city, including the late baroque and neoclassical Spanish.

Since the beginning of the twentieth century neoclassical buildings were especially welcome in Barranquilla. Among the outstanding examples are Instituto La Salle, Villa Heraldo, la Corporación Autónoma Regional del Atlántico (former home of writer Álvaro Cepeda Samudio), the residence of Ezequiel Rosado, Funeraria Jardines del Recuerdo, the restored Customs building, the former Banco Comercial de Barranquilla and Banco Dugand y La Perla, among many others, mainly in the neighborhood of El Prado and in the Centro Histórico de Barranquilla. Other noteworthy buildings are the Hotel El Prado (Spanish late Baroque), the Faculty of Fine Arts at the Universidad del Atlántico and the Intendencia Fluvial.

The transition (1930–1945)

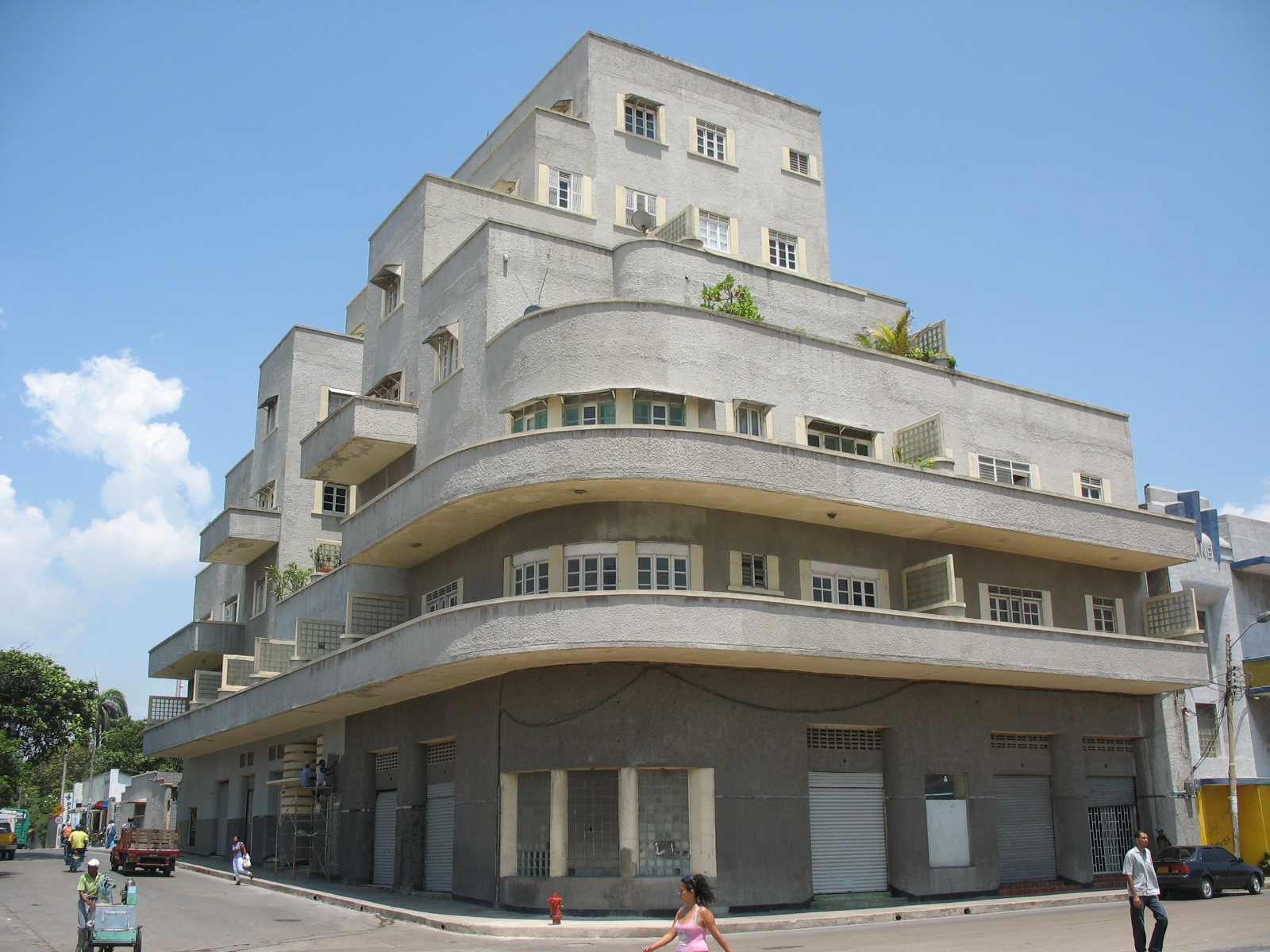
Edificio García (1938), Art déco.

Colombian architectural movement prior to the Modern Movement looks notably different from buildings of the Republicans. Most prominent is Art Nouveau and Art Deco. In the city there are many buildings with Art Deco style, typical of the 1930s, as the Estadio Romelio Martínez (1935), the Departmental Library of Barranquilla (1945), the Rex Theatre (1935), the late Metro Theatre (1946, former Apollo) Shaare Sedek Synagogue (1946–1947), the building of the Agricultural Exhibition (1936, later became Industrial School), the Eckardt building (1939 ), the former residence of the Cuban architect Manuel Carrerá in the Bellavista neighborhood, the García building (1938), Teatro Colón (1946), the former building of Avianca (1934), the last four designed by Manuel Carrerá. The Estadio Romelio Martínez stadium was recognized in 1995 as a national monument by the Ministry of Culture, the first Art Deco building in Barranquilla to obtain this declaration.

Modern movement (1945–1970)

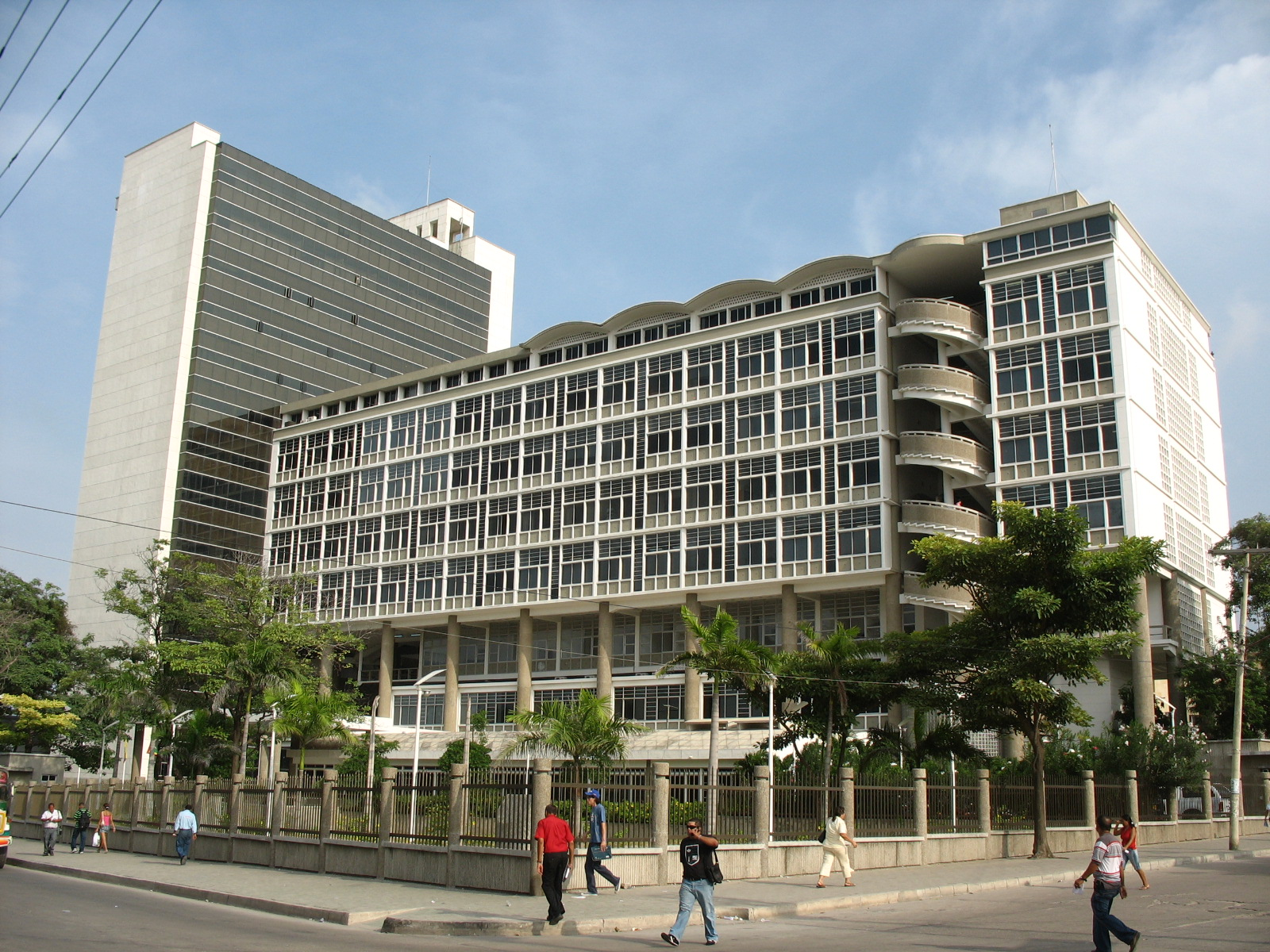
Edificio Nacional (1945) and Rodrigo Lara Bonilla (most recent).

The Modern Architecture is characterized by being free of ornamental designs that identify the buildings of the Republican period, and the trend toward architectural rationalism in concrete. Among the most valuable examples of modern architecture in the city include the National Building (1945), seat of the judicial branch, designed by German architect Leopoldo Rother, Queen Mary's Cathedral (begun in 1955) and the old building of the Agricultural Credit Bank (1964), located on the top of Paseo de Bolívar and designed by architect Fernando Martínez Sanabria. Also, worth mentioning is the Sena buildings, the elegant building of Telecom (with a sculpture by Alejandro Obregón in the square of access), the buildings of the Universidad del Atlantico and the Mayor building in the Paseo de Bolívar, a former building of the Bank of the Republic.

(1970–1985)

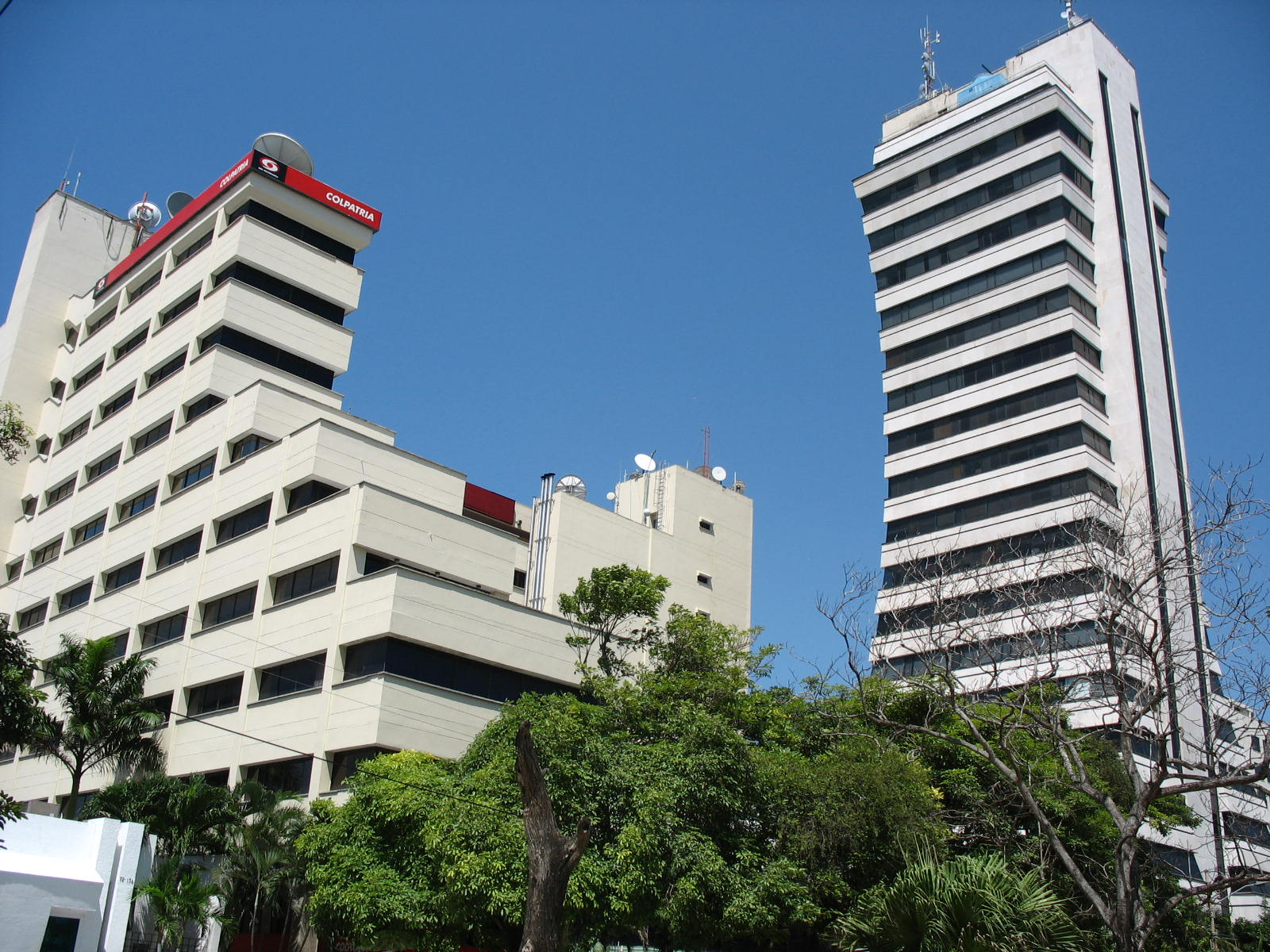
Executive Centre I in the north of Barranquilla.

This is a period in which the system Unidad de Poder Adquisitivo Constante (UPAC) resulted in the commercialization of architecture at the expense of spatial quality and aesthetics. The search for safer environments brought about the proliferation of housing complexes and shopping centres closed. The Postmodern Movement appears briefly trying to enhance the historical styles left behind by the modern movement. During this recovery period, buildings of important architectural heritage were recognized and protected such as the Centro Histórico. Among the most representative buildings of this period include the Executive Centre I, the Girasol building, the towers of the Banco Popular, Bogotá and Bancolombia, and the Rodrigo Lara Bonilla building.

Contemporary architecture

Of note are recent buildings such as the World Trade Center of Barranquilla and many apartment towers north of the city and headquarters of Metrotel and Prado Office Center, neoclassical, to be consistent with the architecture of the neighborhood of El Prado, where they are located.

Religious buildings

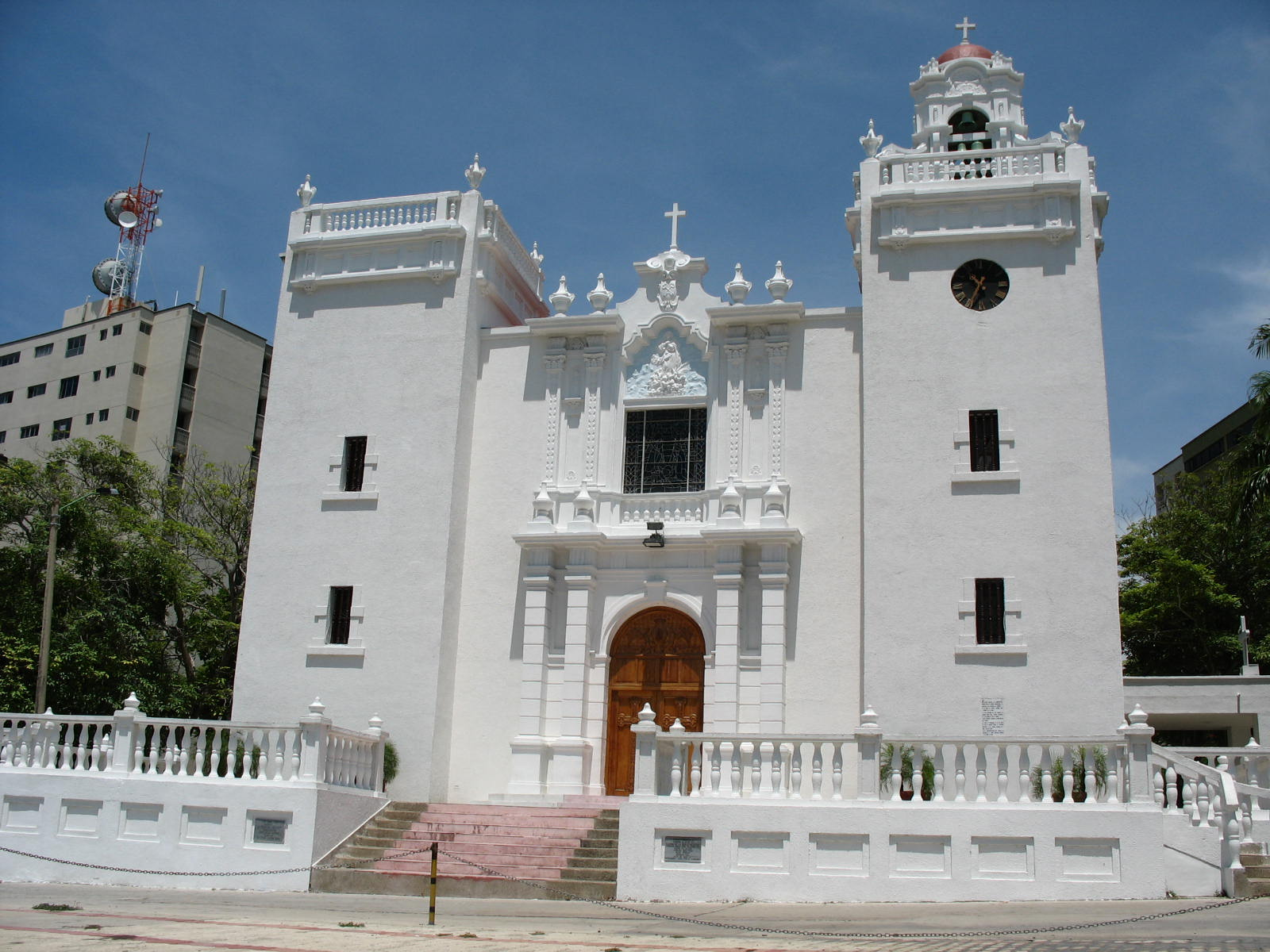
Inmaculada Concepción Church

The city has a large number of places of worship, exhibiting a rich variety of architectural styles, from neo-Gothic to Baroque and Neo-Mudéjar, contributing to the city's architectural charm. Some of the prominent religious buildings include:

- María Reina Metropolitan Cathedral, known for its stunning stained glass windows. This cathedral showcases neo-Gothic architecture and is located in the Norte-Centro Histórico locality.
- San Nicolás de Tolentino Church, known for its strong neo-Gothic architecture, this church is dedicated to Saint Nicholas of Tolentino and is located in the Norte-Centro Histórico locality.
- San Roque Church, dedicated to Saint Roch and known for its tall twin clock towers and historical significance.
- Inmaculada Concepción Church, emblem of Republican architecture in the city and part of the exclusive El Prado neighborhood. The church is named after the Immaculate Conception.
- Nuestra Señora del Perpetuo Socorro Church, significant religious and historical landmark in the city, showcasing the architectural styles of the early 20th century. This church is dedicated to Our Mother of Perpetual Succour
- San José Salesian Church, located in the Norte-Centro Histórico locality, known for its architecture and religious significance. Named after Saint Joseph.
- Nuestra Señora del Carmen Church, dedicated to Our Lady of Mount Carmel, located in the Norte-Centro Histórico locality.
- Sagrado Corazón de Jesús Church, dedicated to the Sacred Heart of Jesus, located in the Norte-Centro Histórico locality.
- Nuestra Señora del Rosario Church, dedicated to Our Lady of the Rosary, located in the Norte-Centro Histórico locality.
- Nuestra Señora de Chiquinquirá Church, dedicated to Our Lady of the Rosary of Chiquinquirá, located in the Norte-Centro Histórico locality.
- Nuestra Señora de las Gracias de Torcoroma Parish, dedicated to Our Lady of Graces of Torcoroma, located in the Norte-Centro Histórico locality.
- San Francisco de Asís Church, dedicated to Saint Francis of Assisi, located in the central area of the city.
- Sagrada Familia Church, dedicated to the Holy Family, located in the Norte-Centro Histórico locality.
- Central Baptist Church
- Liceo de Cervantes Chapel, located in the Liceo de Cervantes School, known for its stained glass windows.
- Nuestra Señora de la Caridad del Cobre Church, dedicated to Our Lady of Charity, located in the Norte-Centro Histórico locality.
- Shaare Sedek Synagogue, located in the Norte-Centro Histórico locality.
- Othman Ben Affan Mosque, located in the Riomar locality.

=== Tourist landmarks ===
Barranquilla has developed throughout the years an active business and commercial tourist centre especially during times of carnivals and New Year's Eve, when it receives a large influx of visitors.

The northern sector of the city is the most modern and best equipped in terms of infrastructure, with the best neighborhoods, parks, hotels, and shopping centers. It is also the axis of cultural and business life of Barranquilla. It is the location of promising new developments in infrastructure and urban architectural projects of great importance in the city. In terms of hotels, the city has an adequate infrastructure. One can find everything from residences to inns and 5 star national and international hotel chains. The best hotels are located in the north of the city, near important business districts and shopping centres, which are also often used for holding events, conventions, conferences, among others.

Barranquilla offers locals and visitors a variety of venues and shopping malls where domestic and imported goods can be purchased. The main business sectors are the centre and north of the city. Calle 98 is an exclusive area located north of Barranquilla, the axis of the expansion of the city with new shopping centres, sports complexes and residential complexes. Calle 84 is located north of the city and became fashionable as a place of celebration during qualifying for the 1990 FIFA World Cup. It was called the "Calle de la Rumba". Calle Murillo is a large area that starts in the central and southern ends of town, near the Estadio Roberto Meléndez. Carrera 53 lies in the exclusive neighborhood of El Country and Alto Prado, centered on Washington Park, where there are fine restaurants, bars and nightclubs.

Among the main tourist sites include:

Bocas de Ceniza and the Magdalena River

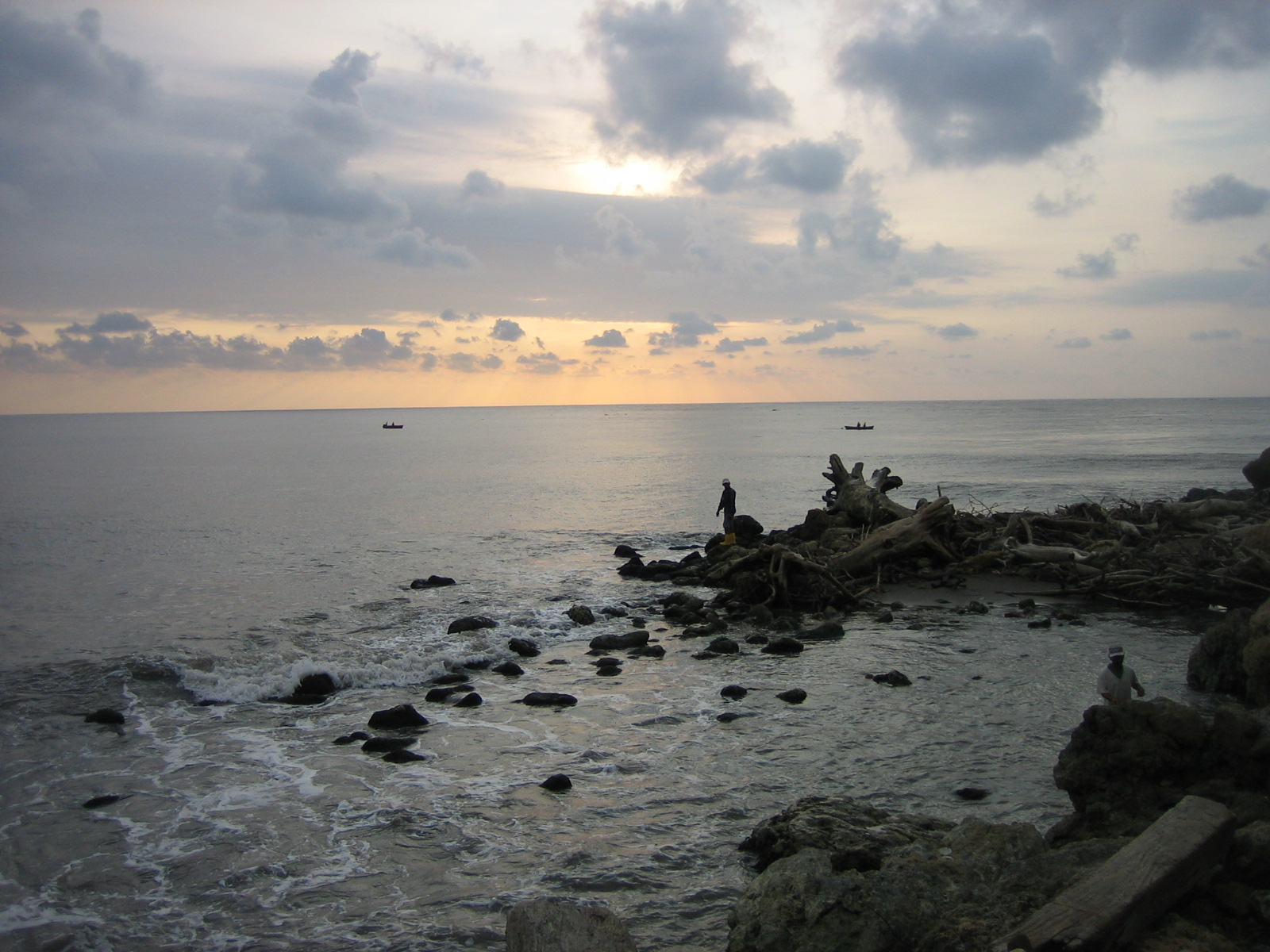
Bocas de Ceniza.

Bocas de Ceniza is the mouth of the Magdalena River in the Caribbean Sea. Its importance lies in accessing the port of Barranquilla. Occasionally trips are organized on river barges that depart from Las Flores to Bocas de Ceniza. There are also special excursions made by small boats along the river, enjoying the local restaurants and touring the nearby swamps.

The Port of Puerto Colombia

Built in 1893 by the Barranquilla Railway & Pier Company under the direction of Cuban engineer Francisco Javier Cisneros, the pier in the neighboring municipality of Puerto Colombia was once one of the longest in the world. Thousands of immigrants came into the country in the late nineteenth and early twentieth centuries at this port. In 2008 it was partially closed due to its progressive degradation. On March 7, 2009, it suffered the collapse of the final 200 meters of its structure because of strong winds, forcing its complete closure and evacuation of the inhabitants of the area. Despite having been declared a National Monument in 1998, no restoration work has ever been done. Because of the latest tragedy, the local government is developing a strategy to rebuild it.

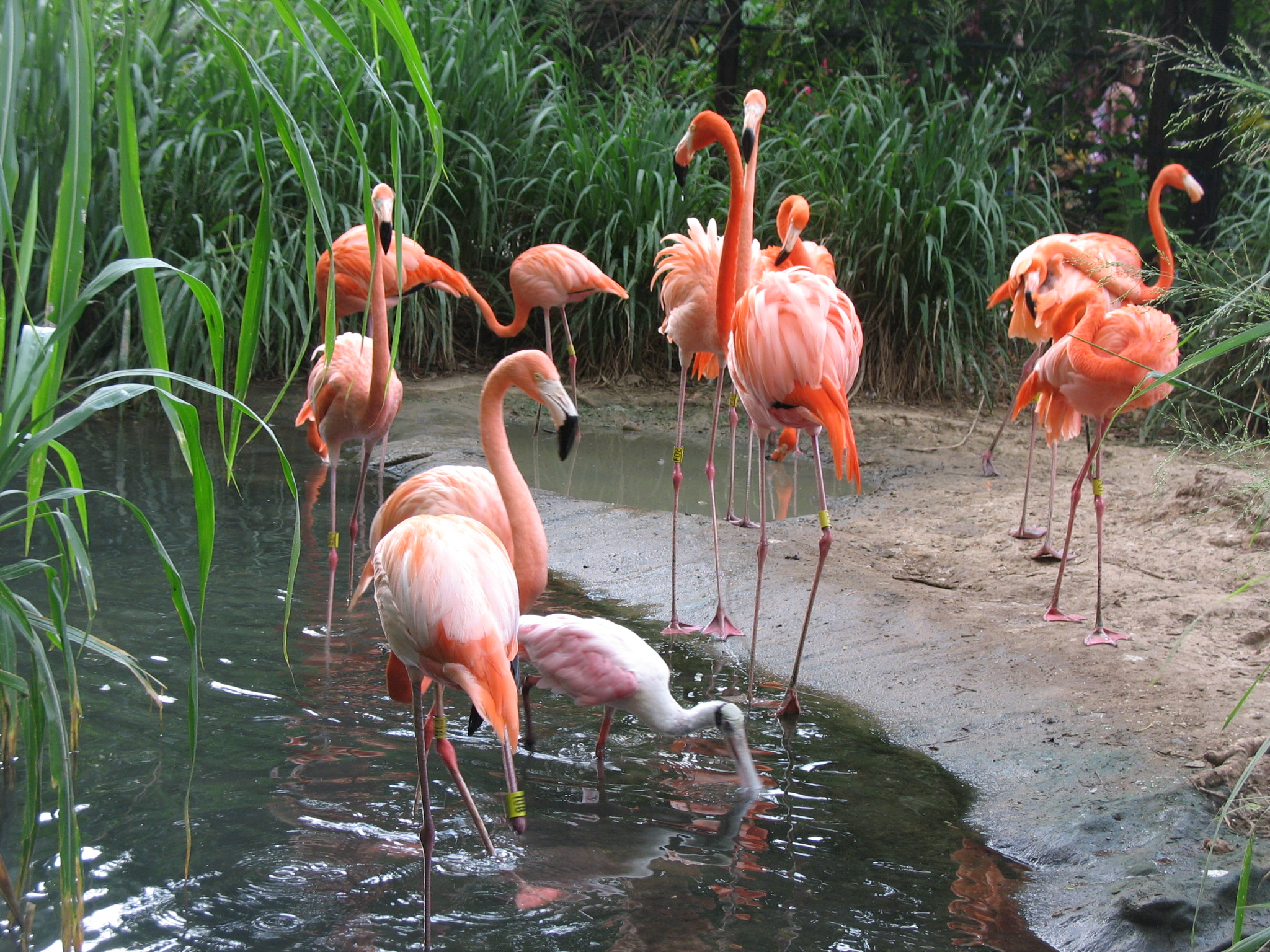
Flamingos at the zoo

Barranquilla Zoo

Barranquilla Zoo is a wildlife sanctuary which houses colorful native and foreign animal species, with an emphasis on Colombian fauna and the protection of endangered species. It has over 500 animals of 140 species, from chickens to elephants or lions, to many different mammals, fish, birds, reptiles, amphibians and primates.

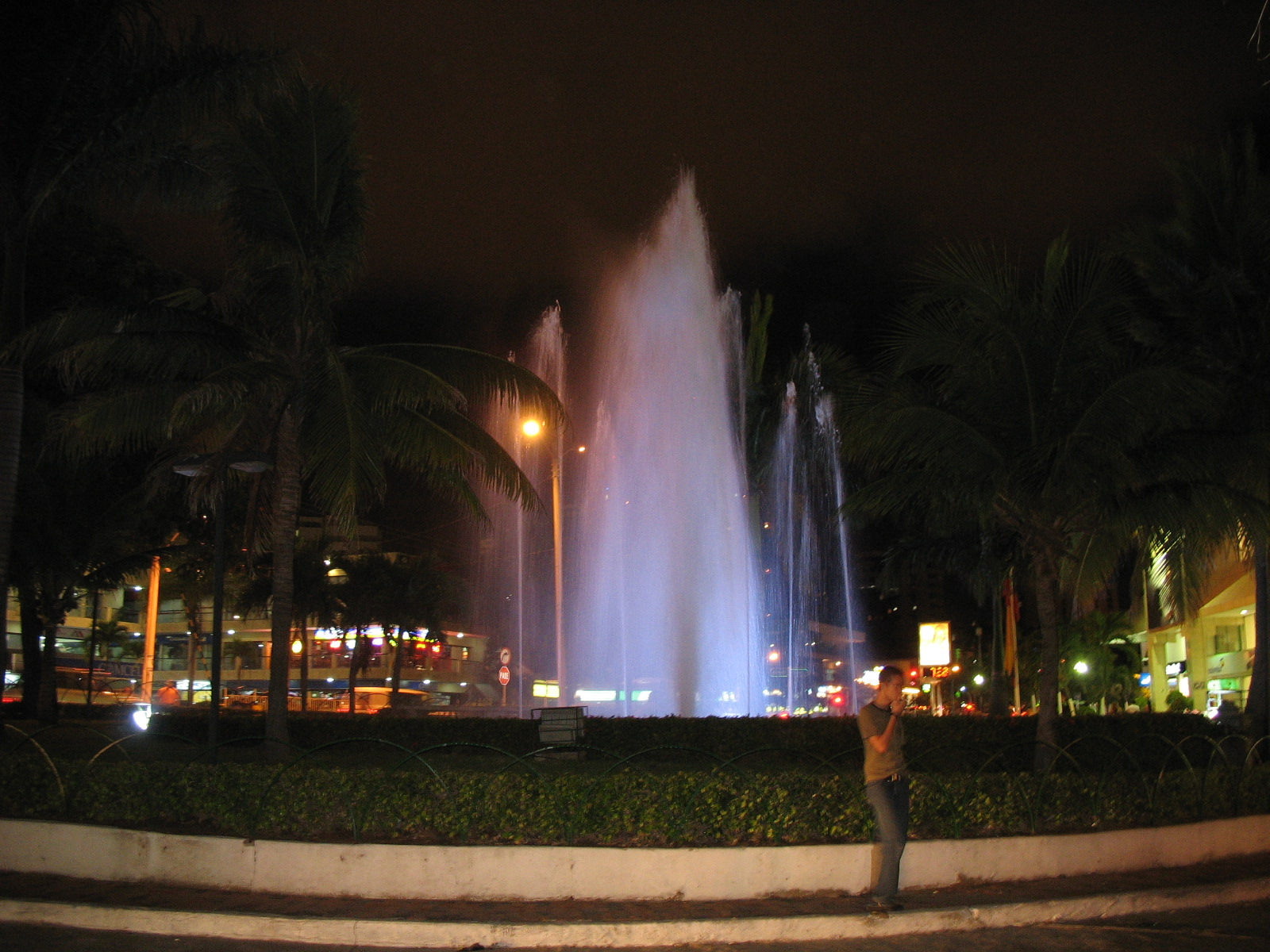
Villa Country.

=== Around Barranquilla ===
A maximum one hour by road are several tourist attractions in the surrounding area. Northwest of the department, bordering the Caribbean Sea, there are a number of resorts like Pradomar, Salgar, Sabanilla, Puerto Colombia, Santa Verónica, Caño Dulce, Playa Mendoza, Puerto Velero, Puerto Mocho, Cisne Lake, where visitors can enjoy a variety of water sports, camping, fishing and excursions. Paragliding is offered at the Cupino hill in the municipality of Puerto Colombia. In Usiacurí tourists can visit the house of the poet Julio Flórez and buy handicrafts. In the municipalities of Luruaco and Repelón people can practice water sports and other recreational activities. In other areas of the Atlántico department are livestock fairs, cultural festivals, gastronomic, folkloric and musical events.

=== Cultural landmarks ===
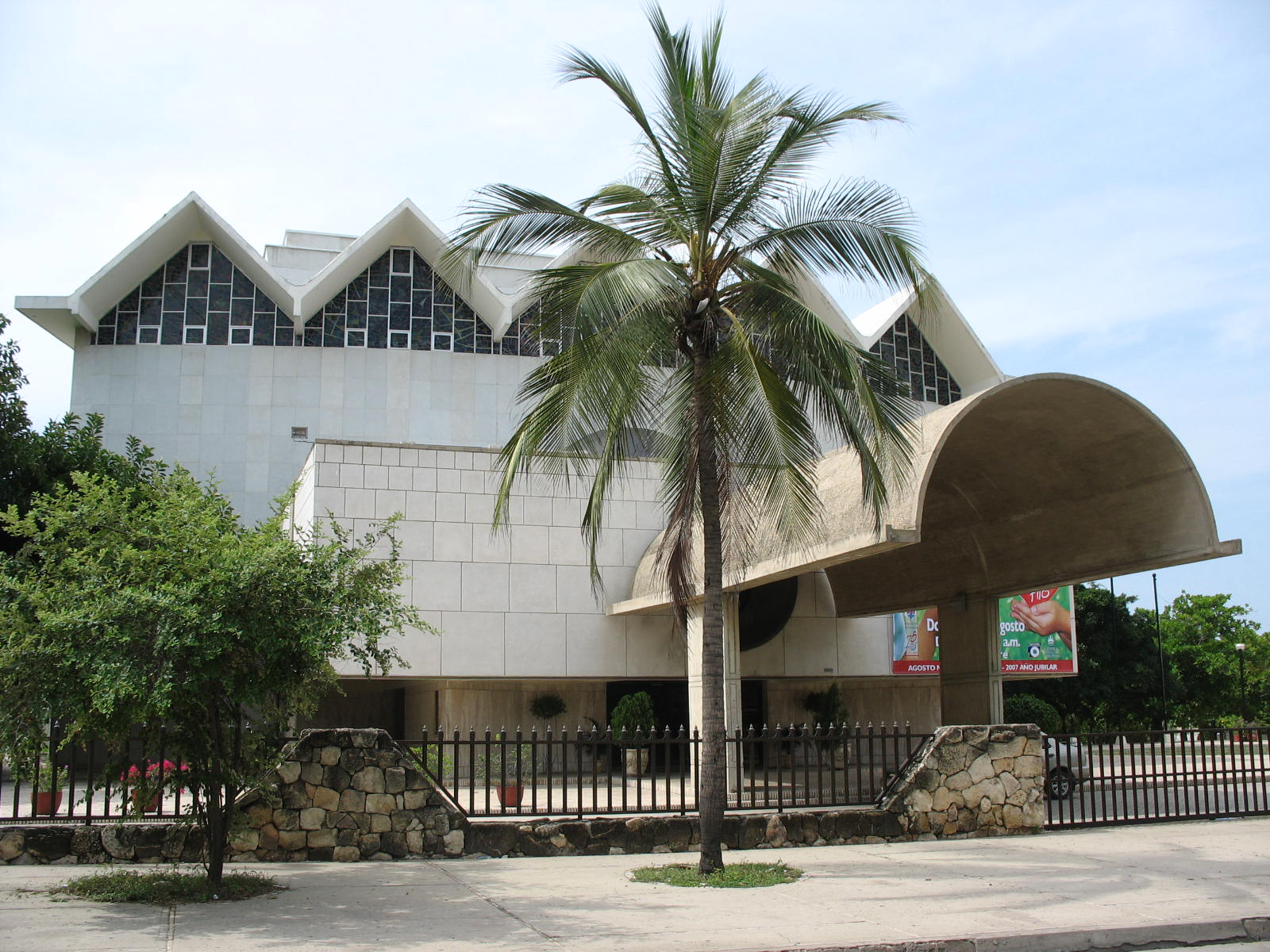
Teatro Amira de la Rosa.

==== Teatro Amira de la Rosa ====
Housed in a traditional strategic sector of the city at the confluence of the deep-rooted neighborhoods of El Prado, Montecristo and Abajo, on May 7, 1976, Barranquilla marked a milestone in its musical and social history, with the presentation of Sinfonía Latina, a concert that was held at the Municipal Theater of Barranquilla, known today as the Amira de la Rosa Theater. This theatre, as well as venues such as the Coliseo Humberto Perea and Casa del Carnaval Colosseum has had an important role in cultural diffusion since 1982, with space for gatherings, presentations, meetings, concerts and exhibitions. It is named after playwright, poet, journalist, and writer Amira de la Rosa.

==== Museums ====
Museo Romántico (Romantic Museum) is located in a Republican mansion in El Prado district, showing objects from the history of the city. Costumes can be seen from the Carnival Queens to a replica of the old Abello ridge on the Paseo de Bolívar, through to the typewriter that Gabriel García Márquez wrote his first novel on, La Hojarasca. There are also letters of Simón Bolívar, photographs, albums, collections of newspapers, and other items that identify the history of the city. Museo del Caribe (Museum of the Caribbean) is located in the Parque Cultural del Caribe. Museo Antropológico y Etnológico (Anthropological and Ethnological Museum.) is housed in the Faculty of Fine Arts at the Universidad del Atlántico. It presents a comprehensive collection of pieces from the indigenous cultures that inhabited the region. It also provides services as a newspaper library, reading room and exhibition hall. Museo de Arte Moderno (Museum of Modern Art)., established in 1996, brings together an important selection of works by several of the most important artists of the second half of the twentieth century. The collection includes works by renowned authors such as Fernando Botero, Alejandro Obregón, Enrique Grau and Luis Caballero. It is planned to be transferred to the Parque Cultural del Caribe.

Museo Aeronáutico (Aeronautical Museum) is located at the Naval Officers' School ARC, founded in 1989 in tribute to the momentum that took place in Barranquilla with commercial aviation in the early twentieth century. Museo del Atlántico (Museum of the Atlantic) is a new regional museum located in the former headquarters of the Government of the Atlántico Department, covering over 4,000 square metres. Museo del Carnaval (Carnival Museum) is another new museum established on April 7, 2011, by the Fundación Carnaval de Barranquilla in partnership with the Parque Cultural del Caribe and the Museo del Caribe, located in the Casa del Carnaval in the barrio of Abajo. El Teatro fue cerrado en 2016 por problemas estructurales, en medio de controversias respecto a su urgente renovación y apertura.

==== Emblematic Cultural Sites and Organizations ====
Parque Cultural del Caribe

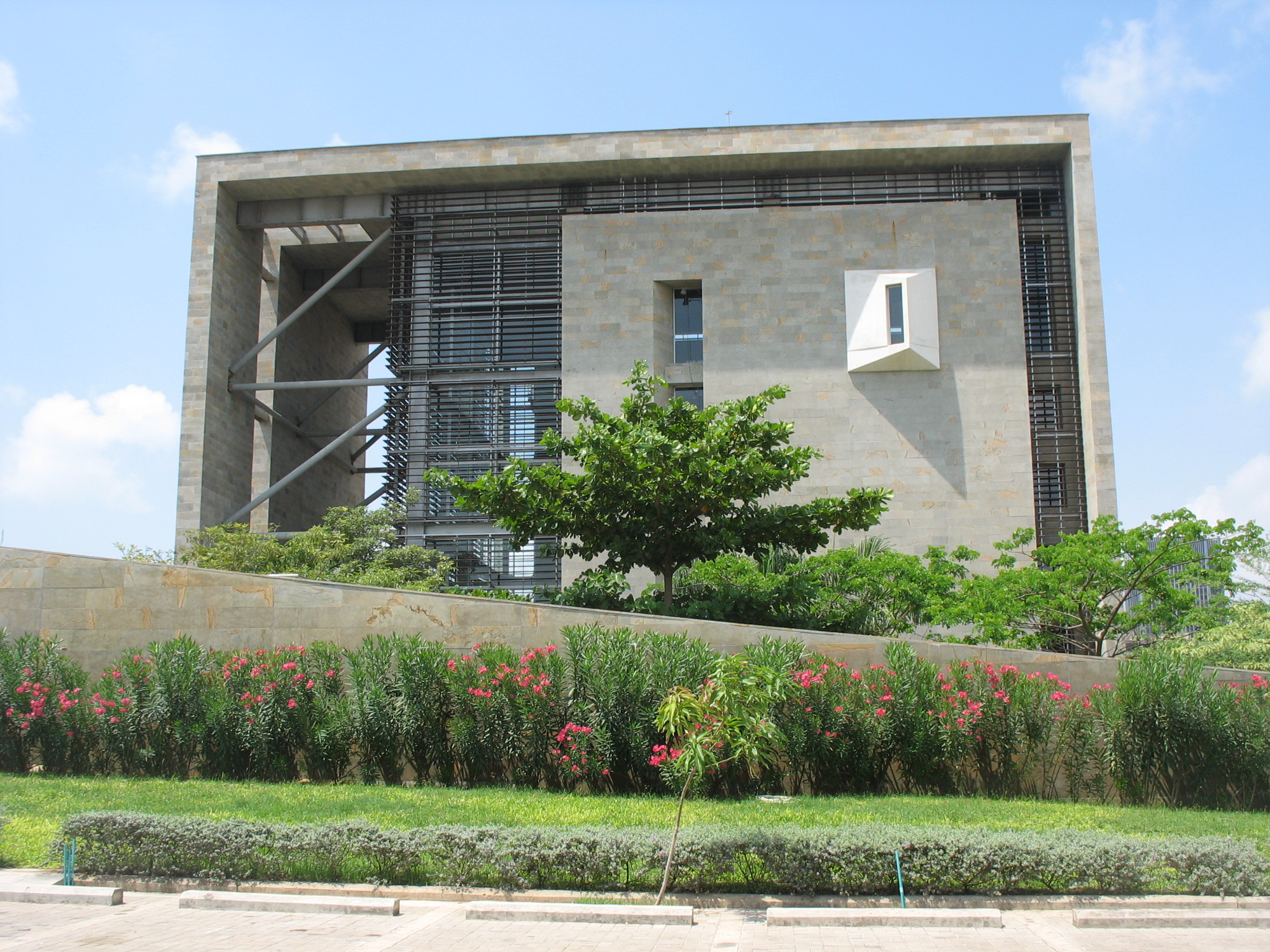
Parque Cultural del Caribe.

Parque Cultural del Caribe (Caribbean Cultural Park) is an ambitious cultural complex, unique in its kind in the Caribbean Region and Colombia. Conceived in the framework of the restoration of the historic center of the city, it promotes the natural, cultural and historical aspects of the Colombian Caribbean. It comprises the Museo del Caribe, La Biblioteca Infantil Piloto del Caribe, La Biblioteca Mediateca Macondo (specializing in the work of Gabriel García Márquez), a Documentation Centre, a Multi-Function Room and a public plaza outdoor theatre. The second phase of the development will be complemented by El Museo de Arte Moderno de Barranquilla and La Cinemateca del Caribe. Custom-Elbers cultural park. Plaza of the locomotive.

Centro Cultural Colombo Americano

Since its inauguration in 1956, Centro Cultural Colombo Americano is the icon of the culture of the United States and the English language in Barranquilla.

Mostly known as the "Colombo Americano", this institution is one of the bi-national centers (BNCs) in Colombia, autonomous, non-profit organizations created after the Second World War to contribute to good relations between Colombia and the United States.

As well as the other binational centers of the Centros Colombo Americano Network in Colombia, the Barranquilla Colombo Americano provides educational advising information about U.S education, testing service and the main English institute of the region. Its George Washington Library is the only public bilingual library in Barranquilla with an enormous stock of books and some other resources.

The Cultural Agenda of the Colombo Americano comprises a great variety of free activities and performances that articulate Colombian and American artists with the intellectual community in Barranquilla.

With the financial support of the U.S Department of the State, the Colombo Americano manages some fellowship programs for needy communities.

Former customs

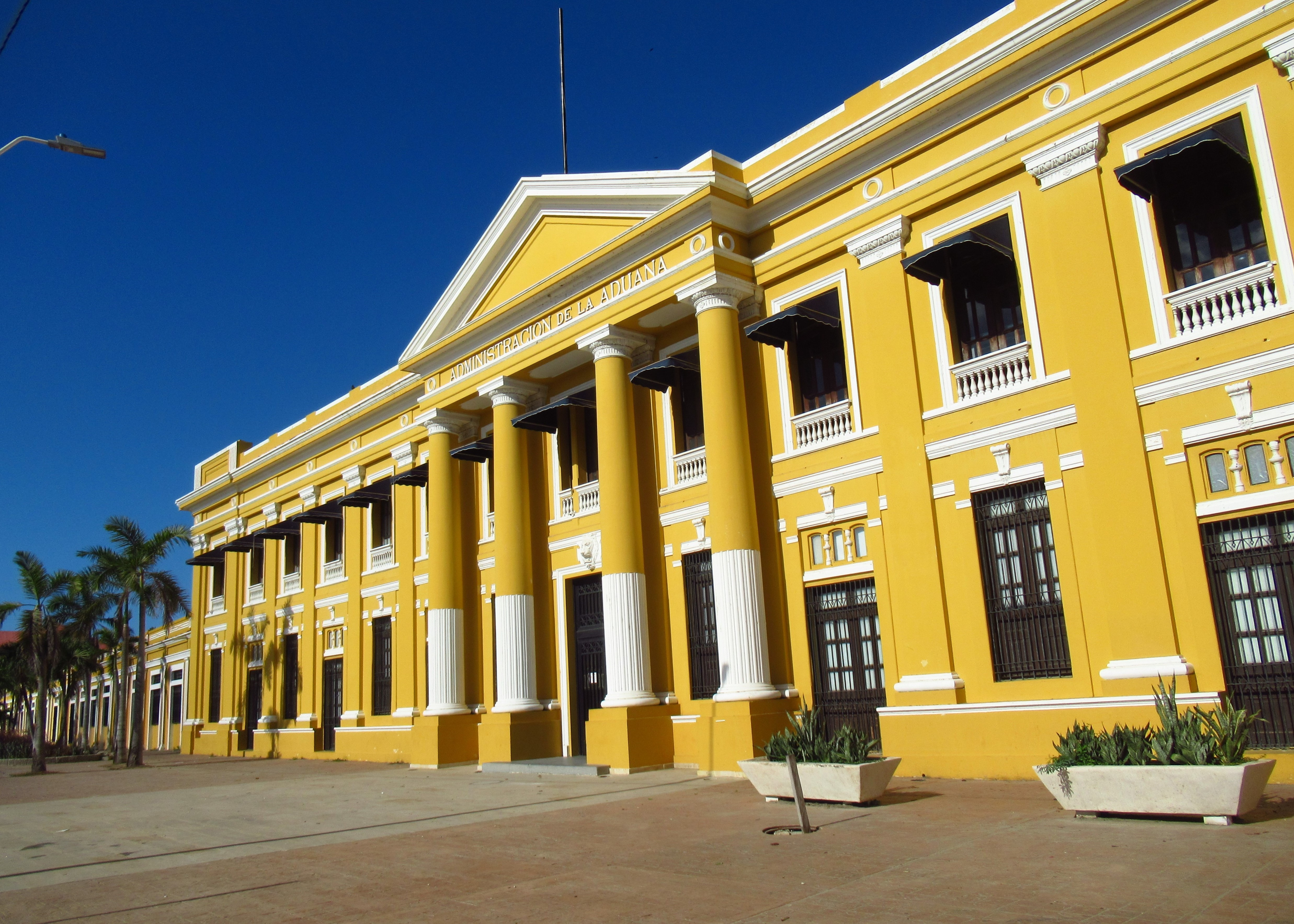
Complejo Cultural de la Antigua Aduana.

The Republican group of former customs buildings, known as the Complejo Cultural de la Antigua Aduana, were restored during the 1990s to house the Biblioteca Piloto del Caribe, File Histórico del Atlántico, Musical Documentation Centre, Estación Montoya, Parque Cultural Aduana-Elbers (consecrated in memory of Magdalena river transport pioneer Juan Bernardo Elbers), Pllaza de la Locomotora, and Alejandro Obregón's Simbología de Barranquilla, established in 1956 by the Banco Popular, which donated it to the Government of the Atlántico Department in 1994 for restoration.

Other

The restaurant-bar La Cueva became known for its cultural activity in the twentieth century. Other significant complexes are the Casa del Carnaval, Cinemateca del Caribe and the Planetario de Barranquilla.

== Culture ==
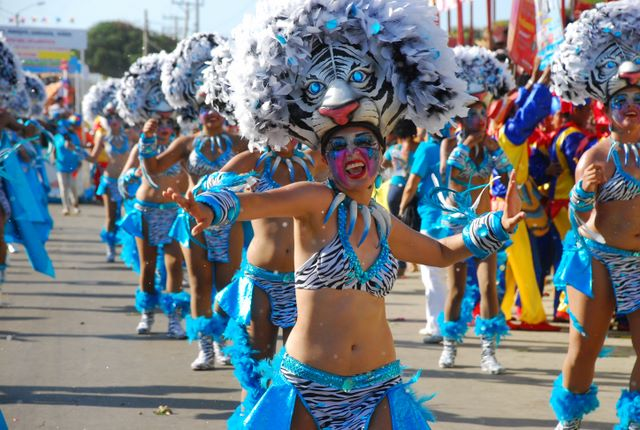
The carnival is the most important festival in Barranquilla

Throughout the year the city has a considerable number of cultural activities, and the best known event is the Carnival of Barranquilla, one of the most famous festivals in Colombia. It is a multicultural event that is held every year in February and welcomes the world to four days of celebrations, costumes, and parades highlighting the cultural traditions from the 19th Century. It is held annually during the four days preceding Ash Wednesday-Saturday, Sunday, Monday and Tuesday, usually in February or early March. In 2001 it was declared the "Cultural Patrimony of the Nation" by the National Congress of Colombia and in 2003 "Masterpiece of Oral and Intangible Heritage of Humanity" by UNESCO. The city is home to varied cultural displays such as folk dances, songs, games, legends, tales, and superstitions, among others, many of which reach their peak during the Carnival.

Barranquilla is home to many cultural events like art shows, exhibitions, literary workshops, philosophy talks, plays, poetry workshops, dances, exhibitions, concerts and festivals like the Festival de Orquestas under the Carnival and Barranquijazz. Since 1957, it has conducted the Concert of the Month, for the dissemination of classical music.

This cultural heritage is promoted in the city by the Institute of Culture and Tourism of Barranquilla, assigned to the Mayor, and entities such as the Centro Cultural Cayena of the Universidad del Norte, the Faculty of Fine Arts at the Universidad del Atlántico, Centro Cultural de Comfamiliar, Combarranquilla, Fundación Carnaval de Barranquilla, Banco de la República, Alianza Colombo-Francesa, Centro Cultural Colombo-Americano, Salón Cultural de Avianca, Corporación Luis Eduardo Nieto Arteta, Complejo Cultural de la Antigua Aduana, Biblioteca Piloto del Caribe, lBiblioteca Infantil Piloto del Caribe, File Histórico del Atlántico and the Centro de Documentación Musical Hans Federico Neuman; among many others.

=== Language ===
The accent spoken in Barranquilla is a sub-dialect of the broader Caribbean Spanish classification, which is the dialect spoken in the Caribbean coast of Colombia.

=== Folk music ===
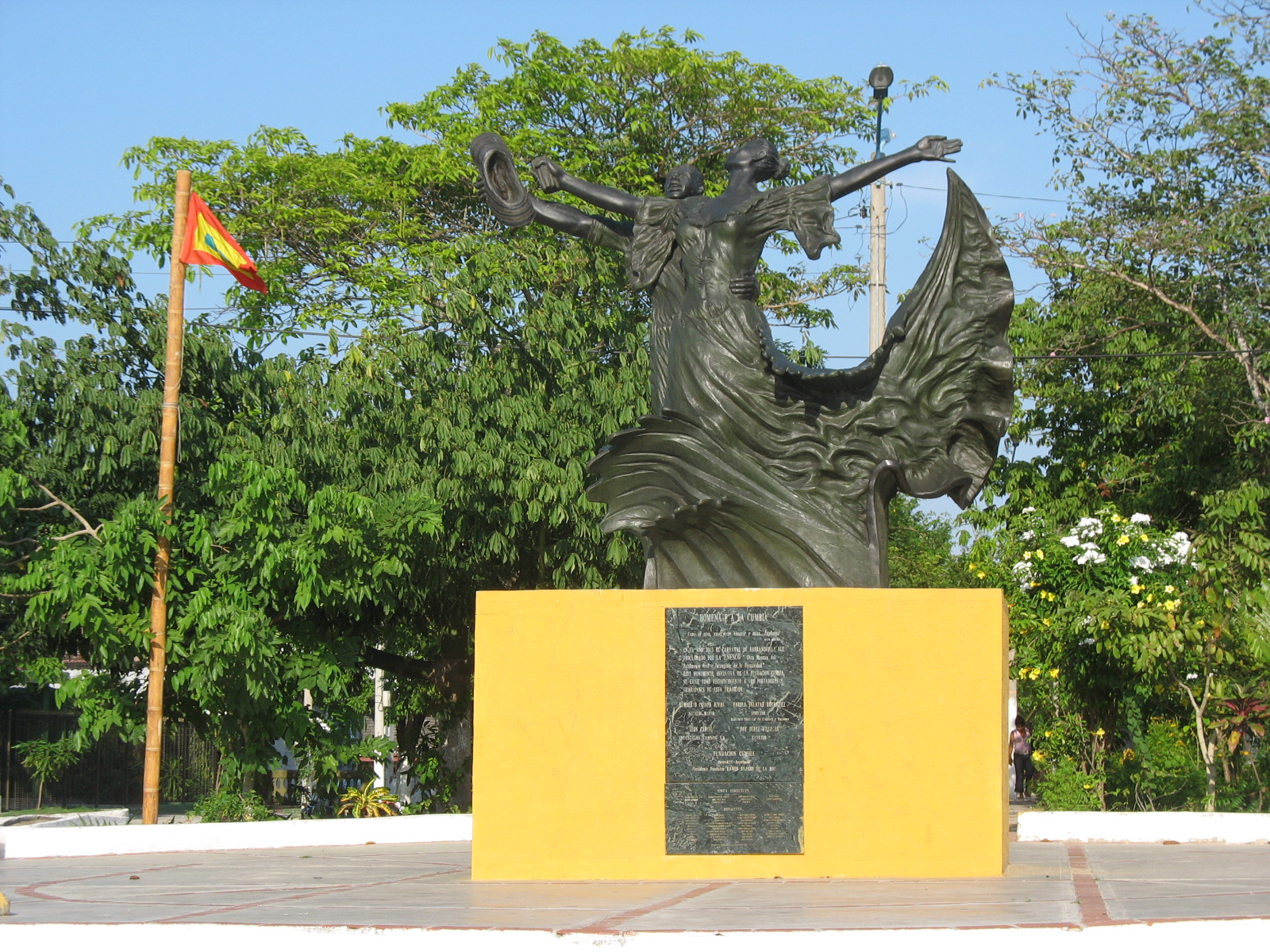
Monument in homage to cumbia

Cumbia is musical rhythm and dance most important and representative of the city, deeply rooted in the entire Caribbean region of Colombia. Other important musical rhythms are the jalao, puya, garabato, cumbión, chandé, porro, gaita, bullerengue, merecumbé, vallenato and pajarito. Other traditional dances are Congo, Mapalé, Son de Negro, Diablos, Gusano and Farotas. Also represented is the Marimondas, the Monocucos and the Toritos and those associated with the famous Carnaval de Barranquilla.

Famous salsa singer Joe Arroyo was an avid lover of the city and its carnival, as can be heard in songs such as "En Barranquilla Me Quedo" and "Carnaval" from the 1988 album Fuego En Mi Mente. He lived a large part of his life in Barranquilla and after his death, also in Barranquilla, was buried in the city's cemetery. A statue in his honor was inaugurated on December 17, 2011, known as "La Estatua del Joe Arroyo". On November 9, 2011, Shakira, born in Barranquilla, performed a cover of Arroyo's song "En Barranquilla Me Quedo" at the Mandalay Bay Events Center as a tribute to the singer when she was honoured as Latin Recording Academy Person of the Year.

=== Events ===
In addition to the Carnival of Barranquilla and related activities, some of the most important cultural events in the city are: Barranquijazz, jazz festival which brings together major international figures of jazz, held in September at the Amira de la Rosa Theatre, among other places, Carnaval de las Artes, a cultural event uniting intellectuals, writers, filmmakers, musicians and artists of national and international reputation, Feria Artesanal y Folclórica (Craft and Folk Fair) on the eastern side of the stadium, Feria del Juguete (Toy Fair), a great sale of toys during the month of December in the grounds of the Universal cemetery, Festival Internacional de Cuenteros El Caribe Cuenta with humor and stories which is held annually in August, Plataforma K. Evento, an annual fashion event organized by the Chamber of Commerce of Barranquilla held in March at the Universidad del Norte, Salón de Artistas Costeños, an art festival organised annually by the Chamber of Commerce of Barranquilla, and the Miche Rock Festival, supported by the District Department of Culture of Barranquilla and the Departmental Secretariat of Culture.

Barranquilla serves a wide variety of cuisine to match its cosmopolitan population and tourists. Restaurants can be enjoyed from Creole cuisine to some of the most important international cuisines, such as Syrian-Lebanese (due to the significant presence of descendants of immigrants from the Middle East), Chinese, Japanese, Brazilian, Peruvian, French, Italian, Thai, Spanish etc. The typical dish of the city is plain rice, which is served with cassava buns. Very characteristic of the local cuisine is a pigeon pea stew called sancocho de guandú (or guandul), with salted meat (which even has its own annual festival), butifarras soledeñas, suero, queso costeño, fried arepas, carimañolas, empanadas, cupcakes, patacones, black bean rice, chipichipi and cucayo; noodles, drinks like raspao, boli, sugar water, tamarindo, zapote and níspero, coconut candies and Easter candy, cake, fish, shrimp and oysters, beef, chicken, pork and chicken dishes and pork rinds. Cazuela de mariscos, a seafood stew, is also a typical dish found in Barranquilla. Chuzo desgranado, a fast food dish, is also from the region.

== Education ==
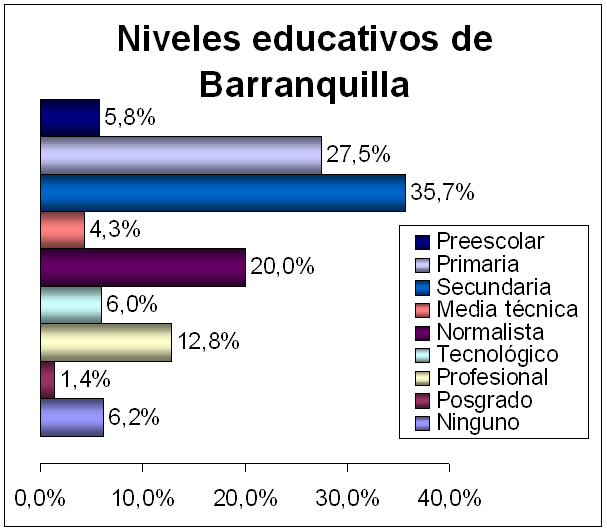
Educational attainment by the people of Barranquilla (2005).

Education in the city is regulated by the Ministry of Education and the District Mayor. The city offers the national education system in their levels of primary and secondary education and university, and multiple technical and technological institutions. In recent decades, Barranquilla received a number of students, who could not pursue higher education studies in the absence of institutions in their places of origin. This had tended to decrease in recent years due to increased educational opportunities has been achieved in these regions. Some of the personalities who have contributed to the educational development of the city have been Manuel María Salgado, a pioneer of high school in Barranquilla, founder of the Instituto de Barranquilla in 1849, the German educator Karl Meisel, founder of the Colegio Ribón in 1881 which became the Colegio de Barranquilla in 1908, Julio Enrique Blanco, founder of Universidad del Atlántico, Ramón Renowitzky, Secretary of Education in the mid-twentieth century and Turkish educator and translator Alberto Assa.

According to the census conducted by DANE in 2005, 66.5% of the population of 3 to 5 years, 89.2% of the population aged 6 to 10 years and 83.7% of the population aged 11 to 17 years attend a formal educational institution. 12.8% have reached the professional level and 1.4% have specialized degrees, master or doctorate. The resident population without any education is 6.2%. 94.1% of the population 5 years and over are literate.

=== Universities ===
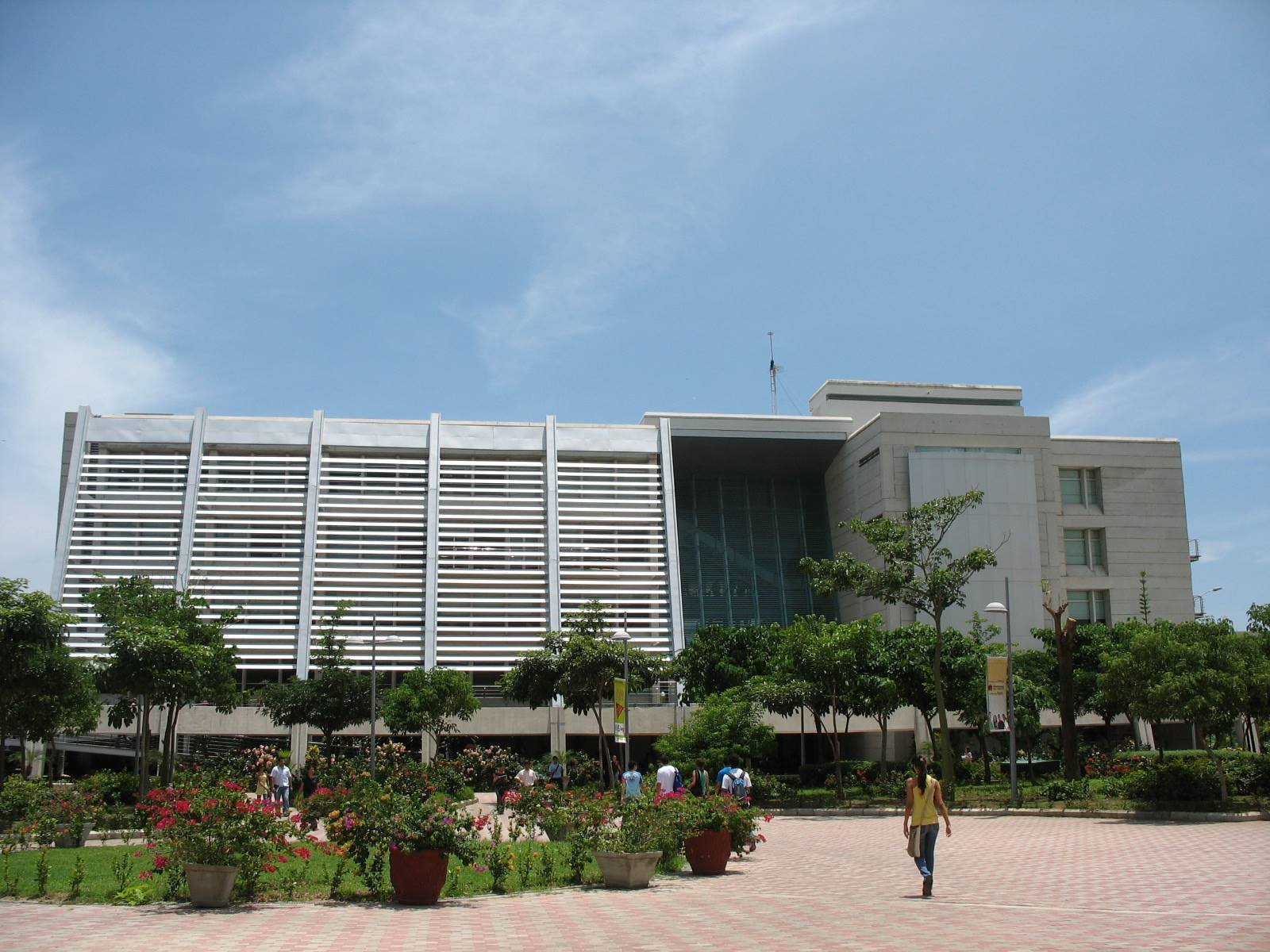
The Graduate School Building of the Universidad del Norte.

Barranquilla is home to several universities with high academic standards and research, including Universidad del Norte, Universidad del Atlántico, Universidad Autónoma del Caribe, Universidad Libre Seccional Barranquilla, Universidad Simón Bolívar, Universidad Metropolitana, Corporación Universitaria de la Costa, Universidad Antonio Nariño, and Fundación Universitaria San Martín.

At the undergraduate level, courses offered by different universities include engineering (systems, civil, mechanical, electronic, industrial, chemical, electrical and environmental), the health sciences (medicine, nursing, physiotherapy, bacteriology, nutrition, optometry, dentistry, social work, occupational therapy, speech therapy, surgical instrumentation and microbiology), economic and administrative sciences (business administration, economics, accounting, finance, international business), basic sciences (mathematics, physics, microbiology, chemistry, biology), education (social, natural, physical education, preschool, math, Spanish, foreign languages), the social sciences (philosophy, history, sociology, psychology, social communication, international relations), fine arts (music, visual arts, performing arts, architecture), and legal sciences (law, political science), among others.

In terms of graduate studies, Universidad del Norte offers fifteen doctoral programs, including Social Science, Industrial Engineering, Mechanical Engineering, and Psychology, and Universidad del Atlántico offers a doctorate in Science Education. Universidad del Norte offers a significant number of master's degrees in various branches of learning such as engineering, health sciences, education, environment, and administration. Other universities offering master's studies are Atlántico, Simón Bolívar, and Universidad Autónoma del Caribe.

=== Secondary and technical institutions ===
The city also has secondary education institutions, public and private high school, several of which rate high in the country, according to studies conducted by ICFES.

The State National Training Service has an important work in the technical and technological training. In Barranquilla there are 4 SENA centres: the Centre for Trade and Services, Aviation and Industry, the Colombo-German National Centre and the Cedagro Centre for Agroecology Development and Agribusiness. Since 2009, the city has Instituto Tecnológico de Soledad Atlántico (ITSA) which offers courses in technical subjects such as electromechanical maintenance, electronics, telecommunications, computing, industrial processes, agro-industrial production, foreign trade and international business, business management etc. ITSA has around 9,600 students from low income strata 1 and 2.

=== Educational expansion ===
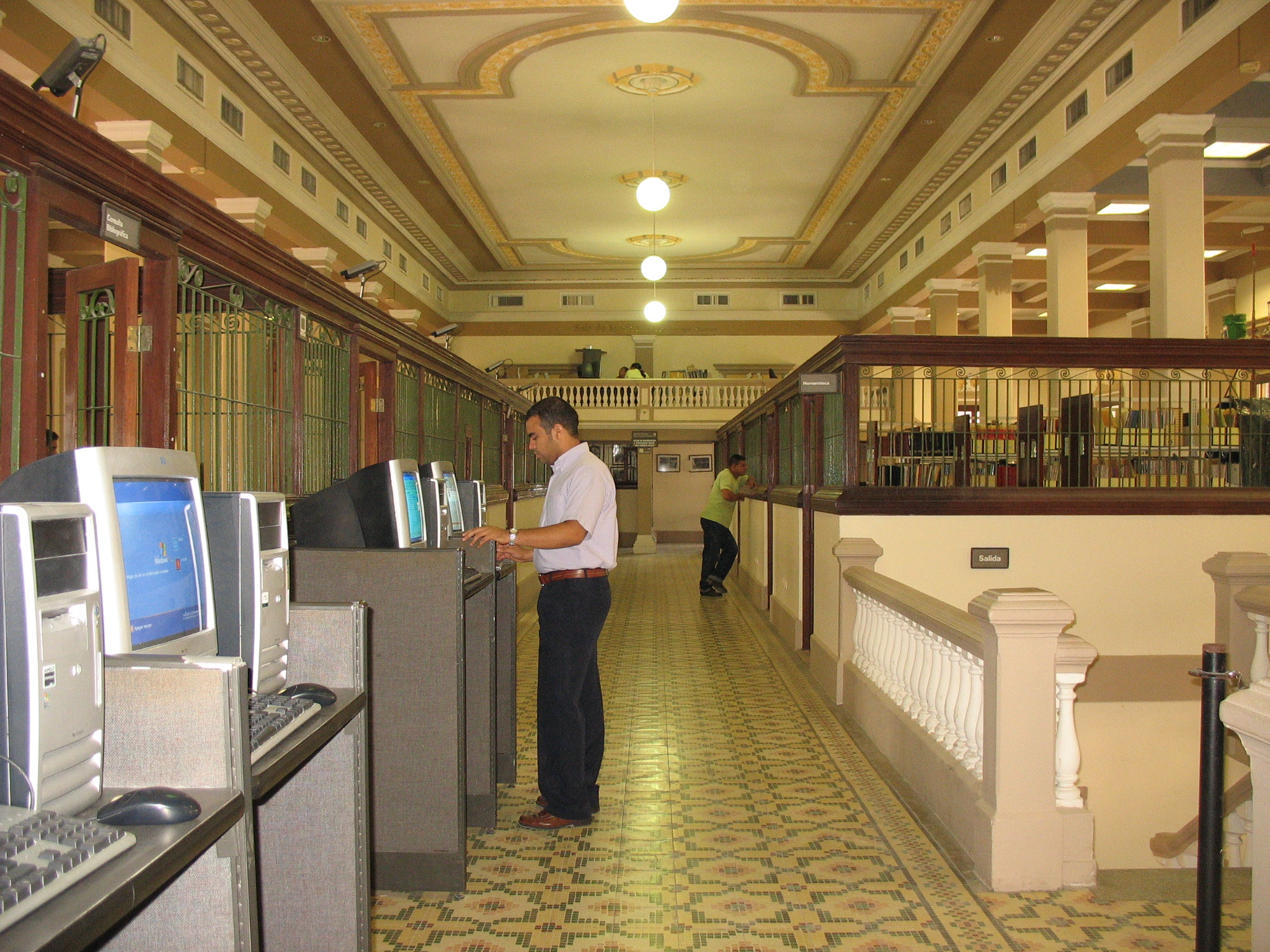
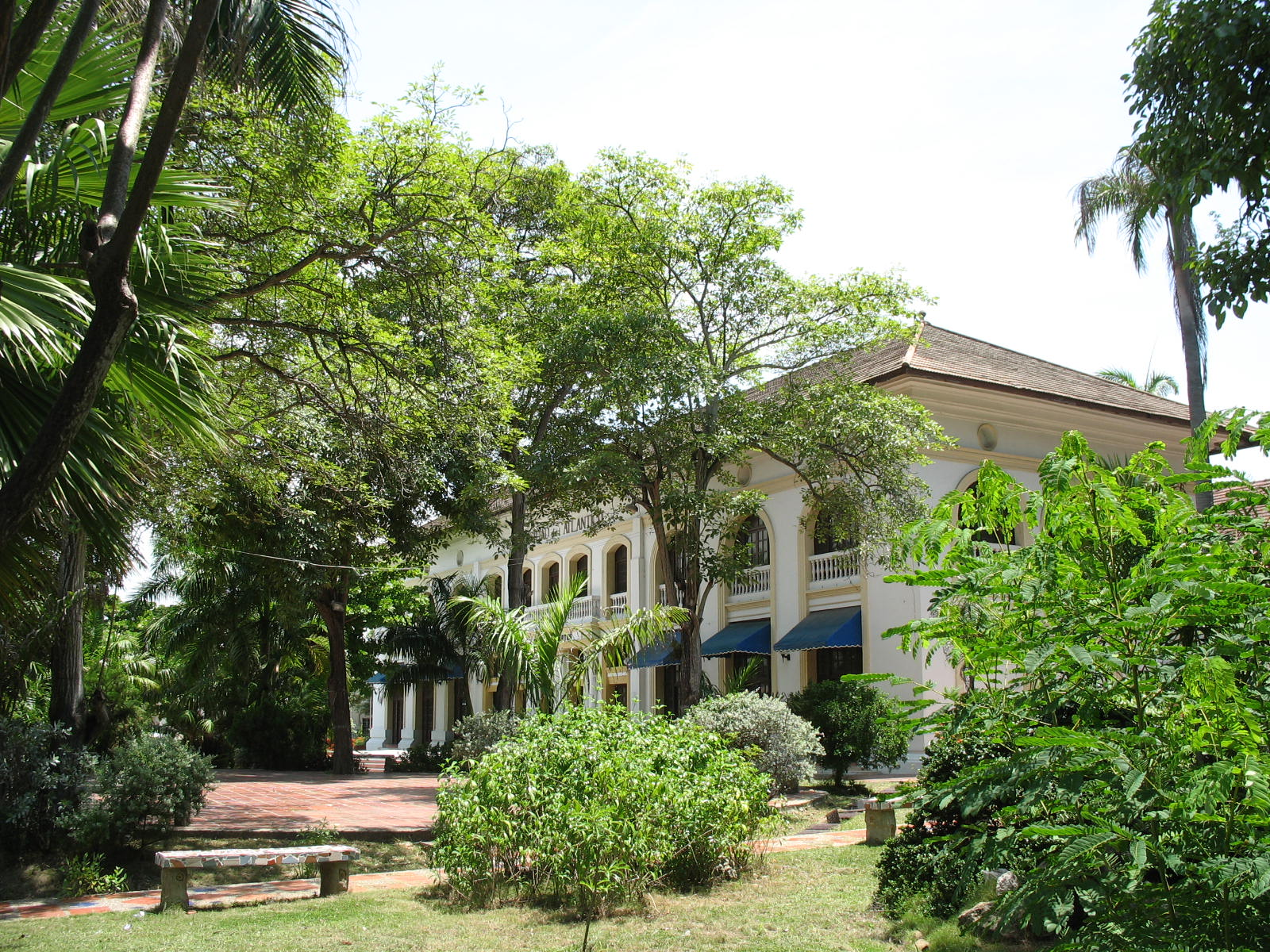
Left: Biblioteca Piloto del Caribe. Right: Faculty of Fine Arts at the Universidad del Atlántico

Since 2008, the city has embarked upon an ambitious plan to reduce the deficit in school places by building educational parks in the neighborhoods of Las Américas, Lipaya, 7 de abril and Rebolo through property integration. These parks will have community services such as library, auditorium, computer rooms, sports facilities and classrooms. Similarly, for 2010 is 4 modern colleges with a total capacity for 5,760 students, two in Las Cayenas, one in Ciudadela Veinte de Julio and one in Lipaya, each with a capacity of 1440 students. In February 2009, the college Pies Descalzos was opened in La Playa, built by Shakira, and endowed by the District through community resources, with a capacity for 1,800 students.

=== Science and research ===
Science and research are mainly in the universities at the request of state policies defined by the National Science and Technology, the National Innovation System and Colciencias. Universidad del Atlántico is the institution with research groups such as Colciencias which recognized and registered with the International Network for Information and Knowledge Sources for Sciences, Technology and Innovation. The universities are engaged in scientific research in various fields such as medicine, chemistry, geophysics, biology, physics, microbiology, law, history, philosophy, Caribbean culture, telecommunications and the various branches of engineering.

Among the public libraries in the city include the Barranquilla Departmental Library, the Biblioteca Piloto del Caribe and Julio Hoenigsberg. Also notable are the libraries of universities, especially Atlántico and Norte universities.

== Transport ==
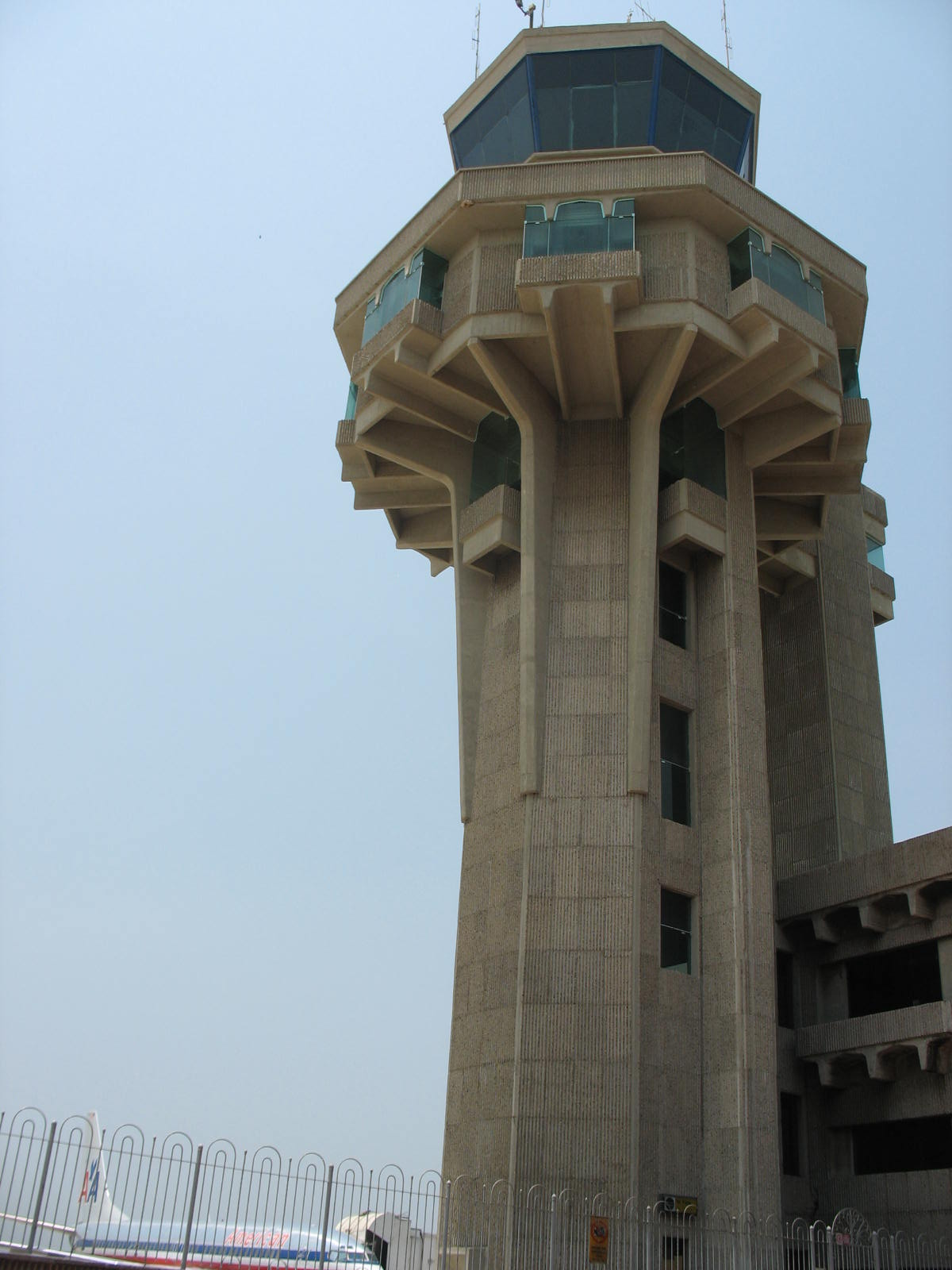
The first airport in South America: Barranquilla's Ernesto Cortissoz International Airport (1919)

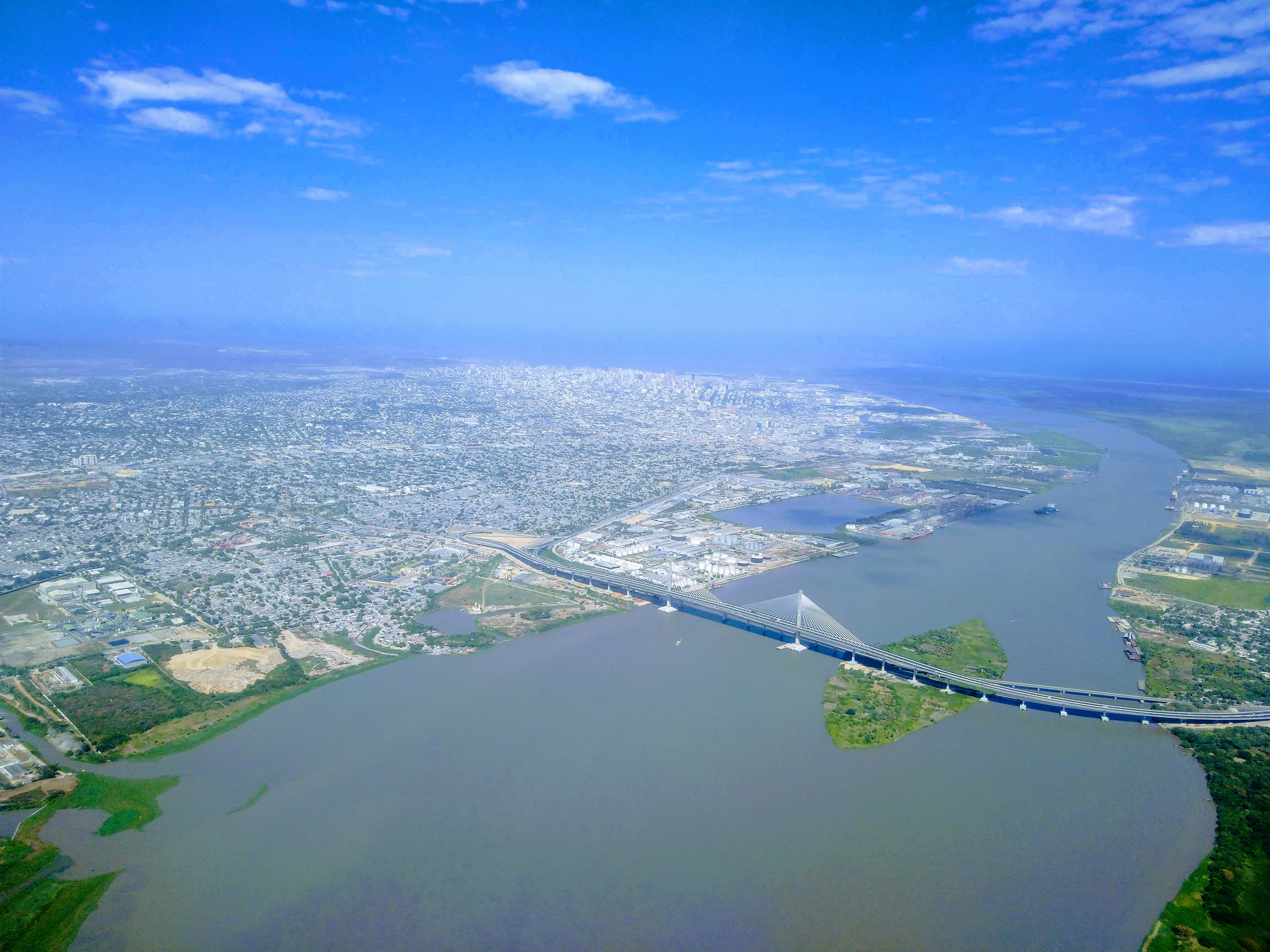
Pumarejo Bridge

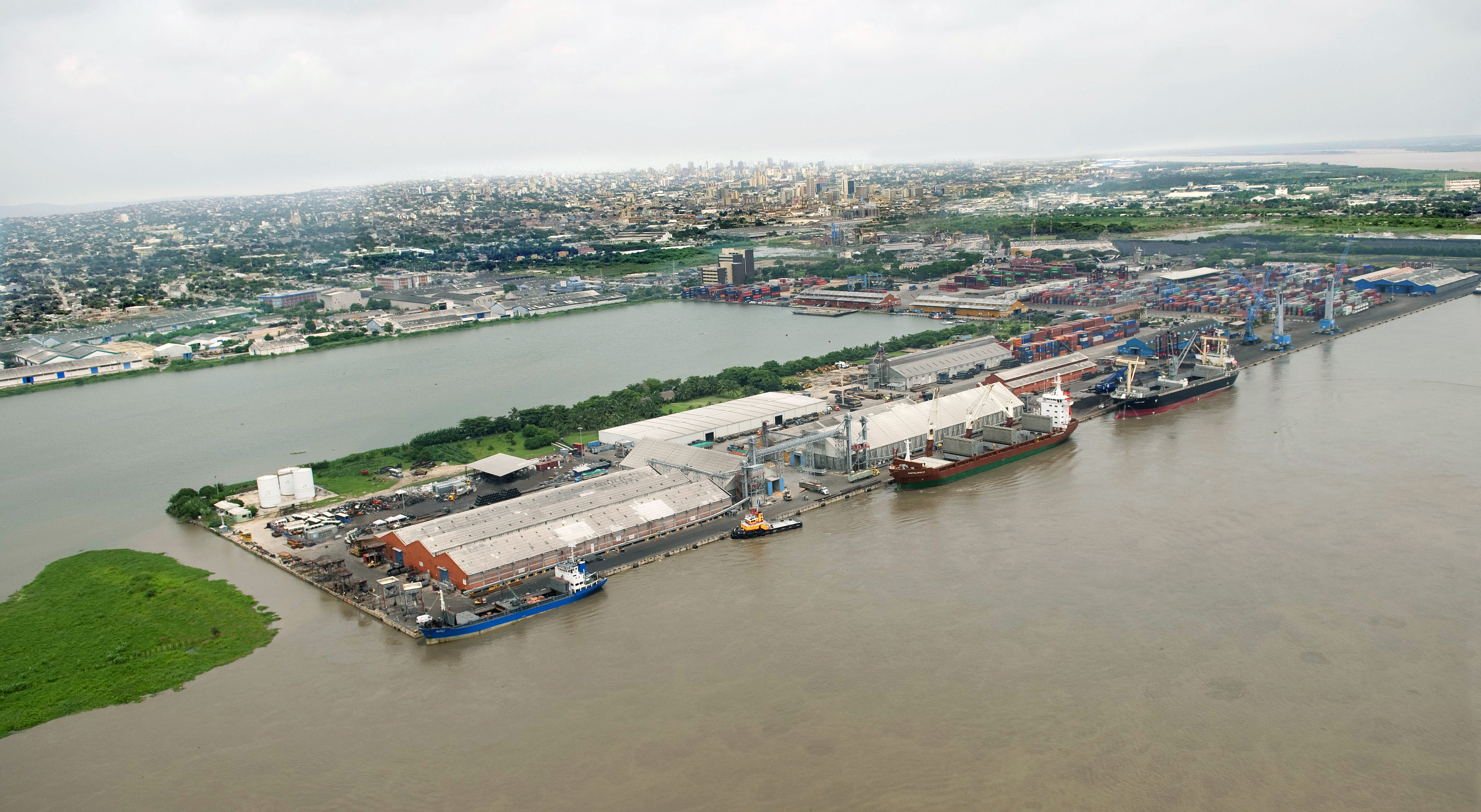
Port of Barranquilla

Ernesto Cortissoz International Airport was built in Barranquilla in 1919, becoming South America's first. The city is served by domestic and international flights.

Pumarejo Bridge over the Magdalena River is one of the most prominent civil engineering works in the city, and the longest in Colombia at just over 1.5 km (0.9 mi). The traffic in the city and its metropolitan area is governed from 2009 by the Ministry for Mobility.

In 2001, the district administration started developing TransMetro metropolitan mass transit system. This transport system uses articulated buses traveling on exclusive lanes and stations where passengers board on. In 2015 the system was used by about 110000 people daily. A light rail line is currently in the planning stages.

In 2010, the taxis operate a minimum charge of COP 4300 (US$2.17) for a distance of up to 3.5 km (2.2 mi). To cover distance races over the minimum, the fee is negotiated directly with the driver and can reach up to COP 20,000 (US$11.4) depending on the distance covered. Taxi service can also be contracted by the hour, COP 15,000 (US$7.58). Several private companies provide taxi service in the city, which can be ordered by telephone for safety. In 2015, Uber began operating in the city.

Bus and minibus fares vary depending on model and amenities such as air conditioning. Prices are visible in the windshield of the vehicle and range from COP 1,300 to COP 1,500. Bus transportation is very common among locals.

In the municipality of Soledad, south of the city, is the Metropolitan Transportation Terminal in Barranquilla, from which one can travel by land to major domestic destinations and Venezuela.

Barranquilla has a major sea and river port, third largest by cargo volume in the country. The waterborne terminal is managed, operated and marketed by the private Sociedad Portuaria Regional de Barranquilla. Traffic through the port of Barranquilla is regulated by the Captain of the Port of Barranquilla, which is responsible for the direction, coordination and control of maritime activities such as arrivals, departures, status of ships, safety, licensing, advertisements, among others.

=== Barranquilla Public Transportation Statistics ===
The average amount of time people spend commuting with public transit in Barranquilla, for example to and from work, on a weekday is 77 min. 17% of public transit riders, ride for more than 2 hours every day. The average amount of time people wait at a stop or station for public transit is 15 min, while 20% of riders wait for over 20 minutes on average every day. The average distance people usually ride in a single trip with public transit is 5.9 km, while 5% travel for over 12 km in a single direction.

== Sports ==
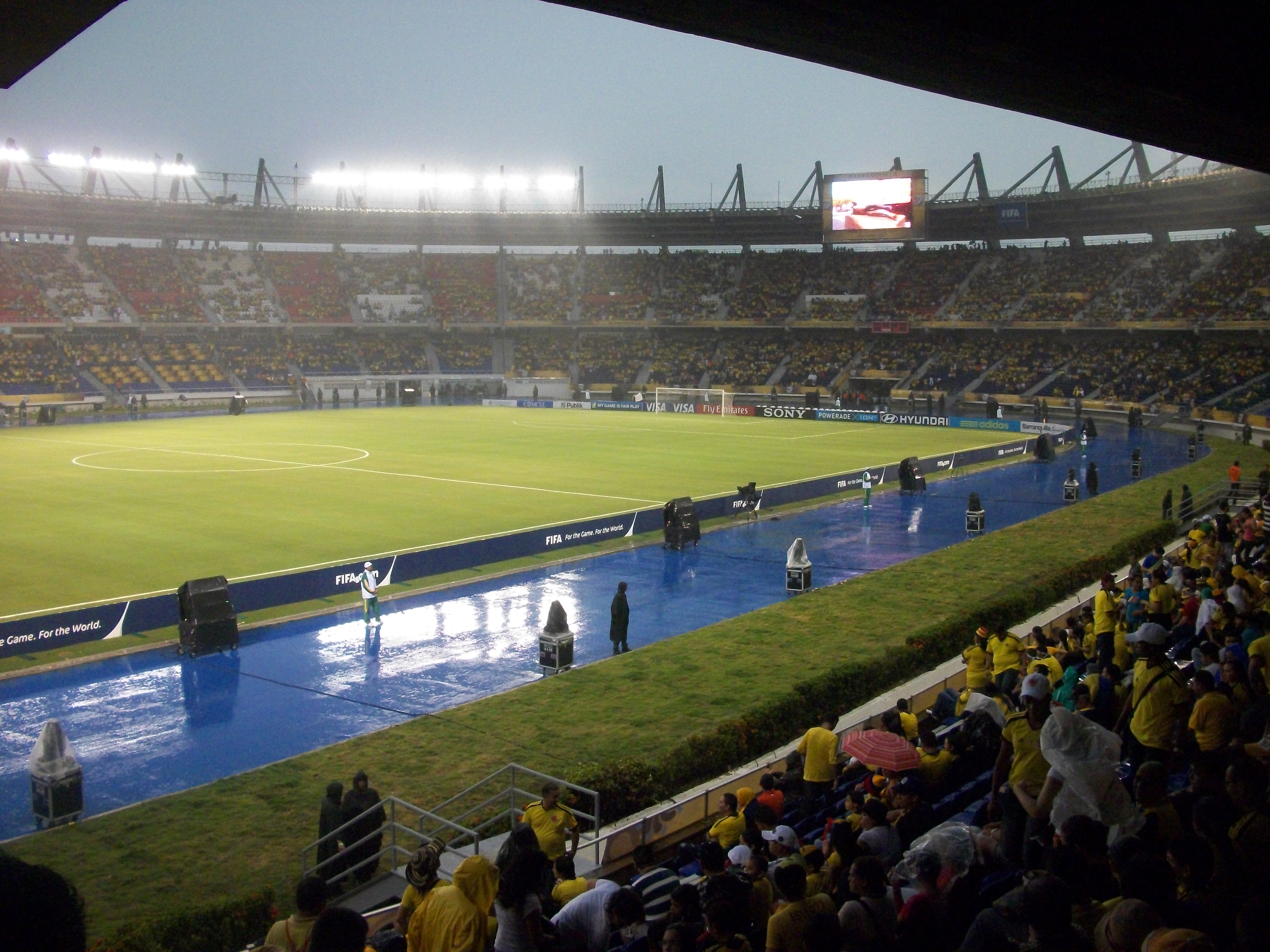
Estadio Metropolitano Roberto Meléndez, home stadium of Colombia national football team.

Sports in Barranquilla are promoted at the governmental level by the Ministry of Sports and Deportes de la Alcaldía Distrital. Since the early twentieth century, the most important sports have been football, baseball and boxing. Also practiced are basketball, athletics, swimming, chess, cycling, skating, bowling, tennis, golf, shooting, karate, taekwondo, paragliding, BMX, go-karts, motor sports, fishing, squash, surfing, weightlifting and softball.

Barranquilla has hosted the Colombia national football team during World Cup qualifiers for Italy (1990), USA (1994), France (1998), Germany (2006), Brazil (2014), Russia (2018), and Qatar (2022). It was home of the XIV National Games in 1992, co-host of the Central American and Caribbean Games in 2006 and was the host the 23 edition of the Games in 2018; host of the 5th Central American and Caribbean Games in 1946, home of the Bolivarian Games IV in 1961 and hosted the games in Group A in the Copa América 2001. In 2011, it hosted the opening match of the U20 World Cup to be held in Colombia from July 29 to August 20.

=== Stadiums and venues ===
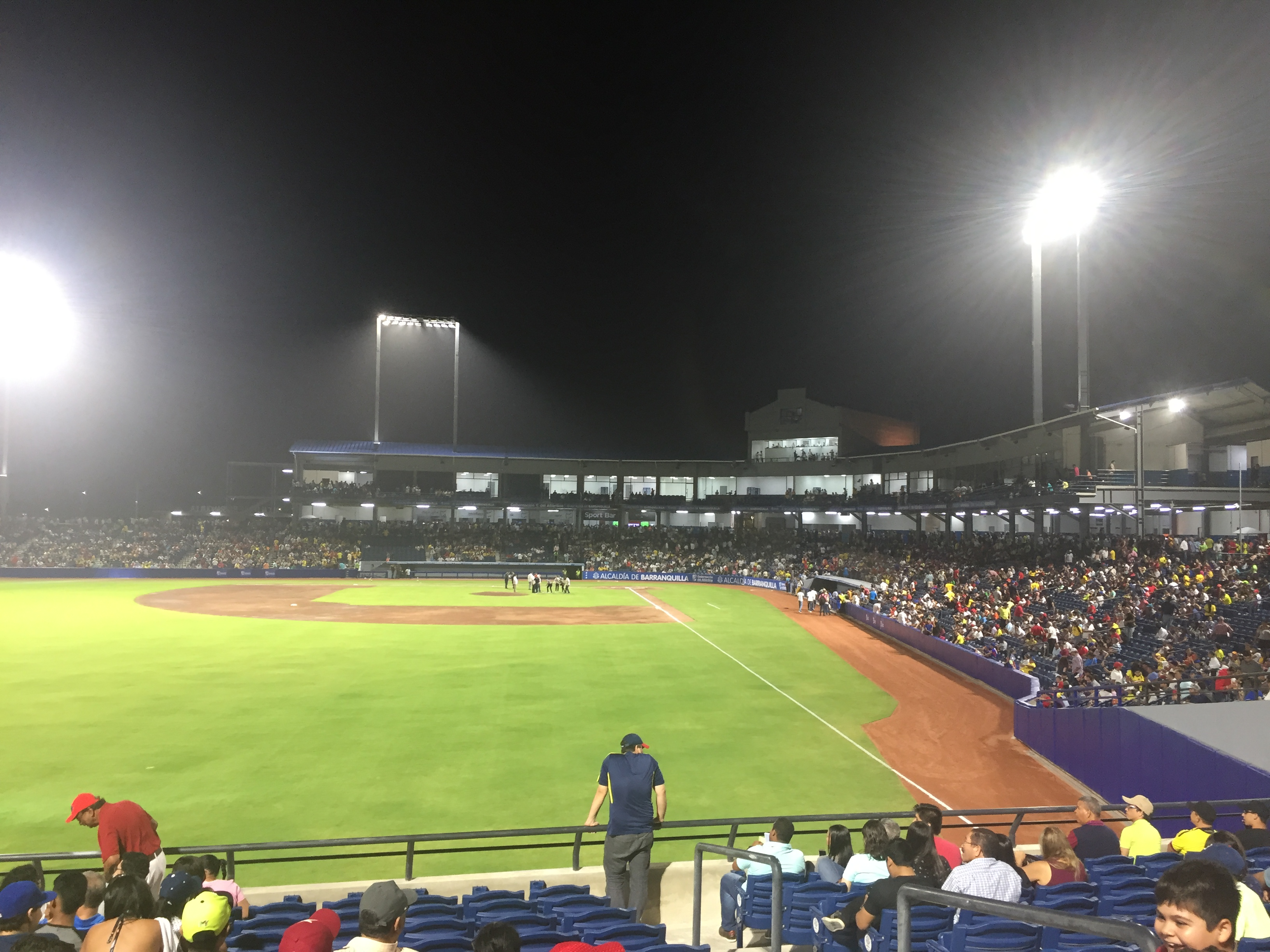
Baseball park Estadio Édgar Rentería

The city has a developed sports infrastructure, which has enabled it to host international events, such as the Central American and Caribbean Games in 1946, the Bolivarian Games of 1961 among others and the 2018 version of the Central American and Caribbean Games.

Estadio Metropolitano Roberto Meléndez opened on May 11, 1986, with capacity for 49,612 spectators. It has a football field, running track for distance running, long jump and javelin and hammer. It was the headquarters of the Colombia national football team during World Cup qualifiers for 1990, 1994, 1998 and 2006.

Estadio Romelio Martínez was built in 1935 for the III National Olympic Games, capacity for 20,000 people. In 2018 was renewed to host the Central American and Caribbean Games.

The former Estadio Tomás Arrieta was built in 1946 for the V Central American and Caribbean Games and rebuilt in 2018 to host the Central American and Caribbean Games. It is now called the Estadio Édgar Rentería to honor the emblematic big leaguer from Barranquilla. The new stadium has a capacity for 12,000 attendees.

Estadio de Baloncesto Elías Chegwin opened in 1992 and also renewed in 2018 to host the Central America and the Caribbean Games. It has 3,000 seats available and it is the only sports arena in Colombia with air conditioning.

Velódromo Metropolitano Rafael Vásquez also opened in 1992 as part of the XIV National Games.

The Olympic Pool Complex is a modern site that was also rebuilt in 2018 to host the Central America and Caribbean Games. It has 2,130 seats available.

The city also has a shooting and skating rink, "Rafael Naranjo Pertuz" (1992) which has inside a roller hockey court, tennis courts, a BMX track, bowling alley, and sports centres in the neighborhoods Lipaya, La Magdalena and San Felipe, among others.

In August 2024, Barranquilla co-hosted the 2024 U-15 Baseball World Cup with Cartagena.

=== Teams ===
The city has hosted several teams that have played professional football in Colombia, Club Deportivo Popular Junior F.C. competes in the first division, and Barranquilla F.C. in the second division. Universidad Autónoma del Caribe Fútbol Club has its administrative headquarters in Barranquilla, playing at the Marcos Henríquez de Sabanalarga Other professional teams that were based Barranquilla was the Juventud Junior (promoted to the first category in 1929 and renamed Atlético Junior in 1936), Deportivo Barranquilla (f. 1949), Sporting (f. 1950), Libertad (f. 1956) and Unicosta (f. 1995). As for baseball, Caimanes de Barranquilla is the city team in the Colombian Professional Baseball League. Barranquilla had the basketball team Caimanes, Colombian professional tournament champion three times, 1995, 1997 and 1998.

Active sports teams in Barranquilla
Team	League	Sport	Stadium	Founded	Champions
Club Deportivo Popular Junior F.C.	Primera A	Football	Estadio Metropolitano Roberto Meléndez	1924	14
Caimanes BBC	LCBP	Baseball	Estadio Tomás Arrieta	1984	14
Barranquilla F.C.	Primera B	Football	Estadio Romelio Martínez	2005	0
Titanes de Barranquilla	Baloncesto Profesional Colombiano, Basketball Champions League	Basketball	Arena Deportiva Elías Chegwin	2018	4

=== Formula One ===
On October 31, 2022, the mayor of Barranquilla, Jaime Pumarejo, received Formula One CEO Stefano Domenicali, the manager of the Mexico City Grand Prix and manager to Fernando Alonso Luis García Abad, and some other promoters of the Mexico City Grand Prix in Barranquilla to discuss a possible Formula One race to be hosted in the city, which would be called the Caribbean Grand Prix. According to Pumarejo, two different plans for semi-street circuits have been approved by local authorities, both within the metropolitan area of Barranquilla, and one of them running partially alongside the Magdalena River. If the plan were to become reality, an inaugural grand prix in either 2024 or 2025 would be targeted with, "hopefully", a 10-year contract. Then-Colombian president Iván Duque announced the state's support for the project, highlighting, as well as Pumarejo, the financial and touristic benefits it would bring to the city, region, and country.

== Healthcare ==
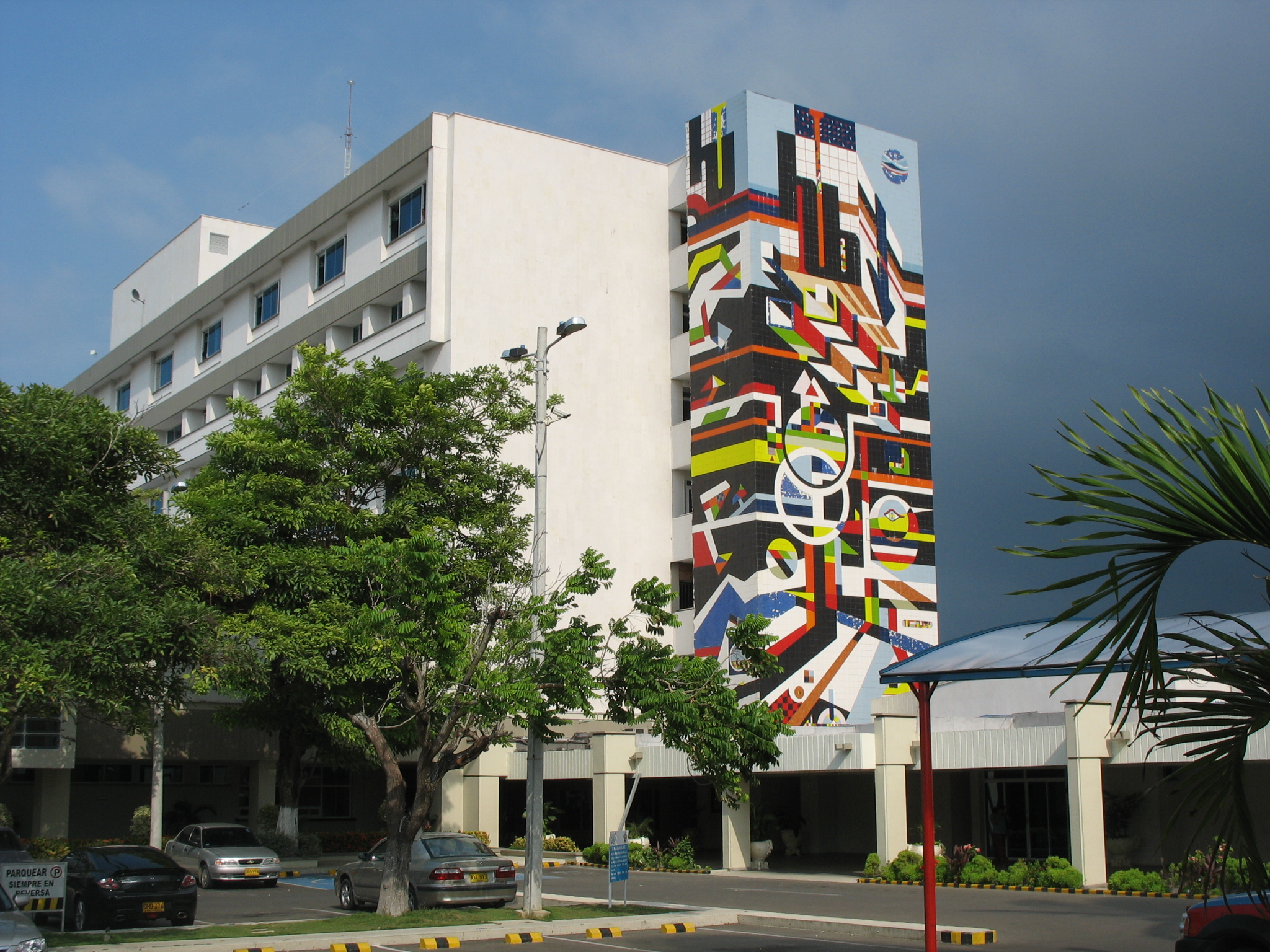
Hospital Universitario Cari E.S.E-Sede de Alta Complejidad.

Health in Colombia is governed by legislation (Act 100 of 1993) and is regulated by the Ministry of Social Protection. At the local level, it is in charge of two state institutions, the Ministry of Health and the State Social Enterprise Caprecom as administrator of the hospital administrative units (four hospitals, 6 Maternal Units and Child Health Centres) to replace the Public Hospital Network (Redehospital), in liquidation. Other institutions include the Colombian Red Cross, the Colombian Civil Defense, in charge of emergencies, calamities and natural disasters, and the Colombian Family Welfare Institute (ICBF), responsible for the comprehensive protection of the family and children.

Some of the notable public hospitals of the city are Hospital General de Barranquilla, Hospital Pediátrico de Barranquilla, Hospital Nazareth, Hospital La Manga, Hospital Universitario Metropolitano. Hospital Universitario Cari E.S.E, Hospital de la Universidad del Norte, Hospital Niño Jesús and Hospital del Seguro Social and the 6 maternal-child units of Santa María, La Playa, La Chinita, Las Flores, La Alboraya and Juan Mina. The city also contains 19 health centres and 28 health posts. At each location of the city, a center or health post. These institutions can provide services to primary and secondary care, with the exception of the Pediatric Hospital, which serves partial third level. In addition, the city operates a large number of private clinics that serve high levels of complexity (3 and 4) and multiple medical specialities.

== Media ==
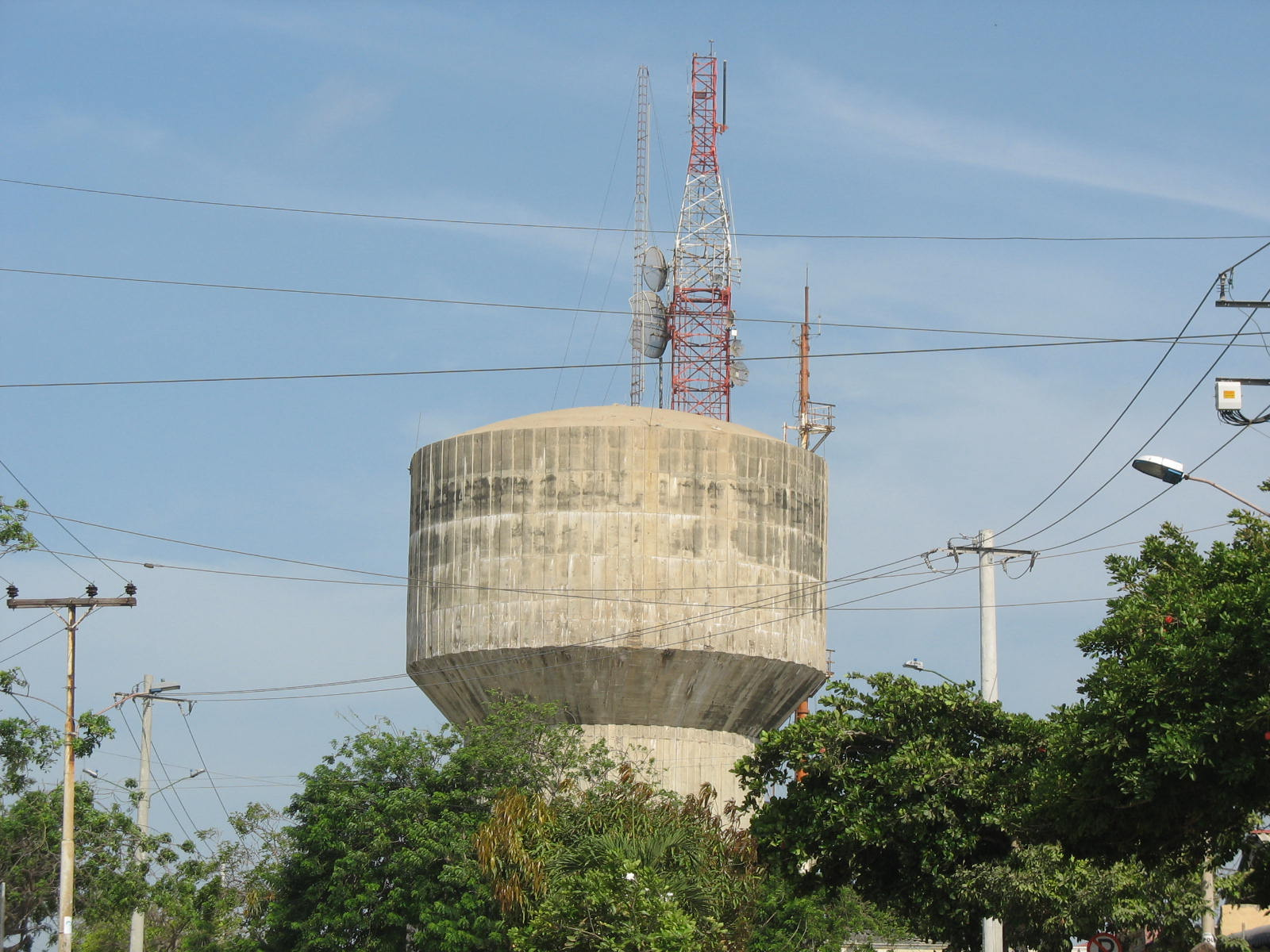
Torres de telecomunicaciones

=== Television ===
From 1986, the Colombian Caribbean Coast has the Telecaribe regional television, which has its operational headquarters in the city. In addition, Barranquilla operate local television channels TB3 (cable) Channel 23 at the Autonomous University of the Caribbean (open signal) and the five national television channels (RCN TV, Caracol TV, Canal Uno, Señal Colombia and Institutional). The Canal Universitario Nacional Jerusalem TV (Channel LUZ) is also transmitted from Barranquilla.

=== Radio ===
Barranquilla transmits various AM and FM stations, both local and national, which keep the public informed and provide a varied musical program. Of particular note is Radio Libertad.

=== Press ===
The city's two main newspapers are El Heraldo and La Libertad. Other dailies include newspapers of nationwide distribution, such as Bogotá's El Tiempo.

== Music ==
Barranquilla is mentioned in the Hank Snow song "I've Been Everywhere", which was most famously covered by Johnny Cash. Barranquilla native Shakira mentions the city in her songs "Hips Don't Lie", “TQG” and "La Bicicleta".

== Notable people ==
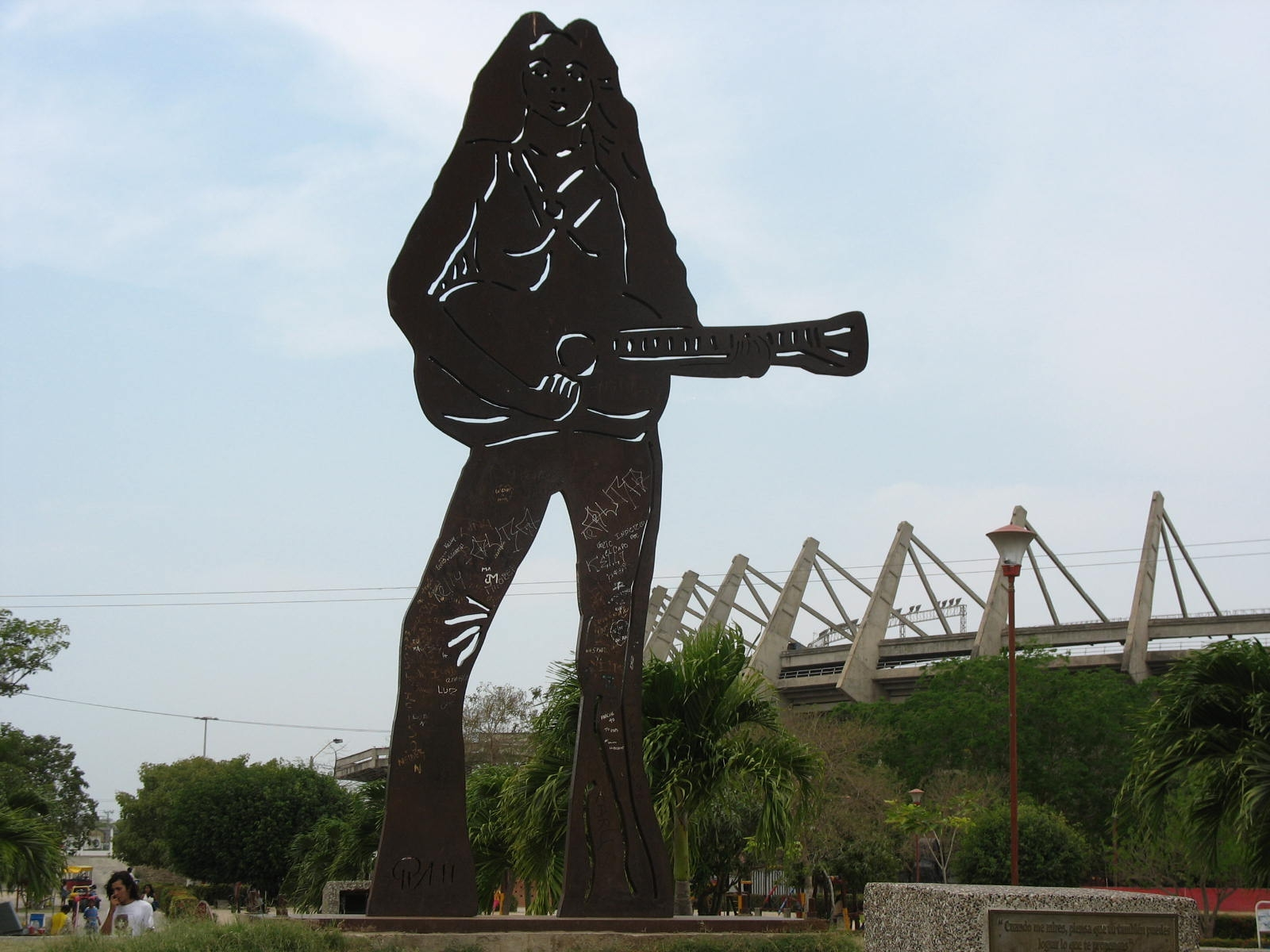
Statue of Shakira

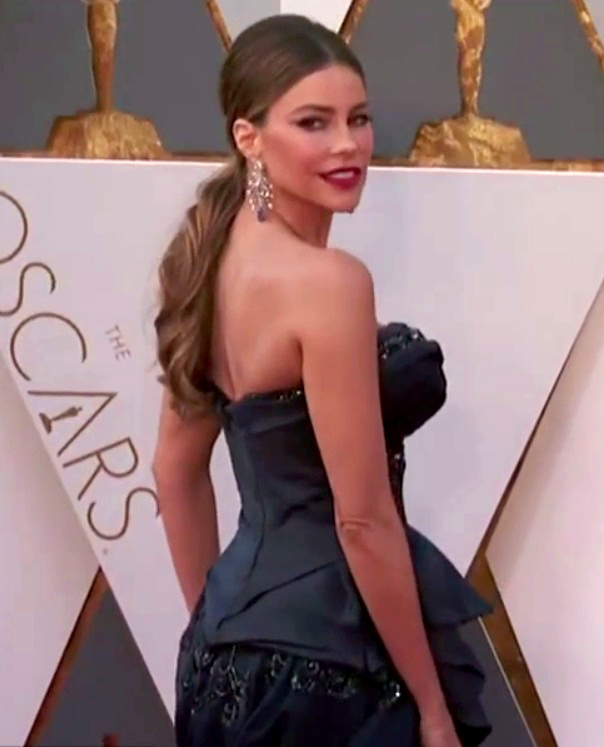
Sofía Vergara at the 2016 Oscars

- Daniella Álvarez
- Andrés Cabas
- Sofia Carson
- Álvaro Cepeda Samudio
- Rory Enrique Conde
- Amira de la Rosa
- Luis Eduardo Díazgranados, businessman
- Valerie Domínguez
- Esther Forero
- Nina García
- Ariadna Gutiérrez, Miss Colombia 2014 and first runner-up at Miss Universe 2015
- Teófilo Gutiérrez
- Salomón Hakim
- Michelle Harper
- Natasha Klauss
- Maía
- Javier Jattin, actor, model
- Roberto McCausland Dieppa Composer and conductor of Sinfonia Latina
- Mario Miranda, professional boxer and world title challenger
- Edgar Perea
- Édgar Rentería
- Maritza Rodríguez
- Isabella Santodomingo
- Julio Mario Santo Domingo
- Shakira
- Donovan Solano (born 1987), Colombian baseball second baseman for the Texas Rangers
- Jhonatan Solano
- Carlos Torres
- Silvia Tcherassi
- Paulina Vega, Miss Colombia 2013 and Miss Universe 2014
- Aníbal Velásquez
- Sandra Vergara
- Sofía Vergara
- Carmen Villalobos

== Sister cities ==
- Tula, Russia
- Buenos Aires, Argentina
- Kaohsiung, Taiwan
- Nanjing, People's Republic of China
- Brownsville, Texas, United States
- Tampa, Florida, United States
- Miami, Florida, United States
- Aberdeen, Scotland

== In popular culture ==
- Barranquilla is mentioned in the Hank Snow adaptation of the Geoff Mack song "I've Been Everywhere", which was later covered by more than 130 artists including Johnny Cash.
- Shakira mentions her hometown Barranquilla in the hit song Hips Don't Lie, with the line "En Barranquilla se baila asi" (translated as: "In Barranquilla they dance like this")

== See also ==
- Shakira statue
