= Sabanalarga, Atlántico =

Sabanalarga
- Municipality and town
- Flag Coat of arms

- Location of the municipality and town of Sabanalarga, Atlántico in the Atlántico Department of Colombia

- Location in Colombia
- Coordinates: 10°37′52″N 74°55′16″W
- Country: Colombia
- Department: Atlántico Department
- Founded: 1620
- Incorporated: 1833

Government
  - Mayor: Roberto Carlos León Peña

Area
  - Municipality and town: 395.9 km^{2} (152.9 sq mi)
  - Urban: 7.36 km^{2} (2.84 sq mi)
- Elevation: 87 m (285 ft)

Population (2020 est.)
  - Municipality and town: 100,049
  - Density: 252.7/km^{2} (654.5/sq mi)
  - Urban: 74,713
  - Urban density: 10,200/km^{2} (26,300/sq mi)
- Demonym: Sabanalarguero
- Time zone: UTC-5 (Colombia Standard Time)
- Area code: 57 + 3
- Website: Official website (in Spanish)

Sabanalarga (Spanish pronunciation: [saβanaˈlaɾɣa], Spanish for "Long Plain") is a municipality in the Atlántico Department, Colombia. Founded in 1620 by Lucas Dionisio Tesillo y Diego and Marceliano de Jesús Almanza. It became a municipality in 1680.

== Geography ==
Sabanalarga is located in the middle of the Atlántico Department. It is surrounded to the north by the municipalities of Usiacurí, Baranoa, and Polonuevo; to the east by the municipality of Ponedera; to the south by the municipalities of Candelaria, and Manatí; to the southwest by the municipality of Repelón and to the west by the municipalities of Luruaco and Piojó.

== Notable people ==
- Juana de J. Sarmiento (1899–1979), politician, activist
- Mauro Manotas (1995-) Football player for Tijuana
