= Levith Rúa =

Convicted Colombian-Venezuelan serial rapist and child murderer

Levith Aldemar Rua Rodríguez (born October 14, 1987), known as The Beast from the Slaughterhouse and The Monster from the Sixth Entry, is a Colombian-Venezuelan former policeman, serial rapist and murderer.

He committed more than a dozen rapes and sexual assaults in the Caribbean region, in addition to killing Gabriela Romero, a business student studying at SENA.

Rúa is known to have been active in various places along the Caribbean Coast, including: Barranquilla, Soledad, Malambo, Valledupar, Cesar, Sincelejo, Sucre and others.

On March 22, 2019, he was sentenced to 37 years imprisonment for raping a minor, which he is serving at the Maximum and Medium Security Prison in Valledupar.

== Background ==
A native of Ponedera, Rúa joined the ranks of the Colombian Police between 2008 and 2010. He was attached at the Cesar Department, where he served as a patrolman. In 2010, he was found guilty of raping and assaulting a woman in Valledupar, for which he served a 7-year prison sentence. He served the sentence in the Maximum and Medium Security Prison, known commonly as "La Tramacúa", where he shared a cell with serial killer Luis Garavito, whom, according to the Office of the Attorney General of Colombia, kidnapped, raped, tortured and murdered at least 172 children across the country.

After serving time, Rúa continued to abuse several women between the ages of 15 and 18, according to police. It is believed that the crimes took place at a hut in Malambo, where furniture, underwear for both sexes, condoms and other items were located. Before his detention, he had raped a Venezuelan woman and murdered Gabriela Romero, a SENA student.

== Modus operandi ==
Rúa's modus operandi consisted of contacting people through social networks, where he offered jobs. He lured the victims to desolate areas, usually full of trees and shrubbery, where he sexually, physically and verbally abused them. Some of the attacks ended with serious injuries, such as fractured jaws and broken teeth due to the severe beatings.

== Murder of Gabriela Romero ==
Gabriela Romero was a SENA student. She was contacted by the former police officer on Facebook, although at first, it appeared that Romero ignored his questions and comments. In the end, however, she was persuaded to start a serious conversation, with the supposed job being her taking care of a child for 800 pesos. After agreeing to the offer, the two met in a shopping center in Barranquilla and left for a wooded area known as "El Tamarindo", in Malambo. This sector was known for its local slaughterhouse, where cattle, buffalo and pigs were butchered. Once they arrived there, Rúa beat, raped and then decapitated Romero.

== See also ==
- List of serial rapists
