= Margarita Cabello Blanco =

Colombian lawyer

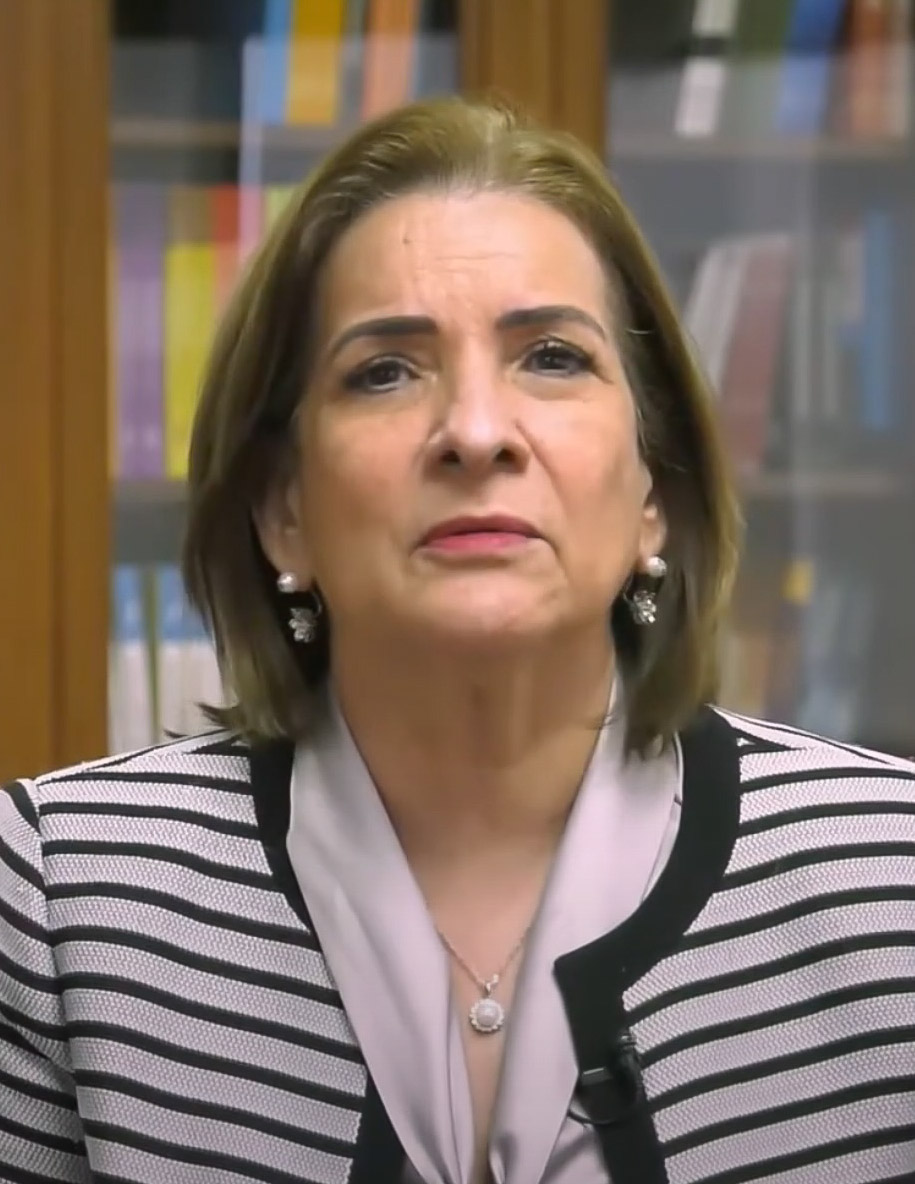
- Margarita Cabello Blanco in 2022

Attorney General of Colombia
- In office January 15, 2021 – January 15, 2025
- President: Iván Duque Márquez; Gustavo Petro Urrego
- Preceded by: Fernando Carrillo Flórez
- Succeeded by: Gregorio Eljach

Minister of Justice and Law
- In office June 11, 2019 – August 17, 2020
- President: Iván Duque Márquez
- Preceded by: Gloria María Borrero
- Succeeded by: Javier Sarmiento

President of the Supreme Court of Justice
- In office March 23, 2016 – January 25, 2017
- Preceded by: José Leonidas Bustos
- Succeeded by: José Leonidas Bustos

Personal details
- Born: Margarita Leonor Cabello Blanco; February 12, 1957 (age 69) Barranquilla, Colombia
- Party: Democratic Centre
- Education: University of the Coast; Autonomous University of Bucaramanga; Universidad Externado de Colombia

Margarita Leonor Cabello Blanco (born February 12, 1957) is a Colombian lawyer. From January 2021 to January 15, 2025, she served as Attorney General of the Nation, elected for a four-year term by the Senate from a shortlist of candidates nominated by the President of the Republic, the Supreme Court of Justice, and the Council of State. She served as Minister of Justice and Law during the government of Iván Duque, from June 2019 to August 2020, when she resigned to participate in the 2021 election for Attorney General as Duque's candidate. She is the first woman elected to the highest Public Prosecutor's Office, on August 27, 2020, and assumed office on January 15, 2021.

Cabello is recognized for her long judicial career and political connections; she is considered close to the Uribismo and the traditional ruling class of the Atlántico Department. In 2009, Cabello was among the three candidates nominated by the Supreme Court of Justice for the position of Attorney General of the Nation, at the initiative of former President Álvaro Uribe. Cabello served as President of the Supreme Court of Justice from March 2016 until mid-January 2017. Her election was carried out by the Plenary Chamber of the Supreme Court of Justice.

== Biography ==
=== Studies ===
Margarita Cabello studied Law at the University of the Coast, in Barranquilla. She later continued her postgraduate academic training, specializing in Family Law at the Autonomous University of Bucaramanga and Civil Procedural Law at the Universidad Externado de Colombia.

=== Career ===
She began his working career in the city of Barranquilla as a clerk in the 1980s. He continued his work as a criminal judge in the municipality of Sabanalarga, Atlántico. By 1983 he had become the Third Juvenile Judge, a position he held until 1985. In that same year he served as the Sixth Civil Circuit Judge in Barranquilla.

She worked as Head of Legal Affairs for two months at a company called Corporación Financiera del Norte (Cofinorte), a company of the Santo Domingo Group. After her brief stint at the financial corporation, Margarita Cabello served as a Magistrate of the Family Court until 1996 and continued as a Magistrate of the Civil-Family Court until 2009, both positions held in her hometown. She also worked for a time as coordinator of the Rodrigo Lara Bonilla Judicial School (1999 to 2002). From 2009 until mid-February 2013, she served as Delegate of the Disciplinary Chamber at the Office of the Attorney General of Colombia. On February 25, 2013, she was sworn in as President of the Civil Cassation Chamber of the Supreme Court of Justice, elected by the Plenary Chamber.

She has been awarded the José Ignacio de Márquez Medal by the Superior Council of the Judiciary, the highest recognition granted in the country in this branch, as well as multiple awards as best magistrate of the year.

== Attorney General ==
In 2020, Cabello Blanco was elected by the Senate as the nation's first female Attorney General with the support of the governing parties Radical Change, Democratic Centre, Colombian Liberal Party, Colombian Conservative Party, Union Party for the People, and the Christian-based parties Mira and Colombia Justa Libres.

=== Criticism ===
Cabello has been questioned about ideological bias in her decision-making as Attorney General, a situation she has dismissed. In her inaugural address, she was criticized for referring to Iván Duque's government as "our government," which, according to some analysts, cast doubt on the independence of the oversight body she leads, whose function is to monitor, among others, that government.
