= Andrés Sarmiento =

Colombian footballer (born 1998)

Personal information
- Full name: Andrés De Jesús Sarmiento Salas
- Date of birth: 15 January 1998 (age 28)
- Place of birth: Luruaco, Colombia
- Height: 1.76 m (5 ft 9 in)
- Position: Left winger

Team information
- Current team: Atlético Nacional
- Number: 29

Youth career
- 2014–2018: Atlético Nacional

Senior career*
Years	Team	Apps	(Gls)
2016–2020	Atlético Nacional	9	(1)
2018	→ Excel Mouscron (loan)	4	(0)
2019	→ Cúcuta Deportivo (loan)	17	(0)
2020	→ Alianza Petrolera (loan)	12	(2)
2021	Atlético Bucaramanga	17	(5)
2022	Vizela	12	(0)
2023–2024	América de Cali	46	(13)
2024–	Atlético Nacional	60	(11)
- * Club domestic league appearances and goals as of 1 December 2025

Andrés De Jesús Sarmiento Salas (born 15 January 1998) is a Colombian footballer who plays as a left winger for Atlético Nacional.

== Club career ==
=== Atlético Nacional ===
Sarmiento was raised in a small town called Los Pendales in the municipality of Luruaco, Atlántico in Colombia. In an interview in 2017, Sarmiento explained that he "started playing on the streets and had the opportunity to perform in several short tournaments and some teams that my dad organized". He arrived at Atlético Nacional in 2014. In 2015, he became the topscorer of the Mundial Juvenil Sub-17 de Clubes played in Spain scoring five goals, with teams as Real Madrid and Atlético Madrid also participating. He was rewarded with getting promoted to the U-20 squad in 2016, where he also became the topscorer of the U20 tournament.

Scoring a lot of goals in the youth teams, Sarmiento got his official debut for Atlético Nacional in the Categoría Primera A 16 August 2016 against Boyacá Chicó. Sarmiento started on the bench, before replacing Andrés Ibargüen in the 78th minute. However, including his debut, Sarmiento only played 197 minutes across all tournaments between 2016 and 2018 for the Nacional's first team. He instead played nearly all the games for the U-20s, scoring 26 goals in 2017.

In the summer 2018, Sarmiento travelled to Belgium, where he went on a trial at Belgian First Division A club Royal Excel Mouscron. It took him about three months to convince the club, before signing a loan deal in October 2018 with the Belgian club for the rest of the year. He made four league appearances, while he also made one in the Belgian Cup. In January 2019, Sarmiento returned to Atletico. After returning, he made two appearances for Atlético Nacional, before being loaned out to Cúcuta Deportivo.

Scoring no goals in 17 games for Cúcuta Deportivo, he was loaned out once again in January 2020 to Alianza Petrolera for the rest of the year.

=== Atlético Bucaramanga ===
For the 2021 season, Sarmiento joined Atlético Bucaramanga. He got his officiel debut for the club on 20 January 2021 against Boyacá Chicó, where Sarmiento also scored.

=== Vizela ===
On 18 January 2022, Sarmiento joined Portuguese Primeira Liga side Vizela on a deal until June 2025. He got his official debut on 13 February 2022 against Gil Vicente in the Primeira Liga.

=== América de Cali ===
On 31 December 2022, Sarmiento signed with América de Cali.

=== Return to Atlético Nacional ===
In July 2024, Sarmiento returned to Atlético Nacional; his childhood- and first club as professional.
