= Simón Bolívar University (Colombia) =

- Universidad Simón Bolívar
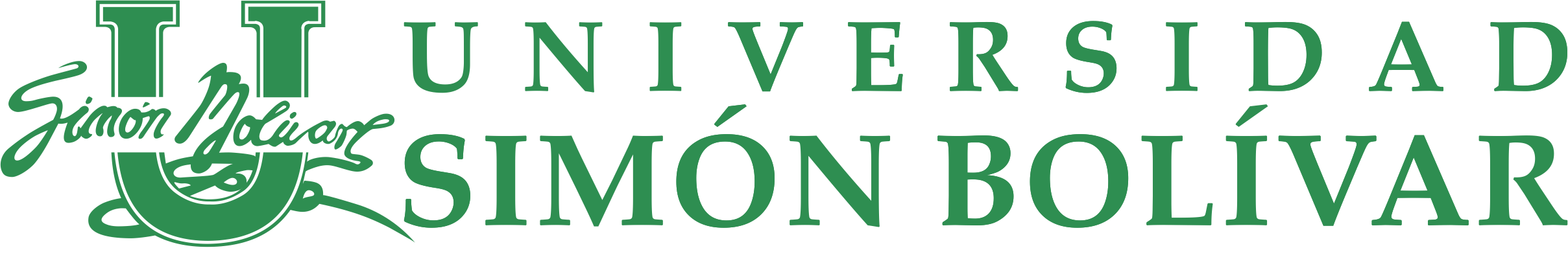
- Type: Private
- Established: October 15, 1972
- Rector: José Eusebio Consuegra Bolívar
- Undergraduates: 10,613
- Location: Barranquilla, Cúcuta, Colombia
- Campus: Urban
- Colors: Green; White
- Nickname: Unisimón
- Website: https://unisimon.edu.co/

Simón Bolívar University, also known as Unisimón, is a university located in Barranquilla, with a campus in Cúcuta, Colombia, subject to inspection and monitoring by Law 1740 of 2014 and Law 30 of 1992 of the Ministry of Education of Colombia. It has the institutional accreditation of High Quality granted by the Ministry of Education of Colombia, being the third institution of Barranquilla together with the North University and the Free University to receive this recognition.

The university was founded by an outstanding character from the Atlantic Coast called José Consuegra Higgins in 1972.

The institution has 20 undergraduate programs, 23 specializations, 17 master's degrees and 4 doctorates, for a total of 64 academic programs. It is one of the four universities, next to the North University, the University of Atlántico and the University of the Coast in offering doctoral programs.

== José Consuegra Higgins Theater ==
The university center has the José Consuegra Higgins Theater, a modern venue where special ceremonies, degrees, and other academic events are held. On November 7, 2008 it was inaugurated by former Colombian President Alvaro Uribe.

== Business Merit Award ==
The Business Merit Award is an important award given annually by Simon Bolivar University to all those entities or individuals that have contributed positively to business development. The award is supported by various Colombian entities such as the Mayor's Office and the Chamber of Commerce of Barranquilla, the Government of the Atlantic, the Colombian Institute of Technical Standards and Certification (ICONTEC) and other business associations.

== Academics ==
=== Undergraduate ===
- Business Administration
- Trade and international business
- Public accounting
- Technology in Port Logistics Management
- Port Operations
- Advertising and Marketing Processes
- Microbiology
- Straight
- Psychology
- Social work
- Surgical instrumentation
- Medicine
- Nursing
- Physiotherapy
- Systems engineer
- Industrial engineer
- Multimedia Engineering
- Mechanical Engineering
- Mechatronics Engineering
- Biomedical engineering

=== Postgraduate degrees ===
Specializations

- Security and health at work
- Cardiopulmonary and Vascular Rehabilitation
- Management and Innovation
- Taxation
- Government and Public Affairs
- Security Technology in Port Operations
- International Accounting Standards and Information Assurance
- Administrative law
- Labor law and social security
- Pedagogy of Sciences
- Software Engineering
- Operations Logistics
- Project Management
- Interactive multimedia
- Information Technology Management
- Critical Medicine and Intensive Care
- Neurology
- Internal Medicine
- Plastic, Reconstructive and Aesthetic Surgery
- Gynecology and Obstetrics
- Pediatrics
- Psychiatry
- Nephrology

Masters

- Computer and systems engineering
- Industrial engineer
- Business Administration and Innovation
- Audit in Quality Systems in Health Services
- Health Services Management
- Human Talent Management
- Development and Management of Social Enterprises
- Families
- Education
- Criminal law
- Procedural law
- Administrative law
- Psychology
- Genetics
- Physical activity and health
- Disability
- Neuropsychology

Specializations

- Administration
- Psychology
- Education Sciences
- Caribbean Society and Culture
