= Sabana Grande =

Sabana Grande (Spanish: Grand Plains) may refer to:

- Sabana Grande, Caracas, a district of Venezuela
- Sabana Grande, Puerto Rico, a municipality of Puerto Rico
- Sabana Grande de Boyá, a municipality in the Monte Plata province, Dominican Republic
- Sabana Grande de Palenque, a municipality in the San Cristóbal province, Dominican Republic
- Sabana Grande, Nicaragua, a municipality in the central region
- Sabanagrande, Honduras
- Sabanagrande, Atlántico in Colombia
- Sabanagrande, Herrera, Panama
- Sabanagrande, Los Santos, Panama
