= Juana de J. Sarmiento =

Colombian politician and activist (1899–1979)

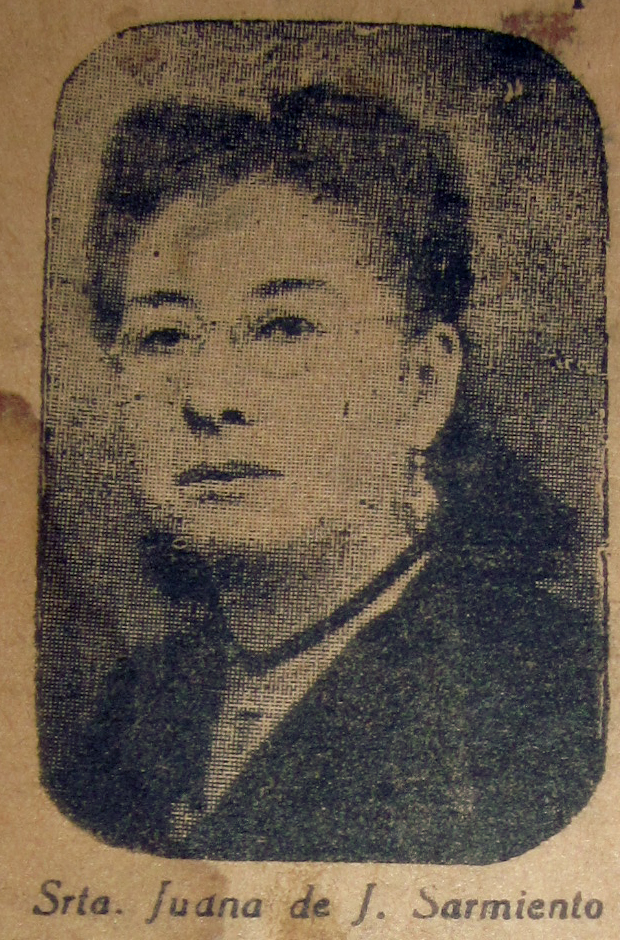
- Born: June 23, 1899; Sabanalarga, Colombia
- Died: May 25, 1979 (aged 79)

Mayor of Sabanalarga
- In office May 15, 1951 – October 20, 1951
- Succeeded by: Narciso Esmeral

Juana de Jesús Sarmiento Ariza, better known as Juana de J. Sarmiento (1899–1979) was a Colombian politician and activist, who in 1951 became the first female mayor of a municipality in Colombia.

== Early life and political career ==
Sarmiento was born in the municipality of Sabanalarga, Atlántico Department, on June 23, 1899 to Liborio Sarmiento and Julia Ariza. She began her political career by participating in the creation and organization of civic committees in the municipality. In the 1930s, she founded a women's organization called Colombia Democrática, also becoming its president. The establishment of this committee led to the creation of foundations which were led exclusively by women in Colombia.

In 1935, she was one of the founders of the Sociedad de Mejoras Públicas de Sabanalarga. During the 1940s, she continued to lead activism campaigns for the benefit of Sabanalarga and the rights of women and the underprivileged. In this way, she became a notable and respected citizen in Sabanalarga, consolidating her political career. On May 15, 1951, Sarmiento was appointed interim mayor of Sabanalarga by governor Eduardo Carbonell Insignares, a position she held for five months. Sarmiento was the first female mayor in the entire history of Colombia, and her tenure was widely reported in the Colombian press; she received letters of congratulation from the president Laureano Gómez and from the bishop of Barranquilla.

In 1955, Sarmiento was appointed Secretary of the Administrative Council of Sabanalarga. In one of her last civic endeavors, she was instrumental in building a nursing home in the 1970s.

Sarmiento died on May 25, 1979, at the age of 79.
