= Puerto Colombia Light =

Lighthouse in Colombia

La Ventana de Sueños
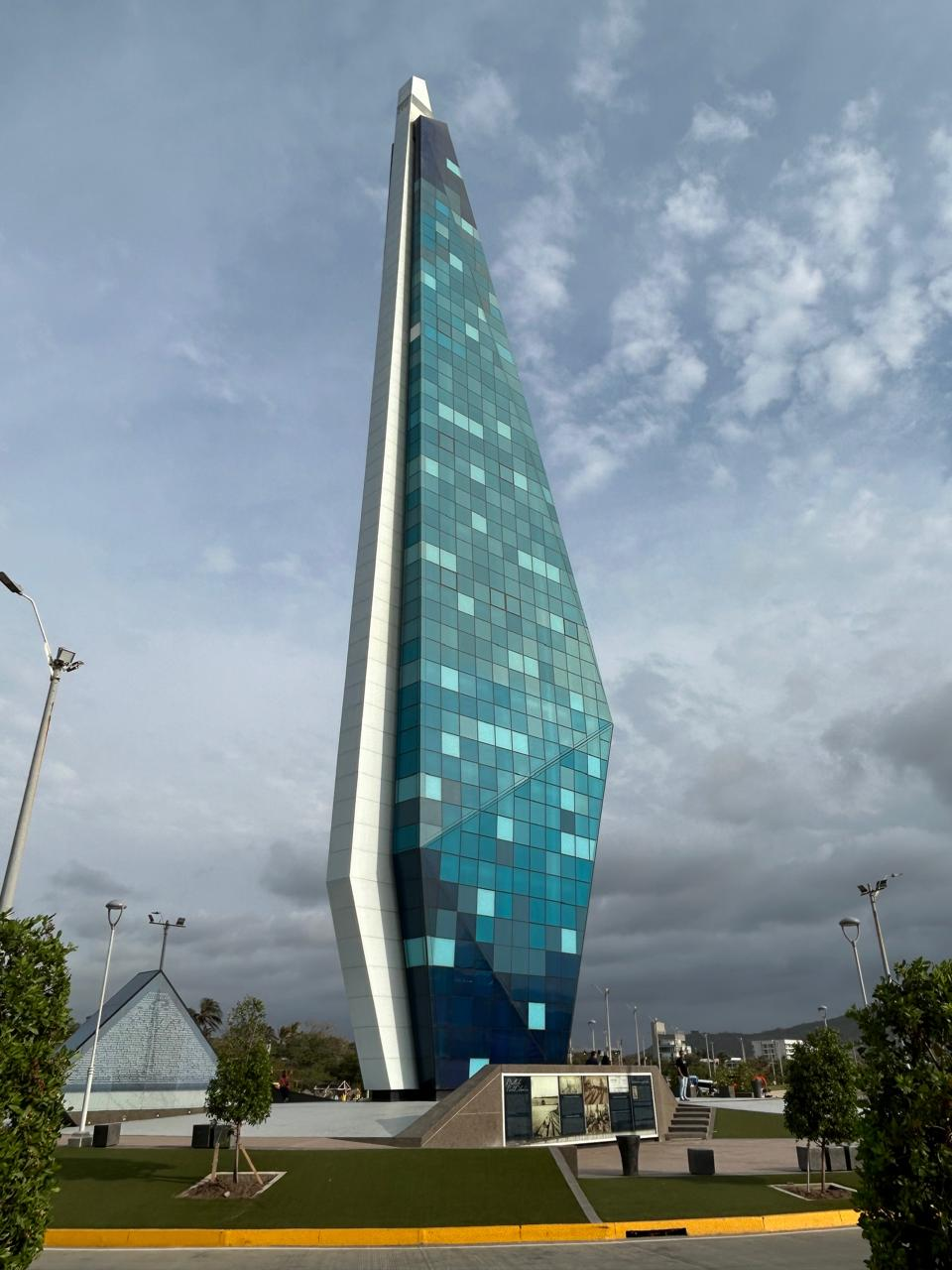
- Puerto Colombia Light, La Ventana de Sueños, 2023
- Location: Puerto Colombia, Atlántico Department, Colombia
- Coordinates: 11°00′05.3″N 74°57′10″W
- Constructed: 2023
- Construction: steel scaffold covered with aluminium and glass panels
- Height: 70 metres (230 ft)
- Shape: monument representing a sailing ship
- Markings: blue/green glass with variable color nighttime LED illumination

Light
- First lit: 2023
- Focal height: still unspecified
- Lens: still unspecified
- Light source: still unspecified
- Intensity: still unspecified
- Range: 20 nautical miles (37 km; 23 mi)
- Colombia no.: still unspecified

The Puerto Colombia Light, also known as The Window of Dreams (La Ventana de Sueños) is a lighthouse and monument located in Puerto Colombia, Atlántico Department, Colombia. Its construction began in March 2023 in a roundabout near Miramar beach, and was inaugurated within the year, on December 18. Besides being a navigational aid for ships cruising along the Caribbean coast between the nearby port of Barranquilla and Cartagena, it is also a monument dedicated to the many immigrants who entered the country through the port of Puerto Colombia and brought to the country knowledge and technological advances. This is a town that was founded in the mid-1800s and flourished with that important commercial activity until the 1940s, when a new port was built closer to Barranquilla and that of Puerto Colombia was abandoned.

== Characteristics ==
Internally constructed as a frame of hot-dip galvanized steel weighting 120 tons, the building is 70 metres (230 ft) high. Erected on sandy soil, it required foundations using 56 micropiles of a diameter of 20 centimetres (7.9 in) and 18 metres (59 ft) long, 158 cubic metres (5,600 cu ft) of structural concrete and 38 tons of structural steel.

The covering consists of 25 tons of aluminium and 1,940 square metres (20,900 sq ft) of laminated and toughened glass panels, tainted in variable blue/green shades reminiscent of the colors of the nearby Caribbean sea. Additionally, solar panels are used in the covering to power variable color nighttime LED illumination embedded in the glass panels.

The lighthouse light has a range of 20 nautical miles (37 km; 23 mi), and an autonomous photovoltaic energy system. More than 20,000 stainless steel screws were used to fix and anchor the glass.

Since its completion, the Puerto Colombia Light has been the tallest lighthouse in South America.

== History ==
The monument was built at the initiative of Barranquilla businessman Christian Daes through his company Tecnoglass as a tribute to the foreign immigrants who arrived in the country through Puerto Colombia, among them his father, José Daes.

== Image gallery ==
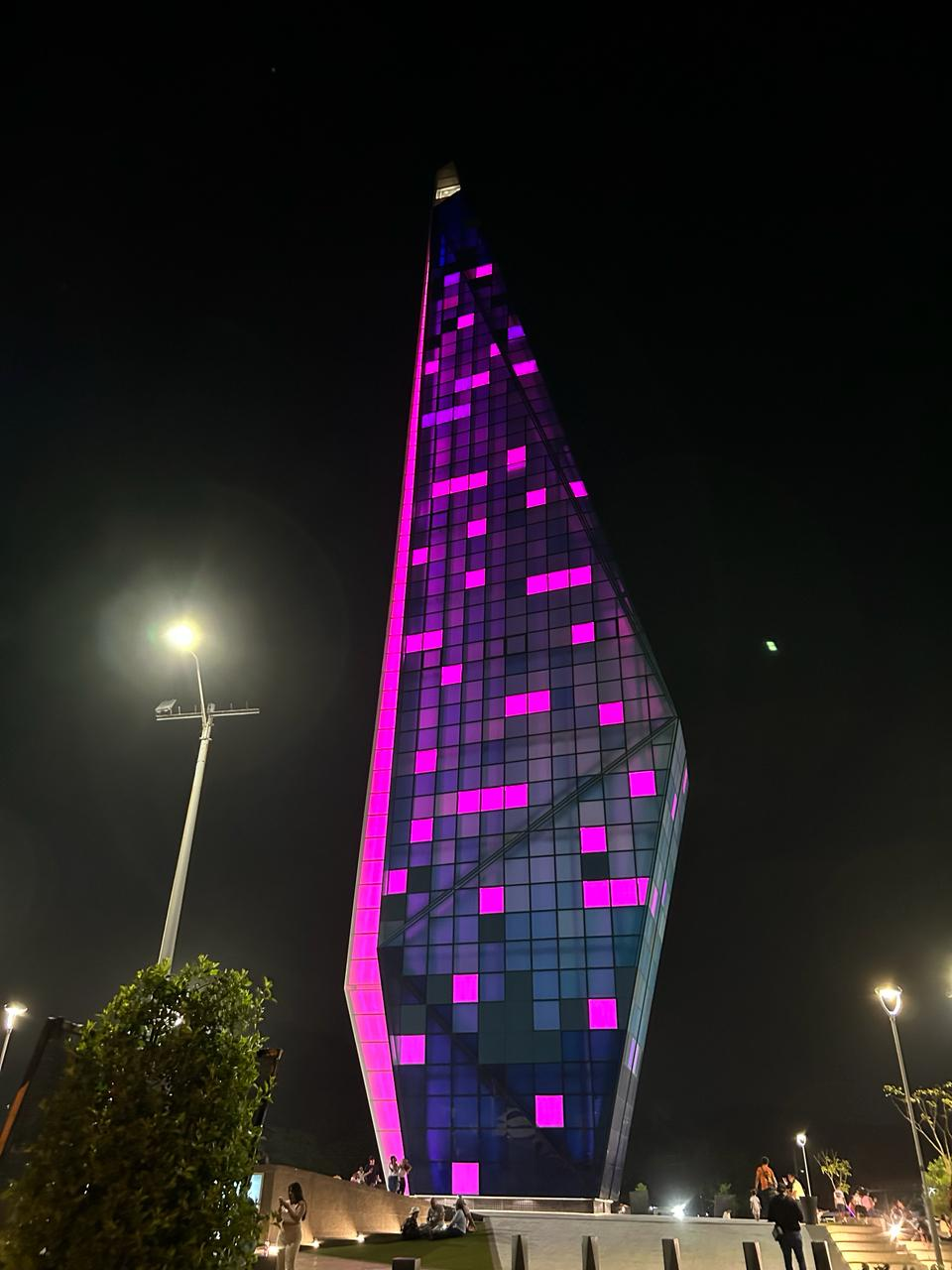
Puerto Colombia Light at night

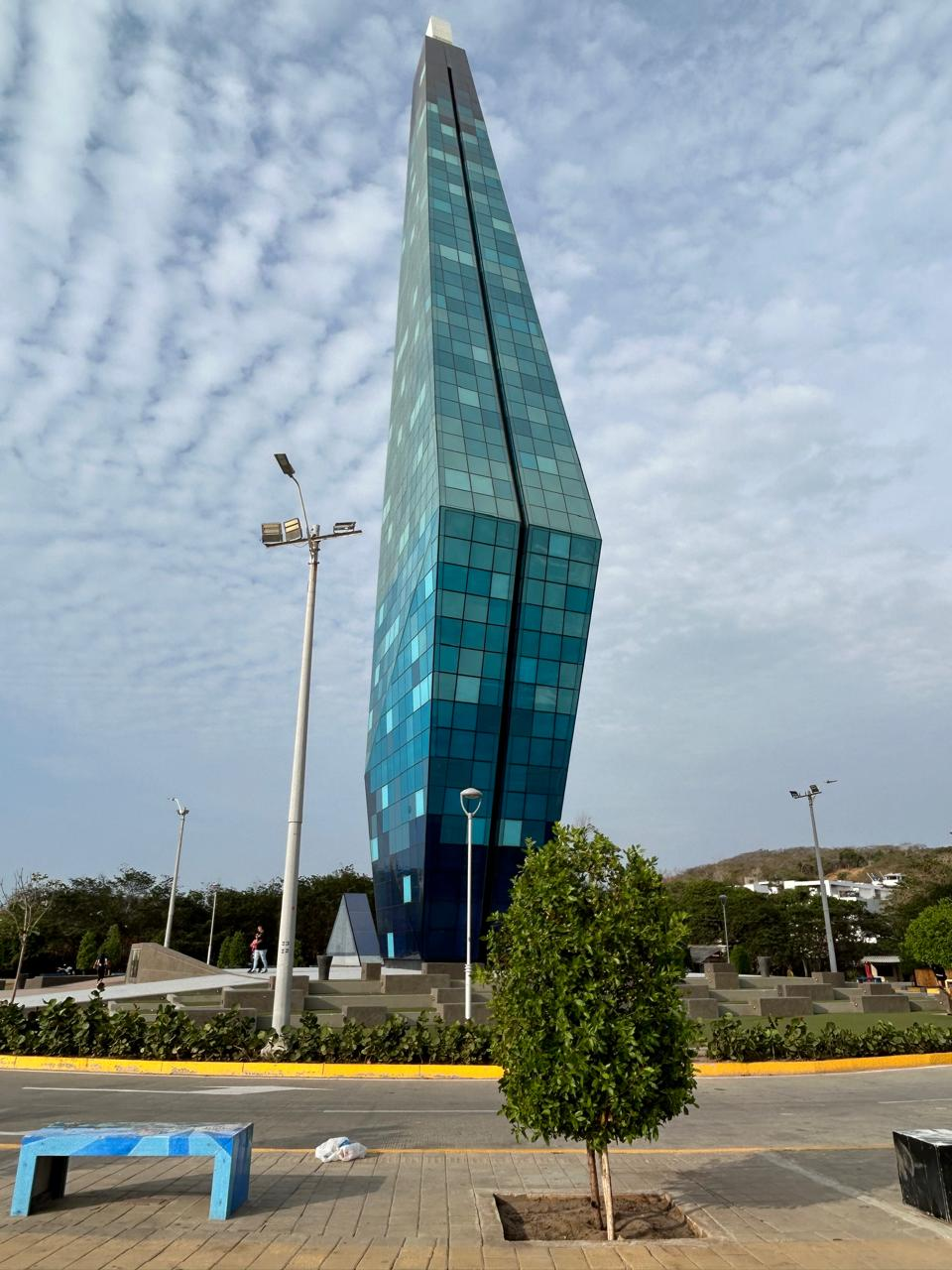
Puerto Colombia Light, view from the south-west

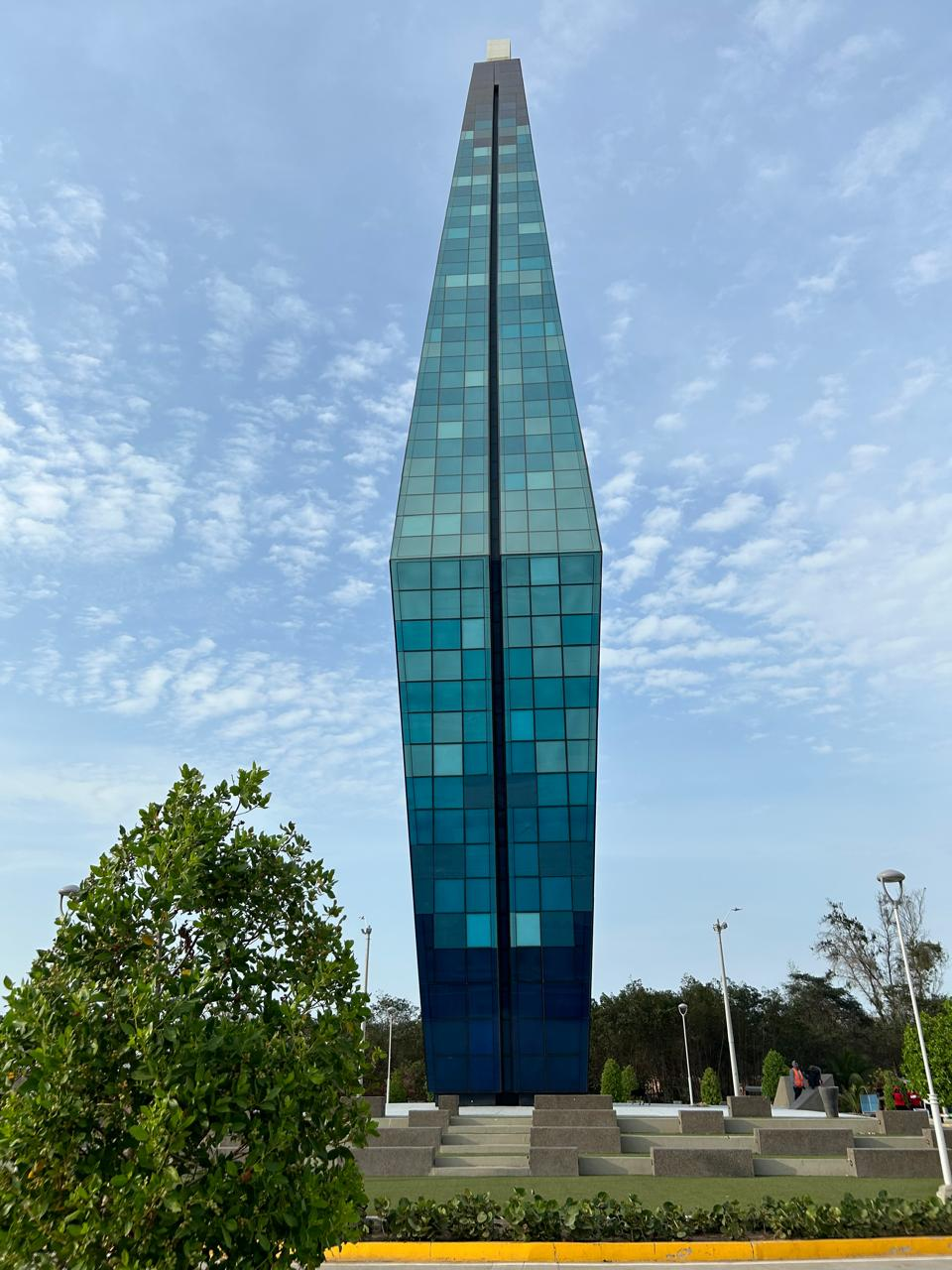
Puerto Colombia Light, view from the south

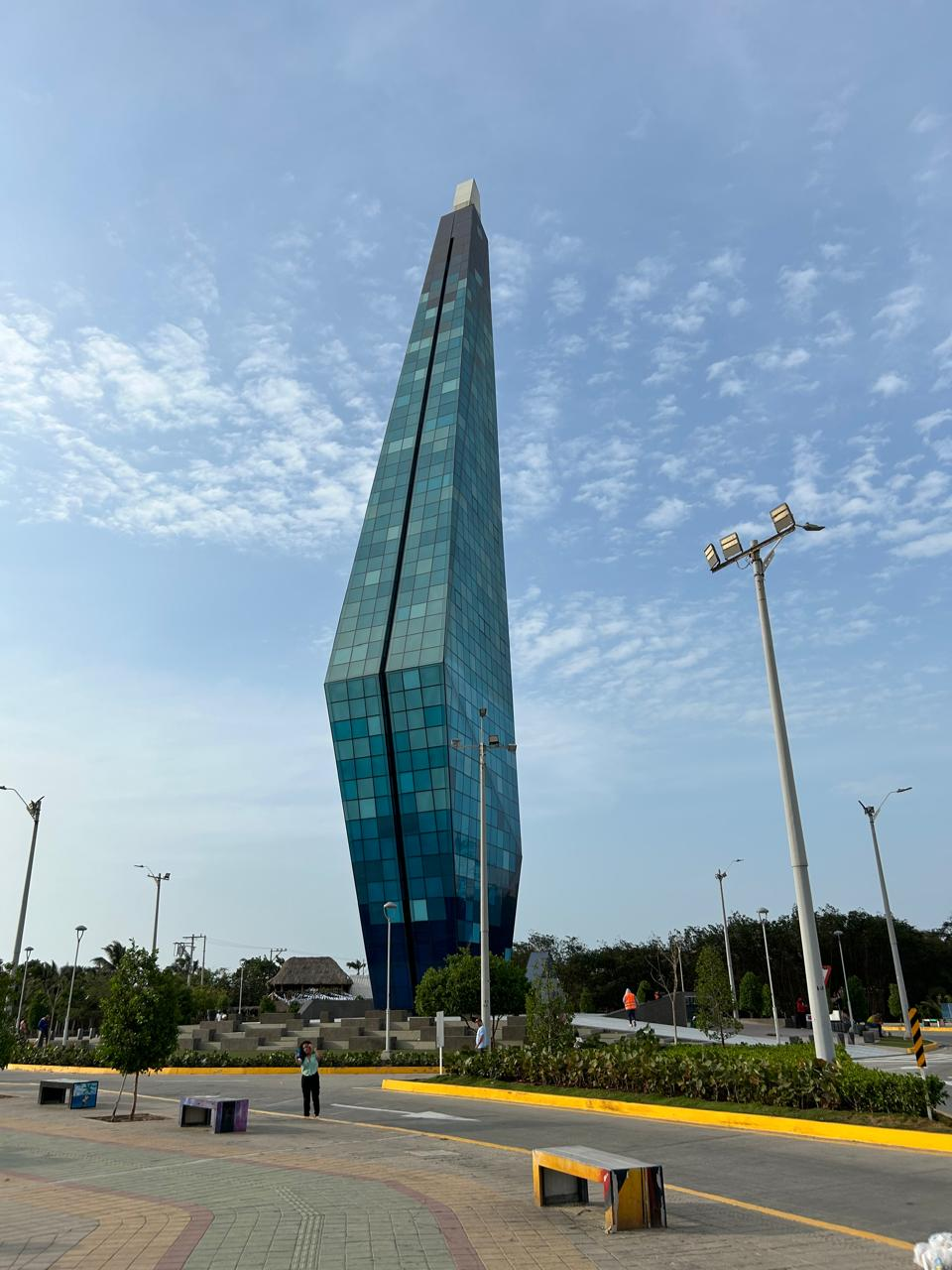
Puerto Colombia Light, view from the south-east
