= Soledad, Atlántico =

Soledad
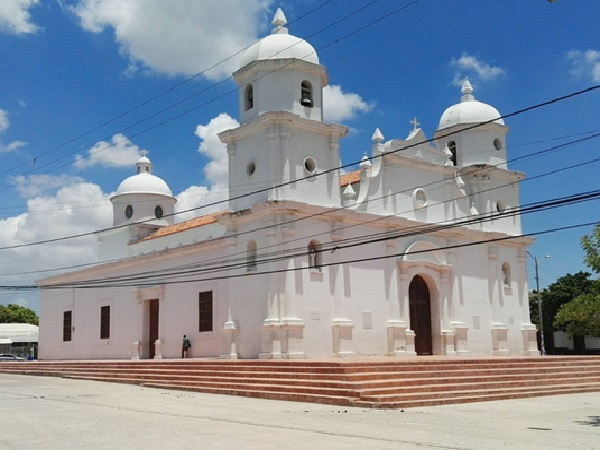
- St. Anthony of Padua temple

- Flag Coat of arms

- Location of the municipality and town of Soledad in the Department of Atlántico.

- Location in Colombia
- Coordinates: 10°55′N 74°45′W
- Country: Colombia
- Region: Caribbean
- Department: Atlántico
- Founded: 1598

Government
  - Mayor: Rodolfo Ucrós

Area
  - Total: 67 km^{2} (26 sq mi)
- Elevation: 5 m (16 ft)

Population (2019 estimate)
  - Total: 683,486
  - Density: 10,000/km^{2} (26,000/sq mi)
- Demonym: Soledeño
- Time zone: UTC-5
- Area code: 57 + 5
- Website: Official website (in Spanish)

Soledad (Spanish pronunciation: [soleˈðað]) is a municipality in the Colombian department of Atlántico, part of the Metropolitan area of Barranquilla. It is the 6th most populous in Colombia and 3rd most populous in the Caribbean region, after Barranquilla and Cartagena. It is also the city with the highest population growth in Colombia and in 2005 was home to 455,734 and in 2019 to 683,486. On October 29, 2023, Alcira Sandoval Ibañez was elected by popular vote as the new mayor of Soledad.

== Borders ==
Bordered on the north by the special district of Barranquilla, where the boundary is the Arroyo Don Juan, on the south by Malambo, on the east with the Department of Magdalena, separated by the Magdalena River, and on the west by Galapa.

== Geography ==
Physical Description: The location of the municipality of Soledad in relation to geographical coordinates is as follows: 10°55'N and 74°46'W.

== Transportation ==
- Ernesto Cortissoz International Airport

== Climate ==
Climate data for Soledad, elevation 14 m (46 ft), (1991–2020)
Month	Jan	Feb	Mar	Apr	May	Jun	Jul	Aug	Sep	Oct	Nov	Dec	Year
Mean daily maximum °C (°F)	31.6 (88.9)	31.8 (89.2)	32.4 (90.3)	33.4 (92.1)	33.5 (92.3)	33.3 (91.9)	33.1 (91.6)	33.5 (92.3)	33.3 (91.9)	32.8 (91.0)	32.4 (90.3)	32.1 (89.8)	32.8 (91.0)
Daily mean °C (°F)	28.5 (83.3)	28.7 (83.7)	29.1 (84.4)	29.9 (85.8)	30.0 (86.0)	29.9 (85.8)	29.8 (85.6)	29.9 (85.8)	29.7 (85.5)	29.1 (84.4)	29.1 (84.4)	29.0 (84.2)	29.4 (84.9)
Mean daily minimum °C (°F)	23.8 (74.8)	24.1 (75.4)	24.4 (75.9)	25.0 (77.0)	25.1 (77.2)	25.0 (77.0)	24.8 (76.6)	24.8 (76.6)	24.3 (75.7)	24.1 (75.4)	24.3 (75.7)	24.4 (75.9)	24.5 (76.1)
Average precipitation mm (inches)	1.4 (0.06)	1.8 (0.07)	1.5 (0.06)	28.9 (1.14)	127.0 (5.00)	87.5 (3.44)	87.7 (3.45)	107.0 (4.21)	173.5 (6.83)	159.1 (6.26)	114.9 (4.52)	30.2 (1.19)	920.5 (36.24)
Average precipitation days (≥ 1.0 mm)	0.2	0.1	0.4	2.6	7.2	6.6	5.7	7.7	10.5	11.3	7.3	1.6	61.1
Average relative humidity (%)	79	78	77	79	81	82	81	82	84	86	84	81	81
Mean monthly sunshine hours	285.2	248.4	244.9	210.0	189.1	201.0	217.0	207.7	171.0	167.4	186.0	244.9	2,572.6
Mean daily sunshine hours	9.2	8.8	7.9	7.0	6.1	6.7	7.0	6.7	5.7	5.4	6.2	7.9	7.1
Source: Instituto de Hidrologia Meteorologia y Estudios Ambientales (humidity, sun 1971-2010)

== Sources ==
- (in Spanish) Gobernacion del Atlantico - Soledad
