= Metropolitan area of Barranquilla =

Coordinates: 10°57′50″N 74°47′47″W

Barranquilla metropolitan area
- Metropolitan area
- Country: Colombia
- Department: Atlántico
- Seat: Barranquilla
- Municipalities: Barranquilla; Soledad; Malambo; Puerto Colombia; Galapa

The Barranquilla metropolitan area (Spanish: Área metropolitana de Barranquilla) is a metropolitan area in Atlántico, Colombia, centered on the city of Barranquilla.

The city of Barranquilla serves as a major trade center for Colombia, housing the largest port in the country. With an estimated population of 1.2 million, every major company in the country keeps at least one major depot or distribution center in the urban areas, and most international brands utilize the port while having their logistic operating bases in the region.

Due to rapid growth, the region has undergone a series of successive projects intended to harmonize the city and the smaller towns that form its commuter belt, such as the creation of regional lines in the TransMetro of Barranquilla, the bus rapid transit system of the city, to allow for faster commute times.

Local celebrities and personalities have included Sofia Vergara, Shakira, Paulina Vega, Nina Garcia, and Carmen Villalobos.

Urbanization has become a vital part of the city's economy. This conurbation has grown significantly as a direct result of this and led the region to emerge as a metropolitan hub for the country's Atlantic coast.

The region as a whole is overseen by a regional director.

== Sports ==
=== Professional ===
The Barranquilla metro area is home to the following major league professional sports teams:

- The Junior of the Categoría Primera A play at Estadio Metropolitano Roberto Meléndez in Barranquilla
- The Barranquilla of the Categoría Primera B play at Estadio Romelio Martínez in Barranquilla
- The Caimanes of the Colombian Professional Baseball League play at Estadio Édgar Rentería in Barranquilla
- The Titanes of the Colombian Professional Basketball League play at Arena Deportiva Elías Chegwin in Barranquilla
