= Manatí (disambiguation) =

Manatí is the Carib word which means breast or udder, referring to the Manatee, a sea mammal.

Manatí may also refer to:

== Places ==
- Manatí, Puerto Rico, a municipality in Puerto Rico
- Manatí, Atlántico, a municipality in Atlántico Department, Colombia
- Manatí, Cuba, a municipality in Las Tunas Province, Cuba
