= Juan de Acosta =

Coordinates: 10°50′N 75°02′W

- Municipality and town
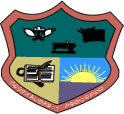
- Flag Coat of arms

- Location of the municipality and town of Juan de Acosta in the Department of Atlántico.
- Country: Colombia
- Region: Caribbean
- Department: Atlántico

Government
  - Mayor: Abelardo Padilla Blanco (Democratic Colombia Party)

Area
  - Total: 176 km^{2} (68 sq mi)

Population (Census 2018)
  - Total: 18,828
  - Density: 107/km^{2} (277/sq mi)
- Time zone: UTC-5 (Colombia Standard Time)
- Website: www.juandeacosta-atlantico.gov.co/sitio.shtml

Juan de Acosta is a municipality and town in the Colombian department of Atlántico.

== Climate ==
Climate data for Juan de Acosta, elevation 20 m (66 ft), (1981–2010)
Month	Jan	Feb	Mar	Apr	May	Jun	Jul	Aug	Sep	Oct	Nov	Dec	Year
Mean daily maximum °C (°F)	32.3 (90.1)	32.8 (91.0)	33.2 (91.8)	33.4 (92.1)	32.8 (91.0)	32.6 (90.7)	32.7 (90.9)	32.8 (91.0)	32.2 (90.0)	31.8 (89.2)	31.7 (89.1)	32.1 (89.8)	32.5 (90.5)
Daily mean °C (°F)	27.4 (81.3)	27.5 (81.5)	27.7 (81.9)	28.2 (82.8)	28.2 (82.8)	28.1 (82.6)	28.1 (82.6)	28.2 (82.8)	27.8 (82.0)	27.6 (81.7)	27.6 (81.7)	27.5 (81.5)	27.8 (82.0)
Mean daily minimum °C (°F)	23.1 (73.6)	23.4 (74.1)	24.1 (75.4)	25.0 (77.0)	25.0 (77.0)	24.5 (76.1)	24.4 (75.9)	24.5 (76.1)	24.1 (75.4)	23.8 (74.8)	23.7 (74.7)	23.3 (73.9)	24.0 (75.2)
Average precipitation mm (inches)	0.9 (0.04)	0.7 (0.03)	1.6 (0.06)	39.4 (1.55)	92.1 (3.63)	125.4 (4.94)	107.6 (4.24)	132.4 (5.21)	167.4 (6.59)	195.5 (7.70)	130.3 (5.13)	34.3 (1.35)	1,011.9 (39.84)
Average precipitation days (≥ 1.0 mm)	0	0	1	5	11	11	10	12	14	14	10	3	86
Average relative humidity (%)	80	79	79	79	82	83	82	83	85	86	85	81	82
Source: Instituto de Hidrologia Meteorologia y Estudios Ambientales
