= Bocas de Ceniza =

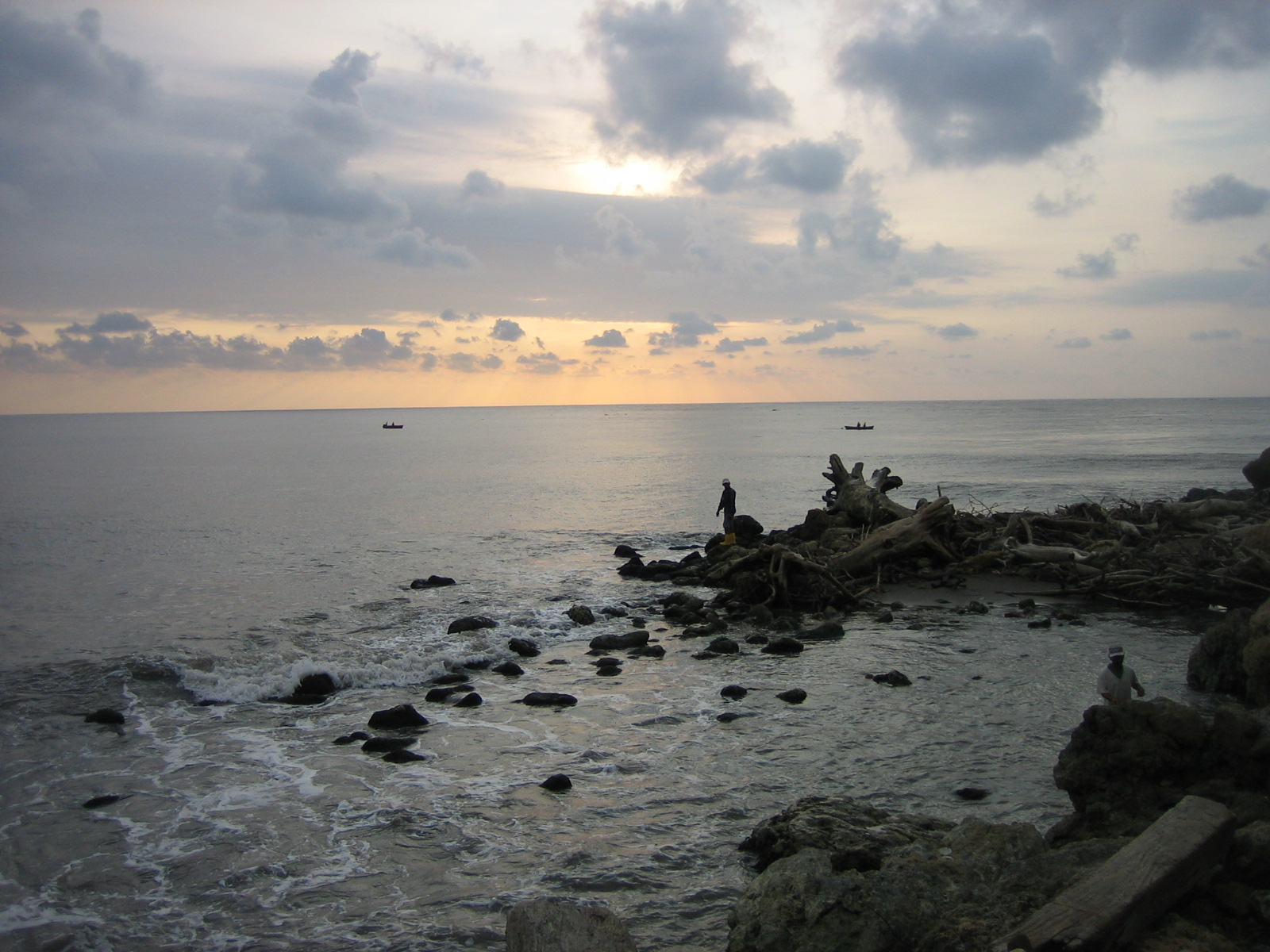
Sunset in Bocas de Ceniza.

Bocas de Ceniza (Spanish for: Ash Mouths) is the mouth of the Magdalena River in the Caribbean Sea. It owes its name to the dusky color ocean waters take to receive the river. At present, the river flows into the sea through an artificial canal built in the 1930s.

== History ==
Bocas de Ceniza was discovered by Rodrigo de Bastidas on 1 April 1501. In 1824 the river navigation steamships began, raising local interest in the use of Bocas de Ceniza. The railway construction between Barranquilla and Puerto Colombia in 1872 and the transfer of Aduana Nacional to Barranquilla increased the desire to enable the sector of Bocas de Ceniza for international maritime trade.
