= Santo Tomás, Atlántico =

Santo Tomás
- Municipality and town
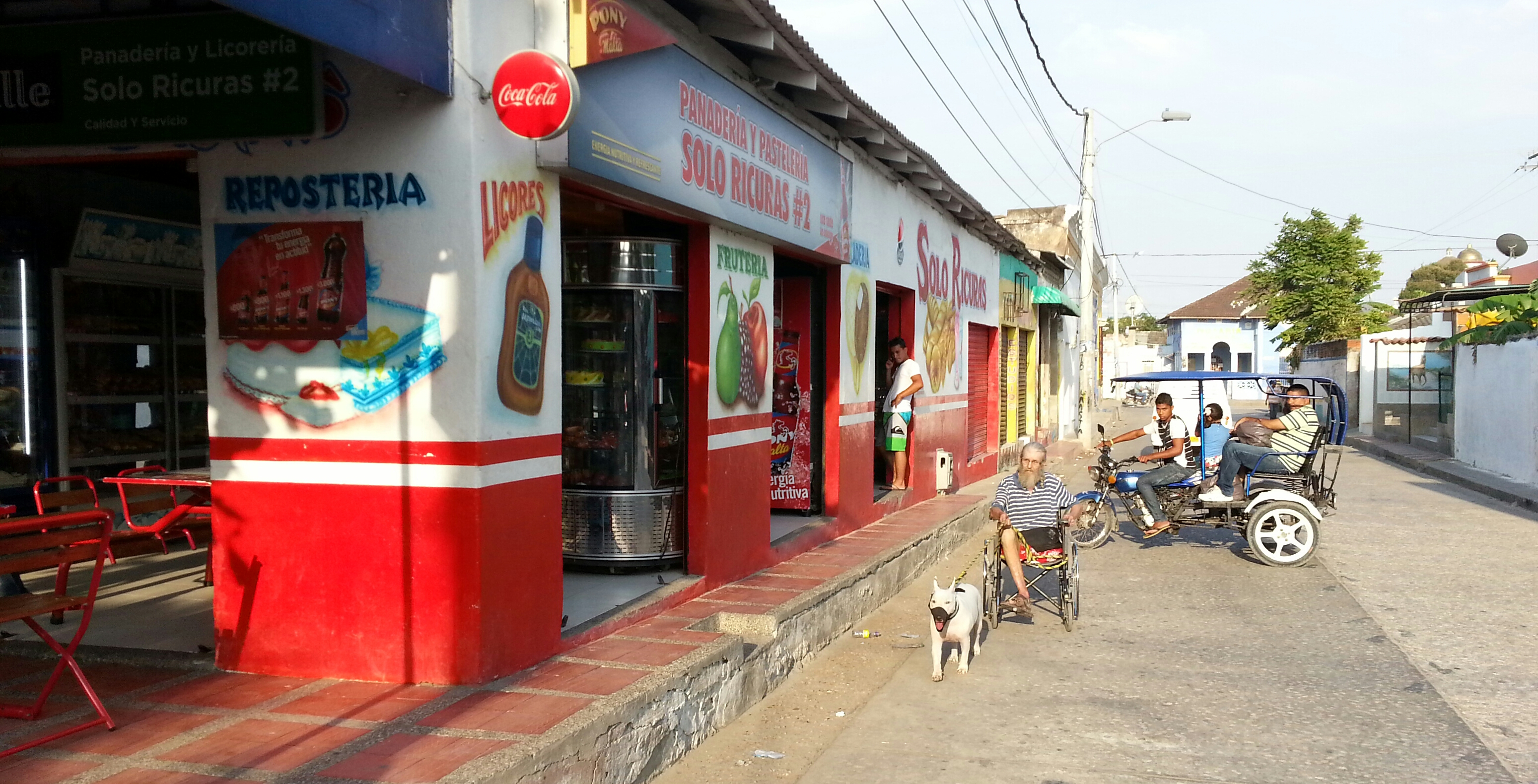

- Flag Seal

- Location of the municipality and town of Santo Tomás, Atlantico in the Atlántico Department of Colombia

- Location in Colombia
- Coordinates: 10°46′N 74°55′W
- Country: Colombia
- Department: Atlántico Department

Government
  - Mayor: Luis Alberto Escorcia Castro (Radical Change)

Area
  - Municipality and town: 65 km^{2} (25 sq mi)
  - Urban: 3.32 km^{2} (1.28 sq mi)

Population (2018 census)
  - Municipality and town: 32,000
  - Density: 490/km^{2} (1,300/sq mi)
  - Urban: 30,211
  - Urban density: 9,100/km^{2} (23,600/sq mi)
- Time zone: UTC-5 (Colombia Standard Time)
- Website: www.santotomas-atlantico.gov.co/sitio.shtml

Santo Tomás is a municipality and town in the Colombian department of Atlántico.

== Notable people ==
- Luis Muriel (born 1991) – footballer who represented the Colombia national team
