= Santa Lucía, Atlántico =

Coordinates: 10°19′N 74°57′W

Santa Lucía
- Municipality and town
- Santa Lucía
- Flag Coat of arms

- Location of the municipality and town of Santa Lucía in the Department of Atlántico.
- Country: Colombia
- Region: Caribbean
- Department: Atlántico

Government
  - Alcalde: Rehussen Martinez Diaz (Partido Conservador Colombiano)

Area
  - Total: 50 km^{2} (19 sq mi)

Population (Census 2018)
  - Total: 12,650
  - Density: 250/km^{2} (660/sq mi)
- Time zone: UTC-5 (Colombia Standard Time)
- Website: www.santalucia-atlantico.gov.co/sitio.shtml

Santa Lucía (Spanish pronunciation: [ˈsanta luˈsi.a]) is a municipality and town in the Colombian department of Atlántico. The town is located on the north bank of the Dique Canal.

== Climate ==
Climate data for Santa Lucía (Sta Lucia Gja), elevation 5 m (16 ft), (1971–2000)
Month	Jan	Feb	Mar	Apr	May	Jun	Jul	Aug	Sep	Oct	Nov	Dec	Year
Mean daily maximum °C (°F)	34.8 (94.6)	35.5 (95.9)	36.0 (96.8)	34.9 (94.8)	33.6 (92.5)	33.6 (92.5)	34.4 (93.9)	33.9 (93.0)	33.2 (91.8)	32.7 (90.9)	33.0 (91.4)	34.1 (93.4)	34.1 (93.4)
Daily mean °C (°F)	28.4 (83.1)	28.7 (83.7)	29.1 (84.4)	28.8 (83.8)	28.3 (82.9)	28.2 (82.8)	28.4 (83.1)	28.1 (82.6)	27.6 (81.7)	27.3 (81.1)	27.6 (81.7)	27.9 (82.2)	28.2 (82.8)
Mean daily minimum °C (°F)	21.7 (71.1)	22.1 (71.8)	22.8 (73.0)	23.5 (74.3)	24.1 (75.4)	23.9 (75.0)	23.1 (73.6)	23.3 (73.9)	23.4 (74.1)	23.3 (73.9)	23.1 (73.6)	22.4 (72.3)	23.1 (73.6)
Average precipitation mm (inches)	7.7 (0.30)	12.2 (0.48)	23.0 (0.91)	76.7 (3.02)	144.3 (5.68)	117.2 (4.61)	87.1 (3.43)	116.2 (4.57)	122.6 (4.83)	167.2 (6.58)	76.0 (2.99)	30.7 (1.21)	980.9 (38.62)
Average precipitation days	1	1	2	8	13	11	10	12	13	13	10	4	99
Source: Instituto de Hidrologia Meteorologia y Estudios Ambientales
