= Homer Martínez =

Colombian footballer (born 1997)

Personal information
- Full name: Homer Enrique Martínez Yepez
- Date of birth: 6 October 1997 (age 29)
- Place of birth: Malambo, Colombia
- Height: 1.85 m (6 ft 1 in)
- Positions: Defensive midfielder; centre-back

Team information
- Current team: Deportes Tolima (on loan from Juárez)
- Number: 14

Youth career
- Independiente Medellín
- Barranquilla

Senior career*
Years	Team	Apps	(Gls)
2016	Junior	0	(0)
2017–2018	Barranquilla	54	(5)
2019	Junior	7	(0)
2019	Barranquilla	10	(0)
2020	Atlético Bucaramanga	20	(0)
2021–2024	Junior	100	(2)
2024–2025	Independiente Medellín	30	(1)
2025–	Juárez	18	(0)
2026–	→ Deportes Tolima (loan)	0	(0)

International career^{‡}
2022–	Colombia	1	(0)
- * Club domestic league appearances and goals as of 20:09, 13 December 2025 (UTC) ‡ National team caps and goals as of 11:52, 19 January 2022 (UTC)

Homer Enrique Martínez Yepez (born 6 October 1997) is a Colombian footballer who plays as a defensive midfielder for Liga DIMAYOR club Deportes Tolima, on loan from Liga MX club Juárez.

== Career ==
=== Club career ===
In 2016, Martínez had a spell at Atlético Junior. However, he only reached one game with the first team as an unused substitute, before he returned to Barranquilla. He became a regular player at Barranquilla in the 2017 and 2018 seasons in Categoría Primera B. Due to his good performances, he was invited to a two-week trial by Mexican club C.F. Pachuca in November 2018. However, he returned to Barranquilla without a contract.

After a trial period in January 2019, he returned to Atlético Junior, signing a one-year deal in February 2019. In the summer 2019, he was close to join Rionegro Águilas on loan, but no agreement was finally reached and he then once again returned to Barranquilla. In September 2019 it was also reported, that Cypriot club, Pafos FC, had presented an offer for him.

On 13 January 2020 it was confirmed, that Martínez had joined Atlético Bucaramanga for the 2020 season. At the end of 2020, Martínez signed a deal with his former club Atlético Junior for the 2021 season.

On 18 July 2024, Homer Martínez joined Independiente Medellín, the club he played for as a youth, where he signed a three-year contract.

== International career ==
Martínez made his debut for the Colombia national team on 16 January 2022 in a 2–1 home win over Honduras.
