= Puerto Colombia =

Coordinates: 11°01′N 74°53′W

- Municipality and town
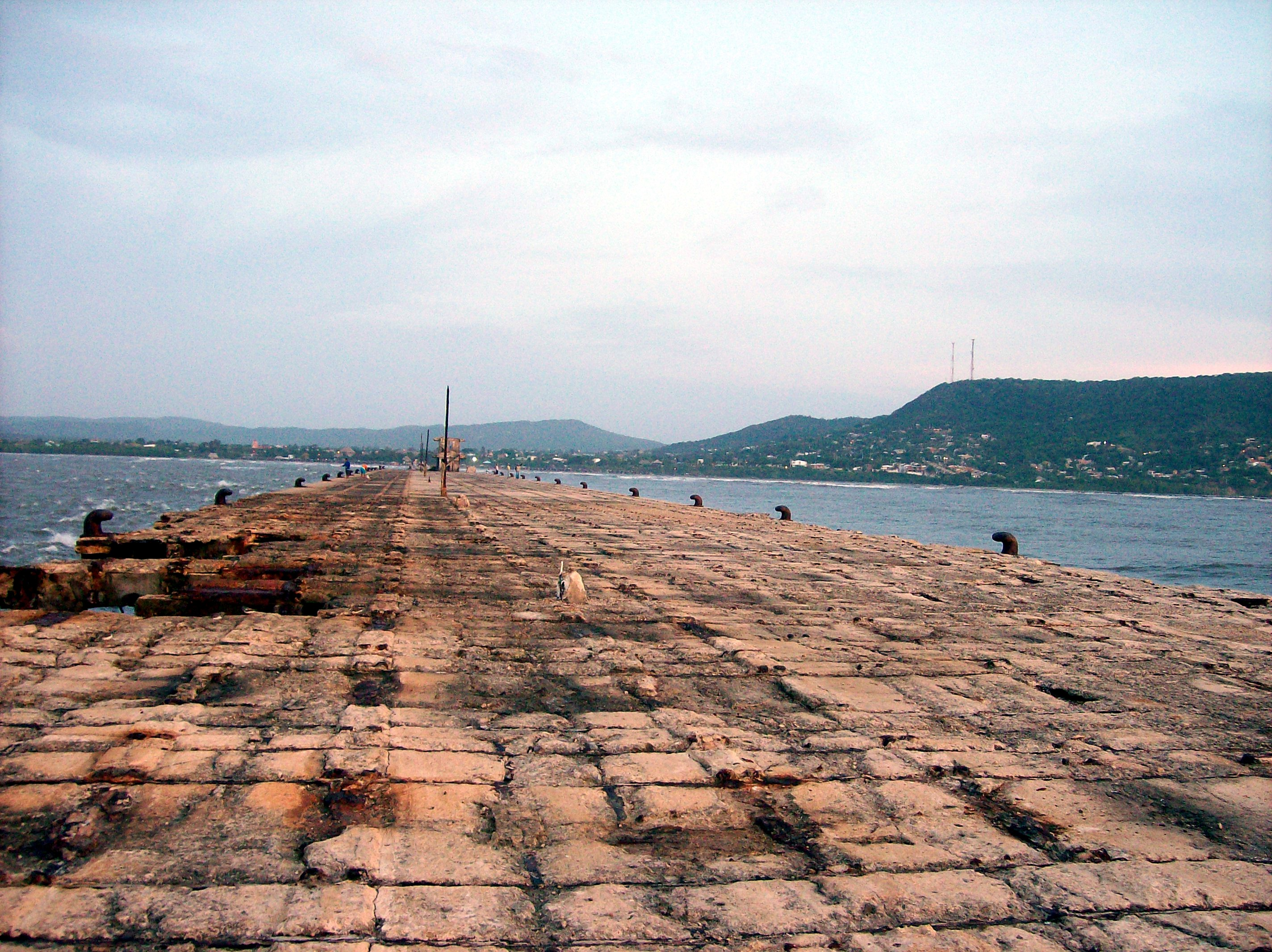
- Puerto Colombia

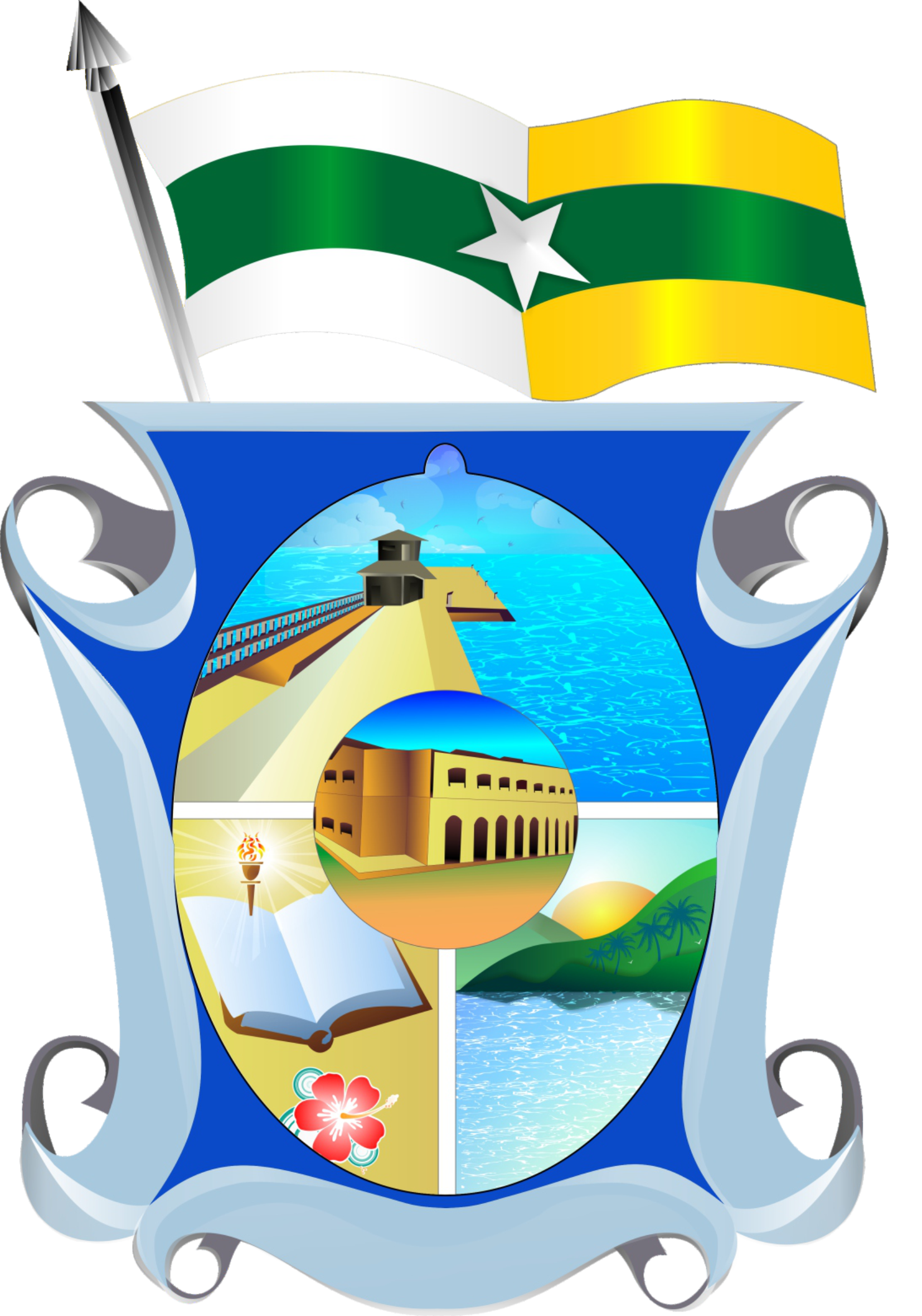
- Flag Coat of arms
- Nickname: Puerto
- Location of the municipality and town of Puerto Colombia in the northern part of the Atlántico Department of Colombia
- Country: Colombia
- Region: Caribbean
- Department: Atlántico

Government
  - Mayor: Plinio Cedeño (2023-2026)

Area
  - Municipality and town: 70.57 km^{2} (27.25 sq mi)
  - Urban: 13.83 km^{2} (5.34 sq mi)

Population (2018 census)
  - Municipality and town: 49,264
  - Density: 698.1/km^{2} (1,808/sq mi)
  - Urban: 42,803
  - Urban density: 3,095/km^{2} (8,016/sq mi)
- Time zone: UTC-5 (Colombia Standard Time)
- Website: www.puertocolombia-atlantico.gov.co/sitio.shtml

Puerto Colombia is a coastal town and municipality in Atlántico Department, Colombia founded in the mid-1800s. It is famous for its "Pier of Puerto Colombia", that at one time was the largest pier in the world. Duties were later transferred to the larger and modern Port of Barranquilla in Bocas de Cenizas, the mouth of the Magdalena River in the Caribbean Sea.

The town enjoyed a glorious post-colonial period as the main port on the Caribbean coast of Colombia, where most European and Middle Easterns immigrants entered the country. In the second half of the 20th century, Puerto Colombia faced a rapid decline, eclipsed by Barranquilla, the capital of Atlántico.

Thanks to recent free trade agreements with Canada, the United States of America and many European countries, the municipality has been included in Barranquilla's metropolitan area and its port has undergone large-scale redevelopment. The focus of important public-private partnerships, Puerto Colombia is expected to regain its prominent role as the main sea port of Colombia within a decade.

Carlos Altahona, Puerto Colombia's Past Mayor, was recognized in December 2012 as the best municipal leader in Colombia for his efforts to eradicate extreme poverty.

La Ventana de Sueños, Puerto Colombia Light completed in December 2023, is the tallest lighthouse in South America.
