= Baranoa =

- Municipality
- Flag Coat of arms

- Location of the city of Baranoa in the Department of Atlántico.

- Location within Colombia
- Coordinates: 10°48′N 74°55′W
- Country: Colombia
- Region: Caribbean
- Department: Atlántico
- Founded: 1543

Government
  - Mayor: Roberto Celedón Venegas 2020 - 2023

Area
  - Municipality: 121.3 km^{2} (46.8 sq mi)
  - Urban: 5.22 km^{2} (2.02 sq mi)
- Elevation: 118 m (387 ft)

Population (2018 census)
  - Municipality: 68,383
  - Density: 563.8/km^{2} (1,460/sq mi)
  - Urban: 51,730
  - Urban density: 9,910/km^{2} (25,700/sq mi)
- Demonym: Baranoero
- Time zone: UTC-5
- Area code: 57 + 5
- Website: Official website (in Spanish)

Baranoa is a municipality and city in the Colombian department of Atlántico and widely known for being the birth city of the very first documented black president of Colombia, Juan José Nieto Gil. Its geographical location has historically led to the coining of the name "El corazón alegre del Atlántico", ("The happy heart of the Atlantic" in English), since it is located almost exactly in the center of the department.

== Geography ==
The municipality occupies an area of 121.3 km^{2}, including rural, urban, suburban and protected land.

Baranoa is irrigated by several creeks including Santa Rosa, Campeche, Big Creek and Deep Creek.

== Demographics ==
Baranoa has a population of 62,382 (2018 census). 82.63% of these are concentrated in the urban area and 17.37% in rural areas.

== History ==
Baranoa was an indigenous settlement located close to Big Creek (Arroyo Grande) when the Spanish conquered it under the command of Don Pedro de Heredia in 1534.

In October 1543, it was commended by the Spanish Crown to Hernando Dávila. Further commendations were given to Inés de Mendoza (1556), Hernando De la Salas (1568) and José De las Salas (1609). Viceroy Sebastian de Eslava ordered a reformation of the town in 1744 and 1745. As a consequence, 39 Spanish families made their home there, creating the Parish of Santa Ana of Baranoa.

On 23 October 1856, the municipality of Baranoa was created, based on the number of inhabitants and development level. The municipality category, as well as its boundaries, was ratified on 16 December 1964.

== Economy ==
Economic activities are focused on cattle raising, corn, cassava, cotton and Jocote plum farming. A Plum Festival takes place in northern Colombia. Calcite and iron minerals are mined.
