= Silvia Tcherassi =

Colombian fashion designer (born 1965)

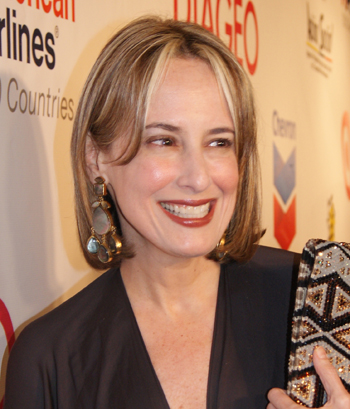
- Tcherassi in 2011
- Born: Silvia Eugenia Tcherassi Solano; August 21, 1965 (age 60); Barranquilla, Atlantico, Colombia
- Education: Parsons School of Design
- Occupation: Fashion designer
- Label: Silvia Tcherassi Inc.
- Spouse: Maurucio Espinosa
- Children: Mauricio; Sofía

Silvia Tcherassi (born 21 August 1964) is a Colombian fashion designer, born in Barranquilla, Atlantico, Colombia.

== Personal life and education ==
Silvia Tcherassi was born on August 21, 1965, in Barranquilla, Colombia. She started her artistic career as an interior designer and transitioned to fashion design. Tcherassi is married to Mauricio Espinosa and had two children, Sofia and Mauricio. Her daughter followed her mother steps and studies in Parsons School of Design. Her atelier is located in Miami, Florida.

== Career ==
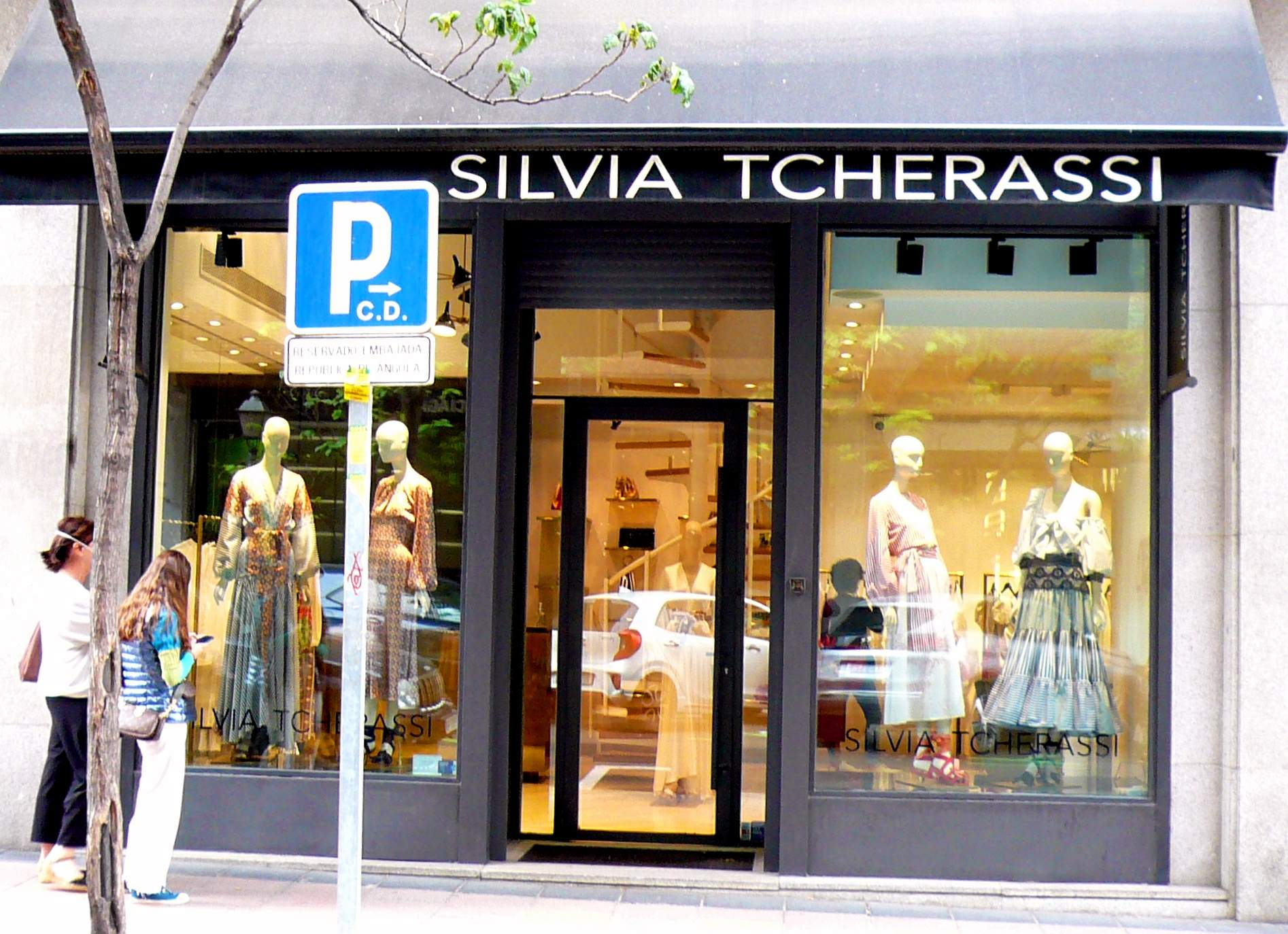
A Silvia Tcherassi shop in Madrid, Spain

Tcherassi has been described as "revolutionizing the Latin American fashion scene in a definitive way." Elle has described her dresses as "tempting". She once said, "My creations are absolutely designed to serve a woman, from 18 to 50 years old." Silvia Tcherassi has boutiques in the United States, Spain and Colombia. Her clothes can be found at Saks Fifth Avenue and other fine stores. Her collections have been showcased on the catwalks of Milan Fashion Week and Paris Fashion week.

Her prêt-à-porter anticipated the concept of demi-couture. One of her pieces was included at the "Unbridaled: The Marriage of Tradition and Avant Garde" exhibition in Paris. She was named a chevalier (knight) of the French government's Ordre des Arts et des Lettres. Tcherassi is the author of the bestseller Elegancia Sin Esfuerzo (Effortless Elegance) published by Random House.

== Tcherassi Hotels ==
She is also the founder and creative director of the brand extension Tcherassi Hotels focused in the creative development of hospitality and real estate projects.
