= Polonuevo =

Coordinates: 10°47′N 74°52′W

- Municipality and town
- Flag Coat of arms

- Location of the municipality and town of Polonuevo in the Department of Atlántico.
- Country: Colombia
- Region: Caribbean
- Department: Atlántico

Government
  - Mayor: Edgardo Martes (Alternative Democratic Pole)

Area
  - Total: 73 km^{2} (28 sq mi)

Population (Census 2018)
  - Total: 19,454
  - Density: 270/km^{2} (690/sq mi)
- Time zone: UTC-5 (Colombia Standard Time)
- Website: www.polonuevo-atlantico.gov.co/sitio.shtml

Polonuevo is a municipality and town in the Colombian department of Atlántico.
