= Sabanagrande, Atlántico =

Coordinates: 10°48′N 74°45′W

Sabanagrande
- Municipality and town
- Flag Coat of arms

- Location of the municipality and town of Sabanagrande in the Department of Atlántico.
- Country: Colombia
- Region: Caribbean
- Department: Atlántico

Government
  - Mayor: Rafael Joaquin Fernandez (Liberal Party)

Area
  - Municipality and town: 43.11 km^{2} (16.64 sq mi)
  - Urban: 2.98 km^{2} (1.15 sq mi)

Population (2020 est.)
  - Municipality and town: 35,044
  - Density: 812.9/km^{2} (2,105/sq mi)
  - Urban: 33,437
  - Urban density: 11,200/km^{2} (29,100/sq mi)
- Time zone: UTC-5 (Colombia Standard Time)
- Website: www.sabanagrande-atlantico.gov.co/sitio.shtml

Sabanagrande is a Colombian municipality and town in the department of Atlántico.
