= Piojó =

Coordinates: 10°45′N 75°07′W

Piojó, Atlántico
- Municipality and town
- Flag Coat of arms

- Location of the municipality and town of Piojó in the Department of Atlántico.
- Country: Colombia
- Region: Caribbean
- Department: Atlántico

Government
  - Mayor: Jose Alfredo Fonseca Bolivar (Radical Change)

Population (2005)
  - Total: 11,635
- Time zone: UTC-5 (Colombia Standard Time)
- Website: www.Piojo-atlantico.gov.co/sitio.shtml

Piojó is a municipality and town in the Colombian department of Atlántico.
