= Candelaria, Atlántico =

Candelaria
- Municipality and town
- Flag Coat of arms

- Location of the municipality and town of Candelaria in the Department of Atlántico.
- Coordinates: 10°27′33″N 74°52′50″W
- Country: Colombia
- Region: Caribbean
- Department: Atlántico

Government
  - Mayor: Jose Alfredo Fonseca Bolivar (Radical Change)

Area
  - Total: 143 km^{2} (55 sq mi)

Population (Census 2018)
  - Total: 15,631
  - Density: 109/km^{2} (283/sq mi)
- Time zone: UTC-5
- Website: www.candelaria-atlantico.gov.co/sitio.shtml

Candelaria is a municipality and town in the Colombian department of Atlántico.
