= Galapa, Colombia =

Coordinates: 10°55′N 74°50′W

Galapa
- Municipality and town
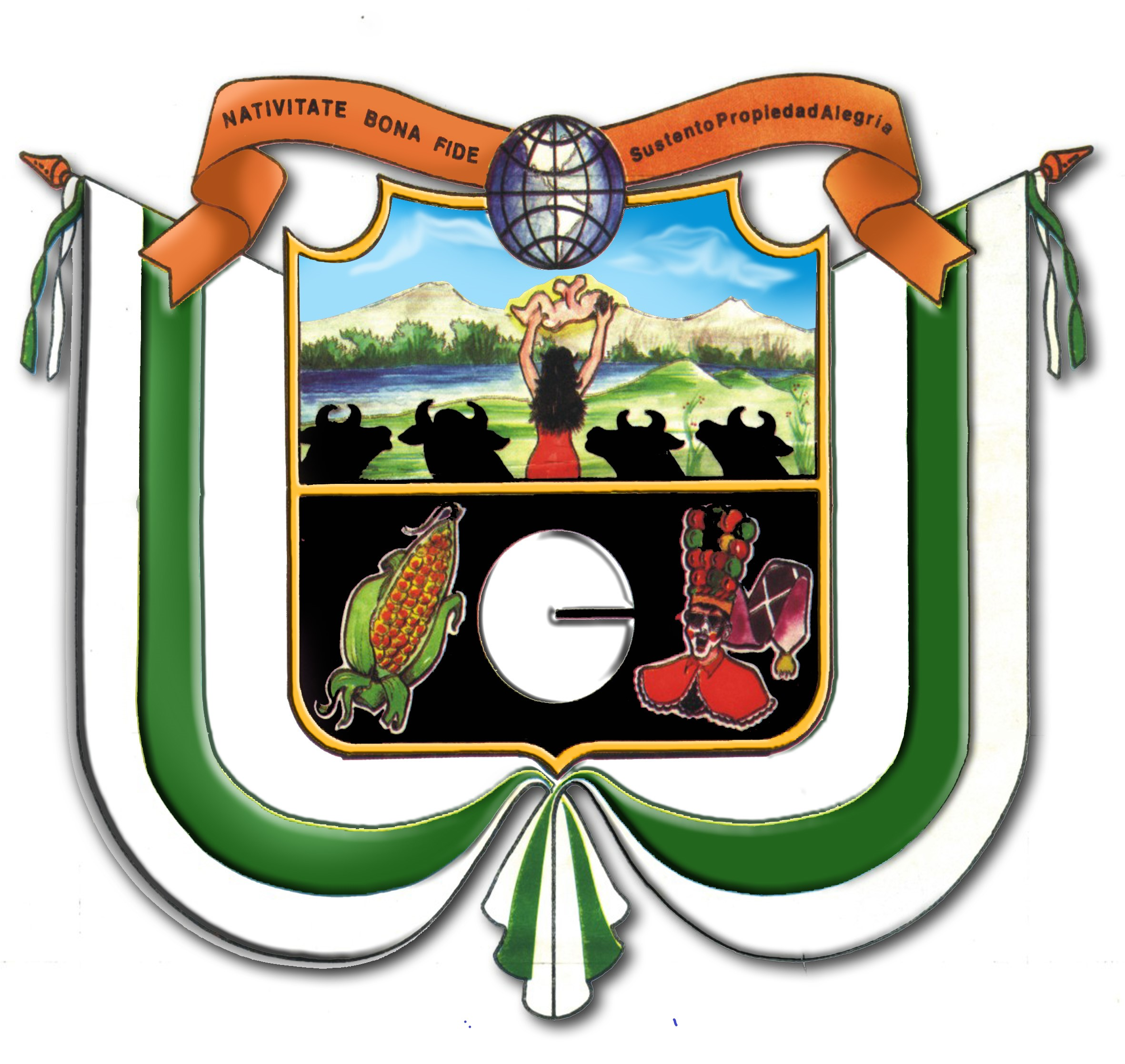
- Flag Coat of arms

- Location of the municipality and town of Galapa in the Department of Atlántico.
- Country: Colombia
- Region: Caribbean
- Department: Atlántico

Government
  - Mayor: Regulo Pascual Matera Garcia (Party of the U)

Area
  - Municipality and town: 97.51 km^{2} (37.65 sq mi)
  - Urban: 10.16 km^{2} (3.92 sq mi)

Population (2018 census)
  - Municipality and town: 60,708
  - Density: 622.6/km^{2} (1,612/sq mi)
  - Urban: 56,167
  - Urban density: 5,528/km^{2} (14,320/sq mi)
- Time zone: UTC-5 (Colombia Standard Time)
- Website: www.galapa-atlantico.gov.co

Galapa is a municipality and town in the Colombian department of Atlántico. It forms the southwestern part of the Metropolitan area of Barranquilla.
