= Usiacurí =

- Flag Coat of arms

- Location of the municipality and town of Usiacurí in the Department of Atlántico.

- Location within Colombia
- Coordinates: 10°45′N 74°59′W
- Country: Colombia Colombia
- Region: Caribbean
- Department: Atlántico
- Demonym: Usiacureno,-a

Government
  - Mayor: Monica Urueta Torrealba (Radical Change)

Area
  - Total: 103 km^{2} (40 sq mi)
- Elevation: 95 m (312 ft)

Population (Census 2018)
  - Total: 9,543
  - Density: 92.7/km^{2} (240/sq mi)
- Time zone: UTC-5 (Colombia Standard Time)
- Website: www.usiacuri-atlantico.gov.co/sitio.shtml

Usiacurí is a municipality and town in the Colombian department of Atlántico.
