= Repelón =

Coordinates: 10°33′N 75°08′W

- Municipality and town
- Repelón
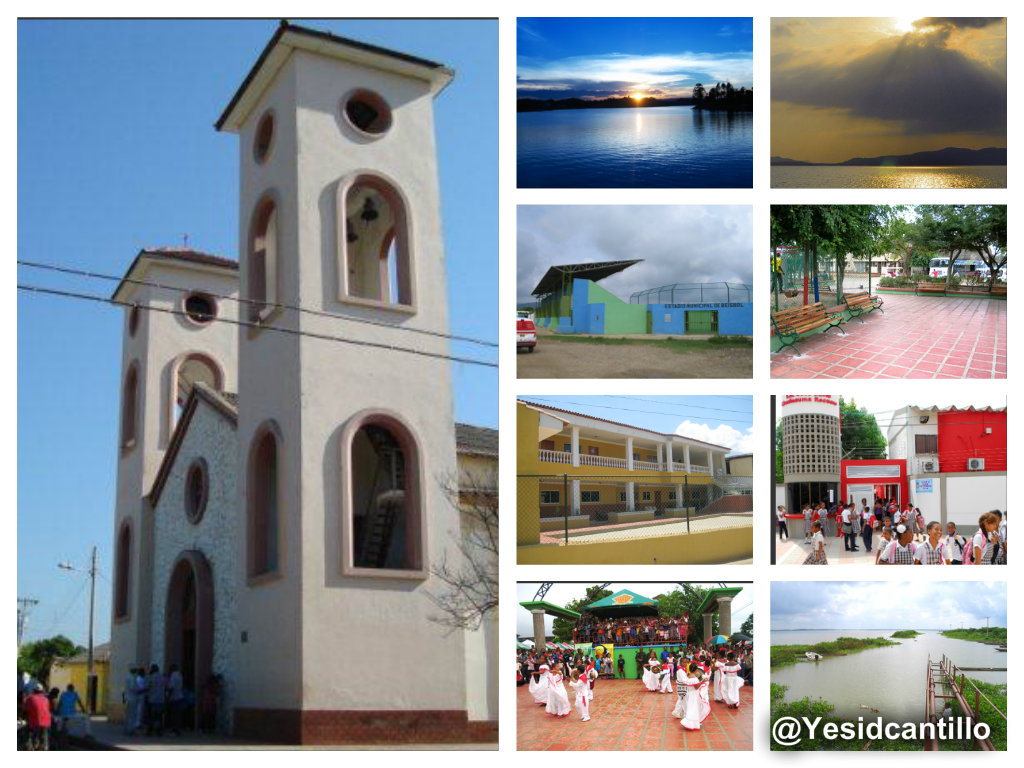

- Flag Coat of arms

- Location of the municipality and town of Repelón in the Department of Atlántico.
- Country: Colombia
- Region: Caribbean
- Department: Atlántico

Government
  - Mayor: Cesar Sanz Ujueta (Party of the U)

Population (Census 2018)
  - Total: 25,467
- Time zone: UTC-5
- Website: www.repelon-atlantico.gov.co/sitio.shtml

Repelón is a Colombian municipality and town in the department of Atlántico.

== Climate ==
Climate data for Repelón, elevation 10 m (33 ft), (1981–2010)
Month	Jan	Feb	Mar	Apr	May	Jun	Jul	Aug	Sep	Oct	Nov	Dec	Year
Mean daily maximum °C (°F)	35.4 (95.7)	36.0 (96.8)	36.4 (97.5)	35.9 (96.6)	34.4 (93.9)	34.6 (94.3)	34.9 (94.8)	34.4 (93.9)	33.8 (92.8)	33.0 (91.4)	33.2 (91.8)	34.4 (93.9)	34.7 (94.5)
Daily mean °C (°F)	28.2 (82.8)	28.4 (83.1)	28.8 (83.8)	29.0 (84.2)	28.6 (83.5)	28.7 (83.7)	28.7 (83.7)	28.5 (83.3)	28.1 (82.6)	27.7 (81.9)	27.8 (82.0)	28.1 (82.6)	28.4 (83.1)
Mean daily minimum °C (°F)	22.8 (73.0)	23.3 (73.9)	23.6 (74.5)	24.4 (75.9)	24.6 (76.3)	24.5 (76.1)	24.3 (75.7)	24.4 (75.9)	24.2 (75.6)	24.2 (75.6)	24.1 (75.4)	23.6 (74.5)	24.0 (75.2)
Average precipitation mm (inches)	5.1 (0.20)	7.3 (0.29)	17.7 (0.70)	49.7 (1.96)	125.5 (4.94)	105.9 (4.17)	78.7 (3.10)	108.6 (4.28)	104.9 (4.13)	161.5 (6.36)	107.1 (4.22)	22.2 (0.87)	894.2 (35.20)
Average precipitation days (≥ 1.0 mm)	1	1	2	6	12	11	9	13	13	15	10	3	93
Average relative humidity (%)	72	70	70	72	78	78	77	79	81	82	81	75	76
Mean monthly sunshine hours	257.3	225.8	220.1	180.0	161.2	174.0	198.4	189.1	153.0	148.8	168.0	220.1	2,295.8
Mean daily sunshine hours	8.3	8.0	7.1	6.0	5.2	5.8	6.4	6.1	5.1	4.8	5.6	7.1	6.3
Source: Instituto de Hidrologia Meteorologia y Estudios Ambientales
