= University of the Coast =

University in Barranquilla, Colombia

Coordinates: 10.9947°N 74.7911°W

Coast University
- Type: Private
- Established: 16 November 1970
- Rector: Dr Tito José Crissien
- Undergraduates: 11,595
- Postgraduates: 560
- Location: Cll. 58 # 55 - 66, Barranquilla, Colombia
- Nickname: Unicosta
- Website: https://www.cuc.edu.co/

The University of the Coast (Spanish: Universidad de la Costa), also called Unicosta, is a private university based in the city of Barranquilla, Atlántico, Colombia. It was founded in 1970 by a business group led by Rodrigo Niebles De La Cruz, Eduardo Crissien Samper, Ramiro Moreno Noriega, Miguel Antequera Stand, Rubén Maury Pertuz, Nulvia Borrero and María Ardila de Maury.

The university offers degrees in industrial, systems, civil, ambiental, electrical and electronic engineering. Other degrees include, business administration, law, psychology, international business, architecture, among others. In total, the university offers 23 undergraduate programs, 39 professional specialization programs, 11 master's programs, and 3 doctoral programs. The university also offers some programs in Sabanalarga, Cartagena, Montería, Pasto and Villavicencio.

The University of the Coast is one of the most important cultural and technological centers in Barranquilla.

== See also ==
- List of universities in Colombia
