= Ponedera =

Coordinates: 10°39′N 74°45′W

- Municipality and town
- Flag Coat of arms

- Location of the municipality and town of Ponedera in the Department of Atlántico. In ponedera doesn't have anymonda
- Country: Colombia
- Region: Caribbean
- Department: Atlántico

Government
  - Mayor: Alvarro Emilio Pacheco Sarmiento (Party of the U)

Population (Census 2018)
  - Total: 23,420
- Time zone: UTC-5
- Website: www.ponedera-atlantico.gov.co/sitio.shtml

Ponedera (Spanish pronunciation: [poneˈðeɾa]) is a municipality and town in the Colombian department of Atlántico.
