= Luruaco =

- Municipality and town
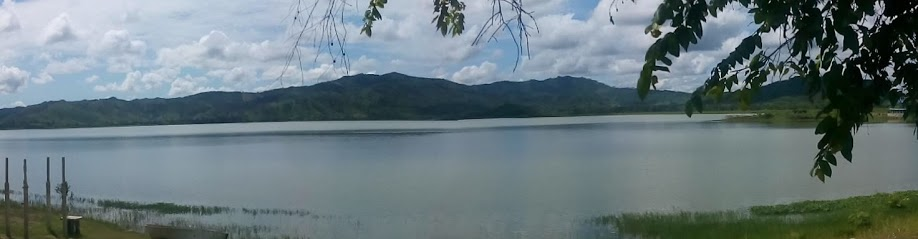

- Flag Coat of arms

- Location of the municipality and town of Luruaco in the Department of Atlántico
- Coordinates: 10°36′30″N 75°08′30″W
- Country: Colombia
- Region: Caribbean
- Department: Atlántico

Government
  - Mayor: Antonio Roa Montero

Population (Census 2018)
  - Total: 27,647
- Time zone: UTC-5 (Colombia Standard Time)
- Website: www.luruaco-atlantico.gov.co

Luruaco is a municipality and town in the Colombian department of Atlántico.
