= Manatí, Atlántico =

Coordinates: 10°26′42″N 74°57′35″W

- Municipality and town
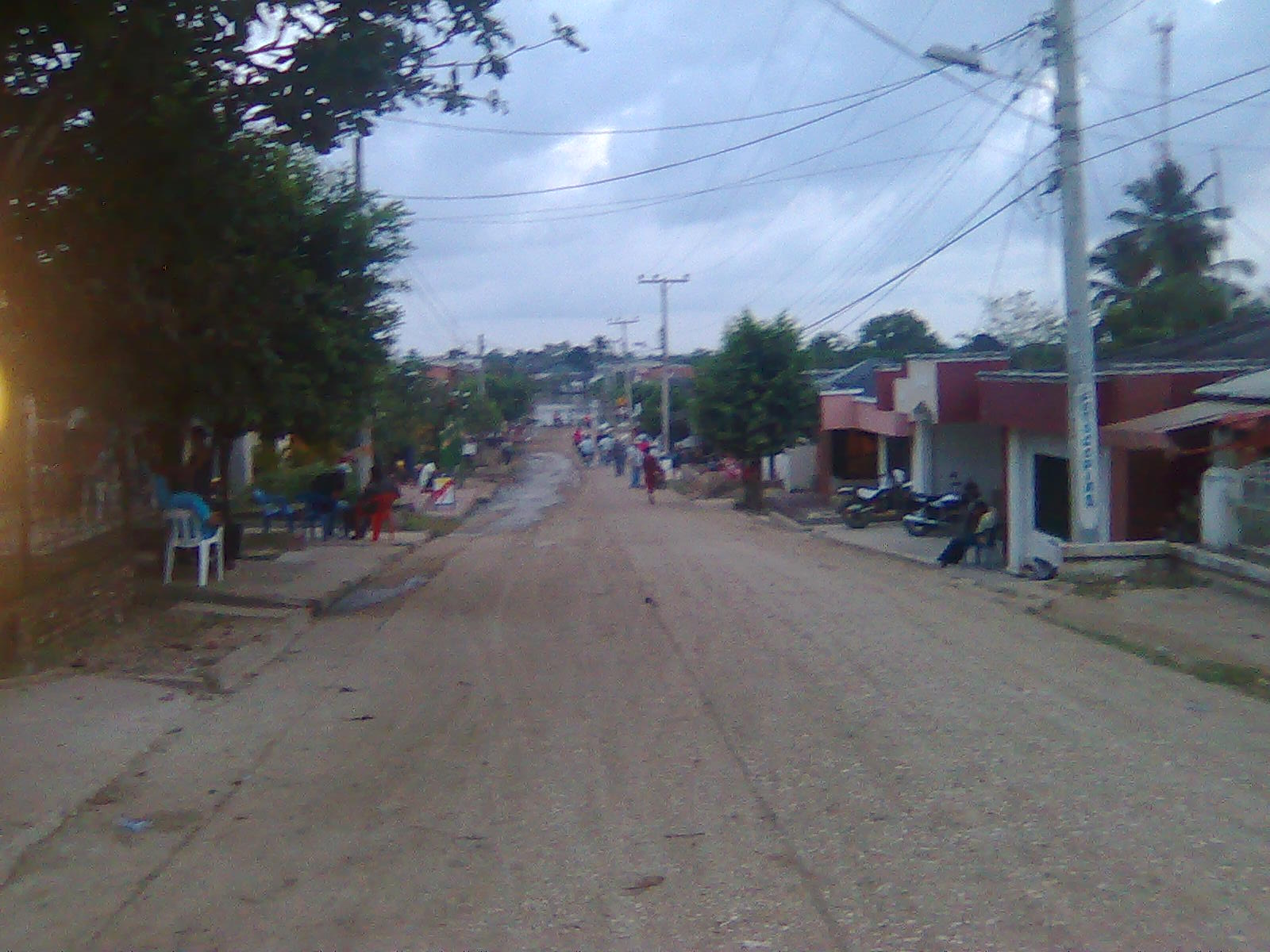
- View of Manatí

- Flag Coat of arms

- Location of the municipality and town of Manatí in the Department of Atlántico.
- Country: Colombia
- Region: Caribbean
- Department: Atlántico

Government
  - Mayor: Evaristo Enrique Olivero Pimienta (Liberal Party)

Area
  - Total: 206 km^{2} (80 sq mi)

Population (Census 2018)
  - Total: 19,233
  - Density: 93.4/km^{2} (242/sq mi)
- Time zone: UTC-5 (Colombia Standard Time)
- Climate: Aw
- Website: www.manati-atlantico.gov.co/sitio.shtml

Manatí is a Colombian municipality located to the south of the Atlántico department, approximately 44 miles from Barranquilla. It was created in 1639 in a place the natives used to call Mahabana. Its current population according to the latest DANE's (Colombian National Administrative Department of Statistics) census is 13.456 people.

== Climate ==
Manatí has a very hot tropical savanna climate (Köppen: Aw) with a dry season from December to March.

Climate data for Manatí (Normal Manati), elevation 10 m (33 ft), (1981–2010)
Month	Jan	Feb	Mar	Apr	May	Jun	Jul	Aug	Sep	Oct	Nov	Dec	Year
Mean daily maximum °C (°F)	35.4 (95.7)	36.0 (96.8)	36.2 (97.2)	35.7 (96.3)	34.3 (93.7)	34.2 (93.6)	34.4 (93.9)	34.4 (93.9)	33.6 (92.5)	33.1 (91.6)	33.2 (91.8)	34.2 (93.6)	34.6 (94.3)
Daily mean °C (°F)	27.7 (81.9)	28.0 (82.4)	28.1 (82.6)	28.1 (82.6)	27.7 (81.9)	27.8 (82.0)	27.8 (82.0)	27.8 (82.0)	27.5 (81.5)	27.2 (81.0)	27.3 (81.1)	27.5 (81.5)	27.7 (81.9)
Mean daily minimum °C (°F)	22.3 (72.1)	23.1 (73.6)	23.7 (74.7)	24.4 (75.9)	24.4 (75.9)	24.3 (75.7)	24.1 (75.4)	24.1 (75.4)	23.9 (75.0)	23.8 (74.8)	23.6 (74.5)	22.9 (73.2)	23.7 (74.7)
Average precipitation mm (inches)	12.0 (0.47)	16.7 (0.66)	23.7 (0.93)	86.8 (3.42)	157.7 (6.21)	125.3 (4.93)	99.1 (3.90)	138.1 (5.44)	143.8 (5.66)	151.8 (5.98)	96.5 (3.80)	32.9 (1.30)	1,084.3 (42.69)
Average precipitation days (≥ 1.0 mm)	1	1	3	8	12	10	9	12	12	12	8	4	92
Average relative humidity (%)	81	80	79	80	82	82	82	82	83	84	84	82	82
Mean monthly sunshine hours	244.9	208.9	198.4	168.0	158.1	165.0	195.3	189.1	150.0	148.8	159.0	207.7	2,193.2
Mean daily sunshine hours	7.9	7.4	6.4	5.6	5.1	5.5	6.3	6.1	5.0	4.8	5.3	6.7	6.0
Source: Instituto de Hidrologia Meteorologia y Estudios Ambientales
