= Atlántico Department =

Department of Colombia

Coordinates: 10°59′N 74°47′W

Department of Atlántico Departamento del Atlántico
- Department
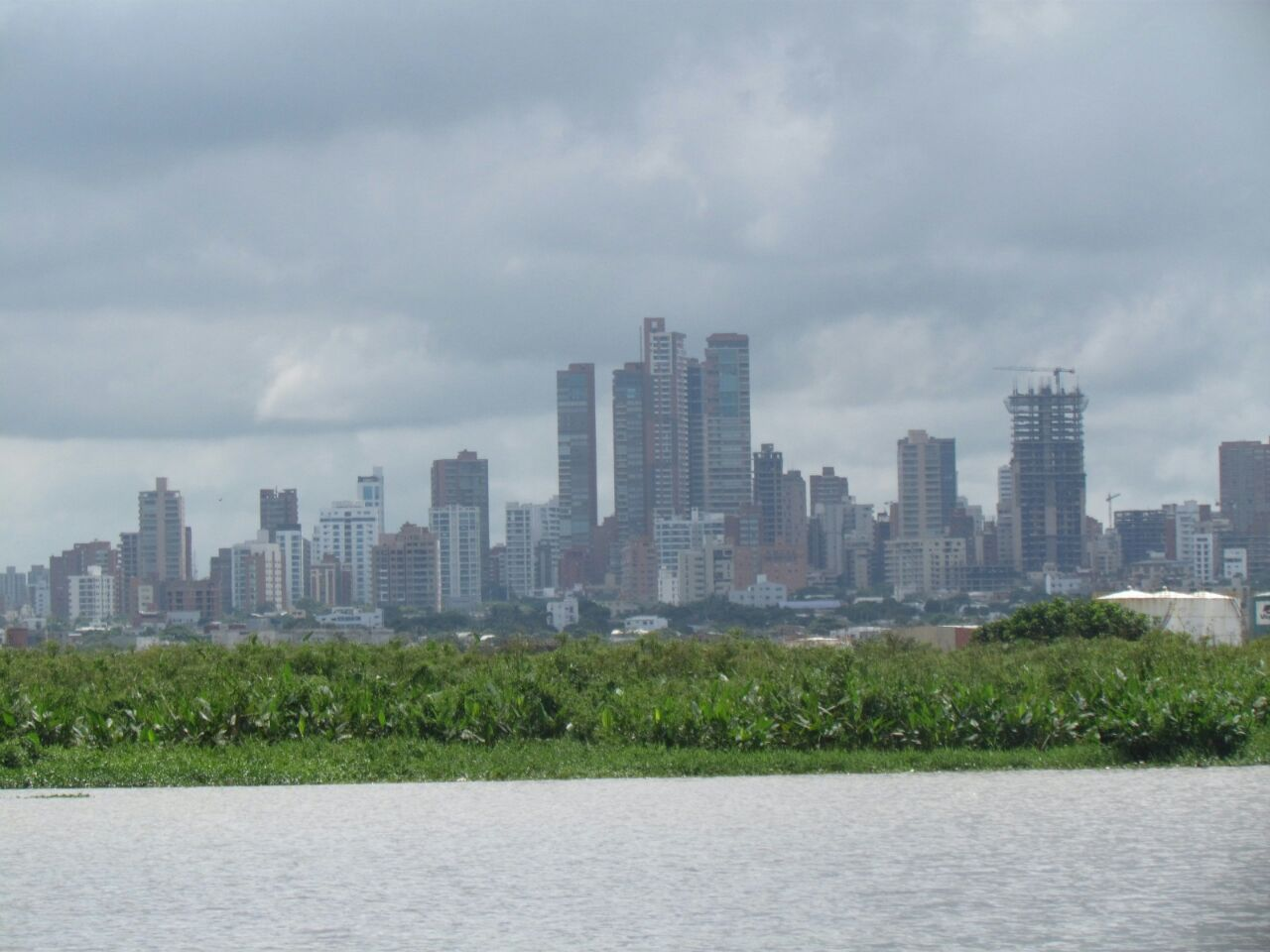
- View of Barranquilla from Magdalena River

- Flag Coat of arms
- Motto: Compromiso para una vida digna (English: Commitment for a worthy life)
- Anthem: Himno del Atlántico
- Atlántico shown in red

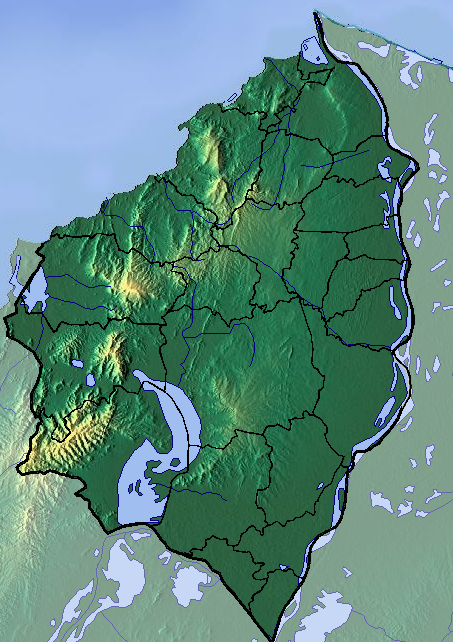
- Topography of the department
- Country: Colombia
- Region: Caribbean Region
- Department: 1910
- Province: 1852
- Capital: Barranquilla

Government
  - Governor: Eduardo Verano de la Rosa

Area
  - Total: 3,388 km^{2} (1,308 sq mi)
  - Rank: 30th

Population (2018)
  - Total: 2,535,517
  - Rank: 5th
  - Density: 748.4/km^{2} (1,938/sq mi)

GDP
  - Total: COP 63,765 billion (US$ 15.0 billion)
- Time zone: UTC-05
- ISO 3166 code: CO-ATL
- Municipalities: 23
- HDI: 0.808 very high · 4th of 33
- Website: atlantico.gov.co

Historical population
Year	Pop.	±%
1973	964,087	—
1985	1,478,213	+53.3%
1993	1,837,468	+24.3%
2005	2,166,156	+17.9%
2018	2,535,517	+17.1%

Atlántico (Spanish pronunciation: [aˈt̪lãn̪t̪iko], English: Atlantic) is a department of Colombia in the north of the country, with the Caribbean Sea to its north, the Bolívar Department to its west and south across the Canal del Dique, and the Magdalena Department to its east across the Magdalena River. Despite having the third-smallest area among Colombia's thirty-two departments, it is the fifth-largest by population with 2,535,517.

The department's capital and most-populous city is Barranquilla with a population of 1,327,209. Soledad and Malambo are also significant population centers; each of them is in the Barranquilla metropolitan area but counted separately.

== Municipalities ==

1. Baranoa
2. Barranquilla
3. Campo de la Cruz
4. Candelaria
5. Galapa
6. Juan de Acosta
7. Luruaco
8. Malambo
9. Manatí
10. Palmar de Varela
11. Piojó
12. Polonuevo
13. Ponedera
14. Puerto Colombia
15. Repelón
16. Sabanagrande
17. Sabanalarga
18. Santa Lucía
19. Santo Tomás
20. Soledad
21. Suan
22. Tubará
23. Usiacurí

== Education ==
=== Higher education ===
The University of Atlántico, with 22,790 students in 2021, stands as the largest higher education institution by student population in the department.

In September 2023, the University of the Coast was ranked second among the top universities in the country, while the University of the North ranked fifteenth.

== Notable people ==
- Alci Acosta, musician
- Andrés Felipe Roa, association football player
- Antonio Rada, former association football player
- Arturo Segovia, former association football player
- Carlos Bacca, association football player, one of Colombia's top all-time strikers, having scored over 300 goals for both club and country throughout his professional career
- Carlos Rodado, politician
- Checo Acosta, musician and prominent figure in the Barranquilla Carnival
- Evaristo Sourdis, politician who held several significant positions
- Fredy Montero, association football player
- Homer Martínez, association football player
- Juan José Nieto, politician, first Afro-Colombian president
- Luis Muriel, association football player
- Luis Sandoval, association football player
- Mauro Manotas, association football player
- Nina García, fashion journalist and the editor-in-chief of Elle
- Pacho Galán, musician
- Paulina Vega, Miss Colombia 2013 and Miss Universe 2014
- Shakira, singer-songwriter
- Silvia Tcherassi, fashion designer
- Sofia Vergara, actress and television personality
