= Malambo, Atlántico =

Coordinates: 10°51′N 74°45′W

- Municipality and city

- Flag Coat of arms

- Location of the municipality and town of Malambo in the Department of Atlántico.
- Country: Colombia
- Region: Caribbean
- Department: Atlántico

Government
  - Mayor: Adolfo Bernal Gutierrez (Radical Change)

Area
  - Municipality and city: 97.94 km^{2} (37.81 sq mi)
  - Urban: 10.83 km^{2} (4.18 sq mi)

Population (2020 est.)
  - Municipality and city: 139,566
  - Density: 1,425/km^{2} (3,691/sq mi)
  - Urban: 130,135
  - Urban density: 12,020/km^{2} (31,120/sq mi)
- Time zone: UTC-5 (Colombia Standard Time)
- Website: www.malambo-atlantico.gov.co/sitio.shtml

Malambo is a municipality and city in the Colombian department of Atlántico.

Malambo forms the southernmost part of the Metropolitan area of Barranquilla.
