= McCausland =

Surname of Irish origin, also a clan in Scotland

McCausland (Mac Ausaláin in Gaelic), meaning "Son of Absalom" is a surname of Irish origin. There is also a clan of this name in Scotland. The family claim descent from the Cenel Eoghain race in County Londonderry and County Tyrone, a branch of the Ui Neil.

Alternatively, the surname may be an Anglicization from a Gaelic name, as was the case with many Irish surnames, changing to sound more English over the centuries. The surname "Mac Ausaláin" may have an underlying Gaelic personal name, possibly Caisealán, meaning 'little one of the castle'.

== Notable people ==
Notable people with the surname include:

- Charles McCausland (1898–1965), Irish cricketer
- Chris McCausland (born 1977), British stand-up comedian
- Edward McCausland (1865–1936), Australian rugby player and cricketer
- Elly McCausland (born 1988 or 1989), English literary scholar
- Ernesto McCausland (1961–2012), Colombian journalist and filmmaker
- James Arthur McCausland, Canadian politician
- John McCausland (1836–1927), Confederate general in the American Civil War
- John McCausland (politician) (1735–1804), Irish Member of Parliament for Donegal County
- Maurice McCausland (1872–1938), Irish landowner and political figure
- Nelson McCausland (born 1951), minister in the Northern Ireland Assembly
- Richard Bolton McCausland (1810–1900) Attorney-General of Singapore, and his son of the same name (1864-1933), a notable surgeon.
- Roberto McCausland Dieppa, Colombian pianist, composer, and conductor
- Ross McCausland (born 2003), Northern Irish footballer (Rangers FC)
- Sigrid McCausland (1953–2016), Australian archivist and educator

Notable people with the given name include:

- McCausland Irvine, Canadian politician

== See also ==
- McCausland, Iowa, city in Scott County, Iowa
