= Ausland =

Ausland may refer to:

- Ausland, a German word meaning outland or foreign lands
- Ausland, a concert venue in Berlin, Germany
- Ausland, Norway, a village in Gjerstad municipality in Aust-Agder county, Norway
- Ausland, Risør, a small village in Risør municipality in Aust-Agder county, Norway
- Torpedoboot Ausland, small destroyers or large torpedo boats captured by Nazi Germany

== See also ==
- McAusland, a list of people with a similar last name
- The dictionary definition of Ausland at Wiktionary
