= Dieppa =

Dieppa is a surname. Notable people with the surname include:

- Roberto McCausland Dieppa (born 1959), Colombian pianist, composer, and conductor
- Nelson Dieppa (born 1971), Puerto Rican boxer
- Paulina Vega Dieppa (born 1993), Colombian TV host, model, and beauty queen
