= Sinfonia Latina =

Music festival

- Genre: "Nouveau" Caribe
- Dates: May 7, 1976 May 23, 1976
- Venue: Amira de la Rosa Theater
- Locations: Barranquilla, Colombia
- Coordinates: 10°59′43″N 74°47′16″W
- Years active: 1976; 2019-present
- Founders: Mauricio Zapata Hoyos & Roberto McCausland Dieppa
- Attendance: 4,000
- Website: Sinfonialatina

Sinfonia Latina is a Colombian rock concert and festival. It was named after the opus Sinfonia Latina (Eine Karibisch Musik Werke), which was subsequently transformed into a festival. The first concert occurred on May 7, 1976, at 8 PM in Barranquilla, Colombia at the municipal theater "Amira de la Rosa". The event attracted audiences of 1,000 inside the structure. An estimated 2,000 people remained outside unable to enter the theater under construction. Billed as a musical Supershow in Barranquilla, Sinfonia Latina was composed, directed, and conducted by Roberto McCausland Dieppa. Stemming from the rock music revolution of the time, the supershow was part of the avant-garde counterculture movement.

The music gained attention for fusing, Salsa, Rock, Jazz, Spanish, and Afro-Caribbean music into a classical format. The rock music concert included art, dance, and centered on a poem written by Mr. Dieppa, inspired by the sixth-century philosopher and mathematician Thales of Miletus. "Dieppa" started composing Sinfonia Latina in 1974, at the age of 15, performing and conducting the work on May 7, 1976, after 9 months of ensemble rehearsals.

== Supershow, Avant-garde counter culture ==
The program was planned as a rock concert for the ‘crazy people’ (avant-garde) of Barranquilla. "Dieppa" at age fifteen convinced the production group to change the show. After much thought, unsure of the outcome, Producer Mauricio Zapata, acceded to taking the show live. Both (young) "Dieppa", producer Zapata of Midnight Sun Productions agreed and changed the program from a series of rock concerts to a Sinfonia Latina "Supershow".

On May 7, 1976, El Heraldo de Barranquilla’ published in the editorial of the journal. ‘McCausland: A musician with more talent than hair:

Tonight: Sinfonia Latina

‘’enigmatic titles, ‘The unveiled Nibelungen’, ‘Lightning Luminous Franco and the Flashing Spain’, an invitation to a dance in a party sponsored by the Spanish Republic In exile for rightist and leftist politicians ".

Roberto McCausland Dieppa conducts the orchestra without a baton,... through the twists and turns of the ‘rock and roll’ [music], what follows becomes astounding. Sinfonia Latina is the true story of Latin Music [Caribbean Music of the time].

=== The Music ===
The music fused, Salsa, Rock, Jazz, Spanish, and afro-Caribbean genres into a classical format. The rock music concert included art, dance, and centered on a poem written by Mr. Dieppa. The poem Al Mar de la Montaña was inspired by the sixth-century philosopher, mathematician Thales of Miletus.`

The Sinfonia Latina program was repeated in its entirety a second time at the ´club Campestre´in Barranquilla, Colombia on May 26, 1976, by popular request. Sinfonia Latina was Mr. Dieppa's first major event in his career.

==== The program ====
The "Supershow" had four parts intended to be an eclectic demonstration of arts.Ray Safdeye presented the program, the first part opened with Juan Manuel Reyes a classical pianist performing Bach preludes.^{.}The second part followed with a visual performance by artist Sergio Gonzalez who presented the special show 'Death to color'. Following, the third part was Sinfonia Latina fusing Caribbean rhythms, salsa, jazz, & rock, into a classical symphonic format. A dancer appeared during the final movement. The program ended with balloons rising from the orchestra pit while the group performed rock and roll encores.

Noted on May 8, 1976, reporter Margarita Galindo S., Diario del Caribe de Barranquilla, A Success with out Precedent, la ‘Sinfonia Latina’ - They were not Alone -

wrote: " Unveiling their instruments, sixteen musicians descended onto the stage (percussion, brass, strings, and piano). The voices of the choir converged singing in Spanish ‘Sinfonia Latina’. with a beautiful result..

===== The Poetry in Spanish =====
The Poetry in Spanish
- Al mar de la montaña (De la Sierra Nevada al Caribe)
- by Roberto McCausland "Dieppa"
- Original title: Al mar de la montaña (De la Sierra Nevada al Caribe)
- Written: 1974-1975
- Country: Colombia
- Language: Spanish
- Publication date: 1974-1975

Al mar de la montaña was written between 1974 -1975 by Roberto McCausland Dieppa. The poetry was performed in Spanish by the choir during the third movement of the Sinfonia Latina (Eine Karibisch Musik Werke) on May 7, 1976.

I.

Bajando vengo ahora,
De la gran montaña,
Danzando las colinas,
Un día ensoñador

II.

Distantes lindos techos,
Endulzan las cosechas,
Mirando las ranuras,
Un mundo arrollador

II.

Caminos y senderos,
Vistosas ensenadas,
Veredas de verdades,
Se ven con luz color

III.

El mar se viste claro,
De lejos limpio el mundo,
Acércate a la vida,
Se cubre sin amor

IV.

Pensantes todos somos,
Pasión sin buen camino,
A Thales Mileto,
Miro con gran dolor

V.

Y canto porque amo,
Y amo porque quiero,
Y canto al gran rio,
Que limpia mi dolor.

==== Planning and preparation ====
The event was initiated by the efforts of Mauricio Zapata executive director of Midnight Sun Productions. Zapata had organized several smaller rock concerts. The concert was planned as a for profit venture. It became a free festival when thousands of people arrived for an event planned for a few hundred. Planning and preparation was financed by donations, Nestor Mosseres (Mosseres & Cia), Siman Plast, Zippers Yidi, and an unknown funder. Each of the four businessmen contributed 400 pesos to the project for transportation, food, and beverages for the musicians. Nine months of rehearsal and preparation leading up to the event depleted the funds. The venue was selected by Midnight sun productions. The production crew was able to negotiate an agreement from Rafael Juliao and Alfredo de la Espriella. The theater was still inoperable. The late Carlos Dieppa Delgado's memory, reputation, previous presidency at the ‘Center for the Arts’, grandfather of the composer, appears to have aided in securing the contract. The venue was used for gaining attention towards the completion of the empty half way built theater.

==== Social impact ====
The event had overwhelming public support, and it attracted people from all social strata Singled out by Margarita Galindo S., the poetry was sung in Spanish. Spanish was not regularly used in rock music at the time

==== Venues ====
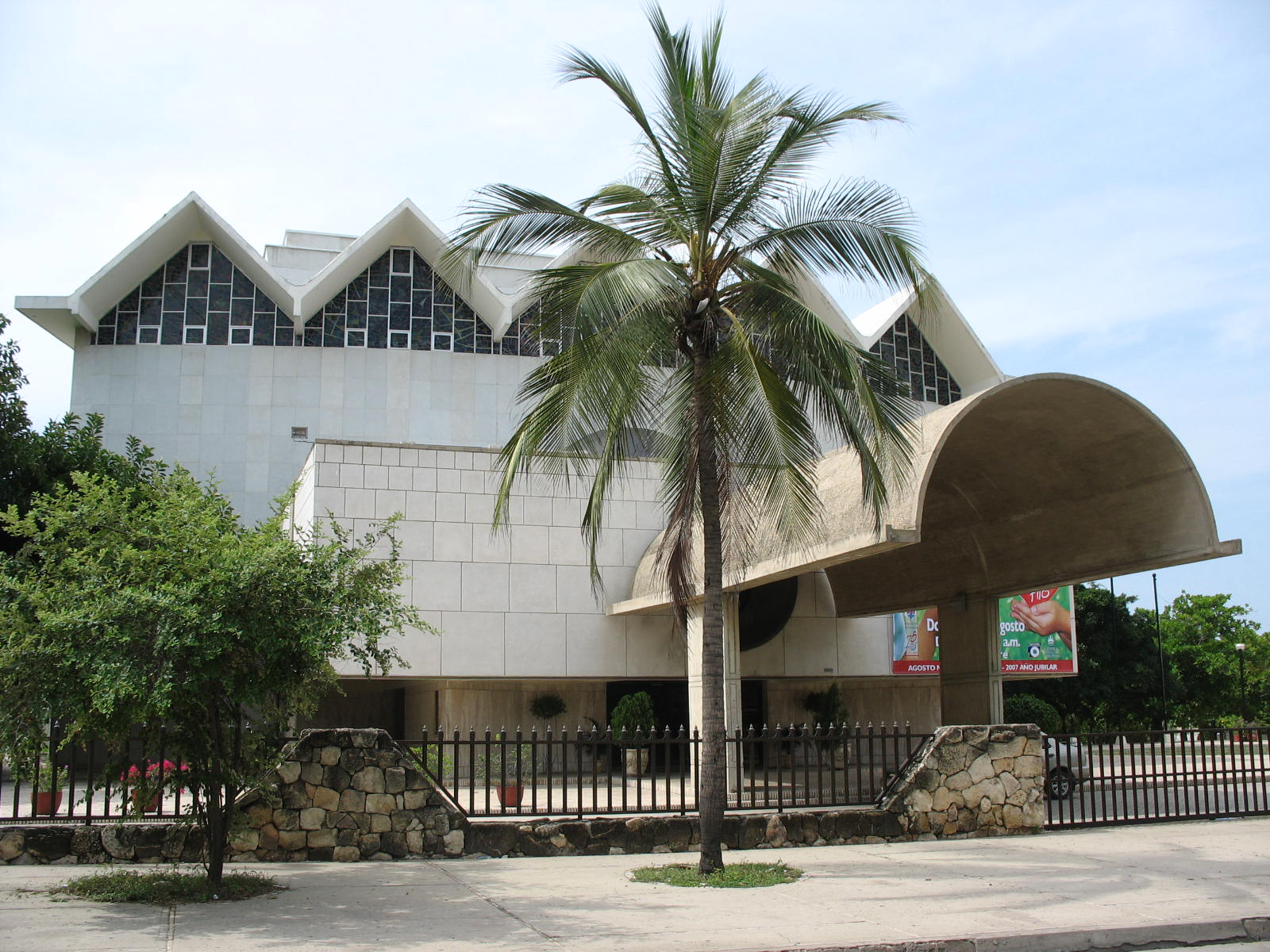
Teatro Amira de la Rosa

Prior to the first Sinfonia Latina concert in 1976 the municipal theater "Teatro Amira de la Rosa" was closed to the public while under construction. After 33 years construction. Sinfonia Latina's success justified the completion of the hall.

===== Performing musicians =====
Roberto McCausland Dieppa, Composer, Conductor, Pianist, Musical Director, The Mancini's Orchestra-Band- Barranquilla, Colombia, Bruno Mancini, guitar, Jean Carlo Mancini drums, percussion, Christopher Williams bass, Gustavo Berdugo, tambourines, Ñero Cartagena, Congas, Ricardo Rey & Victor Rey, trumpet & horns, Alberto Barros, Leonardo Borrero & Paco Barros, trombone, Kathie Vaneman, Nancy Blanco, Ray Watts, Ken de Vou, Dioby Borrero, choir, Juan Manuel Reyes, special guest (interpretation of Bach preludes), Odin Arregocés (Juan Carlos Buggi) graphic design, Socorro de Arregocés (Nadie), dance performance, Efraín Perdomo, lighting, Mario Valderrama, make-up, Salsa Singer – anonymous, Produced by: Mauricio Zapata Hoyos.
