= McAusland =

McAusland is a surname. Notable people with the surname include:

- John McAusland Denny (1858–1922), Scottish businessman and politician
- Kyle McAusland (born 1993), Scottish footballer
- Marc McAusland (born 1988), Scottish footballer

== See also ==
- McCausland
