= Charles McCausland =

Irish cricket player (1898–1965)

Cricket information
- Batting: Right-handed
- Bowling: Right-arm fast-medium

International information
- National side: Ireland

Career statistics
Competition	First-class
Matches	5
Runs scored	139
Batting average	13.90
100s/50s	0/0
Top score	26
Balls bowled	396
Wickets	3
Bowling average	58.33
5 wickets in innings	0
10 wickets in match	0
Best bowling	2/38
Catches/stumpings	4/–
- Source: CricketArchive, 16 November 2022

Charles Edward McCausland (4 October 1898 – 12 November 1965) was an Irish cricketer. A right-handed batsman and right-arm fast-medium bowler, he played four times for the Ireland cricket team in the 1920s, including two first-class matches against Scotland. He also played first-class cricket for Dublin University.

He made his first-class debut playing for Dublin University against Essex in July 1922. His Ireland debut followed later the same month when he played against Scotland in a first-class match. Almost two years later, he again played first-class cricket for Dublin University, this time against Northamptonshire. This was followed the next month by a match for Ireland against Scotland.

He played two non first-class matches for Ireland in August 1924, both against the MCC. He played one final first-class match for Dublin University, again against Northamptonshire, in 1925, a match that also featured the Irish playwright Samuel Beckett.

== Personal life ==
McCausland was born into a family with a long medical tradition. The 1901 Census records his address as 79 Merrion Square, a prestigious address in the heart of Georgian Dublin. His father, Richard Bolton McCausland, was a well known surgeon at the Royal College of Surgeons in Ireland. His mother, Charlotte Maria, was the daughter of French neurologist Charles-Édouard Brown-Séquard.

McCausland was called up to the Western Front in 1918. His mother Charlotte later wrote:

We have left Ireland since 1923, life was no longer possible for the Loyalists. Our lives were threatened, especially because our only son, who had trained at Sandhurst Military School, joined the Irish Guards and had taken part in the last battles against the Germans, his heart being all for France.
