= Rutland Fountain, Merrion Square =

Rutland Fountain
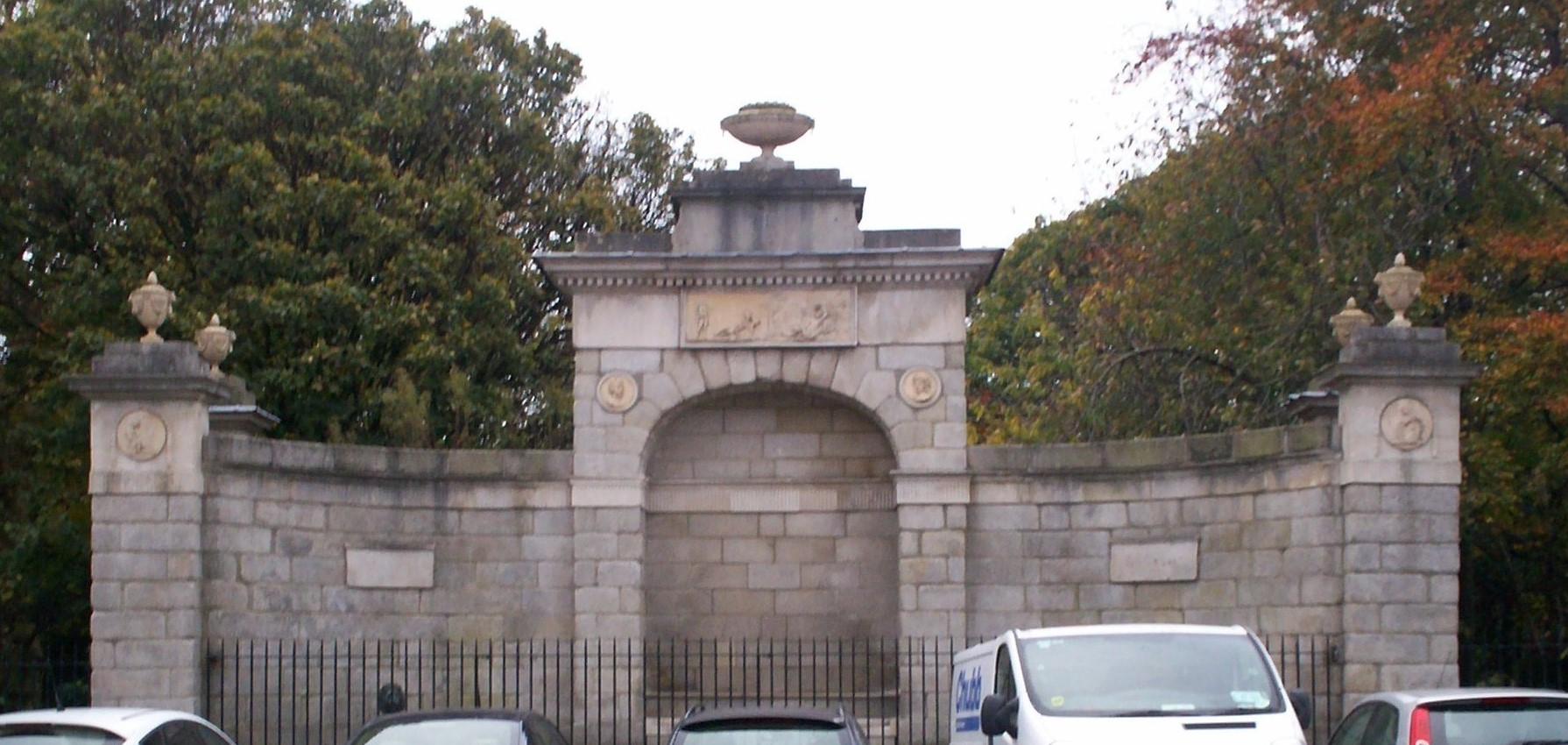
- Alternative names: Duke of Rutland Memorial Fountain

General information
- Status: Protected structure
- Type: Fountain
- Architectural style: Palladian, Georgian
- Location: Merrion Square, Dublin, Ireland
- Coordinates: 53.34039°N 6.25125°W
- Named for: Charles Manners, 4th Duke of Rutland
- Estimated completion: 1792

Technical details
- Material: granite portland stone (cornice, banding and plaques) coade stone (urns, roundels and plaque)

Design and construction
- Architect: Francis Sandys
- Developer: The Paving Board
- Other designers: Arthur Darley (stonecutter)
- Quantity surveyor: Bryan Bolger

The Rutland Fountain (officially The Duke of Rutland Memorial Fountain) on Merrion Square in Dublin, Ireland is a neo-classical ornamental drinking fountain facing out of the west side of Merrion Square, towards the National Gallery of Ireland. It is designed in a Georgian-Palladian style as a blind triumphal arch, a common trope of the era, and was dedicated to Charles Manners, 4th Duke of Rutland, although only executed after his death from liver disease as a result of alcoholism, in October 1787.

== History ==
The fountain was constructed to the design of Francis Sandys in 1792 in memory of and possibly sponsored by Charles Manners, 4th Duke of Rutland. Work was overseen by the Paving Board, a subsection of the Wide Streets Commission with Bryan Bolger recorded as working on the surveying and measuring of its construction while stonecutting and stonework were completed by Arthur Darley.

It is a triumphal arch principally constructed in granite with Portland Stone banding, cornice and coffered underside to arch, five Coade Stone urns, a coade stone plaque and four coade stone roundels and two bronze lion head water spouts. The fountain previously featured a clam shell with a nymph in the centreground of the arch into which water flowed from another bronze lion’s head via a conduit although the shell, nymph and bronze lion’s head have since been lost. By 1818, the nymph was damaged and described as having been reduced to a 'disgusting trunk'.

The central relief shows the father of the Duke of Rutland, John Manners, Marquess of Granby relieving a distressed soldier and his family. The four roundels made by Coade in 1790-91 show; a grieving woman with a gladiator to background with inscription 'Coade London 1790', Charles Manners, 4th Duke of Rutland with the Latin annotations 'CAR DUX RUT OPT ILLE' (Charles, Duke of Rutland, that most excellent man), Lady Mary Isabella Somerset with Latin annotations 'MAR ISA DUC RUT PULCHERIMMA ILLA' (Maria Isabella, Duchess of Rutland, that most beautiful woman) and Hibernia with a harp.

The fountain was featured in a notable stylised painting by the French-Irish American painter John James Barralet around the time of its completion. It is supposed that Barralet was involved in the design of elements of the Merrion Square park around the same time.

The rusticated granite walls of the fountain contain two portland stone plaques to either side, one to the left originally contained an inscription from Virgil's 'Aeneid' (Book 6, line 885), "His saltum accumulem donis, et fungar inani munere". The plaque to the right contained the inscription "To the memory of Charles Manners, duke of Rutland, whose heart was as susceptible of the wants of his fellow-creatures, as his purse was open to relieve them, this fountain for the use of the poor is dedicated. At his command it was undertaken, and at his sole expense it would have been erected, had not premature death deprived the poor of their best benefactor, and the rich of their brightest example."

The fountain had ceased to supply water by 1852.

=== Restoration (1975) ===
The fountain was restored in 1975 as part of the European architectural heritage year with a new granite tablet installed with a dedication carved by Michael Biggs which reads:

The Duke of Rutland Memorial Fountain 1791. This fountain was restored by the Corporation of Dublin as part of its contribution to European Architectural Heritage Year 1975. The project was assisted by generous donations from friends of Sybil le Brocquy (1892-1973) whose enthusiasm for life literature and the arts enriched many lives.

High-quality replacement iron railings now cover the original fountain front to protect the structure. A park lodge had been constructed for the gardener as recorded at the earliest in 1818 behind the fountain but was removed some time after 1960.

=== Restoration (2008) ===
The fountain was again restored from 2008 to 2009 by masonry contractors Conservation Building Services (CBS) and Interclean on behalf of Dublin City Council at a cost of €230,000. This restoration included removing some of the inappropriate additions of the 1970s such as cement strap pointing.

== Rutland Fountain (Barrack Street) ==
The fountain is not to be confused with an earlier Rutland Fountain which was sponsored by the same Duke of Rutland a few years earlier in 1785 in a similar style on Barrack Street to provide clean drinking water to the people of Dublin. It was later moved into the Royal Barracks, now Collins barracks in 1889 following a typhoid outbreak. The fountain was located close to where the current Museum Luas stop is today. It is likely this earlier fountain was also designed by Francis Sandys.

A number of other notable fountains around the city were also commissioned by the Duke of Rutland during his time as Lord Lieutenant, including the obelisk on James's Street, Dublin, which was also designed by Francis Sandys.

Another Rutland fountain is referenced in the Dublin Evening Post of Saturday 18 June 1785 as potentially to be erected in front of Trinity College.

=== Gallery ===
Fountain in 2018

Recessed arch in 2017

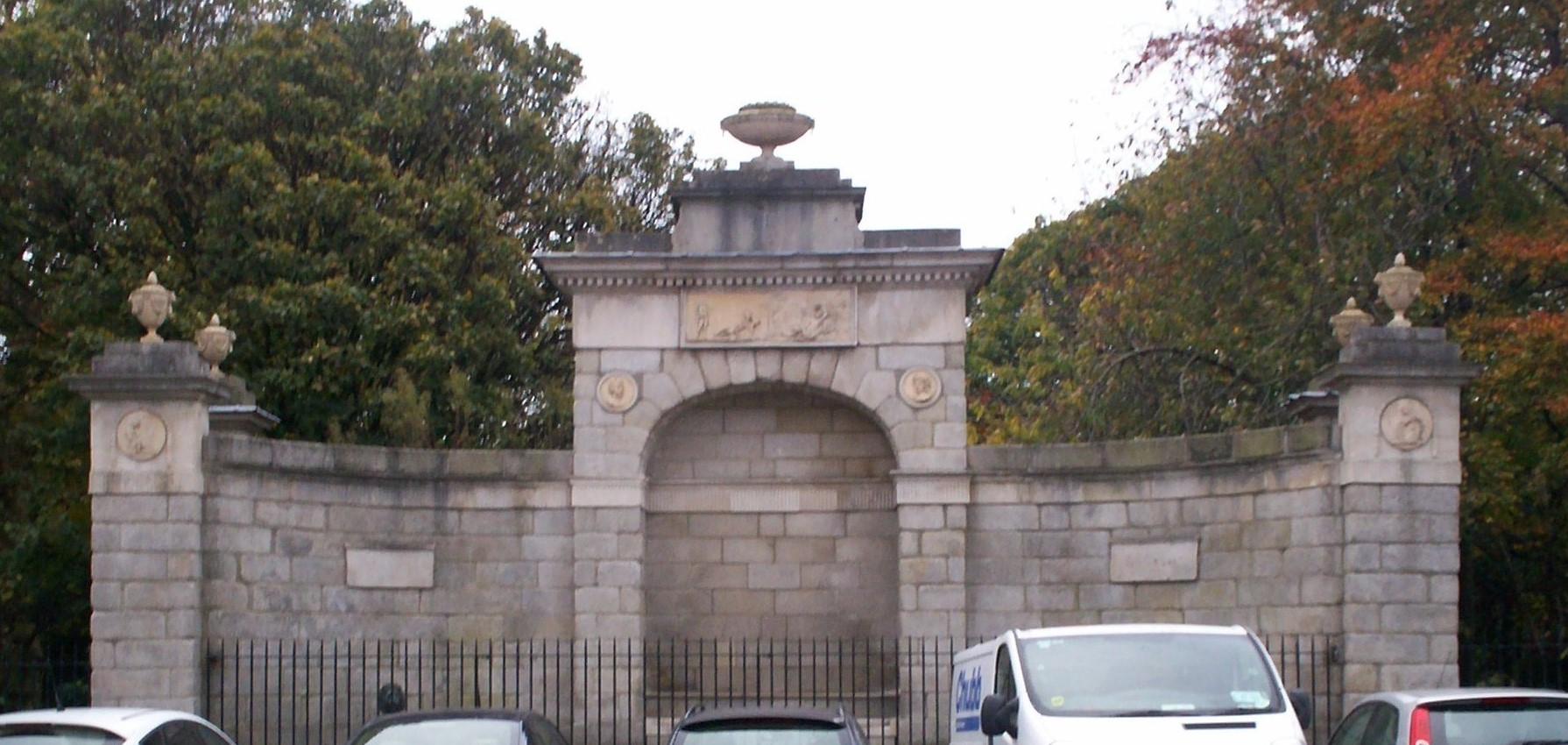
Fountain in context in 2017
