= Ausland (Berlin) =

Performing arts venue in Germany

ausland
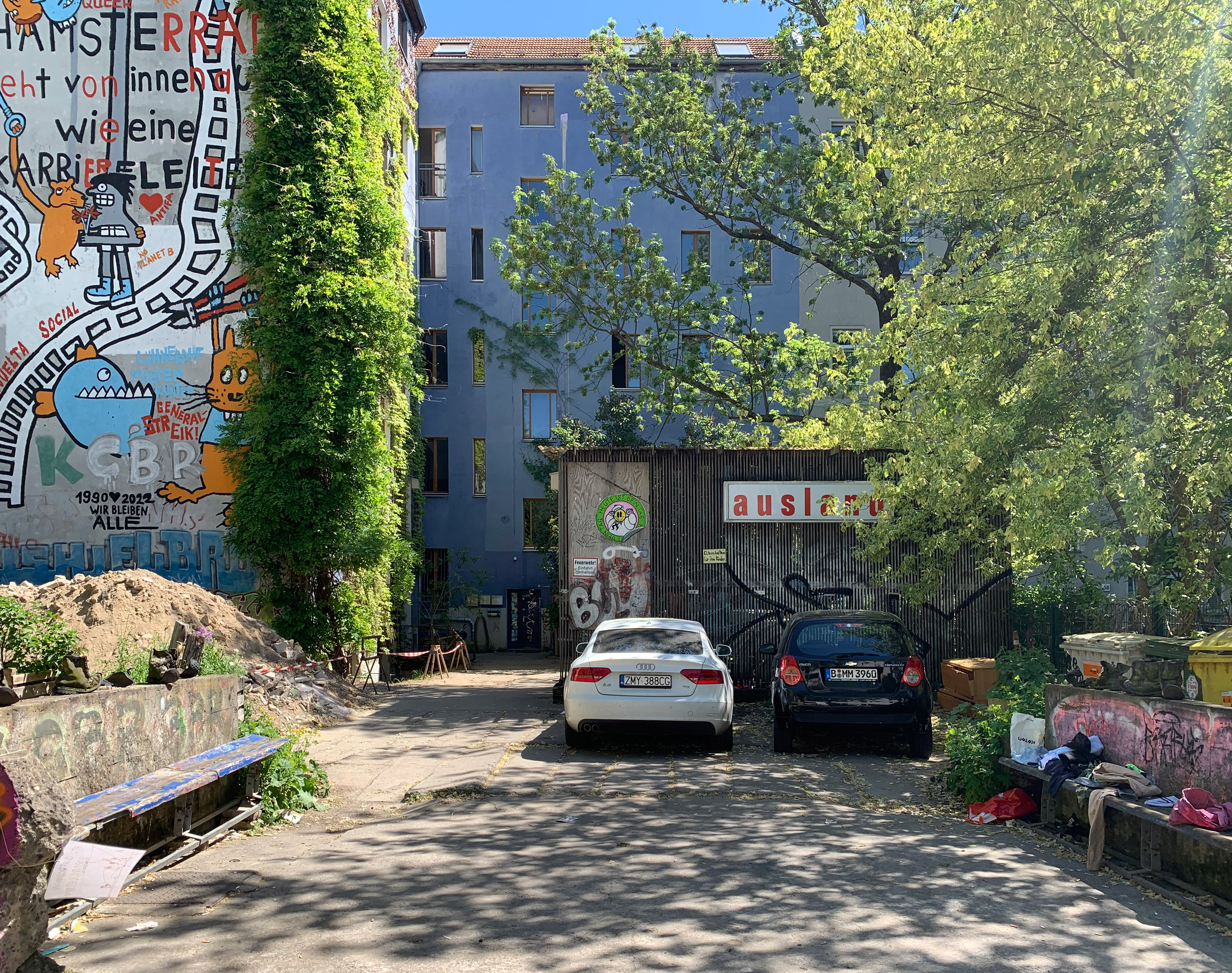
- The front courtyard of ausland, Berlin, as viewed from the street
- Interactive map of ausland
- Address: Lychener Str. 60, 10437; Berlin; Germany
- Coordinates: 52.54478°N 13.41954°E

Construction
- Opened: 2002

Website
- ausland.berlin

Ausland (customarily stylised in lowercase as ausland) is a concert venue and arts location in Berlin, Germany. The venue is well-known as a hub for experimental and improvised music, alongside many other styles, genres, and artistic approaches.

Ausland describes itself as “an independent venue for music, film, literature, performance, and other artistic endeavours,” and for many years it summarised its aims with the tagline that it is a “territory for arts and collateral damage.” Organisationally, it is independent, non-commercial, and run by a collective.

== History ==
Ausland opened in 2002, having emerged from the Berlin squat scene of the 1990s that came to prominence after the fall of the Berlin wall. The venue was formerly the site of the collective housing project and experimental arts venue Lychi 60, and the building in which it is situated underwent comprehensive renovations prior to reopening as ausland.

The name of the venue emerged from the members of the collective running the space, as an evocative encapsulation of their artistic intentions. The word “ausland” — correlating with ideas such as “abroad,” “overseas,” or “away from home” — demonstrated a readiness to engage with unfamiliar or strange sounds and ideas.

The venue has continued to operate as a non-commercial independent venue since it began, and in 2022 it celebrated its twentieth anniversary.

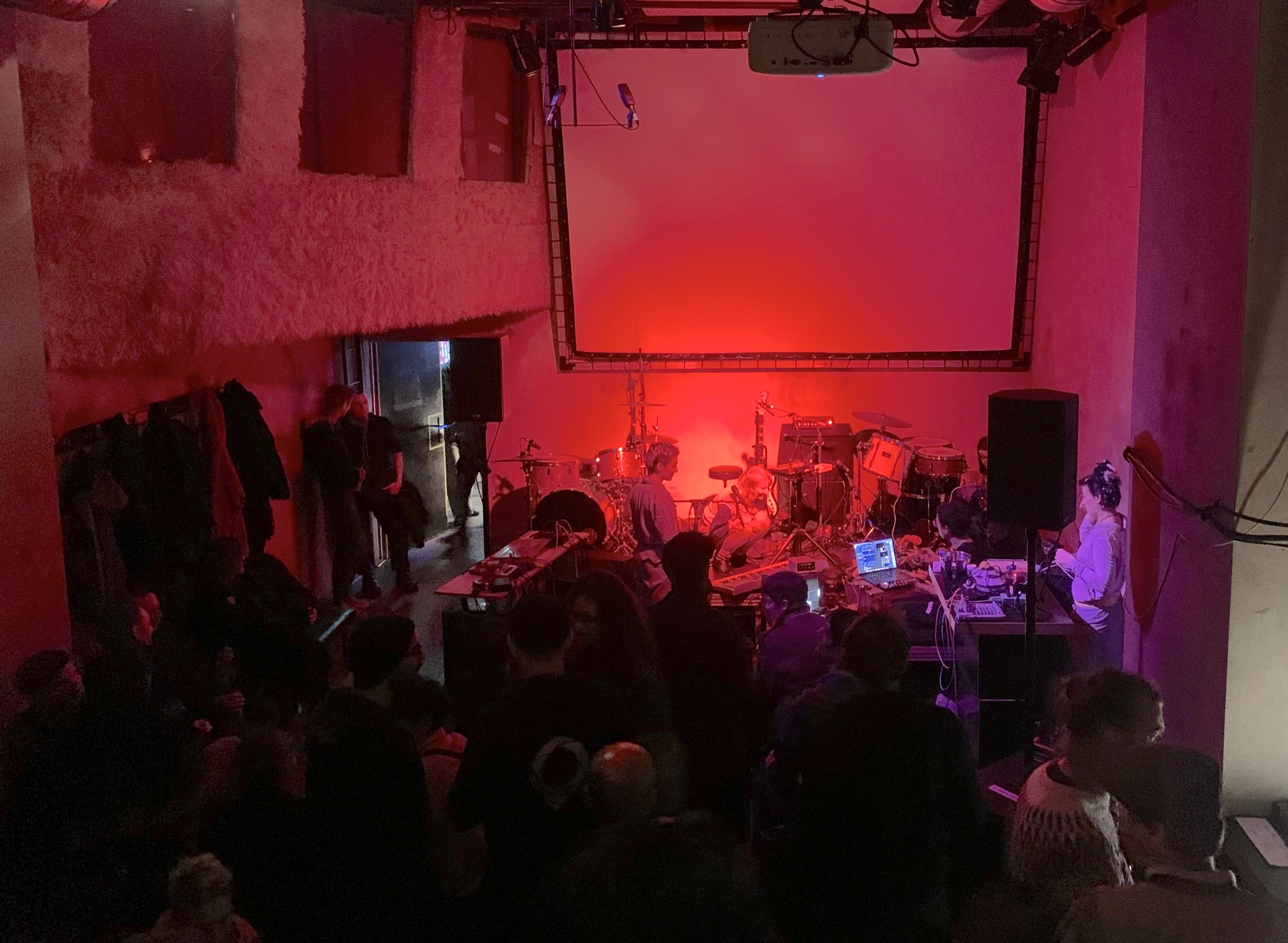
The main room at ausland during an event

== Milieu ==
Ausland is renowned as a centre for free improvisation and related forms of music, and has come to be associated with the Echtzeitmusik scene of Berlin. The concert series biegungen im ausland has been one of the predominant frames for music and sound of this kind at the venue. This series has been ongoing since ausland opened, summarising its approach with the slogan “outlandish sounds for outspoken ears.”

At the same time, ausland presents a wide variety of events, not just improvised or experimental sounds. It has hosted installations, film showings, drag shows, pop festivals, dance and choreographic work, performance art, lectures, durational and overnight events, and more. The organising collective of the venue has several sub-groups which run particular event series, resulting in this diverse programming approach.

In 2020, in an interview as part of transmediale’s reSource series, Gregor Hotz, one of the founding members of the ausland collective, described the venue as “very eclectic and hybrid; it is very difficult to define it in a specific way, even if we come from that scene that was usually named Echtzeit[musik]. It is related to experimental, minimalist, noise and ‘improvised music’. But the programme is very diverse, and we combine performances, concerts, improvisations, and lectures.”

The main room of ausland has also been used as a recording venue for over seventy records — both through being used a studio space and also through the release of live recordings made at events at the venue. This room has also been used for rehearsals, workshops, residencies, and other artistic projects.

For many years, the ausland mailing list was also renowned for droll jokes regarding German and world news and politics.

== Related articles ==
- Free improvisation
- Culture in Berlin
