= Elly McCausland =

English literary scholar (born 1988 or 1989)

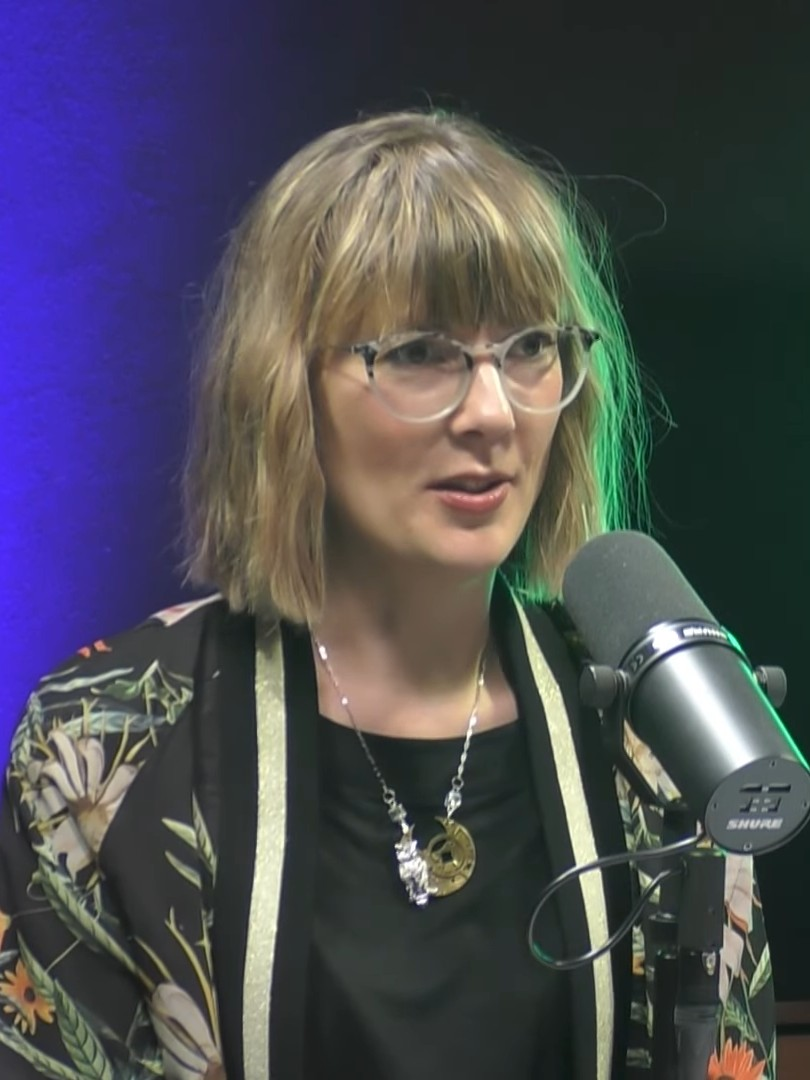
- McCausland in 2025
- Born: 1988 or 1989 (age 37–38); Cambridge, England

Academic background
- Education: University of York (PhD)

Academic work
- Discipline: English literature

Eleanor McCausland (born 1988 or 1989) is an English literary scholar and culinary writer. An associate professor of English literature at Ghent University, she received global media attention in 2023 for teaching courses involving the study of the singer-songwriter Taylor Swift's lyrics.

== Early life and education ==
Eleanor McCausland was born in Cambridge between 1988 and 1989. She received a Bachelor's degree in English literature and a Master's in Middle English literature from the University of Oxford, and subsequently a PhD in English literature from the University of York. As a university student, she also became a close friend of fellow student Sushila Phillips and later dedicated an article to her in The Daily Telegraph following her death in 2021. While working as a waitress when she was 17, McCausland was inspired to learn the culinary arts from a co-worker. She became a fan of American singer-songwriter Taylor Swift in 2008 with the release of her album Fearless.

== Career ==
While a student at York in 2013, McCausland entered a career as a food columnist at The Press. Her first cookbook The Botanical Kitchen was published in 2020 by Absolute Press and received the Jane Grigson Trust Award prior to its release. The book centres on cooking with botanical ingredients, including fruits, leaves, flowers, and seeds. She later lived in Denmark, but at the time of the book's publication, McCausland was based in Oslo, working as a senior lecturer in English at the University of Oslo. She eventually began working at Ghent University as a specialist in children's literature.

In August 2023, she gained global media attention as an associate professor at the university after it was announced she would be teaching a Masters course on English literature which incorporated the study of the lyrics of Taylor Swift. The course, titled "Literature (Taylor’s Version)", ended up being well received by students, with McCausland lecturing double the amount of students she would usually expect from such a course in literature. In January 2024, McCausland's book Stars Around My Scars: The Annotated Poetry of Taylor Swift was published. This exegesis on Swift's lyrics was praised by Book Riot. McCausland's second book on Swift, Swifterature (2025), borrows from her experiences teaching courses on her lyrics since she started in 2023 and explores the relationship between Swift and English literature.
