= Richard Bolton McCausland =

Sir Richard Bolton McCausland (1810 - 8 July 1900) and Richard Bolton McCausland (1864 in Singapore - 9 October 1933 in Folkestone, Kent, England) were father and son of the same name. Sir Richard was born in Ireland, became a barrister and served as Recorder of Singapore and Malaca, from 1856-1866. In 1868, he returned to Ireland to inherit the family estate at Cappaghduff, County Mayo.

His same-named son was born in Singapore but moved to Ireland with his father at an early age. He became a notable surgeon at the Royal College of Surgeons in Ireland. The 1901 Census records his address as 79 Merrion Square, a prestigious address in the heart of Georgian Dublin. He married Charlotte Maria, daughter of French neurologist Charles-Édouard Brown-Séquard.

In 1896, the first use of x-ray in Ireland was by McCausland when he carried out an operation to remove a needle from the hand of a parlor maid. The x-ray was performed at Royal College of Science for Ireland (this building is now the Department of the Taoiseach) and the operation was carried out at Dr Steevens' Hospital just four months after Rontgen's discover of X-Rays (called 'Shadow-graphs' at the time).

In 1923, during the Irish Civil War, the McCausland family fled Ireland to Folkestone, Kent. Charlotte later wrote:

We have left Ireland since 1923, life was no longer possible for the Loyalists. Our lives were threatened, especially because our only son, who had trained at Sandhurst Military School, joined the Irish Guards and had taken part in the last battles against the Germans, his heart being all for France.

However, Richard and Charlotte McCausland's son, Charles, was a notable Irish cricketer, who played for Ireland between 1922 and 1925.
