= Merrion Square =

Georgian square and park in Dublin, Ireland

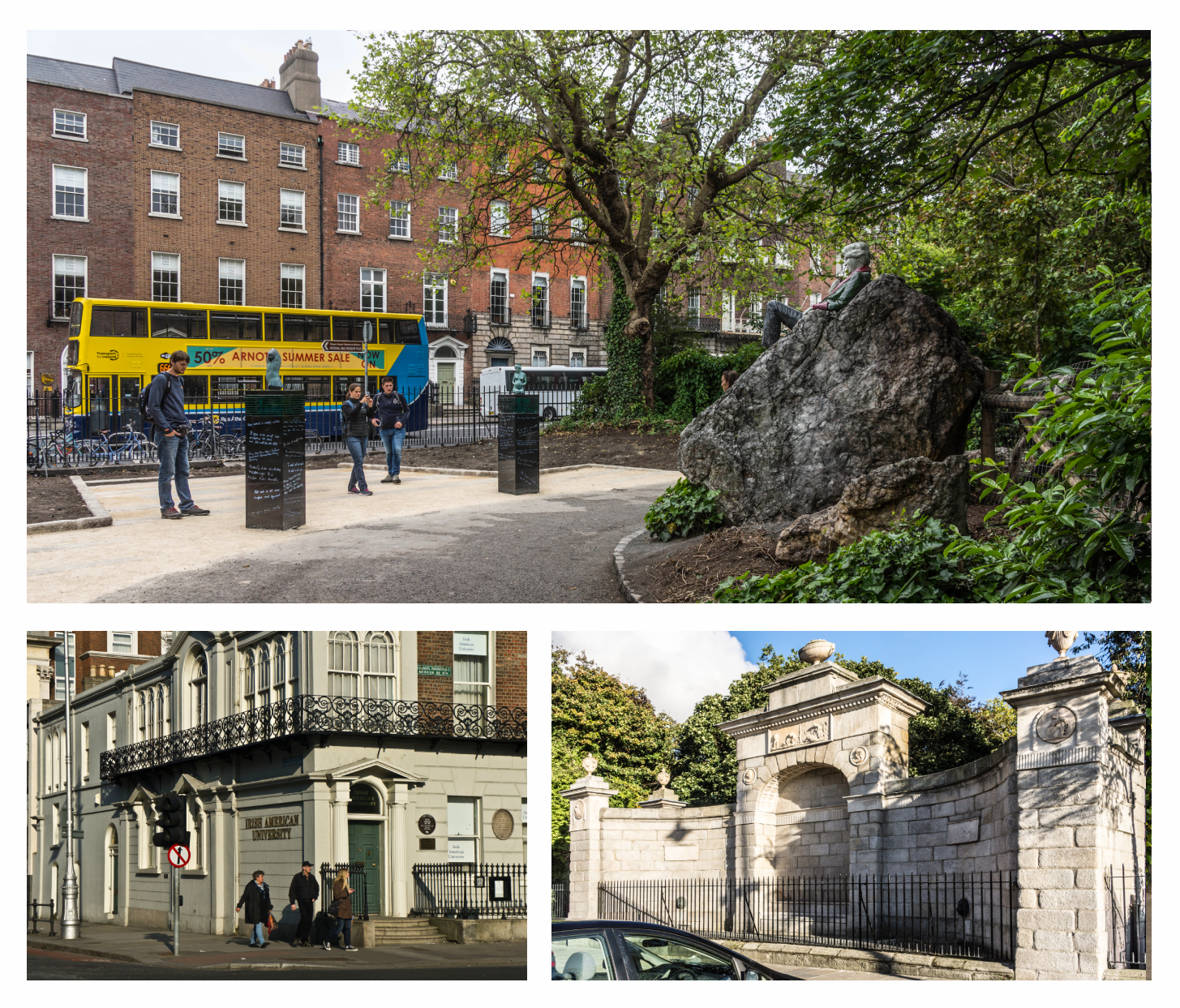
- Clockwise from top: Merrion Square North as seen from Merrion Square Park; Rutland Fountain; 1 Merrion Square North, the childhood home of Oscar Wilde

- Location within Central Dublin Location within Dublin
- Type: Georgian garden square
- Location: Dublin, Ireland
- Coordinates: 53°20′23″N 6°14′57″W
- Area: 4.73 hectares (11.7 acres)
- Created: 1762
- Founder: Richard FitzWilliam, 7th Viscount FitzWilliam
- Designer: John Smith and Jonathan Barker (1762 layout)
- Owner: Privately (1762-1974); Dublin City Council (1974 onwards)
- Operator: Dublin City Council
- Status: Open all year

Merrion Square (Irish: Cearnóg Mhuirfean) is a Georgian garden square on the southside of Dublin city centre.

== History ==
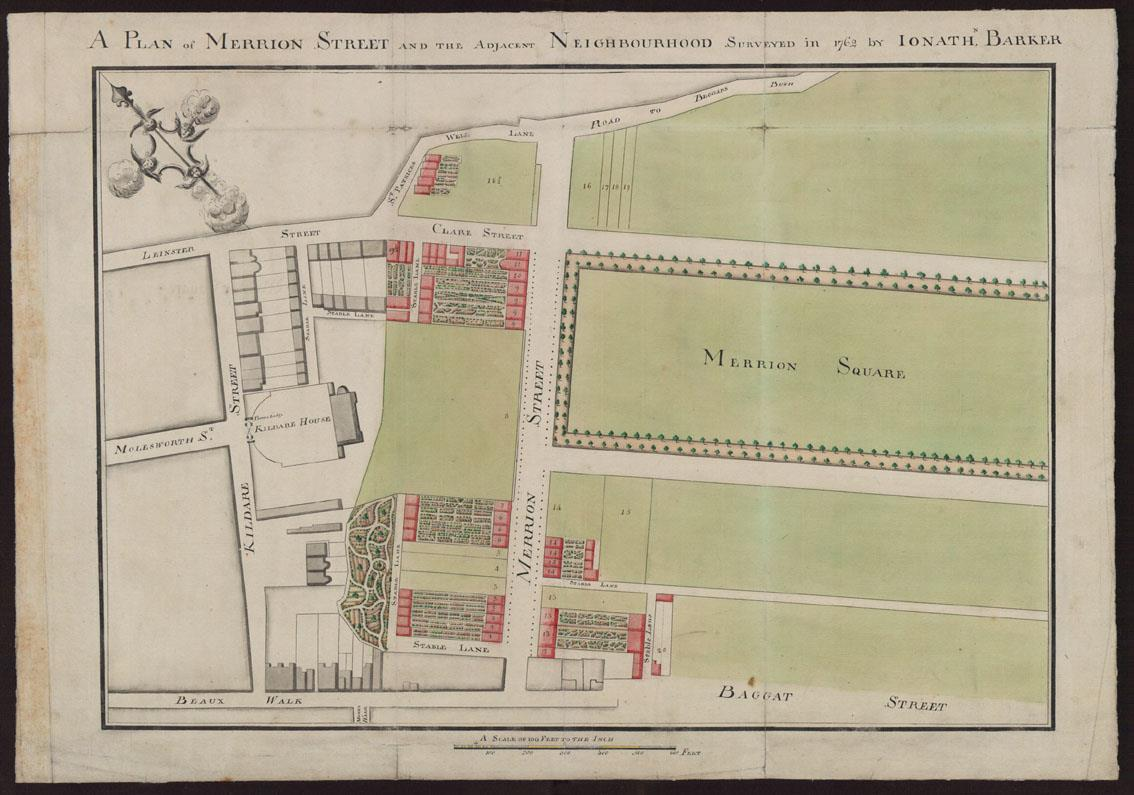
Merrion Square map (1762)

The square was laid out in 1762 to a plan by John Smyth and Jonathan Barker for the estate of Viscount FitzWilliam. Samuel Sproule later laid out the East side around 1780 and the gardens were created through a competition won by Benjamin Simpson in 1792 thanks to drawings created by John James Barralet. All of the surrounding houses were largely complete by the beginning of the 19th century.

Before the River Liffey was fully contained, floods on a high tide could reach as far as the square. In 1792, during one such event, the Duke of Leinster Augustus FitzGerald managed to sail a boat from Ringsend through a breach in the river wall as far as the north-east corner of Merrion Square (where it meets Holles Street).

During the Great Irish Famine of the 1840s, soup kitchens were set up in Merrion Square Park to help feed the citizens.

The demand for such Georgian townhouse residences south of the River Liffey had been fuelled by the decision of the then Earl of Kildare (later the Duke of Leinster) to build his Dublin home on the then undeveloped southside. He constructed the largest aristocratic residence in Dublin, Leinster House, second only to Dublin Castle.

Aristocrats, bishops and the wealthy sold their northside townhouses and migrated to the new southside developments.

== Legacy ==
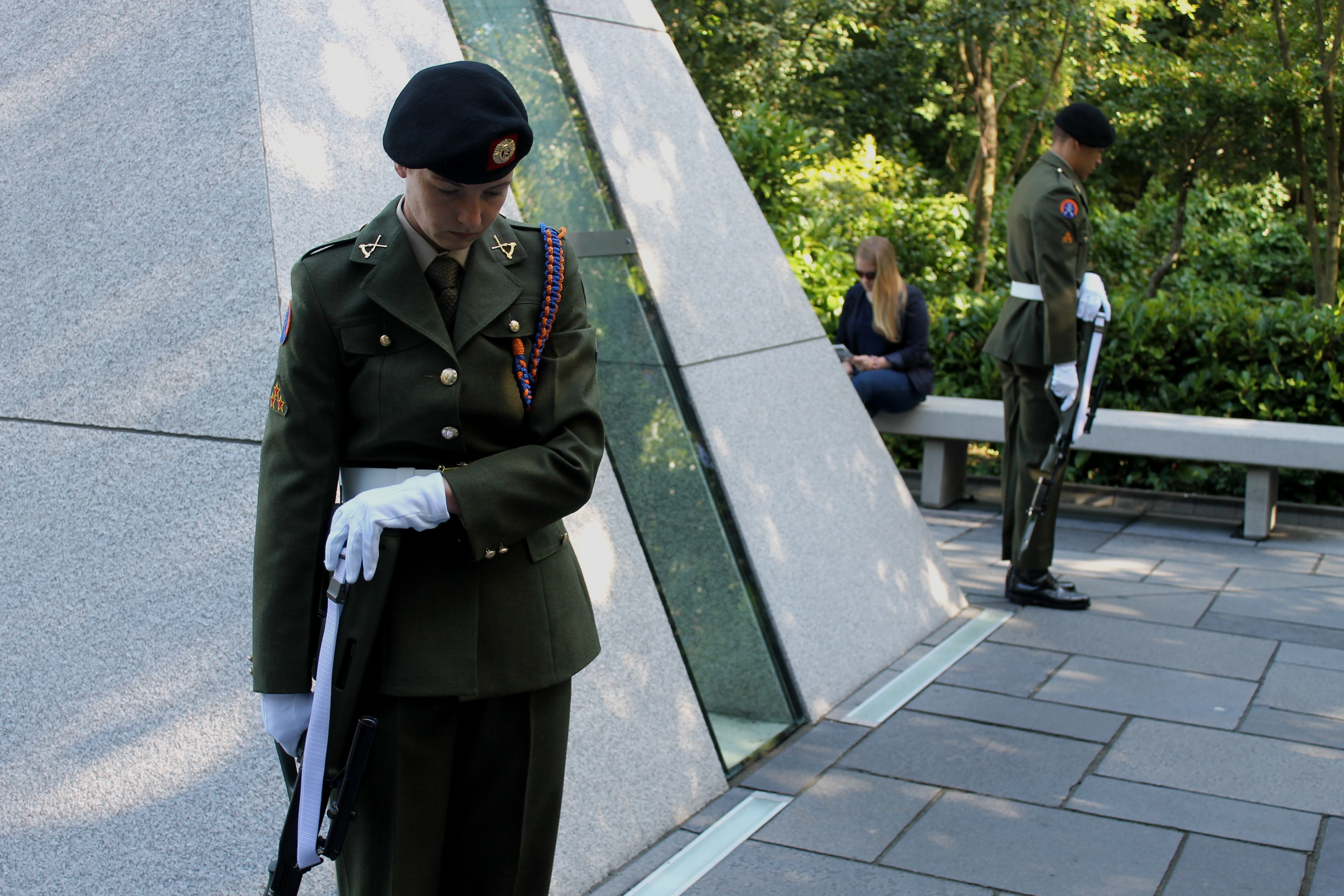
Soldiers guard the site of the National Memorial to members of the Defence Forces who died in the Service of the State

All the original 18th-century properties in Merrion Square have survived to the present day except for Antrim House which was demolished to make way for the National Maternity Hospital in the 1930s. Three sides are lined with Georgian redbrick townhouses; the West side abuts the grounds of Leinster House (seat of the Oireachtas), Government Buildings, the Natural History Museum and the National Gallery. The central railed-off garden is now a public park.

The Wellington Testimonial to commemorate the victories of Arthur Wellesley, 1st Duke of Wellington, was originally planned to be located in Merrion Square. However, it was built in the Phoenix Park after opposition from the square's residents.

== Occupancy ==
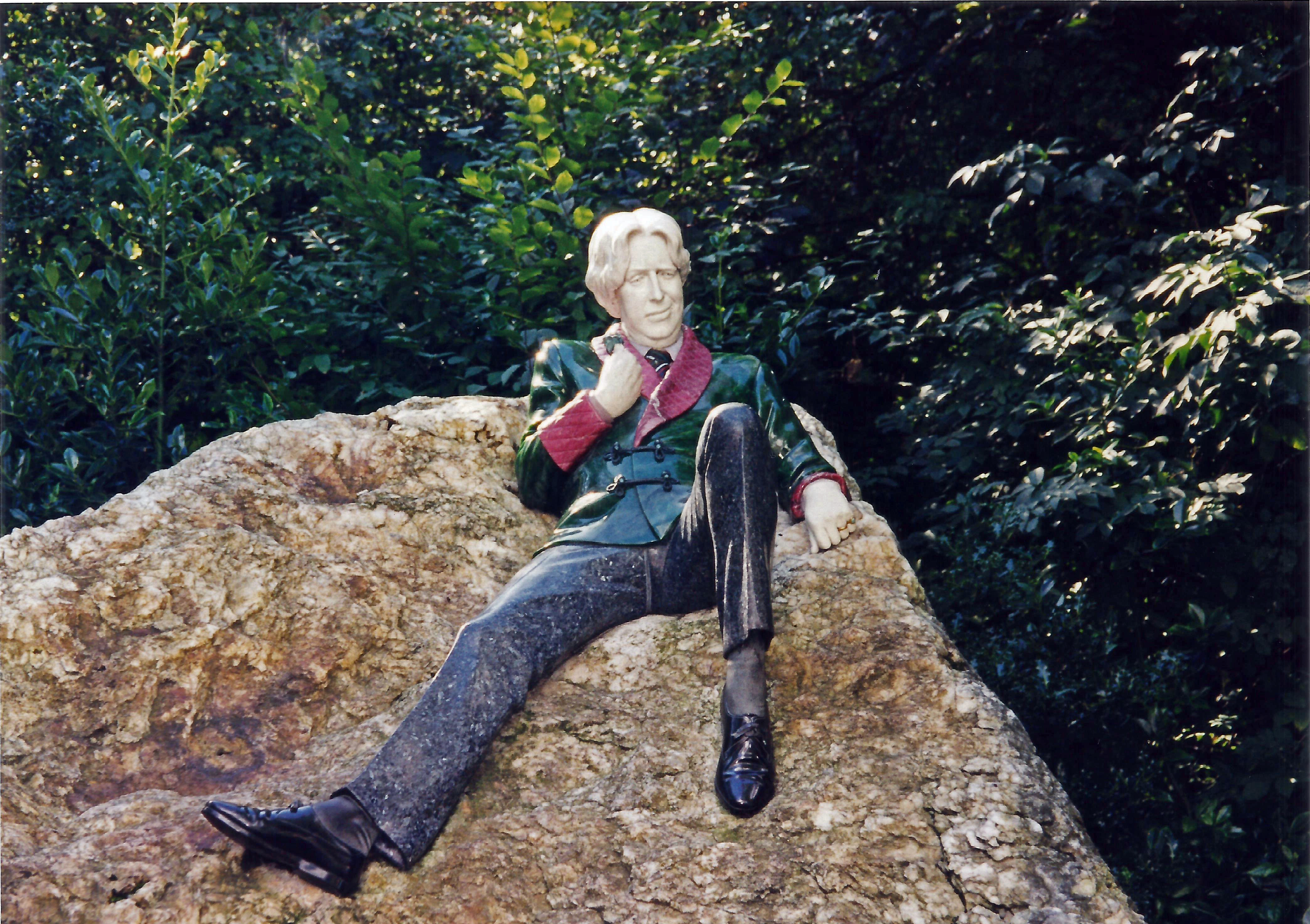
Oscar Wilde Statue

Until about the 1950s, the houses in the square were largely residential, but today most of them are used for office accommodation. The Irish Red Cross, the Royal Institute of the Architects of Ireland and the Irish Georgian Society have their headquarters on the square. The National Maternity Hospital is on the North terrace.

The poet, novelist, and satirist Oscar Wilde lived at No. 1, poet W. B. Yeats lived at No. 82, and Daniel O'Connell at No. 58, the latter of which is now known as the O'Connell House, home to the Keough Naughton Centre of the University of Notre Dame, an American college. The fashion and interior designer Sybil Connolly lived at No. 71. A number of houses in the square have plaques with historical information on former notable residents, including A.E. (George William Russell) and Sheridan Le Fanu. Despite the square being largely occupied by commercial entities, there are still several residents, including fashion designer Louise Kennedy and tycoon Dermot Desmond.

Until 1972 the British Embassy was based at No 39. However, following the Bloody Sunday shootings in Northern Ireland, a crowd of over 20,000 people converged on the site in protest and the building was burnt to the ground. Currently, the embassies of France, South Korea and Slovakia are based on the south side of the square and the Church of Scientology's National Affairs Office has been housed at No 4 on the north side since October 2016.

== Park ==
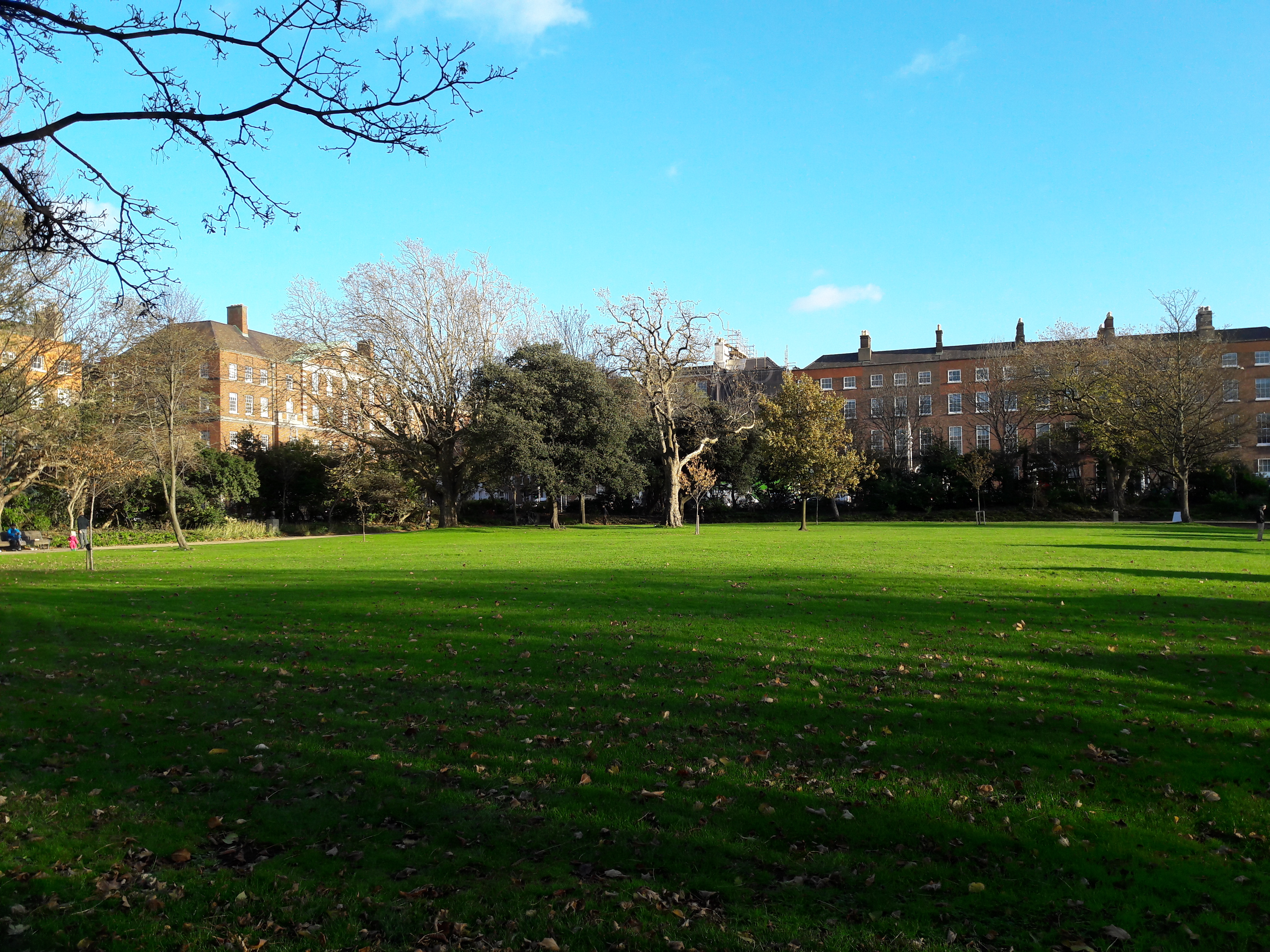
Merrion Square Park

The earliest plan of the park shows a double line of trees around the perimeter which was later enclosed by railings in the early years of the 19th century. A Jardin Anglaise approach was adopted for the layout of the park with contoured grass areas, informal tree clumps, sunken curved paths and perimeter planting. The Rutland Fountain was one of the first structures to be built inside of the park on the west side of the square in 1792.

Up until 1974, the park was only open to residents in possession of a private key. Now managed by Dublin City Council, the park contains a statue of Oscar Wilde, who resided in No. 1, Merrion Square from 1855 to 1876, many other sculptures and a collection of old Dublin lamp standards. Irish-American sculptor Jerome Connor, best known for his work "Nuns of the Battlefield" in Washington D.C., designed the public art piece, "Eire". The park also contains a sculpture of a Joker's Chair in memory of Father Ted star Dermot Morgan.

The park in the square was called "Archbishop Ryan Park", after Dermot Ryan, the Catholic archbishop who transferred ownership to the city. In 2009, Dermot Ryan was criticised in the Murphy Report; in January 2010, Dublin City Council sought public views on renaming the park. In September 2010, the City Council voted to rename the park as Merrion Square Park.

The park was also used by the St John Ambulance Brigade for annual events such as reviews and first aid competitions. The organisation was founded in 1903 by Sir John Lumsden KBE MD. During this time Dr Lumsden was living nearby at 4 Fitzwilliam Place. He was the chief medical officer at the Guinness Brewery and practised at Mercer's Hospital.

During the First World War, both St. John Ambulance and the British Red Cross Society worked together in a joint effort as part of the war effort. This ensured services did not overlap with each other. Both organisations were a familiar sight among Irish people, particularly at Merrion Square where St. John Ambulance operated for almost 50 years. The headquarters of St. John Ambulance was situated at 40 Merrion Square during WWI later moving to 14 Merrion Square. Today they are located at Lumsden House, 29 Upper Leeson Street, Dublin 4 (see St John Ambulance archive for further info).

== Notable residents ==
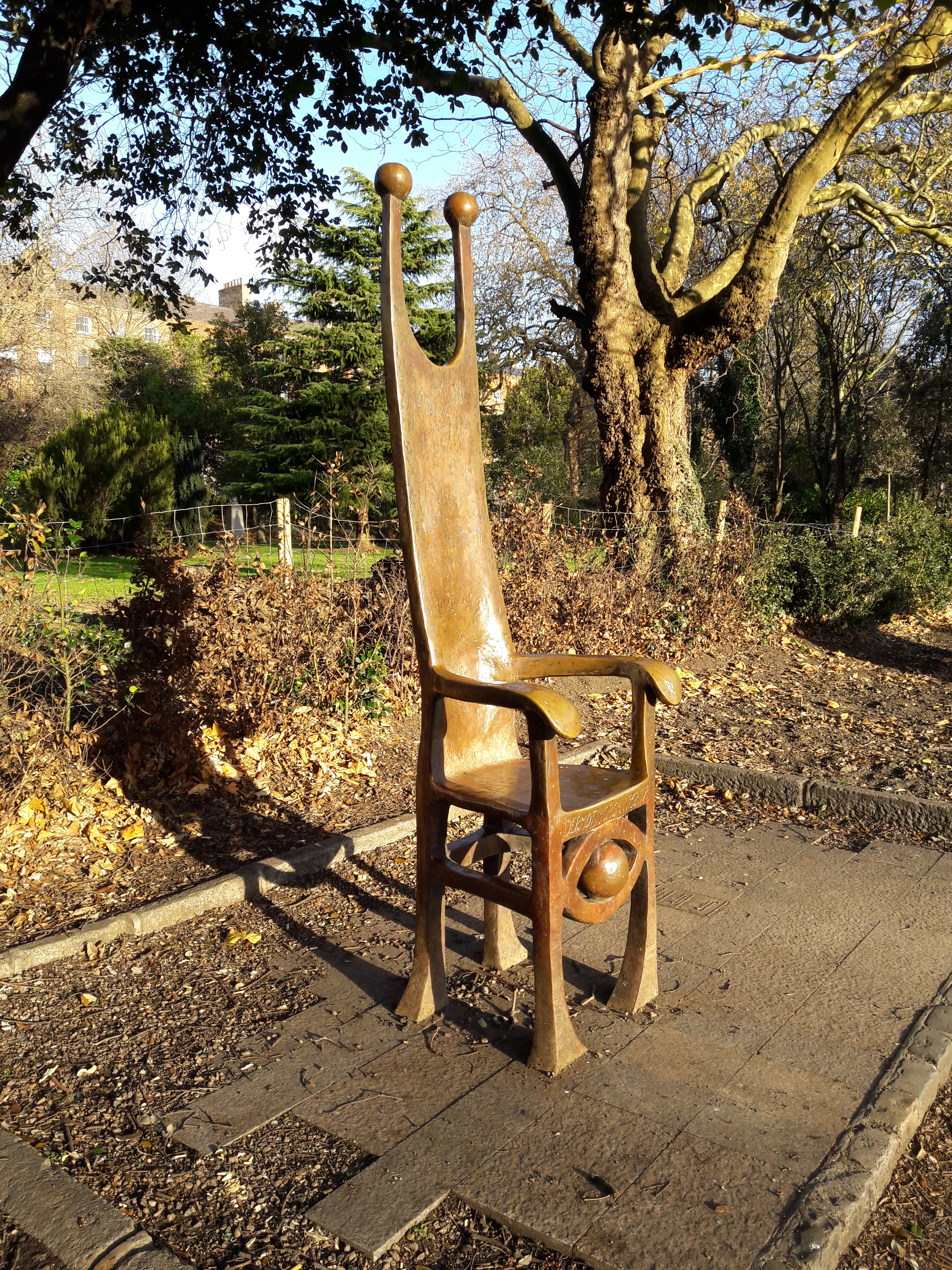
The Joker's Chair, built in memory of comedian Dermot Morgan

Merrion Square was a fashionable address for politicians, lawyers, doctors and writers. Notable residents have included;

- The Rev'd Gilbert Austin (1753–1837) – Educator, clergyman and author
- Jonah Barrington (1756/57–1834) – Irish lawyer, judge and politician
- The Very Reverend Henry Montague Browne (1799–1884) – dean of Lismore (Church of Ireland)
- Sybil Connolly (1921–1998) – fashion & interior designer
- Sir Dominic Corrigan (1802–1880) – physician
- Sir Philip Crampton (1777–1858) – surgeon
- Dermot Desmond (born 1950) – Irish financier
- Richard FitzWilliam, 7th Viscount FitzWilliam (1745–1816) – Irish peer and musical antiquarian
- William Fletcher (1750–1823) – judge and politician
- John Leslie Foster (1781–1842) – barrister, judge and MP
- Edward Gibson, 1st Baron Ashbourne (1837–1913) – lawyer and Lord Chancellor of Ireland
- Violet Gibson (1876–1956) – daughter of Edward Gibson, 1st Baron Ashbourne; attempted assassin of Benito Mussolini
- Henry Grattan (1746–1820) – politician and MP
- Robert James Graves (1796–1853) – surgeon
- Michael Ralph Thomas Gunn (1840-1901) - co-founder of the Dublin Gaiety Theatre
- Charles Hemphill, 1st Baron Hemphill (1822–1908) – politician and barrister
- Louise Kennedy (born 1960) – Irish fashion designer
- George Knox (1765–1827) – politician and MP
- Valentine Lawless, 2nd Baron Cloncurry (1773–1853) – politician and landowner
- Sheridan Le Fanu (1814–1873) – writer
- Robert Dyer Lyons (1826–1886) – physician and MP
- Sir Henry Marsh (1790–1860) – surgeon
- Richard Bolton McCausland (1810–1900) – surgeon
- John Henry North (1788–1831) – barrister, judge and MP
- Daniel O'Connell (1775–1847) – politician and MP
- Andrew O'Connor (1874–1941) – sculptor
- Edward Pennefather (1774–1847) – judge
- Richard Pennefather (1773–1859) – judge
- David Richard Pigot (1796–1873) – judge
- Sir Andrew Porter (1837–1919) – judge
- George William Russell (1867–1935) – poet and painter
- Erwin Schrödinger (1887–1961) – Austrian-Irish theoretical physicist
- John Stratford, 1st Earl of Aldborough (1698–1777) – Irish peer and MP
- Whitley Stokes (1830–1909) – lawyer and Celtic scholar
- William Stokes Snr (1804–1878) – physician
- William Stokes Jnr (1838–1900) – surgeon
- John Lighton Synge (1897–1995) – physicist
- Oscar Wilde (1854–1900) – writer and poet
- Sir William Wilde (1815–1876) – writer and surgeon
- W. B. Yeats (1865–1939) – poet, playwright and senator

== See also ==
- Sir William Napier, 3rd Baronet
- List of streets and squares in Dublin
