= Roberto McCausland Dieppa =

Colombian pianist, conductor (born 1959)

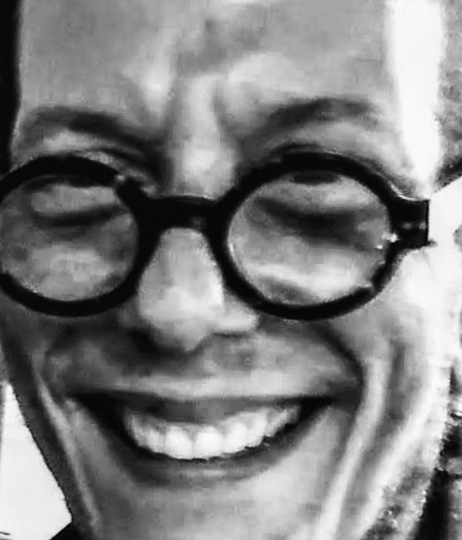
- Born: July 6, 1959 (age 67); Barranquilla, Colombia
- Education: Berry College
- Occupations: Pianist, composer, conductor, author
- Years active: 1997–present
- Notable work: Sinfonia Latina
- Style: Classical, contemporary, Nouveau Caribe
- Relatives: Paulina Vega Dieppa (cousin) Ernesto McCausland (cousin)
- Awards: Pro arte Hungarica prize 2006
- Musical career
- Labels: eOne Music International Classics, Scruffy, Roberto McCausland-Dieppa
- Website: robertomccauslanddieppa.com

Roberto McCausland-Dieppa (born July 6, 1959), also known as Dieppe, is a Colombian pianist, composer, and conductor, specializing in classical, jazz, and Hungarian music. His performances at various venues across the United States, Asia, Australia, and Europe, are noted such as Carnegie Hall, Ostrogskich-Chopin Hall, and the United Nations.

Roberto became well known after composing and conducting Sinfonia Latina at age seventeen in 1976. Following Sinfonia Latina event, he moved on to classical performances, composing and conducting becoming a critical figure in music education for children, disseminating Caribbean music using folk idioms and dance rhythm, espousing Hungarian music and culture, particularly the music of Franz Liszt, Béla Bartók which he is most passionately interested.

== Biography ==
Dieppa was born in Barranquilla, Colombia. He gained prominence at the age of 17 when he composed and led the "Sinfonía Latina" with the Barranquilla Philharmonic. He was educated at Barry College.

In 1976, Dieppa blended rock, jazz, salsa, Spanish, and Caribbean music into a symphony, performed at the Municipal Theater to an audience of around 3,000. The performance is noted as a defining moment in his career.

In 2006, Dieppa was invited by the United Nations to perform at the commemorative event marking the 50th anniversary of the 1956 Hungarian revolution.

== Conducting style ==
A noted feature of the conductor's style is his ability to conduct without a baton. This eccentricity was observed by Juan B. Fernandez author and editor of El Heraldo comparing him to a young Arturo Toscanini. It is generally considered of great importance to a conductor's ability to communicate with the orchestra.

As Igor Stravinsky "Dieppa's" conducting style came about as a necessity to disseminate the music and expand the Orchestra beyond traditional boundaries.

== Bibliography ==
Author of over 30 articles about classical music and Caribbean culture, published in journals and periodicals. "Dieppa" is the creator of Beethoven for kids and teens, and Beethoven for kids. A series of books in various formats presented in both narrative audio and CDs for children and young people.

== Selected discography ==
Caribe al Mundo was released on the Scruffy records label in 2013. The disc features Tres Piezas Encantadas para Orquesta composed in "Nouveau" Caribe genre 1. Inspiracion- De un Tema sobre el Rio Magdalena, 2. Fuga Rítmica Flamenca Caribe sobre la Pollera Colora 3. Cancion del Amor MisteriosoDanza- Requiem a Joe Arroyo.

There are three recordings of his performing Liszt's Sonata in B minor: Liszt and more... recorded in September 15, 1997, Music from the Documentary recorded in 2013, and Summer Le Chaluer Estivale, Liszt recorded in 2014.

Other well-known recordings are Autumn: Passion- Beethoven Three Great Sonatas 2014, Beethoven for kids and teens released in 2003, Beethoven for kids released on 23 May 2006, and Late Night: Encores II 2014

The public associates Dieppa with the works of Beethoven, Liszt, and Bartok.

== Legacy ==
=== Sinfonia Latina Festival and orchestral residency ===
The Inter-American Development Bank sponsors the music education area program for Sinfonia Latina music Festival Orchestral Residency in Barranquilla, Colombia. The IDB and IDB Invest assembly of governors 2021, gifts children, and young people of Barranquilla, and its metropolitan area the application, operation, and practice of the festival an orchestral residency program. The Festival's mission is excellence in performance, education, and social work through the arts for community development. Scheduled annually, the event takes place two weeks after the cities carnival. Puerto Colombia Foundation, of Barranquilla, Colombia, is the executing entity using the arts for education and social development. Initially planned for March 2020, the event was postponed to March 2022 – 2023 due to the COVID-19 pandemic. Beethoven's Fifth Symphony and autochthonous-based work composed by Mr. Dieppa are part of the program. The Festival and Residency include the donation of musical instruments, lectures in universities, conservatories, and schools; accompanied by a series of workshops on music instruction and training for teachers attached to the youth orchestra system.

The resident ensemble is the Orchestra of Saint Luke's, New York City, conducted by Roberto McCausland "Dieppa".

== Awards and recognition ==
- 2002: Merrill Lynch Prize
- 2006: Pro-Arte Hungarica Prize by the Hungarian Government's Ministry of Culture
